= List of populated places in Zonguldak Province =

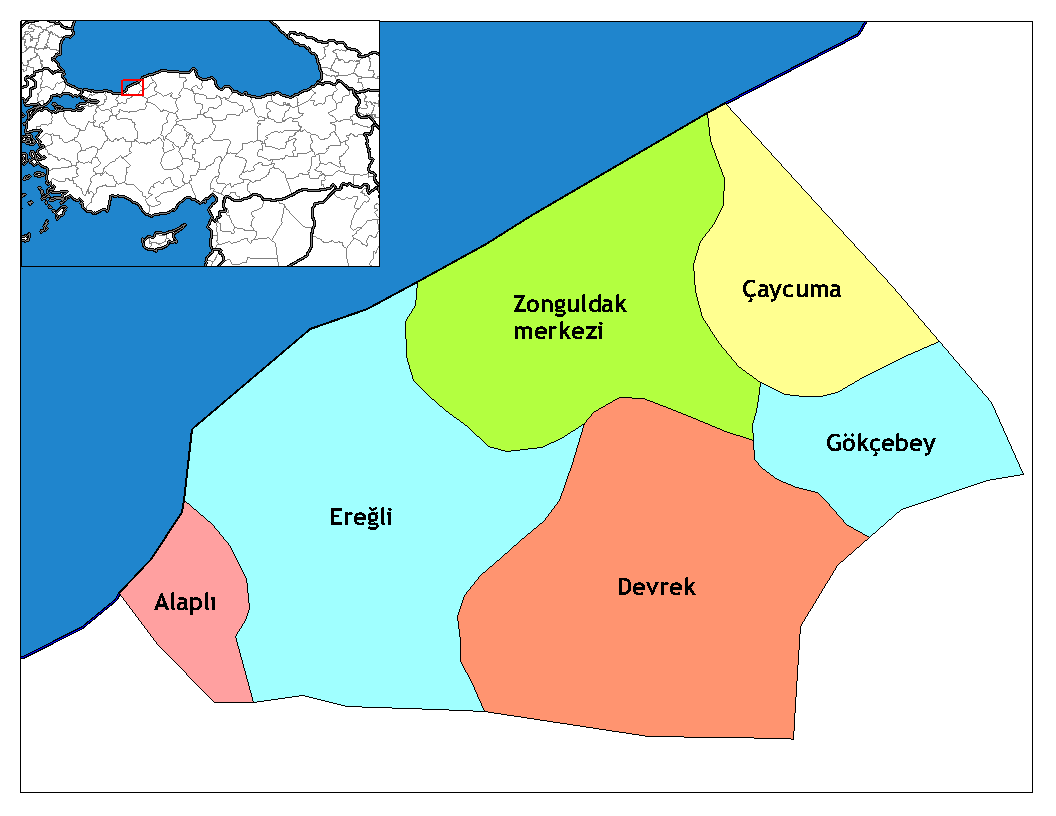
Zonguldak Province

Below is the list of populated places in Zonguldak Province, Turkey by the districts. In the following lists first place in each list is the administrative center of the district.

== Zonguldak ==
- Zonguldak
- Akşeyh, Zonguldak
- Alancık, Zonguldak
- Aşağıçayır, Zonguldak
- Ayvatlar, Zonguldak
- Balçıklı, Zonguldak
- Beycuma, Zonguldak
- Bozca, Zonguldak
- Çağlı, Zonguldak
- Çatalağzı, Zonguldak
- Çırgan, Zonguldak
- Çukurören, Zonguldak
- Dağköy, Zonguldak
- Dereköy, Zonguldak
- Ebegümeci, Zonguldak
- Eceler, Zonguldak
- Elvanpazarcık, Zonguldak
- Enseköy, Zonguldak
- Esenköy, Zonguldak
- Futa, Zonguldak
- Gelik, Zonguldak
- Göbü, Zonguldak
- Gücek, Zonguldak
- Hacıali, Zonguldak
- Himmetoğlu, Zonguldak
- Kabalaklı, Zonguldak
- Kaleoğlu, Zonguldak
- Karadere, Zonguldak
- Karaman, Zonguldak
- Karapınar, Zonguldak
- Kardeşler, Zonguldak
- Kargalar, Zonguldak
- Keller, Zonguldak
- Kızılcakese, Zonguldak
- Kilimli, Zonguldak
- Korucak, Zonguldak
- Kozlu, Zonguldak
- Kozluköy, Zonguldak
- Köroğlu, Zonguldak
- Köserecik, Zonguldak
- Kumtarla, Zonguldak
- Kurtköy, Zonguldak
- Muslu, Zonguldak
- Olukyanı, Zonguldak
- Osmanlı, Zonguldak
- Örencik, Zonguldak
- Sakaköy, Zonguldak
- Sapça, Zonguldak
- Saraycık, Zonguldak
- Sarımsak, Zonguldak
- Seyfetler, Zonguldak
- Sivriler, Zonguldak
- Sofular, Zonguldak
- Şirinköy, Zonguldak
- Tasmacı, Zonguldak
- Taşçılar, Zonguldak
- Türkali, Zonguldak
- Uzungüney, Zonguldak
- Üçköy, Zonguldak
- Yahma, Zonguldak

== Alaplı ==
- Alaplı
- Ahatlı, Alaplı
- Ahiler, Alaplı
- Alaplıbölücek, Alaplı
- Alaplıkocaali, Alaplı
- Alaplıortacı, Alaplı
- Alaplıömerli, Alaplı
- Alioğlu, Alaplı
- Aşağıdağ, Alaplı
- Aşağıdoğancılar, Alaplı
- Aşağıtekke, Alaplı
- Aydınyayla, Alaplı
- Bektaşlı, Alaplı
- Belen, Alaplı
- Büyüktekke, Alaplı
- Canbazlı, Alaplı
- Çamlıbel, Alaplı
- Çatak, Alaplı
- Çayköy, Alaplı
- Çengelli, Alaplı
- Çiçekli, Alaplı
- Demirciler, Alaplı
- Doğancılar, Alaplı
- Durhanlı, Alaplı
- Fındıklı, Alaplı
- Gökhasan, Alaplı
- Gümeli, Alaplı
- Gürpınar, Alaplı
- Hacıhasan, Alaplı
- Hallı, Alaplı
- Hasanlı, Alaplı
- Hüseyinli, Alaplı
- İsafakılı, Alaplı
- Kabalar, Alaplı
- Kasımlı, Alaplı
- Kılçak, Alaplı
- Kıran, Alaplı
- Kocaman, Alaplı
- Küçükkaymaz, Alaplı
- Küçüktekke, Alaplı
- Kürkükler, Alaplı
- Musabeyli, Alaplı
- Okçular, Alaplı
- Onurlu, Alaplı
- Osmanlı, Alaplı
- Sabırlı, Alaplı
- Sofullu, Alaplı
- Yedigelli, Alaplı
- Yenidoğanlar, Alaplı
- Yeniköy, Alaplı
- Yeşilyurt, Alaplı

== Çaycuma ==
- Çaycuma
- Ahatlı, Çaycuma
- Adaköy, Çaycuma
- Akçahatipler, Çaycuma
- Akpınar, Çaycuma
- Akyamaç, Çaycuma
- Aliköy, Çaycuma
- Aşağıihsaniye, Çaycuma
- Aşağısarmaşık, Çaycuma
- Ayvazlar, Çaycuma
- Basat, Çaycuma
- Başaran, Çaycuma
- Burunkaya, Çaycuma
- Coburlar, Çaycuma
- Çamlık, Çaycuma
- Çayır, Çaycuma
- Çayköy, Çaycuma
- Çomranlı, Çaycuma
- Çorak, Çaycuma
- Çömlekçi, Çaycuma
- Dağüstü, Çaycuma
- Derecikören, Çaycuma
- Dereköseler, Çaycuma
- Dereli, Çaycuma
- Dursunlar, Çaycuma
- Emirşah, Çaycuma
- Erenköy, Çaycuma
- Esenlik, Çaycuma
- Esentepe, Çaycuma
- Esenyurt, Çaycuma
- Filyos, Çaycuma
- Geriş, Çaycuma
- Gökçehatipler, Çaycuma
- Gökçeler, Çaycuma
- Gökçetabaklar, Çaycuma
- Güdüllü, Çaycuma
- Güzeloğlu, Çaycuma
- Güzelyaka, Çaycuma
- Güzelyurt, Çaycuma
- Hacıibadi, Çaycuma
- Hacılar, Çaycuma
- Hacıosmanlar, Çaycuma
- Helvacılar, Çaycuma
- İhsanoğlu, Çaycuma
- Kadıoğlu, Çaycuma
- Kahvecioğlu, Çaycuma
- Kalafatlı, Çaycuma
- Kalaycıoğlu, Çaycuma
- Karaahmetler, Çaycuma
- Karakoç, Çaycuma
- Karamusa, Çaycuma
- Karapınar, Çaycuma
- Kayabaşı, Çaycuma
- Kayıkçılar, Çaycuma
- Kerimler, Çaycuma
- Kışla, Çaycuma
- Kızılbel, Çaycuma
- Koramanlar, Çaycuma
- Madenler, Çaycuma
- Muharremşah, Çaycuma
- Muhsinler, Çaycuma
- Musausta, Çaycuma
- Nebioğlu, Çaycuma
- Perşembe, Çaycuma
- Ramazanoğlu, Çaycuma
- Saltukova, Çaycuma
- Sandallar, Çaycuma
- Sarmaşık, Çaycuma
- Sazköy, Çaycuma
- Sipahiler, Çaycuma
- Şehler, Çaycuma
- Şenköy, Çaycuma
- Şeyhoğlu, Çaycuma
- Taşçılı, Çaycuma
- Temenler, Çaycuma
- Torlaklar, Çaycuma
- Uluköy, Çaycuma
- Veliköy, Çaycuma
- Yakademirciler, Çaycuma
- Yazıbaşı, Çaycuma
- Yazıköy, Çaycuma
- Yeniköy, Çaycuma
- Yeşilköy, Çaycuma
- Yeşilyayla, Çaycuma
- Yeşilyurt, Çaycuma
- Yolgeçen, Çaycuma
- Yukarıdere, Çaycuma
- Yukarıgöynük, Çaycuma
- Yukarıihsaniye, Çaycuma

== Devrek ==
- Devrek
- Adatepe, Devrek
- Ahmetoğlu, Devrek
- Akçabey, Devrek
- Akçasu, Devrek
- Aksu, Devrek
- Alparslan, Devrek
- Ataköy, Devrek
- Bakırcılar, Devrek
- Başlarkadı, Devrek
- Bılık, Devrek
- Bölücek, Devrek
- Burhanoğlu, Devrek
- Bükköy, Devrek
- Çağlar, Devrek
- Çaydeğirmeni, Devrek
- Çolakpehlivan, Devrek
- Çomaklar, Devrek
- Çorak, Devrek
- Dedeoğlu, Devrek
- Derebulaca, Devrek
- Durupınar, Devrek
- Eğerci, Devrek
- Erenler, Devrek
- Ermekoğlu, Devrek
- Eveyikli, Devrek
- Gümüşpınar, Devrek
- Gürbüzler, Devrek
- Gürçeşme, Devrek
- Güzelyurt, Devrek
- Halilbeyoğlu, Devrek
- Hatipler, Devrek
- Hışıroğlu, Devrek
- Hüseyinçavuşoğlu, Devrek
- İsabeyli, Devrek
- İslamköy, Devrek
- Kabaca, Devrek
- Karabaşlı, Devrek
- Karacaören, Devrek
- Karakoçlu, Devrek
- Komşular, Devrek
- Kozlugüney, Devrek
- Kozlukadı, Devrek
- Kurudere, Devrek
- Kuzca, Devrek
- Mahmutoğlu, Devrek
- Mekekler, Devrek
- Mumcuoğlu, Devrek
- Müfettişler, Devrek
- Müstakimler, Devrek
- Nizamlar, Devrek
- Oğuzhan, Devrek
- Osmanbeyler, Devrek
- Özbağı, Devrek
- Özpınar, Devrek
- Özyurt, Devrek
- Pelitli, Devrek
- Pınarönü, Devrek
- Purtuloğlu, Devrek
- Sabunlar, Devrek
- Sarnaz, Devrek
- Serdaroğlu, Devrek
- Seyisoğlu, Devrek
- Sipahiler, Devrek
- Sofular, Devrek
- Tabaklar, Devrek
- Taşkesen, Devrek
- Tellioğlu, Devrek
- Tosunlar, Devrek
- Türkmenoğlu, Devrek
- Velibeyler, Devrek
- Yağmurca, Devrek
- Yassıören, Devrek
- Yazıcık, Devrek
- Yazıcıoğlu, Devrek
- Yeniköy, Devrek
- Yeşilada, Devrek
- Yeşilköy, Devrek
- Yeşilöz, Devrek
- Yeşilyurt, Devrek
- Yılanlıca, Devrek
- Yılanlıcakuz, Devrek

== Ereğli ==
- Ereğli
- Abdi, Ereğli
- Akkaya, Ereğli
- Akköy, Ereğli
- Alacabük, Ereğli
- Alaplısofular, Ereğli
- Artıklar, Ereğli
- Aşağıhocalar, Ereğli
- Aşağıkayalıdere, Ereğli
- Aydın, Ereğli
- Aydınlar, Ereğli
- Ballıca, Ereğli
- Başören, Ereğli
- Başörendoğancılar, Ereğli
- Bayat, Ereğli
- Bölücek, Ereğli
- Cemaller, Ereğli
- Çamlıbel, Ereğli
- Çayırlı, Ereğli
- Çaylıoğlu, Ereğli
- Çevlik, Ereğli
- Çiğdemli, Ereğli
- Çömlekçi, Ereğli
- Dağlar, Ereğli
- Dağlıca, Ereğli
- Danişmentli, Ereğli
- Davutlar, Ereğli
- Dedeler, Ereğli
- Düzpelit, Ereğli
- Elmacı, Ereğli
- Emirali, Ereğli
- Esenköy, Ereğli
- Esenler, Ereğli
- Fındıklı, Ereğli
- Gebe, Ereğli
- Gökçeler, Ereğli
- Göktepe, Ereğli
- Güllük, Ereğli
- Gülüç, Ereğli
- Güzelyurt, Ereğli
- Hacıuslu, Ereğli
- Halaşlı, Ereğli
- Hamzafakılı, Ereğli
- Hasankahyalar, Ereğli
- Hasbeyler, Ereğli
- Işıklı, Ereğli
- İmranlar, Ereğli
- İskenderli, Ereğli
- Kandilli, Ereğli
- Karakavuz, Ereğli
- Kaymaklar, Ereğli
- Keşkek, Ereğli
- Ketenciler, Ereğli
- Kıyıcak, Ereğli
- Kızılca, Ereğli
- Kızılcapınar, Ereğli
- Kirencik, Ereğli
- Kocaali, Ereğli
- Kurtlar, Ereğli
- Külah, Ereğli
- Ormanlı, Ereğli (town)
- Ormanlı, Ereğli (village)
- Ortacı, Ereğli
- Ortaköy, Ereğli
- Osmanlar, Ereğli
- Ova, Ereğli
- Öğberler, Ereğli
- Ören, Ereğli
- Pembeciler, Ereğli
- Pınarcık, Ereğli
- Ramazanlı, Ereğli
- Rüşanlar, Ereğli
- Sakallar, Ereğli
- Saltuklu, Ereğli
- Sarıkaya, Ereğli
- Serintepe, Ereğli
- Sofular, Ereğli
- Soğanlıyörük, Ereğli
- Sücüllü, Ereğli
- Süleymanbeyler, Ereğli
- Sütlüce, Ereğli
- Şamlar, Ereğli
- Tepeören, Ereğli
- Terzi, Ereğli
- Topallı, Ereğli
- Topçalı, Ereğli
- Toyfanlı, Ereğli
- Uludağ, Ereğli
- Üçköy, Ereğli
- Üveyikli, Ereğli
- Vakıf, Ereğli
- Velidağ, Ereğli
- Yalnızçam, Ereğli
- Yaraşlıyörük, Ereğli
- Yazıcılar, Ereğli
- Yazıören, Ereğli
- Yenidoğancılar, Ereğli
- Yeniköy, Ereğli
- Yeşilköy, Ereğli
- Yukarıhocalar, Ereğli
- Yunuslu, Ereğli
- Zındancılar, Ereğli

== Gökçebey ==
- Gökçebey
- Aktarla, Gökçebey
- Aliusta, Gökçebey
- Aydınlar, Gökçebey
- Bakacakkadı, Gökçebey
- Bakiler, Gökçebey
- Bodaç, Gökçebey
- Çukur, Gökçebey
- Dağdemirciler, Gökçebey
- Yeşilköy, Gökçebey
- Duhancılar, Gökçebey
- Gaziler, Gökçebey
- Hacımusa, Gökçebey
- Karapınar, Gökçebey
- Muharremler, Gökçebey
- Namazgah, Gökçebey
- Örmeci, Gökçebey
- Pazarlıoğlu, Gökçebey
- Saraçlar, Gökçebey
- Uzunahmetler, Gökçebey
- Veyisoğlu, Gökçebey
