= List of municipalities in Zonguldak Province =

This is the list of municipalities in Zonguldak Province, Turkey, as of March 2023.

| District | Municipality |
|---|---|
| Alaplı | Alaplı |
| Alaplı | Gümeli |
| Çaycuma | Çaycuma |
| Çaycuma | Filyos |
| Çaycuma | Karapınar |
| Çaycuma | Nebioğlu |
| Çaycuma | Perşembe |
| Çaycuma | Saltukova |
| Devrek | Çaydeğirmeni |
| Devrek | Devrek |
| Ereğli | Gülüç |
| Ereğli | Kandilli |
| Ereğli | Karadeniz Ereğli |
| Ereğli | Ormanlı |
| Gökçebey | Bakacakkadı |
| Gökçebey | Gökçebey |
| Kilimli | Çatalağzı |
| Kilimli | Gelik |
| Kilimli | Kilimli |
| Kilimli | Muslu |
| Kozlu | Kozlu |
| Zonguldak | Beycuma |
| Zonguldak | Elvanpazarcık |
| Zonguldak | Karaman |
| Zonguldak | Zonguldak |
