= Durupınar =

Durupınar is the name of several places in Turkey:

- Durupınar site, in the Tendürek mountains, Ağrı Province, named for Turkish Army Captain İlhan Durupınar, the site is notable for its role in Searches for Noah's Ark
- Durupınar, Haymana, Haymana, Ankara
- Durupınar, İnebolu, Kastamonu Province
- Durupınar, Devrek, Devrek
- Durupınar, Elazığ, Elazığ Province
