= Ahatlı =

Ahatlı may refer to the following places in Turkey:

- Ahatlı, Alaplı, a village in Zonguldak Province
- Ahatlı, Çaycuma, a village in Zonguldak Province
- Ahatlı, Elmalı, a neighbourhood in Antalya Province
- Ahatlı, Kaş, a neighbourhood in Antalya Province
