= Sipahiler =

Sipahiler may refer to the following villages in Turkey:

- Sipahiler, Bartın, Bartın Province
- Sipahiler, Çaycuma, Zonguldak Province
- Sipahiler, Devrek, Zonguldak Province
- Sipahiler, Gerede, Bolu Province
- Sipahiler, Sarıyahşi, Aksaray Province
