= Gucek =

Gucek may refer to:

- Guček, a Slovene surname.
- Gücek, Kozlu, a village in Zonguldak Province, Turkey.
