= Çayköy =

Çayköy may refer to:

- Çayköy, Alaplı, a village in Alaplı District, Zonguldak Province, Turkey
- Çayköy, Aşkale
- Çayköy, Bayat
- Çayköy, Çaycuma, a village in Çaycuma District, Zonguldak Province, Turkey
- Çayköy, Ergani
- Çayköy, Gölyaka
- Çayköy, Göynük, a village in the District of Göynük, Bolu Province, Turkey
- Çayköy, Hamamözü, a village in Amasya Province, Turkey
- Çayköy, İnhisar, a village in Bilecik Province, Turkey
- Çayköy, Kaş, a village in Antalya Province, Turkey
- Çayköy, Mecitözü
- Çayköy, Mengen, a village in the District of Mengen, Bolu Province, Turkey
