= Bilik =

Bilik may refer to:

- A room in a longhouse, Borneo
- Bılık, Devrek
- Bilik (surname)
