= Yassıören =

Yassıören may refer to the following settlements in Turkey:

- Yassıören, Başmakçı, a village in Afyonkarahisar Province
- Yassıören, Devrek, a village in Zonguldak Province
- Yassıören, Dursunbey, a neighbourhood in Balıkesir Province
- Yassıören, Kahramankazan, a neighbourhood in Ankara Province
- Yassıören, Karataş, a neighbourhood in Adana Province
