= Dedeoğlu =

Dedeoğlu can refer to:

- Dedeoğlu, Devrek
- Dedeoğlu, Kemah
