= Karakoçlu =

Karakoçlu can refer to:

- Karakoçlu, Devrek
- Karakoçlu, Kemaliye
