= Zonguldak Airport =

Zonguldak Çaycuma Airport Zonguldak Çaycuma Havalimanı
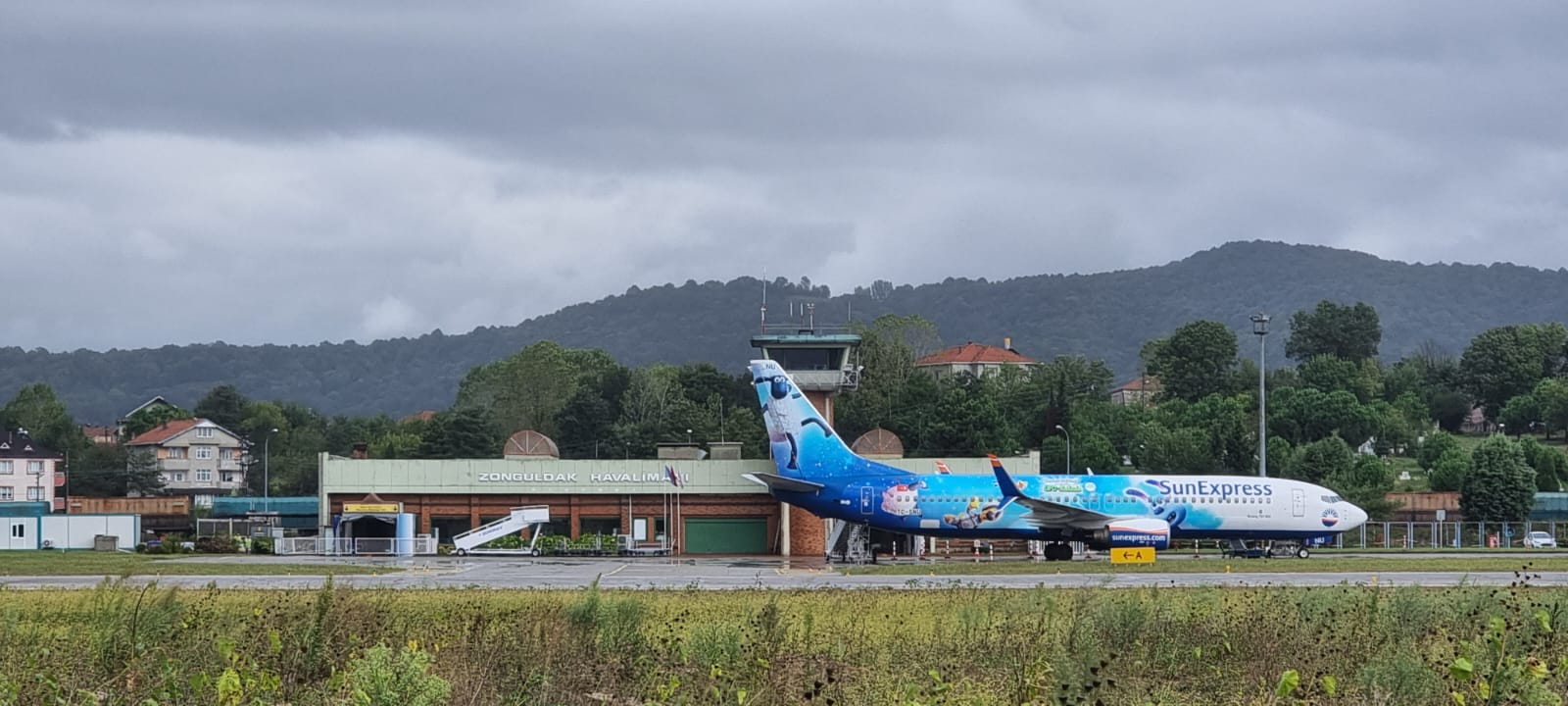
- IATA: ONQ; ICAO: LTAS

Summary
- Airport type: Public
- Operator: General Directorate Of State Airports Authority
- Serves: Zonguldak, Turkey
- Location: Çaycuma, Zonguldak, Turkey
- Opened: 20 August 2007; 18 years ago
- Elevation AMSL: 44 ft (13 m)
- Coordinates: 41°30′23″N 32°05′19″E
- Website: dhmi.gov.tr

Map
- Location within Turkey ONQ (Europe)

Runways
Direction	Length		Surface
Direction	ft	m	Surface
18/36	6,990	2,130	Concrete

Statistics (2025)
- Annual passenger capacity: 500,000
- Passengers: 139,481
- Passenger change 2024–25: ▼1%
- Aircraft movements: 2,048
- Movements change 2024–25: ▲29%

Zonguldak Çaycuma Airport (IATA: ONQ, ICAO: LTAS) is an airport near the city of Zonguldak, in the western Black Sea region of Turkey. It is situated close to the town of Saltukova.

== Airlines and destinations ==
The following airlines operate regular scheduled and charter flights at Zonguldak Airport:

Airlines	Destinations
Corendon Airlines	Düsseldorf
SunExpress	Dortmund, Düsseldorf
Turkish Airlines	Istanbul

== Statistics ==
Zonguldak–Caycuma Airport passenger traffic statistics
Year (months)	Domestic	% change	International	% change	Total	% change
2025	31,102	▲6%	108,379	▼2%	139,481	▼1%
2024	29,376	▲9%	111,006	▲9%	140,382	▲9%
2023	27,028	▲75%	101,442	▲8%	128,470	▲17%
2022	15,482	▲83%	94,288	▲99%	109,770	▲96%
2021	8,450	▲215%	47,440	▲569%	55,890	▲472%
2020	2,683	▼86%	7,093	▼25%	9,776	▼66%
2019	19,500	-	9,408	▼62%	28,908	▲16%
2018	-	-	24,861	▲3%	24,861	▲3%
2017	-	-	24,139	▲5%	24,139	▲5%
2016	-	-	23,086	▼16%	23,086	▼16%
2015	-	-	27,631	▼10%	27,631	▼10%
2014	-	▼100%	30,722	▲36%	30,722	▲19%
2013	3,179	▲456%	22,563	▼17%	25,742	▼7%
2012	572	▲258%	27,139	▲34%	27,711	▲35%
2011	160	▼97%	20,302	▼14%	20,462	▼31%
2010	6,170	-	23,584	▲359%	29,754	▲479%
2009	-	Steady	5,142	Steady	5,142	Steady
