= Sazköy =

Sazköy can refer to:

- Sazköy, Amasya
- Sazköy, Bozkurt
- Sazköy, Çaycuma
- Sazköy, Uğurludağ
