= Yazıcıoğlu =

Yazıcıoğlu (IPA: [ˌjazɯdʒɯˈoːlu], literally "son of the scribe, clerk") is a Turkish surname and may refer to:

- Ahmed Bican Yazıcıoğlu (died ca. 1466), Ottoman author
- Cafer Tufan Yazıcıoğlu (born 1951), Turkish politician
- Cengiz Yazıcıoğlu (born 1953), former Turkish footballer
- Muhsin Yazıcıoğlu (1954–2009), Turkish politician
- Mustafa Sait Yazıcıoğlu (born 1949), former government minister of Turkey
- Mert Yazıcıoğlu (born 1993), actor

== Settlement ==
- Yazıcıoğlu, Devrek, village in Devrek District, Zonguldak Province, Turkey
