= Akçasu =

Akçasu can refer to:

- Akçasu, Devrek
- Akçasu, İskilip
- Akçasu, Söğüt
