= Esenyurt (disambiguation) =

Esenyurt (literally "healthy homeland" or "windy homeland") is a Turkish place name that may refer to:

- Esenyurt, a district of Istanbul Province and part of the metropolitan municipality of the city of Istanbul, Turkey
- Esenyurt, Bartın, a village in the district of Bartın, Bartın Province, Turkey
- Esenyurt, Çaycuma
- Esenyurt, Korkuteli, a village in the district of Korkuteli, Antalya Province, Turkey
- Esenyurt, Pazaryolu
- Esenyurt, Şenkaya
- Esenyurt, Üzümlü
- Esenyurt, Vezirköprü, a village in the district of Vezirköprü, Samsun Province, Turkey
