= Adaköy =

Adaköy can refer to:

- Adaköy, Çaycuma
- Adaköy, Gümüşova
- Adaköy, Kızılcahamam
- Adaköy, Sarayköy
- Adaköy, Yeniçağa
- Adaköy, Eynesil
