= Sarmaşık =

Sarmaşık can refer to:

- Sarmaşık, Bilecik
- Sarmaşık, Çaycuma
- Sarmaşık, Eğil
- Sarmaşık, Ilgaz
- The Turkish name for Ivy (2015 film)
