= Çömlekçi =

Çömlekçi can refer to the following villages in Turkey:

- Çömlekçi, Biga
- Çömlekçi, Bigadiç
- Çömlekçi, Çaycuma
