= Yukarıdere =

Yukarıdere can refer to:

- Yukarıdere, Çaycuma
- Yukarıdere, Ilgaz
- Yukarıdere, Ulus
