= Kadıoğlu =

Kadıoğlu may refer to:

== People ==
- Ferdi Kadıoğlu (born 1999), Turkish footballer

== Places ==
- Kadıoğlu, Çaycuma, a village in Zonguldak Province, Turkey
- Kadıoğlu, Düzce, a village in Düzce Province, Turkey
- Kadıoğlu, Kastamonu, a village in Kastamonu Province, Turkey
- Kadıoğlu, Vezirköprü, a neighbourhood in Samsun Province, Turkey
- Kadıoğlu Tunnel, part of the Samsun-Ordu Highway in Turkey
