= Kışla =

Kışla (literally "barracks" in Turkish) may refer to the following places in Turkey:

- Kışla, Çaycuma
- Kışla, Kazan

== See also ==
- Qishlaq
- Qishlah
