= Karamusa =

Karamusa can refer to:

- Karamusa, Çaycuma
- Karamusa, Çermik
- Karamusa, Şabanözü
