= Yazıbaşı =

Yazıbaşı may refer to:

- Yazıbaşı, Adıyaman
- Yazıbaşı, Çaycuma
- Yazıbaşı, Demirözü
- Yazıbaşı, Karaisalı
- Yazıbaşı, Kovancılar
