= Uluköy =

Uluköy (literally "almighty village" in Turkish) may refer to the following places in Turkey:

- Uluköy, Bartın, a village in Bartın Province
- Uluköy, Çaycuma, a village in Zonguldak Province
- Uluköy, Çerkeş, a village in Çankırı Province
- Uluköy, Dinar, a village in Afyonkarahisar Province
- Uluköy, Erzincan, a village in Erzincan Province
- Uluköy, Ezine, a village in Çanakkale Province
- Uluköy, Hocalar, a village in Afyonkarahisar Province
- Uluköy, İnebolu, a village in Kastamonu Province
- Uluköy, Kızıltepe, a neighbourhood in Mardin Province
- Uluköy, Kurtalan, a village in Siirt Province
- Uluköy, Nallıhan, a village in Ankara Province
- Uluköy, Taşova, a town in Amasya Province
- Uluköy, Ulus, a village in Bartın Province
- Uluköy, former name of Alaçam, a town in Samsun Province
- Uluköy Dam, in Amasya Province
