= Derecikören =

Derecikören can refer to the following villages in Turkey:

- Derecikören, Çaycuma
- Derecikören, Gölpazarı
- Derecikören, Sındırgı
