= Esenlik =

Esenlik can refer to:

- Esenlik, Alacakaya
- Esenlik, Çaycuma
