= Aliköy =

Aliköy may refer to the following villages in Turkey:

- Aliköy, Azdavay
- Aliköy, Çaycuma
