= Yazıköy =

Yazıköy can refer to:

- Yazıköy, Çaycuma
- Yazıköy, Gerede
- Yazıköy, Ilgaz
- Yazıköy, Kocaköy
- Yazıköy, Refahiye
