= Knock Knock (company) =

American gift company and book publisher

- Industry: Gifts, Book Publishing, Stationery
- Founded: 2002
- Founder: Jen Bilik
- Headquarters: Los Angeles, USA
- Area served: Worldwide
- Website: knockknockstuff.com

Knock Knock is an American gift company and book publisher founded by Jen Bilik on January 1, 2002. The company is based in Los Angeles, California. Bilik, previously a book editor, launched Knock Knock in 2002 with the proceeds from the sale of her Manhattan apartment.

In January 2018, Knock Knock acquired Emily McDowell Studio (renamed Em & Friends) and Sisters of Los Angeles (renamed People, Places & Things). The three individual companies are now under one umbrella: the newly formed Los Angeles based Who's There Group.

== Products and publications ==
In 2007, Knock Knock began publishing humorous nonfiction including How to Traumatize Your Children: 7 Proven Methods to Help You Screw Up Your Kids Deliberately and with Skill.
