= Çomaklar, Devrek =

Çomaklar
- Village
- Location within Turkey
- Country: Turkey
- Province: Zonguldak
- District: Devrek
- Population (2022): 102
- Time zone: UTC+3 (TRT)

Çomaklar is a village in Devrek District, Zonguldak Province, Turkey. Its population is 102 (2022). The village is located approximately 4 kilometres from the Devrek town centre and about 60 kilometres from the Zonguldak provincial capital. Çomaklar has retained its current name since at least 1892. Over recent decades, the village's population has declined, reflecting a broader trend of rural depopulation in the region.
