= Ereğli District, Zonguldak =

District of Zonguldak Province, Turkey

Ereğli District
- District
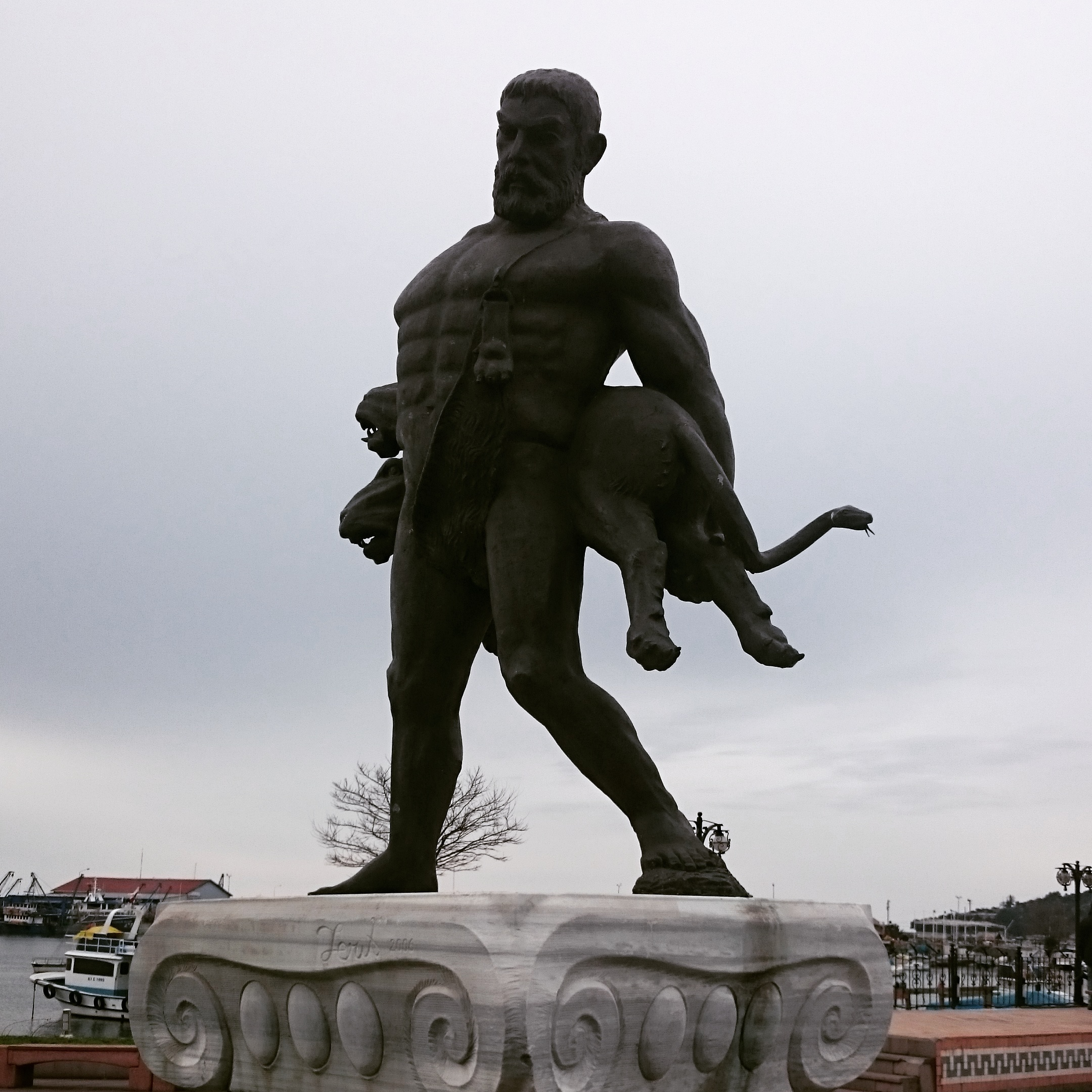
- statue of Herakles in Ereğli

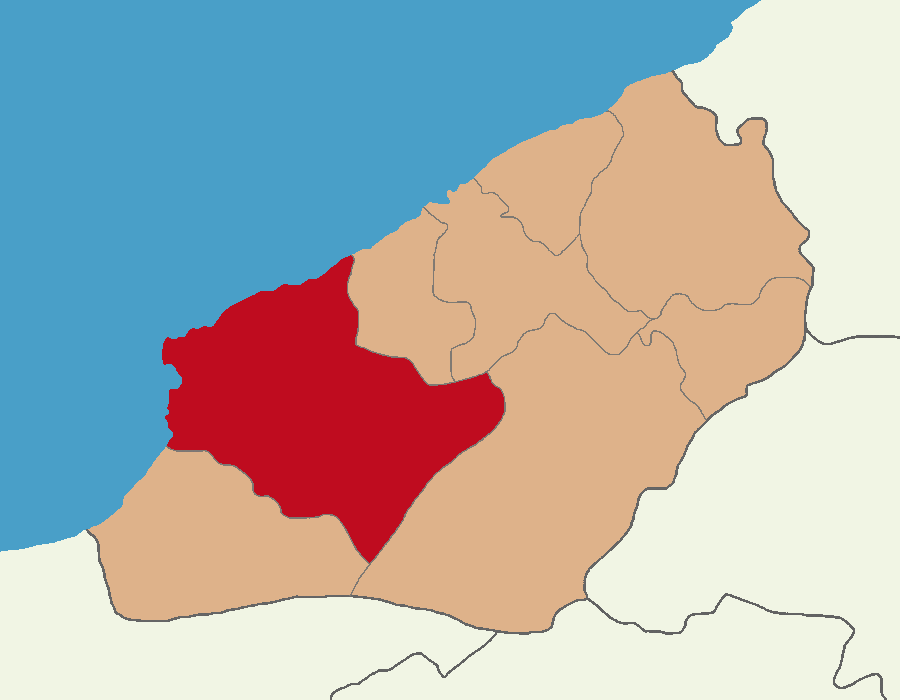
- Map showing Ereğli District in Zonguldak Province

- Location within Turkey
- Coordinates: 41°16′N 31°25′E
- Country: Turkey
- Province: Zonguldak
- Seat: Karadeniz Ereğli

Government
  - Kaymakam: Mehmet Yapıcı
- Area: 736 km^{2} (284 sq mi)
- Population (2022): 175,309
  - Density: 238/km^{2} (617/sq mi)
- Time zone: UTC+3 (TRT)
- Website: www.karadenizeregli.gov.tr

Ereğli District is a district of the Zonguldak Province of Turkey. Its seat is the city of Karadeniz Ereğli. Its area is 736 km^{2}, and its population is 175,309 (2022).

== Composition ==
There are four municipalities in Ereğli District:

- Gülüç
- Kandilli
- Karadeniz Ereğli
- Ormanlı

There are 93 villages in Ereğli District:

- Abdiköy
- Akkaya
- Akköy
- Alacabük
- Alaplısofular
- Artıklar
- Aşağıhocalar
- Aşağıkayalıdere
- Asarlı
- Aydın
- Aydınlar
- Bakırlık
- Ballıca
- Başören
- Başörendoğancılar
- Bayat
- Çamlıbel
- Çayırlı
- Çaylıoğlu
- Cemaller
- Çevlik
- Çiğdemli
- Çömlekçi
- Dağlıca
- Danişmentli
- Davutlar
- Dedeler
- Düzpelit
- Elmacı
- Emirali
- Esenköy
- Esenler
- Fındıklı
- Gebeköy
- Güllük
- Güneşli
- Güzelyurt
- Hacıosmanlar
- Hacıuslu
- Halaşlı
- Hasankahyalar
- Hasbeyler
- İmranlar
- Işıklı
- İskenderli
- Karakavuz
- Kaymaklar
- Keşkek
- Ketenciler
- Kızılca
- Kızılcapınar
- Kirencik
- Külah
- Kurtlar
- Öğberler
- Ormanlı
- Ortacı
- Ortaköy
- Osmanlar
- Ovaköy
- Pembeciler
- Pınarcık
- Ramazanlı
- Rüşanlar
- Sakallar
- Saltuklu
- Şamlar
- Sarıkaya
- Serintepe
- Sofular
- Soğanlıyürük
- Sücüllü
- Süleymanbeyler
- Sütlüce
- Tepeören
- Terziköy
- Topallı
- Toyfanlı
- Üçköy
- Uludağ
- Üveyikli
- Vakıf
- Velidağ
- Yalnızçam
- Yaraşlıyürük
- Yazıcılar
- Yazıören
- Yenidoğancılar
- Yeniköy
- Yeşilköy
- Yukarıhocalar
- Yunuslu
- Zindancılar
