= Başlarkadı =

- Village
- Location within Turkey
- Coordinates: 41°10′N 31°56′E
- Country: Turkey
- Province: Zonguldak
- District: Devrek
- Population (2022): 343
- Time zone: UTC+3 (TRT)

Başlarkadı is a village in Devrek District, Zonguldak Province, Turkey. Its population is 343 (2022). The village is located about 4.5 km west of Ahmetoğlu.
