= Emily McDowell =

American illustrator and writer

Emily McDowell is a writer, illustrator, speaker, teacher, advisor, and entrepreneur. She is the founder and former creative director of Em & Friends, formerly known as Emily McDowell Studio. Following the brand's 2022 acquisition by Union Square Publishing, McDowell is no longer with the company. In 2015, she was named one of Slate’s 10 Designers Who are Changing the World. McDowell has collaborated with Elizabeth Gilbert, Lisa Congdon, Sheryl Sandberg’s Option B Foundation, and Knock Knock.

== Career ==
After college, McDowell worked in advertising as a writer and creative director but grew frustrated with the industry and left to pursue her writing and art in other ways. While searching for her next venture, she noticed that the sentiments in classic greeting cards did not reflect the real-world experiences of the people she knew, particularly surrounding difficult subjects like grief, loss, and illness. Inspired to fill this gap, Emily began to create cards for what she calls “the relationships we really have.”

McDowell's first popular card went viral on Valentine's Day of 2012. The card read: “I know we’re not, like, together or anything but it felt weird not to say anything so I got you this card. It’s not a big deal. It doesn’t really mean anything. There isn’t even a heart on it. So basically it’s a card saying hi. Forget it.” It sold over 1,700 copies in one week and provided the springboard for her business. Emily's work was then picked up by Urban Outfitters and other large retailers.

McDowell's first book, There Is No Good Card For This: What To Say and Do When Life Gets Scary, Awful, and Unfair To People You Love, co-authored with Dr. Kelsey Crowe, was released in January 2017.

== Empathy cards ==
McDowell was diagnosed with Stage 3 Hodgkin’s lymphoma at the age of 24. She has stated that one of the most difficult parts of her experience was “the loneliness and isolation I felt when many of my close friends and family members disappeared because they didn’t know what to say, or said the absolute wrong thing without realizing it.” Her experience as a cancer patient combined with the experience of losing a close friend to cancer inspired her to create a series of greeting cards known as "Empathy Cards" which is her most popular line to date. Empathy cards are designed for people dealing with grief and loss using frank, and often humorous, language. McDowell stated that her goal is to create "better, more authentic ways to communicate about sickness and suffering."
