= Bakırcılar, Devrek =

Bakırcılar
- Village
- Location in Turkey
- Coordinates: 41.2656°N 31.9848°E
- Country: Turkey
- Province: Zonguldak
- District: Devrek
- Population (2022): 127
- Time zone: UTC+3 (TRT)

Bakırcılar is a village in Devrek District, Zonguldak Province, Turkey. Its population is 127 (2022). Bakırcılar is located about 3 km east of Yılanlıca.
