= Kayıkçılar, Çaycuma =

Kayıkçılar
- Neighbourhood
- Location in Turkey
- Coordinates: 41°23′N 32°05′E
- Country: Turkey
- Province: Zonguldak
- District: Çaycuma
- Municipality: Çaycuma
- Population (2022): 1,320
- Time zone: UTC+3 (TRT)

Kayıkçılar is a neighbourhood of the town Çaycuma, Çaycuma District, Zonguldak Province, Turkey. Its population is 1,320 (2022).
