= Bilik (surname) =

Bilik is a surname of several possible origins.

- Jerry Bilik (born 1933), American composer
- Jen Bilik (born 1969), publisher
- René Bílik (born 1960), Slovak university professor and literary scholar
