= Kozlu District =

District of Zonguldak Province, Turkey

- District
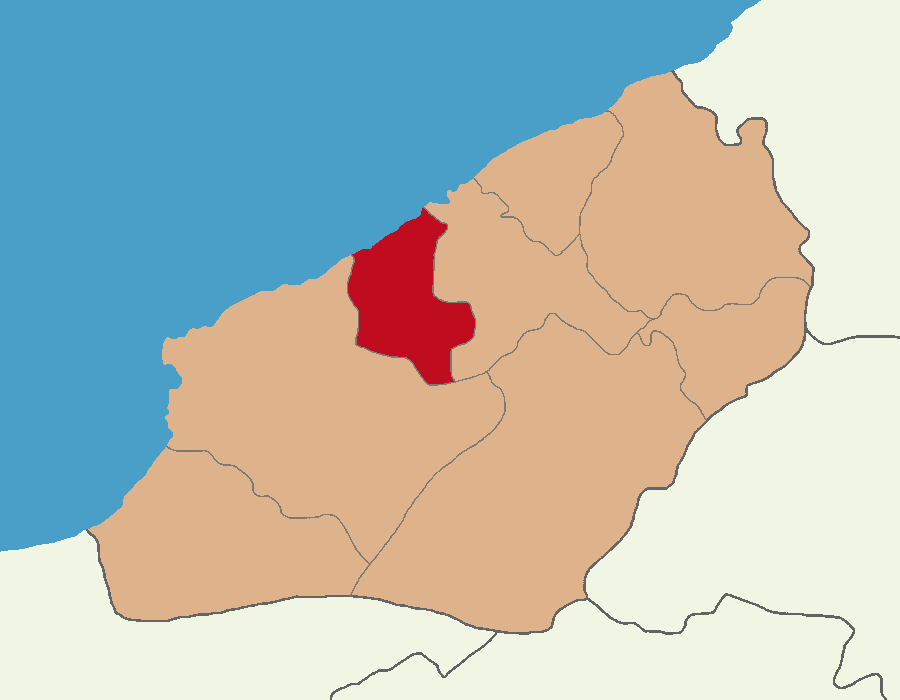
- Map showing Kozlu District in Zonguldak Province

- Location in Turkey
- Coordinates: 41°22′N 31°43′E
- Country: Turkey
- Province: Zonguldak
- Seat: Kozlu

Government
  - Kaymakam: Hüseyin Ece
- Area: 177 km^{2} (68 sq mi)
- Population (2022): 49,767
  - Density: 280/km^{2} (730/sq mi)
- Time zone: UTC+3 (TRT)
- Website: www.kozlu.gov.tr

Kozlu District is a district of the Zonguldak Province of Turkey. Its seat is the town of Kozlu. Its area is 177 km^{2}, and its population is 49,767 (2022). The district was established in 2012.

== Composition ==
There is one municipality in Kozlu District:

- Kozlu

There are 23 villages in Kozlu District:

- Akşeyh
- Aşağıçayır
- Balçıklı
- Bozca
- Çamköy
- Çardaş
- Çırgan
- Dağköy
- Dereköy
- Ebegümeci
- Enseköy
- Futa
- Gücek
- Kargalar
- Kızılcakese
- Köserecik
- Kozluköy
- Örencik
- Sakaköy
- Seyfetler
- Sivriler
- Üçköy
- Uzungüney
