= Devrek District =

District of Zonguldak Province, Turkey

- District
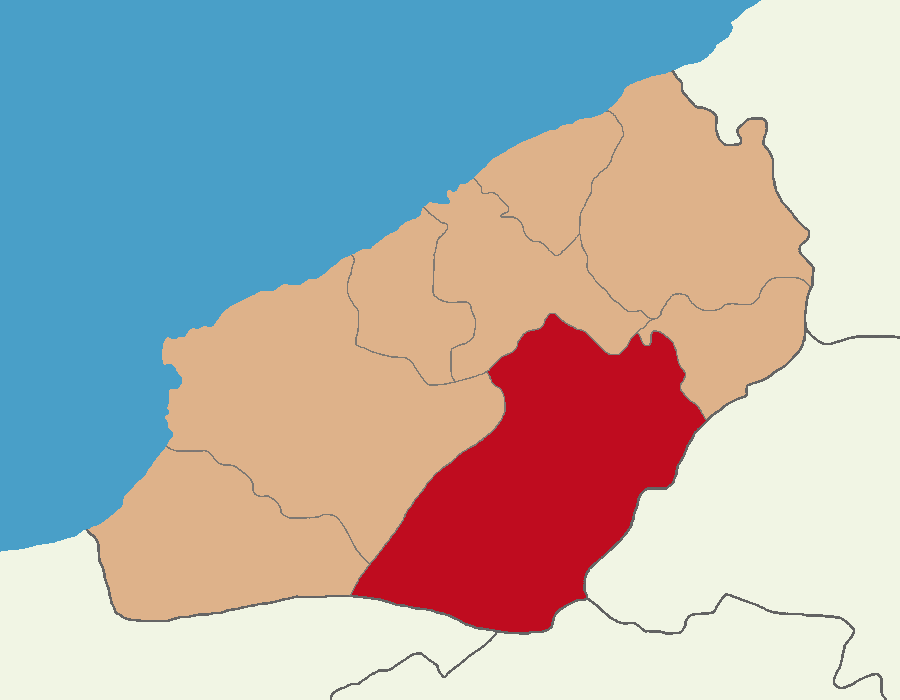
- Map showing Devrek District in Zonguldak Province

- Location in Turkey
- Coordinates: 41°14′N 31°58′E
- Country: Turkey
- Province: Zonguldak
- Seat: Devrek

Government
  - Kaymakam: Ümit Altay
- Area: 953 km^{2} (368 sq mi)
- Population (2022): 57,069
  - Density: 60/km^{2} (160/sq mi)
- Time zone: UTC+3 (TRT)
- Website: www.devrek.gov.tr

Devrek District is a district of the Zonguldak Province of Turkey. Its seat is the town of Devrek. Its area is 953 km^{2}, and its population is 57,069 (2022).

== Composition ==
There are two municipalities in Devrek District:

- Çaydeğirmeni
- Devrek

There are 83 villages in Devrek District:

- Adatepe
- Ahmetoğlu
- Akçabey
- Akçasu
- Aksu
- Alparslan
- Ataköy
- Bakırcılar
- Başlarkadı
- Bılık
- Bölücek
- Bükköy
- Burhanoğlu
- Çağlar
- Çolakpehlivan
- Çomaklar
- Çorak
- Dedeoğlu
- Derebulaca
- Durupınar
- Eğerci
- Erenler
- Ermekoğlu
- Eveyikli
- Gümüşpınar
- Gürbüzler
- Gürçeşme
- Güzelyurt
- Halilbeyoğlu
- Hatipler
- Hışıroğlu
- Hüseyinçavuşoğlu
- İsabeyli
- İslamköy
- Kabaca
- Karabaşlı
- Karacaören
- Karakoçlu
- Komşular
- Kozluçay
- Kozlugüney
- Kozlukadı
- Kurudere
- Kuzca
- Madencioğlu
- Mahmutoğlu
- Mekekler
- Müfettişler
- Mumcuoğlu
- Müstakimler
- Nizamlar
- Oğuzhan
- Osmanbeyler
- Özbağı
- Özpınar
- Özyurt
- Pelitli
- Pınarönü
- Purtuloğlu
- Sabunlar
- Sarnaz
- Serdaroğlu
- Seyisoğlu
- Sipahiler
- Sofular
- Tabaklar
- Taşkesen
- Tellioğlu
- Tohumlar
- Tosunlar
- Türkmenoğlu
- Velibeyler
- Yağmurca
- Yassıören
- Yazıcık
- Yazıcıoğlu
- Yeniköy
- Yeşilada
- Yeşilköy
- Yeşilöz
- Yeşilyurt
- Yılanlıca
- Yılanlıcakuz
