= Hışıroğlu, Devrek =

Hışıroğlu
- Village
- Location within Turkey
- Coordinates: 41°14′N 32°00′E
- Country: Turkey
- Province: Zonguldak
- District: Devrek
- Population (2022): 381
- Time zone: UTC+3 (TRT)

Hışıroğlu is a village in Devrek District, Zonguldak Province, Turkey. Its population is 381 (2022).
