= Burhanoğlu =

- Village
- Location within Turkey
- Coordinates: 41°16′N 32°02′E
- Country: Turkey
- Province: Zonguldak
- District: Devrek
- Population (2022): 475
- Time zone: UTC+3 (TRT)

Burhanoğlu is a village in Devrek District, Zonguldak Province, Turkey. Its population is 475 (2022). It is located approximately 2.5 km northwest of Osmankahya.
