= Türkmenoğlu, Devrek =

Türkmenoğlu
- Village
- Location within Turkey
- Coordinates: 41.163611°N 31.822778°E
- Country: Turkey
- Province: Zonguldak
- District: Devrek
- Population (2022): 159
- Time zone: UTC+3 (TRT)

Türkmenoğlu is a village in Devrek District, Zonguldak Province, Turkey. Its population is 159 (2022).
