= Kuzca, Devrek =

Kuzca
- Village
- Location within Turkey
- Country: Turkey
- Province: Zonguldak
- District: Devrek
- Population (2022): 127
- Time zone: UTC+3 (TRT)

Kuzca is a village in Devrek District, Zonguldak Province, Turkey. Its population is 127 (2022).
