= Coburlar, Çaycuma =

Coburlar
- Village
- Location within Turkey
- Coordinates: 41°30′50″N 32°08′25″E
- Country: Turkey
- Province: Zonguldak
- District: Çaycuma
- Population (2022): 501
- Time zone: UTC+3 (TRT)

Coburlar is a village in Çaycuma District, Zonguldak Province, Turkey. Its population is 501 (2022).
