= Çorak, Çaycuma =

Çorak
- Village
- Location within Turkey
- Coordinates: 41.5136°N 32.1200°E
- Country: Turkey
- Province: Zonguldak
- District: Çaycuma
- Population (2022): 290
- Time zone: UTC+3 (TRT)

Çorak is a village in Çaycuma District, Zonguldak Province, Turkey. Its population is 290 (2022).
