= Eğerci =

- Village
- Location within Turkey
- Coordinates: 41°06′N 31°49′E
- Country: Turkey
- Province: Zonguldak
- District: Devrek
- Elevation: 260 m (850 ft)
- Population (2022): 673
- Time zone: UTC+3 (TRT)
- Postal code: 67840
- Area code: 0372

Eğerci (also called Eyerci) is a village in Devrek District of Zonguldak Province, Turkey. Its population is 673 (2022). Before the 2013 reorganisation, it was a town (belde). It is situated along a tributary of Filyos River. The distance to Devrek is 28 kilometres (17 mi). The settlement was a stop in caravan routes during the Ottoman era and it was named after saddle (Turkish: eyer) makers. In 1986, it was declared a seat of township. A textile factory and forestry are the main sources of revenue for the town. Tourism (camping and hunting) is also promising.
