= Hacıosmanlar, Çaycuma =

Hacıosmanlar
- Village
- Location within Turkey
- Coordinates: 41.38026°N 32.28249°E
- Country: Turkey
- Province: Zonguldak
- District: Çaycuma
- Population (2022): 379
- Time zone: UTC+3 (TRT)

Hacıosmanlar is a village in Çaycuma District, Zonguldak Province, Turkey. Its population is 379 (2022).
