= Kozlugüney =

- Village
- Location within Turkey
- Coordinates: 41°07′40″N 31°51′50″E
- Country: Turkey
- Province: Zonguldak
- District: Devrek
- Population (2022): 74
- Time zone: UTC+3 (TRT)

Kozlugüney is a village in Devrek District, Zonguldak Province, Turkey. Its population is 74 (2022).
