= Yeniköy, Devrek =

Yeniköy
- Village
- Location within Turkey
- Country: Turkey
- Province: Zonguldak
- District: Devrek
- Population (2022): 279
- Time zone: UTC+3 (TRT)

Yeniköy is a village in Devrek District, Zonguldak Province, Turkey. Its population is 279 (2022).
