= Ramazanoğlu, Çaycuma =

Ramazanoğlu
- Village
- Location within Turkey
- Coordinates: 41°31′N 32°09′E
- Country: Turkey
- Province: Zonguldak
- District: Çaycuma
- Population (2022): 373
- Time zone: UTC+3 (TRT)

Ramazanoğlu is a village in Çaycuma District, Zonguldak Province, Turkey. Its population is 373 (2022).
