= Çayır, Çaycuma =

Çayır
- Village
- Location within Turkey
- Country: Turkey
- Province: Zonguldak
- District: Çaycuma
- Population (2022): 771
- Time zone: UTC+3 (TRT)

Çayır is a village in Çaycuma District, Zonguldak Province, Turkey. Its population is 771 (2022).
