= Güzeloğlu, Çaycuma =

Güzeloğlu
- Village
- Location within Turkey
- Coordinates: 41°28′N 32°11′E
- Country: Turkey
- Province: Zonguldak
- District: Çaycuma
- Population (2022): 742
- Time zone: UTC+3 (TRT)

Güzeloğlu is a village in Çaycuma District, Zonguldak Province, Turkey. Its population is 742 (2022).
