= Güzelyaka, Çaycuma =

Güzelyaka
- Village
- Location within Turkey
- Country: Turkey
- Province: Zonguldak
- District: Çaycuma
- Population (2022): 565
- Time zone: UTC+3 (TRT)

Güzelyaka is a village in Çaycuma District, Zonguldak Province, Turkey. Its population is 565 (2022).
