= Kalafatlı, Çaycuma =

Kalafatlı
- Village
- Location within Turkey
- Country: Turkey
- Province: Zonguldak
- District: Çaycuma
- Population (2022): 556
- Time zone: UTC+3 (TRT)

Kalafatlı is a village in Çaycuma District, Zonguldak Province, Turkey. Its population is 556 (2022).
