= Karacaören, Devrek =

Karacaören
- Village
- Location within Turkey
- Country: Turkey
- Province: Zonguldak
- District: Devrek
- Population (2022): 367
- Time zone: UTC+3 (TRT)

Karacaören is a village in Devrek District, Zonguldak Province, Turkey. Its population is 367 (2022).
