= Dereköy, Kozlu =

Dereköy
- Village
- Location within Turkey
- Coordinates: 41.3261°N 31.8036°E
- Country: Turkey
- Province: Zonguldak
- District: Kozlu
- Population (2022): 128
- Time zone: UTC+3 (TRT)

Dereköy is a village in Kozlu District, Zonguldak Province, Turkey. Its population is 128 (2022).
