= Bozca, Kozlu =

Bozca
- Village
- Location within Turkey
- Coordinates: 41.3300°N 31.7811°E
- Country: Turkey
- Province: Zonguldak
- District: Kozlu
- Population (2022): 189
- Time zone: UTC+3 (TRT)

Bozca is a village in Kozlu District, Zonguldak Province, Turkey. Its population is 189 (2022).
