= Örencik, Kozlu =

Örencik
- Village
- Location within Turkey
- Country: Turkey
- Province: Zonguldak
- District: Kozlu
- Population (2022): 327
- Time zone: UTC+3 (TRT)

Örencik is a village in Kozlu District, Zonguldak Province, Turkey. Its population is 327 (2022).
