= Aşağıihsaniye, Çaycuma =

Aşağıihsaniye
- Village
- Location within Turkey
- Coordinates: 41°33′N 32°05′E
- Country: Turkey
- Province: Zonguldak
- District: Çaycuma
- Population (2022): 149
- Time zone: UTC+3 (TRT)

Aşağıihsaniye is a village in Çaycuma District, Zonguldak Province, Turkey. Its population is 149 (2022).
