= Hüseyinçavuşoğlu =

- Village
- Location within Turkey
- Coordinates: 41°19′N 31°56′E
- Country: Turkey
- Province: Zonguldak
- District: Devrek
- Population (2022): 271
- Time zone: UTC+3 (TRT)

Hüseyinçavuşoğlu is a village in Devrek District, Zonguldak Province, Turkey. Its population is 271 (2022).
