= Koramanlar, Çaycuma =

Koramanlar
- Village
- Location within Turkey
- Coordinates: 41°25′N 32°11′E
- Country: Turkey
- Province: Zonguldak
- District: Çaycuma
- Population (2022): 1,278
- Time zone: UTC+3 (TRT)

Koramanlar is a village in Çaycuma District, Zonguldak Province, Turkey. Its population is 1,278 (2022).
