= Çırgan, Kozlu =

Çırgan
- Village
- Location within Turkey
- Coordinates: 41°18′N 31°44′E
- Country: Turkey
- Province: Zonguldak
- District: Kozlu
- Population (2022): 210
- Time zone: UTC+3 (TRT)

Çırgan is a village in Kozlu District, Zonguldak Province, Turkey. Its population is 210 (2022).
