= Yılanlıcakuz =

- Village
- Location in Turkey
- Coordinates: 41°15′N 31°56′E
- Country: Turkey
- Province: Zonguldak
- District: Devrek
- Population (2022): 238
- Time zone: UTC+3 (TRT)

Yılanlıcakuz is a village in Devrek District, Zonguldak Province, Turkey. Its population is 238 (2022).
