= Kerimler, Çaycuma =

Kerimler
- Village
- Location within Turkey
- Coordinates: 41°23′37″N 32°8′13″E
- Country: Turkey
- Province: Zonguldak
- District: Çaycuma
- Population (2022): 1,335
- Time zone: UTC+3 (TRT)

Kerimler is a village in Çaycuma District, Zonguldak Province, Turkey. Its population is 1,335 (2022).
