= Seyfetler, Kozlu =

Seyfetler
- Village
- Location within Turkey
- Coordinates: 41°22′N 31°39′E
- Country: Turkey
- Province: Zonguldak
- District: Kozlu
- Population (2022): 218
- Time zone: UTC+3 (TRT)

Seyfetler is a village in Kozlu District, Zonguldak Province, Turkey. Its population is 218 (2022).
