= İsabeyli, Devrek =

İsabeyli
- Village
- Location within Turkey
- Country: Turkey
- Province: Zonguldak
- District: Devrek
- Population (2022): 272
- Time zone: UTC+3 (TRT)

İsabeyli is a village in Devrek District, Zonguldak Province, Turkey. Its population is 272 (2022).
