= Çamlık, Çaycuma =

Çamlık
- Village
- Location within Turkey
- Coordinates: 41.4938°N 32.1194°E
- Country: Turkey
- Province: Zonguldak
- District: Çaycuma
- Population (2022): 158
- Time zone: UTC+3 (TRT)

Çamlık is a village in Çaycuma District, Zonguldak Province, Turkey. Its population is 158 (2022).
