= Kozluköy, Kozlu =

Kozluköy
- Village
- Location within Turkey
- Coordinates: 41°24′N 31°45′E
- Country: Turkey
- Province: Zonguldak
- District: Kozlu
- Population (2022): 246
- Time zone: UTC+3 (TRT)

Kozluköy is a village in Kozlu District, Zonguldak Province, Turkey. Its population is 246 (2022).
