= Ataköy, Devrek =

Ataköy
- Village
- Location within Turkey
- Coordinates: 41.1478°N 31.9501°E
- Country: Turkey
- Province: Zonguldak
- District: Devrek
- Population (2022): 414
- Time zone: UTC+3 (TRT)

Ataköy is a village in Devrek District, Zonguldak Province, Turkey. Its population is 414 (2022). The village is situated southwest of Ahmetoğlu and forms part of a rural district surrounded by forests and mountains typical of the Black Sea region.
