= Dağköy, Kozlu =

Dağköy
- Village
- Location within Turkey
- Coordinates: 41°20′05″N 31°40′30″E
- Country: Turkey
- Province: Zonguldak
- District: Kozlu
- Population (2022): 267
- Time zone: UTC+3 (TRT)

Dağköy is a village in Kozlu District, Zonguldak Province, Turkey. Its population is 267 (2022).
