= Guček =

Guček is a Slovene surname. Notable people with the surname include:

- Luka Guček (born 1999), Slovene footballer
- Matic Ian Guček (born 2003), Slovene hurdler
