= Kabaca, Devrek =

Kabaca
- Village
- Location within Turkey
- Coordinates: 41.300278°N 31.919444°E
- Country: Turkey
- Province: Zonguldak
- District: Devrek
- Population (2022): 340
- Time zone: UTC+3 (TRT)

Kabaca is a village in Devrek District, Zonguldak Province, Turkey. Its population is 340 (2022).
