= Eveyikli =

- Village
- Location within Turkey
- Coordinates: 41°08′20″N 31°49′30″E
- Country: Turkey
- Province: Zonguldak
- District: Devrek
- Population (2022): 145
- Time zone: UTC+3 (TRT)

Eveyikli is a village in Devrek District, Zonguldak Province, Turkey. Its population is 145 (2022).
