= Hatipler, Devrek =

Hatipler
- Village
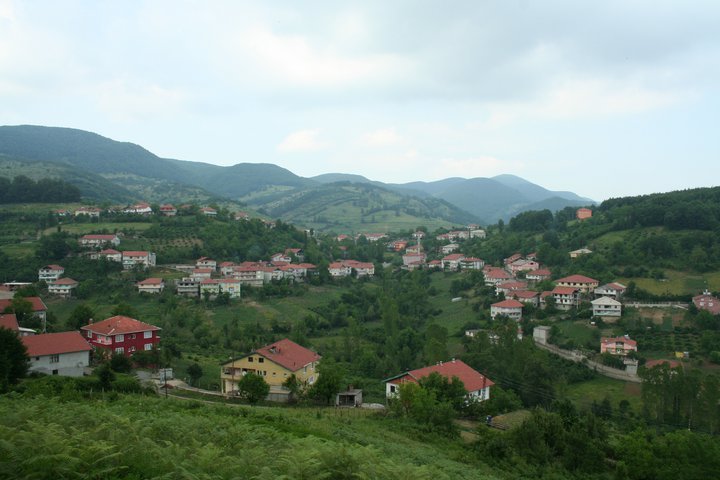
- General view of the village (before March 2015)

- Location within Turkey
- Coordinates: 41.2766°N 31.8683°E
- Country: Turkey
- Province: Zonguldak
- District: Devrek
- Population (2022): 208
- Time zone: UTC+3 (TRT)

Hatipler is a village in Devrek District, Zonguldak Province, Turkey. Its population is 208 (2022).
