= Ebegümeci, Kozlu =

Ebegümeci
- Village
- Location within Turkey
- Coordinates: 41°18′N 31°42′E
- Country: Turkey
- Province: Zonguldak
- District: Kozlu
- Population (2022): 267
- Time zone: UTC+3 (TRT)

Ebegümeci is a village in Kozlu District, Zonguldak Province, Turkey. Its population is 267 (2022).
