= İslamköy, Devrek =

İslamköy
- Village
- Location within Turkey
- Coordinates: 41.324722°N 31.943889°E
- Country: Turkey
- Province: Zonguldak
- District: Devrek
- Population (2022): 175
- Time zone: UTC+3 (TRT)

İslamköy is a village in Devrek District, Zonguldak Province, Turkey. Its population is 175 (2022).
