= İhsanoğlu, Çaycuma =

İhsanoğlu
- Village
- Location within Turkey
- Coordinates: 41°31′56″N 32°11′34″E
- Country: Turkey
- Province: Zonguldak
- District: Çaycuma
- Population (2022): 687
- Time zone: UTC+3 (TRT)

İhsanoğlu is a village in Çaycuma District, Zonguldak Province, Turkey. Its population is 687 (2022).
