= Balçıklı, Kozlu =

Balçıklı
- Village
- Location within Turkey
- Coordinates: 41°20′33″N 31°44′31″E
- Country: Turkey
- Province: Zonguldak
- District: Kozlu
- Population (2022): 145
- Time zone: UTC+3 (TRT)

Balçıklı is a village in Kozlu District, Zonguldak Province, Turkey. Its population is 145 (2022).
