= Ermekoğlu =

- Village
- Location within Turkey
- Coordinates: 41°14′N 31°54′E
- Country: Turkey
- Province: Zonguldak
- District: Devrek
- Population (2022): 122
- Time zone: UTC+3 (TRT)

Ermekoğlu is a village in Devrek District, Zonguldak Province, Turkey. Its population is 122 (2022).
