= Helvacılar, Çaycuma =

Helvacılar
- Village
- Location within Turkey
- Coordinates: 41°22′49″N 32°10′6″E
- Country: Turkey
- Province: Zonguldak
- District: Çaycuma
- Population (2022): 1,238
- Time zone: UTC+3 (TRT)

Helvacılar is a village in Çaycuma District, Zonguldak Province, Turkey. Its population is 1,238 (2022).
