= Dereköseler, Çaycuma =

Dereköseler
- Village
- Location within Turkey
- Coordinates: 41°21′N 32°09′E
- Country: Turkey
- Province: Zonguldak
- District: Çaycuma
- Population (2022): 1,057
- Time zone: UTC+3 (TRT)

Dereköseler is a village in Çaycuma District, Zonguldak Province, Turkey. Its population is 1,057 (2022).
