= Tellioğlu, Devrek =

Tellioğlu
- Village
- Country: Turkey
- Province: Zonguldak
- District: Devrek
- Population (2022): 206
- Time zone: UTC+3 (TRT)

Tellioğlu is a village in Devrek District, Zonguldak Province, Turkey. Its population is 206 (as of 2022).
