= Madenler, Çaycuma =

Madenler
- Village
- Location within Turkey
- Coordinates: 41.402°N 32.267°E
- Country: Turkey
- Province: Zonguldak
- District: Çaycuma
- Population (2022): 521
- Time zone: UTC+3 (TRT)

Madenler is a village in Çaycuma District, Zonguldak Province, Turkey. Its population is 521 (2022).
