= Müstakimler, Devrek =

Müstakimler
- Village
- Location within Turkey
- Country: Turkey
- Province: Zonguldak
- District: Devrek
- Population (2022): 107
- Time zone: UTC+3 (TRT)

Müstakimler is a village in Devrek District, Zonguldak Province, Turkey. Its population is 107 (2022).
