= Özbağı, Devrek =

Özbağı
- Village
- Location within Turkey
- Country: Turkey
- Province: Zonguldak
- District: Devrek
- Population (2022): 358
- Time zone: UTC+3 (TRT)

Özbağı is a village in Devrek District, Zonguldak Province, Turkey. Its population is 358 (2022). Before the 2013 reorganisation, it was a town (belde).
