= Çağlar, Devrek =

Çağlar
- Village
- Location within Turkey
- Coordinates: 41.2916°N 31.8980°E
- Country: Turkey
- Province: Zonguldak
- District: Devrek
- Population (2022): 292
- Time zone: UTC+3 (TRT)

Çağlar is a village in Devrek District, Zonguldak Province, Turkey. Its population is 292 (2022).
