= Kargalar, Kozlu =

Kargalar
- Village
- Location within Turkey
- Country: Turkey
- Province: Zonguldak
- District: Kozlu
- Population (2022): 403
- Time zone: UTC+3 (TRT)

Kargalar is a village in Kozlu District, Zonguldak Province, Turkey. Its population is 403 (2022).
