= Bölücek, Devrek =

Bölücek
- Village
- Location within Turkey
- Coordinates: 41.3097°N 31.9805°E
- Country: Turkey
- Province: Zonguldak
- District: Devrek
- Population (2022): 504
- Time zone: UTC+3 (TRT)

Bölücek is a village in Devrek District, Zonguldak Province, Turkey. Its population is 504 (2022). It lies within a rural, mountainous area characteristic of the Black Sea region and is situated near the Bölücek-Beycuma road.
