= Kozlukadı, Devrek =

Kozlukadı
- Village
- Location within Turkey
- Coordinates: 41°07′45″N 31°50′40″E
- Country: Turkey
- Province: Zonguldak
- District: Devrek
- Population (2022): 125
- Time zone: UTC+3 (TRT)

Kozlukadı is a village in Devrek District, Zonguldak Province, Turkey. Its population is 125 (2022). It is located approximately 159 km north-west of Ankara
