= Kızılcakese, Kozlu =

Kızılcakese
- Village
- Location within Turkey
- Coordinates: 41°23′3″N 31°42′47″E
- Country: Turkey
- Province: Zonguldak
- District: Kozlu
- Population (2022): 422
- Time zone: UTC+3 (TRT)

Kızılcakese is a village in Kozlu District, Zonguldak Province, Turkey. Its population is 422 (2022).
