= Yeşilöz, Devrek =

Yeşilöz
- Village
- Location within Turkey
- Coordinates: 41°2′28″N 31°48′5″E
- Country: Turkey
- Province: Zonguldak
- District: Devrek
- Population (2022): 307
- Time zone: UTC+3 (TRT)

Yeşilöz is a village in Devrek District, Zonguldak Province, Turkey. Its population is 307 (2022).
