= Yukarıgöynük, Çaycuma =

Yukarıgöynük
- Village
- Location within Turkey
- Coordinates: 41°31′N 32°02′E
- Country: Turkey
- Province: Zonguldak
- District: Çaycuma
- Population (2022): 249
- Time zone: UTC+3 (TRT)

Yukarıgöynük is a village in Çaycuma District, Zonguldak Province, Turkey. Its population is 249 (2022).
