= Sarnaz, Devrek =

Sarnaz
- Village
- Location within Turkey
- Coordinates: 41°07′N 31°50′E
- Country: Turkey
- Province: Zonguldak
- District: Devrek
- Population (2022): 72
- Time zone: UTC+3 (TRT)

Sarnaz is a village in Devrek District, Zonguldak Province, Turkey. Its population is 72 (2022).
