= Musausta, Çaycuma =

Musausta
- Village
- Location within Turkey
- Coordinates: 41°25′N 32°14′E
- Country: Turkey
- Province: Zonguldak
- District: Çaycuma
- Population (2022): 403
- Time zone: UTC+3 (TRT)

Musausta is a village in Çaycuma District, Zonguldak Province, Turkey. Its population is 403 (2022).
