= Serdaroğlu, Çaycuma =

Serdaroğlu
- Village
- Location within Turkey
- Coordinates: 41°28′N 32°13′E
- Country: Turkey
- Province: Zonguldak
- District: Çaycuma
- Population (2022): 499
- Time zone: UTC+3 (TRT)

Serdaroğlu (formerly: Gökçe Hatipler and Turfa Hatipler) is a village in Çaycuma District, Zonguldak Province, Turkey. Its population is 499 (2022).
