= Dağüstü, Çaycuma =

Dağüstü
- Village
- Location within Turkey
- Country: Turkey
- Province: Zonguldak
- District: Çaycuma
- Population (2022): 382
- Time zone: UTC+3 (TRT)

Dağüstü is a village in Çaycuma District, Zonguldak Province, Turkey. Its population is 382 (2022).
