= Oğuzhan, Devrek =

Oğuzhan
- Village
- Location within Turkey
- Coordinates: 41.286°N 32.016°E
- Country: Turkey
- Province: Zonguldak
- District: Devrek
- Population (2022): 403
- Time zone: UTC+3 (TRT)

Oğuzhan is a village in Devrek District, Zonguldak Province, Turkey. Its population is 403 (2022).
