= Mumcuoğlu =

- Village
- Location within Turkey
- Coordinates: 41°14′N 31°53′E
- Country: Turkey
- Province: Zonguldak
- District: Devrek
- Population (2022): 189
- Time zone: UTC+3 (TRT)

Mumcuoğlu is a village in Devrek District, Zonguldak Province, Turkey. Its population is 189 (2022).
