= Yazıcık, Devrek =

Yazıcık
- Village
- Location within Turkey
- Coordinates: 41.0308°N 31.9089°E
- Country: Turkey
- Province: Zonguldak
- District: Devrek
- Population (2022): 601
- Time zone: UTC+3 (TRT)

Yazıcık is a village in Devrek District, Zonguldak Province, Turkey. Its population is 601 (2022).
