= Akçahatipler, Çaycuma =

Akçahatipler
- Village
- Location within Turkey
- Coordinates: 41°23′N 32°16′E
- Country: Turkey
- Province: Zonguldak
- District: Çaycuma
- Population (2022): 488
- Time zone: UTC+3 (TRT)

Akçahatipler is a village in Çaycuma District, Zonguldak Province, Turkey. Its population is 488 (2022).
