= Muharremşah, Çaycuma =

Muharremşah
- Village
- Location within Turkey
- Coordinates: 41°21′49″N 32°11′45″E
- Country: Turkey
- Province: Zonguldak
- District: Çaycuma
- Population (2022): 1,067
- Time zone: UTC+3 (TRT)

Muharremşah is a village in Çaycuma District, Zonguldak Province, Turkey. Its population is 1,067 (2022).
