= Adatepe, Devrek =

Adatepe
- Village
- Location within Turkey
- Coordinates: 41.0652°N 31.8551°E
- Country: Turkey
- Province: Zonguldak
- District: Devrek
- Population (2022): 263
- Time zone: UTC+3 (TRT)

Adatepe is a village in Devrek District, Zonguldak Province, Turkey. As of 2022, its population is 263.
