= Temenler, Çaycuma =

Temenler
- Village
- Location within Turkey
- Coordinates: 41°31′N 32°04′E
- Country: Turkey
- Province: Zonguldak
- District: Çaycuma
- Population (2022): 251
- Time zone: UTC+3 (TRT)

Temenler is a village in Çaycuma District, Zonguldak Province, Turkey. Its population is 251 (2022).
