= Aşağıçayır, Kozlu =

Aşağıçayır
- Village
- Location within Turkey
- Coordinates: 41°22′N 31°43′E
- Country: Turkey
- Province: Zonguldak
- District: Kozlu
- Population (2022): 146
- Time zone: UTC+3 (TRT)

Aşağıçayır is a village in Kozlu District. Zonguldak Province, Turkey. Its population is 146 (2022).
