= Akşeyh, Kozlu =

Akşeyh
- Village
- Location within Turkey
- Coordinates: 41°19′N 31°43′E
- Country: Turkey
- Province: Zonguldak
- District: Kozlu
- Population (2022): 194
- Time zone: UTC+3 (TRT)

Akşeyh is a village in Kozlu District, Zonguldak Province, Turkey. Its population is 194 (2022).
