= Jen Bilik =

American CEO

- Born: July 21, 1969 (age 57); Berkeley, California, United States
- Education: University of Michigan
- Occupations: Publisher and businessperson; founder and CEO of Knock Knock (company)
- Spouse: Brian Rosenberg (m. 2017)

Jen Bilik (born July 21, 1969) is the founder and CEO of Knock Knock, an American book and gift publishing company.

Bilik grew up in California, then moved to New York and later on ended up in publishing. She co-authored books such as, Todd Oldham: Without Boundaries and Women of Taste: A Collaboration Celebrating Quilt Artists and Chefs.

Bilik majored in English literature and film studies at the University of Michigan.
