= Çaylıoğlu =

- Village
- Location within Turkey
- Coordinates: 41°13′44″N 31°41′18″E
- Country: Turkey
- Province: Zonguldak
- District: Ereğli
- Elevation: 50 m (160 ft)
- Population (2022): 433
- Time zone: UTC+3 (TRT)
- Postal code: 67380
- Area code: 0372

Çaylıoğlu is a village in Ereğli District of Zonguldak Province, Turkey. Its population is 433 (2022). Before the 2013 reorganisation, it was a town (belde). It is situated east of Karadeniz Ereğli. The settlement was founded in 1800s by a clan from Haymana in Ankara Province. The name of the settlement refers to the name of the clan. In 1950 s the main economic activity of the settlement was services in manganese mines around. In 1996 it was declared a seat of township with the name Güneşli. However, in 2007 the former name was adopted.
