= Çomranlı, Çaycuma =

Çomranlı
- Village
- Location within Turkey
- Coordinates: 41°29′N 32°04′E
- Country: Turkey
- Province: Zonguldak
- District: Çaycuma
- Population (2022): 796
- Time zone: UTC+3 (TRT)

Çomranlı is a village in Çaycuma District, Zonguldak Province, Turkey. Its population is 796 (2022).
