= Güzelyurt, Çaycuma =

Güzelyurt
- Village
- Location within Turkey
- Coordinates: 41.3933°N 31.9955°E
- Country: Turkey
- Province: Zonguldak
- District: Çaycuma
- Population (2022): 320
- Time zone: UTC+3 (TRT)

Güzelyurt is a village in Çaycuma District, Zonguldak Province, Turkey. Its population is 320 (2022).
