= Karaahmetler, Çaycuma =

Karaahmetler
- Village
- Location within Turkey
- Country: Turkey
- Province: Zonguldak
- District: Çaycuma
- Population (2022): 442
- Time zone: UTC+3 (TRT)

Karaahmetler is a village in Çaycuma District, Zonguldak Province, Turkey. Its population is 442 (2022).
