= Karakoç, Çaycuma =

Karakoç
- Village
- Location within Turkey
- Country: Turkey
- Province: Zonguldak
- District: Çaycuma
- Population (2022): 607
- Time zone: UTC+3 (TRT)

Karakoç is a village in Çaycuma District, Zonguldak Province, Turkey. Its population is 607 (2022).
