= Çolakpehlivan =

- Village
- Location in Turkey
- Coordinates: 41°15′N 32°00′E
- Country: Turkey
- Province: Zonguldak
- District: Devrek
- Population (2022): 296
- Time zone: UTC+3 (TRT)

Çolakpehlivan is a village in Devrek District, Zonguldak Province, Turkey. Its population is 296 (2022).
