= Bükköy, Devrek =

Bükköy
- Village
- Location within Turkey
- Coordinates: 41.2959°N 32.0584°E
- Country: Turkey
- Province: Zonguldak
- District: Devrek
- Population (2022): 285
- Time zone: UTC+3 (TRT)

Bükköy (also: Bük) is a village in Devrek District, Zonguldak Province, Turkey. Its population is 285 (2022). The village is located about 2.5 km west of the nearby village Karaşanlı.
