= Pelitli, Devrek =

Pelitli
- Village
- Location within Turkey
- Country: Turkey
- Province: Zonguldak
- District: Devrek
- Population (2022): 251
- Time zone: UTC+3 (TRT)

Pelitli is a village in Devrek District, Zonguldak Province, Turkey. Its population is 251 (2022).
