= Güdüllü, Çaycuma =

Güdüllü
- Village
- Location within Turkey
- Coordinates: 41°26′N 31°59′E
- Country: Turkey
- Province: Zonguldak
- District: Çaycuma
- Population (2022): 326
- Time zone: UTC+3 (TRT)

Güdüllü is a village in Çaycuma District, Zonguldak Province, Turkey. Its population is 326 (2022).
