= Emirşah, Çaycuma =

Emirşah
- Village
- Location within Turkey
- Coordinates: 41.3897°N 32.2475°E
- Country: Turkey
- Province: Zonguldak
- District: Çaycuma
- Population (2022): 458
- Time zone: UTC+3 (TRT)

Emirşah is a village in Çaycuma District, Zonguldak Province, Turkey. Its population is 458 (2022).
