= Yeşilyurt, Devrek =

Yeşilyurt
- Village
- Location within Turkey
- Coordinates: 41.20389°N 31.86139°E
- Country: Turkey
- Province: Zonguldak
- District: Devrek
- Population (2022): 250
- Time zone: UTC+3 (TRT)

Yeşilyurt is a village in Devrek District, Zonguldak Province, Turkey. Its population is 250 (2022).
