= Perşembe, Zonguldak =

Perşembe
- Municipality
- Location within Turkey
- Coordinates: 41°25′N 32°10′E
- Country: Turkey
- Province: Zonguldak
- District: Çaycuma

Government
  - Mayor: İsmail İnam (CHP)
- Elevation: 310 m (1,020 ft)
- Population (2022): 2,671
- Time zone: UTC+3 (TRT)
- Postal code: 67960
- Area code: 0372
- Climate: Cfa
- Website: zonguldakpersembe.bel.tr

Perşembe (literally "Thursday", referring to market day) is a town (belde) in the Çaycuma District, Zonguldak Province, Turkey. Its population is 2,671 (2022). It is situated in the mountainous area which runs parallel to Black Sea coast. It is to the east of both Çaycuma and Zonguldak. The distance to Çaycuma is 7 kilometres (4.3 mi) and to Zonguldak is 59 kilometres (37 mi).

The settlement was probably founded four centuries ago. The original population of the village was composed of migrants from Caucasus (probably Kipchaks, a medieval Turkic people lived in what is now Russian steps and Caucasus). Also people from other parts of Turkey were settled in the village. The settlement was declared a seat of township in 1990.

== See also ==
- Cape Jason
