= Tosunlar, Devrek =

Tosunlar
- Village
- Location within Turkey
- Coordinates: 41.2708°N 31.9145°E
- Country: Turkey
- Province: Zonguldak
- District: Devrek
- Population (2022): 194
- Time zone: UTC+3 (TRT)

Tosunlar is a village in Devrek District, Zonguldak Province, Turkey. Its population is 194 (2022).
