= Başaran, Çaycuma =

Başaran
- Village
- Location within Turkey
- Coordinates: 41.5367°N 32.1502°E
- Country: Turkey
- Province: Zonguldak
- District: Çaycuma
- Population (2022): 238
- Time zone: UTC+3 (TRT)

Başaran is a village in Çaycuma District, Zonguldak Province, Turkey. Its population is 238 (2022).
