= Aksu, Devrek =

Aksu
- Village
- Location within Turkey
- Coordinates: 41.0799°N 31.7686°E
- Country: Turkey
- Province: Zonguldak
- District: Devrek
- Population (2022): 452
- Time zone: UTC+3 (TRT)

Aksu is a village in Devrek District, Zonguldak Province, Turkey. Its population is 452 (2022).
