= Dereli, Çaycuma =

Dereli
- Village
- Location within Turkey
- Country: Turkey
- Province: Zonguldak
- District: Çaycuma
- Population (2022): 322
- Time zone: UTC+3 (TRT)

Dereli is a village in Çaycuma District, Zonguldak Province, Turkey. Its population is 322 (2022).
