= Çorak, Devrek =

Çorak
- Village
- Location within Turkey
- Coordinates: 41.3019°N 32.0425°E
- Country: Turkey
- Province: Zonguldak
- District: Devrek
- Population (2022): 425
- Time zone: UTC+3 (TRT)

Çorak is a village in Devrek District, Zonguldak Province, Turkey. Its population is 425 (2022). Over past decades, Çorak has seen a gradual decline in population.
