= Enseköy, Kozlu =

Enseköy
- Village
- Location within Turkey
- Coordinates: 41°17′N 31°47′E
- Country: Turkey
- Province: Zonguldak
- District: Kozlu
- Population (2022): 245
- Time zone: UTC+3 (TRT)

Enseköy is a village in Kozlu District, Zonguldak Province, Turkey. Its population is 245 (2022).
