= Taşçılı, Çaycuma =

Taşçılı
- Village
- Location within Turkey
- Country: Turkey
- Province: Zonguldak
- District: Çaycuma
- Population (2022): 693
- Time zone: UTC+3 (TRT)

Taşçılı is a village in Çaycuma District, Zonguldak Province, Turkey. Its population is 693 (2022).
