= Yolgeçen, Çaycuma =

Yolgeçen
- Village
- Location within Turkey
- Coordinates: 41.4522°N 32.1533°E
- Country: Turkey
- Province: Zonguldak
- District: Çaycuma
- Population (2022): 648
- Time zone: UTC+3 (TRT)

Yolgeçen is a village in Çaycuma District, Zonguldak Province, Turkey. Its population is 648 (2022).
