= Dursunlar, Çaycuma =

Dursunlar
- Village
- Location within Turkey
- Country: Turkey
- Province: Zonguldak
- District: Çaycuma
- Population (2022): 824
- Time zone: UTC+3 (TRT)

Dursunlar is a village in Çaycuma District, Zonguldak Province, Turkey. Its population is 824 (2022).
