= Gökçetabaklar, Çaycuma =

Gökçetabaklar
- Village
- Location within Turkey
- Coordinates: 41°28′N 32°12′E
- Country: Turkey
- Province: Zonguldak
- District: Çaycuma
- Population (2022): 470
- Time zone: UTC+3 (TRT)

Gökçetabaklar is a village in Çaycuma District, Zonguldak Province, Turkey. Its population is 470 (2022).
