= Yakademirciler, Çaycuma =

Yakademirciler
- Village
- Location within Turkey
- Coordinates: 41°27′N 32°02′E
- Country: Turkey
- Province: Zonguldak
- District: Çaycuma
- Population (2022): 442
- Time zone: UTC+3 (TRT)

Yakademirciler is a village in Çaycuma District, Zonguldak Province, Turkey. Its population is 442 (2022).
