= Geriş, Çaycuma =

Geriş
- Village
- Location within Turkey
- Country: Turkey
- Province: Zonguldak
- District: Çaycuma
- Population (2022): 624
- Time zone: UTC+3 (TRT)

Geriş is a village in Çaycuma District, Zonguldak Province, Turkey. Its population is 624 (2022).
