= Muhsinler, Çaycuma =

Muhsinler
- Village
- Location within Turkey
- Coordinates: 41°22′N 32°10′E
- Country: Turkey
- Province: Zonguldak
- District: Çaycuma
- Population (2022): 783
- Time zone: UTC+3 (TRT)

Muhsinler is a village in Çaycuma District, Zonguldak Province, Turkey. Its population is 783 (2022).
