= Yeşilköy, Çaycuma =

Yeşilköy
- Village
- Country: Turkey
- Province: Zonguldak
- District: Çaycuma
- Population (2022): 162
- Time zone: UTC+3 (TRT)

Yeşilköy is a village in Çaycuma District, Zonguldak Province, Turkey. Its population is 162 (2022).
