= Hacıibadi, Çaycuma =

Hacıibadi
- Village
- Location within Turkey
- Coordinates: 41.42787°N 32.07865°E
- Country: Turkey
- Province: Zonguldak
- District: Çaycuma
- Population (2022): 806
- Time zone: UTC+3 (TRT)

Hacıibadi is a village in Çaycuma District, Zonguldak Province, Turkey. Its population is 806 (2022).
