= Tasmacı, Zonguldak =

Tasmacı
- Neighbourhood
- Country: Turkey
- Province: Zonguldak
- District: Zonguldak
- Municipality: Elvanpazarcık
- Population (2022): 521
- Time zone: UTC+3 (TRT)

Tasmacı is a neighbourhood of the town Elvanpazarcık, Zonguldak District, Zonguldak Province, Turkey. Its population is 521 (2022).
