= Köserecik, Kozlu =

Köserecik
- Village
- Location within Turkey
- Coordinates: 41°20′N 31°43′E
- Country: Turkey
- Province: Zonguldak
- District: Kozlu
- Population (2022): 170
- Time zone: UTC+3 (TRT)

Köserecik is a village in Kozlu District, Zonguldak Province, Turkey. Its population is 170 (2022).
