= Sivriler, Kozlu =

Sivriler
- Village
- Location within Turkey
- Coordinates: 41.3180°N 31.7680°E
- Country: Turkey
- Province: Zonguldak
- District: Kozlu
- Population (2022): 543
- Time zone: UTC+3 (TRT)

Sivriler is a village in Kozlu District, Zonguldak Province, Turkey. Its population is 543 (2022). Before the 2013 reorganisation, it was a town (belde).
