= Yağmurca, Devrek =

Yağmurca
- Village
- Location within Turkey
- Country: Turkey
- Province: Zonguldak
- District: Devrek
- Population (2022): 383
- Time zone: UTC+3 (TRT)

Yağmurca is a village in Devrek District, Zonguldak Province, Turkey. Its population is 383 (2022).
