= Komşular, Devrek =

Komşular
- Village
- Location within Turkey
- Country: Turkey
- Province: Zonguldak
- District: Devrek
- Population (2022): 216
- Time zone: UTC+3 (TRT)

Komşular is a village in Devrek District, Zonguldak Province, Turkey. Its population is 216 (2022).
