= Burunkaya, Çaycuma =

Burunkaya
- Village
- Location within Turkey
- Coordinates: 41.3838°N 32.0676°E
- Country: Turkey
- Province: Zonguldak
- District: Çaycuma
- Population (2022): 199
- Time zone: UTC+3 (TRT)

Burunkaya is a village in Çaycuma District, Zonguldak Province, Turkey. Its population is 199 (2022).
