= Gürbüzler, Devrek =

Gürbüzler
- Village
- Location within Turkey
- Coordinates: 41°7′48″N 31°57′43″E
- Country: Turkey
- Province: Zonguldak
- District: Devrek
- Population (2022): 362
- Time zone: UTC+3 (TRT)

Gürbüzler is a village in Devrek District, Zonguldak Province, Turkey. Its population is 362 (2022).
