= Serdaroğlu, Devrek =

Serdaroğlu
- Village
- Location within Turkey
- Coordinates: 41°07′N 31°49′E
- Country: Turkey
- Province: Zonguldak
- District: Devrek
- Population (2022): 73
- Time zone: UTC+3 (TRT)

Serdaroğlu is a village in Devrek District, Zonguldak Province, Turkey. Its population is 73 (2022).
