= Ayvazlar, Çaycuma =

Ayvazlar
- Village
- Location within Turkey
- Coordinates: 41.3931°N 32.0614°E
- Country: Turkey
- Province: Zonguldak
- District: Çaycuma
- Population (2022): 501
- Time zone: UTC+3 (TRT)

Ayvazlar is a village in Çaycuma District, Zonguldak Province, Turkey. Its population is 501 (2022).
