= Kurudere, Devrek =

Kurudere
- Village
- Location within Turkey
- Country: Turkey
- Province: Zonguldak
- District: Devrek
- Population (2022): 236
- Time zone: UTC+3 (TRT)

Kurudere is a village in Devrek District, Zonguldak Province, Turkey. Its population is 236 (2022).
