= Esentepe, Çaycuma =

Esentepe
- Village
- Location within Turkey
- Country: Turkey
- Province: Zonguldak
- District: Çaycuma
- Population (2022): 158
- Time zone: UTC+3 (TRT)

Esentepe is a village in Çaycuma District, Zonguldak Province, Turkey. Its population is 158 (2022).
