= Akpınar, Çaycuma =

Akpınar
- Village
- Location within Turkey
- Coordinates: 41.5134°N 32.0734°E
- Country: Turkey
- Province: Zonguldak
- District: Çaycuma
- Population (2022): 295
- Time zone: UTC+3 (TRT)

Akpınar is a village in Çaycuma District, Zonguldak Province, Turkey. Its population is 295 (2022).
