= Uzungüney, Kozlu =

Uzungüney
- Village
- Location within Turkey
- Coordinates: 41°22′N 31°42′E
- Country: Turkey
- Province: Zonguldak
- District: Kozlu
- Population (2022): 761
- Time zone: UTC+3 (TRT)

Uzungüney is a village in Kozlu District, Zonguldak Province, Turkey. Its population is 761 (2022).
