= Sofular, Devrek =

Sofular
- Village
- Location within Turkey
- Coordinates: 41.1608°N 31.8786°E
- Country: Turkey
- Province: Zonguldak
- District: Devrek
- Population (2022): 424
- Time zone: UTC+3 (TRT)

Sofular is a village in Devrek District, Zonguldak Province, Turkey. Its population is 424 (2022).
