= Kahvecioğlu, Çaycuma =

Kahvecioğlu
- Village
- Location within Turkey
- Country: Turkey
- Province: Zonguldak
- District: Çaycuma
- Population (2022): 324
- Time zone: UTC+3 (TRT)

Kahvecioğlu is a village in Çaycuma District, Zonguldak Province, Turkey. Its population is 324 (2022).
