= Karabaşlı, Devrek =

Karabaşlı
- Village
- Location within Turkey
- Coordinates: 41°18′N 32°05′E
- Country: Turkey
- Province: Zonguldak
- District: Devrek
- Population (2022): 290
- Time zone: UTC+3 (TRT)

Karabaşlı is a village in Devrek District, Zonguldak Province, Turkey. Its population is 290 (2022).
