= Özyurt, Devrek =

Özyurt
- Village
- Location within Turkey
- Coordinates: 41.070833°N 31.790833°E
- Country: Turkey
- Province: Zonguldak
- District: Devrek
- Population (2022): 192
- Time zone: UTC+3 (TRT)

Özyurt is a village in Devrek District, Zonguldak Province, Turkey. Its population is 192 (2022).
