= Çaycuma District =

District of Zonguldak Province, Turkey

- District
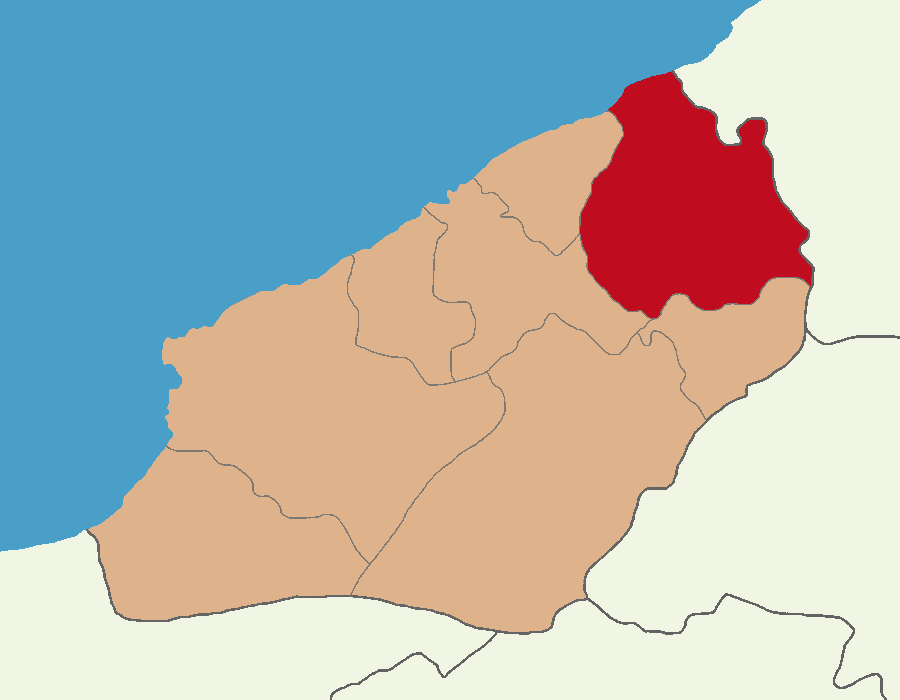
- Map showing Çaycuma District in Zonguldak Province

- Location in Turkey
- Coordinates: 41°27′N 32°06′E
- Country: Turkey
- Province: Zonguldak
- Seat: Çaycuma

Government
  - Kaymakam: Mehmet Göze
- Area: 492 km^{2} (190 sq mi)
- Population (2022): 90,583
  - Density: 180/km^{2} (480/sq mi)
- Time zone: UTC+3 (TRT)
- Website: www.caycuma.gov.tr

Çaycuma District is a district of the Zonguldak Province of Turkey. Its seat is the town of Çaycuma. Its area is 492 km^{2}, and its population is 90,583 (2022).

== Composition ==
There are six municipalities in Çaycuma District:

- Çaycuma
- Filyos
- Karapınar
- Nebioğlu
- Perşembe
- Saltukova

There are 82 villages in Çaycuma District:

- Adaköy
- Ahatlı
- Akçahatipler
- Akpınar
- Akyamaç
- Aliköy
- Aşağıihsaniye
- Aşağısarmaşık
- Ayvazlar
- Başaran
- Basat
- Burunkaya
- Çamlık
- Çayır
- Çayköy
- Coburlar
- Çömlekçi
- Çomranlı
- Çorak
- Dağüstü
- Derecikören
- Dereköseler
- Dereli
- Dursunlar
- Emirşah
- Erenköy
- Esenlik
- Esentepe
- Esenyurt
- Geriş
- Gökçeler
- Gökçetabaklar
- Güdüllü
- Güzeloğlu
- Güzelyaka
- Güzelyurt
- Hacıibadi
- Hacılar
- Hacıosmanlar
- Helvacılar
- İhsanoğlu
- Kadıoğlu
- Kahvecioğlu
- Kalafatlı
- Kalaycıoğlu
- Karaahmetler
- Karakoç
- Karamusa
- Kayabaşı
- Kerimler
- Kışla
- Kızılbel
- Koramanlar
- Madenler
- Muharremşah
- Muhsinler
- Musausta
- Ramazanoğlu
- Sandallar
- Sarmaşık
- Sazköy
- Serdaroğlu
- Şenköy
- Şeyhler
- Şeyhoğlu
- Sipahiler
- Taşçılı
- Temenler
- Torlaklar
- Uluköy
- Veliköy
- Yakademirciler
- Yazıbaşı
- Yazıköy
- Yeniköy
- Yeşilköy
- Yeşilyayla
- Yeşilyurt
- Yolgeçen
- Yukarıdere
- Yukarıgöynük
- Yukarıihsaniye
