= Gürçeşme, Devrek =

Village in Turkey

Gürçeşme
- Village
- Location within Turkey
- Coordinates: 41°12′52″N 31°55′27″E
- Country: Turkey
- Province: Zonguldak
- District: Devrek
- Population (2022): 123
- Time zone: UTC+3 (TRT)

Gürçeşme is a village in Devrek District, Zonguldak Province, Turkey. Its population is 123 (2022).
