= Erenler, Devrek =

Erenler
- Village
- Location within Turkey
- Country: Turkey
- Province: Zonguldak
- District: Devrek
- Population (2022): 293
- Time zone: UTC+3 (TRT)

Erenler is a village in Devrek District, Zonguldak Province, Turkey. Its population is 293 (2022).
