= Hacılar, Çaycuma =

Hacılar
- Village
- Location within Turkey
- Coordinates: 41°29′36″N 32°5′56″E
- Country: Turkey
- Province: Zonguldak
- District: Çaycuma
- Population (2022): 1,217
- Time zone: UTC+3 (TRT)

Hacılar is a village in Çaycuma District, Zonguldak Province, Turkey. Its population is 1,217 (2022).
