= Alparslan, Devrek =

Alparslan
- Village
- Location within Turkey
- Coordinates: 41.2496°N 32.0693°E
- Country: Turkey
- Province: Zonguldak
- District: Devrek
- Population (2022): 449
- Time zone: UTC+3 (TRT)

Alparslan is a village in Devrek District, Zonguldak Province, Turkey. Its population is 449 (2022).

Alparslan Asar Fortress is located near the Ömercioğlu quarter of Alparslan village in the Devrek District of Zonguldak Province, Turkey. The fortress is situated on a southern slope with natural rock formations supporting its structure, while remnants of defensive walls remain visible, particularly on the northern side. It is notable as a historical and archaeological site reflecting the region’s strategic importance over time.
