= Akyamaç, Çaycuma =

Akyamaç
- Village
- Location within Turkey
- Coordinates: 41.4680°N 32.0987°E
- Country: Turkey
- Province: Zonguldak
- District: Çaycuma
- Population (2022): 804
- Time zone: UTC+3 (TRT)

Akyamaç is a village in Çaycuma District, Zonguldak Province, Turkey. Its population is 804 (2022).
