= Gülüç =

- Municipality
- Location in Turkey
- Coordinates: 41°15′N 31°26′E
- Country: Turkey
- Province: Zonguldak
- District: Ereğli
- Population (2022): 8,271
- Time zone: UTC+3 (TRT)

Gülüç is a town (belde) in Ereğli District, Zonguldak Province, Turkey. Its population is 8,271 (2022). It is on the shore of the Black Sea, at the mouth of the Gülüç River. It is contiguous with the city of Karadeniz Ereğli. Gülüç is adjacent to the Erdemir steel plant.
