= Muslu, Zonguldak =

Muslu
- Municipality
- Location in Turkey
- Coordinates: 41°31′N 31°56′E
- Country: Turkey
- Province: Zonguldak
- District: Kilimli
- Population (2022): 1,548
- Time zone: UTC+3 (TRT)

Muslu is a town (belde) in the Kilimli District, Zonguldak Province, Turkey. Its population is 1,548 (2022).
