= Sipahiler, Çaycuma =

Sipahiler
- Village
- Location within Turkey
- Country: Turkey
- Province: Zonguldak
- District: Çaycuma
- Population (2022): 290
- Time zone: UTC+3 (TRT)

Sipahiler is a village in Çaycuma District, Zonguldak Province, Turkey. Its population is 290 (2022).
