= Yazıköy, Çaycuma =

Yazıköy
- Village
- Location within Turkey
- Coordinates: 41.40111°N 32.24417°E
- Country: Turkey
- Province: Zonguldak
- District: Çaycuma
- Population (2022): 383
- Time zone: UTC+3 (TRT)

Yazıköy is a village in Çaycuma District, Zonguldak Province, Turkey. Its population is 383 (2022).
