= Ormanlı, Ereğli =

Ormanlı
- Municipality
- Location in Turkey
- Coordinates: 41°11′28″N 31°36′18″E
- Country: Turkey
- Province: Zonguldak
- District: Ereğli
- Population (2022): 2,137
- Time zone: UTC+3 (TRT)

Ormanlı is a town (belde) in Ereğli District, Zonguldak Province, Turkey. Its population is 2,137 (2022).
