= Gücek, Kozlu =

Gücek
- Village
- Location within Turkey
- Country: Turkey
- Province: Zonguldak
- District: Kozlu
- Population (2022): 438
- Time zone: UTC+3 (TRT)

Gücek is a village in Kozlu District, Zonguldak Province, Turkey. Its population is 438 (2022).
