= Gümeli =

- Municipality
- Location in Turkey
- Coordinates: 41°07′N 31°37′E
- Country: Turkey
- Province: Zonguldak
- District: Alaplı
- Elevation: 500 m (1,600 ft)
- Population (2022): 1,869
- Time zone: UTC+3 (TRT)
- Postal code: 67850
- Area code: 0372

Gümeli is a forest town (belde) in the Alaplı District, Zonguldak Province, Turkey. Its population is 1,869 (2022). It is situated along Alaplı creek. The distance to Alaplı is 30 kilometres (19 mi). Gümeli is a relatively new settlement. In 1880s, It was founded by a group of families from Ordu, a city about 500 kilometres (310 mi) to the east. In 1988 a part of Gümeli was administratively issued from Gümeli to found Erenköy. In 1992, Gümeli was declared a seat of township.
