= Karaman, Zonguldak =

Karaman
- Municipality
- Location in Turkey
- Coordinates: 41°22′22″N 31°57′43″E
- Country: Turkey
- Province: Zonguldak
- District: Zonguldak
- Population (2022): 1,931
- Time zone: UTC+3 (TRT)

Karaman is a town (belde) in the Zonguldak District, Zonguldak Province, Turkey. Its population is 1,931 (2022).
