= Beycuma =

- Municipality
- Location in Turkey
- Coordinates: 41°20′N 31°58′E
- Country: Turkey
- Province: Zonguldak
- District: Zonguldak
- Elevation: 395 m (1,296 ft)
- Population (2022): 3,352
- Time zone: UTC+3 (TRT)
- Postal code: 67980
- Area code: 0372

Beycuma is a town (belde) in the Zonguldak District, Zonguldak Province, Turkey. Its population is 3,352 (2022). It is situated in the mountainous area at the south of Zonguldak. The distance to state highway D.750 is 7 kilometres (4.3 mi) and to Zonguldak is 29 kilometres (18 mi).

Beycuma, a former village, was declared a seat of township in 1994. Main agricultural products are cereals and corn.
