= Ahatlı, Alaplı =

Ahatlı
- Village
- Location within Turkey
- Coordinates: 41.1283°N 31.3980°E
- Country: Turkey
- Province: Zonguldak
- District: Alaplı
- Population (2022): 192
- Time zone: UTC+3 (TRT)

Ahatlı is a village in Alaplı District, Zonguldak Province, Turkey. Its population is 192 (2022).
