= Bılık, Devrek =

Village in Zonguldak Province, Turkey

Bılık
- Village
- Location within Turkey
- Coordinates: 41°14′N 32°02′E
- Country: Turkey
- Province: Zonguldak
- District: Devrek
- Population (2022): 418
- Time zone: UTC+3 (TRT)

Bılık is a village in Devrek District, Zonguldak Province, Turkey. Its population is 418 (2022).
