= Yazıcıoğlu, Devrek =

Yazıcıoğlu
- Village
- Location within Turkey
- Coordinates: 41°16′N 32°01′E
- Country: Turkey
- Province: Zonguldak
- District: Devrek
- Population (2022): 317
- Time zone: UTC+3 (TRT)

Yazıcıoğlu is a village in Devrek District, Zonguldak Province, Turkey. Its population is 317 (2022).
