= Aliköy, Çaycuma =

Aliköy
- Village
- Location within Turkey
- Coordinates: 41.391°N 32.041°E
- Country: Turkey
- Province: Zonguldak
- District: Çaycuma
- Population (2022): 564
- Time zone: UTC+3 (TRT)

Aliköy is a village in Çaycuma District, Zonguldak Province, Turkey. Its population is 564 (2022).
