= Çaydeğirmeni =

- Municipality
- Location in Turkey
- Coordinates: 41°17′N 32°04′E
- Country: Turkey
- Province: Zonguldak
- District: Devrek
- Elevation: 60 m (200 ft)
- Population (2022): 7,034
- Time zone: UTC+3 (TRT)
- Postal code: 67830
- Area code: 0372

Çaydeğirmeni is a town (belde) in the Devrek District, Zonguldak Province, Turkey. Its population is 7,034 (2022). It is situated in the valley of Alpaslan creek, a tributary of Yenice River. It is 12 kilometres (7.5 mi) north east of Devrek. The area around Çaydeğirmeni was inhabited from the 4th century BC (late Hellenistic period). The settlement was a stop on an ancient caravan route. The present town was founded in 1993 after a merger of two villages named Kemerler and Kaypaklar.
