= Akçasu, Devrek =

Akçasu
- Village
- Location within Turkey
- Coordinates: 41.2049°N 32.0536°E
- Country: Turkey
- Province: Zonguldak
- District: Devrek
- Population (2022): 226
- Time zone: UTC+3 (TRT)

Akçasu is a village in Devrek District, Zonguldak Province, Turkey. Its population is 226 (2022).

Akçasu village is also noted today as the location of the Bostandüzü Forest Recreation Area, a natural attraction in the region that covers approximately 3.5 hectares and is popular with visitors interested in nature and outdoor activities.
