= Esenyurt, Çaycuma =

Esenyurt
- Village
- Location within Turkey
- Country: Turkey
- Province: Zonguldak
- District: Çaycuma
- Population (2022): 87
- Time zone: UTC+3 (TRT)

Esenyurt is a village in Çaycuma District, Zonguldak Province, Turkey. Its population is 87 (2022).
