= Adaköy, Çaycuma =

Adaköy
- Village
- Location within Turkey
- Coordinates: 41.4496°N 32.1802°E
- Country: Turkey
- Province: Zonguldak
- District: Çaycuma
- Population (2022): 326
- Time zone: UTC+3 (TRT)

Adaköy is a village in Çaycuma District, Zonguldak Province, Turkey. Its population is 326 (2022).
