= Derecikören, Çaycuma =

Derecikören
- Village
- Location within Turkey
- Coordinates: 41.5486°N 32.0797°E
- Country: Turkey
- Province: Zonguldak
- District: Çaycuma
- Population (2022): 276
- Time zone: UTC+3 (TRT)

Derecikören is a village in Çaycuma District, Zonguldak Province, Turkey. Its population is 276 (2022).
