= Gelik, Zonguldak =

Gelik
- Municipality
- Location in Turkey
- Coordinates: 41°28′19″N 31°52′41″E
- Country: Turkey
- Province: Zonguldak
- District: Kilimli
- Population (2022): 2,726
- Time zone: UTC+3 (TRT)

Gelik is a town (belde) in the Kilimli District, Zonguldak Province, Turkey. Its population is 2,726 (2022).
