= Uluköy, Çaycuma =

Uluköy
- Village
- Location within Turkey
- Country: Turkey
- Province: Zonguldak
- District: Çaycuma
- Population (2022): 537
- Time zone: UTC+3 (TRT)

Uluköy is a village in Çaycuma District, Zonguldak Province, Turkey. Its population is 537 (2022).
