= Nebioğlu =

- Municipality
- Location within Turkey
- Coordinates: 41°26′N 32°15′E
- Country: Turkey
- Province: Zonguldak
- District: Çaycuma
- Elevation: 80 m (260 ft)
- Population (2022): 2,245
- Time zone: UTC+3 (TRT)
- Postal code: 67965
- Area code: 0372
- Climate: Cfa

Nebioğlu (former Karaevli) is a town (belde) in the Çaycuma District, Zonguldak Province, Turkey. Its population is 2,245 (2022). It is one of the easternmost settlements of the province. Distance to Çaycuma is 20 kilometres (12 mi). The town was established in 1999 by merging four nearby villages. Agriculture and dairying are two of the major economic sectors of the town.
