= Sarmaşık, Çaycuma =

Sarmaşık
- Village
- Location within Turkey
- Country: Turkey
- Province: Zonguldak
- District: Çaycuma
- Population (2022): 129
- Time zone: UTC+3 (TRT)

Sarmaşık is a village in Çaycuma District, Zonguldak Province, Turkey. Its population is 129 (2022).
