= Karapınar, Çaycuma =

Karapınar
- Municipality
- Location in Turkey
- Coordinates: 41°29′35″N 32°11′20″E
- Country: Turkey
- Province: Zonguldak
- District: Çaycuma
- Population (2022): 2,690
- Time zone: UTC+3 (TRT)

Karapınar is a town (belde) in the Çaycuma District, Zonguldak Province, Turkey. Its population is 2,690 (2022).
