= Kadıoğlu, Çaycuma =

Kadıoğlu
- Village
- Location within Turkey
- Coordinates: 41.420°N 32.026°E
- Country: Turkey
- Province: Zonguldak
- District: Çaycuma
- Population (2022): 572
- Time zone: UTC+3 (TRT)

Kadıoğlu is a village in Çaycuma District, Zonguldak Province, Turkey. Its population is 572 (2022).
