= Elvanpazarcık, Zonguldak =

Elvanpazarcık
- Municipality
- Location in Turkey
- Coordinates: 41°24′N 31°51′E
- Country: Turkey
- Province: Zonguldak
- District: Zonguldak
- Population (2022): 2,789
- Time zone: UTC+3 (TRT)

Elvanpazarcık is a town (belde) in the Zonguldak District, Zonguldak Province, Turkey. Its population is 2,789 (2022). It consists of 7 neighbourhoods: Cumhuriyet, Hayat, Elvan, Merkez, Tasmacı, Çalca and Celepcioğlu.
