= Karakoçlu, Devrek =

Karakoçlu
- Village
- Location within Turkey
- Coordinates: 41°12′N 31°53′E
- Country: Turkey
- Province: Zonguldak
- District: Devrek
- Population (2022): 361
- Time zone: UTC+3 (TRT)

Karakoçlu is a village in Devrek District, Zonguldak Province, Turkey. Its population is 361 (2022).
