= Çayköy, Alaplı =

Çayköy
- Village
- Location within Turkey
- Country: Turkey
- Province: Zonguldak
- District: Alaplı
- Population (2022): 270
- Time zone: UTC+3 (TRT)

Çayköy is a village in Alaplı District, Zonguldak Province, Turkey. Its population is 270 (2022).
