= Sipahiler, Devrek =

Sipahiler
- Village
- Location within Turkey
- Coordinates: 41.1219°N 31.8228°E
- Country: Turkey
- Province: Zonguldak
- District: Devrek
- Population (2022): 136
- Time zone: UTC+3 (TRT)

Sipahiler is a village in Devrek District, Zonguldak Province, Turkey. Its population is 136 (2022).
