= Saltukova =

- Municipality
- Location within Turkey
- Coordinates: 41°31′N 32°06′E
- Country: Turkey
- Province: Zonguldak
- District: Çaycuma
- Elevation: 135 m (443 ft)
- Population (2022): 3,993
- Time zone: UTC+3 (TRT)
- Postal code: 67970
- Area code: 0372
- Climate: Cfb

Saltukova is a town (belde) in the Çaycuma District, Zonguldak Province, Turkey. Its population is 3,993 (2022). It is situated between the two mountain ranges which run parallel to Black Sea. It is 15 kilometres (9.3 mi) north of Çaycuma and 45 kilometres (28 mi) east of Zonguldak.

The name of the town was mentioned in a 16th-century Ottoman documents as Arz'ı Saltuk or Saltukeli. After the construction of Ankara-Zonguldak railroad in 1939, the population of the settlement was increased. During the Second World War a military airport was constructed in Saltukova. Although it was abandoned after the war, in 2009 it was renewed and put into service as Zonguldak Airport. In 1988, the settlement was declared as a seat of township. A natural gas thermal plant is planned to be constructed in Saltukova.
