= Ahmetoğlu =

- Village
- Location within Turkey
- Coordinates: 41.1674°N 31.9939°E
- Country: Turkey
- Province: Zonguldak
- District: Devrek
- Population (2022): 253
- Time zone: UTC+3 (TRT)

Ahmetoğlu is a village in Devrek District, Zonguldak Province, Turkey. Its population is 253 (2022).
