= Yılanlıca =

- Village
- Location within Turkey
- Coordinates: 41°16′23″N 31°57′18″E
- Country: Turkey
- Province: Zonguldak
- District: Devrek
- Population (2022): 331
- Time zone: UTC+3 (TRT)

Yılanlıca is a village in Devrek District, Zonguldak Province, Turkey. Its population is 331 (2022).
