= Ahatlı, Çaycuma =

Ahatlı
- Village
- Location within Turkey
- Coordinates: 41.3988°N 32.1019°E
- Country: Turkey
- Province: Zonguldak
- District: Çaycuma
- Population (2022): 1,614
- Time zone: UTC+3 (TRT)

Ahatlı is a village in Çaycuma District, Zonguldak Province, Turkey. Its population is 1,614 (2022).
