= Dedeoğlu, Devrek =

Dedeoğlu
- Village
- Location within Turkey
- Country: Turkey
- Province: Zonguldak
- District: Devrek
- Population (2022): 343
- Time zone: UTC+3 (TRT)

Dedeoğlu is a village in Devrek District, Zonguldak Province, Turkey. Its population is 343 (2022).
