= Devrek =

- Municipality
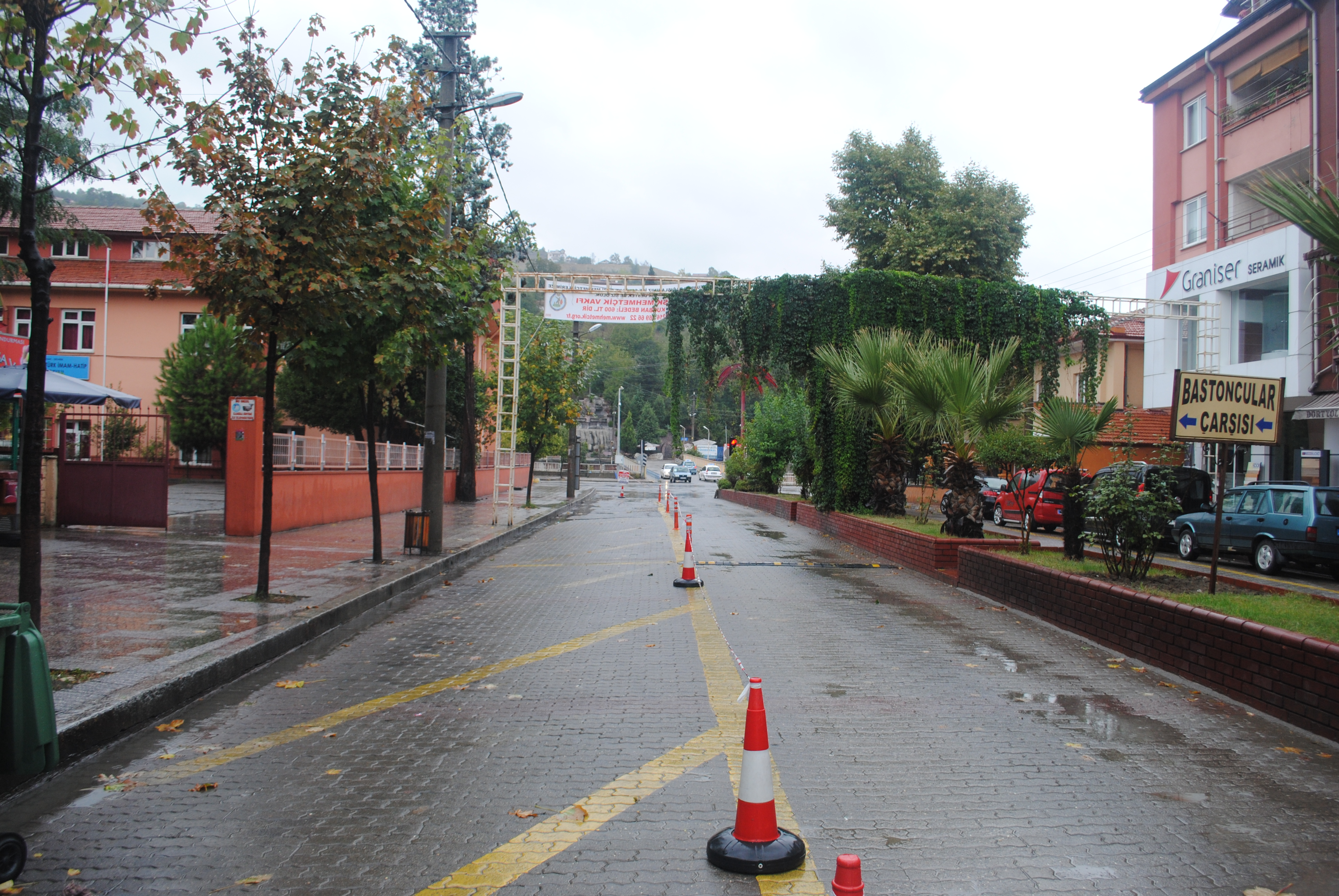

- Location within Turkey
- Coordinates: 41°13′31″N 31°57′37″E
- Country: Turkey
- Province: Zonguldak
- District: Devrek

Government
  - Mayor: Özcan Ulupınar (AKP)
- Elevation: 80 m (260 ft)
- Population (2022): 27,444
- Time zone: UTC+3 (TRT)
- Postal code: 67800
- Area code: 0372
- Climate: Cfa
- Website: www.devrek.bel.tr

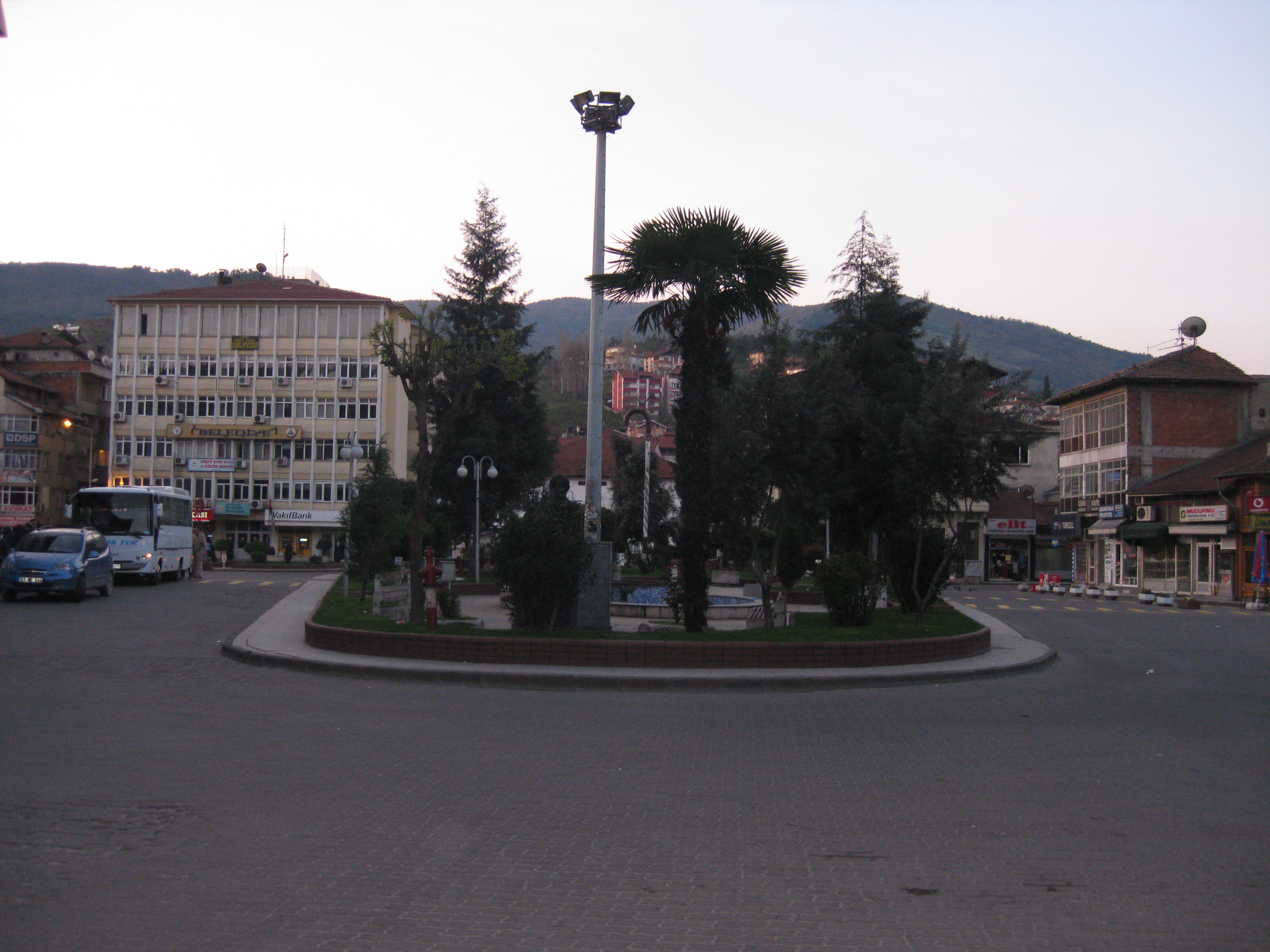
Devrek square

Devrek is a town in Zonguldak Province in the Black Sea Region of Turkey. It is the seat of Devrek District. Its population is 27,444 (2022). It was founded as Hamidiye, in the sanjak of Bolu. Devrek was incorporated into the Zonguldak Province on May 14, 1920. The mayor is Özcan Ulupınar (AKP).

Since 1984, in the third week of July, the Devrek Walking Stick and Culture Festival is held in the town. The most notable tourist destination in the area is Yedigöller National Park. During February and March there are pig hunting drives.

== Geography ==
Devrek is located in an altitude of 86 meters. It is 56 km from Zonguldak, 210 km from Ankara and 370 km from Istanbul. It is surrounded by mountains, the most notable ones being Babadağı, Göldağı, Akçasu and Yenice. The most important river passing through the region is Devrek creek. Devrek creek joins the Yenice creek in Gökçebey district and takes the name Filyos River. Pine, oak, fir, beech, elm, chestnut, and lime trees are found throughout the forest around Devrek. Its weather is cool during the summer and warm and rainy during the winter season.

== History ==
In the late 19th and early 20th century, Devrek was part of the Kastamonu Vilayet of the Ottoman Empire. The name of the district, which is known as both Hızırbeyili and Devrek, was founded on September 5, 1887. It has been referred to as 'Hamidiye' for twenty-three years following the name of Abdul Hamid II. The word meaning of the name of the district, which has been called Devrek again since 1910, means 'Monday' in Turkish, which has a reputation exceeding the boundaries of the region and is based on its market established in the district.

== International relations ==
Devrek is twinned with: Arua, Uganda Betio, Kiribati Moroni, Comoros

== Famous people from Devrek ==
- Işık Koşaner (born 1945), General staff officer
