= Çaycuma =

- Municipality
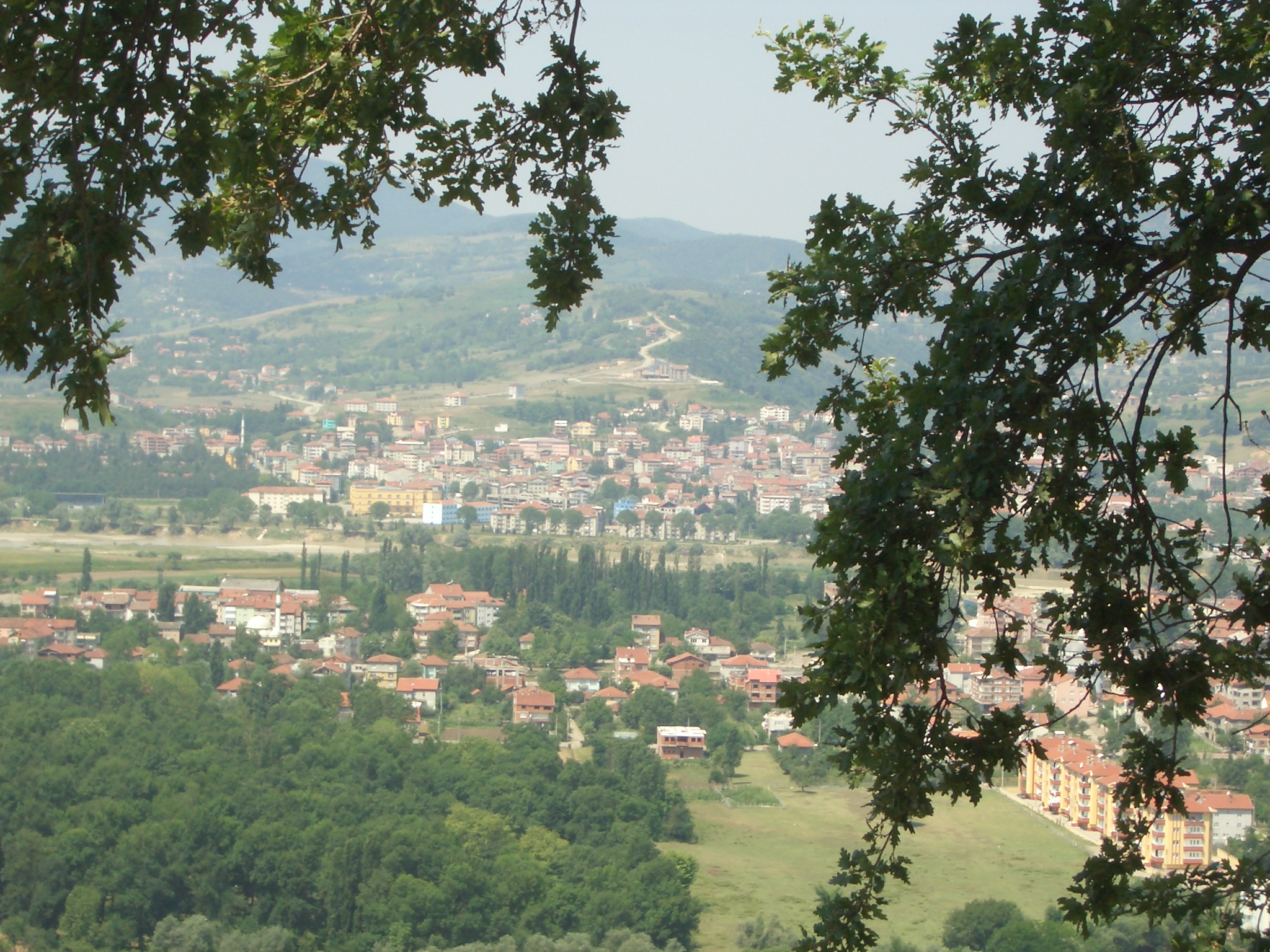

- Location within Turkey
- Coordinates: 41°25′36″N 32°04′33″E
- Country: Turkey
- Province: Zonguldak
- District: Çaycuma

Government
  - Mayor: Bülent Kantarcı (CHP)
- Elevation: 40 m (130 ft)
- Population (2022): 30,255
- Time zone: UTC+3 (TRT)
- Postal code: 67900
- Area code: 0372
- Website: www.caycuma.bel.tr

Çaycuma is a town in Zonguldak Province in the Black Sea region of Turkey. It is the seat of Çaycuma District. Its population is 30,255 (2022). The mayor is Bülent Kantarcı (CHP). Çaycuma is well known for yogurt in Zonguldak and Turkey. It consists of 11 neighbourhoods: Yeni Mahalle, Çay Mahallesi, Pehlivanlar, Istasyon, Gemiciler, Kayıkçılar, Karamusa, Karalar, Sofular, Velioğlu and Yeşiltepe.

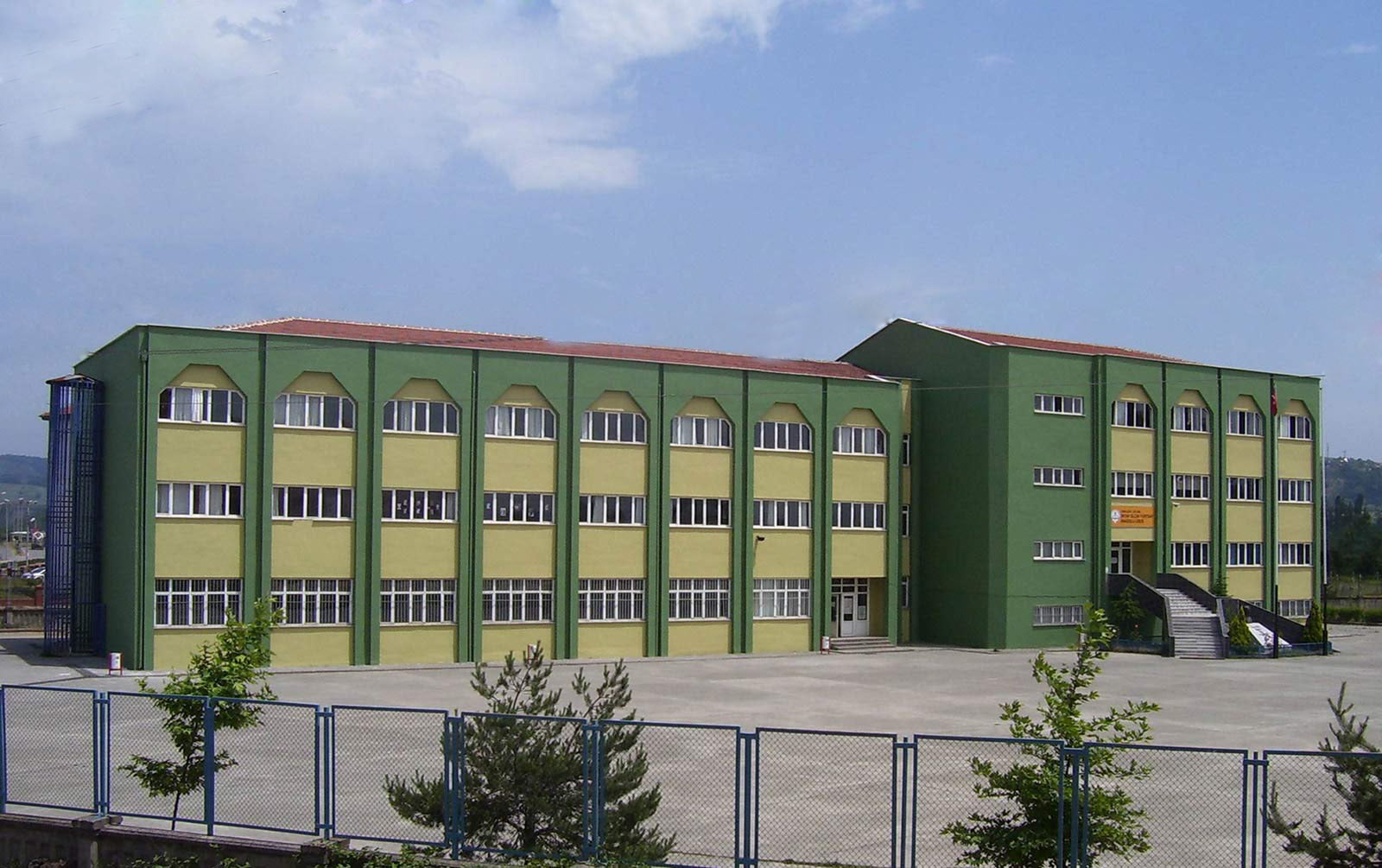
Oktay Olcay Yurtbay Anatolian High School in Çaycuma
