= Coal in Turkey =

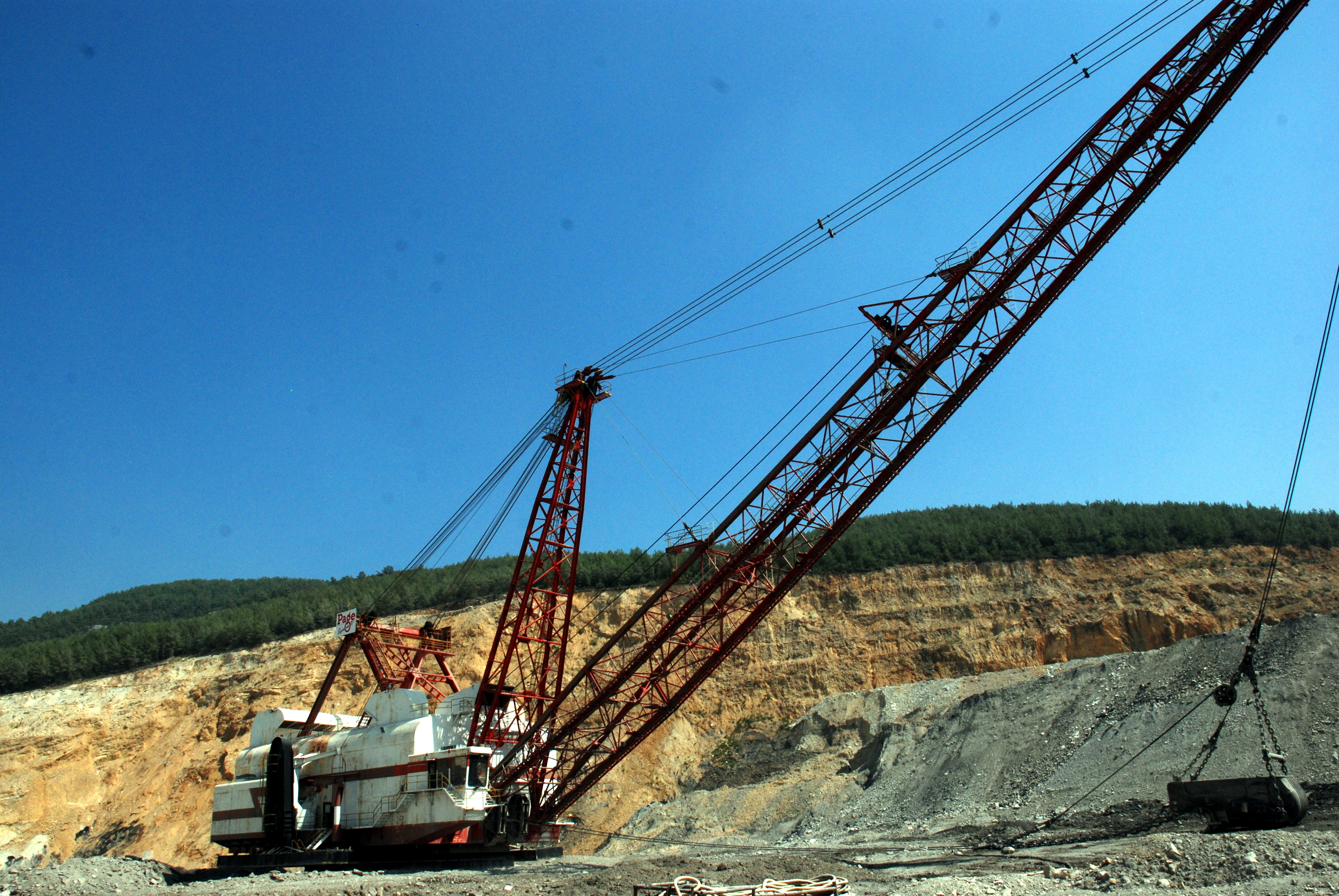
Government-owned Turkish Coal Operations Authority mine in Yeniköy, Milas

Coal supplies a quarter of Turkey's primary energy, and the country is one of the largest consumers in the world. The subsidised coal industry generates a third of the country's electricity and emits over a quarter of Turkey's greenhouse gases.

Coal is a major contributor to air pollution, and damages health across the nation, being burnt even in homes and cities. Most coal is burnt in power stations, and it is estimated that a phase out of coal power in Turkey by 2030 instead of by the 2050s would save over 100 thousand lives. Flue gas emission limits are in place, but data from mandatory reporting is not made public.

Over 90% of coal mined in Turkey is lignite (brown coal), which is more polluting than other types of coal. Turkey's energy policy encourages mining lignite for coal-fired power stations in order to reduce gas imports; and coal supplies over 40% of domestic energy production. Coal burning peaked in 2018, and mining in 2022 at about 100 million tonnes. Most coal is imported, as in contrast to local lignite production, Turkey imports most of its bituminous coal from Russia. The largest coalfield in Turkey is Elbistan. Turkey will host the 2026 United Nations Climate Change Conference, in which getting agreement on coal phase-out will be very important.

== History ==
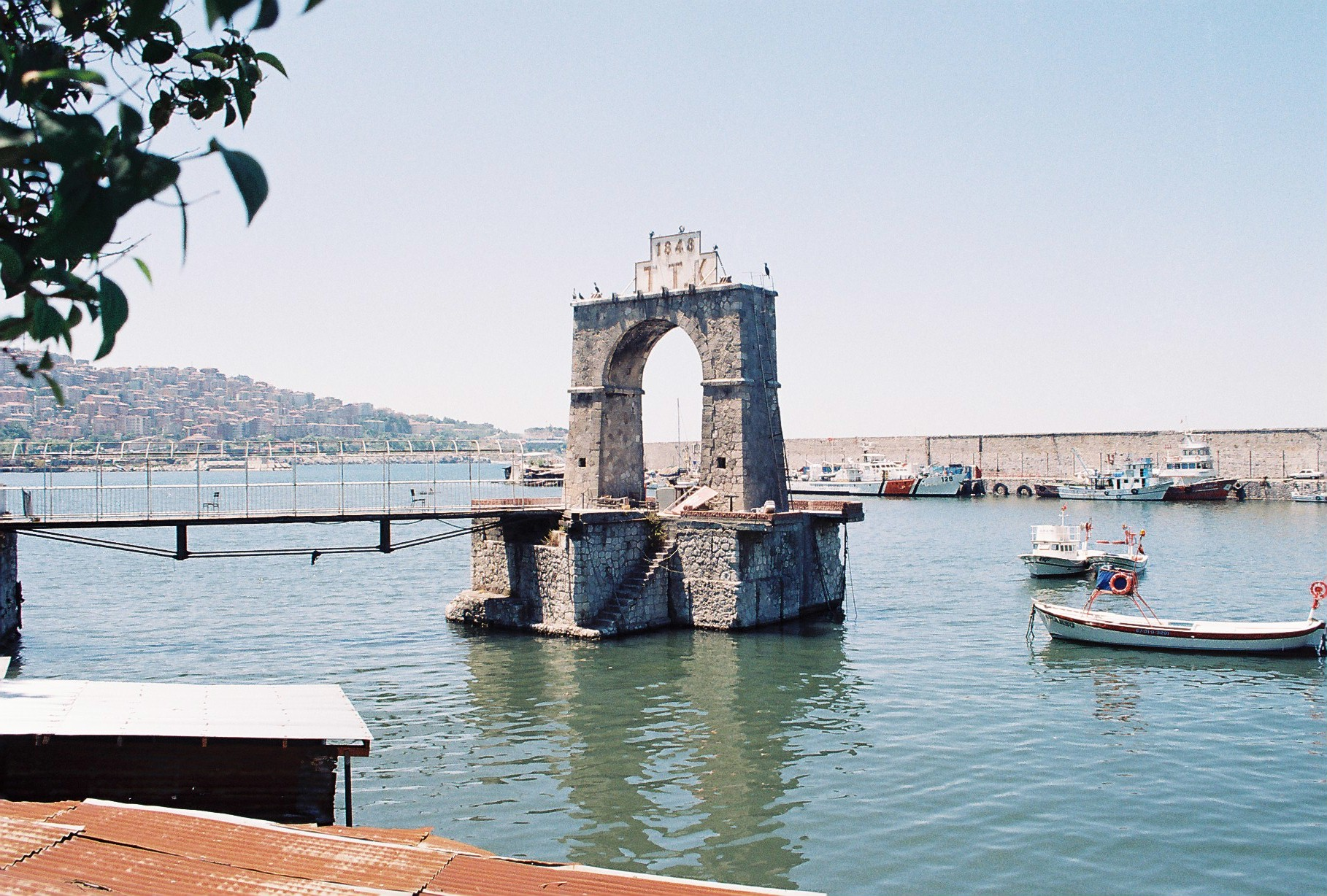
Wharf that formerly shipped coal out of Zonguldak

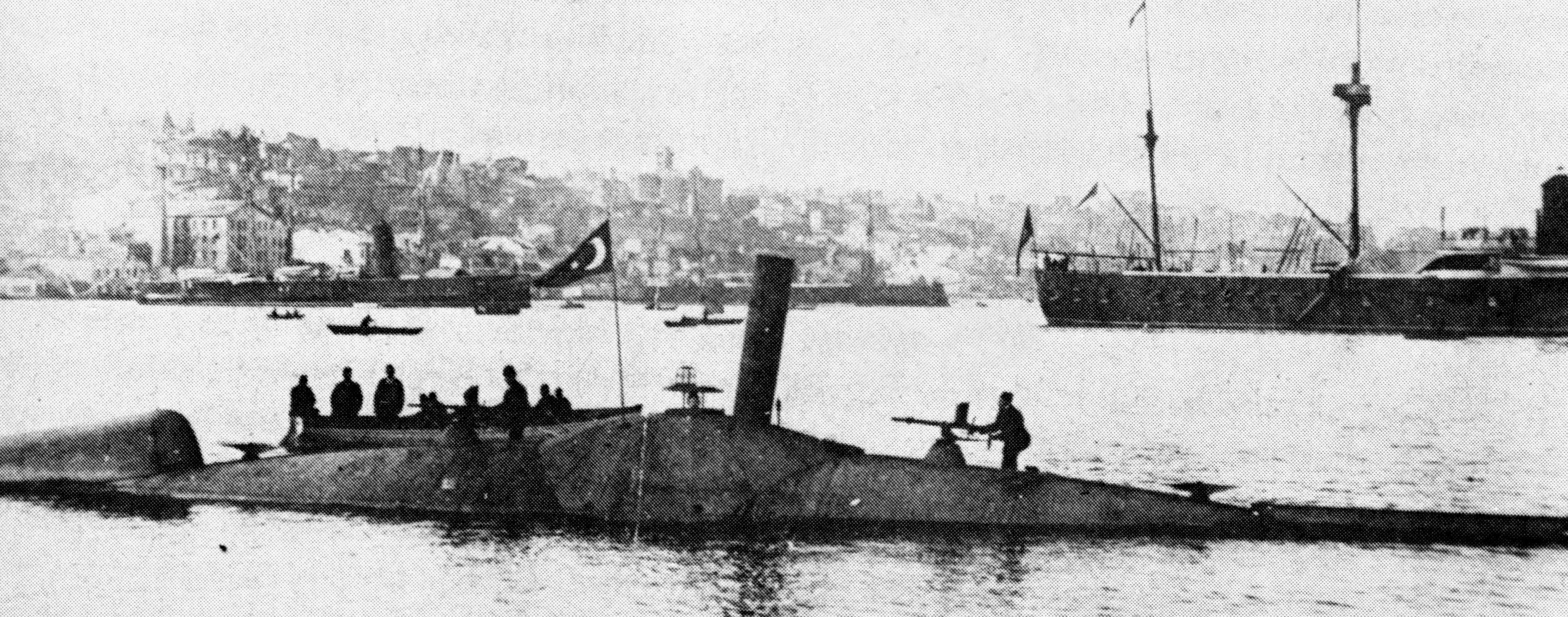
Coal-fired Ottoman submarine Abdül Hamid, built in 1886, was the first submarine in history to fire a torpedo while submerged.

=== Mining and industry ===
As the Ottoman Navy expanded its steam powered fleet in the 1840s to help defend the Ottoman Empire against the expanding Russian Empire, it became a national priority to find domestic coalfields. There are several apocryphal stories about the discovery of coal on the Black Sea coast in what is now Zonguldak Province. However, it is certain that the Ereğli Coal Mine Company started production in 1842 and that coal mined in Ereğli and Amasra was used to fuel steamboats.

In 1848 the Ereğli Coal Basin (now called the Zonguldak Basin) was mapped and claimed by Sultan Abdulmejid I, who later leased it, mainly to foreign merchants. The first customer of Turkey's coal industry was the Ottoman Navy. However, during the Crimean War in the mid-1850s, production was commandeered by the Ottoman Empire's allies, the British Royal Navy, and production increased by importing mining machinery and training Turkish miners. By 1875 the Ottoman Navy had become the third largest in the world and expansion of the mines attracted workers from outside the area, despite the dangerous conditions.

The mines in Zonguldak were shelled by Russia during World War I (WW1) to disrupt coal supply to Ottoman and German ships. The first coal-fired power station in Turkey, Silahtarağa Power Station (now SantralIstanbul culture center) opened in 1914, and after the destruction of the empire in WW1, and the subsequent Turkish War of Independence, the new Republic of Turkey industrialized further as part of Atatürk's reforms. Işıkveren in Zonguldak in 1948 was the second coal power station. Lignite from Soma supplied the army in WW1 and lignite mining began at several other coalfields in 1927. The Zonguldak coalfield remains the only national source of the hard coal (Note: The Energy Ministry defines "hard coal" as "bituminous coal". Total organic carbon of Turkish coal is up to 72.5%, whereas anthracite has over 86%. Therefore Turkey has no anthracite and the use of the phrase "hard coal" for coal mined in Turkey does not mean anthracite.) which was historically necessary for steelmaking: its mines were nationalized in 1940. In the mid-20th century the state encouraged the growth of cement and steelmaking in Zonguldak. The first large coal-fired power stations were built in the late 1950s in two large lignite basins, Soma and Tuncbilek, and in the late 20th century many power stations were constructed near lignite fields such as Elbistan coalfield. There were miner’s strikes in Zonguldak in 1965 and 1990.

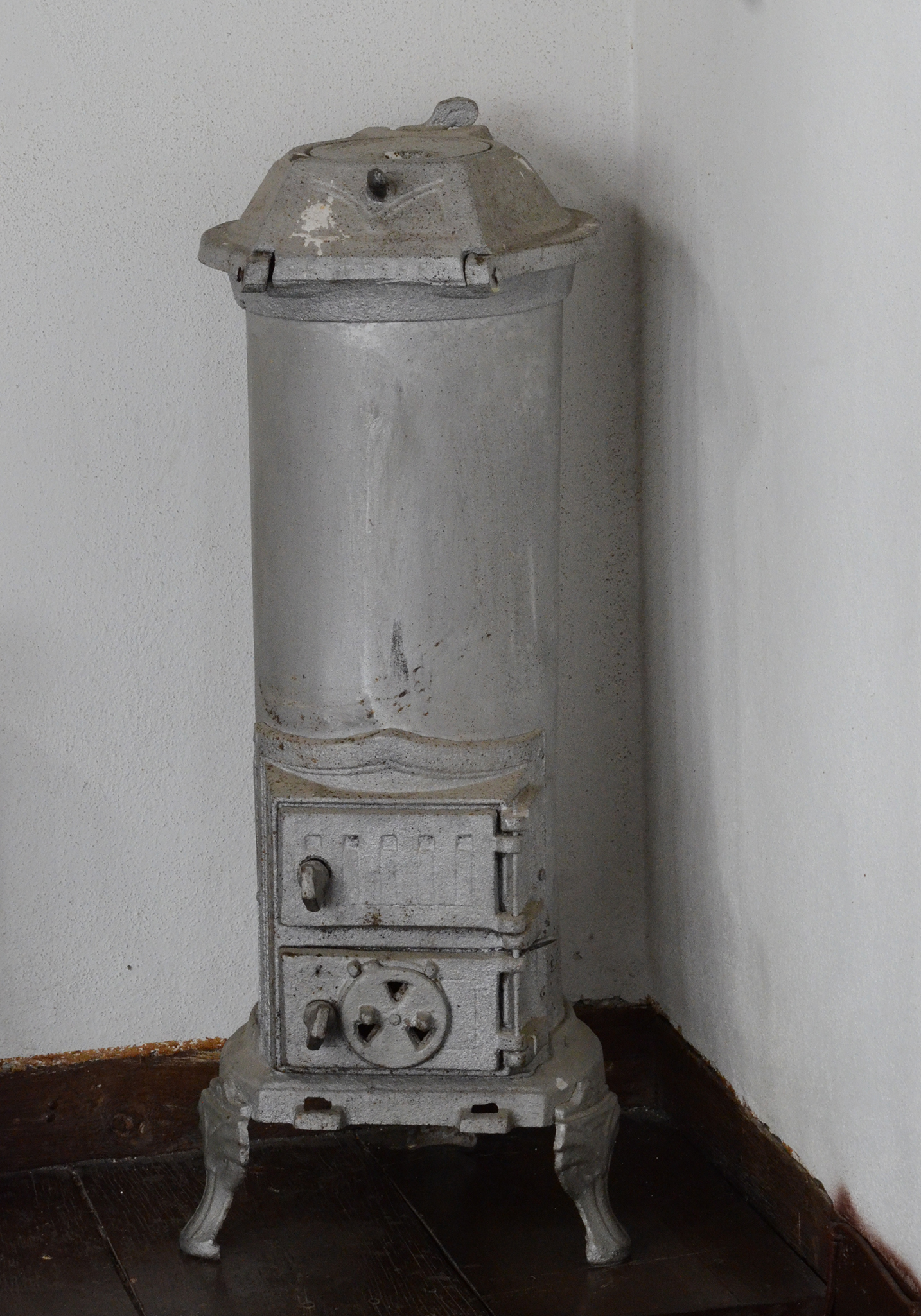
Antique coke stove exhibited in Arıkan House, Kozan

In the early 21st century there was a growing realization of the damage done by coal to public health. However, the Turkish government wished to avoid importing too much natural gas, which is a large part of the import bill, with supply dominated by Russia. The nascent environmental movement in Turkey was unable to prevent many more coal-fired power stations being built, but did stop some. After years of struggle by environmentalists standards, such as for flue-gas desulfurization, were finally improved at the end of the 2010s. As for steelmaking, most plants are now electric arc furnaces.

=== Residential heating and cooking ===
Starting in the 19th century, stoves took the place of wood burning ovens in traditional Anatolian houses. For heating, every room had a stove with a stovepipe or chimney. After the late 1970s, coke was reserved for use in institutions such as schools, and the more polluting but cheaper coal was supplied to households. Imports of natural gas started in the late 1980s and by the 2020s the pipeline distribution network had been extended to over 80% of the population. However, due to energy poverty, some of those people still use coal and the resulting air pollution causes illness and premature deaths. Most buildings constructed since the late 20th century have gas heating, not coal.

In the 2020s, in some provinces coal is still used for heating including public buildings, especially in rural areas, and even occasionally for cooking, although electricity and bottled gas are available everywhere. In 2019 TKI gave one and a half million tonnes of free coal (mostly from Alpagut Dodurga coal mine) to households with an average per person income less than one third of the minimum wage (less than 700 lira in 2020), even in neighborhoods which have piped gas. In winter 22/23 TKI distributed coal to schools and other educational institutions: this coal has to meet certain indoor heating air pollution limits. Indoor concentration of particulates is highest in the winter. Over three quarters of carbon monoxide deaths are due to stoves: almost 200 in 2017 mostly in poorer rural areas.

== Coalfields and mines ==
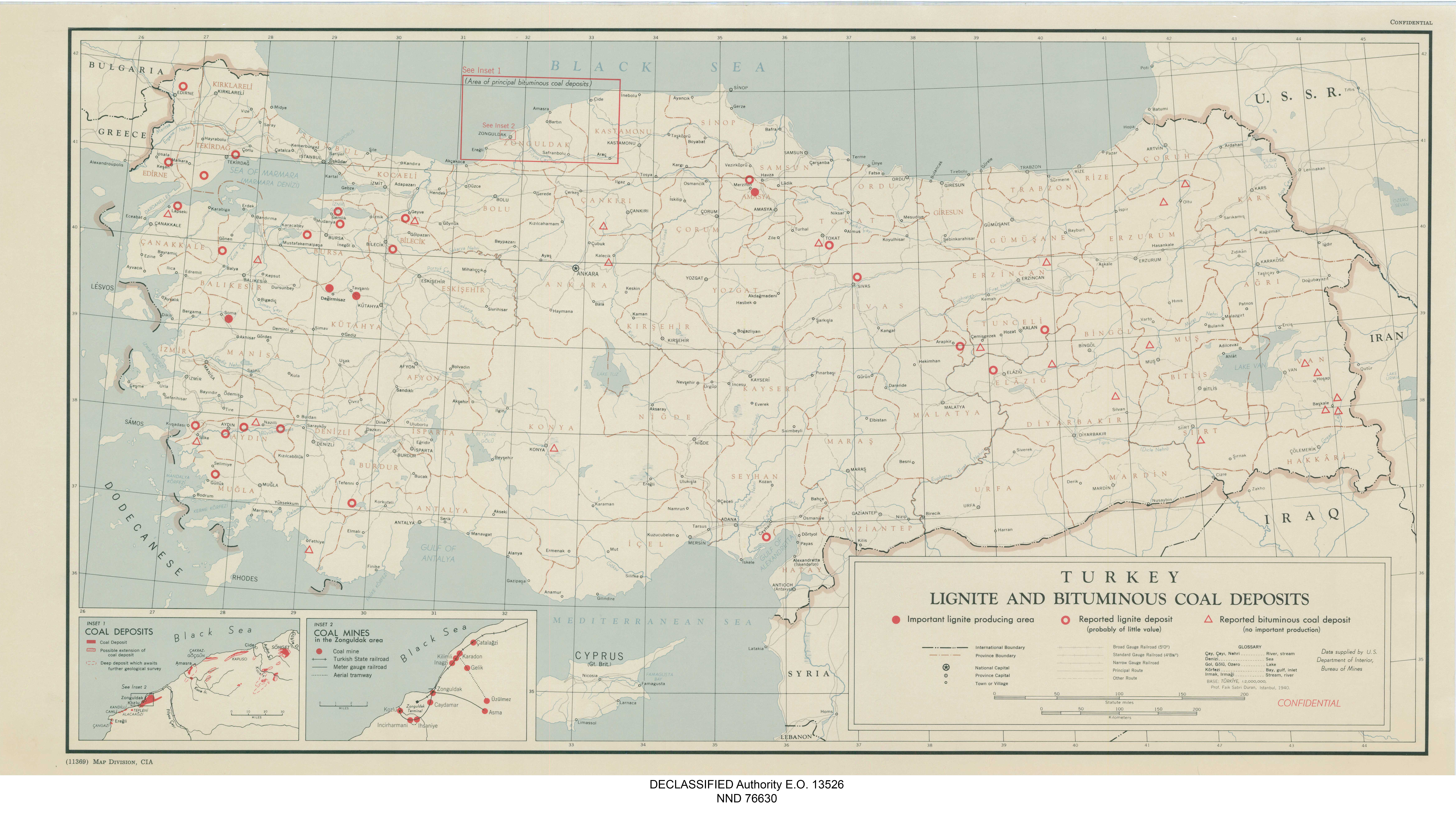
Map of coal deposits in Turkey, 1940

As of 2017 Turkey was 11th in the list of countries by coal production, and mined 1.3% of the world's coal, with lignite and sub-bituminous deposits widespread throughout the country. Due to the country's geology, there is no hard coal, which has a higher energy density (over 7,250 kcal/kg), within 1000 m of the surface. All coal deposits are owned by the state but over half of mining is done by the private sector. In 2017 almost half of Turkey's coal production was mined by the state-owned mines, but the government is seeking an expansion of privatization. As of 2019, there are 436 coal mining companies such as Akçelik, 740 coal mines, and more mining and exploration licences are being tendered. However, some drilling companies are not bidding for licences because mineral exploration is more profitable and in 2018 many mining licences were combined with coal licenses. Mining is documented in the "e-maden" computer system ("maden" means "mine" in Turkish). Coal miners do not have the right to strike. A company called Tarhan Maden has proposed a mine in the district of Tavşanlı in Kütahya Province. Unions have complained of mines they say are unsafe, such as Kınık coal mine. In July 2025 the government proposed that mining companies would not have to wait for EIA approval from the ministry.

=== Hard coal ===
The Zonguldak basin in the northwest is the only coal mining region in Turkey that produces hard coal: about 2 million tons a year from mines including Kandilli, Amasra, Karadon, Kozlu and Üzülmez. Compared to other countries, the energy value of the coal is low, at 6,200 kilocalories per kilogram (2,800 kcal/lb) to 7,250 kcal/kg (3,290 kcal/lb). Up to 72.5% is organic carbon. 10 to 15% is coal ash, 4 to 14% moisture, and 0.8 to 1% sulfur. Although low grade it is generally of cokeable or semi-cokeable quality. Because there is so much faulting and folding, mining in the region is very difficult. Long-wall mining is necessary due to the tectonic structure of the seams.

=== Lignite ===
Turkey is one of the countries which mines the most lignite. The most significant deposits of lignite were laid down in the geological Neogene period. Almost half of the country's lignite reserves are in the Afşin–Elbistan basin. Lignite coalfields include Elbistan, Kutahya Tavsanlı, Inez, Manisa, İnağzı-Bağlık and Gediz, and 90% of lignite production is from surface mines. Locations of major individual lignite mines include Tunçbilek in Tavşanlı, Yatağan near the southern Aegean Sea, Yeniköy in Muğla and Seyitömer in Kütahya; and there is a gilsonite mine in Silopi. Turkish lignite has high carbon, (Note: The net calorific value of Turkish lignite is lower than that of typical lignite, varying by power station; its average is about 2,800) sulphur, ash, moisture and volatile components. Its calorific value is less than 12.5 MJ/kg – and that from Afsin Elbistan has less than 5 MJ/kg, which is a quarter of typical thermal coal. Opencast mining of lignite can destroy forest land, as although soil must be stored by law, it can degrade before reforestation. In 2023 a proposed rule allowing removal of olive trees was retracted.

=== Mining technology ===
Exploration and research is done by the General Directorate of Mineral Research and Exploration. In the 2010s coal mining technology from China was imported. But according to energy analyst Haluk Direskeneli coal power plant technology which has been imported is unsuitable for Turkish coal, so refractory distortions are occurring, and control systems and other equipment is failing. He says that circulating fluidized bed (CFB) technology is unsuitable because Turkish lignite does not burn continuously in the CFB combustion chamber without supplementary liquid fuel. In Direskeneli's opinion "local coal enters the combustion chamber as ice in winter and as mud in summer", so the water content of domestic coal should be reduced by preheating.

As of 2018, environmental regulations for coal mines still lag behind international standards despite improvements. As of 2019 an expansion of coal washing capacity was planned together with research on coal pollution mitigation and lignite gasification. According to the Eleventh Development Plan (2019-2023): "In order to reduce the import dependence and current accounts deficit in energy, exploration, generation and R & D activities will be increased for high potential domestic resources such as geothermal and shale gas, especially lignite."

== Health and safety ==
The Istanbul Policy Center estimates that every year in Turkey, the mining and burning of coal causes at least 2,800 premature deaths, 637,000 working days to be lost, and 3.6 billion euros in additional costs. Although there are some concerns about ground (Note: Fly ash, a byproduct of the coal refining process, is often sold to cement factories as a raw material. Concentrations of natural radionuclides vary depending on the power station and the product may be safe in building materials depending on the amount used.) and water pollution, most coal-related deaths are caused by worsening air pollution in Turkey.

=== Workers' health and safety ===
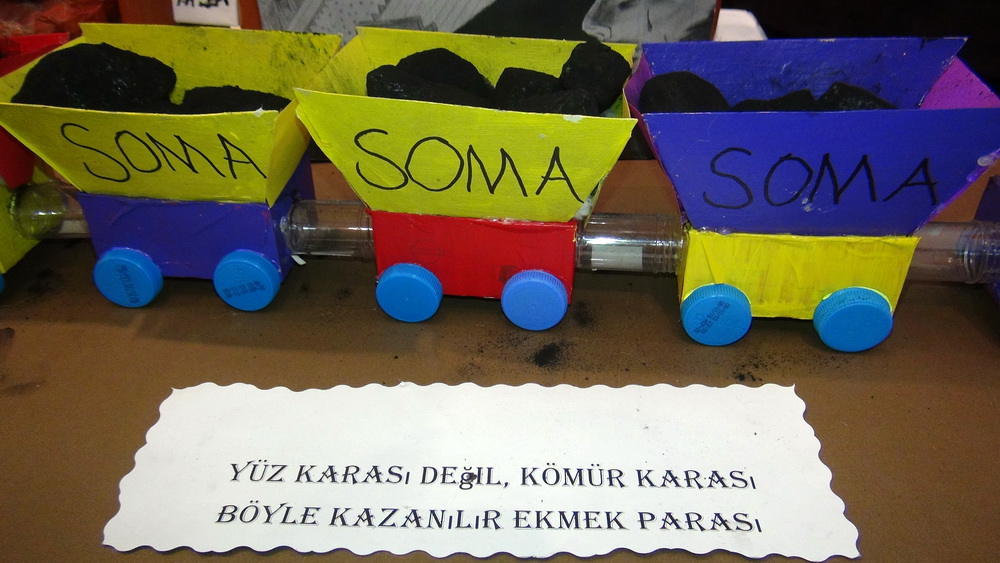
Children's models commemorating the Soma mine disaster - "This is how they earn their daily bread"

Accidents which killed over 100 people include that at Armutçuk coal mine in the 1980s. After the deaths of over 300 people in the Soma mine disaster in 2014, new health and safety regulations were introduced. As of 2018, most mining accidents happen in coal mines but the reasons for Turkey's poor mining safety are not entirely clear. According to a 2022 study the small number of workers in trade unions and the widespread use of subcontractors contribute to poor working conditions.

Most underground coal-mining deaths are caused by methane explosions and other gas-related accidents, as is suspected was the cause of the Bartın mine explosion which killed 41 people in 2022. The government has restricted access to workplace accident statistics, but coal mining is thought to be the most accident-prone sector of the economy. As of 2018 coal mining fatalities continue to occur in illegal mines. Coal miners suffer respiratory diseases such as black lung, chronic obstructive pulmonary disease, back pain, periodontal disease and other illnesses; and increased risk from respiratory infections such as COVID-19.

According to Bianet newspaper some workers have been dismissed for joining the Independent Mine Workers' Union (Bağımsız Maden İş).

=== Air pollution ===
Coal contributes to air pollution in big cities. The Organisation for Economic Co-operation and Development (OECD) says that residential heating is emitting dangerous levels of fine particulates: so it recommends reducing particulate emissions by not using coal. There is a pollutant release and transfer register, but as of September 2024 no years are publicly searchable because it is not yet technically complete, and it is not known what exemptions will be granted.(see FAQ). As of 2024 Turkey has not joined 2 international agreements to reduce SOx emissions.

== Environment ==
The environmental impact of the coal industry is both local and international. In 2024 burning solid fossil fuel emitted 167 Mt CO2, almost all from coking coal (92 Mt) and lignite (71 Mt). Methane leaks from coal mines in 2024 were equivalent to 7 Mt CO_{2}.

Turkey has become Europe's largest producer of coal-fired electricity, with fossil fuels accounting for over half of its total electricity generation. While the government has recently shelved some planned coal projects in favor of rapid wind and solar expansion, domestic lignite and imported coal remain central pillars of its national energy security strategy. However, the country has set a net-zero target by 2053. To support that effort, it said it will add 7.5–8 gigawatts of solar and wind capacity annually through 2035. Turkey will host COP31 in the fall of 2026.

=== Mine site remediation ===
Acid mine drainage from coal refuse varies considerably and in some areas remediation of the mine sites is needed.

Coal refuse may be processed and burnt.

== Consumption ==
100 million tonnes(mt) of coal was burned in 2023. 46 mt of lignite and asphaltite was used to generate electricity by coal-fired power stations in Turkey, 6 mt by other industry, and 5 mt for heating buildings. 25 mt of hard coal was used to generate electricity, 6 mt in coke plants, 1 mt iron-steel, 4 mt other industry, and 3 mt for heating.

Lignite fired power stations did not become more productive between 2009 and 2018, but three-quarters by weight of coal burnt in Turkish power stations is lignite. Demand and price of coal increased in 2022 due to the European energy crisis. In 2022 14% of household final energy was coal.

=== Electricity generation ===
Coal generated a third of the nation's electricity in 2023. There are 55 active coal-fired power stations with a total capacity of 21 gigawatts (GW). (Note: EMRA totals 15 + 22 + 15 = 52 coal power licences - but as ZETES 1 2 and 3 have the same licence if counted as separate power stations the total would be 54, which almost matches the total on the Turkish version of the Wikipedia list.) In 2023 coal imports for electricity generation cost US$3.7 billion.

Air pollution from coal-fired power stations is damaging public health, and it is estimated that a coal phase-out by 2030 instead of by the 2050s would save over 100,000 lives. Flue gas emission limits were improved in 2020, but data from mandatory reporting of emission levels is not made public. Turkey has not ratified the Gothenburg Protocol, which limits fine dust polluting other countries. As of 2023 official health impact assessment is not done in Turkey.

Turkey's coal is almost all low calorie lignite, but government policy supports its continued use. In contrast, Germany is closing lignite-fired stations under 150 MW. Drought in Turkey is frequent, but thermal power stations use significant amounts of water.

Coal-fired power stations are the largest source of greenhouse gas, at about a tonne each year per person, which is about the world average. Coal-fired stations emit over 1 kg of carbon dioxide for every kilowatt hour generated, over twice that of gas power. Academics suggest that in order to reach Turkey's target of carbon neutrality by 2053, coal power should be phased out by the mid-2030s. In January 2023 the National Energy Plan was published: it forecast a capacity increase to 24.3 GW by 2035, including 1.7 GW more by 2030. However, by 2024 it was obvious that no new coal power stations would be built, although Çelikler Holding still want to add units to Afşin Elbistan A, and Tufanbeyli management want to expand it, which are the only proposals for new unabated coal power in the OECD. The national plan forecasts coal generation decreasing but capacity payments continuing for flexible and baseload power, with coal power subsidies in the 4 years to 2030 estimated at $8.7 billion. Turkey is Europe's top coal polluter outside Russia.

=== Iron ===
Coal is used in making pig iron, companies such as Kardemir and İsdemir use coal, and Erdemir washes coal and operates blast furnaces.

== Subsidies ==
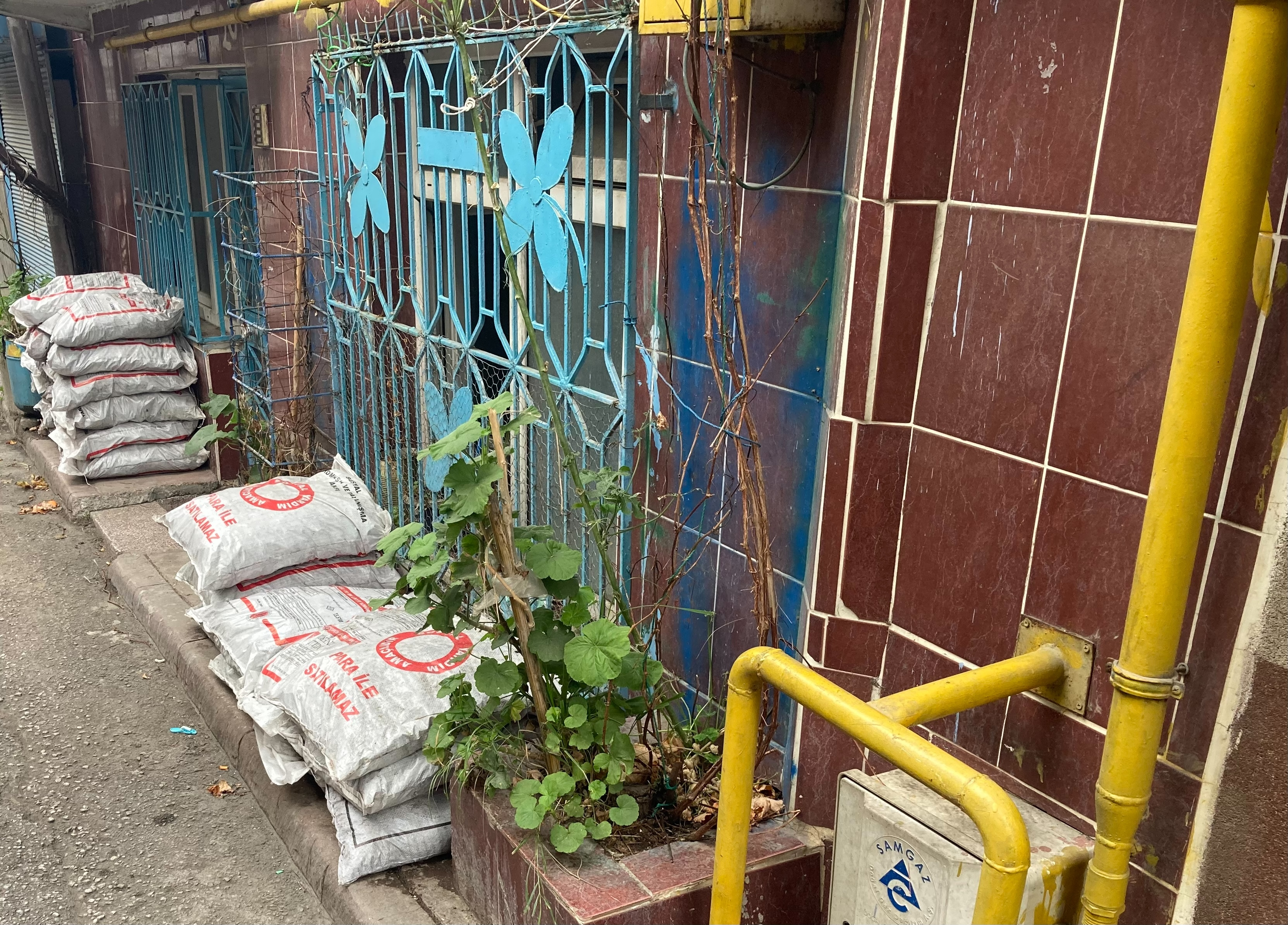
Free coal delivered to a poor household in Samsun in 2024

As a signatory of the Convention on Biological Diversity (Aichi Target 3), Turkey committed to phasing out environmentally harmful subsidies, including those to fossil fuels, by 2020. However, coal remained the most subsidized source of electricity in Turkey. Lignite-fired power stations receive multiple subsidies for construction (Note: Lignite is in group 4-b of Article 2 of Mining Law No. 3213 thus lignite-fired power plants can receive region 5 subsidies regardless of their actual location in Turkey.) and operation. Specific subsidy programs include value-added tax waivers, offsetting investment costs and tax reductions. There is a guaranteed purchase price per MWh.

Turkey's government support to coal and coal-fired power production and consumption ₺ millions, 2016–2017 annual average
Instrument	Coal production	Coal-fired power	Coal consumption
Fiscal support (budgetary transfers and tax exemptions)	947	31	1,287
State-owned enterprise investment	198	953	none identified

The Turkey Wealth Fund continued supporting coal into the 2020s. The price of electricity generated from domestic coal is adjusted according to the consumer price index, the producer price index and the dollar exchange rate, and paid by the state-owned electricity company to private-sector power plants. In 2024 the government allocated over 2 billion lira (equivalent to US$64 million) to the Turkish Coal Operations Authority, which mines lignite. However from the mid-2020s the state no longer guaranteed to buy coal mined.

== Companies ==
Between 2008 and 2018, the coal industry was partially privatized; nevertheless state-owned companies mined over half of the total amount of Turkish coal in 2018. Turkish Coal Operations Authority (TKİ) owns lignite mines, and Turkish Hard Coal Enterprises (TTK) owns hard coal mines.

Several companies have acquired mining rights for hard coal fields: Erdemir Madencilik, a subsidiary of Turkey's autonomous military pension program; Oyak; Tumas, a subsidiary of Bereket Holding, and energy company Emsa Enerji. In 2019 private companies paid over 20 million lira royalties to TTK. Lignite fields have been transferred to Imbat Madencilik (which is on the GCEL), Fernas Holding, Demir Export and construction group Yapi Tek. Eren Holding holds the largest amount of coal-fired generation capacity, 2,790 megawatts, at the ZETES power complex in Zonguldak. Several companies hold more than a gigawatt of coal power capacity: IC Içtaş Enerji, the state-owned EÜAŞ; Konya Şeker, a company owned by Anadolu Birlik Holding; ERG Elektrik; Diler Holding; Çelikler Holding and Ciner Holding. Akçelik also mines opencast and is on the Global Coal Exit List. However, mining licence information that is held by the government in the "e-maden" database is not released to the public.

In the late 2010s, the government attempted to auction mine licenses to private companies provided that they would build nearby power plants, but the auctions attracted little interest as the currency weakened. And although lignite is more polluting than most other types of coal, the government tried to persuade other coal-fired power stations to convert to lignite to reduce import costs. The 2018 Turkish currency crisis and COVID-19 recession increased costs for mining companies and increased the difficulty of obtaining bank credits, threatening the coal industry. Traders include Elgin Emtia, which together with other companies is on the Global Coal Exit List compiled by the NGO Urgewald.

=== International investments ===
Turkish company Yılmaden has acquired coal mining rights in Colombia. Chinese state owned enterprises and companies which invested in coal power projects include Shanghai Electric Power, which is the main investor in Emba Hunutlu power station in Adana Province.

== Imports ==
Much of the rise in consumption in the 21st century was due to the construction of coastal power stations burning imported hard coal.

Imported coal generates about a quarter of the nation's electricity. 24 million tonnes of coal were imported in 2023. 70% of thermal coal imports are from Russia, because the price is discounted. A customs union deal with the EU includes bilateral trade concessions on coal.

About half of metallurgical coal imports are from Australia and most of the rest from the US, with small amounts from Russia and Colombia. The main ports for import of met coal are Eregli, Zonguldak and Iskenderun. As of 2018 if the import price of thermal coal is less than 70 US$/tonne (fob) the state charges the difference as import duty. In 2020 coking coal cost around US$130/tonne. Anthracite coal from Donbas, a region in Ukraine, is exported (allegedly illegally) to Turkey. The anthracite is transported through the Russian ports of Azov and Taganrog to the Turkish city of Samsun. Some analysts say that coal which was formerly exported to the EU but is now sanctioned is instead being bought by Turkey, and that as of end-2022 Turkey is the largest buyer of Russian coal. In 2026 a Turkish ship importing coal from Taman Port was attacked by drone.

== Politics ==
According to a 2022 study the Presidency of Strategy and Budget and the Turkey Wealth Fund have the most influence on coal policy and investment decisions, but some say that the wealth fund lacks public scrutiny. The study concluded that increasing energy security and thus national security by limiting imports was the main energy policy aim. Increasing coal power was part of the 2022 national energy plan, but the private sector will not invest in it without substantial government support. According to Ümit Şahin, who teaches climate change at Sabancı University, Turkey is not facing up to the reality that most coal will have to be left in the ground and risks losing access to international climate finance if the country does not quickly schedule an exit from coal.

Many local communities strongly oppose coal power stations and mines, sometimes taking legal action against them. From the late 2000s, residents of Amasra strongly fought against the establishment of a coal-fired power station near the city; it was cancelled. In Alpu district, locals of the region won a court battle in 2018 to prevent the building of a new coal mine; the 14th chamber of the Council of State ruled that the mine could only be built with an environmental report. Turkish activists have also taken their campaign to international conferences. Nevertheless, in 2019 only 36 of the 600 members of parliament voted to reduce power plant emission limits. In 2021 inhabitant of İkizköy village continue to protest and filed a lawsuit: they claim that a permit to cut down Akbelen Forest to expand a lignite mine should not have been granted without an environmental impact assessment. The company (part owned by Limak Holding) says that Akbelen was allocated to the coal mine when the Kemerköy and Yeniköy power plants were built, and that the General Directorate of Forestry defined it as an "industrial plantation area for 2019".

The Green Party is calling for an end to coal burning, and all fossil fuel use to be phased out by 2050, but has been barred from the 2023 general election.

== Coal phase-out ==
The UN and youth activists have called for a 2030 end date, but as of 2026 there is no plan for coal phase out. The World Bank has proposed general objectives and estimated the cost, but has suggested government do far more detailed planning. Istanbul Policy Center said in 2025 that coal power could be phased out by 2036.

A 2020 study of coal-fired residential heating in Turkey's 3rd largest city İzmir estimated the cost of replacing it versus the reduction in illness and premature deaths. Five old plants (Afşin-Elbistan A, Seyitömer, Tunçbilek, Kangal and Çatalağzı) were closed in 2020 because they did not meet new pollution limits but were all restarted later in the year. The country is the world's ninth-largest consumer of coal, similar to Poland. In contrast during the early 21st century German energy from coal fell from 6x that of Turkey to below Turkey. In terms of energy resources, Spain is more similar, having hydropower and abundant sunshine, and its transition away from coal could also be a model. Turkish industry has experience converting coal to solar outside the country. Companies which get much of their revenue from coal (such as Elgin Emtia and İmbat with over 90%) are on the Urgewald Global Coal Exit List.

=== Employment ===
Historically some agricultural workers moved to coal with the expropriation of agricultural land for the coal industry. Although only 0.3% of workers are coal miners it is very important for some small isolated communities: middle-aged miners in Soma are particularly vulnerable. In 2019, the minimum wage for coal miners was twice the standard minimum wage.

Due to the complex geology of the Zonguldak basin, hard coal production in Turkey is insignificant, heavily subsidised and labour-intensive. However Zonguldak Province is highly dependent on coal. By 2021 the number of people working in hard coal mines in Zonguldak had dropped to 7,000: many people of working age had moved to Istanbul, and the population had decreased, leaving more pensioners than working people in the province. Despite this, as of 2026, Turkey had not implemented a just transition policy, although the government spoke in favor of it in 2015 and it is supported by the European Bank for Reconstruction and Development and environmental organisations such as Greenpeace.

== See also ==
- Environmental issues in Turkey
- Climate change in Turkey
- Glossary of coal mining terminology

== Sources ==
- Doukas, Alex; Gençsü, Ipek (June 2019). Turkey: G20 coal subsidies (PDF). Overseas Development Institute (Report). Archived from the original (PDF) on 26 June 2019.
- Efimova, Tatiana; Mazur, Eugene; Migotto, Mauro; Rambali, Mikaela; Samson, Rachel (February 2019). OECD Environmental Performance Reviews: Turkey 2019. OECD (Report). OECD Environmental Performance Reviews. doi:10.1787/9789264309753-en. ISBN 978-92-64-30976-0.
- Ersoy, Mücella (2019). Turkish coal mining sector: Current State, Strategy for the Future (PDF) (Report). Turkish Coal Operations Authority.
- Turkey Mining (PDF) (Report). Global Business Reports. 2018.
- Öztürk, Hikmet; Katisöz, Özlem; Akça, Erhan (2019). "Desertification, Soil Organic Carbon, Erosion against Fossil Fuel Plants: The Review of Struggle of Cross-Purposes in Turkey" (PDF). In Ayten Namli; Oğuz Can Turgay; Muhittin Onur Akça (eds.). Proceedings 10th International Soil Congress. Ankara.
- Şahin, Ümit; Türkkan, Seçil (January 2019). "Turkey's Climate Policies Have Reached a Deadlock: It Takes Courage to Resolve It" (PDF). saha. Vol. Special Issue 2. pp. 24–30. ISSN 2149-7885.
