= Amasra coal mine =

Underground coal mine in Turkey

Amasra Coal Mine
- Amasra coal mine in Turkey

Location
- Location: Amasra, Bartın, Turkey; 41°43′23″N 32°21′01″E

Production
- Products: Hard coal (not anthracite)
- Production: 125,000 tons per year
- Type: underground

History
- Opened: 1967
- Active: to 2022

Owner
- Company: Turkish Hard Coal Enterprises
- Website: taskomuru.net/tr/amasra-t-i-m/

Amasra Coal Mine is a coal mine in Turkey located in Amasra, Bartın Province. It is operated by Amasra Taşkömürü İşletme Müessesesi̇, which is part of state-owned Turkish Hard Coal Enterprises (TTK). 125,000 tonnes of coal was mined in 2021, which was less than any of the other four TTK owned mines in Zonguldak coal field: Armutçuk, Kozlu, Üzülmez and Karadon.

On 14 October 2022, an explosion in the mine killed 41 people and wounded eleven.
