= Çatalağzı power station =

Coal-fired power station in Turkey

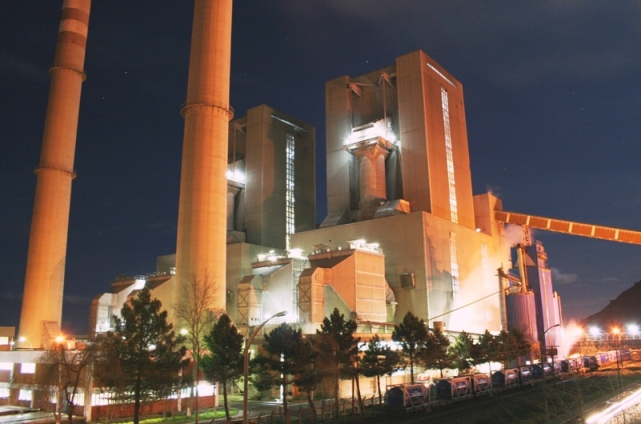
- Country: Turkey
- Coordinates: 41°31′02″N 31°54′03″E
- Status: Operational
- Commission date: 1990; 1991
- Owner: Aydem Energy

Thermal power station
- Primary fuel: Bituminous coal

Power generation
- Nameplate capacity: 315 MW
- Annual net output: 1,219 GWh (2021); 1,233 GWh (2020); 1,494 GWh (2019); 1,765 GWh (2022)

External links
- Website: www.cates.com.tr

Çatalağzı power station (ÇATES) is a coal-fired power station in Turkey. Its two units opened in 1990 and 1991, and it was privatised in 2014. The plant was shut down for not meeting new air pollution regulations for coal in Turkey in January 2020, but was granted a one-year temporary operating licence by the Turkish Environment Ministry in June.

== History ==
The first long-distance transmission line was from Zonguldak to Istanbul in 1952.

Çatalağzı power station is located on a 100-hectare (250-acre) site three km (1.9 mi) from Çatalağzi and 17 km (11 mi) from Zonguldak. The plant was put in the 1974 investment plan to meet national electricity demand and to make use of some of the leftovers of coal preparation in the Zonguldak basin. As well as being close to the mines, other criteria were the availability of an ash and slag disposal site, the water needed by the power plant, proximity to the electricity consumption centers, and being far from earthquake faults.

Following the original 1948 ÇATES-A which retired in 1988, unit 1 of the plant then known as ÇATES-B was started in 1990 and unit 2 in 1991. The plant was privatised in 2014, it is the largest power station supplied by Turkish Hard Coal Enterprises.

Following debt restructuring in 2019, the owner, Bereket Energy, was renamed Aydem Energy.

== Heath impact ==
The plant was shut down for not meeting new air pollution regulations for coal in Turkey in January 2020. In May 2020 Greenpeace applied to the Health Ministry to request the plant remain closed, saying that the country's air pollution increased the risks of the COVID-19 pandemic in Turkey. In June 2020 the Environment Ministry said that the plant had been made compliant with the legislation, gave it a one-year temporary licence and the plant restarted. In July 2020 the Right to Clean Air Platform complained that it was still emitting thick smoke.

It is estimated that closing the plant by 2030, instead of when its licence ends in 2063, would prevent over 1000 premature deaths.

== Operation ==
The two units consume on average 5,500 tonnes (5,400 long tons; 6,100 short tons) of coal.

Aydem received 36 million lira (about US$5 million) in capacity payments for 2020.
