= Bakacakkadı =

- Municipality
- Location in Turkey
- Coordinates: 41°20′N 32°06′E
- Country: Turkey
- Province: Zonguldak
- District: Gökçebey
- Elevation: 160 m (520 ft)
- Population (2022): 3,196
- Time zone: UTC+3 (TRT)
- Postal code: 67670
- Area code: 0372

Bakacakkadı is a town (belde) in the Gökçebey District, Zonguldak Province, Turkey. Its population is 3,196 (2022). Bakacakkadı is situated to the east of Turkish state highway D.750 which runs from Black Sea coast to Mediterranean Region. A recreation and cultural center established in 1981 to celebrate Atatürk's 100. birth year and named Atatürk 100.yıl Hizmet köyü is situated 2.5 kilometres (1.6 mi) north west of the town. The distance to Gökçebey is 5 kilometres (3.1 mi) and to Zonguldak is 35 kilometres (22 mi).

The word kadı in the name of the town suggests that Bakacakkadı was a temporary office of a touring kadı during the Ottoman Empire era In 1992, Bakacakkadı was declared a seat of township. Formerly the town economy depended on coal mines. In the early twentyfirst century greenhouse agriculture superseded the mining economy.
