= Eynez coal mine =

Coal mine in Turkey

Eynez Coal Mine
- Eynez coal mine in Turkey
- Location: Manisa Province, Turkey; 39°4′37.90″N 27°31′30.93″E
- Products: hard lignite

Eynez Coal Mine, also known as Soma Coal Mine, is a longwall underground coal mine in Turkey near the town of Soma in Manisa Province. The mine, a public property owned by TKI, was operated by the private sector company Soma Kömür İşletmeleri A.Ş. In May 2014 the Soma mine disaster took place in the mine, killing 301 people. In 2018 TKI retendered the operating licence.

Eynez 1 and 2 mines are now operated by Demir Export, a subsidiary of Koç Holding. Demir Export is on the Urgewald Global Coal Exit List.
