= Erdemir (disambiguation) =

Erdemir is a Turkish steel producer.

Erdemir may also refer to:

- Erdemir SK, a basketball club based in Zonguldak, Turkey
- Port of Erdemir, a port in the western Black Sea

== People with the surname ==
- Ali Erdemir, Turkish scientist
