= Hacımusa, Gökçebey =

Hacımusa
- Village
- Location within Turkey
- Coordinates: 41°19′03″N 32°15′27″E
- Country: Turkey
- Province: Zonguldak
- District: Gökçebey
- Population (2022): 901
- Time zone: UTC+3 (TRT)

Hacımusa is a village in Gökçebey District, Zonguldak Province, Turkey. Its population is 901 (2022). Before the 2013 reorganisation, it was a town (belde). Its distance to Gökçebey is about 12 km (7.5 mi).
