= Kilimli =

- Municipality
- Location within Turkey
- Coordinates: 41°29′N 31°50′E
- Country: Turkey
- Province: Zonguldak
- District: Kilimli

Government
  - Mayor: Kamil Altun (AKP)
- Elevation: 25 m (82 ft)
- Population (2022): 19,989
- Time zone: UTC+3 (TRT)
- Postal code: 67500
- Area code: 0372
- Climate: Cfb
- Website: www.kilimli.bel.tr

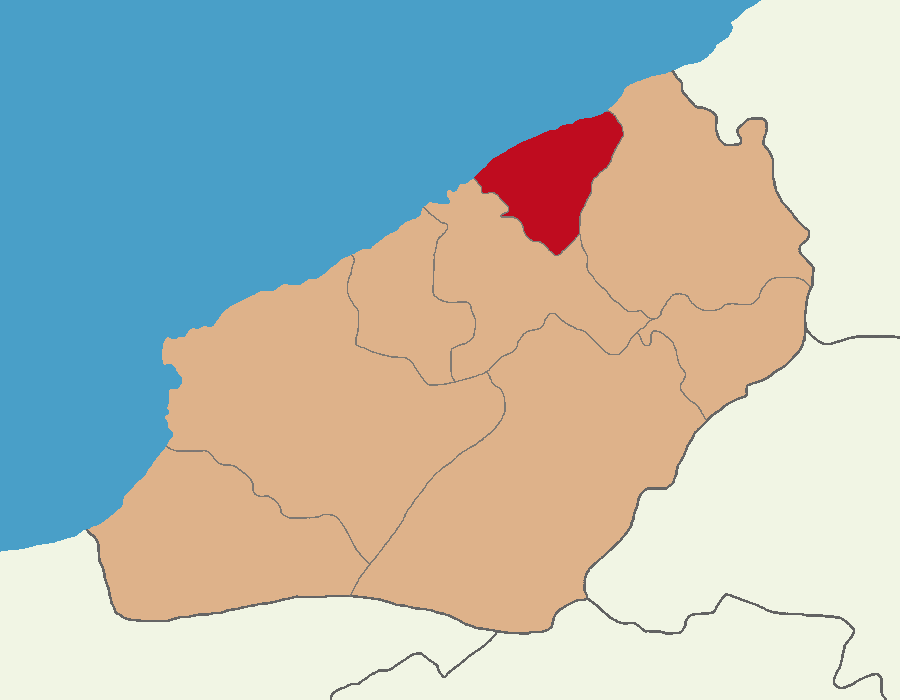
Zonguldak location Kilimli

Kilimli is a town in Zonguldak Province, Turkey. It is the seat of Kilimli District. Its population is 19,989 (2022). It is at the east end of Zonguldak, on the Black Sea shore, close to both Zonguldak and Çatalağzı, a town east of Kilimli. It is a relatively new town, founded after coal mines around Zonguldak were discovered. In 1927, the coal company of Kilimli was founded, and Kilimli flourished. In 1936, together with the other mines around Kilimli, the company was bought by the government. Presently, Kilimli is a typical mining town.
