= 2010 Zonguldak mine disaster =

The 2010 Zonguldak mine disaster occurred in Zonguldak Province, Turkey, on May 17, when 30 miners died in a firedamp explosion at the Karadon coal mine.

The mine was operated by the state-owned Turkish Coal Corporation (Türkiye Taşkömürü Kurumu, TTK). On May 20, 2010, rescuers retrieved the bodies of 28 workers; the bodies of two more were only recovered eight months later. It was the third mining disaster in Turkey in six months: 19 miners were killed in December 2009 in a methane gas explosion in Bursa Province, and in February 2010, 13 miners died after an explosion in a mine in Balıkesir Province.

According to statistics collected by the General Mine Workers Union (Genel Maden İşçileri Sendikası) of Turkey, 25,655 accidents occurred in Turkish Coal Corporation mines during the preceding ten years (2000–2009), in which over 26,000 mine workers were injured, and 63 lost their lives. According to statistics by the Chamber of Mining Engineers (Maden Mühendisleri Odası) of Turkey, a total of 135 miners were killed in mining accidents in general in the years 2008 and 2009.

Prime Minister Erdoğan, visiting the site of Zonguldak in 2010 after the accident, declared that the "people of this region are used to incidents like this", which are "the fate [Turkish: kader] of this profession", while calling protests against the unsafe working conditions in the state mines a "provocation".

== Other mining disasters ==
Several other mining disasters have occurred in Turkey’s mines:

- 1992: A firedamp explosion killed 270 workers.
- 2008: In a mine collapse, one miner died.
- 2014: Soma mine disaster, at least 302 died and 80 injured, this was Turkey’s worst mining disaster.

== See also ==
- 2014 Soma mine disaster
- Zonguldak basin
