= Kardemir =

Turkish iron and steel producer

- Type: Anonim Şirket
- Traded as: BİST: KRDMA
- Industry: Steel
- Founded: 1937; 89 years ago
- Headquarters: Karabük, Turkey
- Products: Hot rolled round steel bars, steel beams and profiles, blooms, billets, beam blank
- Revenue: ▲$2.17 billion (2023)
- Operating income: ▲$104 million (2023)
- Net income: ▲$54 million (2023)
- Total assets: ▼$2.06 billion (2023)
- Total equity: ▲$1.27 billion (2023)
- Number of employees: 4,500+
- Website: www.kardemir.com

Kardemir is a Turkish steel producer. The name is a contraction of the Karabük Iron and Steel Works (Turkish: Karabük Demir Çelik Fabrikaları).

== History ==
Its main plant is located at Karabük in the Black Sea region of Turkey. Construction of the complex started in 1937 and finished in two years. Power plant was the first plant put into operation in 1939 and other plants became operative successionally within 2 years. Having functioned as a state-owned company for decades, Kardemir was privatized in 1995.

== Pollution ==
Kardemir burns coal in Turkey. As an integrated steelworks emissions are higher than steel produced at electric arc furnaces. They also own Karabük coal-fired power station. Climate Trace estimates the plant emitted over 3.5 million tonnes of carbon dioxide in 2022, more greenhouse gas than any other steelmaker in the country except Erdemir and İsdemir.

== Sport sponsorship ==
Kardemir is the main sponsor of Karabükspor.

== See also ==
- List of steel producers
- List of companies of Turkey
- List of active coal-fired power stations in Turkey
- Greenhouse gas emissions by Turkey
