= Ereğli coal mine =

Mine in Turkey

Ereğli Coal Mine
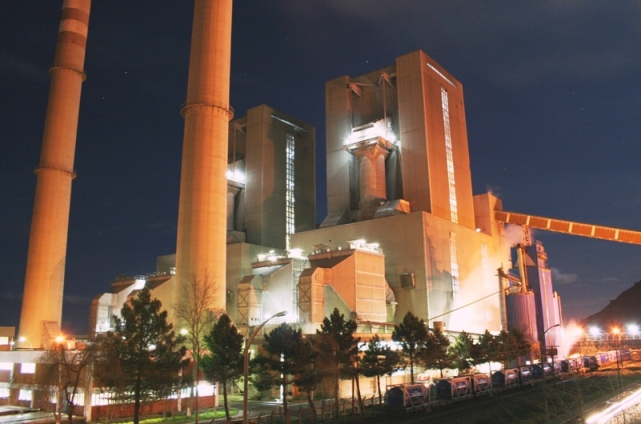
- Location: Zonguldak Province, Turkey
- Products: Lignite

Ereğli Coal Mine, in Zonguldak Province in Turkey, was created before TKİ and was one of the first coal mines of TKİ, the Turkish state mining company.
