= Türkali, Kilimli =

Türkali
- Village
- Location within Turkey
- Coordinates: 41°32′33″N 31°59′21″E
- Country: Turkey
- Province: Zonguldak
- District: Kilimli
- Population (2022): 1,087
- Time zone: UTC+3 (TRT)

Türkali is a village in Kilimli District, Zonguldak Province, Turkey. Its population is 1,087 (2022).
