= TTK =

TTK may refer to:

- Kosrae International Airport, FAA LID
- the Third Ring Road (Moscow), abbreviated ТТК in Russian
- Tiruvellore Thattai Krishnamachariar (1899–1974), an Indian politician
  - TTK Group, Indian corporate group founded by him
- TTK, the name under which TCL Technology was founded
- TTK, an abbreviation for Russian telecom company TransTelekom
- Totsuka Station, JR East station code
- Turkish Historical Association
- Turkish Hard Coal Enterprises
- TTK (gene)

ttk may refer to:

- Totoro language, ISO 639-3 code
