= Gobu =

Gobu may refer to:

- Gobu language
- Gobu Seyo, Ethiopia
- Göbü, Kilimli, Turkey
