= Şirinköy, Kilimli =

Şirinköy
- Village
- Location within Turkey
- Coordinates: 41°30′30″N 31°58′33″E
- Country: Turkey
- Province: Zonguldak
- District: Kilimli
- Population (2022): 354
- Time zone: UTC+3 (TRT)

Şirinköy is a village in Kilimli District, Zonguldak Province, Turkey. Its population is 354 (2022).
