= Kurtköy, Kilimli =

Kurtköy
- Village
- Location within Turkey
- Country: Turkey
- Province: Zonguldak
- District: Kilimli
- Population (2022): 188
- Time zone: UTC+3 (TRT)

Kurtköy is a village in Kilimli District, Zonguldak Province, Turkey at a distance of 269.5 km from Ankara.Its latitude is 40.9129 N 29.2989 E.Its postal code is 34912.. Its population is 188 (2022).
