= Port of Erdemir =

Location
- Country: Turkey
- Location: Karadeniz Ereğli
- Coordinates: 41°15′N 31°25′E
- UN/LOCODE: TRERE

Details
- Operated by: Erdemir
- Owned by: Turkish State Coal Mining
- Type of harbour: Dry
- No. of berths: 4
- No. of piers: 2

The Port of Erdemir, officially Port of Karadeniz Ereğli or shortly Er-Port (Turkish: Erdemir Limanı or Karadeniz Ereğli Limanı) is a port in the western Black Sea, located in Karadeniz Ereğli district of Zonguldak Province, Turkey, about 25 km (16 mi) from the city of Zonguldak. Owned by the Turkish State Coal Mining Co., it includes commercial operations by Turkish steel-making company Erdemir, A.Ş., as well as military facilities.

== Port facilities ==
The port consists of two older quays and two newer piers commissioned in September 1998.

The old harbour is suitable for 60,000 long tons deadweight (DWT) capacity ships with 295 m (968 ft) loading quay and 405 m (1,329 ft) coal and ore unloading quay. There are three cranes that have capacities of 1,000, 1,400 and 1,500 tons/hour on the unloading quay. On the loading quay there are four loading and unloading cranes of which one has a lifting capacity of 25 tons and the other three having a lifting capacity of 15 tons each.

The new harbour facilities include a 350 m (1,150 ft) unloading pier in 20 ft (6.1 m) water depth, capable of handling vessels up to 150,000 DWT. A second 200 m (660 ft) loading and unloading pier can handle vessels up to 70,000 DWT. Each pier has two unloading cranes with a joint capacity of 3,000 tons/hour. The unloading pier conveyor belt has a capacity of 2,500 tons/hour, and the loading /unloading pier conveyor has a capacity of 1,500 tons/hour.
