= Soma Kömür İşletmeleri A.Ş. =

Turkish coal mining company

Soma Kömür İşletmeleri
- Company type: Joint-stock company (A.Ş.)
- Industry: Mining industry
- Founded: 1984; 41 years ago
- Headquarters: Istanbul, Turkey
- Area served: Turkey
- Products: Bituminous coal, real estate development
- Owner: Soma Holding
- Number of employees: 5,500 (2014)
- Website: www.somaholding.com

Soma Kömür İşletmeleri (Soma Mining Inc.) is a Turkish coal mining company with headquarters in Istanbul, and one of the largest coal producers in the region. As of 2014, it had 5,500 employees and mined 2.5 million tons of coal annually, according to its website. It owns the mine involved in the Soma mine disaster, in which at least 301 people were killed.

The company employs 5,550 people, including 5,000 workers in underground mining operations and about 130 engineers as technical personnel.

== History ==
The company Soma Mining is part of Soma Holding, which began with mining operations in 1984. Since 2010, Soma Holding is also active in the construction business. In 2005, it took over the rights for the mining of about 18 million tonnes from the state-owned Turkish Coal Mining Corporation (Türkiye Kömür İşletmeleri Kurumu, TKİ) on royalties-based legal tender. The mining company obtained a concession from Ciner Holding in September 2009 to produce about 15 million tonnes of coal from the reserves in the Soma Eynez region. The Eynez coal mine began producing 2.5 million tonnes of coal annually.

The company's CEO, Alp Gürkan, stated in an interview with the newspaper Hürriyet in 2012 that the coal in Soma cost US$130–140 per tonne in the time when mined by TKİ, and they are committed to keep up with US$23.80 per tonne including royalties.

Towards the end of the 1970s, due to fuel shortages and difficulties importing machinery, Alp's business was brought to the point of shutting down. Alp Gürkan, having closed his company, was contemplating how to pay off his debts when a business opportunity appeared. It was as a subcontractor for a mine owned by Koç Group in Tirebolu.
