= Kilimli District =

District of Zonguldak Province, Turkey

- District
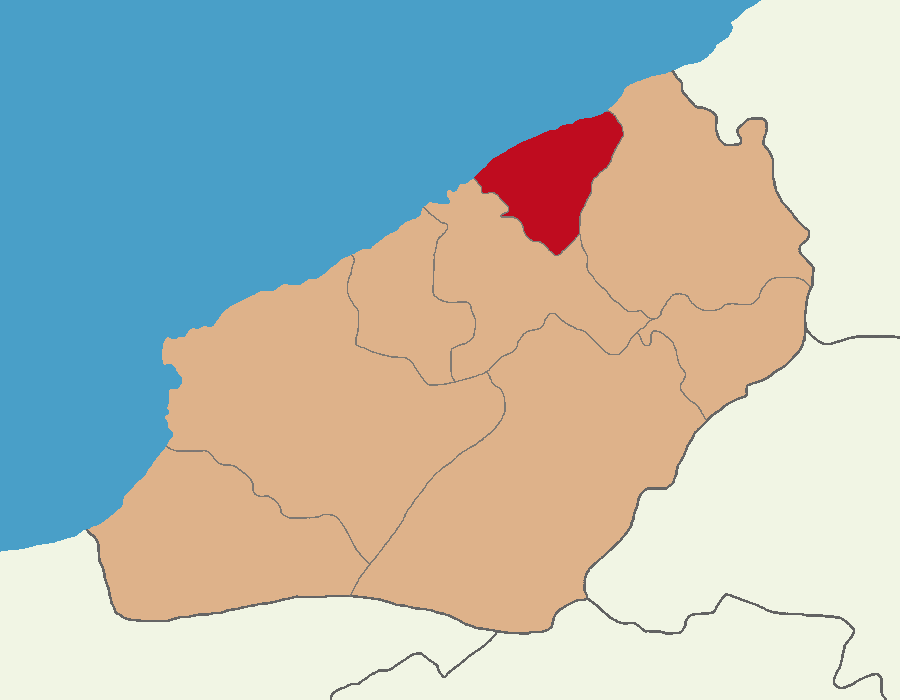
- Map showing Kilimli District in Zonguldak Province

- Location in Turkey
- Coordinates: 41°29′N 31°53′E
- Country: Turkey
- Province: Zonguldak
- Seat: Kilimli

Government
  - Kaymakam: Necdet Özdemir
- Area: 145 km^{2} (56 sq mi)
- Population (2022): 33,121
  - Density: 230/km^{2} (590/sq mi)
- Time zone: UTC+3 (TRT)
- Website: www.kilimli.gov.tr

Kilimli District is a district of the Zonguldak Province of Turkey. Its seat is the town of Kilimli. Its area is 145 km^{2}, and its population is 33,121 (2022). The district was established in 2012.

== Composition ==
There are four municipalities in Kilimli District:

- Çatalağzı
- Gelik
- Kilimli
- Muslu

There are four villages in Kilimli District:

- Göbü
- Kurtköy
- Şirinköy
- Türkali
