= Çatalağzı =

- Municipality
- Location in Turkey
- Coordinates: 41°30′N 31°52′E
- Country: Turkey
- Province: Zonguldak
- District: Kilimli
- Elevation: 40 m (130 ft)
- Population (2022): 6,379
- Time zone: UTC+3 (TRT)
- Postal code: 67150
- Area code: 0372

Çatalağzı is a town (belde) in the Kilimli District, Zonguldak Province, Turkey. Its population is 6,379 (2022).

== Geography ==
The town is about 3 km (1.9 mi) east of Kilimli and 9 km (5.6 mi) northeast of Zonguldak. The town is situated in a valley which runs parallel to Black Sea coast.

== History ==
The settlement was probably known as Psylla during the ancient times and Amastris, the daughter of Darius III of Achaemenid Empire lived around the settlement. After the Byzantine and Genoa colonial periods, the settlement was captured by the Ottoman Empire. In 1954 Çatalağzı was declared as a seat of township.

== Living ==
There are coalfields around the town and like most other settlements around, Çatalağzı is a typical mining town. In 1948, the most powerful thermal power plant of Turkey in 1940s was put into use in Çatalağzı.
