= Kardemir power station =

Coal fired power station in Turkey

- Country: Turkey
- Status: Operational
- Commission date: 1998
- Owner: Kardemir

Thermal power station
- Primary fuel: Bituminous coal
- Cogeneration?: Yes

Power generation
- Nameplate capacity: 78 MW
- Annual net output: 546 GWh (2019); 587 GWh (2020); 604 GWh (2021); 680 GWh (2022)

Kardemir power station or Karabük power station is a small coal-fired power station in Turkey (not to be confused with the gas-fired power station owned by the same company) in Karabük Province owned by Kardemir iron and steel company.
