= Armutçuk coal mine =

Armutçuk Coal Mine
Location
- Location: Zonguldak Province, Turkey

Armutçuk coal mine is located in the town of Kandilli, Ereğli District, Zonguldak Province in the Zonguldak basin of Turkey.

== History ==
- In 1983 over 100 people were killed due to firedamp.
- In 2023 an employee was killed due to a tunnel collapse.
