= Akçelik =

Turkish company

- Website: www.akcelikmadencilik.com.tr

Akçelik is a Turkish company. Akçelik Madencilik (meaning mining) is a company of Akçelik Holding. It has mined over 60 million tonnes raw coal, which is over 40 million tonnes refined coal, for comparison slightly over 100 million tonnes of coal in Turkey was mined in 2022. So it is on the Urgewald Global Coal Exit List, and according to them over half its revenue is from coal. The company has three opencast mines: Süloğlu, Malkara and Akpınar.
