= Dodurga coal mines =

Coal mines in Turkey

The Dodurga coal mines are coal mines in Turkey for lignite from the Dodurga coalfield in or near Dodurga in Çorum Province. Alpagut-Dodurga surface mine is operational and there are closed mines. Most of the coal given free to poor families across the country is from here.
