= Amasra mine explosion =

2022 mining disaster in Amasra, Turkey

- Date: 14 October 2022
- Time: 18:30 (UTC+3)
- Location: Amasra coal mine, Amasra, Bartın Province, Turkey; 41°43′23″N 32°21′01″E
- Cause: Mine explosion
- Deaths: 42
- Injuries: 27

On 14 October 2022, an explosion occurred in Amasra coal mine in Amasra, Bartın Province, Turkey, killing 42 people and injuring 27. It was one of the deadliest industrial incidents in Turkey.

== Explosion ==
The explosion occurred at 6:30 p.m. Turkish time, at a depth of about 300 metres. At the time of the incident, around 110 people were working in the mine and almost half of them were below 300 m (980 ft) deep. Some reports stated that five people were working under 350 m (1,150 ft) and 44 people were working under 300 m (980 ft).

Minister of the Interior Süleyman Soylu said that more than 22 people had died and 28 people crawled out on their own. Minister of Health Fahrettin Koca said that 11 people had been pulled out alive and were being treated in hospital. 58 miners were saved.

== Investigation ==
Amasra coal mine (Turkey)

The cause of the blast is yet unknown and is under investigation, with firedamp (possibly coalbed methane) being one suspected cause.

== Response ==
President Recep Tayyip Erdoğan wrote on Twitter that he was closely monitoring the situation and said that search and rescue operations were progressing rapidly at the mine. Erdoğan canceled a planned trip to Diyarbakır and instead traveled to Amasra on 15 October. Erdoğan's comments linking the explosion to "the plan of destiny" and saying that such explosions "will always be" drew criticism from opposition leader Kemal Kılıçdaroğlu, as well as protests in Istanbul.

== See also ==
- Coal in Turkey
