= Gökçebey District =

District of Zonguldak Province, Turkey

- District
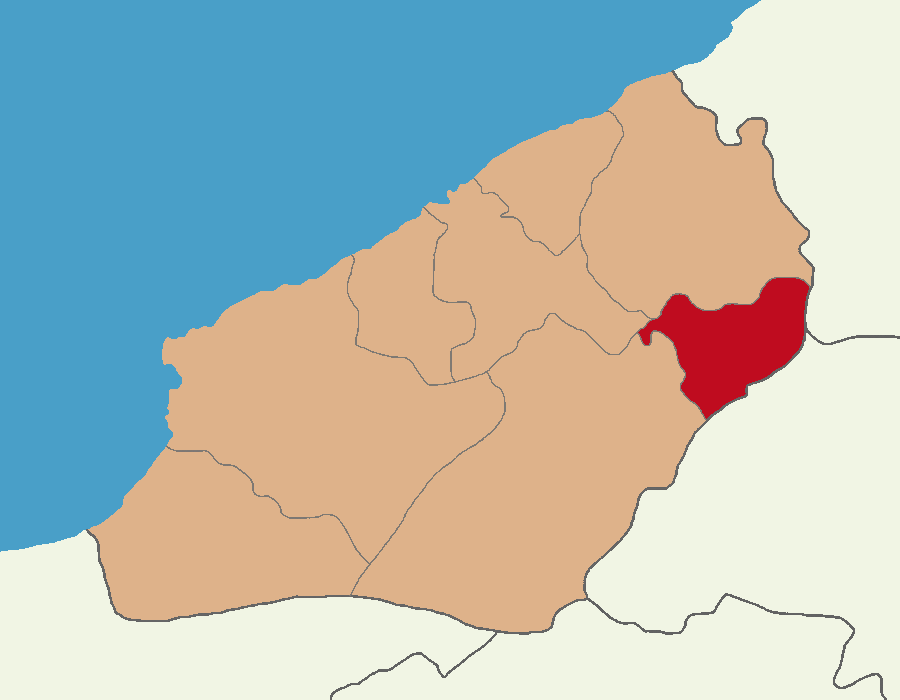
- Map showing Gökçebey District in Zonguldak Province

- Location in Turkey
- Coordinates: 41°18′N 32°08′E
- Country: Turkey
- Province: Zonguldak
- Seat: Gökçebey

Government
  - Kaymakam: Emrah Aslan
- Area: 183 km^{2} (71 sq mi)
- Population (2022): 21,165
  - Density: 120/km^{2} (300/sq mi)
- Time zone: UTC+3 (TRT)
- Website: www.gokcebey.gov.tr

Gökçebey District is a forested district of the Zonguldak Province of Turkey. Its seat is the town of Gökçebey. Its area is 183 km^{2}, and its population is 21,165 (2022). The district was created in 1990 from part of Devrek District.

== Composition ==
There are two municipalities in Gökçebey District:

- Bakacakkadı
- Gökçebey

There are 19 villages in Gökçebey District:

- Aktarla
- Aliusta
- Aydınlar
- Bakiler
- Bodaç
- Dağdemirciler
- Duhancılar
- Gaziler
- Hacımusa
- Karahatipler
- Karapınar
- Muharremler
- Namazgah
- Örmeci
- Pazarlıoğlu
- Saraçlar
- Uzunahmetler
- Veyisoğlu
- Yeşilköy
