= Göbü, Kilimli =

Göbü
- Village
- Location within Turkey
- Country: Turkey
- Province: Zonguldak
- District: Kilimli
- Population (2022): 850
- Time zone: UTC+3 (TRT)

Göbü is a village in Kilimli District, Zonguldak Province, Turkey. Its population is 850 (2022).
