= Turkish Hard Coal Enterprises =

Turkish state-owned coal mining organization

- Türkiye Taşkömürü Kurumu
- Abbreviation: TTK
- Formation: 1983
- Type: State Owned Enterprise
- Headquarters: Zonguldak
- Products: hard coal
- Official language: Turkish
- Leader: Kazım Eroğlu
- Website: taskomuru.gov.tr

Turkish Hard Coal Enterprises (Turkish: Türkiye Taşkömürü Kurumu, TTK) is the heavily subsidized state owned enterprise which has a virtual monopoly in mining, processing and distribution, including importing, of hard coal in Turkey. (Note: Taşkömür (literally stone coal) in Turkish means "hard coal". On Wikipedia, hard coal redirects to "anthracite". However total organic carbon of Turkish coal is up to 72.5%, whereas anthracite has over 86%. Therefore Turkey has no anthracite and the use of the phrase "hard coal" for coal mined in Turkey does not mean anthracite.) According to 21st century data up to 2014 Armutcuk, Karadon and Uzulmez were more hazardous than Amasra and Kozlu mines. Although coal mining accidents in Turkey decreased considerably after the government introduced tougher safety measures in the mid-2010s, the relative danger compared to other occupations since then is not publicly known, as the government restricted access to workplace death statistics. TTK made a loss throughout the 2000s and 2010s: 112,100 lira ($20,000) was lost (operating loss) per employee in 2019.

TTK only sells to the public sector. It is on the Global Coal Exit List compiled by the NGO Urgewald.

== Sources ==
- Doukas, Alex; Gençsü, Ipek (June 2019). "Turkey: G20 coal subsidies" (PDF). Overseas Development Institute.
- ŞAHIN, Ümit (April 2016). "TURKEY'S COAL POLICIES RELATED TO CLIMATE CHANGE, ECONOMY AND HEALTH" (PDF). Istanbul Policy Center.
