= Üzülmez coal mine =

Coal mine in Turkey

Üzülmez Coal Mine
- Location: Zonguldak Province, Turkey
- Products: Lignite

The Üzülmez coal mine is a coal mine located in the Zonguldak basin of Turkey.
