= İsdemir =

İSDEMİR İskenderun Demir ve Çelik A.Ş.
- Type: Anonim Şirket
- Founded: October 3, 1970
- Founder: Erdemir
- Headquarters: Payas, Hatay Province, Turkey
- Key people: Ali Aydın Pandır (Chairman), Recep Özhan (CEO)
- Products: pig iron, bar stock, wire rod, hot rolled flat steel, long steel
- Revenue: ▲US$3.20 billion (2024)
- Operating income: ▲US$451.5 million (2024)
- Net income: ▲US$413.04 million (2024)
- Total assets: ▲US$5.13 billion (2024)
- Total equity: ▲US$3.37 billion (2024)
- Owner: Erdemir (since 2002) with Ataer Holding (since 2006)
- Number of employees: 6,000+
- Website: www.isdemir.com.tr

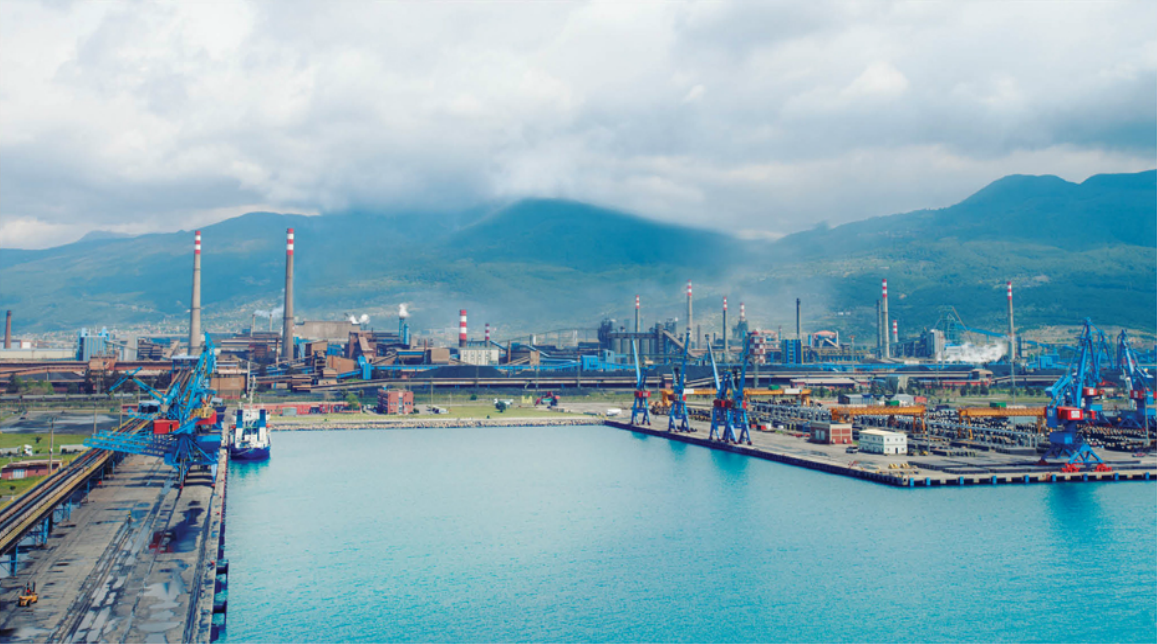
port of İsdemir

İsdemir is a Turkish steel producer located in Payas, Hatay Province on the Mediterranean coast. The name is a contraction of the Turkish language İskenderun Demir ve Çelik A.Ş., which means "İskenderun Iron and Steel CO". İsdemir is currently an Erdemir venture, another steel works located in Ereğli at the Black Sea coast.

== Overview ==
Established in 1970 to produce long steel products, İskenderun Demir ve Çelik A.Ş. was incorporated into Erdemir Group on February 1, 2002. Production of flat steel began in 2008 at its İskenderun plant with the implementation of modernization and transformation investments so as to balance long and flat steel production levels in Turkey.

Located in a 6.8 million square metres (73×10^{6} sq ft) area in Payas, İsdemir has an annual liquid steel production capacity of 5.3 Mt (million tonnes). In addition, it has reached 6 Mt of finished-product capacity, with 3.5 Mt of flat and 2.5 Mt of long steel products.

== Pollution ==
İsdemir burns coal in Turkey. As an integrated steelworks, emissions are higher than steel produced at electric arc furnaces. Climate Trace estimates the plant emitted over 8 million tonnes of carbon dioxide in 2023, more greenhouse gas than any other steelmaker in the country.

== See also ==
- List of steel producers
- List of companies of Turkey
