= Gökçebey =

- Municipality
- Location within Turkey
- Coordinates: 41°18′29″N 32°08′30″E
- Country: Turkey
- Province: Zonguldak
- District: Gökçebey

Government
  - Mayor: Vedat Öztürk (CHP)
- Elevation: 60 m (200 ft)
- Population (2022): 8,673
- Time zone: UTC+3 (TRT)
- Postal code: 67670
- Area code: 0372
- Climate: Cfa
- Website: www.gokcebey.bel.tr

Gökçebey (before 1954: Tefen Pazarı) is a town in Zonguldak Province in the Black Sea region of Turkey. It is the seat of Gökçebey District. Its population is 8,673 (2022). It was a town within Devrek District until 1990, and has been a municipality since 1972. The Ankara-Zonguldak railway passes through it. The mayor is Vedat Öztürk (CHP).
