= Soma mine disaster =

2014 mine fire in Turkey

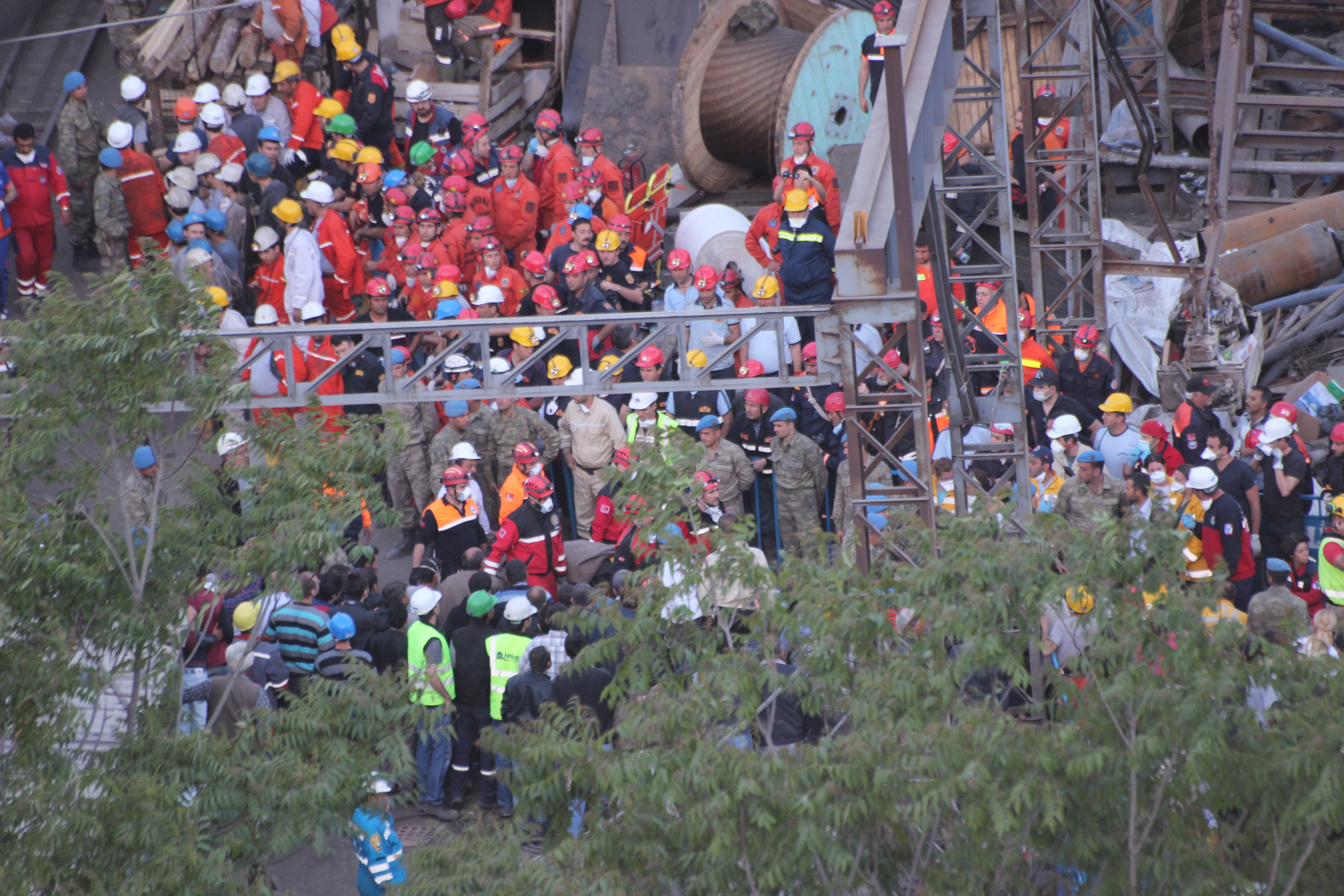
- Rescue workers carrying a miner on a stretcher, 15 May 2014
- Date: 13 May 2014
- Location: Eynez coal mine, Soma, Manisa, Turkey; 39°4′37.90″N 27°31′30.93″E
- Cause: Mine fire
- Outcome: 486 survivors
- Deaths: 301
- Injuries: 162

On 13 May 2014, a fire broke out at Eynez coal mine in Soma, Manisa, Turkey, killing 301 workers in the deadliest mining accident in the country's history. The mine was operated by Soma Kömür İşletmeleri A.Ş. under a contract with the state-owned Turkish Coal Operations Authority. There were 787 workers underground when the fire occurred near a shift change. Energy Minister Taner Yıldız said that most victims died of carbon monoxide poisoning. The search and rescue operation lasted 96 hours, and 486 workers survived.

The disaster prompted protests over mining safety and government oversight. On 29 April 2014, two weeks before the fire, parliament had rejected a motion by the opposition Republican People's Party to bring forward debate on a proposed inquiry into mining accidents in Soma, with the ruling Justice and Development Party voting against it. An expert report received by the trial court on 15 August 2016 identified failures in safety measures and official inspections.

On 11 July 2018, the Akhisar Heavy Penal Court convicted 14 defendants and acquitted 37. Following appeals, a retrial concluded on 16 June 2021 with a 20-year prison sentence for company chairman Can Gürkan and sentences of 12 years and six months each for Adem Ormanoğlu and Efkan Kurt. The Court of Cassation upheld the retrial judgment on 4 April 2022.

== Background ==
Soma coal mine (Turkey)

A 2010 study by the Economic Policy Research Foundation of Turkey (TEPAV) identified shortcomings in mining methods, production planning and ventilation as major contributors to mining accidents. It reported 7.22 deaths per million tonnes of hard coal produced in Turkey in 2008, compared with 1.27 in China.In May 2014, Anadolu Agency reported that more than 3,000 people had died in mining accidents in Turkey since 1941. According to figures from the mining union Dev Maden-Sen, 78 miners died in workplace accidents in 2012 and 95 in 2013. Before Soma, Turkey's deadliest mining disaster was a gas explosion in Kozlu, Zonguldak, on 3 March 1992, which killed 263 miners.

In 2012, the state-owned Turkish Coal Operations Authority (TKİ) held licences for coal reserves around Soma, and all of its underground production there was carried out by private contractors, under either service contracts or royalty (rödovans) agreements. The Eynez mine was worked under a service contract. In 2006 TKİ put out to tender the production of 15 million tons of coal from its Eynez underground fields and awarded the work to Park Teknik, a Ciner Group company, with output set at 1.5 million tons a year from the second year and completion originally due in March 2017. In October 2009, after producing 852,804 tons, Park Teknik asked to hand the contract over, citing fires during production, water in old workings and large faults, and TKİ's board approved its transfer to Soma Kömür İşletmeleri A.Ş., part of Soma Holding, at 27.45 lira per ton. A revised project approved by TKİ in August 2011 extended the completion date to March 2018.

Entrance to the mine after the disaster, 15 May 2014.

Annual output rose from 532,950 tons in 2009 to 2.6 million tons in 2010 and 3.8 million tons in 2012, and by the end of April 2014 all but 178,809 tons of the contracted 15 million tons had been mined. The experts appointed by the Soma public prosecutor called this a clear sign of production pressure and said it could be read as TKİ tolerating, even encouraging, that pressure.

Soma Kömür İşletmeleri also worked other TKİ reserves in Soma under a royalty agreement signed in 2005, selling all of its output to TKİ. A report by the opposition Republican People's Party (CHP) described a system of gang bosses (dayıbaşı) at the company, each in charge of a group of 40 to 50 workers, who sometimes recruited miners from villages and were paid bonuses when their group exceeded its production target. In 2012 Alp Gürkan, the holding's founder, said that TKİ had spent $130–140 to produce a ton of coal in Soma, whereas his company had undertaken to deliver it for $23.80, including a 15% royalty paid to TKİ.

In November 2013 hundreds of coal miners protested against working conditions by barricading themselves in a mine in Zonguldak.

On 29 April 2014, parliament rejected a motion by the opposition Republican People's Party to bring forward debate on a proposed inquiry into mining accidents in Soma, with the ruling Justice and Development Party voting against it.

== Fire ==
Initial reports attributed the disaster to a transformer explosion. A 2015 review by Yaşar and colleagues, drawing on a preliminary report by the Chamber of Mining Engineers, suggested that the fire began with coal heating in a gallery about 1,350 metres (4,430 ft) from the main entrance. The review described the fire spreading to conveyor belts, supports and cables. It also reported that a power cut stopped some ventilation units, allowing carbon monoxide to accumulate, particularly in the production areas.

According to TMMOB, the fire was noticed between 14:30 and 15:00. Workers attempted to contain it, and assistance was requested from nearby mines as the situation worsened. At around 17:00, after many workers on the air-intake side of the mine had been evacuated, the direction of the airflow was reversed.

The fire killed 301 workers, including five mining engineers. Energy Minister Taner Yıldız said that most of the victims died of carbon monoxide poisoning. The fire occurred near a shift change, and the number of workers underground was initially uncertain. The number was later reported as 787.

== Rescue effort ==
Rescue crews supplied fresh air to the mine workings to help workers trapped underground. Four mine rescue teams searched for trapped miners, but thick smoke initially hampered rescue efforts.

The search and rescue operation lasted 96 hours. A total of 486 workers were rescued, and the bodies of 301 workers were recovered.

== Reactions ==
=== Domestic ===
Protest outside Soma Holding's headquarters in Istanbul, 18 May 2014.

- The Turkish government announced three days of national mourning for the Soma coal mining victims.
- The Presidency of Religious Affairs announced that prayers for the victims would be held in mosques across Turkey on the following Friday.
- The Ministry of Youth and Sports cancelled Youth Week celebrations.
- The Turkish Football Federation (TFF) postponed matches in amateur and professional leagues scheduled for 14 and 15 May.
- Soma Kömür İşletmeleri A.Ş., the mine operator, replaced its website with a black page displaying a message of condolences.
- Prosecutors opened a criminal investigation into the disaster.
- Around 800 protesters hurled stones at the police and shouted anti-government slogans as they tried to march from Middle East Technical University (METU) to the Ministry of Energy and Natural Resources building in Ankara. Hundreds of demonstrators also gathered outside the headquarters of Soma Holding in Istanbul. Some had sprayed "Murderers" on the walls. During protests in Soma, Prime Minister Recep Tayyip Erdoğan appeared to push a man while his aide Yusuf Yerkel was seen kicking a protester lying on the ground. Yerkel was later granted sick leave for a soft-tissue injury to his right leg.
- During a press conference in Soma on 14 May, Prime Minister Recep Tayyip Erdoğan described such accidents as "ordinary things" and as being "in the nature" of mining, citing disasters in 19th-century England. During his visit, protesters surrounded his car and shouted abuse. He took refuge in a shop.
- KESK, one of the principal trade union confederations in Turkey, called for a one-day general strike for Thursday, 15 May, citing privatisation as the cause of the disaster.
- Thousands of protesters also gathered in Artvin, Bursa, Edirne, Eskişehir, Giresun, İzmir, Kırklareli, Kocaeli, Muğla, and Tekirdağ. Police used tear gas and water cannons against protesters.
- On 18 May, four people, including the company's operating manager Akın Çelik, were arrested, according to Anadolu Agency. Police had detained 25 people for questioning.

=== International ===
- Armenia – Armenian President Serzh Sargsyan offered condolences to the president of Turkey Abdullah Gul, the victims' families and wished quick recovery to the injured miners.
- Azerbaijan – Azerbaijani President Ilham Aliyev sent messages of condolence to President Abdullah Gül and Prime Minister Recep Tayyip Erdoğan.
- Egypt – Egyptian President Adly Mansour mourned the hundreds killed in the accident and offered condolences to President Abdullah Gul and the people of Turkey as well as the families of the victims, according to a presidential statement. In another statement, Egypt's foreign ministry offered condolences for the deaths. "We express our sincerest condolences to the sister state of Turkey, its friendly people and the families of the victims," Egyptian FM spokesman Badr Abdel-Ati said in the statement.
- Greece – Greek Deputy Prime Minister and Foreign Minister Evangelos Venizelos contacted his counterpart Ahmet Davutoglu to express the "deep condolences of Greek people at the tragic mine disaster," a Greek Foreign Ministry statement said. In addition, the Greek official expressed his country's readiness to offer any aid to the ongoing rescue operations to free workers still trapped in the mine.
- Holy See – Pope Francis made an appeal for prayer for the miners who died in the Soma mining disaster.
- India – Indian President Pranab Mukherjee expressed condolences to Turkish President Abdullah Gül. He condoled the loss of lives in Turkey's coal mine disaster and said that India stood by the people of Turkey in this difficult hour.
- Israel – The Israeli consulate in Istanbul expressed sympathy, saying they "bow their heads in sorrow at the tragic loss of life". Israel offered Turkey any assistance as required.
- Morocco – The king of Morocco, Mohammed VI, addressed a condolence message to the Turkish president Abdullah Gül, and through him, to the Turkish nation and the families of victims.
- Northern Cyprus – The Turkish Republic of Northern Cyprus declared two days of national mourning over the Soma disaster.
- Pakistan – Pakistan announced one day of national mourning over the tragedy.
- Russia – Russian President Vladimir Putin expressed condolences following the disaster.
- United Kingdom – Queen Elizabeth II and Prince Philip expressed their condolences. British Ambassador to Turkey Richard Moore expressed his condolences.
- United States – U.S. President Barack Obama expressed his condolences, saying "We share the grief of the Turkish people". U.S. Ambassador to Turkey Francis Ricciardone and U.S. President Obama's National Security Council (NSC) also offered condolences on behalf of the American people.

=== International organizations ===
- European Union – Enlargement Commissioner Štefan Füle expressed his condolences.
- Council of Europe – Secretary General Thorbjørn Jagland expressed his condolences.

=== Others ===
On 15 May 2014, Google displayed a black ribbon on its Turkish homepage in tribute to the victims. Hovering over the ribbon displayed a message of condolence.

Football clubs Beşiktaş, Fenerbahçe, Galatasaray and Trabzonspor from Turkey, Chelsea, Liverpool, Manchester City, and Sheffield United from England, Atlético Madrid and Barcelona from Spain, Borussia Dortmund and Schalke 04 from Germany, Porto from Portugal, and Persepolis from Iran published messages of condolence about the disaster. On 14 May 2014, Beşiktaş announced that all ticket revenue from its match against Gençlerbirliği on 17 May would be donated to people in need in Soma. Fenerbahçe announced a fund to cover the education expenses of 100 children from Soma for five years.

Sheffield United and Fenerbahçe played a charity match at Bramall Lane on 31 July 2014 to support those affected by the disaster. On 6 August 2014, Galatasaray and Atlético Madrid played a friendly at İzmir Atatürk Stadium to raise funds for the families of the miners who died.

== Investigations ==
An expert report was received by the Akhisar Heavy Penal Court on 15 August 2016. It identified failures in safety measures and official inspections.

=== Safety deficiencies ===
A 2017 study by Leyla Derin, Nehir Varol and Sadi Uymaz, drawing on the 2014 expert report, described ventilation that was inadequate for increased production and workforce size, shortcomings in respiratory protection and communications equipment, and inadequate or faulty gas and temperature sensors. The authors reported that high carbon monoxide readings had been recorded without preventive action being taken. They also identified the use of combustible materials and deficiencies in the electrical system.

The same study identified the absence of an emergency evacuation plan and an emergency escape gallery. It also described inadequate safety training and insufficient numbers of occupational safety specialists, and identified failures to implement existing regulations as an important factor in the disaster.

=== Subsequent analyses ===
H. Şebnem Düzgün and Nancy Leveson's 2018 analysis compared five official reports, including reports from the Labour Inspection Board, a parliamentary inquiry and court-appointed experts. The reports differed in their explanations of how the fire began and in the evidence available to their authors. Düzgün and Leveson noted that the prolonged fire and measures taken to extinguish it had destroyed evidence, while accounts differed even over the fire's precise location. They considered the available evidence insufficient to establish conclusively which explanation was correct.

Their reconstruction described blasting to level a main roadway, followed by a roof fall and fire. Their broader analysis identified underestimated risks, production exceeding the mine's design and operating capacity, shortages of qualified inspectors, and insufficient protection of inspection bodies from political pressure. They also identified a conflict of interest where mining companies employed the technical supervisors responsible for monitoring their safety practices.

A 2026 study by K. Baris examined ventilation failures at Soma alongside the Karadon and Amasra disasters. It identified recurring problems in mine and ventilation design, gas monitoring, electrical equipment and ventilation practices.

== Legal proceedings ==
=== Main criminal trial ===
The first hearing took place on 13 April 2015. On 11 July 2018, the Akhisar Heavy Penal Court convicted 14 defendants and acquitted 37, including Soma Holding founder Alp Gürkan. Company chairman Can Gürkan received a 15-year prison sentence; Ramazan Doğru and İsmail Adalı each received 22 years and six months, while Akın Çelik and Ertan Ersoy each received 18 years and nine months.

On 30 September 2020, the 12th Criminal Chamber of the Court of Cassation overturned the judgment under appeal, holding that the defendants should have been convicted on the basis of possible intent (olası kast). Following an objection lodged by the Court of Cassation's chief public prosecutor's office on 8 January 2021, the chamber reconsidered its decision and required retrial on the basis of conscious negligence (bilinçli taksir).

The retrial concerned Can Gürkan, Adem Ormanoğlu, Efkan Kurt and Haluk Evinç. On 16 June 2021, it ended with a 20-year prison sentence for Can Gürkan and sentences of 12 years and six months each for Adem Ormanoğlu and Efkan Kurt. Haluk Evinç was acquitted. The Court of Cassation upheld the retrial judgment on 4 April 2022.

=== Proceedings against public officials ===
On 29 January 2020, the Constitutional Court ruled in Abdülkadir Yılmaz and Others (2) (application no. 2016/13649) that the refusal to authorize an investigation into public officials had violated the procedural aspect of the right to life. The application concerned officials responsible for inspecting the mine and officials of the Ministry of Labour.

The trial of 28 public officials on charges of misconduct in public office began at the Soma Second Criminal Court of First Instance on 8 May 2024. On 29 April 2025, the court acquitted ten defendants and sentenced 18 to prison terms ranging from five months to six months and seven days. The court deferred pronouncement of the judgments against those sentenced (hükmün açıklanmasının geri bırakılması, HAGB).

On 24 March 2026, ANKA reported that the 10th Criminal Chamber of the İzmir Regional Court of Justice had set aside the acquittal and deferred-pronouncement decisions concerning 16 defendants and dismissed their cases because the limitation period had expired. For the other 12 defendants, it amended the deferred-pronouncement decisions and rejected the appeals on their merits. The chamber also rejected appeals by the bereaved families in a decision dated 6 March 2026, holding that they had not been directly harmed by the alleged offences.

On 18 June 2026, ANKA reported that the 11th Criminal Chamber had overturned the rejection of the families' appeals. It held that the relatives had been directly harmed by the alleged offences and had the right to participate in the proceedings and appeal. The case was returned to the 10th Criminal Chamber for reconsideration.

According to a report published by Cumhuriyet on 16 September 2026, the 10th Criminal Chamber upheld the deferred-pronouncement decisions concerning 12 defendants on 3 July 2026. The newspaper reported that the chamber also imposed disqualification from public office for two months and 15 days, to take effect after execution of the sentence.

== Aftermath ==
Participants in a commemoration marking the first anniversary of the disaster, 10 May 2015.

The first anniversary was marked by marches and commemorations. On 13 May 2015, relatives visited the victims' graves in Soma.

According to a 2022 Anadolu Agency retrospective, an AFAD-coordinated fundraising campaign collected 50 million lira, and each bereaved family received 160,000 lira. Housing built through initiatives by municipalities, businesses and football clubs was also provided to the victims' families. A miners' memorial cemetery was established within Soma Cemetery, where 39 of the victims were buried.

Turkey ratified the International Labour Organization's Safety and Health in Mines Convention (No. 176) on 23 March 2015. The convention entered into force for Turkey on 23 March 2016.

Turkey's occupational health and safety regulation for mines underwent substantial amendments in 2015 following the disaster. These included requirements for underground monitoring of gases, temperature and air velocity. In a 2026 analysis, K. Baris argued that ambiguities in the revised ventilation requirements and sensor-placement rules hindered their implementation.

In a 2024 study, El Hassen Diahah and Oktay Şahbaz argued that changes to mining safety regulations in Turkey had generally followed disasters such as Soma, rather than being introduced as preventive measures.

== See also ==
- List of mining disasters
