= Kozlu coal mine =

Kozlu Coal Mine
- Location: Zonguldak Province, Turkey
- Products: hard coal (this is not anthracite)

Kozlu coal mine is located in the town of Kozlu, Zonguldak Province, in Turkey's Zonguldak basin. The mine has an annual production capacity of 2 million tonnes of coal. Total organic carbon values are quite variable.

== History ==
- The mine suffered a disaster (tr) in 1992, which killed 263 miners.
