= Karadon coal mine =

Coal mine in Zonguldak, Turkey

Karadon Coal Mine
- Location: Zonguldak Province, Turkey
- Products: Lignite

Karadon coal mine is a coal mine in the Zonguldak basin in Turkey. The mine has an annual production capacity of 3.2 million tonnes of coal. The 2010 Zonguldak mine disaster occurred in Karadon mine.
