= Erdemir =

Turkish steel producer

Ereğli Demir ve Çelik Fabrikaları T.A.Ş.

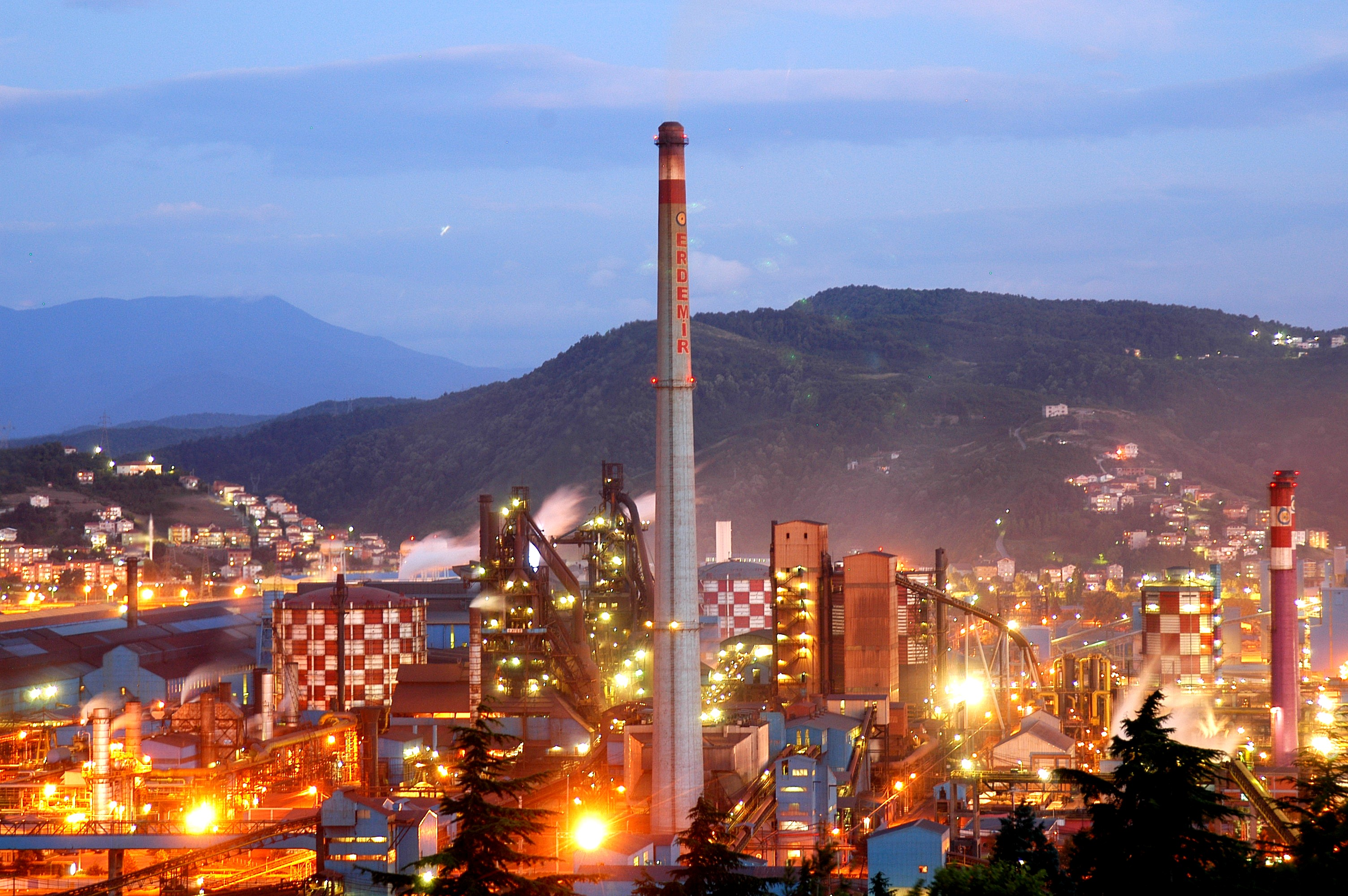
- Steel works of Erdemir
- Company type: Anonim Şirket
- Traded as: BİST: EREGL
- Industry: Steel Manufacturing
- Founded: May 1960, 11; 66 years ago
- Headquarters: Zonguldak, Turkey
- Products: Plates, hot and cold rolled sheet and tinplate
- Revenue: ▲US$6.242 billion (2023)
- Operating income: ▼US$0.562 billion (2023)
- Net income: ▲US$0.388 billion (Q3 - 2024)
- Total assets: ▲US$11.910 billion (2024)
- Total equity: ▲US$6.852 billion (2024)
- Owner: OYAK
- Number of employees: 12.487 (2023)
- Website: www.erdemir.com.tr

Ereğli Demir ve Çelik Fabrikaları T.A.Ş. (Ereğli Iron and Steel Factories) is a Turkish steel producer. Erdemir occupies the 43rd place among the largest steel companies in the world and is also involved in coal in Turkey.

== History ==
Erdemir, which began production in 1965, has a production capacity of 8.5 million tons/year of crude steel (2020 value). It is the largest iron and steel company in Turkey and was the only flat steel producer till January 2009. It produces plates, hot and cold-rolled sheet and tinplate.

Its main plant is located on an area of approximately 4 km^{2} (1.5 sq mi) at Karadeniz Eregli, Zonguldak on the shore of the Black Sea. Erdemir operates a large seaport, the Port of Erdemir, to import and export materials.

Erdemir has Port of Erdemir also acquired the steel plant at İskenderun, Hatay Province in southern Turkey.

Turkish Armed Forces Pension Fund (OYAK) acquired a 49.29% stake in Erdemir on 4 October 2005 for $2.77 billion in a televised auction, in which it outbid several major steel companies. The fund acquired 46.12% from the Turkish Privatization Board (OIB) and it was also obliged to purchase an additional 3.17% stake from a Turkish bank.

== Pollution ==
Erdemir burns coal in Turkey. As an integrated steelworks, emissions are higher than steel produced at electric arc furnaces. Climate Trace estimates the plant emitted almost 5 million tonnes of carbon dioxide in 2022, more greenhouse gas than any other steelmaker in the country except İsdemir. However the company says they are moving towards net zero emissions.

== List of 50 Projects ==
The Turkish chamber of Civil engineers lists Erdemir as one of the fifty civil engineering feats in Turkey, a list of remarkable engineering projects realized after the declaration of the Turkish republic.

== See also ==
- List of steel producers
- List of companies of Turkey
- Erdemir SK, Basketball club of Erdemir
- OYAK
- Port of Erdemir
