= Turkish Coal Operations Authority =

Coal mining organization belonging to the Turkish government, which mines lignite

- Türkiye Kömür İşletmeleri Kurumu
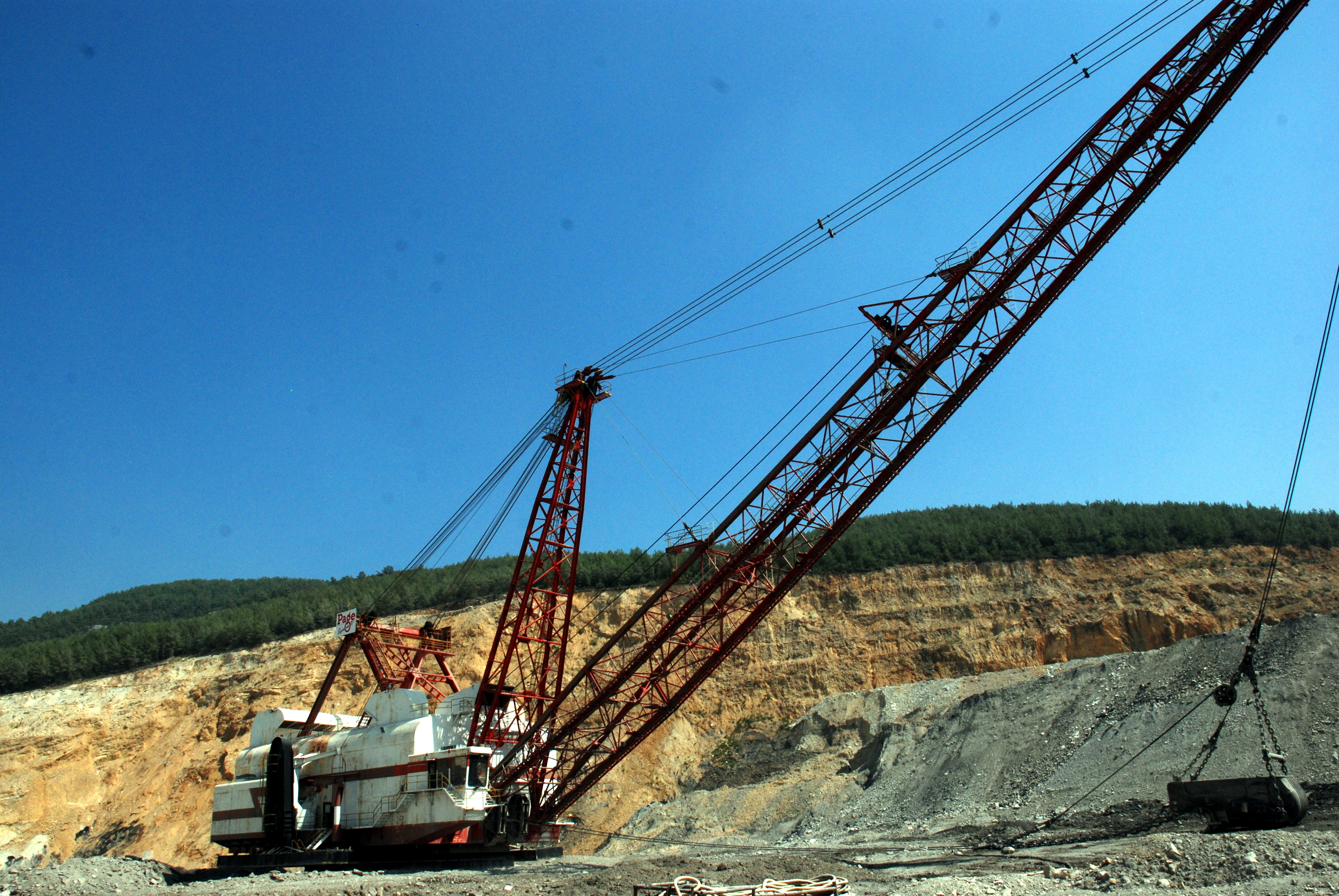
- Abbreviation: TKİ
- Type: State-owned enterprise
- Products: lignite
- Official language: Turkish
- Website: tki.gov.tr

The Turkish Coal Operations Authority (TKİ) is the state-owned enterprise which mines lignite coal in Turkey. Turkey is the third-largest lignite producer in the world, with 7% of total production. In 2018 TKI mined 30 Mt of which 16 Mt was open pit and 14 Mt underground: and in the same year 20 Mt was sold, 12.6 Mt to power plants and 7.4 Mt to industry and households. TKİ is on the Global Coal Exit List compiled by the NGO Urgewald. It employs about 4000 people.

== Economics ==
TKI's annual capital expenditure was ₺198 million (US$57 million) per year between 2016 and 2017., and the largest lignite mine in Turkey is Afşin-Elbistan. TKİ had been profitable but made losses in 2016 and 2017, and in 2021 the Court of Accounts criticised TKİ for losses which could continue for decades.

== Methane ==
Ventilation air from some mines such as Soma Eynez, contains significant methane; in 2019 studies were being done on how to capture it.

== Sources ==
- ŞAHIN, Ümit (April 2016). "TURKEY'S COAL POLICIES RELATED TO CLIMATE CHANGE, ECONOMY AND HEALTH" (PDF). Istanbul Policy Center.
- "Turkish Greenhouse Gas Inventory report". Turkish Statistical Institute (TurkStat report). April 2018.
- "Greenhouse Gas Inventory 1990 to 2016 in common reporting format (downloadable spreadsheets)". TurkStat. April 2018.
- "Status report on the annual inventory of Turkey". UNFCC. June 2018.
- OECD (February 2019). "OECD Environmental Performance Reviews: Turkey 2019". OECD. doi:10.1787/9789264309753-en. ISBN 9789264309746. S2CID 242969625.
- "Investor's Guide for Electricity sector in Turkey" (PDF). MENR Elec. October 2018.
- "Investor's Guide for Mining sector in Turkey" (PDF). MENR Mine. October 2018.
- Doukas, Alex; Gençsü, Ipek (June 2019). "Turkey: G20 coal subsidies" (PDF). Overseas Development Institute.
- Jensen, Genon K. (December 2018). "Lignite coal – health effects and recommendations from the health sector" (PDF). Health and Environment Alliance (HEAL).
- Çınar Engineering Consultancy (2019). Afşin C power station environmental impact report (Report) (in Turkish). Ministry of Environment and Urban Planning (Turkey).
- Mücella Ersoy, R&D and Foreign Affairs Manager, TKI (2019). Turkish Coal Mining Sector: Current State, Strategy for the Future (PDF) (Report). Turkish Coal Operations Authority.
