= Zonguldak basin =

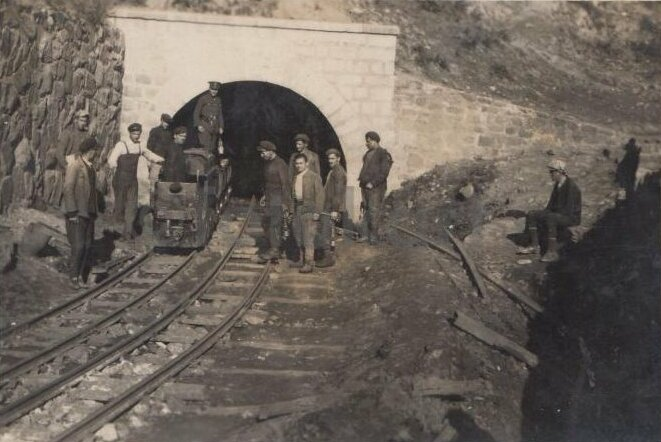
a Zonguldak coal mine, 1930

The Zonguldak basin of northwestern Turkey is the only basin in Turkey with mineable bituminous coal deposits. It has been mined for coal at least since 1848. The basin takes its name after Zonguldak, Turkey, and lies at approximately 41° N. It is roughly elliptical in shape with its long axis oriented roughly southwest to northeast, and is adjacent to the Black Sea. Three main regions have been recognized in the Zonguldak basin: from west to east, Armutcuk, Zonguldak, and Amasra.

== Depositional history ==
The Zonguldak basin has undergone two major periods of deposition. The first period began in the Paleozoic, and the second began in the Cretaceous. Isolated areas of deposition in the basin occurred during the Late Permian through the Triassic as well as the Latest Jurassic.

=== Paleozoic deposition ===
The Zonguldak basin first experienced deposition in the Ordovician. Deposition begins with the lower Ordovician Soğuksu Formation. The Soḡuksu Formation is 700–1100 meters thick. At its base it consists of green shale and sandstone and coarsens upwards to arkosic conglomerates. The lower Ordovician Aydos Formation conformably overlies the Soḡuksu. It is a conglomerate of quartzitic sandstone and is 50–200 meters thick. The Findikli Formation was deposited during the upper Ordovician, Silurian, and lowermost Devonian in the Zonguldak basin. It is 300–450 meters thick. Its facies are indicative of a mixed siliciclastic-carbonate shelf environment that is shallowing through time.

The red, cross-bedded sandstones of the Ferizli Formation overlie the marly deposits of the Fendikli Formation. The oolitic sandstones contain iron and an iron ore. The formation, like the Findikli Formation, shows a shift toward shallower depositional environments and a shift to higher energy areas of deposition. The younger sediments of the Ferizli Formation become progressively more enriched in calcium carbonate and eventually give way to the Yilanli Formation.

The Yilanli Formation is Visean in age and is the beginning of the coal-related sequences in the Zonguldak basin. The Yilanli is a dolomitic limestone unit with calcareous black and gray shales. It was deposited in a shallow marine passive margin setting. It is conformably overlain by the Alacaagzi Formation, and has accumulated over 1000 m of sediment. The Alacaagzi Formation contains economic deposits of coal. It is composed predominantly of crossbedded black shales and silts in the lower sections of the unit and progressively becomes composed of sands, shale bearing coals, and conglomerates towards the top of the formation. Facies analysis in the Alacaagzi Formation is suggestive of coastal environments including lacustrine, fluviatial, and fan deposits.

Conformably overlaying the Alacaagzi Formation is the Kozlu Formation. The Kozlu contains 19 coal seams totalling 30–32 m. The Kozlu is composed of successional conglomerate, sand, silt, mud, and coal deposits. The Karadon Formation conformably overlies the Kozlu. The Karadon is lithologically similar to the Kozlu Formation, but contains less coal seams. An angular unconformity spans the top of the Karadon formation and ranges from 46.5 Ma–194 Ma in duration.

=== Localized deposition ===
Deposition resumes in the western portion of the Zonguldak basin with the deposition of the Çakraz Formation. The Çakraz spans the upper Permian through the Lower Jurassic. Unconformably overlying the Çakraz is the Inalti Formation. The Inalti was deposited during the upper Jurassic and is truncated by an unconformity. The carbonates of the Inalti are representative of a shallow passive margin setting.

=== Cretaceous deposition ===
During the late Cretaceous, the Zonguldak basin was roughly 25° N, and was experiencing subsidence due to the formation of a back arc, the Black Sea. As a result, the Zonguldak experienced deposition from the early Cretaceous through the Eocene. Different authors present differing stratigraphic columns of the Zonguldak basin and this analysis will preferentially report more current research. The lithologies deposited during this period of deposition include limestones, mudstones, siltstones, and dolomites. The Albian, 105–100 Ma, Zonguldak Formation is predominantly limestone with areas of dolomitization. It is conformably overlain by the Albian, 105–112 Ma, Kilimli Formation. The Kilimli is composed of sandstone and carbonaceous sandstone.

The Kilimli is unconformably overlain by the sandy limestone of the Cemaller Formation. The unconformity lasts at least 6.5 Ma and the Zonguldak basin experiences continuous deposition from the Turonian – Campanian. The Cemaller is overlain by the siltstone and limestone of the Baþköy Formation. The Dinlence Formation overlies the Cemaller and consists of andesites and andesitic tuffites. It is possible that the Dinlence is the Yemislicay Formation since it too contains andesites and andesitic tuffites. The Dinlence is overlain by the marls, and limestones of the Alapý Formation.

== Tectonic history ==
=== Paleozoic ===
During the middle Paleozoic, the Zonguldak basin was part of the south-facing passive margin of the Laurasian plate. During the Carboniferous, the temperature of the sediment water interface was near 25 °C and heat flow into the Zonguldak basin was about 1.3 heat flow units (HFU). Backstripping analysis of the Alacaagzi Formation, the lowest coal-bearing formation, reaches a maximum temperature and depth of 100 °C and 2.4 km, respectively, in the Zonguldak area during the Carboniferous. Similarly, the base of the Kozlu Formation reaches maximum temperatures of 85, 85, and 100 °C in the Armutcuk, the Zonguldak, and the Amasra regions, respectively.

The Zonguldak basin was tectonically active during the late Paleozoic and this strongly influenced its structural and burial history due to the Hercynian orogeny. The Hercynian orogeny was the result of the continent–continent collision between Laurasia and Gondwana. This collision created many E-NE/W-SW striking faults, folds, and tilted the Paleozoic sediments. This uplift of the basin, near the end of the Westphalian, halted deposition and created the angular unconformity at the top of the Karadon Formation. Heat flow remained constant in the Zonguldak basin during the Hercynian Orogeny, while the uplift decreased the temperatures the sediments experienced. For example, at the end of the Permian the top of the Alacaagzi was roughly 70 °C and 1.6 km below the sediment surface in the Zonguldak area.

=== Mesozoic ===
During the Cretaceous, the Zonguldak basin experienced general subsidence, rifting, and faulting. This led to another period of deposition in the region and faulted the coal seams. This faulting provided a pathway for meteoric water to enter the coal seams.

During the Aptian, the Intrapontide Ocean, the ocean separating the Western Pontides tectonic region of Turkey form the Sakarya Continent, underwent subduction. This led to the formation of a back arc basin, the Black Sea. The start of this subduction is responsible for the unconformity between the Kilimi and Cemaller formations and marks the beginning of the Alpide orogeny in the region. The andesitic volcaniclastic sediments of the Yemislicay support the subduction of oceanic crust in the region during this time. The Zonguldak basin was able to sustain deposition after the start of the Alpide orogeny due to rifting in the Black Sea basin. The rifting in the Black Sea also increased heat flow into the Zonguldak basin during the Cretaceous. Heat flows were as high as 1.5–1.75 HFU, and the temperature of the sediment water interface was about 25 °C.

=== Cenozoic ===
The Intra-Pontide Ocean stopped subducting with the collision between the Western Pontides terrain and the Eastern Pontides terrain. The Aplide orogeny stopped deposition and uplifted the Zonguldak basin during the Eocene epoch beginning at 42 Ma. The coal bearing formations experienced the highest temperatures at the onset of the Alpide orogeny. For example, the base of the Kozlu Fm experienced temperatures of 125, 175, and 140 °C in the Armutcuk, the Zonguldak, and the Amasra regions, respectively.

The Alpide tectonic provinces in Anatolia, from north to south, are the Pontides, Anatolides, Tarides, and Border Folds. These provinces have roughly an east–west strike. The Zonguldak basin is currently being uplifted by the Alpide orogeny. Progressively older sediments outcrop toward the north of the basin.

== Source rock ==
=== Coals ===
The coals of the Alacaagzi, Kozlu, and Karadon formations are of bituminous rank. The Alacaagzi, Kozlu, and Karadon formations contain greater than 70%, 81%, and 81% total organic carbon (TOC), respectively.

=== Structure ===
The coals of the Zonguldak basin follow the mean evolution of type III kerogens. The coals of the Zonguldak basin show vitrinite reflectances (Ro) of 0.45–1.70%. Hoşgörmez et al. (2002) determined that the coals of the Kozlu formation exhibit Ro of 1.0–1.2%, which gives them a coal rank of high volatile A bituminous. Additionally, coalification increased with depth, and the coals became more aromatic with depth. The calorification of the coals also increased with depth.

=== Methane ===
The two broad scale pathways of methane production, thermogenic and biogenic generation, account for the majority of methane generation in coals. Thermogenic production of methane in coals begins at temperatures around 80 °C and peaks around 0.7–1.6% of vitrinite reflectance. Biogenic generation of methane takes place through two chemically distinguishable pathways. These pathways are carbon dioxide reduction and acetate fermentation and methanol/methyl utilization. Typically, biogenic production takes place early in the maturation of a coal bed, since the temperatures observed during the coalification process are high enough for sterilization. A coal bed may produce methane later in its history if it is uplifted and fractured. The uplifting of the beds cools them enough for colonization by microbes and fractures and faults provide inoculation pathways by the infiltration of surface water.

The coals of the Zonguldak basin were subjected to a complex depositional and tectonic history, and this influenced the basins methane generation. The Alacaagzi formation did not pass the 80 °C isotherm until it had been buried for 25 Ma. The Kozlu formation experienced two different conditions during its first 260 Ma. The bottom of the Kozlu was mostly below the 80 °C isotherm while the top of the formation was above it. With deposition in the Cretaceous, the Kozlu formation was buried beneath the 80 °C Isotherm. The Alacaagzi and Kozlu were uplifted past the 80 °C around 5 Ma. At this point the rocks had been fractured and meteoric water could inoculate the system with methanogenic microbes.

Isotopic data from wells in the Zonguldak basin suggest that the methane is primarily thermogenic in nature. There may have been some initial microbial methane generation in the coal beds or generation after the basin had been uplifted and meteoric water could enter the beds. Reinoculation is supported by the evidence of isotopically lighter gas occurring near cleats in the coal beds.

=== Shales ===
The organic rich shales of the Yilani contain up to 7.9% TOC, and the shales and siltstones of the coalbearing formations can contain 2–26% TOC. The organic matter is found as type II kerogen. While the Yilani entered the gas window, isotopic data suggest that most of the gas in the basin was derived from the Kozlu coal deposits and the associated organic rich shales.

=== Summary of source rock ===
The predominant source rock in the Zonguldak basin is coal. The most prolific source rock is the Kozlu Formation, containing the greatest volume of coal and the greatest amount of methane. This is in corroboration with the Ro values that suggest thermogenic production of methane in the Zonguldak basin would have been high. Methane generated by shale may be contributing a small amount to the total amount of methane found in the basin, but the majority is coal derived. Coal-derived methane appears to be mostly thermogenic in origin with some biogenic production.

== Reservoir ==
=== Coal ===
Coal is the primary reservoir lithology in the Zonguldak basin. Coal, since it is a solid hydrocarbon, cannot migrate. Coal is also an important reservoir lithology in the basin for methane. Methane in coal beds is primarily found in a sorbed state, while a very small fraction is found as a free gas. The gas is in the microporous structure of the coal at near liquid densities. Hoşgörmez et al. (2002) estimated that the coals of the Zongulak basin contain up to 12 cm^{3} g^{−1} of methane. Additionally, 90% of the methane in the Karadon Formation is adsorbed to the coal while 10% of it is found as free gas. The total volume of coal bed methane in the Karadon Formation in the Amasra region has been estimated to be 862.5–2600 million cubic metres.

=== Other units ===
The dolomites of the Yilani Formation are characterized as potential reservoir units. The sandstone units in the Alacaagzi, Kozlu, and Karadon formations are also potential reservoirs. Another formation with good reservoir qualities is the Yemislicay or Dinlence Formation. The base of the Yemislicay is characterized by a red pelagic limestone interlain with volcaniclastic sediments.

== Seals ==
Due to the microporous nature of coal, coal is a significant seal in the Zonguldak basin. Outside of the coal-bearing formations, the only other formation that can serve as a seal is the Kilimli Formation.

== Coal mines ==
Coal mines include Armutçuk coal mine and Karadon coal mine. The coal mines in the basin are operated by Turkish Hard Coal Enterprises (Türkiye Taşkömürü Kurumu).

== See also ==
- Zonguldak mine disaster
