= Zonguldak Province =

Province of Turkey

Zonguldak Province Zonguldak ili
- Province
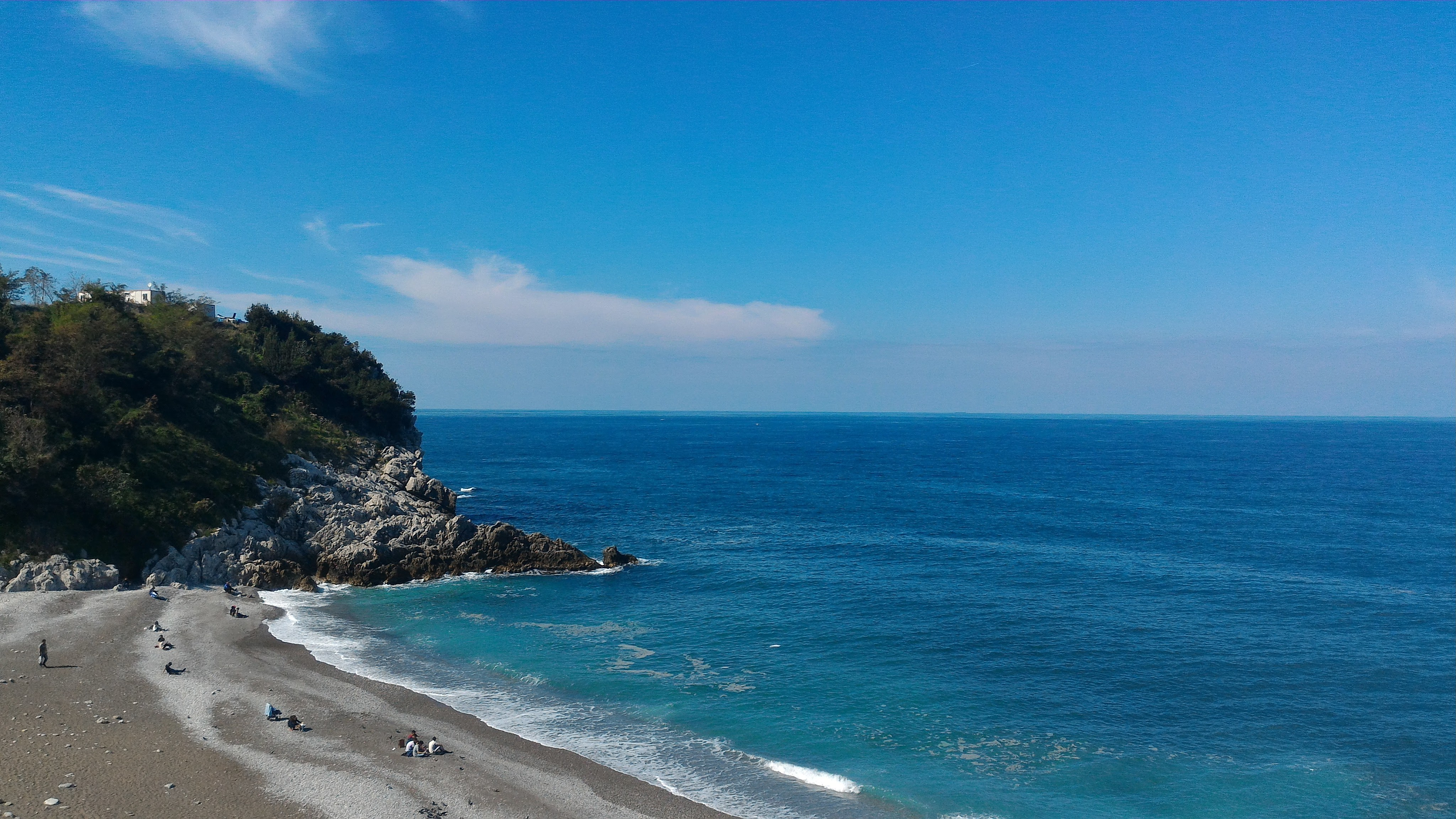
- A bay in Zonguldak

- Location of the province within Turkey
- Coordinates: 41°19′14″N 31°44′01″E
- Country: Turkey
- Seat: Zonguldak

Government
  - Governor: Osman Hacıbektaşoğlu
- Area: 3,342 km^{2} (1,290 sq mi)
- Population (2022): 588,510
  - Density: 176.1/km^{2} (456.1/sq mi)
- Time zone: UTC+3 (TRT)
- Area code: 0372
- Website: www.zonguldak.gov.tr

Zonguldak Province (Turkish: Zonguldak ili) is a province along the western Black Sea coast region of Turkey. Its area is 3,342 km^{2}, and its population is 588,510 (2022). Its adjacent provinces are Düzce to the southwest, Bolu to the south, Karabük to the southeast, and Bartın to the east. The capital is Zonguldak. Its Governor is Osman Hacıbektaşoğlu.

== Districts ==
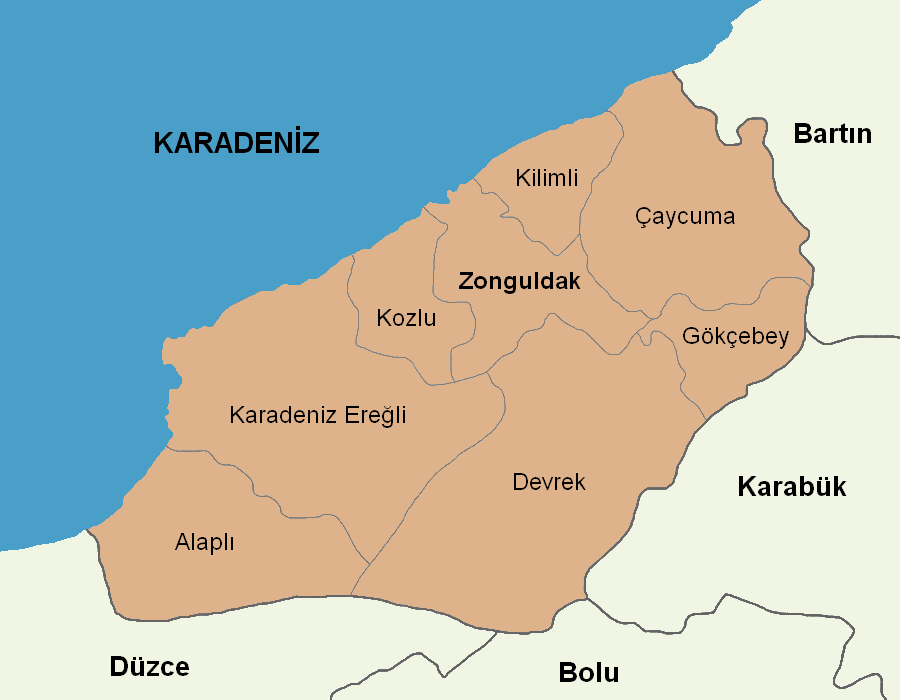

Zonguldak province is divided into 8 districts (capital district in bold):

- Alaplı
- Çaycuma
- Devrek
- Ereğli
- Gökçebey
- Kilimli
- Kozlu
- **Zonguldak**

== Coal ==
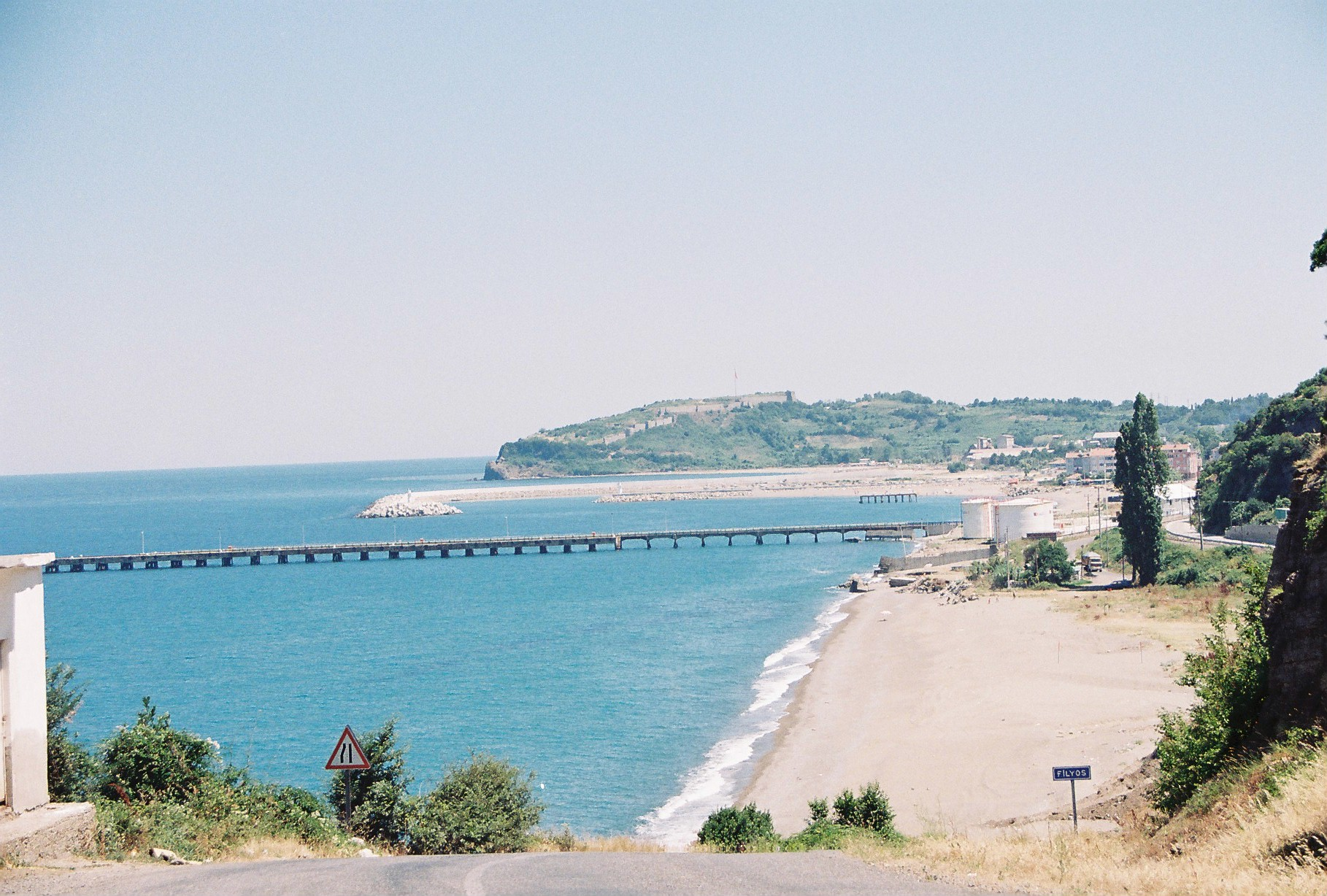
Filyos Bay, Zonguldak

The discovery of coal in the Ereğli (Heraclea) region (known today as the Zonguldak basin) dates back to the reign of Sultan Mahmud II, and its extraction to Sultan Abdulmejid I's reign.

The first specimen of Turkish coal was brought from Ereğli to Istanbul in 1822, but nothing was done for exploration and exploitation of this coal. However, in 1829, another specimen of coal was brought to Istanbul by Uzun (Long) Mehmet, a sailor and native of the village of Kestaneci, near Ereğli. This time attention was given to the discovery and the sailor received a reward of a life pension, but before he could benefit from this reward he was murdered.

The first miners requested and delivered from the Austrian Government are the Austrian Croats known to have been employed in the Ereğli Coal Mines. The correspondence between Istanbul and the embassy in Vienna shows that coal production in the Ereğli Basin predates the March 1837 request by 18 months and that production started around September 1835.

An investigation of Hazine-i Hassa (Ottoman Imperial Treasury Department) records in the Ottoman archives shows that regular mining activities in the Ereğli Basin started in February 1841. This is confirmed by a newspaper article published in the 14 February 1841 issue of Ceride-i Havadis.

Ereğli Coal Company, chartered by six partners (Ahmed Fethi Pasha, Rıza Pasha, Safveti Pasha, Tahir Bey Efendi, Izzet Pasha and Mustafa Efendi), excavated the coal in the Ereğli Coal Basin, initially under the auspices of Darphane-i Amire and later transferred to Hazine-i Hassa when the latter was established in 1849.

=== Coal mining today ===
Current coal mining/extraction zones of Zonguldak province/region
Armutçuk (Ereğli), Kozlu (Kozlu), Üzülmez (Zonguldak), Çaydamar (Zonguldak), Baştarla (Zonguldak), Kilimli (Kilimli), Karadon (Kilimli-Çatalağzı), Gelik (Çatalağzı), Amasra (Amasra, Bartın Province)
Coal washing/treatment plants
Zonguldak and Çatalağzı Coal Treatment Plants.
Coal transport (delivery and import)

- Ports: Zonguldak Sea Port (transport to Ereğli and Istanbul direction), Amasra Port, Ereğli Port
- Other usable port for mine transport: Bartın Port (coal, cement etc.)
- Railway: Zonguldak-Ankara Railway (transport to Karabük and Ankara direction)

Thermic power plants
Çatalağzı Thermoelectric Power Plant units (use coal powder), in Işıkveren ward.
Iron-steel plants
Ereğli (Erdemir) Iron and Steel Works, Karabük (Kardemir, Karabük province) Iron and Steel Works.

=== Mining disasters ===
Several mining disasters have occurred in the Zonguldak mines:

- 1992: A gas explosion killed 270 workers. This was Turkey's worst mining disaster.
- 2008: In a mine collapse, one miner died.
- 2010: In the 2010 Zonguldak mine disaster, an explosion in the state-operated Karadon mine, at least 28 miners were killed.

== Gallery ==
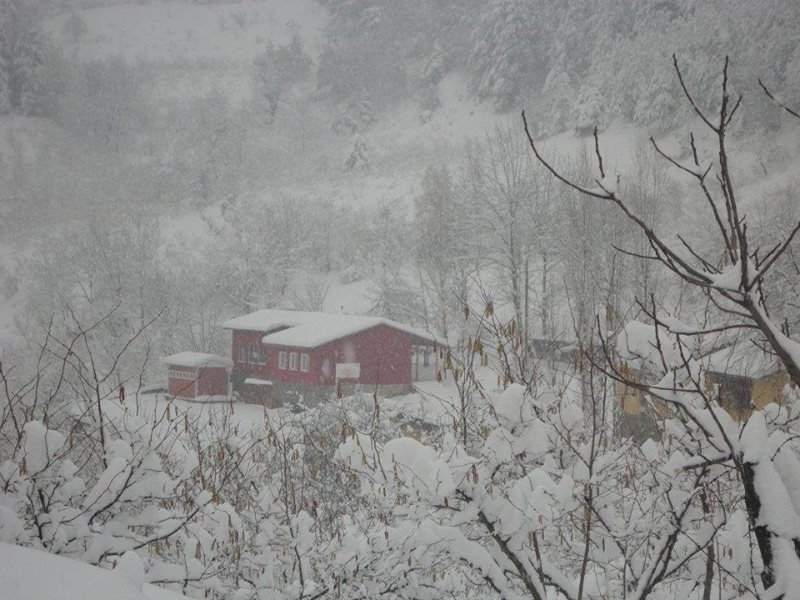
village of Başören, Ereğli, Zonguldak

== See also ==
- Erdemir
- Zonguldak basin
