= Boyabat Dam =

- Location within Turkey
- Country: Turkey
- Location: Boyabat, Sinop and Samsun Provinces
- Coordinates: 41°20′18.96″N 35°00′7.18″E
- Status: Operational
- Construction began: 2008
- Opening date: 2012
- Construction cost: US$1.2 billion
- Owner: Boyabat Elektrik

Dam and spillways
- Type of dam: Concrete gravity
- Impounds: Kızılırmak River
- Height: 195 m (640 ft)
- Length: 262 m (860 ft)
- Width (crest): 10 m (33 ft)
- Dam volume: 2,300,000 m^{3} (3,008,286 cu yd)
- Spillway type: Gated weir
- Spillway capacity: 8,250 m^{3}/s (291,346 cu ft/s)

Reservoir
- Total capacity: 3,557,000,000 m^{3} (2,883,707 acre⋅ft)
- Active capacity: 1,410,000,000 m^{3} (1,143,106 acre⋅ft)
- Inactive capacity: 2,147,000,000 m^{3} (1,740,601 acre⋅ft)
- Catchment area: 64,724 km^{2} (24,990 mi^{2})
- Surface area: 65.4 km^{2} (25 mi^{2})
- Maximum length: 60 km (37 mi)

Power Station
- Commission date: 2012
- Type: Conventional
- Hydraulic head: 141.3 m (464 ft) (max)
- Turbines: 3 x 171 MW Francis-type
- Installed capacity: 513 MW
- Annual generation: 1,500 GWh
- Website http://www.boyabatelektrik.com.tr/ (Turkish)

The Boyabat Dam is a concrete gravity dam on the Kızılırmak River bordering Sinop and Samsun Provinces, Turkey. It is 8 km (5 mi) southwest of Durağan and 24 km (15 mi) southeast of Boyabat. Construction began in 2008 and the dam and power plant were completed in December 2012. Its primary purpose is to generate hydroelectric power. The dam's power plant has an installed capacity of 513 MW.

== Background ==
Plans for the dam first began in 1958 when the Electrical Works Survey Administration studied the river for hydropower potential. By 1979, Turkey's State Hydraulic Works (DSI) and Japan's Electric Power Development Company completed feasibility studies. A final study and proposal was completed soon after. In 1986, DSI began preliminary works which included access roads and the diversion tunnels. Doğuş Holding was awarded the dam's tender on 18 September 1995. They signed a concession with Turkey's Ministry of Energy and Natural Resources on 22 October 1998. However, a license to operate the power plant was not awarded until 14 November 2007. Five Turkish banks had to fund US$750 million of the dam's US$1.2 billion price tag. The consortium owning the dam became Boyabat Elektrik. Construction on the dam began in April 2008, was delayed and restarted January 2012. The dam and power plant were accepted on 3 December 2012, and inaugurated nine days later.

== Design and operation ==
Built in a steep gorge of the Ilgaz mountains, the concrete gravity dam is 195 m (640 ft) tall and 262 m (860 ft) long. Its crest is 10 m (33 ft) wide and the body of the dam has a volume of 2,300,000 m^{3} (3,008,286 cu yd). The reservoir created by the dam covers an area of 65.4 km^{2} (25 mi^{2}) and is 60 km (37 mi) long. It stores up to 3,557,000,000 m^{3} (2,883,707 acre⋅ft) of water, 1,410,000,000 m^{3} (1,143,106 acre⋅ft) of which can be used for power generation. A catchment area of 64,724 km^{2} (24,990 mi^{2}) drains run-off into the reservoir. The dam passes flood waters with a gated weir spillway that is located on its crest. The spillway is controlled by six radial gates that pass water into six chutes. The chutes combine into three and flip buckets at their base dissipate energy. The spillway can discharge up to 8,250 m^{3}/s (291,346 cu ft/s) of water. The dam's power station is embedded in its body at the base and contains three 171 MW Francis turbine-generators. The maximum hydraulic head is 141.3 m (464 ft).

== Impact ==
The dam lake that reaches 60 km up-river and covers an area of 65,4 km^{2} changed the lives of 16.593 people living there. The new year 2012-1013 when the dam started collecting water 8 villages were inundated completely and 28 villages partly. Agricultural fields (2.840 in number, and 28.400.000 m^{2} in area), buildings (3.145 in number) were lost to the waters. A total area of 72.180.000 m^{2} was expropriated for 879.970.000 TRL. 1.435 of the residents had applied for relocation, of these 75% wished agricultural setting, 25% wished urban setting. The list of villages affected were as follows: Those administratively under Sinop's Saraydüzü : Yaylacılı, Fakılı, Akbelen, Hacıçay, Yalmansaray, Those administratively under Samsun's Vezirköprü: Susuz, Darıçay, Aşağı Darıçay, Kızılkese, Alanköy, Those administratively under Çorum's Osmancık : Aydın, Aşağı Zeytin, Yukarı Zeytin, Pelitçik, Aşıkbükü, Kalimavlağı, Those administratively under Çorum's Kargı : Avşar, Bağözü, Örencik, Saraycık, Sinanözü, Karaboya, Maksutlu, Köprübaşı, Demirören, Karapürçek, Gökçedoğan, and Karacaoğlan.

The 513 MW installed power capacity on the dam was 9% of the total Turkish electric power generation capacity of 56.759 MW. The investment was expected to generate 1 500 *106kWh per year worth 150 million TRL, a small but welcome correction to the 70% energy trade deficit of the country. The 4 year construction period was also a temporary boon to the local economy.

== See also ==
- List of dams and reservoirs in Turkey
