= Kargi =

Kargi may refer to:

- Kargi, Estonia, a village in Estonia
- Kargi, Hormozgan, a village in Iran
- Kargı, Çorum, a district in Çorum Province, Turkey
- Kargı, Mecitözü, a village in Mecitözü District, Çorum Province, Turkey
- Kargı, Osmancık, a village in Osmancık District, Çorum Province, Turkey
- Kargı, Beypazarı, a village in Ankara Province, Turkey
- Kargı, Bucak, a village in Burdur Province, Turkey
- Karğı, Çine, a village in Aydın Province, Turkey
- Kargı Dam, a dam in Eskişehir Province, Turkey
- Yahya Galip Kargı (1874–1942), Turkish politician
- Kargi, Kenya, a village in Kenya

== See also ==
- Khargi
- Karge (disambiguation)
