= Alioğlu =

Alioğlu can refer to:

- Alioğlu, Alaplı
- Alioğlu, Kargı
