= Yenidoğanlar, Alaplı =

Village administered by Alaplı District of Zonguldak Province in Turkey

Yenidoğanlar
- Village
- Location within Turkey
- Coordinates: 41°09′26″N 31°29′55″E
- Country: Turkey
- Province: Zonguldak
- District: Alaplı
- Elevation: 170 m (560 ft)
- Population (2022): 273
- Time zone: UTC+3 (TRT)
- Postal code: 67852

Yenidoğanlar (pronounced [jeniˈdoanlaɾ]) is a village administered by Alaplı District of Zonguldak Province in Turkey. Its population is 273 (2022). The village's name means "newborns" because it was a new village made of two other villages.

== Geography ==
The village is made from three neighborhoods, Büyükilyaslı and Küçükilyaslı Neighborhoods which used to be in Alaplıkocaali Village and Kızıllar Neighborhood, which came from Musabeyli Village and is the center neighborhood of the village.

It is 76 kilometres (47 mi) away from Zonguldak and 16 kilometres (9.9 mi) away from Alaplı.

== Population ==
Historical population
Year	Pop.	±% p.a.
1997	473	—
2007	418	−1.23%
2012	386	−1.58%
2017	306	−4.54%
2022	273	−2.26%
Source: Population census 1997 and TÜIK (2007–2022)

== Climate ==
The climate is in the Köppen Climate Classification of Cfb.

== Economy ==
The economy in the village is mostly based on agriculture, specifically hazelnut agriculture and animal farming. The only store in the village constitutes the trade, although the residents also go to neighboring Kurtlar Village (Kaptaş) and sometimes Karadeniz Ereğli for shopping too.

== Infrastructure ==
The village used to have a primary school with only 10 students, but after the migration of 4 pupils to the city it was closed. There are water pipelines but not sewage pipelines. There are no post offices or health organizations. The road that transports people to the village is asphalt. The village has electricity and cable phone.
