= UMAC =

UMAC may refer to:

- UMAC (cryptography), a type of message authentication code
- University of Macau
- Upper Midwest Athletic Conference, an NCAA conference
- Union Multipurpose Activity Center, an arena in Tulsa, Oklahoma
- Urban Music Association of Canada, a Canadian non-profit
- Umaç, Osmancık, a village in Turkey
