= Öbektaş =

Öbektaş may refer to the following places in Turkey:

- Öbektaş, Osmancık, a village in Osmancık District, Çorum Province
- Öbektaş, Kelkit, a town in Kelkit District, Gümüşhane Province
- Öbektaş, Emirgazi, a neighbourhood in Emirgazi District, Konya Province
