= Kabakçı =

Kabakçı can refer to:

- Kabakçı, Kargı
- Kabakçı Mustafa
