= Aiginetes =

Town of ancient Paphlagonia

Coordinates: 41°58′46″N 34°02′39″E

Aiginetes was a town of ancient Paphlagonia, inhabited during Roman and Byzantine eras.

Its site is located near Hacıveli in Asiatic Turkey.
