= Cihadiye =

Cihadiye can refer to:

- Cihadiye, Biga
- Cihadiye, Kargı
- Cihadiye, Sarıçam
- Cihadiye, Yenişehir
