= Çengelli =

Çengelli can refer to:

- Çengelli, Alaplı
- Çengelli, Oltu
