= Aydınköy =

Aydınköy can refer to:

- Aydınköy, Osmancık
- the Turkish name for Prastio, Nicosia
