= Çakırlar =

Çakırlar can refer to:

- Çakırlar, Kemah
- Çakırlar, Kargı
- Çakırlar, Tufanbeyli
- Çakırlar, Yapraklı
