= Sünlük =

Sünlük can refer to:

- Sünlük, Kargı
- Sünlük, Mustafakemalpaşa
