= Aydınyayla =

Aydınyayla can refer to:

- Aydınyayla, Alaplı
- Aydınyayla, Yığılca
