= Hacıhasan =

Hacıhasan can refer to:

- Hacıhasan, Alaplı
- Hacıhasan, Gölbaşı
- Hacıhasan, Ilgaz
- Hacıhasan, Karataş
