= Onurlu =

Onurlu can refer to:

- Onurlu, Alaplı
- Onurlu, Refahiye
