= Günyazı =

Günyazı can refer to:

- Günyazı, Ceyhan
- Günyazı, Kargı
