= Kuz =

Kuz may refer to:

- Kuz, Osmancık, a village in Çorum Province, Turkey
- Kunza language (ISO 639 code)
