= Hüseyinli =

Hüseyinli may refer to:

- Hüseyinli, Alaplı, a village in Zonguldak Province, Turkey
- Hüseyinli, Sincik, a village in Adıyaman Province, Turkey
