= Tekmen =

Tekmen is the name of several places in Turkey:

== People ==
- Ece Tekmen (born 2002), Turkish women's footballer

== Places ==
- Tekmen, Bozyazı, a town in Bozyazı district of Mersin Province
- Tekmen, Osmancık, a village in Osmancık district of Çorum Province
