= Karaboya =

Karaboya can refer to:

- Karaboya, Kargı
- a former name for Khnkoyan
