= Kasımlı =

Kasımlı can refer to:

- Kasımlı, Alaplı
- Kasımlı, Silvan
