= Uzunyurt =

Uzunyurt can refer to:

- Uzunyurt, Fethiye
- Uzunyurt, Kargı
