= Tomas peyniri =

Turkish cheese

- Region: Turkey
- Town: Eastern Anatolia region
- Source of milk: Sheep, goat
- Pasteurised: Traditionally

Tomas peyniri (also called serto) or karın kaymağı (cream of belly) is the name of a Turkish cheese traditionally made of sheep's milk and goat's milk. Tomas cheese, which is among the cheeses produced in Tulum in Eastern Anatolia Region, took its name from tomas, the Greek word for leather.

== Tomas cheese by location ==
- Erzurum karın kaymağı peyniri
- Kars karın kaymağı peyniri
- Dorak peyniri

== See also ==
- Turkish cuisine
