= Aşağıdoğancılar, Alaplı =

Aşağıdoğancılar
- Neighbourhood
- Location in Turkey
- Coordinates: 41.1684°N 31.4023°E
- Country: Turkey
- Province: Zonguldak
- District: Alaplı
- Municipality: Alaplı
- Population (2022): 496
- Time zone: UTC+3 (TRT)

Aşağıdoğancılar is a neighbourhood of the town Alaplı, Alaplı District, Zonguldak Province, Turkey. Its population is 496 (2022).
