= Başköy, Kargı =

Village in Turkey

Başköy
- Village
- Location in Turkey
- Coordinates: 41.2537°N 34.3537°E
- Country: Turkey
- Province: Çorum
- District: Kargı
- Population (2022): 60
- Time zone: UTC+3 (TRT)

Başköy is a village in the Kargı District of Çorum Province in Turkey. Its population is 60 (2022).
