= Baldıran, Osmancık =

Village in Turkey

Baldıran
- Village
- Location in Turkey
- Coordinates: 41.0198°N 34.5068°E
- Country: Turkey
- Province: Çorum
- District: Osmancık
- Population (2022): 101
- Time zone: UTC+3 (TRT)

Baldıran is a village in the Osmancık District of Çorum Province in Turkey. Its population is 101 (2022).
