= Ardıç, Osmancık =

Village in Turkey

Ardıç
- Village
- Location in Turkey
- Coordinates: 41.0203°N 34.6053°E
- Country: Turkey
- Province: Çorum
- District: Osmancık
- Population (2022): 202
- Time zone: UTC+3 (TRT)

Ardıç is a village in the Osmancık District of Çorum Province in Turkey. Its population is 202 (2022).
