= Yaylabaşı, Osmancık =

Village in Turkey

Yaylabaşı
- Village
- Location in Turkey
- Coordinates: 41°2′48″N 35°0′12″E
- Country: Turkey
- Province: Çorum
- District: Osmancık
- Population (2022): 722
- Time zone: UTC+3 (TRT)

Yaylabaşı is a village in the Osmancık District of Çorum Province in Turkey. Its population is 722 (2022).
