= Alaplıortacı, Alaplı =

Alaplıortacı
- Village
- Location within Turkey
- Coordinates: 41.1372°N 31.3975°E
- Country: Turkey
- Province: Zonguldak
- District: Alaplı
- Population (2022): 430
- Time zone: UTC+3 (TRT)

Alaplıortacı is a village in Alaplı District, Zonguldak Province, Turkey. Its population is 430 (2022).
