= Yenidanişment, Osmancık =

Village in Turkey

Yenidanişment
- Village
- Location in Turkey
- Coordinates: 40°58′48″N 34°54′41″E
- Country: Turkey
- Province: Çorum
- District: Osmancık
- Population (2022): 287
- Time zone: UTC+3 (TRT)

Yenidanişment is a village in the Osmancık District of Çorum Province in Turkey. Its population was 287 in 2022.
