= Kumbaba, Osmancık =

Village in Turkey

Kumbaba
- Village
- Location in Turkey
- Coordinates: 40°55′N 34°51′E
- Country: Turkey
- Province: Çorum
- District: Osmancık
- Population (2022): 275
- Time zone: UTC+3 (TRT)

Kumbaba is a village in the Osmancık District of Çorum Province in Turkey. Its population is 275 (2022).
