= Gökdere, Osmancık =

Village in Turkey

Gökdere
- Village
- Location in Turkey
- Coordinates: 41°2′50″N 35°1′56″E
- Country: Turkey
- Province: Çorum
- District: Osmancık
- Population (2022): 971
- Time zone: UTC+3 (TRT)

Gökdere is a village in the Osmancık District of Çorum Province in Turkey. Its population is 971 (2022).
