= Yağsüzen, Osmancık =

Village in Turkey

Yağsüzen
- Village
- Location in Turkey
- Coordinates: 41°01′N 34°46′E
- Country: Turkey
- Province: Çorum
- District: Osmancık
- Population (2022): 269
- Time zone: UTC+3 (TRT)

Yağsüzen (formerly: Yağsıyan) is a village in the Osmancık District of Çorum Province in Turkey. Its population is 269 (2022).
