= Alibey, Osmancık =

Village in Turkey

Alibey
- Village
- Location in Turkey
- Coordinates: 41.1087°N 34.8588°E
- Country: Turkey
- Province: Çorum
- District: Osmancık
- Population (2022): 55
- Time zone: UTC+3 (TRT)

Alibey is a village in the Osmancık District of Çorum Province in Turkey. Its population is 55 (2022).
