= Osmanlı, Alaplı =

Osmanlı
- Village
- Location within Turkey
- Coordinates: 41.1831°N 31.4161°E
- Country: Turkey
- Province: Zonguldak
- District: Alaplı
- Population (2022): 222
- Time zone: UTC+3 (TRT)

Osmanlı is a village in Alaplı District, Zonguldak Province, Turkey. Its population is 222 (2022).
