= Küçükkaymaz, Alaplı =

Küçükkaymaz
- Village
- Location in Turkey
- Coordinates: 41°05′N 31°27′E
- Country: Turkey
- Province: Zonguldak
- District: Alaplı
- Population (2022): 325
- Time zone: UTC+3 (TRT)

Küçükkaymaz is a village in Alaplı District, Zonguldak Province, Turkey. Its population is 325 (2022).
