= Oğuzköy, Kargı =

Village in Turkey

Oğuzköy
- Village
- Location in Turkey
- Coordinates: 41°5′57″N 34°15′6″E
- Country: Turkey
- Province: Çorum
- District: Kargı
- Population (2022): 97
- Time zone: UTC+3 (TRT)

Oğuzköy (also: Uğuz) is a village in the Kargı District of Çorum Province in Turkey. Its population is 97 (2022).
