= Belkavak, Osmancık =

Village in Turkey

Belkavak
- Village
- Location in Turkey
- Coordinates: 40.9949°N 34.8693°E
- Country: Turkey
- Province: Çorum
- District: Osmancık
- Population (2022): 77
- Time zone: UTC+3 (TRT)

Belkavak is a village in the Osmancık District of Çorum Province in Turkey. Its population is 77 (2022).
