= Kürkükler, Alaplı =

Kürkükler
- Village
- Location within Turkey
- Coordinates: 41°10′N 31°27′E
- Country: Turkey
- Province: Zonguldak
- District: Alaplı
- Population (2022): 305
- Time zone: UTC+3 (TRT)

Kürkükler is a village in Alaplı District, Zonguldak Province, Turkey. As of 2022 Its population is 305.
