= Akçataş, Kargı =

Village in Turkey

Akçataş
- Village
- Location in Turkey
- Coordinates: 41.2549°N 34.5028°E
- Country: Turkey
- Province: Çorum
- District: Kargı
- Population (2022): 32
- Time zone: UTC+3 (TRT)

Akçataş is a village in the Kargı District of Çorum Province in Turkey. Its population is 32 (2022).
