= Sarpunkavak, Osmancık =

Village in Turkey

Sarpunkavak
- Village
- Location in Turkey
- Coordinates: 40°57′N 34°42′E
- Country: Turkey
- Province: Çorum
- District: Osmancık
- Population (2022): 78
- Time zone: UTC+3 (TRT)

Sarpunkavak (also: Sarpınkavak) is a village in the Osmancık District of Çorum Province in Turkey. Its population is 78 (2022).
