= Gölet, Kargı =

Village in Turkey

Gölet
- Village
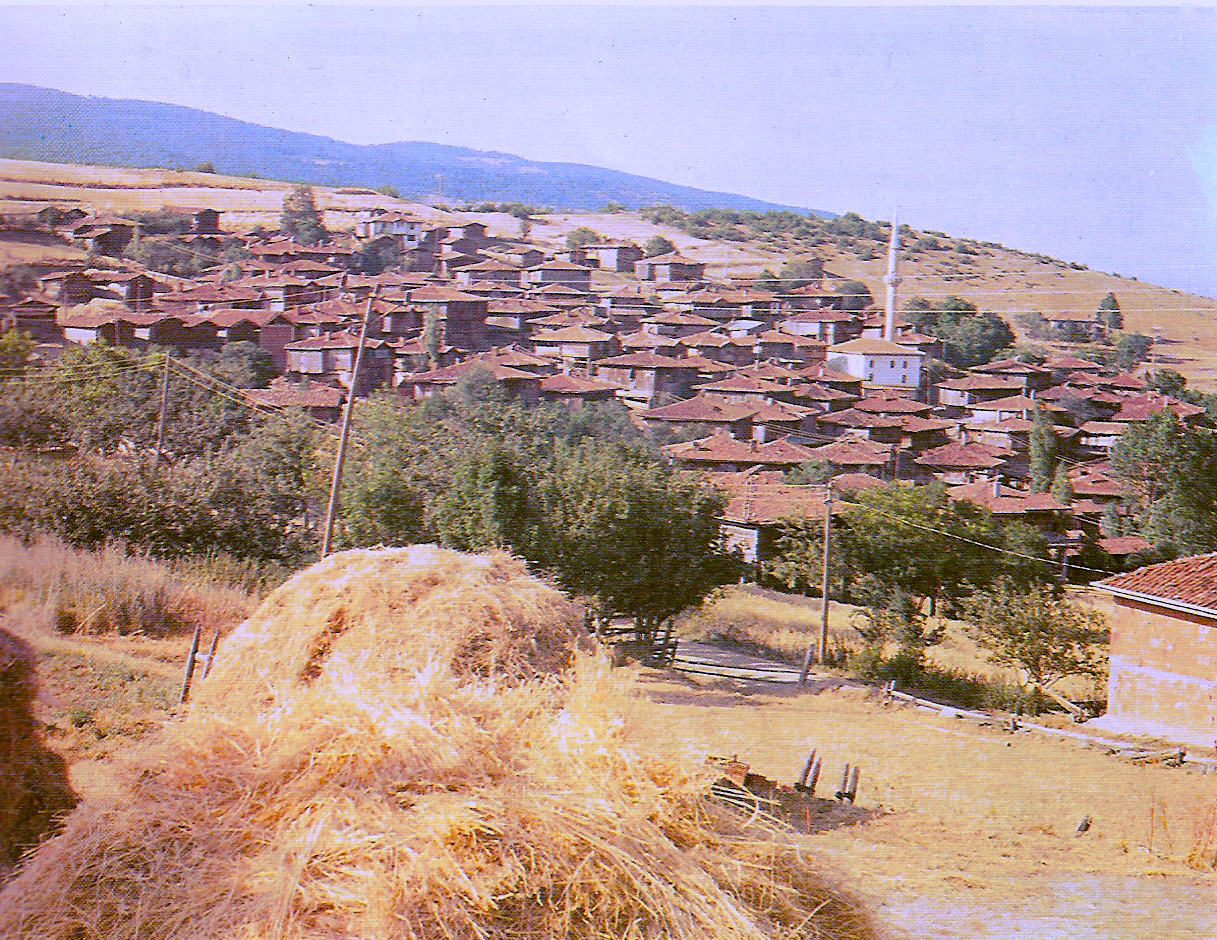

- Location within Turkey
- Coordinates: 41°16′N 34°39′E
- Country: Turkey
- Province: Çorum
- District: Kargı
- Population (2022): 174
- Time zone: UTC+3 (TRT)

Gölet is a village in the Kargı District of Çorum Province in Turkey. Its population is 174 (2022).
