= Çukuralıç, Kargı =

Village in Turkey

Çukuralıç
- Village
- Location in Turkey
- Coordinates: 40°59′N 34°25′E
- Country: Turkey
- Province: Çorum
- District: Kargı
- Population (2022): 490
- Time zone: UTC+3 (TRT)

Çukuralıç is a village in the Kargı District of Çorum Province in Turkey. Its population is 490 (2022).
