= Çatak, Alaplı =

Çatak
- Village
- Location within Turkey
- Coordinates: 41.1114°N 31.4578°E
- Country: Turkey
- Province: Zonguldak
- District: Alaplı
- Population (2022): 921
- Time zone: UTC+3 (TRT)

Çatak is a village in Alaplı District, Zonguldak Province, Turkey. Its population is 921 (2022).
