= Çobanlar, Kargı =

Village in Turkey

Çobanlar
- Village
- Country: Turkey
- Province: Çorum
- District: Kargı
- Population (2022): 98
- Time zone: UTC+3 (TRT)

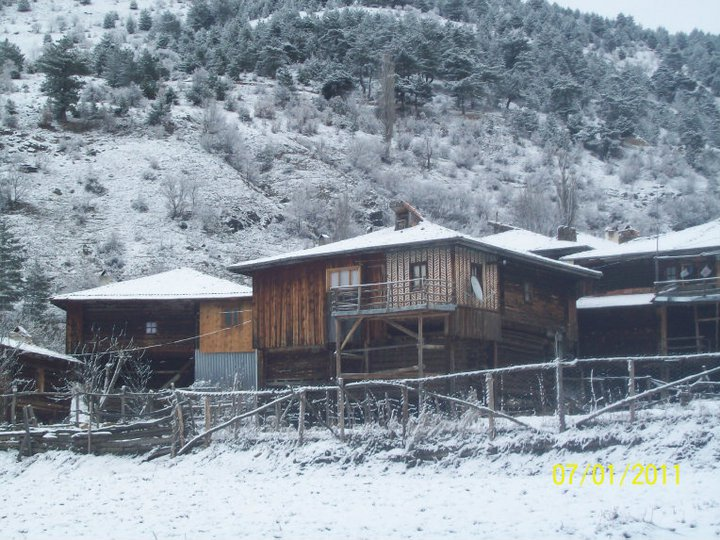
Çobanlar during winter

Çobanlar is a village in the Kargı District of Çorum Province in Turkey. Its population is 98 (2022).
