= Başpınar, Osmancık =

Village in Turkey

Başpınar
- Village
- Location in Turkey
- Coordinates: 40.9074°N 34.9397°E
- Country: Turkey
- Province: Çorum
- District: Osmancık
- Population (2022): 423
- Time zone: UTC+3 (TRT)

Başpınar is a village in the Osmancık District of Çorum Province in Turkey. Its population is 423 (2022). Before the 2013 reorganisation, it was a town (belde).
