= Yağcılar, Kargı =

Village in Turkey

Yağcılar
- Village
- Location in Turkey
- Coordinates: 41°17′02″N 34°30′50″E
- Country: Turkey
- Province: Çorum
- District: Kargı
- Population (2022): 43
- Time zone: UTC+3 (TRT)

Yağcılar is a village in the Kargı District of Çorum Province in Turkey. Its population is 43 (2022).
