= Küçüktekke, Alaplı =

Küçüktekke
- Village
- Location within Turkey
- Coordinates: 41°11′N 31°24′E
- Country: Turkey
- Province: Zonguldak
- District: Alaplı
- Population (2022): 211
- Time zone: UTC+3 (TRT)

Küçüktekke is a village in Alaplı District, Zonguldak Province, Turkey. Its population is 211 (2022).
