= Yeniköy, Alaplı =

Yeniköy
- Village
- Location within Turkey
- Country: Turkey
- Province: Zonguldak
- District: Alaplı
- Population (2022): 212
- Time zone: UTC+3 (TRT)

Yeniköy is a village in Alaplı District, Zonguldak Province, Turkey. Its population is 212 (2022).
