= Doğancılar, Alaplı =

Doğancılar
- Village
- Location within Turkey
- Country: Turkey
- Province: Zonguldak
- District: Alaplı
- Population (2022): 98
- Time zone: UTC+3 (TRT)

Doğancılar is a village in Alaplı District, Zonguldak Province, Turkey. Its population is 98 (2022).
