= Bektaşlı, Alaplı =

Bektaşlı
- Village
- Location within Turkey
- Coordinates: 41.1566°N 31.4803°E
- Country: Turkey
- Province: Zonguldak
- District: Alaplı
- Population (2022): 370
- Time zone: UTC+3 (TRT)

Bektaşlı is a village in Alaplı District, Zonguldak Province, Turkey. Its population is 370 (2022).
