= Sofullu, Alaplı =

Sofullu
- Village
- Location within Turkey
- Coordinates: 41°08′N 31°27′E
- Country: Turkey
- Province: Zonguldak
- District: Alaplı
- Population (2022): 164
- Time zone: UTC+3 (TRT)

Sofullu is a village in Alaplı District, Zonguldak Province, Turkey. Its population is 164 (2022).
