= Gökhasan, Alaplı =

Gökhasan
- Village
- Location within Turkey
- Coordinates: 41°11′20″N 31°26′10″E
- Country: Turkey
- Province: Zonguldak
- District: Alaplı
- Population (2022): 152
- Time zone: UTC+3 (TRT)

Gökhasan is a village in Alaplı District, Zonguldak Province, Turkey. Its population is 152 (2022).
