= Doğanköy, Osmancık =

Village in Turkey

Doğanköy
- Village
- Country: Turkey
- Province: Çorum
- District: Osmancık
- Population (2022): 146
- Time zone: UTC+3 (TRT)

Doğanköy is a village in the Osmancık District of Çorum Province in Turkey. Its population is 146 (2022).
