= Bademce, Kargı =

Village in Turkey

Bademce
- Village
- Location in Turkey
- Coordinates: 41°07′N 34°16′E
- Country: Turkey
- Province: Çorum
- District: Kargı
- Population (2022): 152
- Time zone: UTC+3 (TRT)

Bademce is a village in the Kargı District of Çorum Province in Turkey. Its population is 152 (2022).
