= Belen, Alaplı =

Belen
- Village
- Location within Turkey
- Coordinates: 41.0916°N 31.3809°E
- Country: Turkey
- Province: Zonguldak
- District: Alaplı
- Population (2022): 379
- Time zone: UTC+3 (TRT)

Belen is a village in Alaplı District, Zonguldak Province, Turkey. Its population is 379 (2022).
