= Aşağıtekke, Alaplı =

Aşağıtekke
- Village
- Location within Turkey
- Coordinates: 41.1722°N 31.4171°E
- Country: Turkey
- Province: Zonguldak
- District: Alaplı
- Population (2022): 164
- Time zone: UTC+3 (TRT)

Aşağıtekke is a village in Alaplı District, Zonguldak Province, Turkey. Its population is 164 (2022).
