= Gecek, Osmancık =

Village in Turkey

Gecek
- Village
- Location in Turkey
- Coordinates: 41.0029°N 34.9489°E
- Country: Turkey
- Province: Çorum
- District: Osmancık
- Population (2022): 296
- Time zone: UTC+3 (TRT)

Gecek is a village in the Osmancık District of Çorum Province in Turkey. Its population is 296 (2022).
