= Çamlıbel, Alaplı =

Çamlıbel
- Village
- Location within Turkey
- Coordinates: 41°9′43″N 31°24′29″E
- Country: Turkey
- Province: Zonguldak
- District: Alaplı
- Population (2022): 404
- Time zone: UTC+3 (TRT)

Çamlıbel is a village in Alaplı District, Zonguldak Province, Turkey. Its population is 404 (2022).
