= Avlağı, Osmancık =

Village in Turkey

Avlağı
- Village
- Location in Turkey
- Coordinates: 41.1211°N 34.8324°E
- Country: Turkey
- Province: Çorum
- District: Osmancık
- Population (2022): 349
- Time zone: UTC+3 (TRT)

Avlağı is a village in the Osmancık District of Çorum Province in Turkey. Its population is 349 (2022).
