= Ahiler, Alaplı =

Ahiler
- Village
- Location within Turkey
- Coordinates: 41.1537°N 31.4491°E
- Country: Turkey
- Province: Zonguldak
- District: Alaplı
- Population (2022): 235
- Time zone: UTC+3 (TRT)

Ahiler is a village in Alaplı District, Zonguldak Province, Turkey. Its population is 235 (2022).
