= Demirciler, Alaplı =

Demirciler
- Village
- Location within Turkey
- Country: Turkey
- Province: Zonguldak
- District: Alaplı
- Population (2022): 244
- Time zone: UTC+3 (TRT)

Demirciler is a village in Alaplı District, Zonguldak Province, Turkey. Its population is 244 (2022).
