= Ovacıksuyu, Osmancık =

Village in Turkey

Ovacıksuyu
- Village
- Location in Turkey
- Coordinates: 40°59′31″N 34°37′33″E
- Country: Turkey
- Province: Çorum
- District: Osmancık
- Population (2022): 124
- Time zone: UTC+3 (TRT)

Ovacıksuyu is a village in the Osmancık District of Çorum Province in Turkey. Its population is 124 (2022).
