= Gümüşoğlu, Kargı =

Village in Turkey

Gümüşoğlu
- Village
- Location in Turkey
- Coordinates: 41°16′53″N 34°20′32″E
- Country: Turkey
- Province: Çorum
- District: Kargı
- Population (2022): 70
- Time zone: UTC+3 (TRT)

Gümüşoğlu is a village in the Kargı District of Çorum Province in Turkey. Its population is 70 (2022).
