= Tepeyolaltı, Osmancık =

Village in Turkey

Tepeyolaltı
- Village
- Location in Turkey
- Coordinates: 40°57′N 34°31′E
- Country: Turkey
- Province: Çorum
- District: Osmancık
- Population (2022): 284
- Time zone: UTC+3 (TRT)

Tepeyolaltı is a village in the Osmancık District of Çorum Province in Turkey. Its population is 284 (2022).
