= Alaplı =

- Municipality
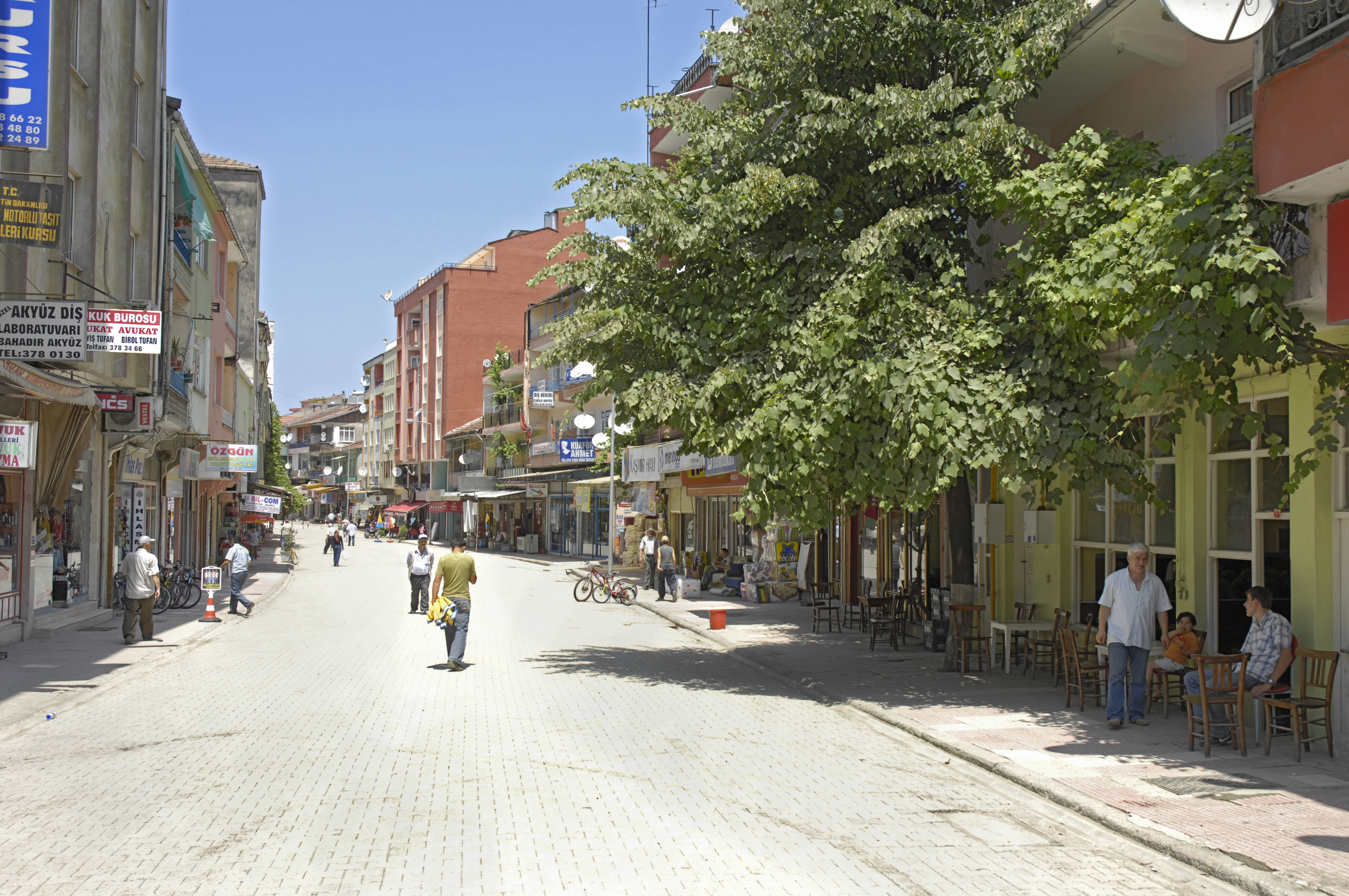

- Location within Turkey
- Coordinates: 41°10′50″N 31°23′10″E
- Country: Turkey
- Province: Zonguldak
- District: Alaplı

Government
  - Mayor: Nuri Tekin (CHP)
- Elevation: 10 m (33 ft)
- Population (2022): 20,777
- Time zone: UTC+3 (TRT)
- Postal code: 67850
- Area code: 0372
- Climate: Cfb
- Website: www.alapli.bel.tr

Alaplı is a town in Zonguldak Province in the Black Sea region of Turkey. It is the seat of Alaplı District. Its population is 20,777 (2022). It is the westernmost town in Zonguldak Province and is located about 15 km (9.3 mi) south of Karadeniz Ereğli.

Alaplı is situated at the mouth of the Alaplı River. It is an ancient town known in the Hellenistic period as Kales (Ancient Greek: Κάλης).

It consists of 6 neighbourhoods: Aşağıdoğancılar, Merkez, Yeni Siteler, Karşıyaka, Tepeköy and Yenimahalle.

There is a large statue of Mustafa Kemal Atatürk on the seafront at Alaplı.
