= Çeltiközü, Kargı =

Village in Turkey

Çeltiközü
- Village
- Location in Turkey
- Coordinates: 41°06′N 34°24′E
- Country: Turkey
- Province: Çorum
- District: Kargı
- Population (2022): 185
- Time zone: UTC+3 (TRT)

Çeltiközü is a village in the Kargı District of Çorum Province in Turkey. Its population is 185 (2022).
