= Alemdar (ship) =

History
- Name: 1899–1915: Danmark; 1915–1982: Alemdar
- Owner: 1899–1914: Em. Z. Svitzer Bjærgnings-Entreprise, Copenhagen; 1914–1921: Ottoman Navy; 1921–1929: Turkish Navy; 1929–1959: Turkish Maritime Lines; 1960–1964: A Turkish maritime company; 1964–1980: Isikurt Maritime; 1980–1982: Garzan Aksoy Maritime
- Port of registry: 1899–1914: (Denmark) Copenhagen; 1914–1921: (Ottoman Empire) Istanbul; 1921–1982: (Turkey) Istanbul
- Builder: Helsingörs Jærnsk & Maskinbyggeri
- Yard number: 70
- Launched: 1898
- In service: 1899
- Out of service: 1982
- Fate: Scrapped 1982

General characteristics
- Tonnage: 363 gross register tons (GRT)
- Length: 49.5 m (162 ft)
- Beam: 8.0 m (26.2 ft)
- Draught: 4.0 m (13.1 ft)
- Propulsion: 1 screw
- Speed: 10 knots (19 km/h; 12 mph)
- Crew: 28

Location of museum ship Gazi Alemdar in Turkey.

Alemdar, a.k.a. Gazi Alemdar, was a former Turkish salvage tug, which is best known for her victorious engagement with a French navy warship during the Turkish War of Independence. Built in 1898 in Helsingør as Danmark for Svitzer, the Danish-flagged vessel was seized by the Ottoman Empire during World War I. She served under Turkish flag until her scrapping in 1982. Since 2008, a replica of her serves as a museum ship at the port of Karadeniz Ereğli, Turkey.

== History ==
Built by Helsingør Skibsværft & Maskinbyggeri in Denmark, she was launched on 4 June 1898, and christened Danmark. On 21 May 1899, she began her service life in the company Em. Z. Svitzer Bjærgnings-Entreprise, Copenhagen. In accordance with the Capitulations of the Ottoman Empire, foreign-flagged ships were allowed to serve in Ottoman territorial waters, and Danmark was one of the ships serving in the Ottoman territorial waters. However, during World War I, the Ottoman Empire abolished the capitulations and took hold of the ship. In May 1915, she was renamed Alemdar, and continued its service in the Ottoman Empire. Her home port became Istanbul, the capital of the Ottoman Empire.

== Alemdar's escape to nationalists ==
During a salvage operation in the mouth of Kızılırmak River (Hallys of the antiquity) the ship crew came together with the Turkish National Movement, who were fighting against the Allies as well as the Ottoman government. Inspired by the revolutionaries, the chief engineer Osman decided to join them. On 5 February 1921, Alemdar with a crew of seven, sailed to Karadeniz Ereğli to change sides under the pretext of a salvage operation. They consigned the ship to nationalist forces. The number of the crew was now 21 excluding Osman who fell ill in Karadeniz Ereğli. The revolutionaries decided to send the ship to a port in eastern Black Sea, where the Allied blockade was weak.

== Alemdar's encounter with gunboat C-27 ==
The Allies high commander gave strict orders to arrest the crew and bring the ship back. On the night of 8 February 1921 when Alemdar was trying to sail to east, the French gunboat C-27 waiting in ambush out of Karadeniz Ereğli harbor, caught Alemdar. The French navy was especially active in western Black Sea because of the coal mines in Zonguldak, which is situated to the east of Karadeniz Ereğli. French commander Tilli and a small platoon embarked the ship, and the ship was directed to Istanbul with the gunboat in rear. After a short voyage, however, the crew overtook the French boarding party by surprise, and redirected the ship back to Karadeniz Ereğli. The gunboat opened fire, but fearing to wound the French seamen, they didn't use their heavy guns. In Karadeniz Ereğli harbor, the French gunboat maneuvered sailing between Alemdar and the pier. But this was not a wise choice; because the nationalists in Karadeniz Ereğli opened fire from the pier. According to Erol Mütercimler while the casualty of Alemdar was one death (Recep Kahya) and three wounded soldiers, the casualty of C-27 was two deaths and three wounded soldiers. The gunboat retreated. According to the agreement reached on 2 March, the French military personnel who were held captive were released and the French navy promised not to interfere Alemdar's voyage. This was a relatively small clash. But the news of arresting an allied commander brought a big morale for the nationalists.

== Later years ==
On 25 September, Alemdar sailed to Trabzon. In 1922, four cannons were mounted on board, and Alemdar began serving as one of the few warships of the nationalists. In 1929, she was sold to Turkish Maritime Lines returning to her civilian service. After several handovers, Alemdar was finally scrapped in 1982.

== Museum ship ==
In 2008, a replica of Alemdar moored at the port of the Karadeniz Ereğli (41°17′N 31°25′E), and opened to public on August 8 as a museum ship named Turkish: Gazi Alemdar Müze Gemisi. It was reported that 145,000 tourists from all over the world, more than the city's population of 102,000, visited the museum ship in 2013.

== Technical details ==
The technical details were

Length	49.47 metres (162.3 ft)
Width	7.95 metres (26.1 ft)
Draft (hull)	4.01 metres (13.2 ft)
Displacement (ship)	363 GRT 192 Nt.
Speed	10 knots
Fuel	coal
Crew	28

== Trivia ==
The above dates are in Gregorian calendar. In some sources the dates are given in Rumi calendar which was the official Turkish calendar in 1921. There is a difference of 13 days between the two. (i.e. February 5 in Gregorian calendar is January 23 in Rumi calendar.)

== Map ==
The locations
