= Seki, Osmancık =

Village in Turkey

Seki
- Village
- Coordinates
- Country: Turkey
- Province: Çorum
- District: Osmancık
- Population (2022): 49
- Time zone: UTC+3 (TRT)

Seki is a village in the Osmancık District of Çorum Province in Turkey. Its population is 49 (2022).
