= Deliler, Osmancık =

Village in Turkey

Deliler
- Village
- Country: Turkey
- Province: Çorum
- District: Osmancık
- Population (2022): 76
- Time zone: UTC+3 (TRT)

Deliler is a village in the Osmancık District of Çorum Province in Turkey. Its population is 76 (2022).
