= Hasanlı, Alaplı =

Hasanlı
- Village
- Location within Turkey
- Coordinates: 41°06′31″N 31°26′37″E
- Country: Turkey
- Province: Zonguldak
- District: Alaplı
- Population (2022): 277
- Time zone: UTC+3 (TRT)

Hasanlı is a village in Alaplı District, Zonguldak Province, Turkey. Its population is 277 (2022).
