= Sekibağı, Osmancık =

Village in Turkey

Sekibağı
- Village
- Location in Turkey
- Coordinates: 40°55′48″N 34°36′05″E
- Country: Turkey
- Province: Çorum
- District: Osmancık
- Population (2022): 67
- Time zone: UTC+3 (TRT)

Sekibağı is a village in the Osmancık District of Çorum Province in Turkey. Its population is 67 (2022).
