= Osmancık District =

District of Çorum Province, Turkey

- District
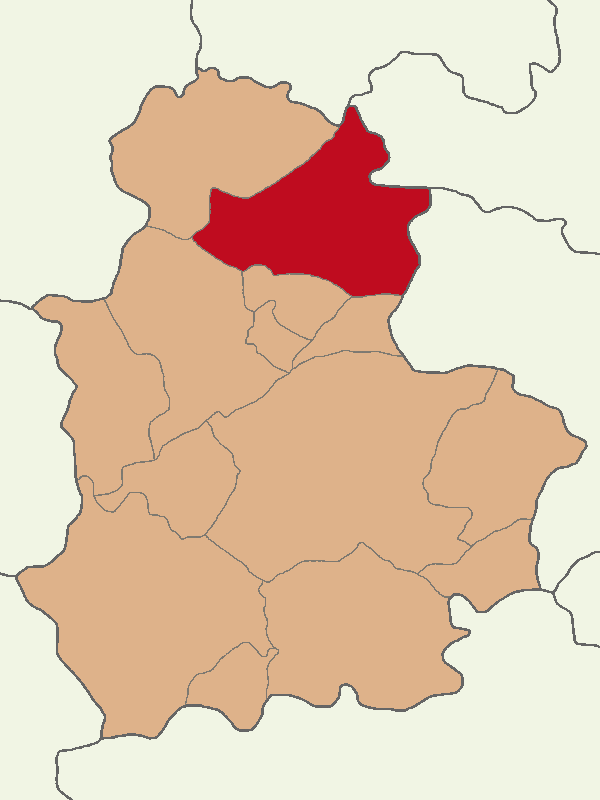
- Map showing Osmancık District in Çorum Province

- Location in Turkey
- Coordinates: 40°58′N 34°48′E
- Country: Turkey
- Province: Çorum
- Seat: Osmancık

Government
  - Kaymakam: Ayhan Akpay
- Area: 1,273 km^{2} (492 sq mi)
- Population (2022): 43,297
  - Density: 34/km^{2} (88/sq mi)
- Time zone: UTC+3 (TRT)
- Website: www.osmancik.gov.tr

Osmancık District is a district of the Çorum Province of Turkey. Its seat is the town of Osmancık. Its area is 1,273 km^{2}, and its population is 43,297 (2022).

== Composition ==
There is one municipality in Osmancık District:

- Osmancık

There are 55 villages in Osmancık District:

- Ağıroğlan
- Akören
- Alibey
- Ardıç
- Aşağızeytin
- Aşıkbükü
- Avlağı
- Aydınköy
- Baldıran
- Baltacımehmetpaşa
- Başpınar
- Belkavak
- Çampınar
- Çatak
- Çayırköy
- Danişment
- Deliler
- Doğanköy
- Durucasu
- Evlik
- Fındıcak
- Fındıkköy
- Gecek
- Girinoğlan
- Gökdere
- Güneşören
- Güvercinlik
- Hanefi
- İnal
- İncesu
- Kamil
- Karaçay
- Karaköy
- Karalargüney
- Kargı
- Kızıltepe
- Konaca
- Kumbaba
- Kuz
- Kuzhayat
- Öbektaş
- Ovacıksuyu
- Pelitçik
- Sarıalan
- Sarpunkavak
- Seki
- Sekibağı
- Sütlüce
- Tekmen
- Tepeyolaltı
- Umaç
- Yağsüzen
- Yaylabaşı
- Yenidanişment
- Yukarızeytin

== Population ==
Population by year
Years	Central	Villages	Total
2022	30,537	12,760	43,297
2008	24,678	26,486	51,164
2000	30,423	25,335	53,758
1990	21,347	31,143	52,490
1980			63,018
1970			53,849
1960			42,960
1927			29,184
1907			29,473
1893			17,639
