= Alaplıömerli, Alaplı =

Alaplıömerli
- Village
- Location within Turkey
- Coordinates: 41.1348°N 31.5123°E
- Country: Turkey
- Province: Zonguldak
- District: Alaplı
- Population (2022): 292
- Time zone: UTC+3 (TRT)

Alaplıömerli is a village in Alaplı District, Zonguldak Province, Turkey. Its population is 292 (2022).
