= Çatak, Osmancık =

Village in Turkey

Çatak
- Village
- Location in Turkey
- Coordinates: 40.9186°N 34.5813°E
- Country: Turkey
- Province: Çorum
- District: Osmancık
- Population (2022): 68
- Time zone: UTC+3 (TRT)

Çatak is a village in the Osmancık District of Çorum Province in Turkey. Its population is 68 (2022).
