= Beygircioğlu, Kargı =

Village in Turkey

Beygircioğlu
- Village
- Location in Turkey
- Coordinates: 41°06′N 34°23′E
- Country: Turkey
- Province: Çorum
- District: Kargı
- Population (2022): 233
- Time zone: UTC+3 (TRT)

Beygircioğlu is a village in the Kargı District of Çorum Province in Turkey. Its population is 233 (2022).
