= Girinoğlan, Osmancık =

Village in Turkey

Girinoğlan
- Village
- Location in Turkey
- Coordinates: 40°56′N 34°52′E
- Country: Turkey
- Province: Çorum
- District: Osmancık
- Population (2022): 242
- Time zone: UTC+3 (TRT)

Girinoğlan is a village in the Osmancık District of Çorum Province in Turkey. Its population is 242 (2022).
