= Sütlüce, Osmancık =

Village in Turkey

Sütlüce
- Village
- Country: Turkey
- Province: Çorum
- District: Osmancık
- Population (2022): 50
- Time zone: UTC+3 (TRT)

Sütlüce is a village in the Osmancık District of Çorum Province in Turkey. Its population is 50 (2022).
