= Sekiköy, Kargı =

Village in Turkey

Sekiköy
- Village
- Location in Turkey
- Coordinates: 41.03°N 34.4202°E
- Country: Turkey
- Province: Çorum
- District: Kargı
- Population (2022): 151
- Time zone: UTC+3 (TRT)

Sekiköy is a village in the Kargı District of Çorum Province in Turkey. Its population is 151 (2022).
