= Çetmi, Kargı =

Village in Turkey

Çetmi
- Village
- Country: Turkey
- Province: Çorum
- District: Kargı
- Population (2022): 216
- Time zone: UTC+3 (TRT)

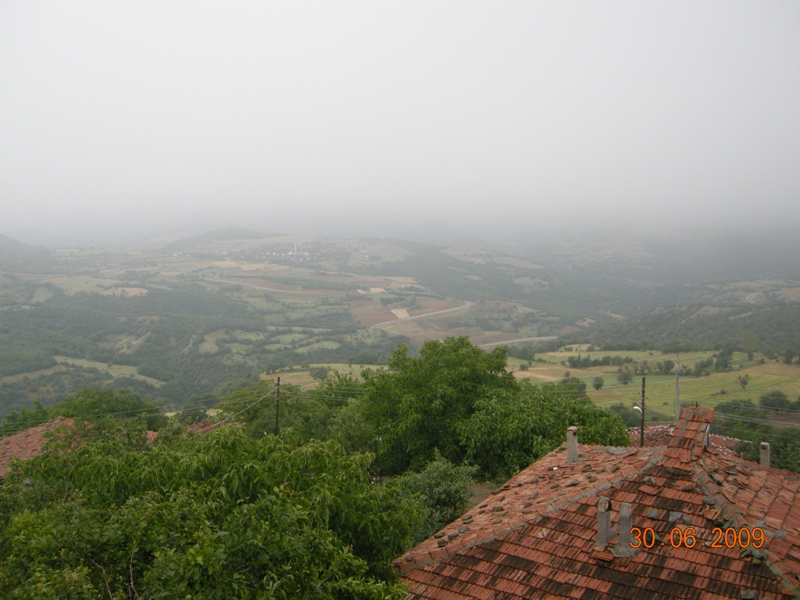
Çetmi in 2009

Çetmi is a village in the Kargı District of Çorum Province in Turkey. Its population is 216 (2022).
