= Büyüktekke, Alaplı =

Büyüktekke
- Village
- Location within Turkey
- Coordinates: 41°10′40″N 31°25′50″E
- Country: Turkey
- Province: Zonguldak
- District: Alaplı
- Population (2022): 175
- Time zone: UTC+3 (TRT)

Büyüktekke is a village in Alaplı District, Zonguldak Province, Turkey. Its population is 175 (2022).
