= Karaosmanlı, Kargı =

Village in Turkey

Karaosmanlı
- Village
- Location in Turkey
- Coordinates: 41°18′N 34°29′E
- Country: Turkey
- Province: Çorum
- District: Kargı
- Population (2022): 33
- Time zone: UTC+3 (TRT)

Karaosmanlı is a village in the Kargı District of Çorum Province in Turkey. Its population is 33 (2022).
