= Kavakçayı, Kargı =

Village in Turkey

Kavakçayı
- Village
- Location in Turkey
- Coordinates: 41°05′N 34°25′E
- Country: Turkey
- Province: Çorum
- District: Kargı
- Population (2022): 166
- Time zone: UTC+3 (TRT)

Kavakçayı is a village in the Kargı District of Çorum Province in Turkey. Its population is 166 (2022).
