= Gökbudak, Kargı =

Village in Turkey

Gökbudak
- Village
- Country: Turkey
- Province: Çorum
- District: Kargı
- Population (2022): 25
- Time zone: UTC+3 (TRT)

Gökbudak is a village in the Kargı District of Çorum Province in Turkey. Its population is 25 (2022).
