= Çiçekli, Alaplı =

Çiçekli
- Village
- Location within Turkey
- Country: Turkey
- Province: Zonguldak
- District: Alaplı
- Population (2022): 205
- Time zone: UTC+3 (TRT)

Çiçekli is a village in Alaplı District, Zonguldak Province, Turkey. Its population is 205 (2022).
