= Bayat, Kargı =

Village in Turkey

Bayat
- Village
- Location in Turkey
- Coordinates: 41.1862°N 34.2327°E
- Country: Turkey
- Province: Çorum
- District: Kargı
- Population (2022): 87
- Time zone: UTC+3 (TRT)

Bayat is a village in the Kargı District of Çorum Province in Turkey. Its population is 87 (2022).
