= Ağıroğlan, Osmancık =

Village in Turkey

Ağıroğlan
- Village
- Location in Turkey
- Coordinates: 40°56′N 34°49′E
- Country: Turkey
- Province: Çorum
- District: Osmancık
- Population (2022): 20
- Time zone: UTC+3 (TRT)

Ağıroğlan is a village in the Osmancık District of Çorum Province in Turkey. Its population is 20 (2022).
