= Alaplıbölücek, Alaplı =

Alaplıbölücek
- Village
- Location within Turkey
- Coordinates: 41°09′N 31°24′E
- Country: Turkey
- Province: Zonguldak
- District: Alaplı
- Population (2022): 310
- Time zone: UTC+3 (TRT)

Alaplıbölücek is a village in Alaplı District, Zonguldak Province, Turkey. Its population is 310 (2022).
