= Pelitözü, Kargı =

Village in Turkey

Pelitözü
- Village
- Country: Turkey
- Province: Çorum
- District: Kargı
- Population (2022): 106
- Time zone: UTC+3 (TRT)

Pelitözü is a village in the Kargı District of Çorum Province in Turkey. Its population is 106 (2022).
