= Hallı, Alaplı =

Hallı
- Village
- Location within Turkey
- Country: Turkey
- Province: Zonguldak
- District: Alaplı
- Population (2022): 457
- Time zone: UTC+3 (TRT)

Hallı is a village in Alaplı District, Zonguldak Province, Turkey. Its population is 457 (2022).
