= Evlik, Osmancık =

Village in Turkey

Evlik
- Village
- Country: Turkey
- Province: Çorum
- District: Osmancık
- Population (2022): 113
- Time zone: UTC+3 (TRT)

Evlik is a village in the Osmancık District of Çorum Province in Turkey. Its population is 113 (2022).
