= Kılçak, Alaplı =

Kılçak
- Village
- Location within Turkey
- Coordinates: 41°10′8″N 31°22′43″E
- Country: Turkey
- Province: Zonguldak
- District: Alaplı
- Population (2022): 1,469
- Time zone: UTC+3 (TRT)

Kılçak is a village in Alaplı District, Zonguldak Province, Turkey. Its population is 1,469 (2022).
