= Kuzhayat, Osmancık =

Village in Turkey

Kuzhayat
- Village
- Location in Turkey
- Coordinates: 41°06′N 34°48′E
- Country: Turkey
- Province: Çorum
- District: Osmancık
- Population (2022): 118
- Time zone: UTC+3 (TRT)

Kuzhayat is a village in the Osmancık District of Çorum Province in Turkey. Its population is 118 (2022).
