= Aşağıdağ, Alaplı =

Aşağıdağköy
- Village
- Location within Turkey
- Coordinates: 41.1266°N 31.5035°E
- Country: Turkey
- Province: Zonguldak
- District: Alaplı
- Population (2022): 1,050
- Time zone: UTC+3 (TRT)

Aşağıdağköy (also: Aşağıdağ) is a village in Alaplı District, Zonguldak Province, Turkey. Its population is 1,050 (2022).
