= Akkaya, Kargı =

Village in Turkey

Akkaya
- Village
- Location in Turkey
- Coordinates: 41.0761°N 34.6025°E
- Country: Turkey
- Province: Çorum
- District: Kargı
- Population (2022): 148
- Time zone: UTC+3 (TRT)

Akkaya is a village in the Kargı District of Çorum Province in Turkey. Its population is 148 (2022).
