= Kargı District =

District of Çorum Province, Turkey

- District
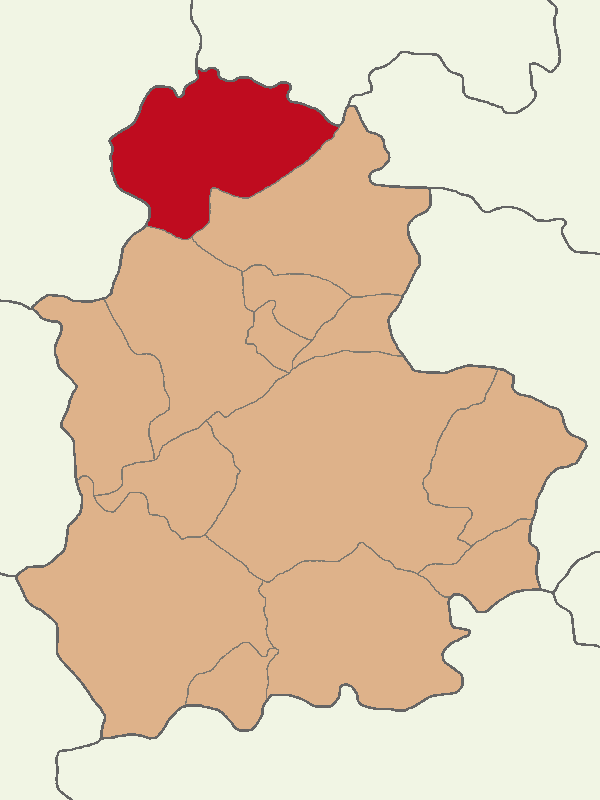
- Map showing Kargı District in Çorum Province

- Location in Turkey
- Coordinates: 41°08′N 34°29′E
- Country: Turkey
- Province: Çorum
- Seat: Kargı
- Area: 1,174 km^{2} (453 sq mi)
- Population (2022): 15,464
  - Density: 13/km^{2} (34/sq mi)
- Time zone: UTC+3 (TRT)
- Website: www.kargi.gov.tr

Kargı District is a district of the Çorum Province of Turkey. Its seat is the town of Kargı. Its area is 1,174 km^{2}, and its population is 15,464 (2022).

== Composition ==
There is one municipality in Kargı District:

- Kargı

There are 58 villages in Kargı District:

- Abdullah
- Akçataş
- Akkaya
- Akkise
- Alioğlu
- Arık
- Avşar
- Bademce
- Bağözü
- Başköy
- Bayat
- Beygircioğlu
- Bozarmut
- Çakırlar
- Çalköy
- Çeltiközü
- Çetmi
- Cihadiye
- Çobankaya
- Çobanlar
- Çukuralıç
- Demirören
- Dereköy
- Gökbudak
- Gökçedoğan
- Gölet
- Göletdere
- Gölköy
- Gümüşoğlu
- Güneyköy
- Günyazı
- Hacıhamza
- Hacıveli
- Halılar
- İnceçay
- Kabakçı
- Karaboya
- Karacaoğlan
- Karakese
- Karaosmanlı
- Karapürçek
- Kavakçayı
- Köprübaşı
- Koyunkıran
- Maksutlu
- Oğuzköy
- Örencik
- Pelitçik
- Pelitözü
- Saraçlar
- Saraycık
- Sekiköy
- Sinanözü
- Sünlük
- Tepelice
- Uzunyurt
- Yağcılar
- Yeşilköy
