= Kabalar, Alaplı =

Kabalar
- Village
- Location in Turkey
- Coordinates: 41.0944°N 31.4117°E
- Country: Turkey
- Province: Zonguldak
- District: Alaplı
- Population (2022): 467
- Time zone: UTC+3 (TRT)

Kabalar is a village in Alaplı District, Zonguldak Province, Turkey. Its population is 467 (2022).
