= İnal, Osmancık =

Village in Turkey

İnal
- Village
- Location in Turkey
- Coordinates: 41.0336°N 34.6908°E
- Country: Turkey
- Province: Çorum
- District: Osmancık
- Population (2022): 274
- Time zone: UTC+3 (TRT)

İnal is a village in the Osmancık District of Çorum Province in Turkey. Its population is 274 (2022).
