= Yedigelli, Alaplı =

Yedigelli
- Village
- Location within Turkey
- Coordinates: 41°08′N 31°25′E
- Country: Turkey
- Province: Zonguldak
- District: Alaplı
- Population (2022): 580
- Time zone: UTC+3 (TRT)

Yedigelli is a village in Alaplı District, Zonguldak Province, Turkey. Its population is 580 (2022).
