= Sabırlı, Alaplı =

Sabırlı
- Village
- Location within Turkey
- Coordinates: 41°09′03″N 31°23′07″E
- Country: Turkey
- Province: Zonguldak
- District: Alaplı
- Population (2022): 451
- Time zone: UTC+3 (TRT)

Sabırlı is a village in Alaplı District, Zonguldak Province, Turkey. Its population is 451 (2022).
