= Canbazlı, Alaplı =

Canbazlı
- Village
- Location within Turkey
- Coordinates: 41.1017°N 31.4561°E
- Country: Turkey
- Province: Zonguldak
- District: Alaplı
- Population (2022): 639
- Time zone: UTC+3 (TRT)

Canbazlı is a village in Alaplı District, Zonguldak Province, Turkey. Its population is 639 as of 2022.
