= Bozarmut, Kargı =

Village in Turkey

Bozarmut
- Village
- Location in Turkey
- Coordinates: 41.2596°N 34.4834°E
- Country: Turkey
- Province: Çorum
- District: Kargı
- Population (2022): 78
- Time zone: UTC+3 (TRT)

Bozarmut is a village in the Kargı District of Çorum Province in Turkey. Its population is 78 (2022).
