= Akören, Osmancık =

Village in Turkey

Akören
- Village
- Location in Turkey
- Coordinates: 41.0131°N 34.9944°E
- Country: Turkey
- Province: Çorum
- District: Osmancık
- Population (2022): 651
- Time zone: UTC+3 (TRT)

Akören is a village in the Osmancık District of Çorum Province in Turkey. Its population is 651 (2022).
