= Koyunkıran, Kargı =

Village in Turkey

Koyunkıran
- Village
- Location in Turkey
- Coordinates: 41°17′N 34°30′E
- Country: Turkey
- Province: Çorum
- District: Kargı
- Population (2022): 40
- Time zone: UTC+3 (TRT)

Koyunkıran is a village in the Kargı District of Çorum Province in Turkey. Its population is 40 (2022).
