= Abdullah, Kargı =

Village in Turkey

Abdullah
- Village
- Location in Turkey
- Coordinates: 41.0355°N 34.3455°E
- Country: Turkey
- Province: Çorum
- District: Kargı
- Population (2022): 137
- Time zone: UTC+3 (TRT)
- Postal code: 19900

Abdullah is a village in the Kargı District of Çorum Province in Turkey. Its population is 137 (2022).
