= Fındıklı, Alaplı =

Fındıklı
- Village
- Location within Turkey
- Country: Turkey
- Province: Zonguldak
- District: Alaplı
- Population (2022): 371
- Time zone: UTC+3 (TRT)

Fındıklı is a village in Alaplı District, Zonguldak Province, Turkey. Its population is 371 (2022).
