= Çalköy, Kargı =

Village in Turkey

Çalköy
- Village
- Location in Turkey
- Coordinates: 41.3111°N 34.4802°E
- Country: Turkey
- Province: Çorum
- District: Kargı
- Population (2022): 156
- Time zone: UTC+3 (TRT)

Çalköy is a village in the Kargı District of Çorum Province in Turkey. Its population is 156 (2022).
