= Gölköy, Kargı =

Village in Turkey

Gölköy
- Village
- Country: Turkey
- Province: Çorum
- District: Kargı
- Population (2022): 217
- Time zone: UTC+3 (TRT)

Gölköy is a village in the Kargı District of Çorum Province in Turkey. Its population is 217 (2022).
