= TED Karadeniz Ereğli Koleji =

Private school

TED Karadeniz Ereğli Koleji (TED Karadeniz Ereğli College) is a combined co-educational school including a primary (elementary) division and a high school division located in Karadeniz Ereğli near the Black Sea in Turkey. The school is a part of the Turkish Education Association (TED) schools.

== History ==
The college was opened in 1967 with the efforts of the locals, the state, and Erdemir officials. In 1974, the school saw its first graduates, and the elementary school division opened. In 1981, the high school division went under the control of the Ministry of National Education. In 1986, the high school division re-opened, and the event was named "The Second Birth". In 1993, the re-opened high school division saw its first graduates. In 1998, the elementary school division became the primary school division and this has brought the need for a new building, which was completed in 2004.
