= Kıran, Alaplı =

Kıran
- Village
- Location within Turkey
- Country: Turkey
- Province: Zonguldak
- District: Alaplı
- Population (2022): 221
- Time zone: UTC+3 (TRT)

Kıran is a village in Alaplı District, Zonguldak Province, Turkey. Its population is 221 (2022).
