= Baltacımehmetpaşa, Osmancık =

Village in Turkey

Baltacımehmetpaşa
- Village
- Location in Turkey
- Coordinates: 41.0357°N 34.7815°E
- Country: Turkey
- Province: Çorum
- District: Osmancık
- Population (2022): 157
- Time zone: UTC+3 (TRT)

Baltacımehmetpaşa is a village in the Osmancık District of Çorum Province in Turkey. Its population is 157 (2022).
