= Baba Burnu =

Cape Baba (Turkish:Baba Burnu) can refer to one of two capes in Turkey:

- Cape Baba, the westernmost point of Anatolia
- A cape near Karadeniz Eregli
