= Çobankaya, Kargı =

Village in Turkey

Çobankaya
- Village
- Country: Turkey
- Province: Çorum
- District: Kargı
- Population (2022): 94
- Time zone: UTC+3 (TRT)

Çobankaya is a village in the Kargı District of Çorum Province in Turkey. Its population is 94 (2022).
