= Güneşören, Osmancık =

Village in Turkey

Güneşören
- Village
- Location in Turkey
- Coordinates: 41°02′26″N 34°54′51″E
- Country: Turkey
- Province: Çorum
- District: Osmancık
- Population (2022): 149
- Time zone: UTC+3 (TRT)

Güneşören is a village in the Osmancık District of Çorum Province in Turkey. Its population is 149 (2022).
