= Hacıhamza, Kargı =

Village in Turkey

Hacıhamza
- Village
- Country: Turkey
- Province: Çorum
- District: Kargı
- Population (2022): 737
- Time zone: UTC+3 (TRT)

Hacıhamza Hacıhamza is a village in the Kargı District of Çorum Province in Turkey. Its population was 737 in 2022. Prior to the 2013 reorganisation, it was a town.belde
