= Akkise, Kargı =

Village in Turkey

Akkise
- Village
- Location in Turkey
- Coordinates: 41.1339°N 34.4515°E
- Country: Turkey
- Province: Çorum
- District: Kargı
- Population (2022): 293
- Time zone: UTC+3 (TRT)

Akkise (also: Akkese) is a village in the Kargı District of Çorum Province in Turkey. Its population is 293 (2022).
