= Fındıkköy, Osmancık =

Village in Turkey

Fındıkköy
- Village
- Country: Turkey
- Province: Çorum
- District: Osmancık
- Population (2022): 180
- Time zone: UTC+3 (TRT)

Fındıkköy is a village in the Osmancık District of Çorum Province in Turkey. Its population is 180 (2022).
