= Durhanlı, Alaplı =

Durhanlı
- Village
- Location within Turkey
- Coordinates: 41°10′N 31°26′E
- Country: Turkey
- Province: Zonguldak
- District: Alaplı
- Population (2022): 167
- Time zone: UTC+3 (TRT)

Durhanlı is a village in Alaplı District, Zonguldak Province, Turkey. Its population is 167 (2022).
