= Hanefi, Osmancık =

Village in Turkey

Hanefi
- Village
- Country: Turkey
- Province: Çorum
- District: Osmancık
- Population (2022): 47
- Time zone: UTC+3 (TRT)

Hanefi is a village in the Osmancık District of Çorum Province in Turkey. Its population is 47 (2022).
