= Arık, Kargı =

Village in Turkey

Arık
- Village
- Location in Turkey
- Coordinates: 41.1181°N 34.3370°E
- Country: Turkey
- Province: Çorum
- District: Kargı
- Population (2022): 130
- Time zone: UTC+3 (TRT)

Arık is a village in the Kargı District of Çorum Province in Turkey. Its population is 130 (2022).
