= Çampınar, Osmancık =

Village in Turkey

Çampınar
- Village
- Location in Turkey
- Coordinates: 40.9666°N 34.995°E
- Country: Turkey
- Province: Çorum
- District: Osmancık
- Population (2022): 490
- Time zone: UTC+3 (TRT)

Çampınar is a village in the Osmancık District of Çorum Province in Turkey. Its population is 490 (2022).
