= Örencik, Kargı =

Village in Turkey

Örencik
- Village
- Country: Turkey
- Province: Çorum
- District: Kargı
- Population (2022): 73
- Time zone: UTC+3 (TRT)

Örencik is a village in the Kargı District of Çorum Province in Turkey. Its population is 73 (2022).
