= Kargi, Hormozgan =

Kargi كرگي
- Village
- Location within Iran
- Coordinates: 25°53′53″N 58°27′10″E
- Country: Iran
- Province: Hormozgan
- County: Jask
- Bakhsh: Central
- Rural District: Gabrik

Population (2006)
  - Total: 19
- Time zone: UTC+3:30 (IRST)
  - Summer (DST): UTC+4:30 (IRDT)

Kargi (Persian: كرگي, also Romanized as Kargī; also known as Kargīn) is a village in Gabrik Rural District, in the Central District of Jask County, Hormozgan Province, Iran. At the 2006 census, its population was 19, in 6 families.
