= Karadeniz Ereğli =

Karadeniz Ereğli Ereğli
- Municipality
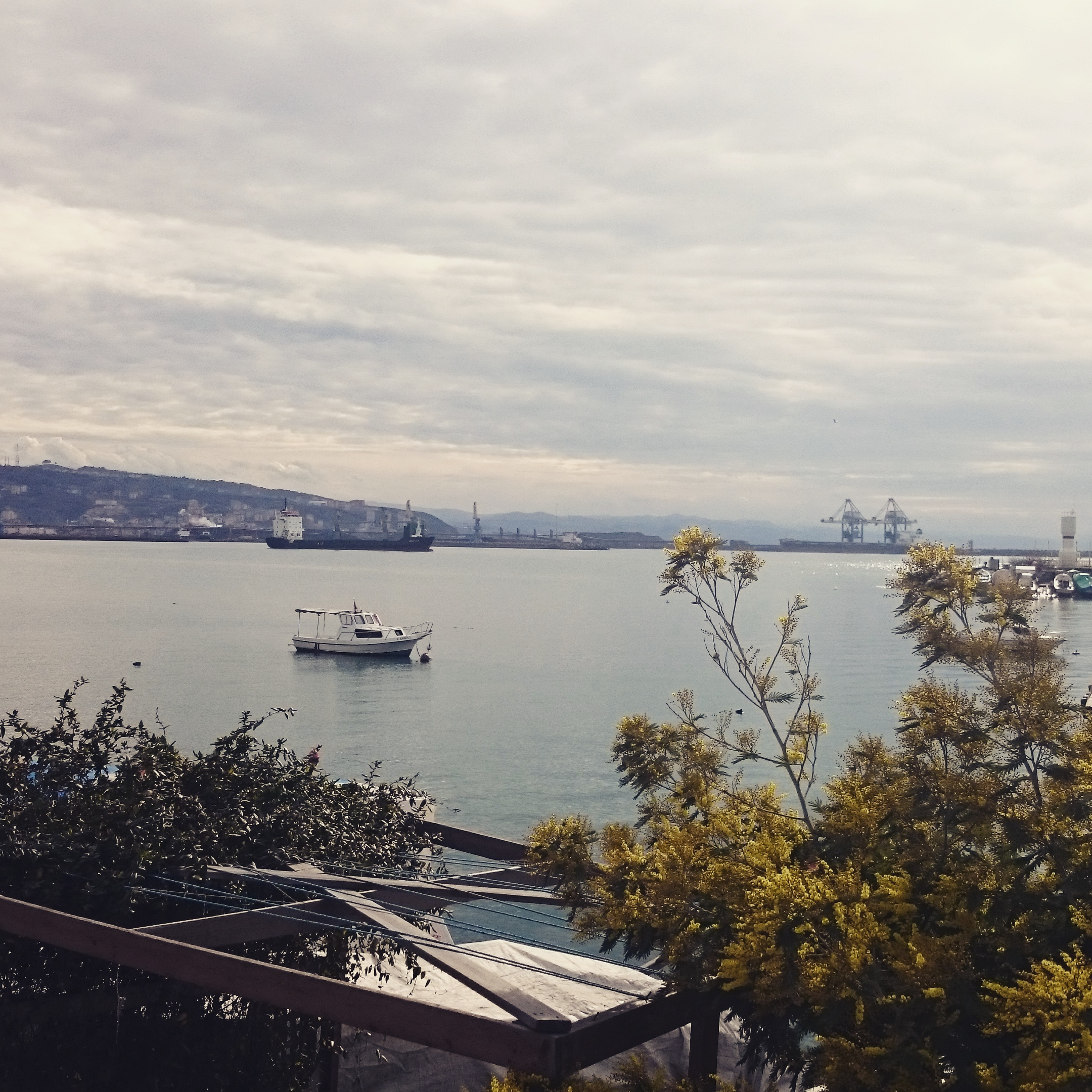
- Ereğli coast

- Logo

- Location within Turkey
- Coordinates: 41°16′45″N 31°25′15″E
- Country: Turkey
- Province: Zonguldak
- District: Ereğli

Government
  - Mayor: Halil Posbıyık (CHP)
- Elevation: 5 m (16 ft)
- Population (2022): 122,282
- Time zone: UTC+3 (TRT)
- Postal code: 67300
- Area code: 0372
- Climate: Cfb
- Website: www.kdzeregli.bel.tr

Karadeniz Ereğli (or Ereğli) is a city in Zonguldak Province of Turkey on the Black Sea shore. It is the seat of Ereğli District. Its population is 122,282 (2022). The mayor of the city is Halil Posbıyık. Mehmet Yapıcı is the District Governor of Ereğli.

== History ==
Karadeniz Ereğli was originally a Greek city in ancient times known as Heraclea Pontica after the Greek mythical hero Heracles. The Turkish name Karadeniz Ereğli or colloquially Karadeniz Ereğlisi means 'Ereğli at the Black Sea', which distinguishes it from other places called Ereğli such as Konya Ereğlisi and Marmara Ereğlisi.

It was founded as a Megarian colony, which soon subjugated the native Mariandynians and extended its power over a considerable territory. It was the birthplace of Heraclides Ponticus. According to Greek mythology, the cave guarded by the three-headed dog Cerberus is located near the town. For his final quest, Heracles is tasked with entering the cave and capturing Cerberus.

The prosperity of the city, rudely shaken by the Galatians and the Bithynians, was utterly destroyed in the Mithridatic Wars. Then, Heraclea Pontica was part of the (Eastern) Roman Empire for more than 1000 years. The Turks ravaged the area after the Battle of Mantzikert in 1071. David Komnenos, brother of the ruler of Trebizond Alexios I of Trebizond, took Heraclea Pontica in 1205 and made it capital of his domain, called Paphlagonia; he lost it in 1214 to Theodore I Laskaris, who made it a major frontier bulwark. The Genoese had a colony there after 1261. When the Turks conquered Paphlagonia in 1360, the Genoese bought the city from the weakening Byzantine Empire. Heraclea developed as a trading centre of the Genoese, who settled there in large numbers. A ruined citadel on a height overlooking the town is a remnant of this period. The Italian name of the city was Pontarachia. The Genoese held the city until the Ottomans captured it after 1453.

In the late 19th and early 20th century, Karadeniz Ereğli was part of the Kastamonu Vilayet of the Ottoman Empire.

== Economy ==
Modern Ereğli is the home of Erdemir, an important steel plant of Turkey. It has a large natural harbour, located in the lee of Baba Burnu and therefore one of the few geographically attractive places for a harbour on the western Black Sea coast of Turkey.

== Transport ==
The city does not have an airport (Erdemir has a small private field) or rail station, but can be reached by automobile or bus from Ankara, Istanbul and other places.

== Sports ==
Ereğli is an active spot in women's football. Karadeniz Ereğli Belediyespor is currently competing in National Women's Football League. Furthermore, Karadeniz Ereğli Spor won Girls' U-15 Turkey Championship in 2011. Also, local men's football clubs of Ereğli compete in amateur leagues.

In 2000s, Erdemirspor had several successful professional sport teams. Men's volleyball team won three Turkish Men's Volleyball League championship titles (2001-02, 2003-04, and 2004-05), but was withdrawn from the league in 2007. Men's basketball team competed in Men's Basketball Super League for 7 seasons (2004-06, 2008-13), until Erdemir disestablished the team in 2013. It also won two championship titles in the lower basketball league. Besides, women's basketball team competed in the Woman's Basketball League in 2000s.

Chess is also a popular sport in Ereğli. There are two chess clubs in the city, and Ereğli hosts around 10 local chess tournaments each year.

== See also ==
- Gülüç
- Alaplı
- Akçakoca
- Alemdar (ship)
- Baba Burnu (disambiguation)
- Ereğli TED Koleji
