= Avşar, Kargı =

Village in Turkey

Avşar
- Village
- Location in Turkey
- Coordinates: 41.1034°N 34.4352°E
- Country: Turkey
- Province: Çorum
- District: Kargı
- Population (2022): 85
- Time zone: UTC+3 (TRT)

Avşar is a village in the Kargı District of Çorum Province in Turkey. Its population is 85 (2022).
