= Aşağızeytin, Osmancık =

Village in Turkey

Aşağızeytin
- Village
- Location in Turkey
- Coordinates: 41°10′N 34°49′E
- Country: Turkey
- Province: Çorum
- District: Osmancık
- Population (2022): 103
- Time zone: UTC+3 (TRT)

Aşağızeytin is a village in the Osmancık District of Çorum Province in Turkey. Its population is 103 (2022).
