= Kasımlı, Alaplı =

Kasımlı
- Village
- Location within Turkey
- Country: Turkey
- Province: Zonguldak
- District: Alaplı
- Population (2022): 694
- Time zone: UTC+3 (TRT)

Kasımlı is a village in Alaplı District, Zonguldak Province, Turkey. Its population is 694 (2022).
