= Çengelli, Alaplı =

Çengelli
- Village
- Location within Turkey
- Coordinates: 41.1850°N 31.4425°E
- Country: Turkey
- Province: Zonguldak
- District: Alaplı
- Population (2022): 109
- Time zone: UTC+3 (TRT)

Çengelli is a village in Alaplı District, Zonguldak Province, Turkey. Its population is 109 (2022).
