= Hacıhasan, Alaplı =

Hacıhasan
- Village
- Location within Turkey
- Country: Turkey
- Province: Zonguldak
- District: Alaplı
- Population (2022): 476
- Time zone: UTC+3 (TRT)

Hacıhasan is a village in Alaplı District, Zonguldak Province, Turkey. Its population is 476 (2022).
