= Alaplı District =

District of Zonguldak Province, Turkey

- District
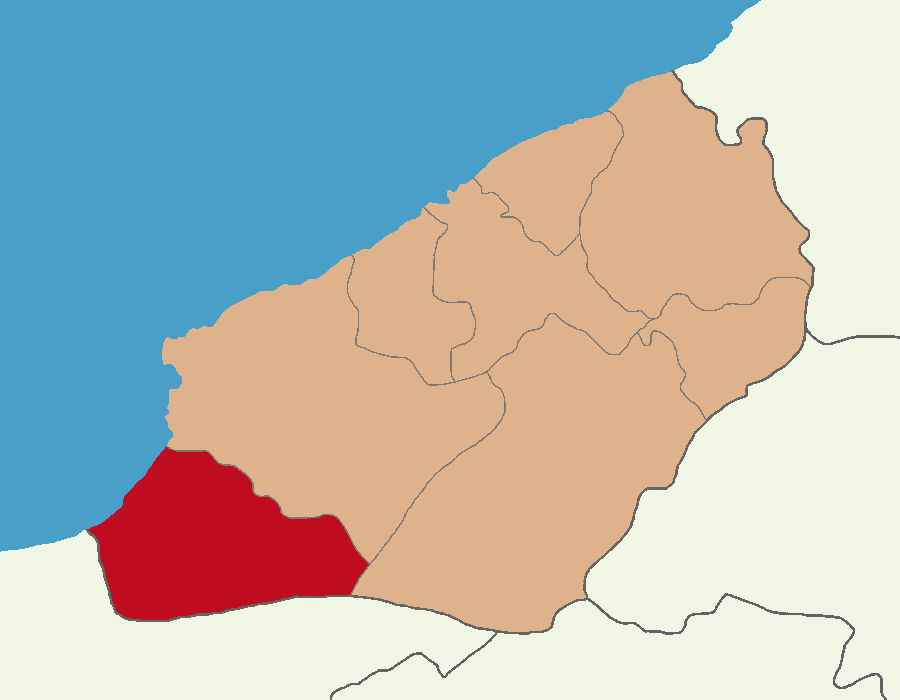
- Map showing Alaplı District in Zonguldak Province

- Location within Turkey
- Coordinates: 41°08′N 31°28′E
- Country: Turkey
- Province: Zonguldak
- Seat: Alaplı

Government
  - Kaymakam: Vedat Yılmaz
- Area: 383 km^{2} (148 sq mi)
- Population (2022): 42,720
  - Density: 112/km^{2} (289/sq mi)
- Time zone: UTC+3 (TRT)
- Website: www.alapli.gov.tr

Alaplı District is a district of the Zonguldak Province of Turkey. Its seat is the town of Alaplı. Its area is 383 km^{2}, and its population is 42,720 (2022).

== Composition ==
There are two municipalities in Alaplı District:

- Alaplı
- Gümeli

There are 51 villages in Alaplı District:

- Ahatlı
- Ahiler
- Alaplıbölücek
- Alaplıkocaali
- Alaplıömerli
- Alaplıortacı
- Alioğlu
- Aşağıdağ
- Aşağıtekke
- Aydınyayla
- Bektaşlı
- Belen
- Büyüktekke
- Çamcılar
- Çamlıbel
- Canbazlı
- Çatak
- Çayköy
- Çengelli
- Çiçekli
- Demirciler
- Doğancılar
- Durhanlı
- Fındıklı
- Gökhasan
- Gürpınar
- Hacıhasan
- Hallı
- Hasanlı
- Hüseyinli
- İsafakılı
- Kabalar
- Kasımlı
- Kılçak
- Kıran
- Kocaman
- Küçükkaymaz
- Küçüktekke
- Kürkükler
- Mollabey
- Musabeyli
- Okçular
- Onurlu
- Osmanlı
- Sabırlı
- Sarıkadı
- Sofullu
- Yedigelli
- Yenidoğanlar
- Yeniköy
- Yeşilyurt
