= Tekmen, Osmancık =

Village in Turkey

Tekmen
- Village
- Tekmen village center

- Location within Turkey
- Coordinates: 41°01′40″N 34°53′0″E
- Country: Turkey
- Province: Çorum
- District: Osmancık
- Elevation: 801 m (2,628 ft)
- Population (2022): 190
- Time zone: UTC+3 (TRT)
- Postal code: 19500
- Area code: 0364
- Climate: Cfb

Tekmen is a village in the Black Sea Region of Turkey, in Osmancık District of Çorum Province. Its population is 190 (2022). Though it is in the Black Sea Region, it carries typical properties of villages of the Central Anatolia Region. The village economy is based on agriculture and animal husbandry. At the beginning of the 1970s, the Tekmen people began to emigrate from the village to the surrounding cities. Since then, the population of Tekmenians has decreased by around 3,000.

The village consists of five rural districts: Central Tekmen, Karataş, Yukarısaltuk, Aşağısaltuk, and Bağlar. Each district consists of specific families. For example, only the Soruklu family live in Karataş, and in Bağlar only the Hacılars and Hacıyusufs.

== Education ==
Hüseyin Gülburun was appointed as a teacher to the village in 1945. He taught reading and writing to prepare students for primary school. Many of his former students have become civil servants. The second teacher to come to the village was Mehmet Kazanan. The Tekmen primary school is currently closed, and the students go to school in Osmancık.

Hasanoğlan Village Institute students from Tekmen

1983

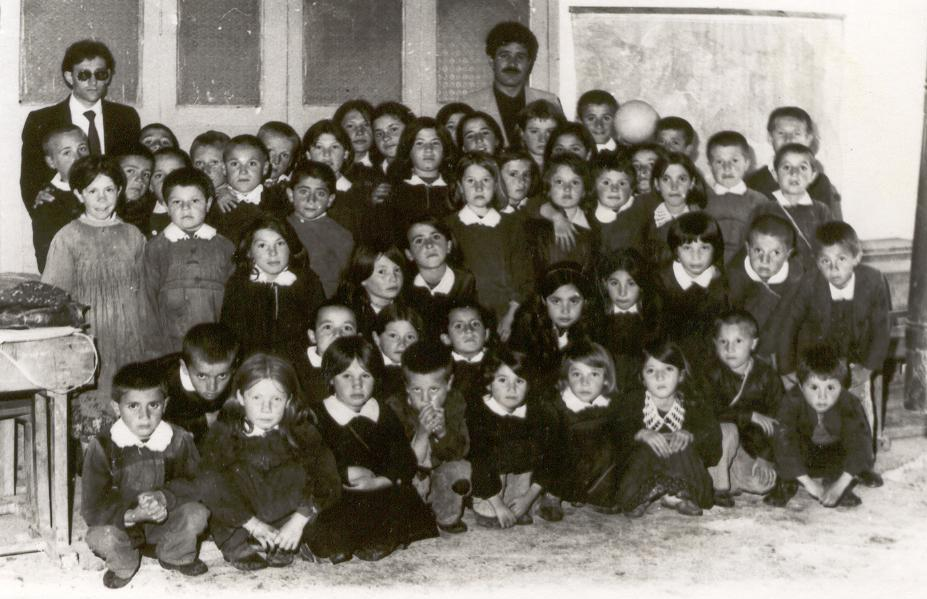
1987

Necmettin Parlar and Servet Köroğlu with students in 1992

2005

== Economy ==
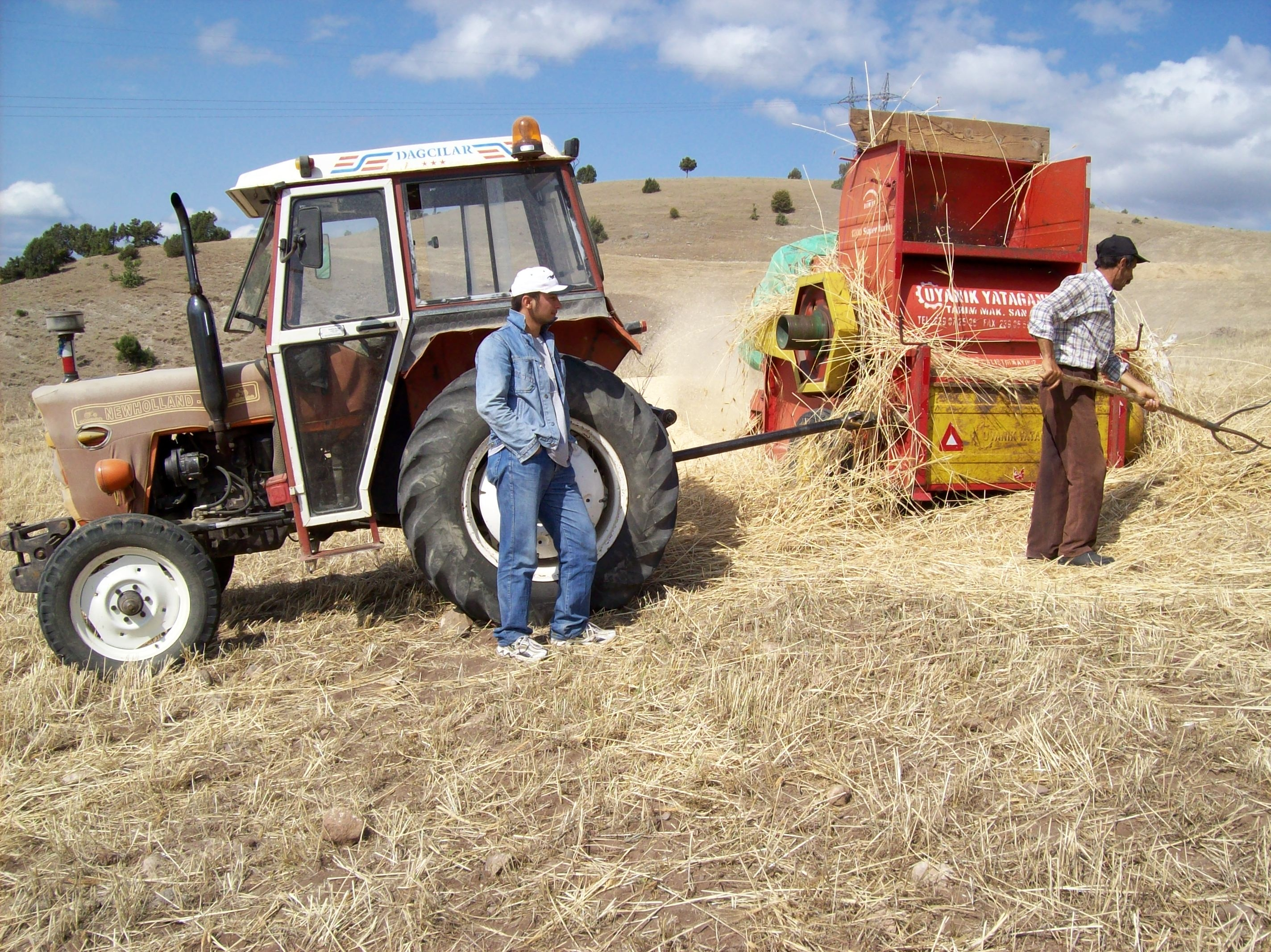
Harvesting wheat

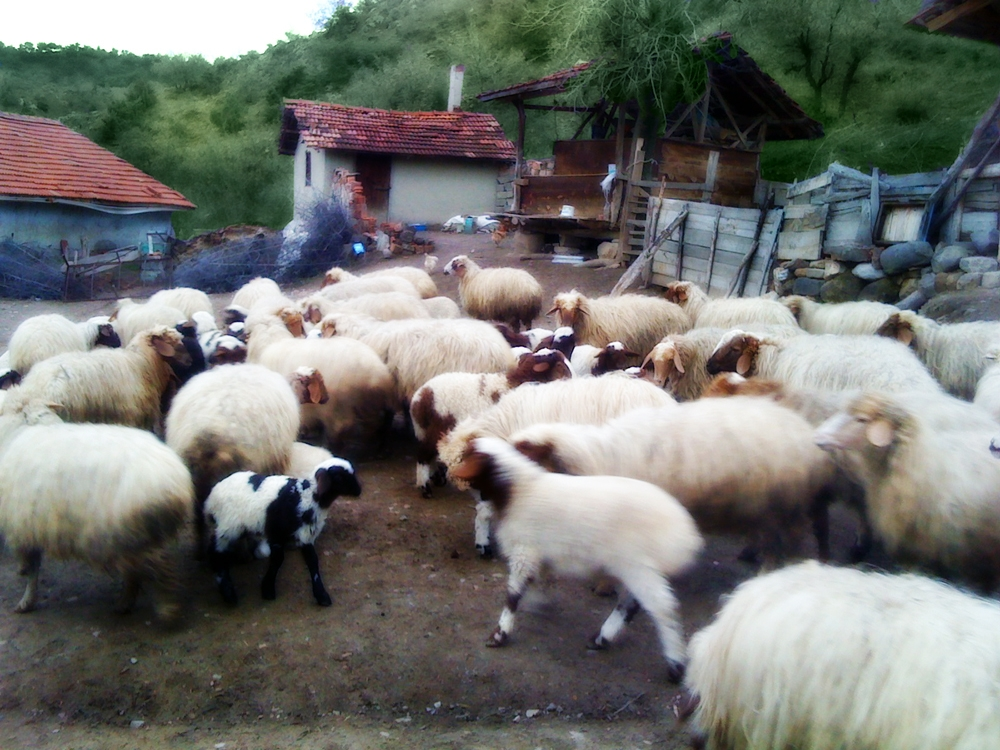
Sheep in Tekmen

The economy of Tekmen is based on cattle breeding and agriculture. Sheep and goats are also raised. Barley, wheat, oats, and rye are the cereal crops produced, along with lentils, chickpeas, and white beans. There is also a tile factory in the village.

== Politics ==
Election results in Tekmen since 1950:

- 1950 – Democrat Party
- 1954 – Democrat Party
- 1957 – Republican People's Party
- 1961 – Unknown
- 1965 – Justice Party
- 1969 – Justice Party
- 1973 – National Salvation Party
- 1977 – Republican People's Party
- 1983 – Motherland Party
- 1987 – Republican People's Party
- 1991 – True Path Party
- 1995 – Democratic Left Party
- 1999 – Democratic Left Party
- 2002 – Republican People's Party
- 2007 – Justice and Development Party

== Tekmen Association ==
Tekmen people began to emigrate from the village at the beginning of the 1970s to cities both for education and to earn a living. The population has decreased by some 3,000 people, who periodically return to visit their grandfathers and grandmothers.

In late 2007, the village founded an association named "Tekmen Association of Regional Development, Solidarity, Cooperation, Education, Culture, Youth and Sport". The goals of the association are to develop the region and the community socially, economically, to protect the culture, to make the area a better place to live, to enhance solidarity and cooperation between natives and others, to assure people's right to live freely, to perform necessary social, cultural, economic, and sportive studies for youth, and to prepare projects based on these goals.

== Upland Festival ==
Every year at the end of July, the Upland Festival is celebrated in Tekmen Village. Tekmenians come together at an upland of the village and enjoy entertainment for seven days. People come from all over Turkey.

The festival hosts traditional wrestling, folk dances, Halay, local games, mini competitions, a football match, local or traditional foods, local singers, the musical instrument Saz, and other activities.
