= Sinanözü, Kargı =

Village in Turkey

Sinanözü
- Village
- Location in Turkey
- Coordinates: 41°12′N 34°50′E
- Country: Turkey
- Province: Çorum
- District: Kargı
- Population (2022): 82
- Time zone: UTC+3 (TRT)

Sinanözü is a village in the Kargı District of Çorum Province in Turkey. Its population is 82 (2022).
