= Alioğlu, Alaplı =

Alioğlu
- Village
- Location within Turkey
- Coordinates: 41.1722°N 31.4773°E
- Country: Turkey
- Province: Zonguldak
- District: Alaplı
- Population (2022): 529
- Time zone: UTC+3 (TRT)

Alioğlu is a village in Alaplı District, Zonguldak Province, Turkey. Its population is 529 (2022).
