= Uzunyurt, Kargı =

Village in Turkey

Uzunyurt
- Village
- Location in Turkey
- Coordinates: 41°09′23″N 34°31′54″E
- Country: Turkey
- Province: Çorum
- District: Kargı
- Population (2022): 213
- Time zone: UTC+3 (TRT)

Uzunyurt is a village in the Kargı District of Çorum Province in Turkey. Its population is 213 (2022).
