= Köprübaşı, Kargı =

Village in Turkey

Köprübaşı
- Village
- Country: Turkey
- Province: Çorum
- District: Kargı
- Population (2022): 130
- Time zone: UTC+3 (TRT)

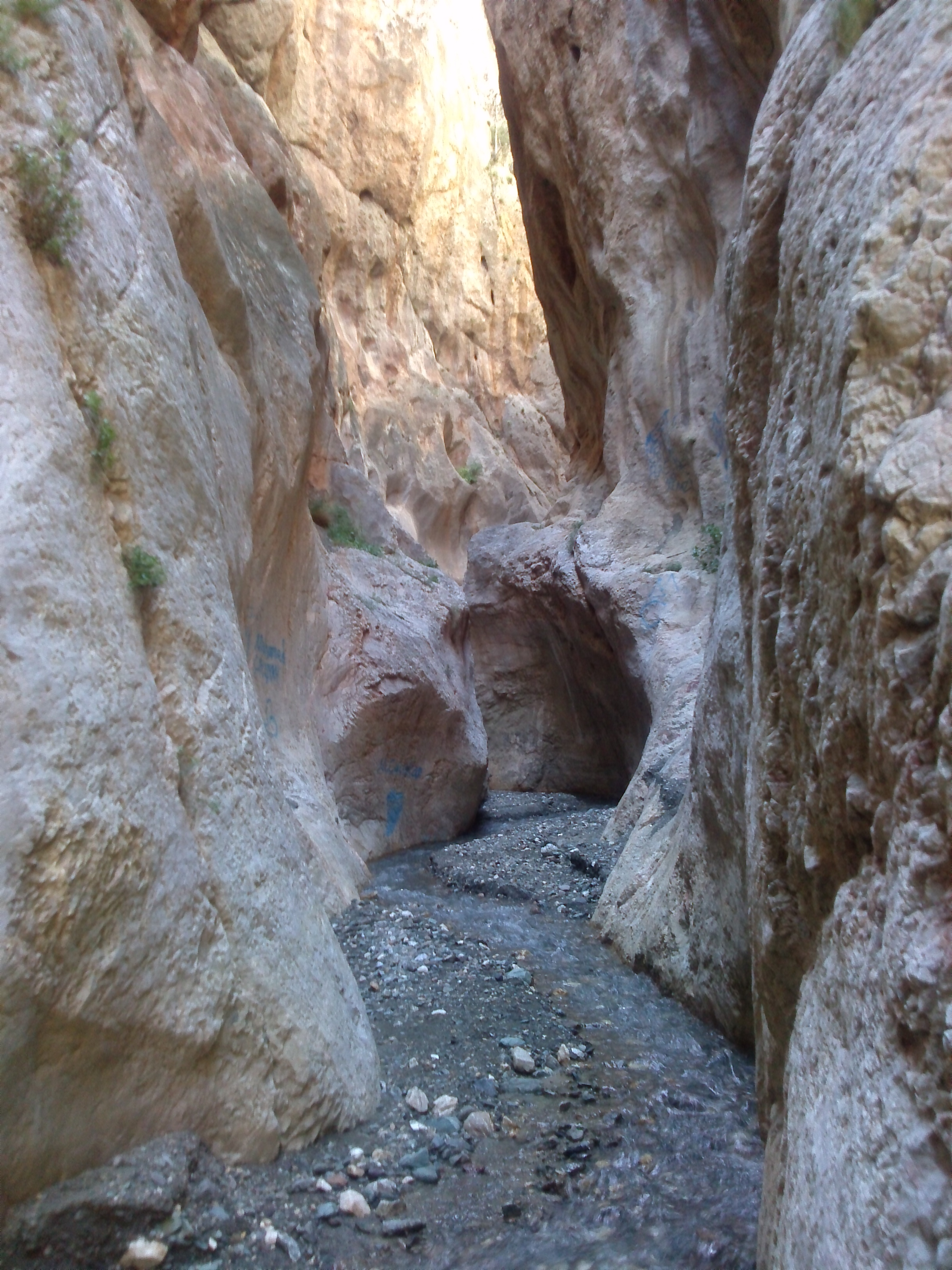
Canyon in Köprübaşı

Köprübaşı is a village in the Kargı District of Çorum Province in Turkey. Its population is 130 (2022).
