= Maksutlu, Kargı =

Village in Turkey

Maksutlu
- Village
- Country: Turkey
- Province: Çorum
- District: Kargı
- Population (2022): 401
- Time zone: UTC+3 (TRT)

Maksutlu is a village in the Kargı District of Çorum Province in Turkey. Its population is 401 (2022).
