= Çakırlar, Kargı =

Village in Turkey

Çakırlar
- Village
- Location in Turkey
- Coordinates: 41.1322°N 34.4255°E
- Country: Turkey
- Province: Çorum
- District: Kargı
- Population (2022): 213
- Time zone: UTC+3 (TRT)

Çakırlar is a village in the Kargı District of Çorum Province in Turkey. Its population is 213 (2022).
