= Kabakçı, Kargı =

Village in Turkey

Kabakçı
- Village
- Location in Turkey
- Coordinates: 41°09′N 34°20′E
- Country: Turkey
- Province: Çorum
- District: Kargı
- Population (2022): 54
- Time zone: UTC+3 (TRT)

Kabakçı is a village in the Kargı District of Çorum Province in Turkey. Its population is 54 (2022).
