= Öbektaş, Osmancık =

Village in Turkey

Öbektaş
- Village
- Location in Turkey
- Coordinates: 41°2′30″N 34°58′8″E
- Country: Turkey
- Province: Çorum
- District: Osmancık
- Population (2022): 1,302
- Time zone: UTC+3 (TRT)

Öbektaş is a village in the Osmancık District of Çorum Province in Turkey. Its population is 1,302 (2022).
