= Kargi, Estonia =

Village in Estonia

Coordinates: 58°01′N 22°05′E

Kargi
- Village
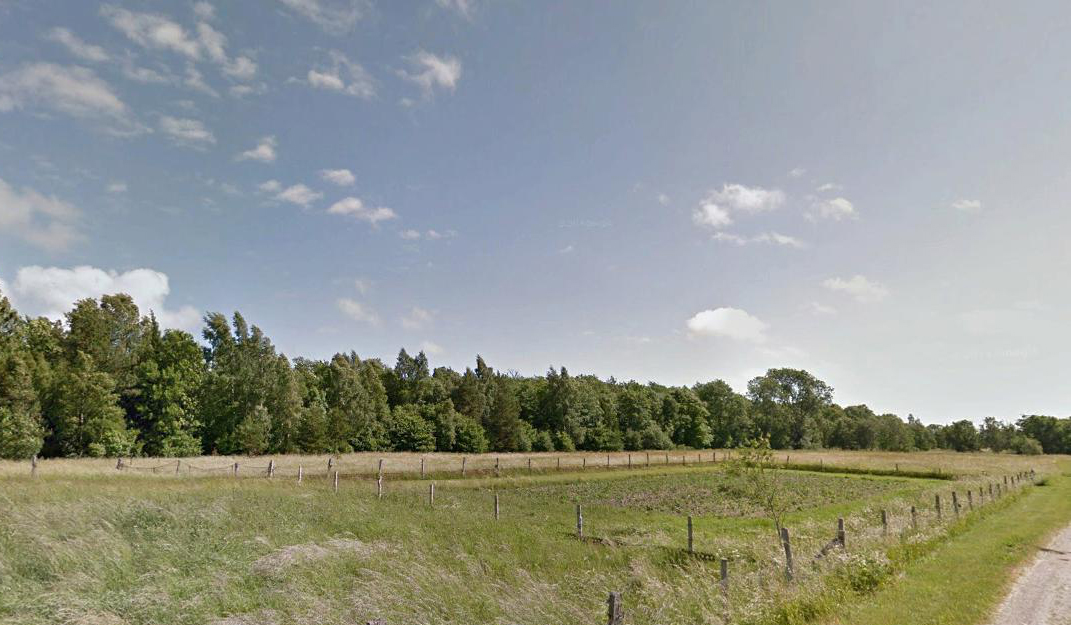
- Interactive map of Kargi
- Country: Estonia
- County: Saare
- Parish: Saaremaa
- Time zone: UTC+2 (EET)
  - Summer (DST): UTC+3 (EEST)

Kargi is a village in Saaremaa Parish, Saare County in western Estonia.
