= Aydınyayla, Alaplı =

Aydınyayla
- Village
- Location within Turkey
- Coordinates: 41.1247°N 31.5467°E
- Country: Turkey
- Province: Zonguldak
- District: Alaplı
- Population (2022): 685
- Time zone: UTC+3 (TRT)

Aydınyayla is a village in Alaplı District, Zonguldak Province, Turkey. Its population is 685 (2022).
