= Karge =

Karge may refer to:

- 4822 Karge, an asteroid named after Orville B. Karge (1919–1990)
- Joseph Kargé (1823–1892), a military officer and educator
- Manfred Karge (born 1938), a German dramatist
