= Cihadiye, Kargı =

Village in Turkey

Cihadiye
- Village
- Location in Turkey
- Coordinates: 41.2541°N 34.5994°E
- Country: Turkey
- Province: Çorum
- District: Kargı
- Population (2022): 180
- Time zone: UTC+3 (TRT)

Cihadiye is a village in the Kargı District of Çorum Province in Turkey. Its population is 180 (2022).
