= Yukarızeytin, Osmancık =

Village in Turkey

Yukarızeytin
- Village
- Location in Turkey
- Coordinates: 41°10′N 34°50′E
- Country: Turkey
- Province: Çorum
- District: Osmancık
- Population (2022): 309
- Time zone: UTC+3 (TRT)

Yukarızeytin is a village in the Osmancık District of Çorum Province in Turkey. Its population is 309 (2022).
