= Aşıkbükü, Osmancık =

Village in Turkey

Aşıkbükü
- Village
- Location in Turkey
- Coordinates: 41°07′N 34°46′E
- Country: Turkey
- Province: Çorum
- District: Osmancık
- Population (2022): 176
- Time zone: UTC+3 (TRT)

Aşıkbükü is a village in the Osmancık District of Çorum Province in Turkey. Its population is 176 (2022).
