= Musabeyli, Alaplı =

Musabeyli
- Village
- Location within Turkey
- Country: Turkey
- Province: Zonguldak
- District: Alaplı
- Population (2022): 254
- Time zone: UTC+3 (TRT)
- Postal code: 67852

Musabeyli is a village in Alaplı District, Zonguldak Province, Turkey. Its population is 254 (2022). The post code is 67852.
