= Kuz, Osmancık =

Village in Turkey

Kuz
- Village
- Location in Turkey
- Coordinates: 41°04′25″N 34°43′50″E
- Country: Turkey
- Province: Çorum
- District: Osmancık
- Population (2022): 104
- Time zone: UTC+3 (TRT)

Kuz (formerly: Kuzalibey) is a village in the Osmancık District of Çorum Province in Turkey. Its population is 104 (2022).
