= Bağözü, Kargı =

Village in Turkey

Bağözü
- Village
- Location in Turkey
- Coordinates: 41.1487°N 34.7106°E
- Country: Turkey
- Province: Çorum
- District: Kargı
- Population (2022): 129
- Time zone: UTC+3 (TRT)

Bağözü is a village in the Kargı District of Çorum Province in Turkey. Its population is 129 (2022).

== History ==
Bağözü Village is a timar village located in the Kargı District of the Çankırı Sanjak of the Ottoman Empire. The village has retained the same name since 1521. According to the tax register of the Çankırı Sanjak of the Ottoman Empire, the total population of the village was recorded as 24 households in the year 1521. However, in 1579, this population was updated to 27 households. Additionally, in the year 1579, the income of the village was stated as 3300 akçe.
