= Kargı Dam =

Dam in Eskişehir, Turkey

- Interactive map of Kargı Dam
- Location: Turkey
- Construction began: 2000
- Opening date: 2009

Dam and spillways
- Impounds: Sakarya River
- Height: 84 m (276 ft)

Reservoir
- Total capacity: 45,000,000 m^{3} (36,482 acre⋅ft)

Power Station
- Installed capacity: 194 MW
- Annual generation: 245 GWh

The Kargı Dam is a rock-fill embankment dam on the Sakarya River in Eskişehir Province, Turkey. The development was backed by the Turkish State Hydraulic Works. The primary purpose of the dam is hydroelectric power generation and it supports a 194 MW power station. In 2022, the power generation of the dam was 133,838,171 kWh.

== See also ==
- List of dams and reservoirs in Turkey
