= Kargı, Osmancık =

Village in Turkey

Kargı
- Village
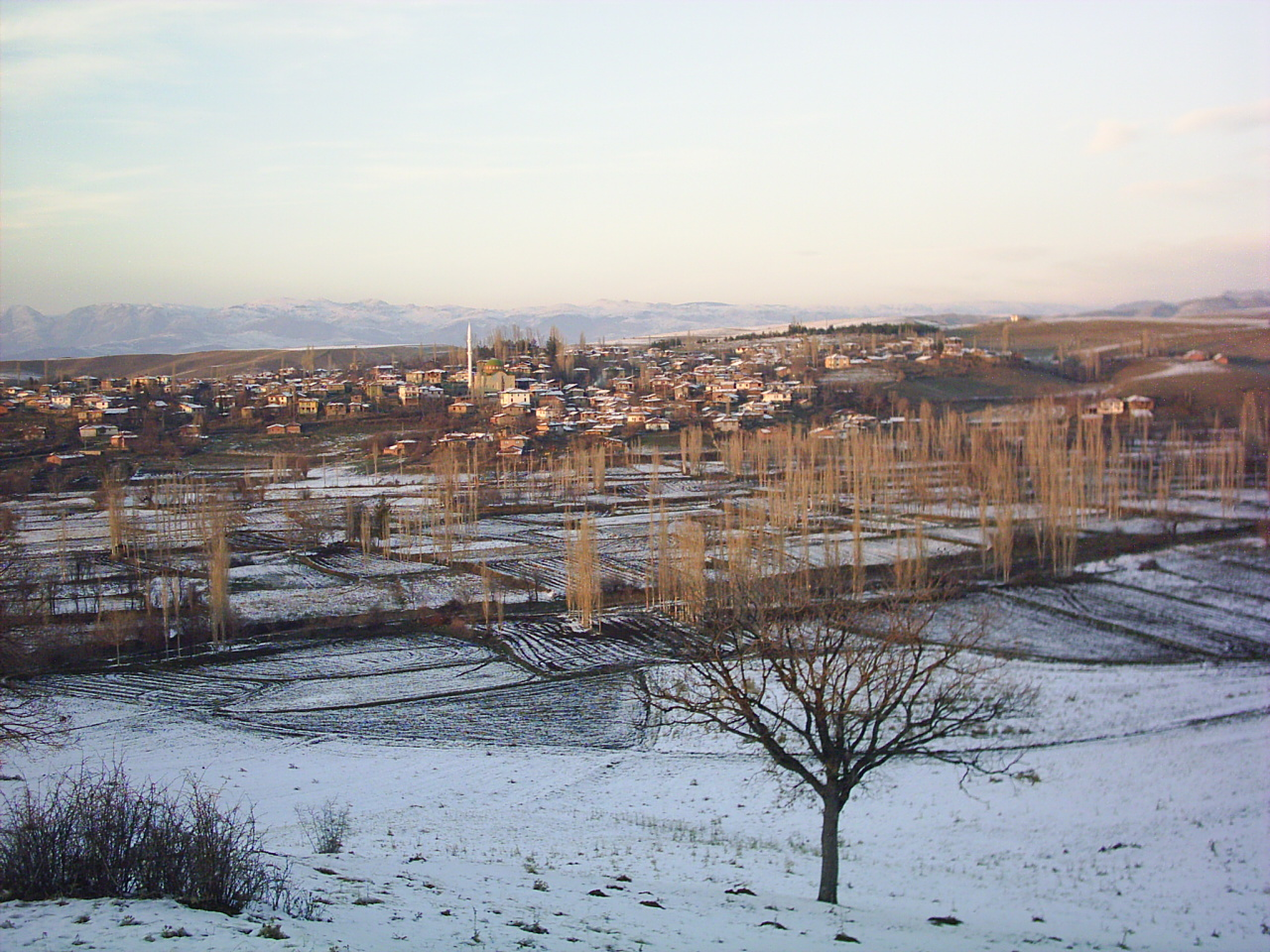

- Location within Turkey
- Country: Turkey
- Province: Çorum
- District: Osmancık
- Population (2022): 256
- Time zone: UTC+3 (TRT)

Kargı is a village in the Osmancık District of Çorum Province in Turkey. Its population is 256 (2022).
