= Khargi =

Khargi خرگي
- Village
- Location within Iran
- Coordinates: 27°12′22″N 56°44′21″E
- Country: Iran
- Province: Hormozgan
- County: Bandar Abbas
- Bakhsh: Takht
- Rural District: Shamil

Population (2006)
  - Total: 273
- Time zone: UTC+3:30 (IRST)
  - Summer (DST): UTC+4:30 (IRDT)

Khargi (Persian: خرگي, also Romanized as Khargī) is a village in Shamil Rural District, Takht District, Bandar Abbas County, Hormozgan Province, Iran. At the 2006 census, its population was 273, in 65 families.
