= Tulum cheese =

Turkish goat cheese

Tulum
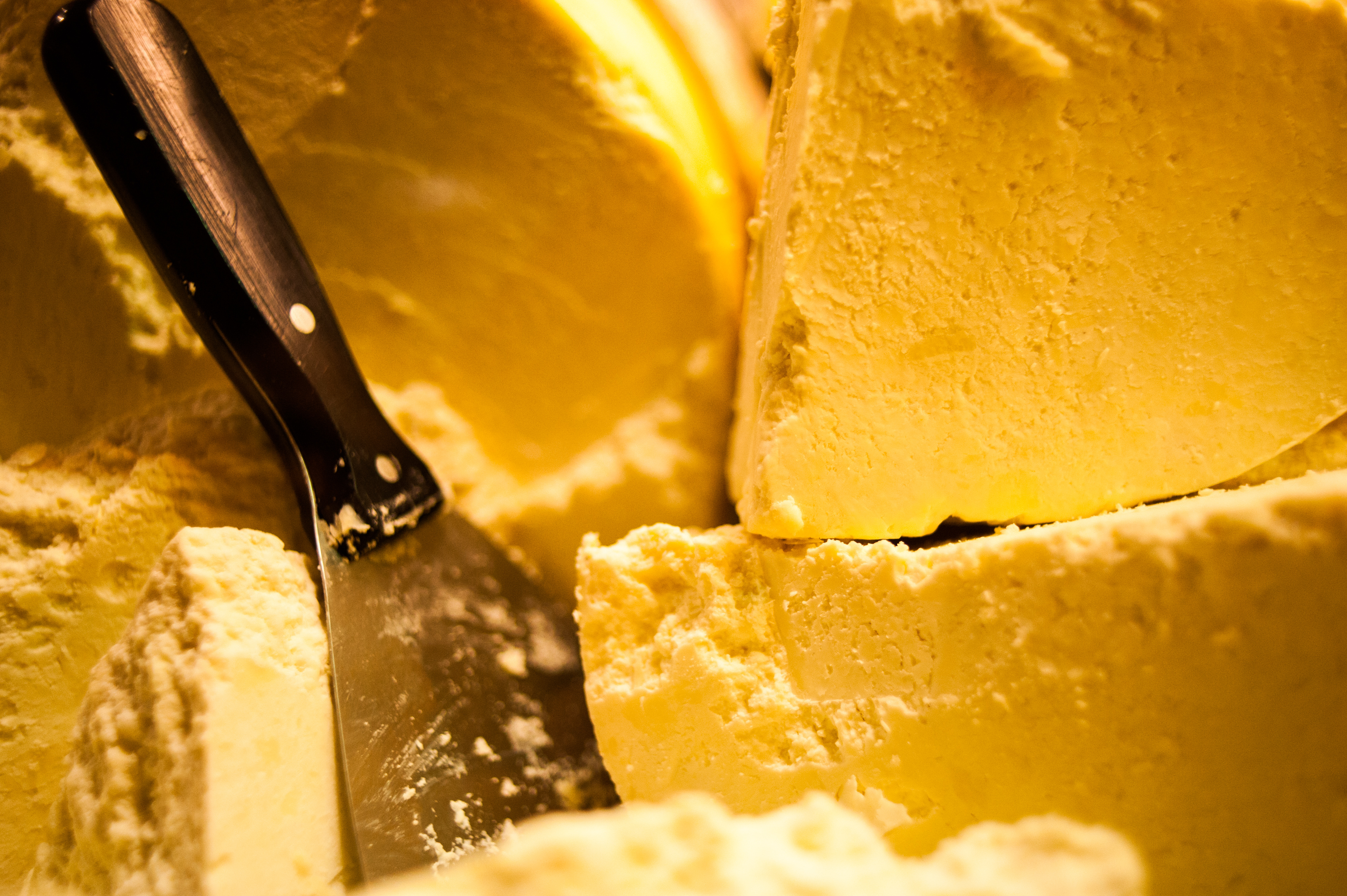
- Country of origin: Turkey
- Region, town: Erzincan, İzmir, Elazığ, Divle, Çini, Kargı
- Region: Eastern Anatolia, Aegean, Central Anatolia, Mediterranean, Black Sea
- Source of milk: Goats
- Pasteurized: No
- Texture: Soft-ripened
- Aging time: 6 months (conventional)

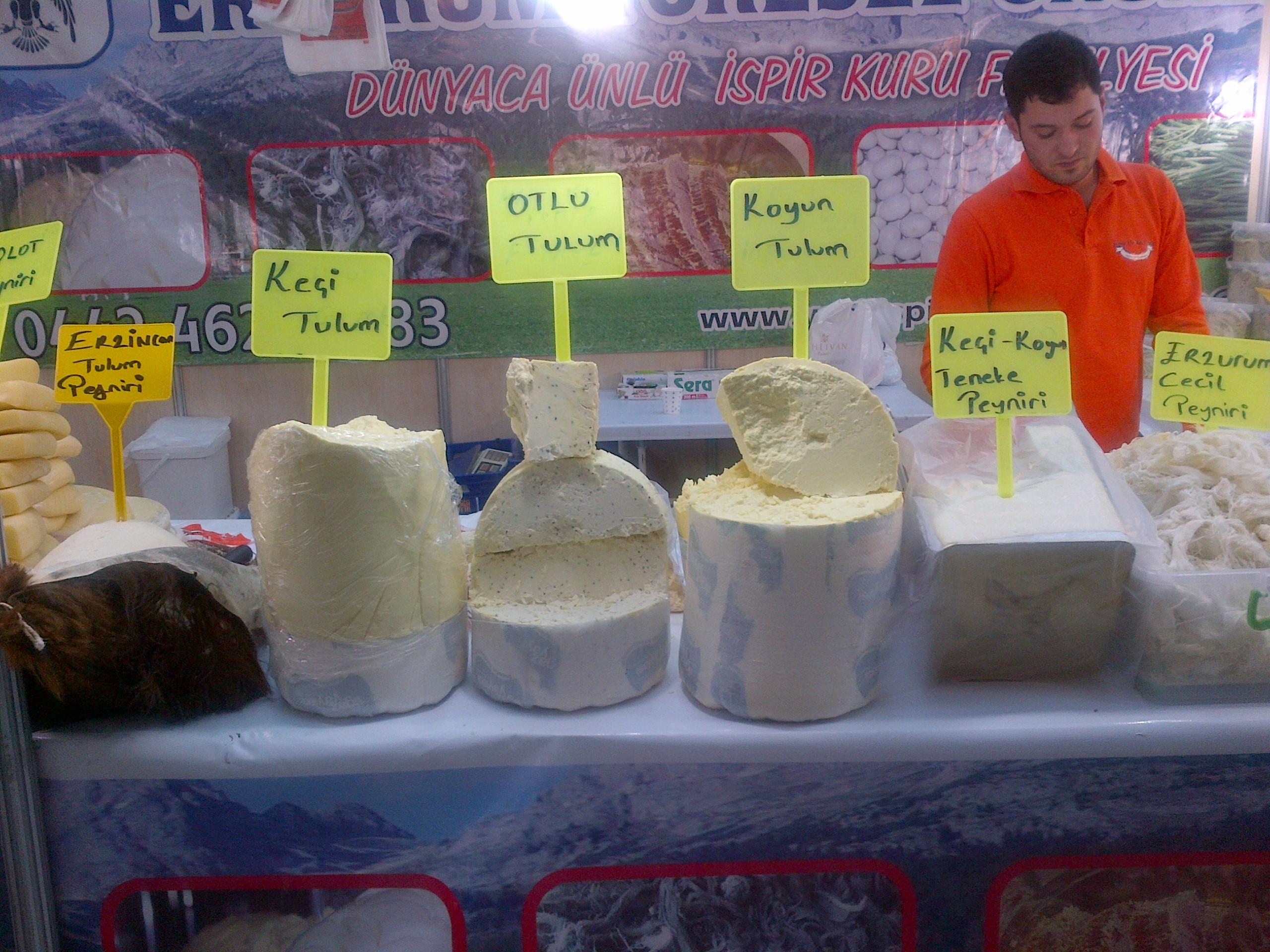
Varieties of tulum, center "Otlu tulum peyniri", or Tulum with herbs, in Ankara

Tulum cheese (Turkish: tulum peyniri) is a traditional Turkish goat's milk cheese ripened in a goatskin casing, called tulum in Turkish.

== Cheesemaking ==
=== Conventional ===
Tulum cheese is made by heating high-fat goat's milk to a temperature of 30 °C (86 °F) and subsequently souring it through addition a starter culture. The milk then starts to coagulate. After about an hour, the milk is entirely converted into curds and whey.

The curd is drained and repeatedly cut by special knives into smaller cubes allowing the whey to drain. The temperature is kept constant throughout this process. The curds are collected in hemp cheesecloth, which have been cleaned, cooled and wetted before use. The bundles of curd are then hung for eight hours to allow them to drain and cure. The curds in the cheesecloth are then pressed into a form with a wooden cover. A weight is placed on the cover for several hours allowing more whey to be expressed. The curd is subsequently cut in pieces the size of bar of soap and immersed in brine. The pieces are then arranged on a counter, and cured for 24 hours.

The next day, the curds are crushed by hand, kneaded with raw goat's milk and then tightly stuffed into a goatskin casing, which has been cleaned and salted. The curd filling is topped with salt, and the casing's opening is fastened with a cord. The goatskin casing is stored in a cool place such as a cave or cellar at temperatures of 10 to 12 °C (50 to 54 °F) for about six months to ripen. The casing may be perforated at its sides to allow any residual whey to drain.

=== Commercial ===
Contrary to homemade cheese, commercial tulum is made of goat's milk with a lower fat content, and kneaded with water buffalo or sheep milk, ripened in cowskin casings, and produced in an accelerated process that makes it, however, less durable. Its flavor is slightly different and it may become moldy. Ripening of commercially produced tulum is commonly also carried out in plastic barrels.

== Tulum cheese by location ==
Tulum cheese is differentiated in Turkey by location. Cheese originating from different parts of the country differs in taste due to variation in production techniques. The most notable tulum cheeses are:

Tulum cheese of Erzincan

Made in Erzincan Province in Eastern Anatolia region.

Tulum cheese of İzmir

The tulum cheese of İzmir differs from other regional tulum cheese varieties in processing and characteristic. Produced in Aegean Region provinces like İzmir, Aydın, Manisa, Muğla and Balıkesir, it is made of raw milk heated to 60–65 °C (140–149 °F), and cooled immediately down to acidifying temperature. Curds are brined in 16-percentage solution and cured for one night. The curd is filled then in cans with 12-percentage solution of brine for ripening.

Tulum cheese of Divle

Divle is a village in the Ayrancı district of Karaman Province in Central Anatolia Region.

Tulum cheese of Çimi

Çimi is a village in the Akseki district of Antalya Province in Mediterranean Region.

Tulum cheese of Kargı

Produced in Kargı of Çorum province in Black Sea Region, this variety comes closest to conventional tulum cheese. The annual production of 25 tons is mostly consumed in Çorum and its neighbouring provinces Kastamonu, Samsun and Ankara.

== See also ==
- Brined cheese – Cheese that is matured in brine
- List of cheeses
- List of goat milk cheeses – Cultured products of milk of domestic goats
