= Saraycık, Kargı =

Village in Turkey

Saraycık
- Village
- Location in Turkey
- Coordinates: 41.1672°N 34.7930°E
- Country: Turkey
- Province: Çorum
- District: Kargı
- Population (2022): 127
- Time zone: UTC+3 (TRT)

Saraycık is a village in the Kargı District of Çorum Province in Turkey. Its population was 127 (2022).
