= Onurlu, Alaplı =

Onurlu
- Village
- Location within Turkey
- Coordinates: 41.1503°N 31.3917°E
- Country: Turkey
- Province: Zonguldak
- District: Alaplı
- Population (2022): 249
- Time zone: UTC+3 (TRT)

Onurlu is a village in Alaplı District, Zonguldak Province, Turkey. Its population is 249 (2022).
