= Aydınköy, Osmancık =

Village in Turkey

Aydınköy
- Village
- Location within Turkey
- Coordinates: 41°14′07″N 34°53′21″E
- Country: Turkey
- Province: Çorum
- District: Osmancık
- Population (2022): 153
- Time zone: UTC+3 (TRT)

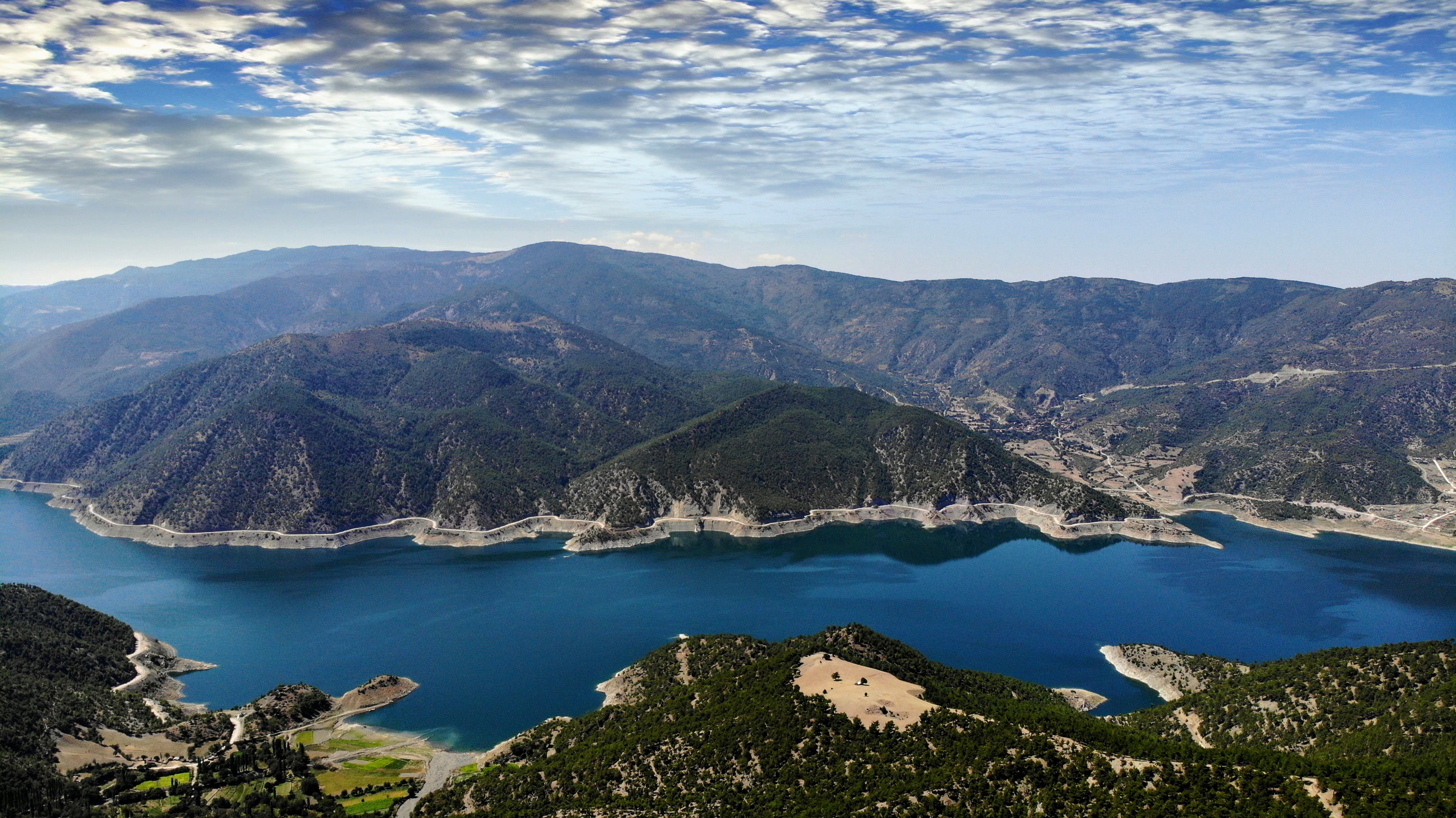

Aydınköy is a village in the Osmancık District of Çorum Province in Turkey. Its population is 153 (2022).
