= Karaboya, Kargı =

Village in Turkey

Karaboya
- Village
- Location in Turkey
- Coordinates: 41°08′N 34°32′E
- Country: Turkey
- Province: Çorum
- District: Kargı
- Population (2022): 55
- Time zone: UTC+3 (TRT)

Karaboya is a village in the Kargı District of Çorum Province in Turkey. Its population is 55 (2022).
