= Kargı, Çorum =

Kargı
- Municipality
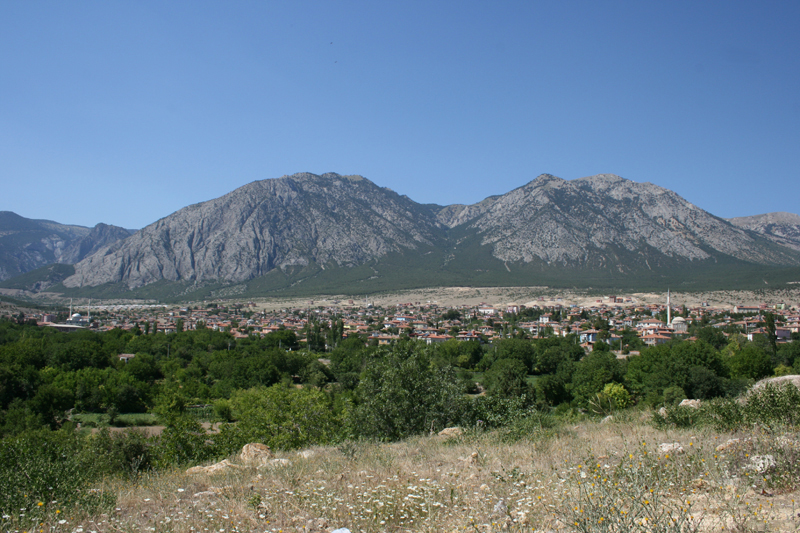

- Location within Turkey
- Coordinates: 41°08′04″N 34°29′14″E
- Country: Turkey
- Province: Çorum
- District: Kargı

Government
  - Mayor: Zeki Şen (AKP)
- Elevation: 400 m (1,300 ft)
- Population (2022): 5,537
- Time zone: UTC+3 (TRT)
- Postal code: 19910
- Area code: 0364
- Climate: Cfa
- Website: www.kargi.bel.tr

Kargı (Turkish: [ˈkaɾɡɯ]) is a town in Çorum Province in the Black Sea region of Turkey. It's located at 106 km (66 mi) from the city of Çorum; it is the seat of Kargı District. Its population is 5,537 (2022).

== History ==
The first settlement in Kargı is known in the Hellenistic period as Blaene, mentioned by Strabo. From 1867 until 1922, Kargı was part of Angora vilayet.

== Economy ==
The district is known for growing high-quality rice and okra and for producing a particular type of crumbly goat's milk cheese called tulum peyniri.
