= 2020 Turkish census =

According to the 2020 census, the population of Turkey is 83,614,362. It was determined that 41,915,985 of the population was male and 41,698,377 were female.

Census in Turkey
Year	Pop.	±%
1927	13,649,945	—
1935	16,188,767	+18.6%
1940	17,820,950	+10.1%
1945	18,790,174	+5.4%
1950	20,947,188	+11.5%
1955	24,064,763	+14.9%
1960	27,754,820	+15.3%
1965	31,391,421	+13.1%
1970	35,605,176	+13.4%
1975	40,347,719	+13.3%
1980	44,736,957	+10.9%
1985	50,664,458	+13.2%
1990	56,473,035	+11.5%
2000	67,803,927	+20.1%
2007	70,586,256	+4.1%
2008	71,517,100	+1.3%
2009	72,561,312	+1.5%
2010	73,722,988	+1.6%
2011	74,724,269	+1.4%
2012	75,627,384	+1.2%
2013	76,667,864	+1.4%
2014	77,695,904	+1.3%
2015	78,741,053	+1.3%
2016	79,814,871	+1.4%
2017	80,810,525	+1.2%
2018	82,003,882	+1.5%
2019	83,154,997	+1.4%
2020	83,614,362	+0.6%
2021	84,680,273	+1.3%
2022	85,279,553	+0.7%

== Populations of the provinces ==
Provinces	Population
İstanbul	15,462,452
Ankara	5,663,322
İzmir	4,394,694
Bursa	3,101,833
Antalya	2,548,308
Adana	2,258,718
Konya	2,250,020
Şanlıurfa	2,115,256
Gaziantep	2,101,157
Kocaeli	1,997,258
Mersin	1,868,757
Diyarbakır	1,783,431
Hatay	1,659,320
Manisa	1,450,616
Kayseri	1,421,455
Samsun	1,356,079
Balıkesir	1,240,285
Kahramanmaraş	1,168,163
Van	1,149,342
Aydın	1,119,084
Tekirdağ	1,081,065
Sakarya	1,042,649
Denizli	1,040,915
Muğla	1,000,773
Eskişehir	888,828
Mardin	854,716
Trabzon	811,901
Malatya	806,156
Ordu	761,400
Erzurum	758,279
Afyonkarahisar	736,912
Sivas	635,889
Adıyaman	632,459
Batman	620,278
Tokat	597,861
Zonguldak	591,204
Elazığ	587,960
Kütahya	576,688
Osmaniye	548,556
Çanakkale	541,548
Şırnak	537,762
Ağrı	535,435
Çorum	530,126
Giresun	448,721
Isparta	440,304
Aksaray	423,011
Yozgat	419,095
Muş	411,117
Edirne	407,763
Düzce	395,679
Kastamonu	376,377
Uşak	369,433
Niğde	362,071
Kırklareli	361,737
Bitlis	350,994
Rize	344,359
Amasya	335,494
Siirt	331,070
Bolu	314,802
Nevşehir	304,962
Kars	284,923
Bingöl	281,768
Hakkari	280,514
Kırıkkale	278,703
Yalova	276,050
Burdur	267,092
Karaman	254,919
Karabük	243,614
Kırşehir	243,042
Erzincan	234,431
Bilecik	218,717
Sinop	216,460
Iğdır	201,314
Bartın	198,979
Çankırı	192,428
Artvin	169,501
Kilis	142,792
Gümüşhane	141,702
Ardahan	96,161
Tunceli	83,443
Bayburt	81,910
