= 1935 Turkish census =

Turkish census

On 20 October 1935, a census was made in 57 provinces, 356 districts, 34.876 villages. Turkey's population was defined as 16,188,767. It was determined that 7,936,770 of the population was male (48.1%) and 8,221,248 (50.9%) were female.

Census in Turkey
Year	Pop.	±%
1927	13,649,945	—
1935	16,188,767	+18.6%
1940	17,820,950	+10.1%
1945	18,790,174	+5.4%
1950	20,947,188	+11.5%
1955	24,064,763	+14.9%
1960	27,754,820	+15.3%
1965	31,391,421	+13.1%
1970	35,605,176	+13.4%
1975	40,347,719	+13.3%
1980	44,736,957	+10.9%
1985	50,664,458	+13.2%
1990	56,473,035	+11.5%
2000	67,803,927	+20.1%
2007	70,586,256	+4.1%
2008	71,517,100	+1.3%
2009	72,561,312	+1.5%
2010	73,722,988	+1.6%
2011	74,724,269	+1.4%
2012	75,627,384	+1.2%
2013	76,667,864	+1.4%
2014	77,695,904	+1.3%
2015	78,741,053	+1.3%
2016	79,814,871	+1.4%
2017	80,810,525	+1.2%
2018	82,003,882	+1.5%
2019	83,154,997	+1.4%
2020	83,614,362	+0.6%
2021	84,680,273	+1.3%
2022	85,279,553	+0.7%

== Populations of the provinces ==
Provinces	Population
İstanbul	877.106
İzmir	594.560
Konya	539.257
Ankara	538.669
Balıkesir	495.451
Bursa	442.157
Sivas	435.629
Manisa	424.624
Malatya	412.025
Erzurum	386.477
Seyhan (Adana)	386.302
Kastamonu	361.728
Trabzon	359.796
Kütahya	342.780
Samsun	337.345
Kocaeli	334.973
Zonguldak	320.703
Kayseri	312.469
Tokat	310.152
Kars	304.244
Afyon	299.619
Çorum	286.751
Denizli	284.714
Gaziantep	283.464
Ordu	283.319
Çoruh (Artvin)	270.688
Yozgat	261.661
Aydın	260.709
Giresun	259.673
Elaziz	253.141
Niğde	247.436
Bolu	247.176
İçel	246.393
Antalya	241.210
Urfa	229.194
Mardin	226.020
Çanakkale	223.214
Diyarbakır	214.871
Sinop	203.648
Muğla	197.118
Tekirdağ	195.043
Maraş	189.699
Edirne	186.214
Eskişehir	182.961
Çankırı	177.731
Kırklareli	172.144
Gümüşhane	169.304
Isparta	166.646
Erzincan	152.933
Muş	157.503
Kırşehir	145.684
Van	142.672
Amasya	128.492
Siirt	127.870
Bilecik	125.417
Burdur	95.855
Ağrı	93.351
Total	16.188.767

== Religious affiliation ==
Religious group	Population	
Religious group	Number	%
Total	16 158 018	100.00
Muslim	15 838 673	98.02
Greek Orthodox	125 046	0.77
Armenian Orthodox	44 526	0.35
Armenian Catholics	11 229	0.35
Roman Catholics	32 155	0.20
Protestants	8 486	0.05
Jewish	78 730	0.49
Other religions	12 965	
Irreligious	559	

== Language ==
The census questioned the language spoken at home.

Language	Population	
Language	Number	%
Turkish	13 899 073	86,02
Kurdish	1 480 246	9,16
Arabic	153 687	0,95
Greek	108 725	0,67
Circassian	91 972	0,57
Laz	63 253	0,39
Armenian	57 599	0,36
Georgian	57 325	0,36
Ladino	42 607	0,27
Pomak	32 661	0,20
Bosnian	24 613	0,15
Albanian	22 754	0,14
Bulgarian	18 245	0,11
Tatar	15 615	0,10
Spanish	14 242	0,09
Abaza	10 099	0,06
Romani	7 855	0,05
French	5 381	0,03
German	5 047	0,03
Russian	4 810	0,03
Italian	4 633	0,03
Serbian	4 369	0,03
Persian	2 053	0,01
English	1 482	0,01
Hungarian	885	0,01
Romanian	699	
Polish	494	
Czechoslovak	200	
Flemish	130	
Swedish	114	
Croatian	83	
Others	12 466	0,08
Unknown	14 033	0,09
Total	16 157 450	100

== Maps of provinces in Turkey by percentage of spoken first language ==
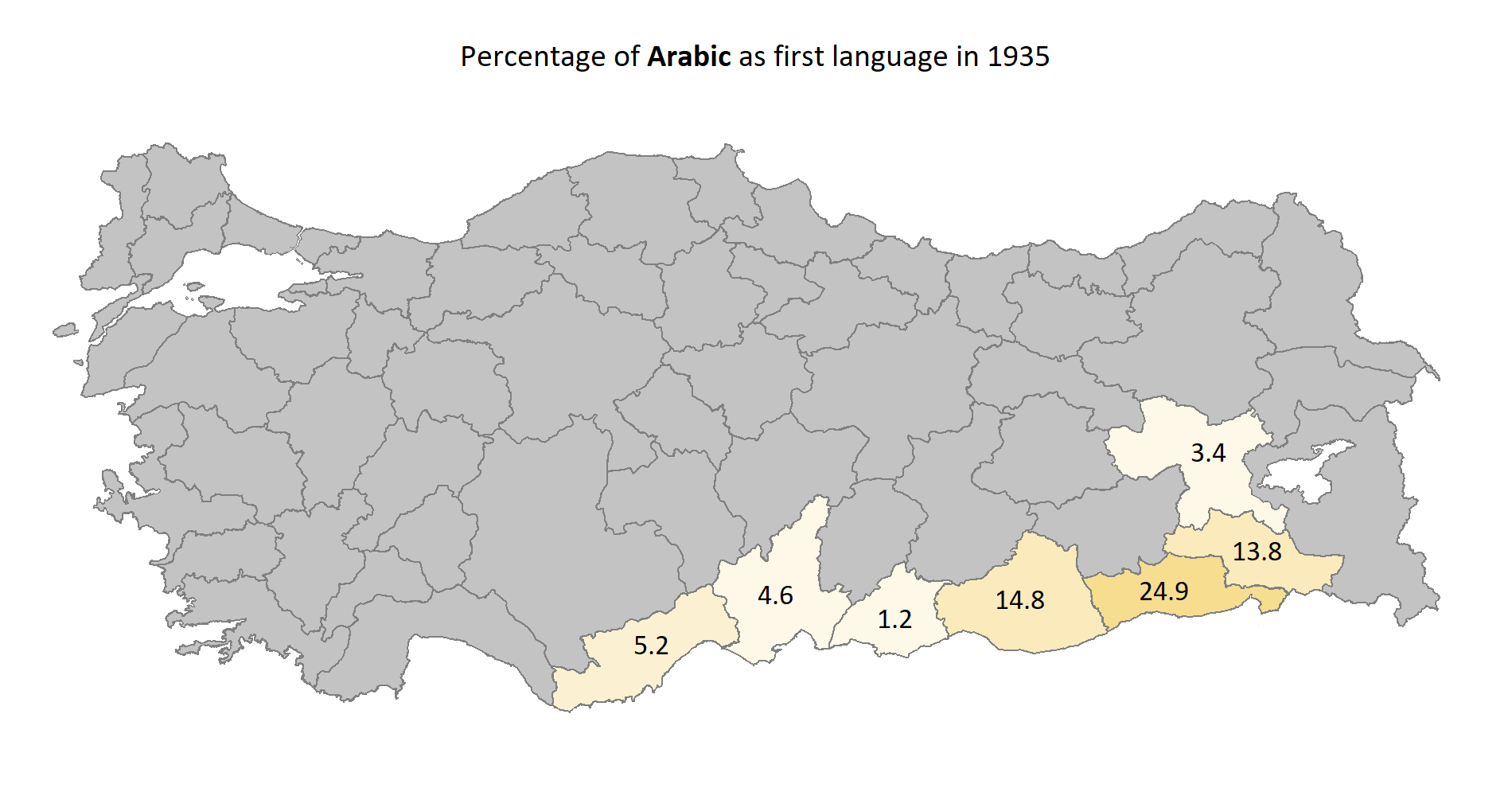
Arabic

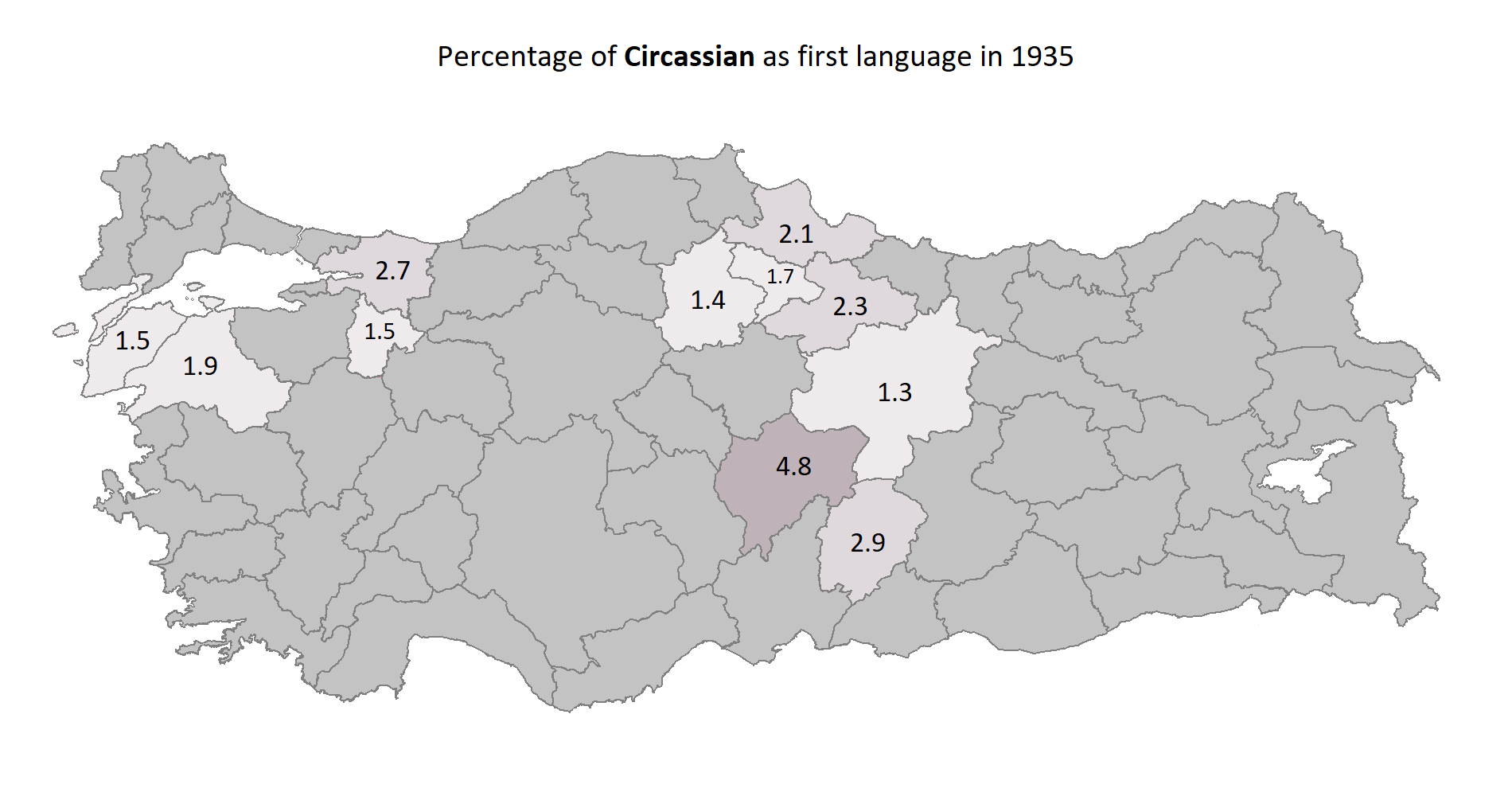
Circassian

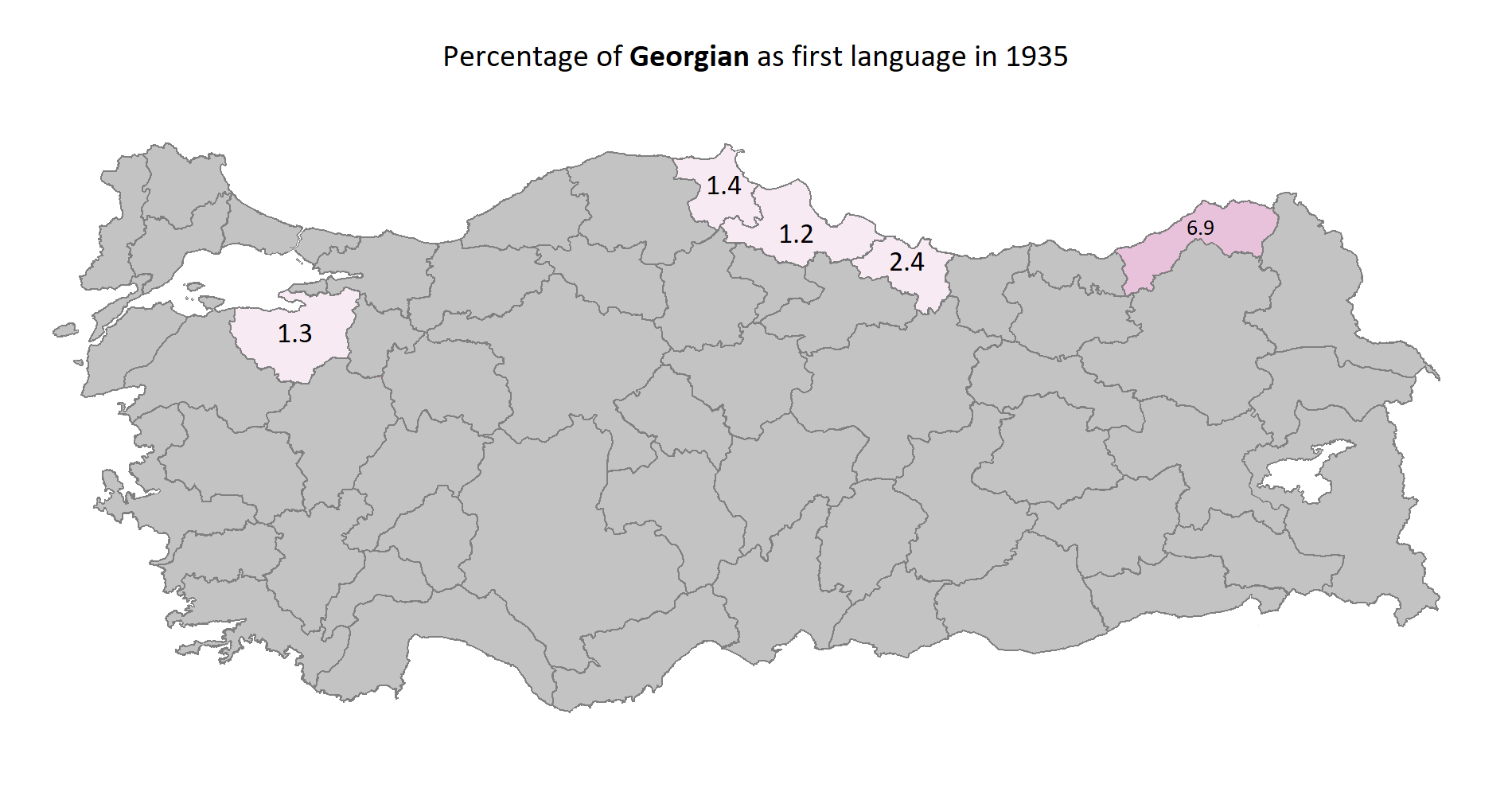
Georgian

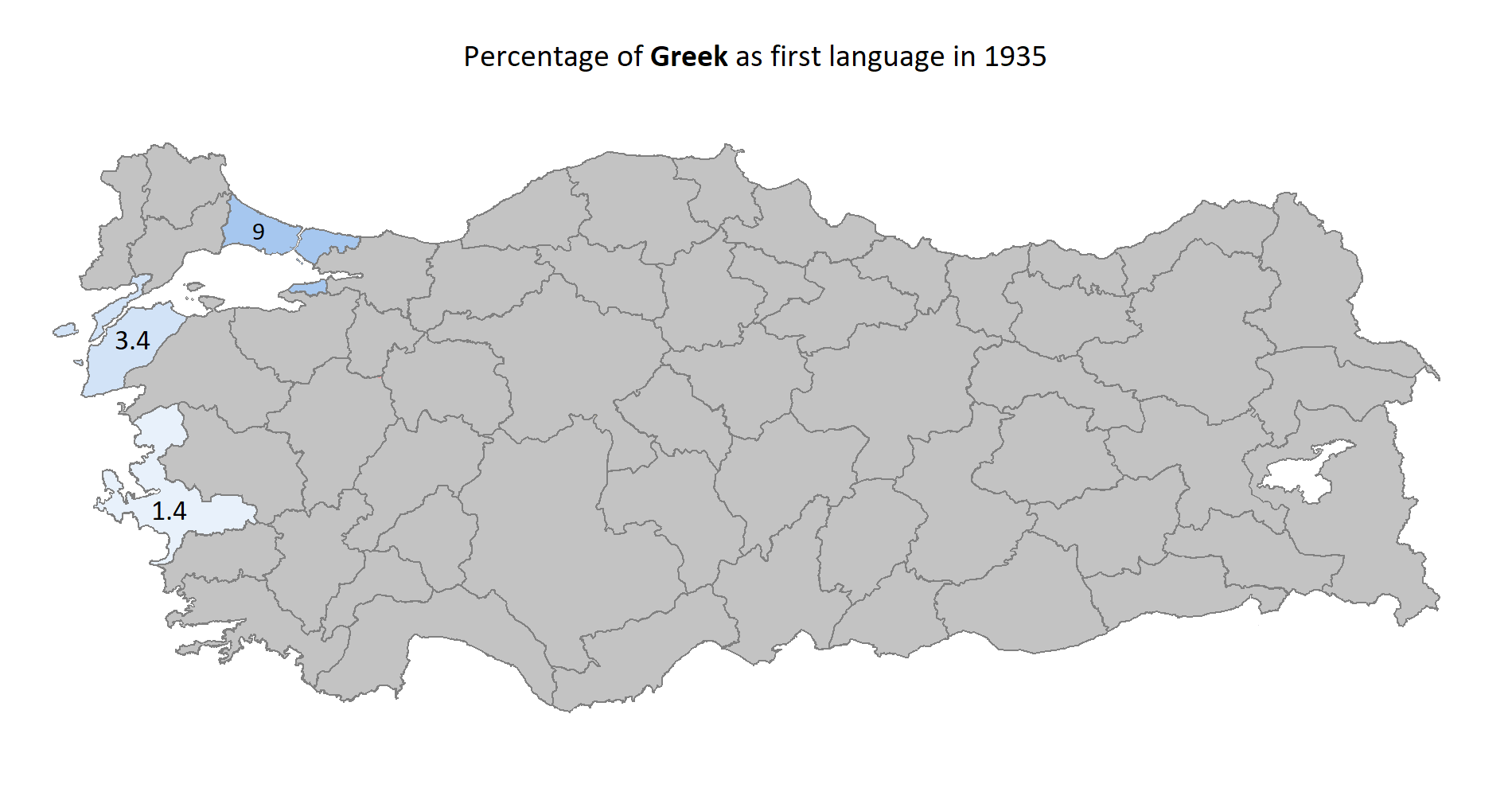
Greek

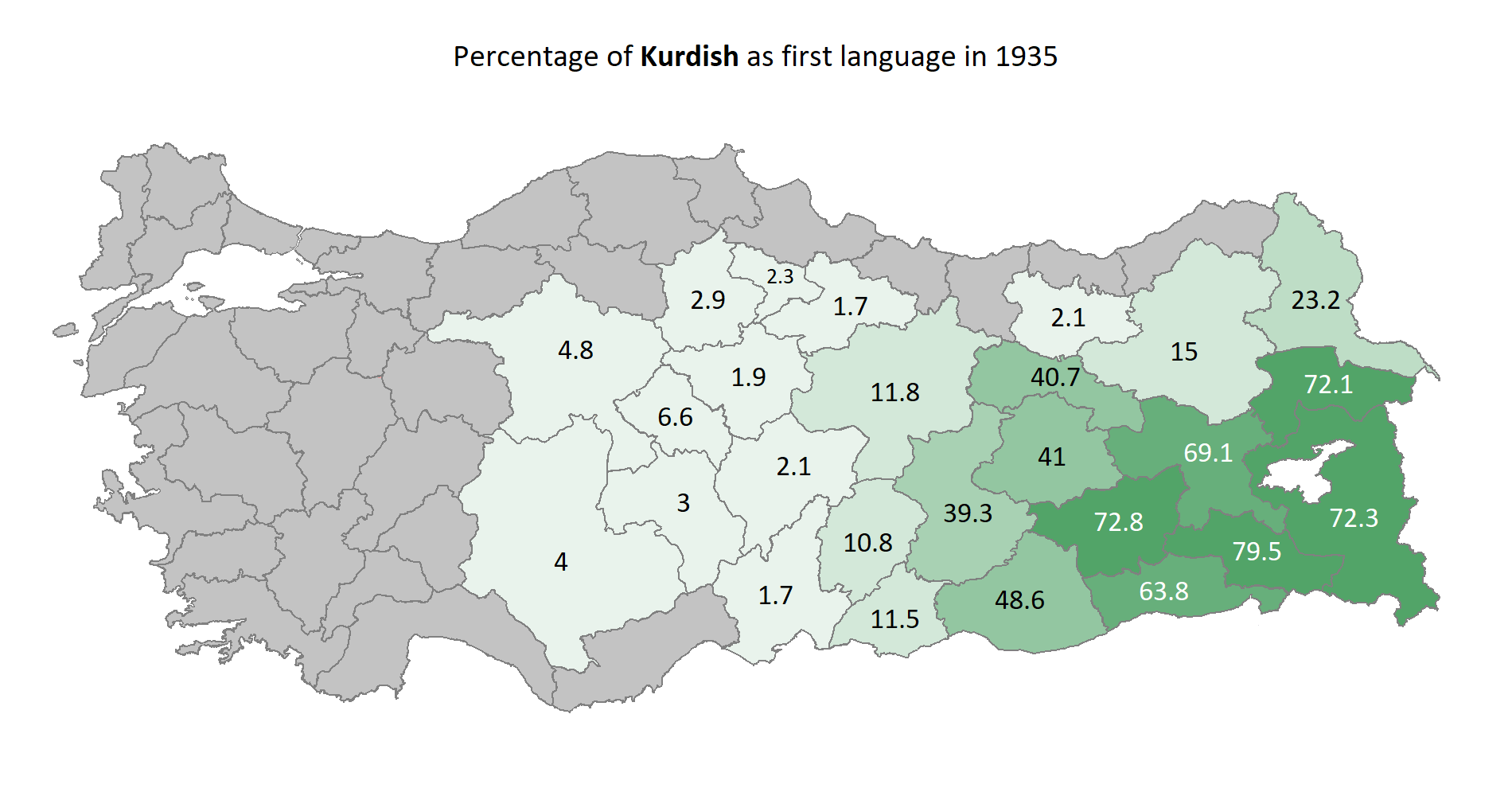
Kurdish

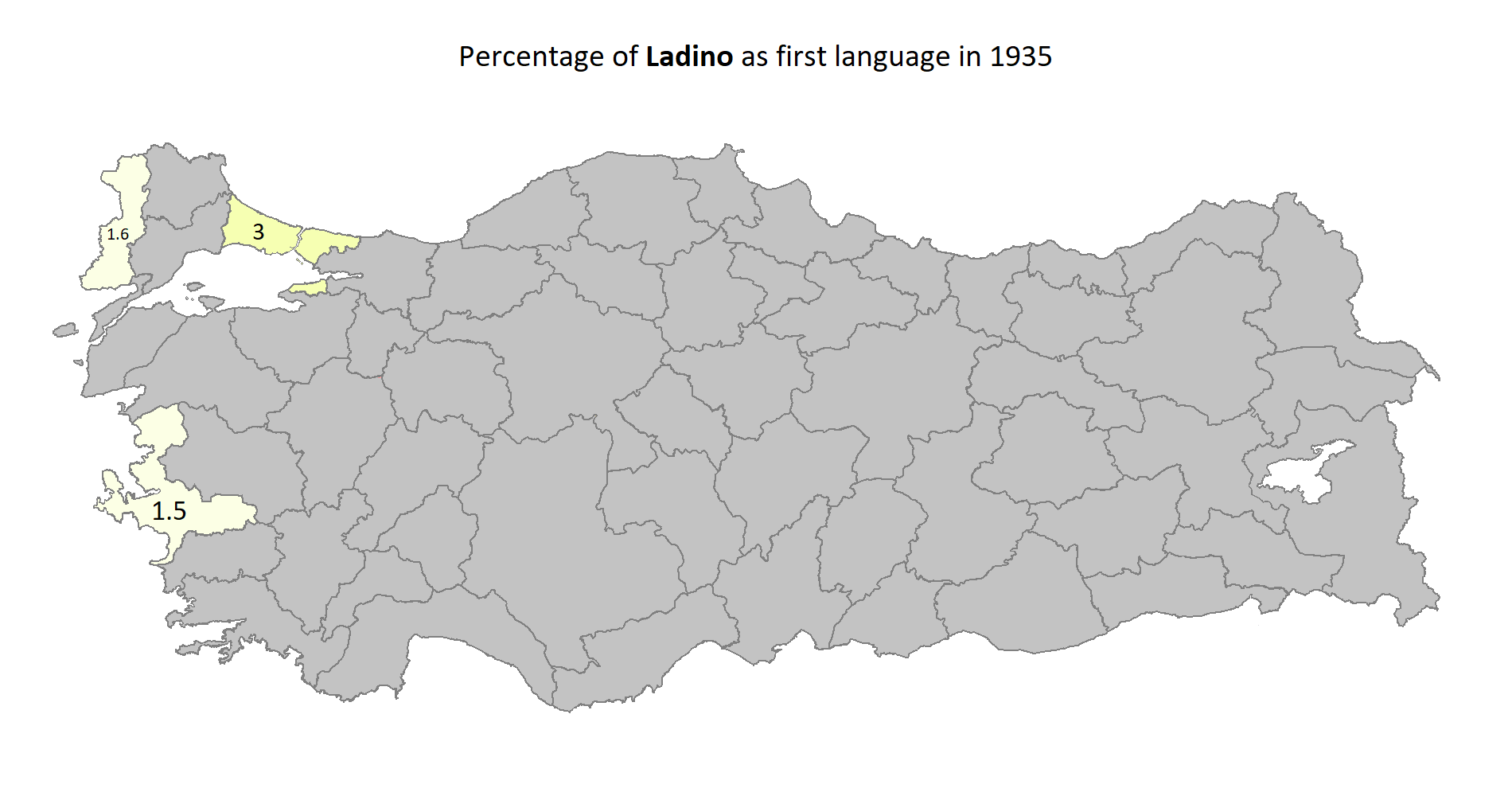
Ladino

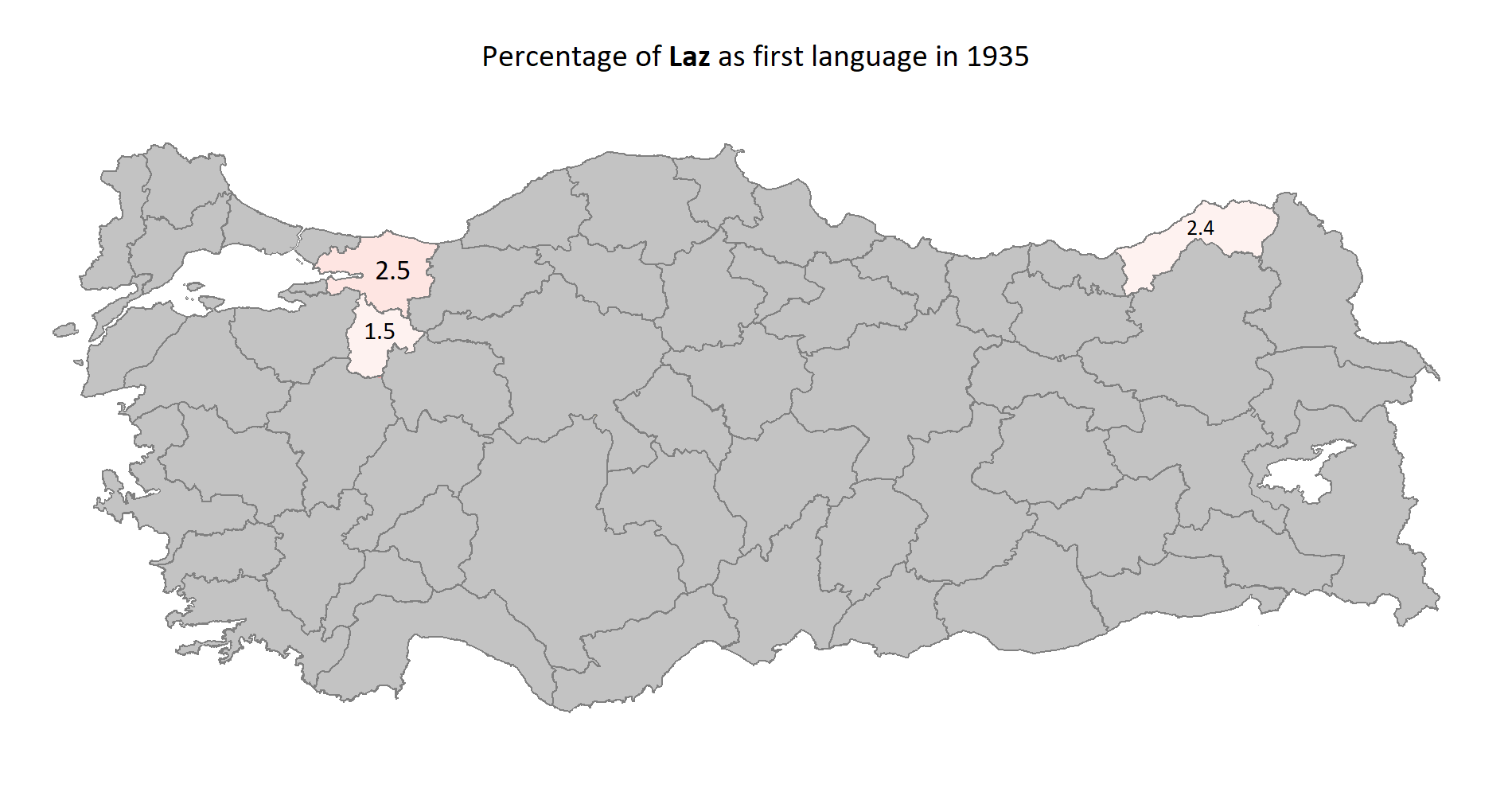
Laz

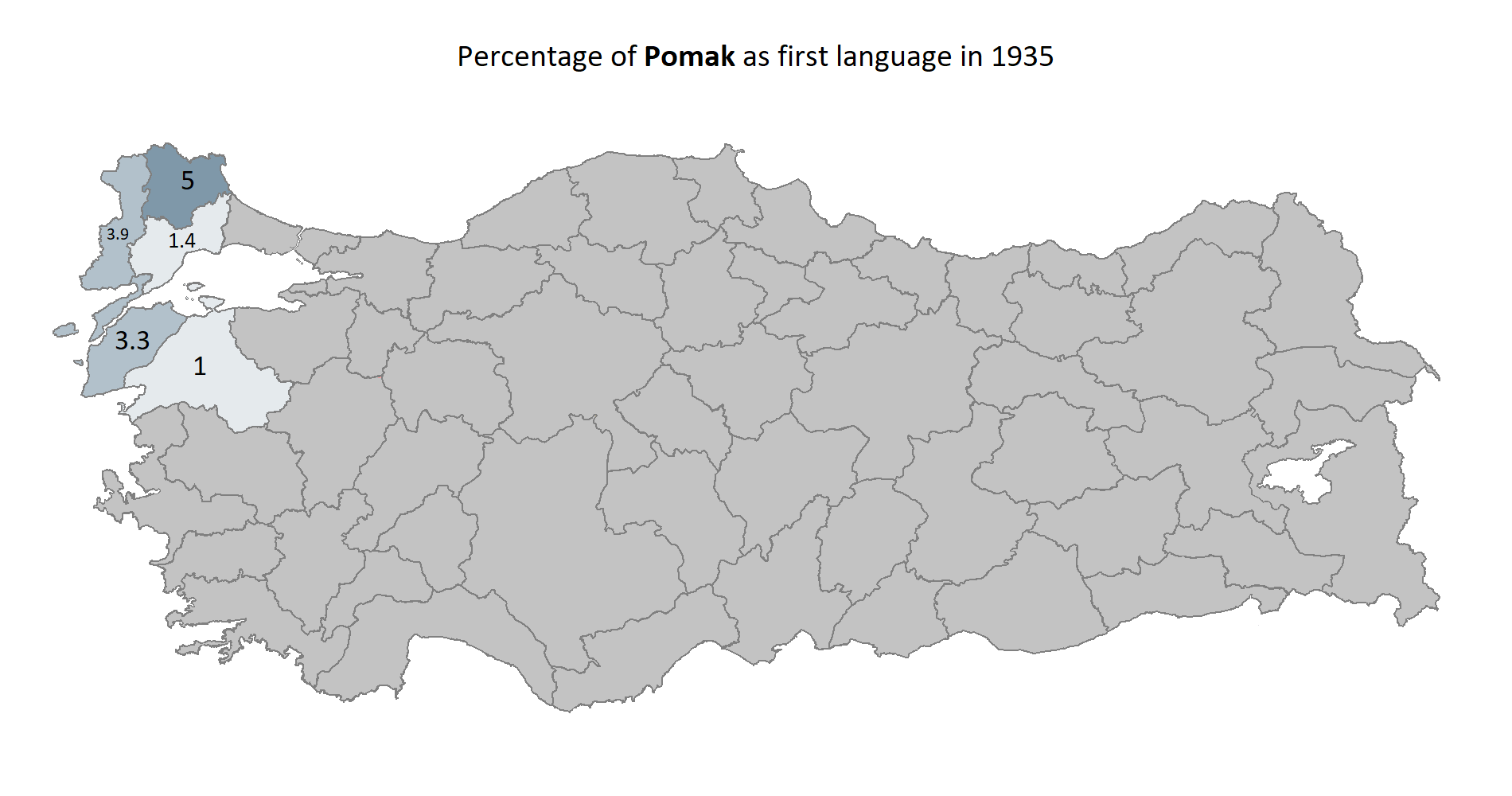
Pomak

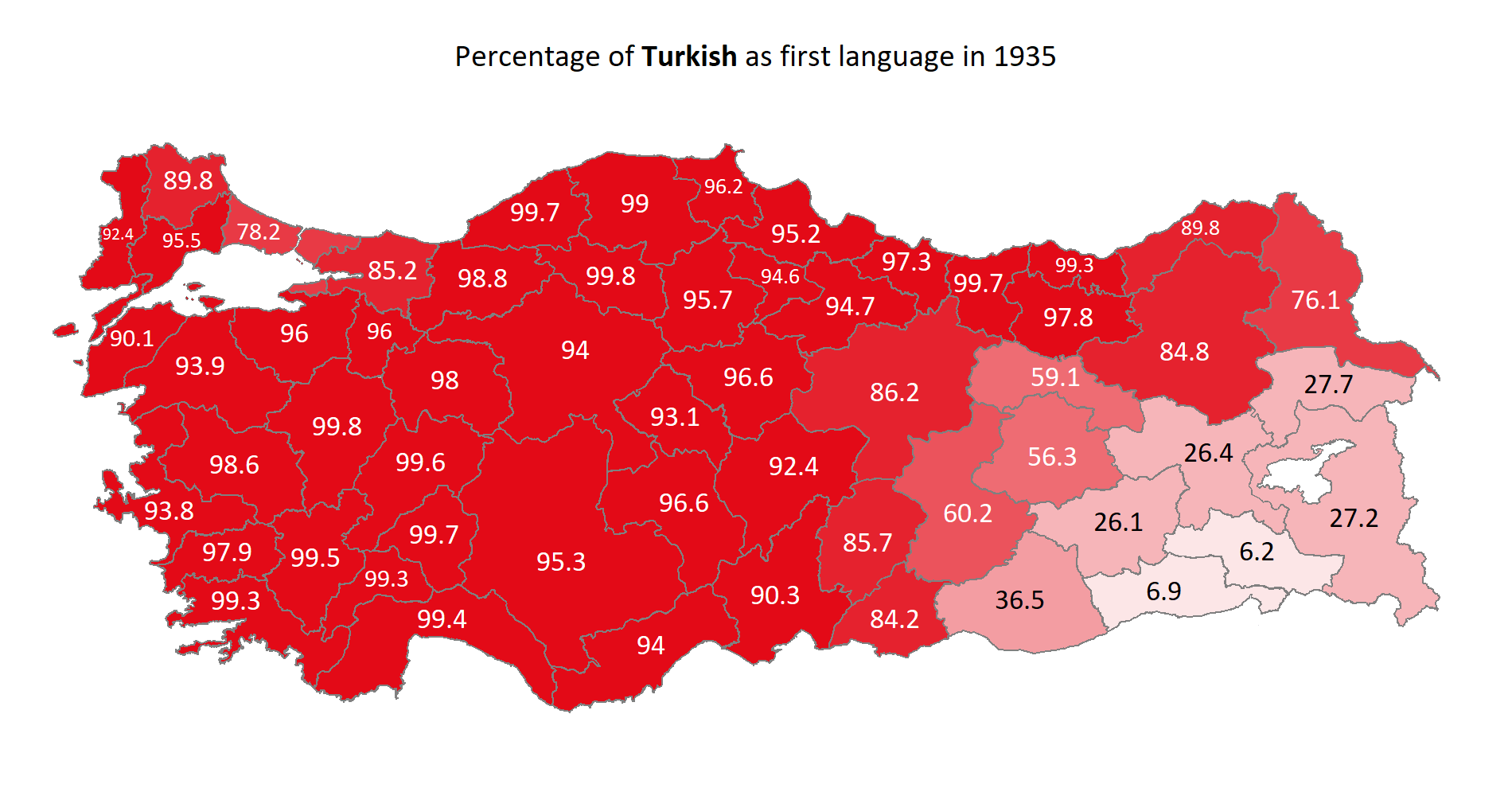
Turkish
