= 1990 Turkish census =

The 1990 Turkish census was held in 1990 and recorded the population and demographic details of every settlement in Turkey.

The Republic of Turkey performed censuses every 5 years from 1935 to 1990. After 1990, this shifted to overy 10 years. In 2020, Turkey shifted to a register-based census methodology.

Data from the 1990 census was used to investigate participation of persons in emigration, with the question; How many household members are absent now; are they in the country or abroad?

Census in Turkey
Year	Pop.	±%
1927	13,649,945	—
1935	16,188,767	+18.6%
1940	17,820,950	+10.1%
1945	18,790,174	+5.4%
1950	20,947,188	+11.5%
1955	24,064,763	+14.9%
1960	27,754,820	+15.3%
1965	31,391,421	+13.1%
1970	35,605,176	+13.4%
1975	40,347,719	+13.3%
1980	44,736,957	+10.9%
1985	50,664,458	+13.2%
1990	56,473,035	+11.5%
2000	67,803,927	+20.1%
2007	70,586,256	+4.1%
2008	71,517,100	+1.3%
2009	72,561,312	+1.5%
2010	73,722,988	+1.6%
2011	74,724,269	+1.4%
2012	75,627,384	+1.2%
2013	76,667,864	+1.4%
2014	77,695,904	+1.3%
2015	78,741,053	+1.3%
2016	79,814,871	+1.4%
2017	80,810,525	+1.2%
2018	82,003,882	+1.5%
2019	83,154,997	+1.4%
2020	83,614,362	+0.6%
2021	84,680,273	+1.3%
2022	85,279,553	+0.7%
