= Ereğli–Armutçuk railway =

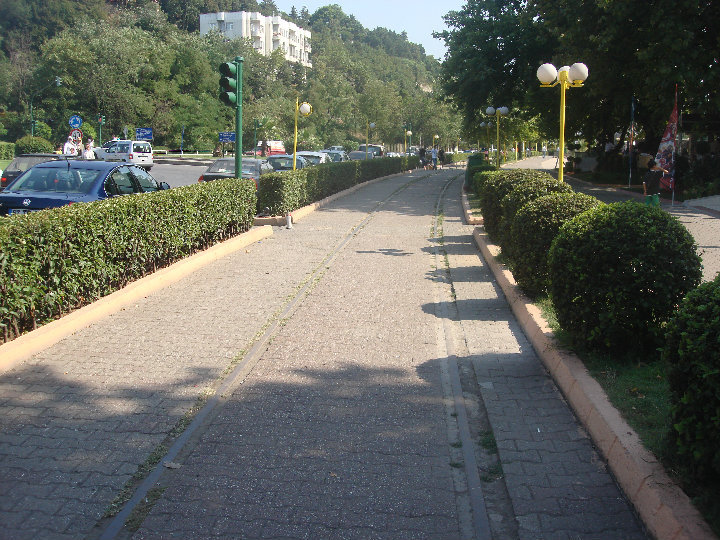
- The railway running along the esplanade of Ereğli.

Overview
- Status: Abandoned
- Owner: Turkish State Railways
- Locale: Black Sea Region
- Termini: Karadeniz Ereğli, Zonguldak; Armutçuk, Zonguldak

History
- Opened: 1953
- Closed: 7 May 2000

Technical
- Line length: 13 km (8.1 mi)
- Track gauge: 1,435 mm (4 ft 8 1/2 in) standard gauge

The Ereğli–Armutçuk railway is an abandoned railway in the Zonguldak Province of Turkey. The railway ran from a large coal mine in Armutçuk (present day Kandilli) to the port town of Karadeniz Ereğli and the large Erdemir steel mill. The primary function of the line was to bring coal from the mines to the steel mill, but passenger service also operated to small villages along the line.

The railway was originally constructed to be the northern terminus of the Irmak-Zonguldak railway, since Ereğli had a larger port than Zonguldak; however the cost of bridging the 22 km (14 mi) gap between Armutçuk and Kozlu (the terminus of the Irmak-Zonguldak railway) proved to be too expensive, due to the mountainous terrain. Plans were postponed thereafter and due to the lack of government investment into the Turkish railways in the second half of the 20th century, the railways were never connected. Instead, the line operated as an isolated railway for about 40 years until it was abandoned on 7 May 2000.
