= Filyos Valley Project =

The Filyos Valley Project (Turkish: Filyos Vadisi Projesi) is a project started in 2014 with the aim of creating a mega-industrial area in the Turkish Zonguldak district on the western Black Sea coast of the country. Filyos is located on the Black Sea coast in town of Çaycuma district in Zonguldak Province, northwestern Turkey.

== Overview ==
The Filyos Valley Project is the most important project that will trigger economic development in the region. This investment basin, which includes Port of Filyos, Filyos Industrial Park, Filyos Free Zone and Development Area, is called the Filyos Valley Project.

Its aim is to create Turkey's one of the biggest industrial complex. By the end of the Project it is expected to open up at least 10k employment. The port planned to be built within the scope of the project is also of great importance with an annual cargo loading-unloading capacity of 25 million tons per year capacity. The construction of Filyos Port started on 19 July 2016, and by 2020 98% of the construction of the port was finished. The project has an important logistical potential with its proximity to Zonguldak Airport, Zonguldak railway station and road connections passing near the port area. With the newly discovered Gas reserves in the Black Sea region, the Port of Filyos will be used for Gas transport, which will help the growth of the Industrial Zone.

== Aim ==
The aim of the project is to create:

- 597 hectares of Filyos Industrial Zone
- 1166 hectares of Filyos Free Zone
- 620 hectares of Free Zone Expansion Area
- Filyos Port with a capacity of 25 million tons per year
- Multi-modal transportation opportunity
