= Zonguldak-Filyos Regional =

Regional rail in Turkey

Overview
- Service type: Regional rail
- Status: Operating
- Locale: Zonguldak, Turkey
- First service: 26 March 2014
- Current operator(s): TCDD

Route
- Termini: Zonguldak; Filyos
- Average journey time: 36 minutes
- Service frequency: Three trains daily, each way

Technical
- Rolling stock: TCDD DM15000
- Track gauge: 1,435 mm (4 ft 8 1/2 in)
- Track owner(s): TCDD

The Zonguldak-Filyos Regional (Turkish: Zonguldak-Filyos Bölgesel Treni) is a newly implemented regional rail service running along the Black Sea coast between Zonguldak and Filyos, with eight intermediate stations. The service restored passenger rail operations in Zonguldak that ended in 2010, when the Karaelmas Express was shortened to run between Karabük and Çankırı.
