= 1990 census =

The following censuses were conducted in 1990:

- 1990 Chinese census
- 1990 Turkish census
- 1990 United States census
