= 2010 census =

2010 census may refer to:

- 2010 Chinese Census
- 2010 Dominican Republic Census
- 2010 Indonesian census
- 2010 Malaysian Census
- 2010 Russian Census
- 2010 Turkish census
- 2010 United States census
- 2010 Zambian census
- 2010 Brazilian census
