= Kandilli, Zonguldak =

Kandilli
- Municipality
- Location in Turkey
- Coordinates: 41.3479°N 31.5364°E
- Country: Turkey
- Province: Zonguldak
- District: Ereğli

Government
  - Mayor: Mustafa Aydın (CHP)
- Elevation: 360 m (1,180 ft)
- Population (2022): 2,573
- Time zone: UTC+3 (TRT)
- Postal code: 67390
- Area code: 0372
- Website: www.kandilli.bel.tr

Kandilli (before 2003: Armutçuk) is a town in Ereğli District, Zonguldak Province, Turkey. Its population is 2,573 (2022).

Kandilli is located on top of a mountain about 10 km north east of Karadeniz Ereğli and about 40 km west of Zonguldak city. It is about 1 km from the coast of the Black Sea but due to the precipitous cliffs it is not readily accessible. Kandilli used to have a small port facility at the bottom of the cliffs which was accessible using a funicular railway contraption which was still operable as of 2002.

The main industry of the town is a coal mine producing black coal. A railway exists from Kandilli to the port at Eregli but is not in use. The route of the railway is scenic and has been suggested by local entrepreneurs as a possible tourist railway.
