= Port of Filyos =

Location
- Country: Turkey
- Location: Filyos, Çaycuma, Zonguldak
- Coordinates: 41°33′53″N 32°01′17″E

Details
- Opened: 2021
- Type of harbour: Cargo

Statistics
- Annual cargo tonnage: 25 million

Port of Filyos (Turkish: Filyos Limanı) is a cargo port on the Black Sea coast at Zonguldak Province, Turkey.

Port of Filyos is located at the Black Sea coast in Filyos town of Çaycuma district in Zonguldak Province, northwestern Turkey. It is part of the Filyos Valley Project, which was launched on June 1, 2015 and is budgeted to US$1.5 billion. The project goes back to the time of Ottoman Sultan Abdul Hamid II (reigned 1876–1909). The groundbreaking took place in presence of Prime minister Binali Yıldırım on December 9, 2016. Its completion is expected to be on July 15, 2019. The port's annual cargo loading-unloading capacity is projected to be 25 million tons. When in service, around, it will provide employment for around 12,000 people. The construction will cost ₺ 538 million (approx. US$156 million) in total. The hinterland covering hundreds of thousand acres will be developed as an industrial park. With Port of Filyos, which will be the country's third biggest port, Zonguldak will be an important part of marine transportation in Turkey.
