= Nilgün Efes =

Turkish entrepreneur and journalist (born 1957)

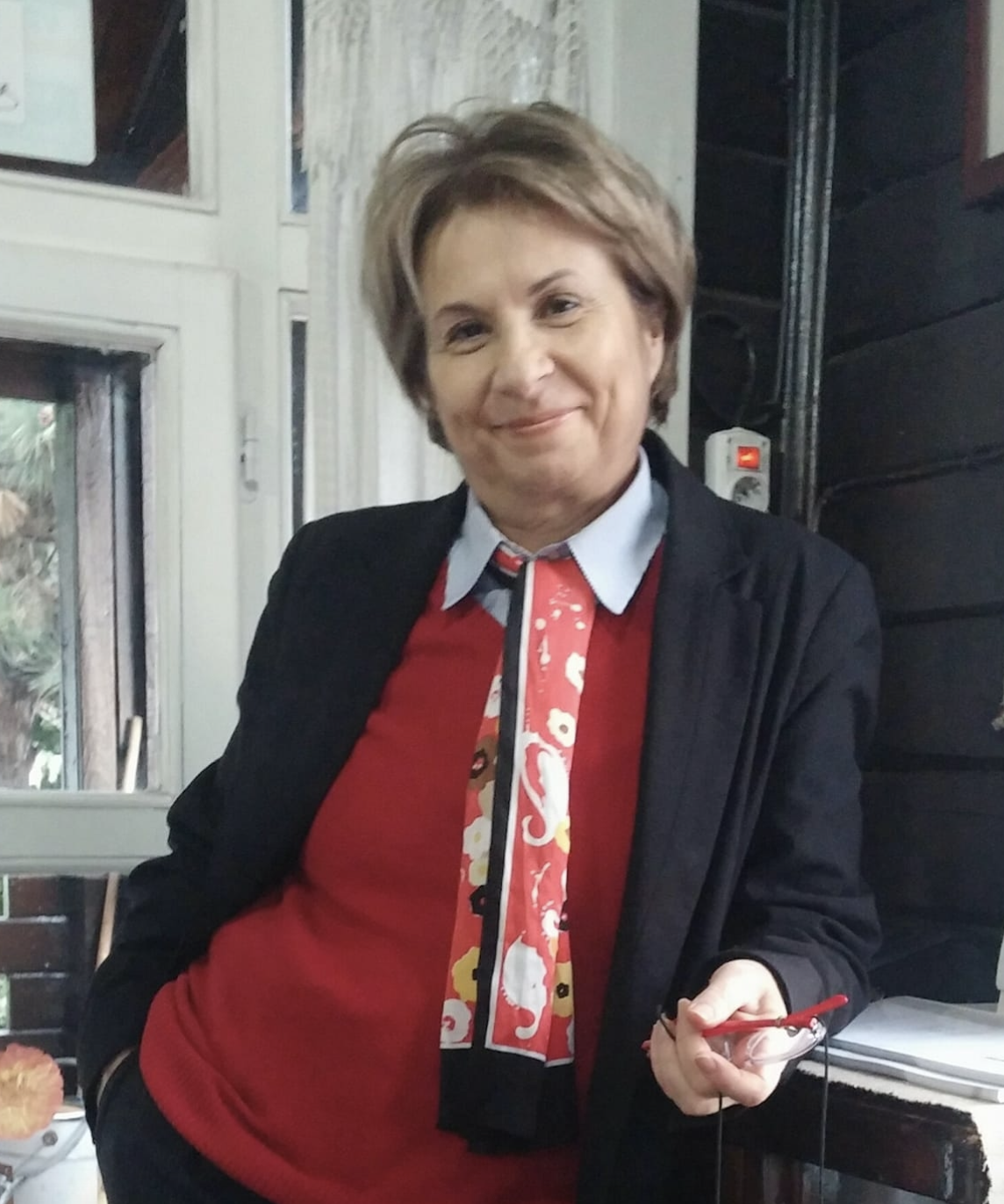
- Born: 1957 (age 68–69); Zonguldak, Turkey
- Citizenship: Republic of Turkey
- Education: Marmara University
- Children: 2
- Awards: BAKZIFED Regional Entrepreneurs and Women Explorers Award

Nilgün Efes (born 1957, Zonguldak) Turkish entrepreneur and journalist. Nilgün Efes is the president of Ereğli Entrepreneur and Executive Business Women's Association (ERGİKAD) and a local hand-woven Elpek Cloth producer of Zonguldak.

== Life and career ==
Efes was born in 1957 in Zonguldak. After completing her primary and secondary education in Zonguldak, she graduated from Marmara University, Faculty of Communication. After working as a journalist, she founded her own company in 1996. In 1997, she established the Elpek Cloth weaving house in the Kandilli district of Ereğli and revived the Elpek Cloth, one of the forgotten traditions. In 2018, she was deemed worthy of an award in the field of Regional Entrepreneurs and Women Explorers at the Turkey's Values Awards given by the Black Sea Industrialists' and Business People's Associations Federation.
