= Irmak–Zonguldak railway =

Railway line in Turkey

Irmak-Zonguldak railway
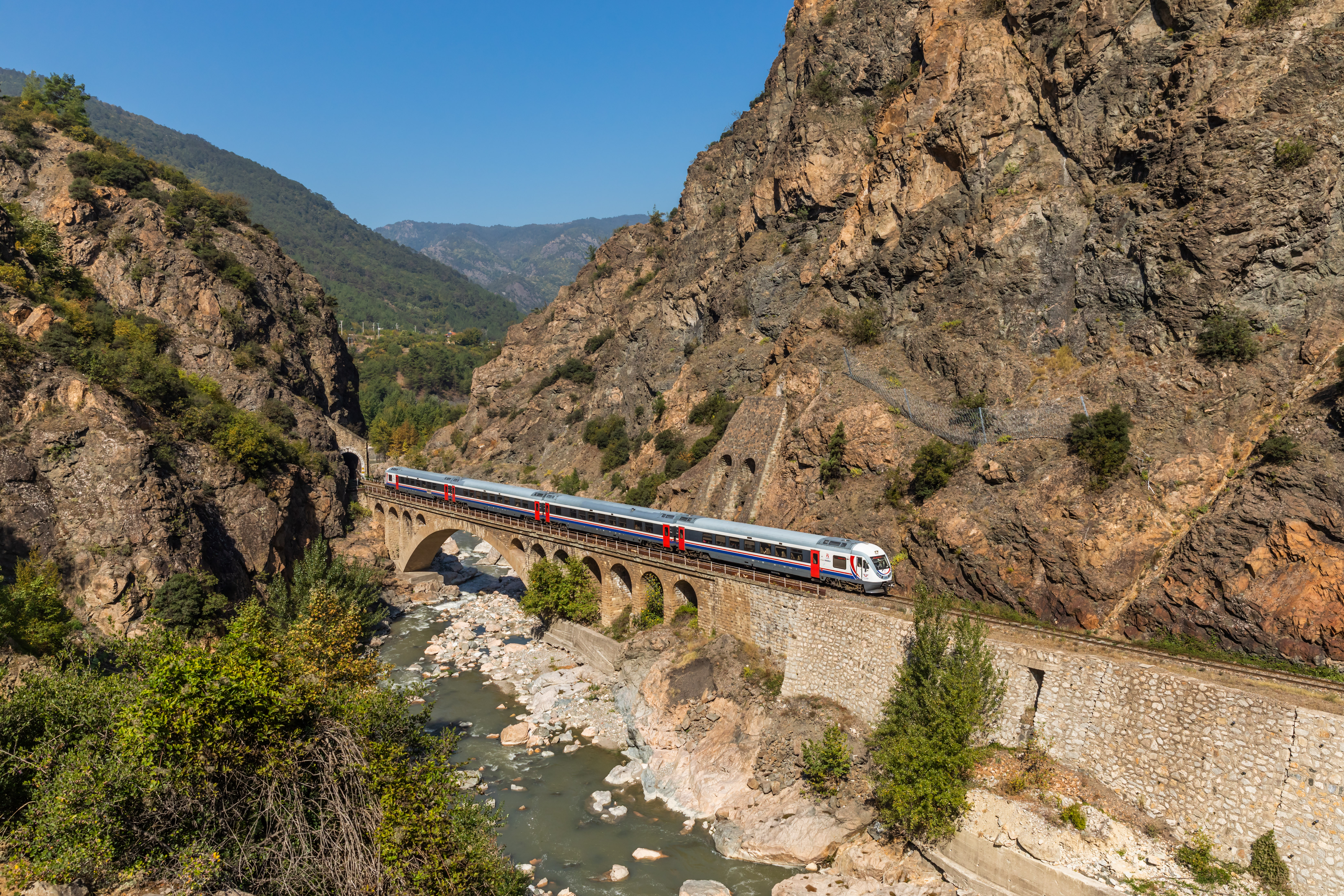
- A regional train crossing the Filyos River.

Overview
- Owner: Turkish State Railways
- Locale: Black Sea Region
- Termini: Irmak, Kırıkkale; Kozlu, Zonguldak

Service
- Type: Freight rail with a small passenger section

History
- Opened: 23 April 1931 (Irmak-Çankırı); 12 August 1937 (Çankırı-Zonguldak)

Technical
- Track gauge: 1,435 mm (4 ft 8 1/2 in) standard gauge

The Irmak–Zonguldak railway (Turkish: Irmak-Zonguldak demiryolu) is a railway line in the Black Sea Region of Turkey. The railway connects the industrial coal regions and the port of Zonguldak as well as the Kardemir steel mill to central Anatolia and is a major freight railway. Due to the importance the railway has on the Turkish coal industry, it has been nicknamed the coal-route (Turkish: kömüryolu). The railway was built by the Turkish State Railways in 1937. A thrice-weekly passenger train, the Karaelmas Express, ran from Ankara to Zonguldak but was discontinued on 1 January 2010. In 2014, regional passenger service was brought back between Zonguldak and Filyos but the line today is mainly for freight rail.
