= Sandaraca =

Coastal town of ancient Bithynia

Coordinates: 41°27′24″N 31°47′12″E

Sandaraca or Sandarake (Ancient Greek: Σανδαράκη) was a coastal town of ancient Bithynia, at a distance of 90 stadia to the east of the river Oxines

Its site is located near Zonguldak in Asiatic Turkey.
