= List of free zones of Turkey =

Beginning by 1987, Turkey established a number of Free Zones. Free zones are defined as fenced-in areas in which special regulatory treatment exists for the operating users in order to promote exports of goods and services. Free Zones offer more convenient and flexible business climate in order to increase trade volume and export for some industrial and commercial activities as compared to the other parts of the country. Basic objectives of the Free Zones are promoting export oriented investment and production, accelerating foreign direct investment and technology access, directing enterprises towards export, developing international trade. Currently, the list of zones is as follows:

Below is the list of free zones in Turkey.

== Free zones in Turkey ==
SN	Name	Province	Foundation date
1	Mersin Free Zone	Mersin	1987
2	Antalya Free Zone	Antalya	1987
3	Aegean Free Zone	İzmir	1990
4	Istanbul İhtisas Free Zone	Istanbul	1990
5	Trabzon Free Zone	Trabzon	1992
6	Istanbul Leather Industry Free Zone	Istanbul	1995
7	İzmir Free Zone	İzmir (Menemen)	1998
8	Rize Free Zone	Rize	1998
9	Samsun Free Zone	Samsun	1998
10	Istanbul Tracia Free Zone	Istanbul	1998
11	Kayseri Free Zone	Kayseri	1998
12	Adana Yumurtalık Free Zone	Adana (Yumurtalık)	1998
13	European Free Zone	Tekirdağ (Çorlu)	1999
14	Gaziantep Free Zone	Gaziantep	1999
15	Bursa Free Zone	Bursa	2001
16	Kocaeli Free Zone	Kocaeli	2001
17	Denizli Free Zone	Denizli	2002
18	Tubitak Free Zone	Kocaeli (Gebze)	2002
19	Batı Anadolu Free Zone	İzmir (Bergama)	2021

European Free Trade Zone (EFZ) (www.asb.com.tr), Istanbul-Leather and Industrial Free Zone (www.desbas.com.tr) and Aegean Free Zone (www.esbas.com.tr) are one of the most active and largest Free Zones in Turkey. Free Zones offer ready offices, warehouses, open stock areas, production facilities for rent or sale and lands with ready infrastructure. All kinds of infrastructure services (electricity, water, gas, waste water, purification, communication) are provided by Founder and Operator Companies in accordance with the free zone authority in these areas. In addition to these facilitations, Free Zones also offers construction – undertaking services, catering, IT Services, Maintenance Services, Insurance, Loading/Unloading, Warehousing, Consulting Services, 24-hour Private Security and Conference Halls.

== Incentives and advantages of Free Trade Zones ==
- Companies which have an operating licence about "Manufacturing" are 100% exempt from Corporate Tax (20%) and Income Tax (15%-35%).
- Free Zones are considered to be outside of the customs border, no Customs Duty, Value Added Tax (VAT) or KKDF (6% over the credit payments) is applied on the goods that enter the zone.
- Companies that sell at least 85% of their products abroad are 100% exempt from the income tax payable over salaries of employees.
- Due to the Custom Union Agreement between Turkey & EU, Turkish origin goods are in free circulation in EU Market (No Tax between TR & EU)
- Companies can freely transfer their profits and earnings to Turkey or any other country.
- As Free Zones are outside of the customs border, companies can purchase good from Turkey for export prices. (No VAT)
- Infrastructure services are provided exempt from VAT (Electricity, water, Gas, telecommunication)
- Companies are free to bring second hand (used) machinery to the Free Zones.
- As the transactions within performed with convertible foreign currencies, domestic inflation rate will not influence purchasing and selling activities, inventory control and accounting procedures in general.
- The faulty goods can easily be returned to their origin by just issuing an invoice.
- Companies can keep their stock duty-free for an unlimited period of time.
