= Zonguldak railway station =

Railway station in Zonguldak, Turkey

ZONGULDAK
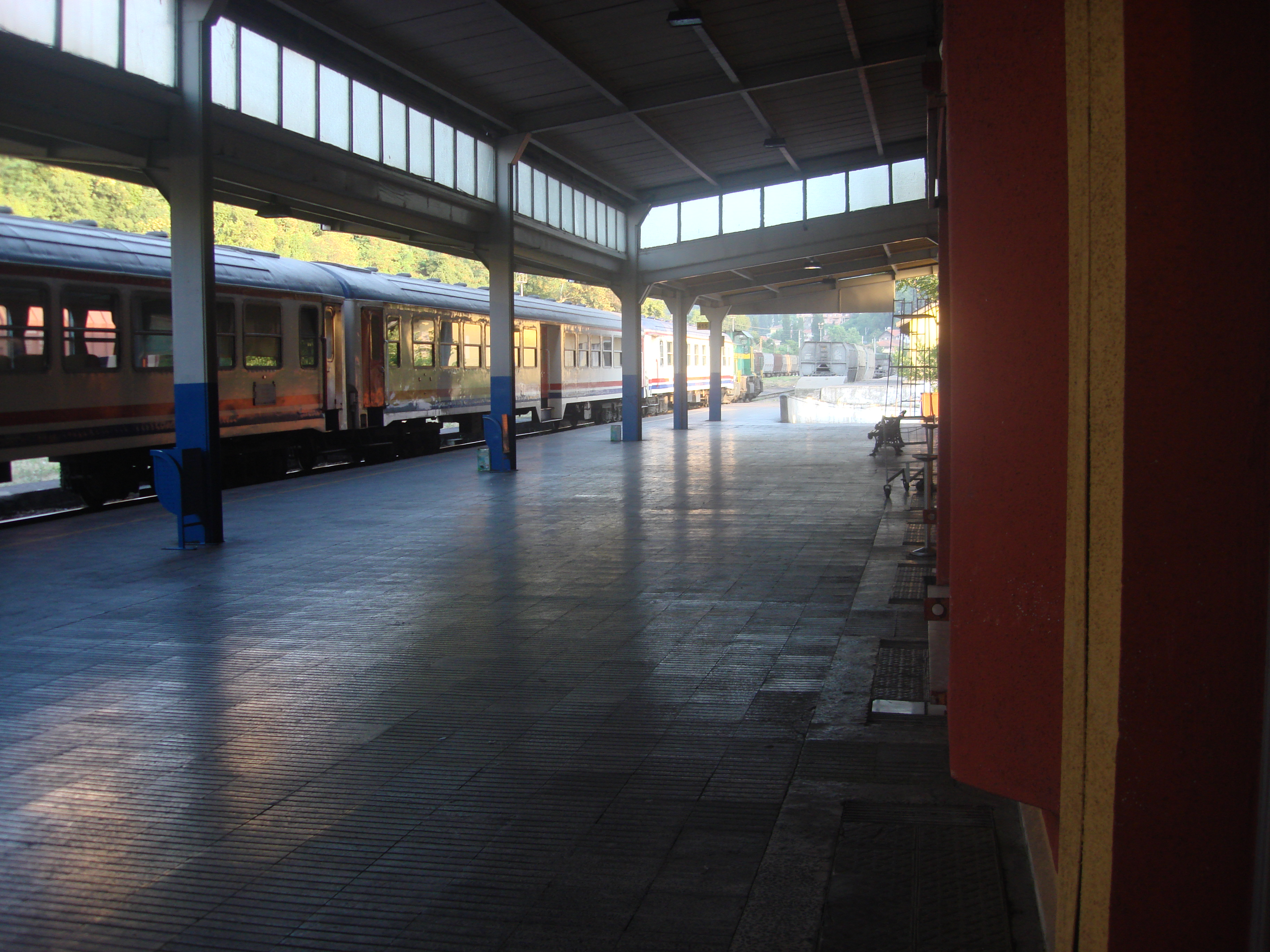
- The track side of the station.

General information
- Location: İstasyon Cad. 65D, Karaelmas Mah. 67020; Zonguldak; Turkey
- Coordinates: 41.4469°N 31.7938°E
- System: TCDD Taşımacılık regional rail station
- Owner: Turkish State Railways
- Operator: TCDD Taşımacılık
- Line: Zonguldak–Karabük Zonguldak–Gökçebey
- Platforms: 1 side platform
- Tracks: 1

Construction
- Structure type: At-grade
- Parking: Yes

History
- Opened: 12 August 1937

Services
Preceding station	TCDD Taşımacılık	Following station
Kapuz towards Karabük	Zonguldak–Karabük	Terminus
Kapuz towards Gökçebey	Zonguldak–Gökçebey	Terminus
Location

Zonguldak railway station (Turkish: Zonguldak garı) is a regional (formally inter-city) railway station in Zonguldak, Turkey. It is the western terminus of the Zonguldak-Filyos Regional and was the former northern terminus of the Karaelmas Express from Ankara. It was opened in 1937 as the northern terminus of the Irmak-Zonguldak railway. The railway today is primarily a freight railway as the only passenger service is a thrice-daily regional service to Filyos. The station is located in the neighborhood of Karaelmas along İstasyon Street in the southern part of the city.
