= Census in Turkey =

Mass population survey conducted in Turkey

Census in Turkey is held by TÜİK (Statistics Institution of Turkey).

The first census in Ottoman Empire was held in 1831 by Mahmud II to identify soldier population and tax accounting. Thus, only men were included in this census.

The first census in the Turkish Republic was held in 1927 and every 5 years from 1935 and 2000. Traditional censuses were held by 1 day curfew across the country in Sunday's. After 2000, "Address Based Census" was made by TÜİK. The first results of 2007 census published in 2008. "Address Based Census" are announced yearly.

== See also ==
- Demographics of Turkey
