= 2000 Turkish census =

The 2000 Turkish census was held in 2000 and recorded the population and demographic details of every settlement in Turkey.
