= 2010 Turkish census =

The 2010 Turkish census was held in 2010 or 2011 and recorded the population and demographic details of every settlement in Turkey.
