= 1927 Turkish census =

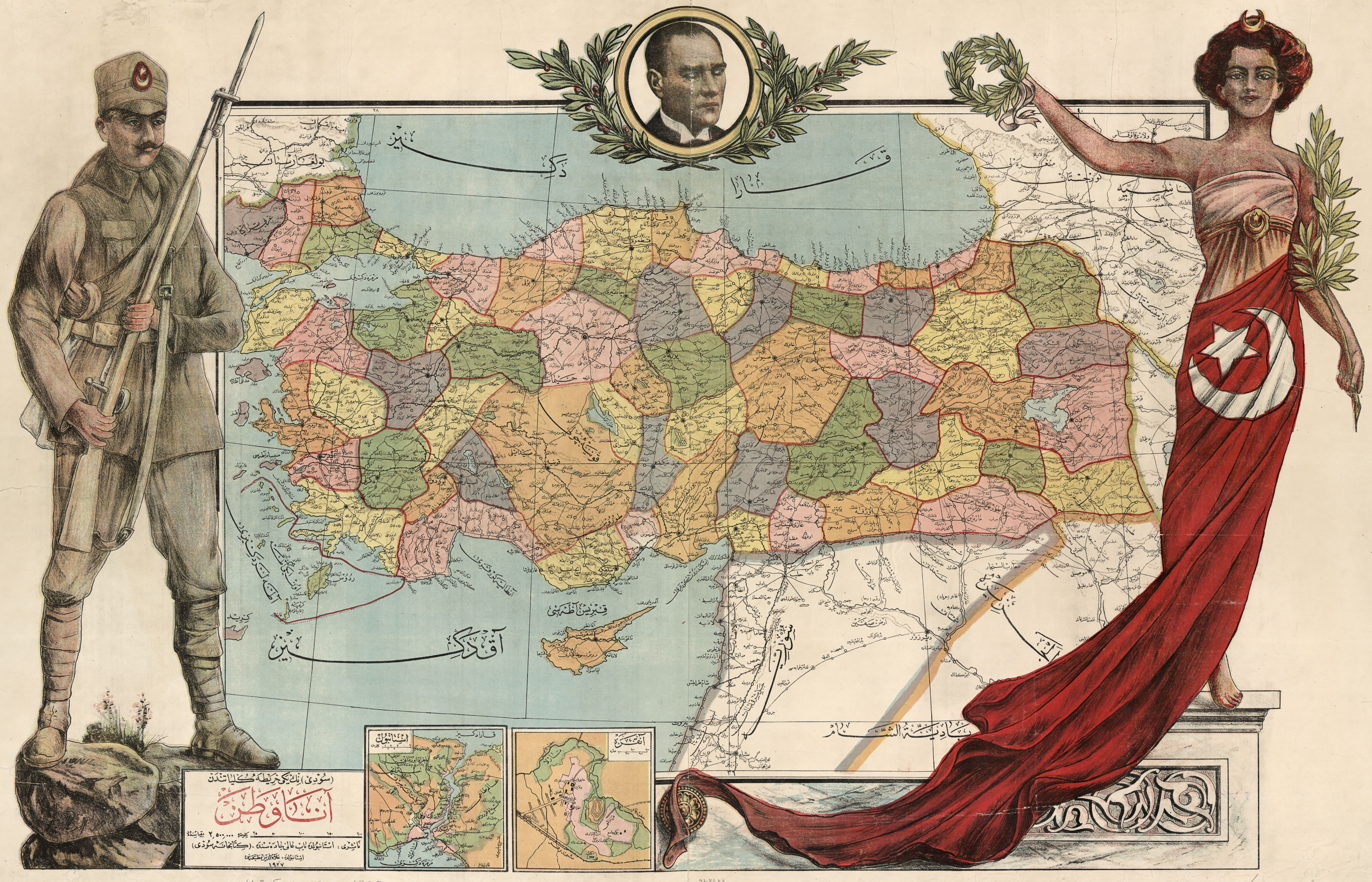
Turkish administrative divisions in 1927.

The 1927 Turkish census (Turkish: Umûmî Nüfûs Tahrîri, French: Recensement général de la population) was held on the 28th of September 1927. The population of Turkey was 13,649,945. The census covered 63 vilâyet, 328 kazâ and 39,901 villages. It was the first census conducted in the newly established Republic of Turkey.

== Population by vilâyet ==
1927 Turkish census
		Total	Urban	Rural
	Türkiye	13,648,270	3,305,879	10,342,391
22	Adana	227,718	81,951	145,767
18	Afyonkarahisar	259,377	45,103	214,274
47	Aksaray	127,031	11,860	115,171
51	Amasya	114,884	30,297	84,587
5	Ankara	404,720	98,835	305,885
29	Antalya	204,372	35,263	169,109
60	Artvin	90,066	3,502	86,564
26	Aydın	212,541	42,440	170,101
4	Balıkesir	421,066	93,594	327,472
56	Bayazıt (Ağrı)	104,586	14,442	90,144
52	Bilecik	113,660	15,927	97,733
59	Bitlis	90,631	17,638	72,993
23	Bolu	218,246	21,929	196,317
61	Burdur	83,614	18,006	65,608
6	Bursa	401,595	114,741	286,854
55	Cebelibereket (Osmaniye)	107,694	21,403	86,291
35	Çanakkale	181,735	35,682	146,053
41	Çankırı	157,219	13,909	143,310
20	Çorum	247,926	43,599	204,327
21	Denizli	245,048	41,292	203,756
32	Diyarbekir	194,316	46,595	147,721
43	Edirne	150,840	48,376	102,464
25	Elâziz (Elazığ)	213,777	35,253	178,524
45	Erzincan	132,325	21,051	111,274
15	Erzurum	270,426	40,822	229,604
42	Eskişehir	154,332	41,565	112,767
24	Gaziayıntap (Gaziantep)	215,762	76,721	139,041
40	Giresun	165,033	21,145	143,888
49	Gümüşane	122,231	12,864	109,367
63	Hakâri (Hakkâri)	24,980	1,884	23,096
58	İçel (Silifke)	90,940	8,595	82,345
44	Isparta	144,437	36,711	107,726
1	İstanbul	794,444	695,813	98,631
2	İzmir	526,005	254,061	271,944
28	Kars	204,846	26,806	178,040
8	Kastamonu	336,501	37,915	298,586
19	Kayseri	251,370	59,969	191,401
53	Kırklareli	108,989	24,736	84,253
48	Kırşehir	126,901	21,130	105,771
13	Kocaeli	286,600	52,644	233,956
3	Konya	504,384	101,156	403,228
11	Kütahya	302,426	52,551	249,875
10	Malatya	306,882	46,808	260,074
7	Manisa	374,013	109,426	264,587
33	Maraş	186,855	36,653	150,202
34	Mardin	183,471	42,710	140,761
50	Mersin	119,107	43,043	76,064
36	Muğla	175,390	28,110	147,280
39	Niğde	166,056	38,810	127,246
31	Ordu	202,354	16,156	186,198
37	Rize	171,657	16,978	154,679
14	Samsun	274,065	55,497	218,568
57	Siirt	102,433	22,681	79,752
38	Sinop	169,965	13,440	156,525
9	Sıvas	329,551	55,845	273,706
54	Şebinkarahisar	108,735	12,994	95,741
46	Tekirdağ	131,446	34,993	96,453
17	Tokat	263,063	51,487	211,576
12	Trabzon	290,303	32,789	257,514
30	Urfa	203,595	59,239	144,356
62	Van	75,329	13,749	61,580
27	Yozgat	209,497	18,012	191,485
16	Zonguldak	268,909	33,516	235,393

== Languages ==
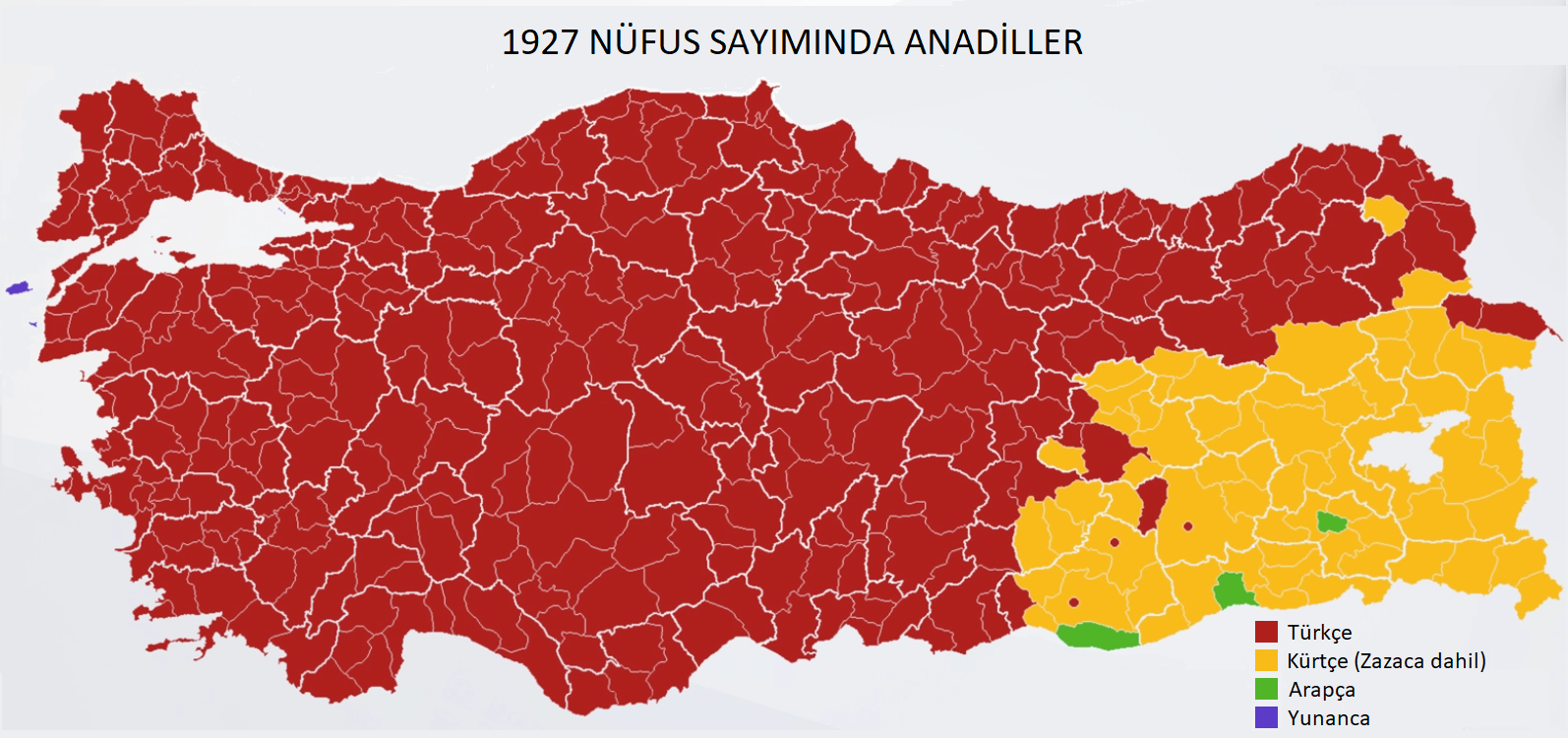
Predominant language by district in 1927 Turkish Census

Mother tongues in Turkey in the 1927 Turkish census
Language	Population	%
Turkish	11,778,810	86.42
Kurdish	1,184,446	8.69
Arabic	134,273	0.98
Greek	119,822	0.88
Circassian	95,901	0.70
Jewish languages	68,900	0.51
Armenian	64,745	0.48
Albanian	21,774	0.16
Bulgarian	20,554	0.15
Tatar	11,465	0.08
French	8,456	0.06
Italian	7,248	0.05
English	1,938	0.01
Persian	1,687	0.01
others	110,469	0.81
Total	13,630,488	100

=== Maps ===
Provinces (vilayeti) in Turkey by percentage of spoken first language:

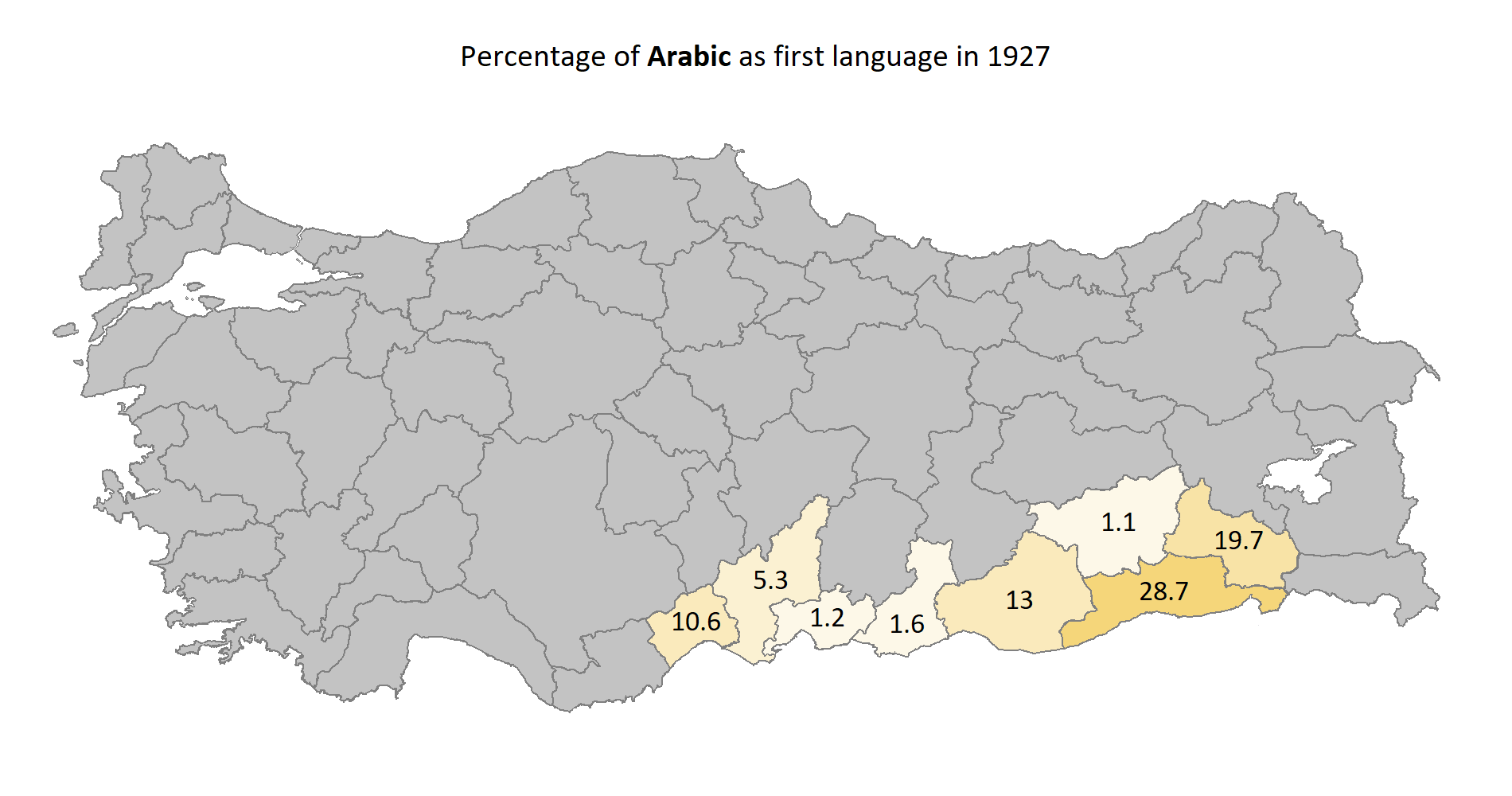
Arabic

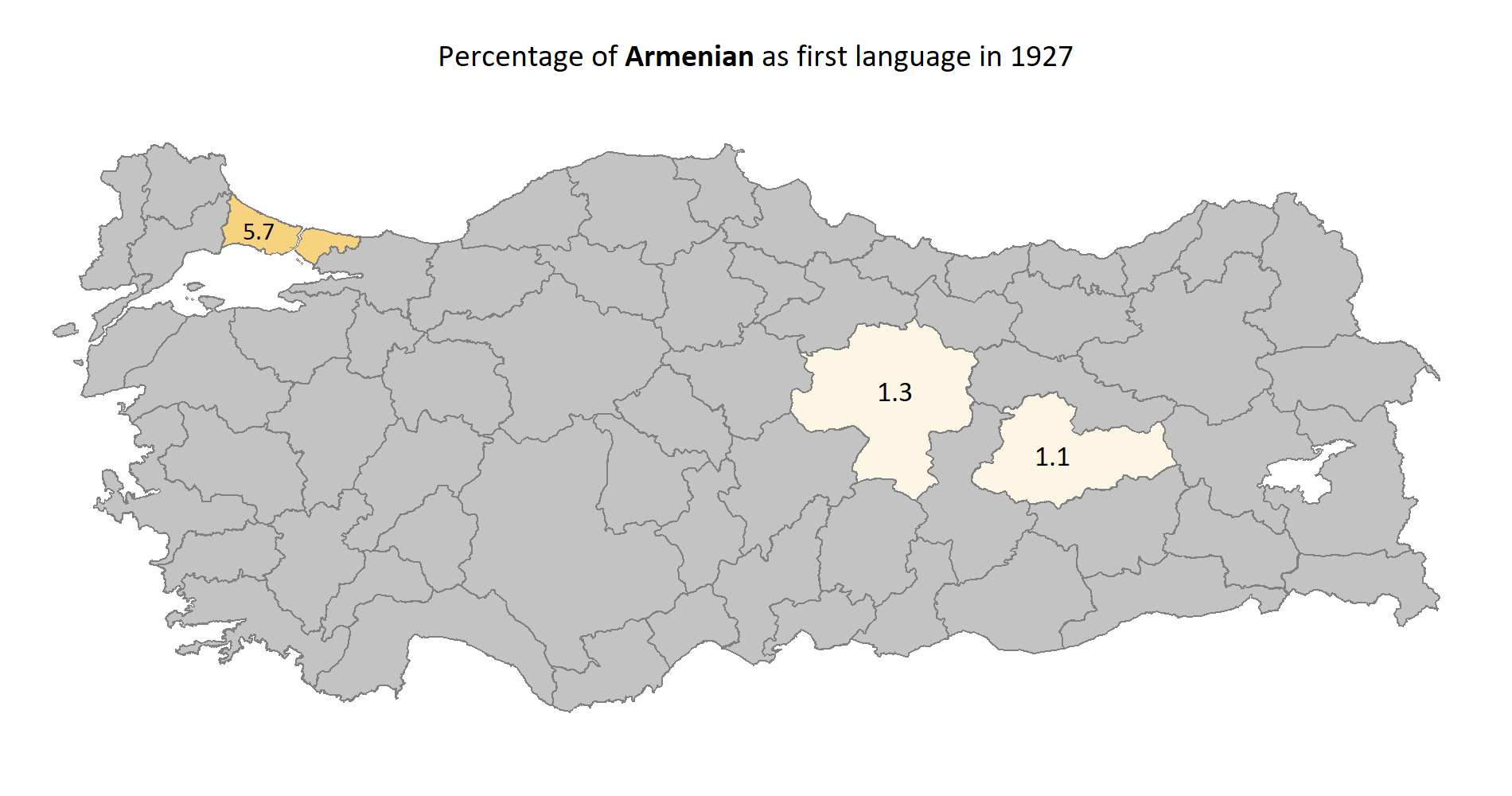
Armenian

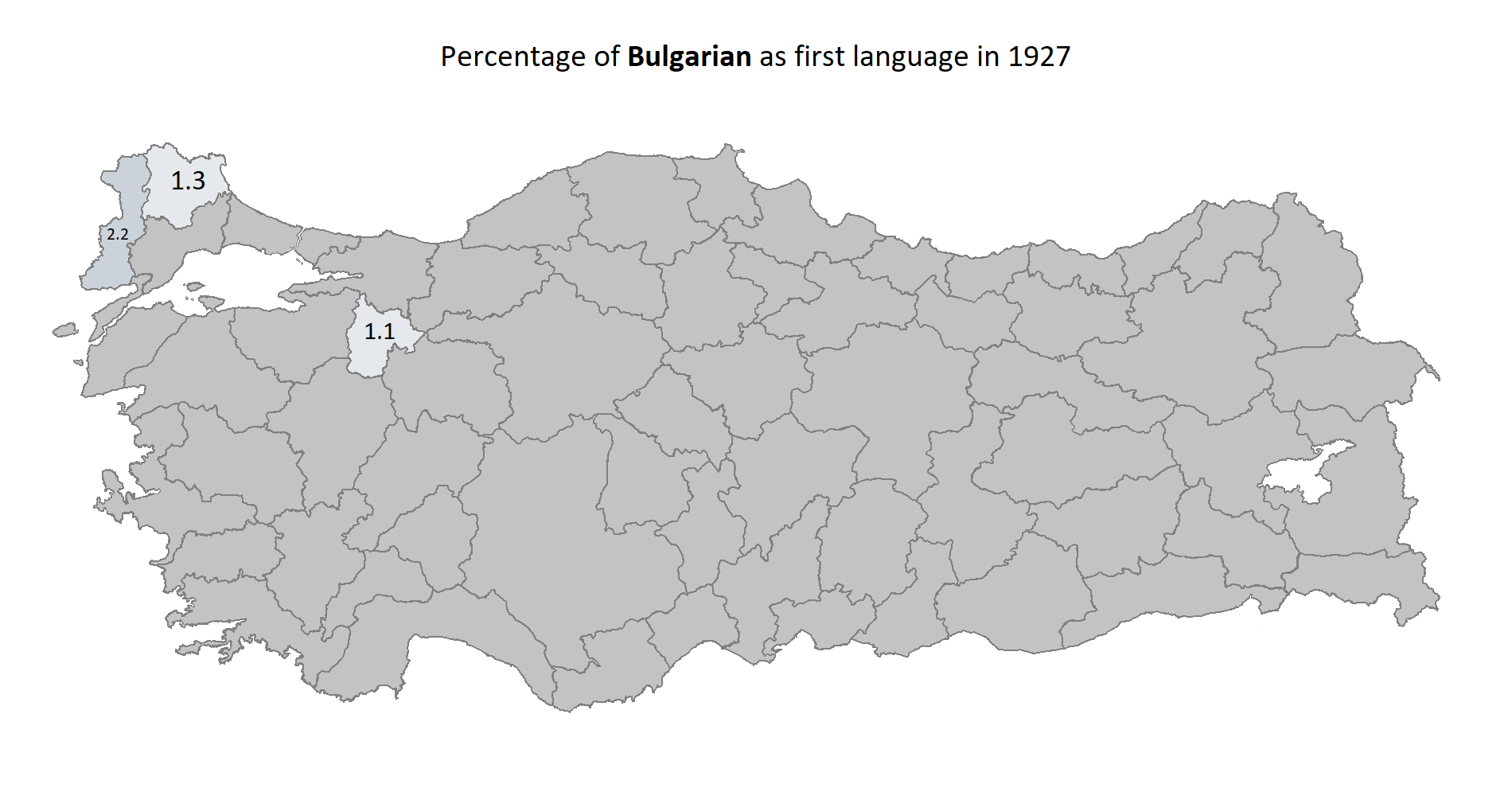
Bulgarian

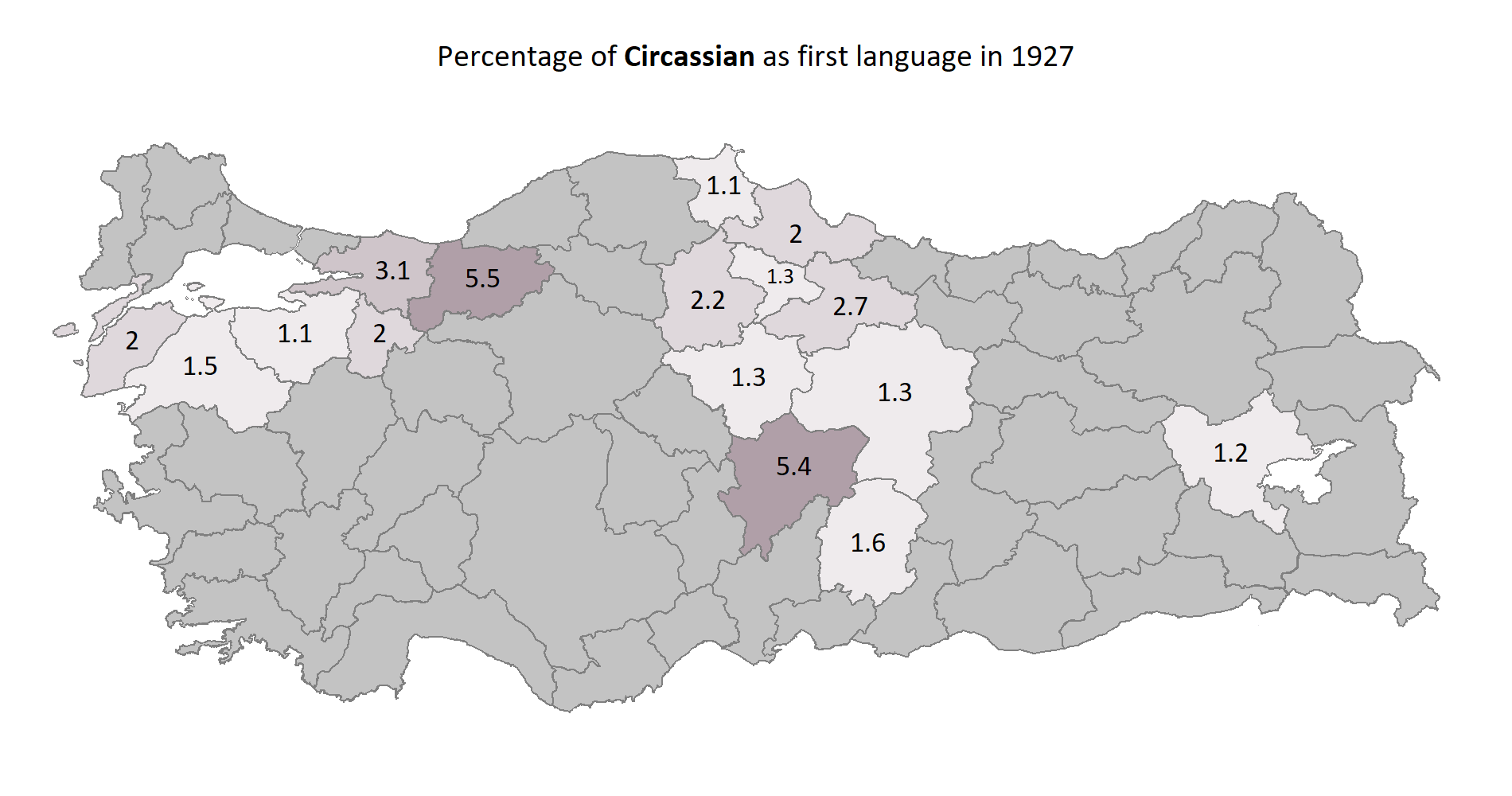
Circassian

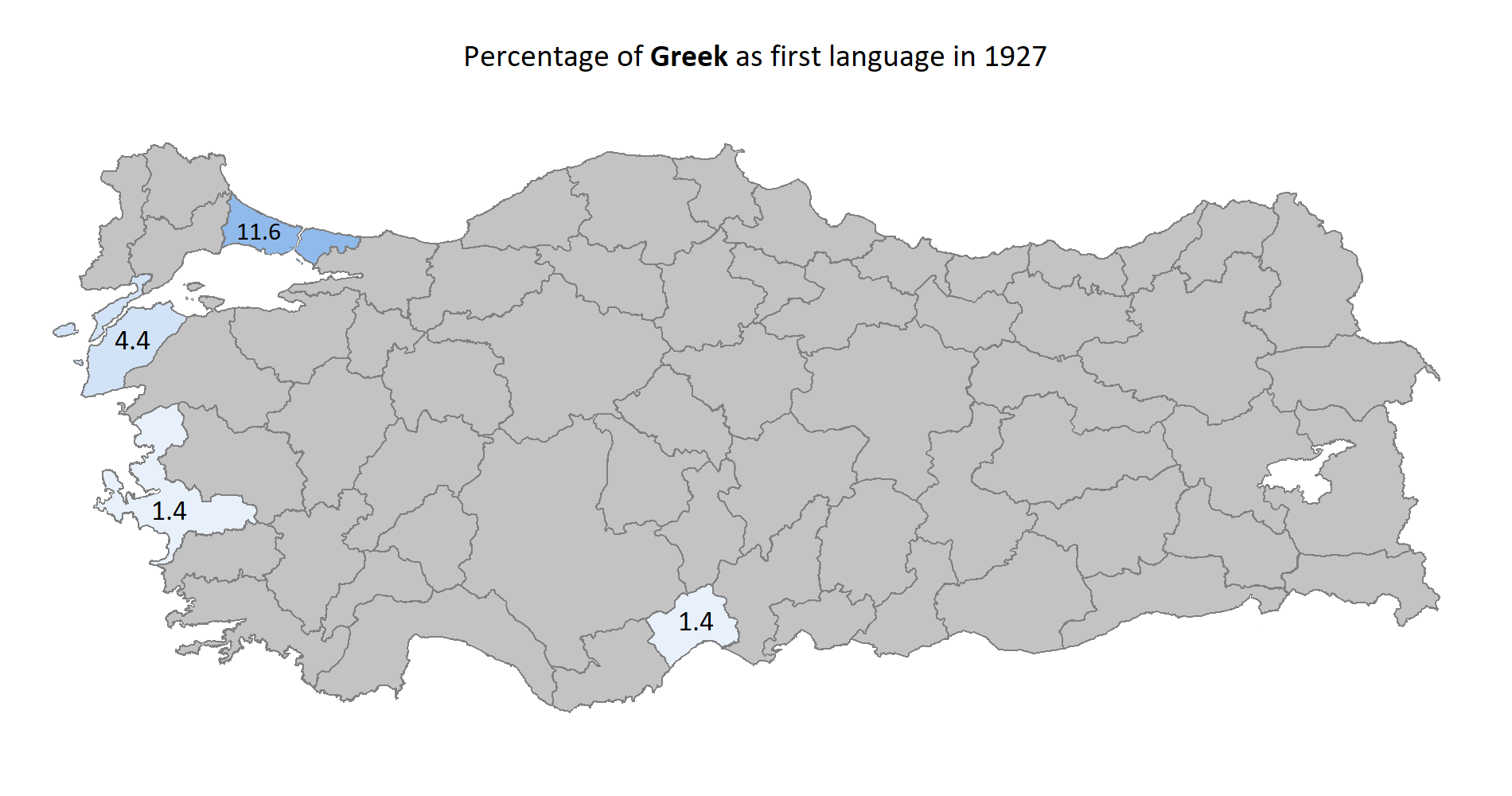
Greek

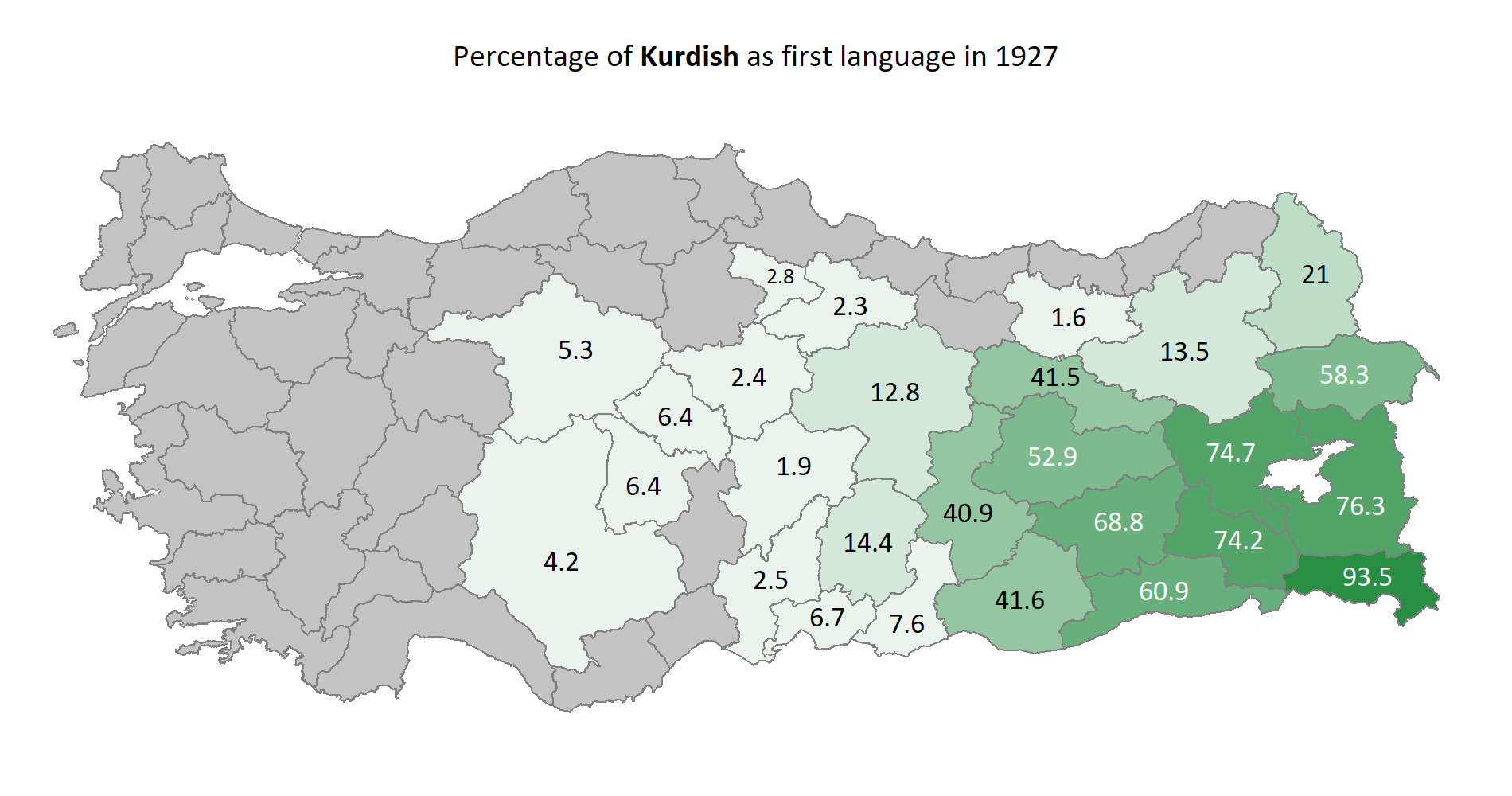
Kurdish

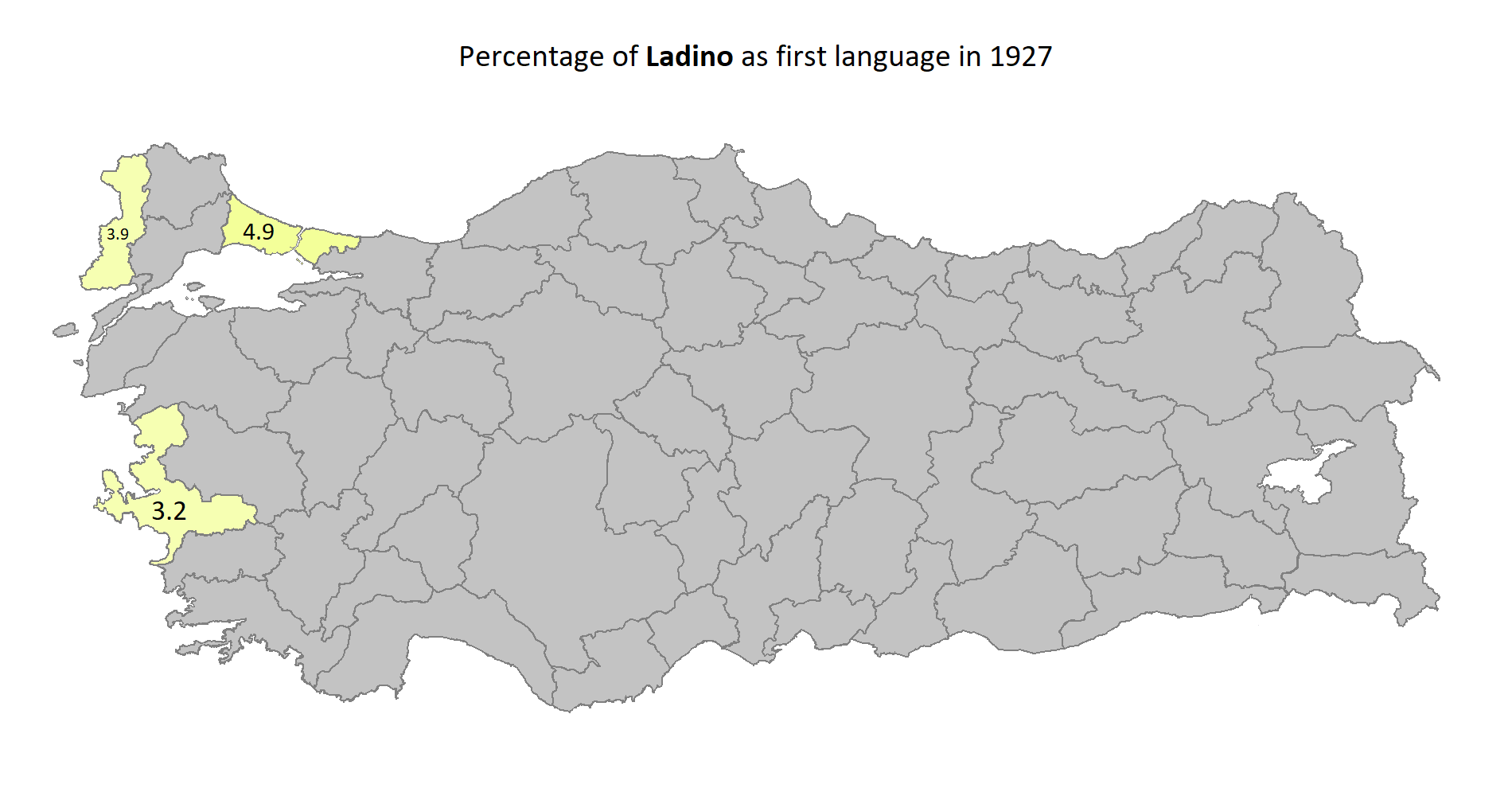
Ladino

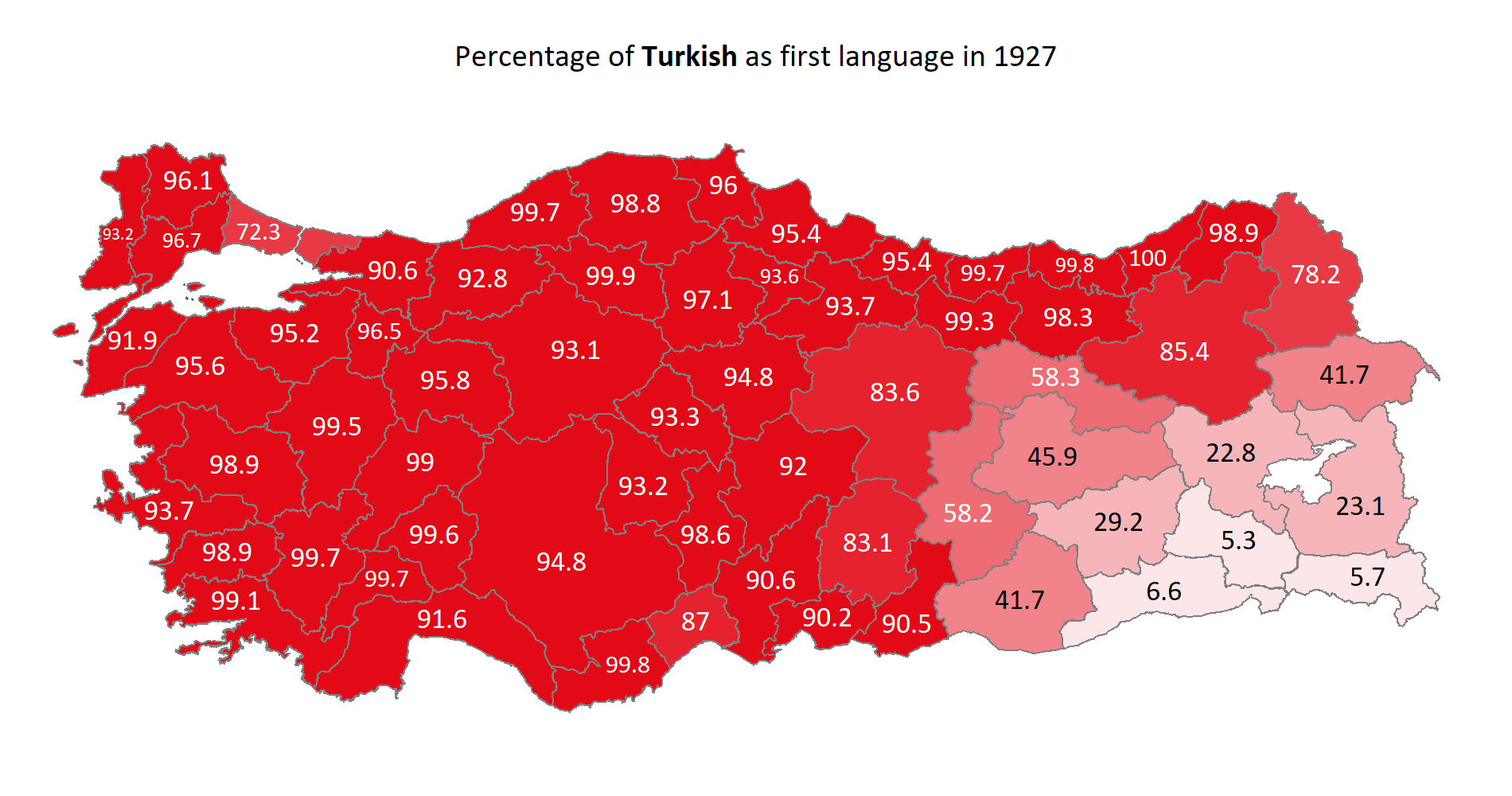
Turkish

== Sources ==
- Umumî Nüfus Tahriri FASÎKÜL I
- Umumî Nüfus Tahriri FASÎKÜL II
- Umumî Nüfus Tahriri FASÎKÜL III
