= Zonguldak =

- Municipality
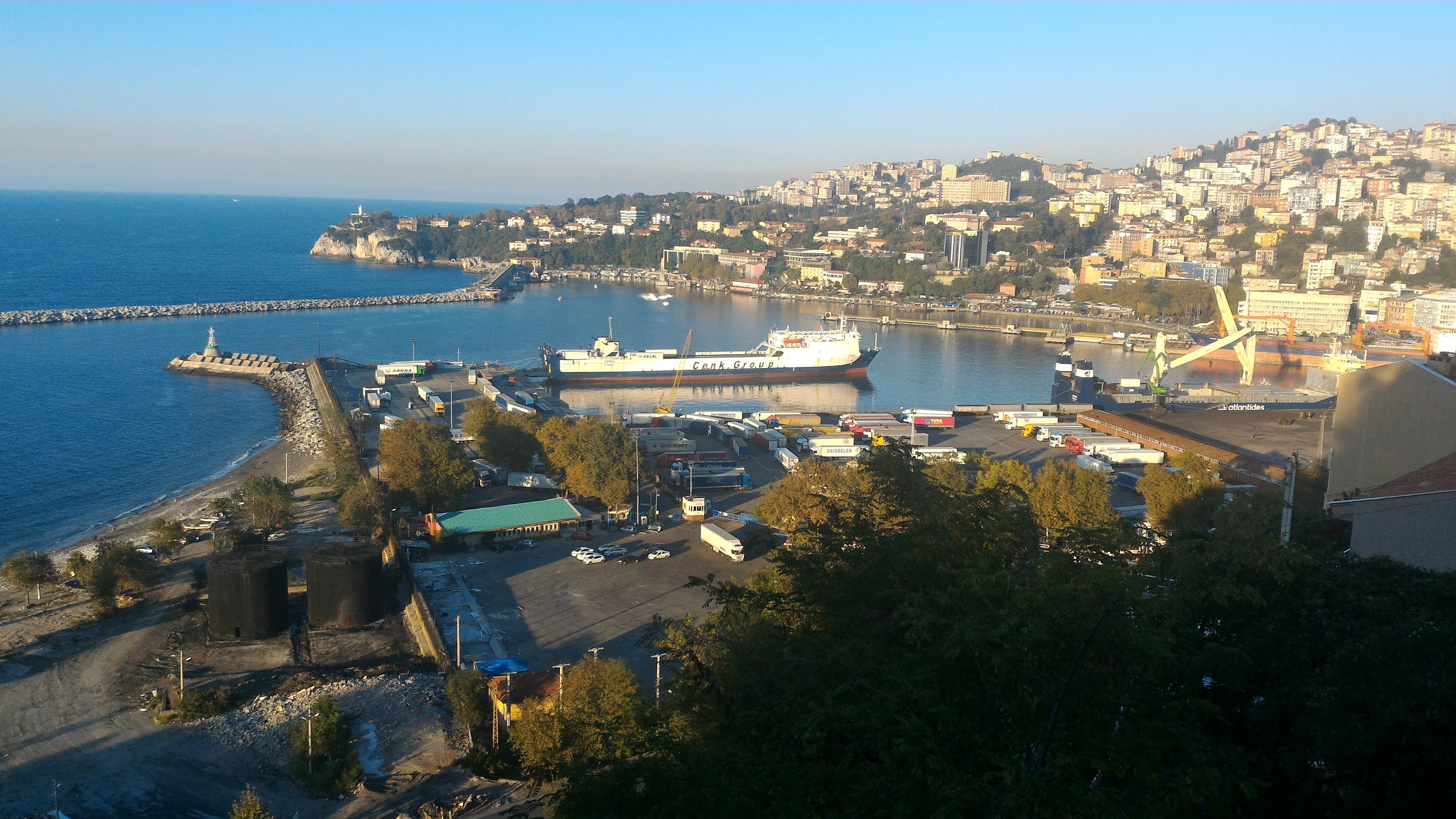
- Port of Zonguldak

- Coat of arms

- Location within Turkey
- Coordinates: 41°27′23″N 31°47′55″E
- Country: Turkey
- Province: Zonguldak
- District: Zonguldak

Government
  - Mayor: Tahsin Erdem (CHP)
- Elevation: 60 m (200 ft)
- Population (2022): 101,749
- Time zone: UTC+3 (TRT)
- Postal code: 67000
- Area code: 0372
- Climate: Cfa
- Website: www.zonguldak.bel.tr

Zonguldak (Turkish pronunciation: [zoŋˈguɫdak]) is a city of about 100,000 people in the Black Sea region of Turkey. It is the seat of Zonguldak Province and Zonguldak District. It was established in 1849 as a port town for the nearby coal mines in Ereğli. The current mayor is Tahsin Erdem, representing the CHP.

== Etymology ==
There are several different theories concerning the origin of the city's name:

- That it comes from Zone Geul-Dagh, the name given to the area by French and Belgian mining companies from French "zone" and a French spelling of Turkish Göldağı ('Lake Mountain'), the highest mountain in the vicinity of the Devrek district.
- That the name came from Turkish zongalık which means "swamp", or zongura.
- That the name may derive from the name of the nearby ancient settlement of Sandaraca or Sandarake (in Ancient Greek Σανδαράκη).
- That the name may have come from "jungle" (which the French entrepreneurs called the area due to its uneven wooded geography) plus Turkish dağ 'mountain'.

In a 1920 report, the British Foreign Office spelled Zonguldak Zunguldak.

The city is a major centre of chestnut honey production, with most of Turkey's output originating from the region. The city is nicknamed kestane balının diyarı (lit. 'chestnut honey realm') as a result.

== History ==
The port city of Zonguldak suffered a heavy bombardment by the Russians during World War I, according to the caption of a Lubok popular print.

In 1920 the port was under the control of the Heraclea Coal Company. The northern part of the bay featured a man-made harbor, for steamship use. At that time, they had two cranes which distributed coal to exporting vessels. There is a mining museum.

== Climate ==
According to the Köppen climate classification, Zonguldak has a humid subtropical climate (Cfa), though it was, until recently, considered to have an oceanic climate (Cfb), with its warmest month being well below the 22 °C threshold. In recent decades climate change and the city's urban heat island has warmed the city enough to change its classification. Summers are warm, the average temperature is around 22.5 °C in July and August. Winters are cool, the average temperature is around 6 °C in January and February. Precipitation is frequent, while it is generally heaviest in autumn and early winter, lightest (although still frequent) in spring. Snow is sporadic in winter, but is heavy once it occurs.

The water temperature is cool to mild and fluctuates between 8 °C and 20 °C throughout the year.

Climate data for Zonguldak (1991–2020, extremes 1939–2023)
Month	Jan	Feb	Mar	Apr	May	Jun	Jul	Aug	Sep	Oct	Nov	Dec	Year
Record high °C (°F)	24.1 (75.4)	26.7 (80.1)	31.7 (89.1)	33.6 (92.5)	36.7 (98.1)	40.5 (104.9)	39.5 (103.1)	39.8 (103.6)	36.2 (97.2)	35.9 (96.6)	30.9 (87.6)	28.1 (82.6)	40.5 (104.9)
Mean daily maximum °C (°F)	9.2 (48.6)	9.7 (49.5)	11.7 (53.1)	15.2 (59.4)	19.3 (66.7)	23.6 (74.5)	25.8 (78.4)	26.2 (79.2)	23.2 (73.8)	19.2 (66.6)	15.2 (59.4)	11.5 (52.7)	17.5 (63.5)
Daily mean °C (°F)	6.3 (43.3)	6.4 (43.5)	8.1 (46.6)	11.5 (52.7)	15.7 (60.3)	19.9 (67.8)	22.4 (72.3)	22.7 (72.9)	19.5 (67.1)	15.7 (60.3)	11.7 (53.1)	8.3 (46.9)	14.0 (57.2)
Mean daily minimum °C (°F)	3.8 (38.8)	3.6 (38.5)	5.2 (41.4)	8.3 (46.9)	12.6 (54.7)	16.5 (61.7)	18.8 (65.8)	19.2 (66.6)	16.1 (61.0)	12.8 (55.0)	8.9 (48.0)	5.7 (42.3)	11.0 (51.8)
Record low °C (°F)	−7.7 (18.1)	−8.0 (17.6)	−6.4 (20.5)	−2.1 (28.2)	3.0 (37.4)	8.8 (47.8)	11.2 (52.2)	10.0 (50.0)	5.9 (42.6)	1.8 (35.2)	−3.2 (26.2)	−7.4 (18.7)	−8.0 (17.6)
Average precipitation mm (inches)	127.7 (5.03)	93.9 (3.70)	96.4 (3.80)	57.1 (2.25)	59.5 (2.34)	83.0 (3.27)	69.7 (2.74)	81.6 (3.21)	125.9 (4.96)	147.5 (5.81)	134.5 (5.30)	161.8 (6.37)	1,238.6 (48.76)
Average precipitation days	17.63	15.5	15.03	12.1	10.63	9.37	6.7	6.23	9.4	12.67	12.77	17.93	145.96
Average relative humidity (%)	72.4	72.3	70.5	71.2	74.9	74.6	75.6	76.3	74.7	76.4	71.5	71.1	73.5
Mean monthly sunshine hours	60.5	72.5	107.1	149.7	189.7	241.5	275.4	255.7	187.7	128.0	87.6	62.3	1,781.7
Mean daily sunshine hours	2.0	2.6	3.5	5.1	6.3	8.1	8.9	8.3	6.3	4.2	3.0	2.1	5.0
Source 1: Turkish State Meteorological Service
Source 2: NOAA (humidity, sun 1991-2020)

== Health ==
It was determined that coal-related lung diseases are more common than normal. During the quarantine period in Turkey, Zonguldak was also quarantined in addition to the metropolitan cities.

== Economy ==
Jobs in coal in Turkey are being lost and in 2020 the EBRD proposed a just transition. However a 2021 study said the city was unprepared for coal-phase out. In 2024 a local journalist alleged that hundreds of Afghans were being employed in illegal coal mines, and in 2024 a court case re the death of an Afghan was ongoing.

== Transportation ==
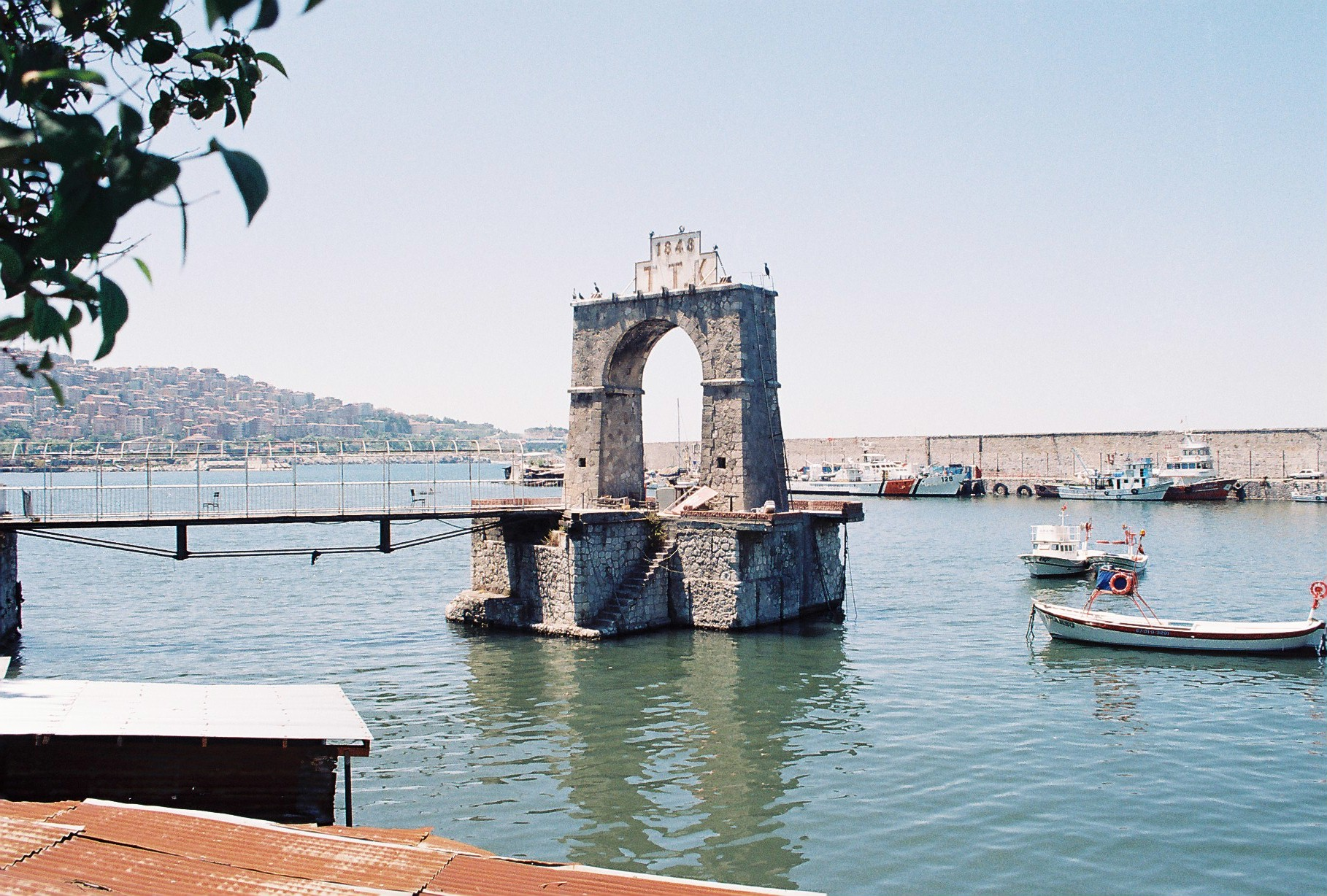
Zonguldak old coal Port constructed in 1848

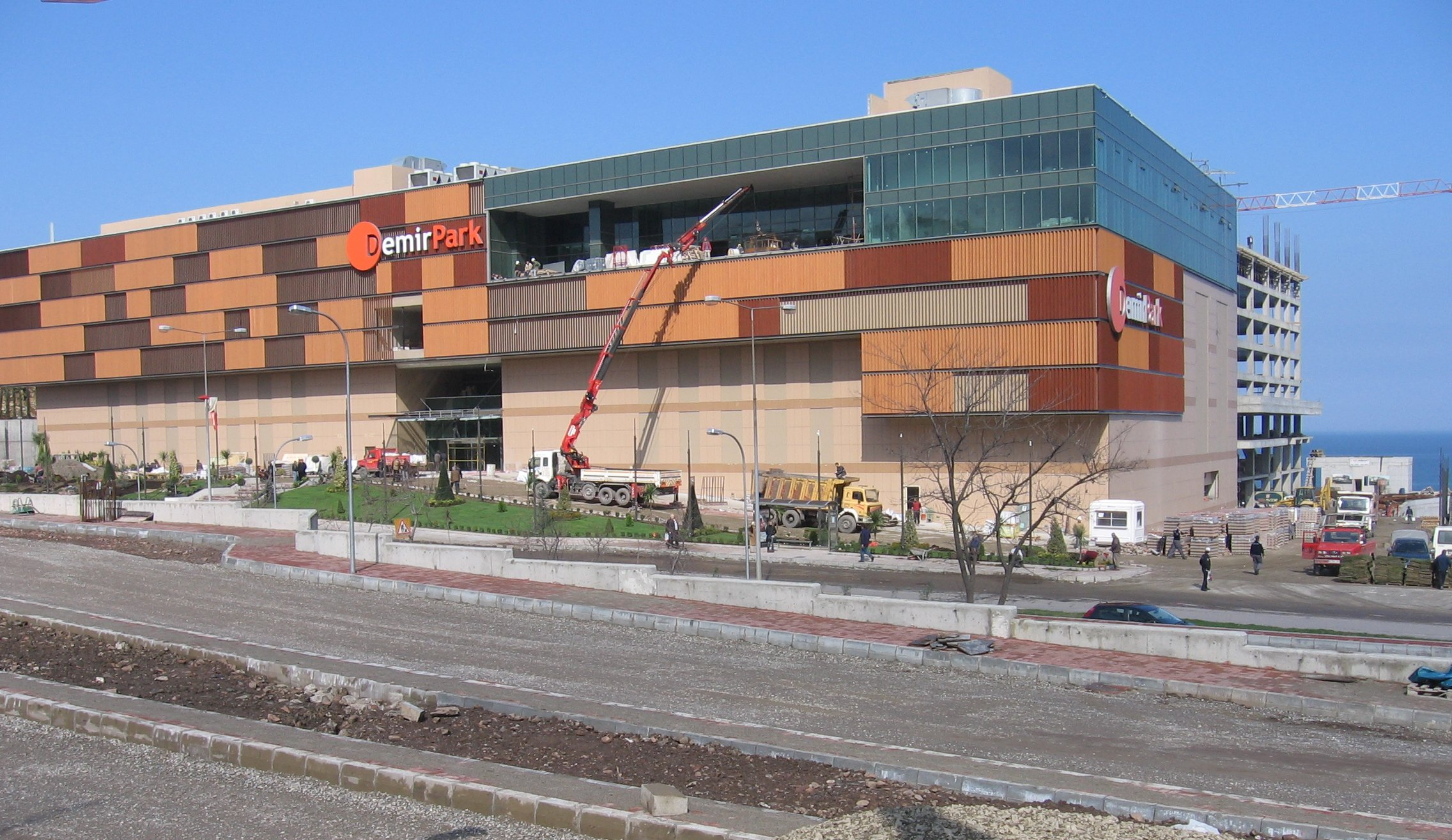
Construction work in the city

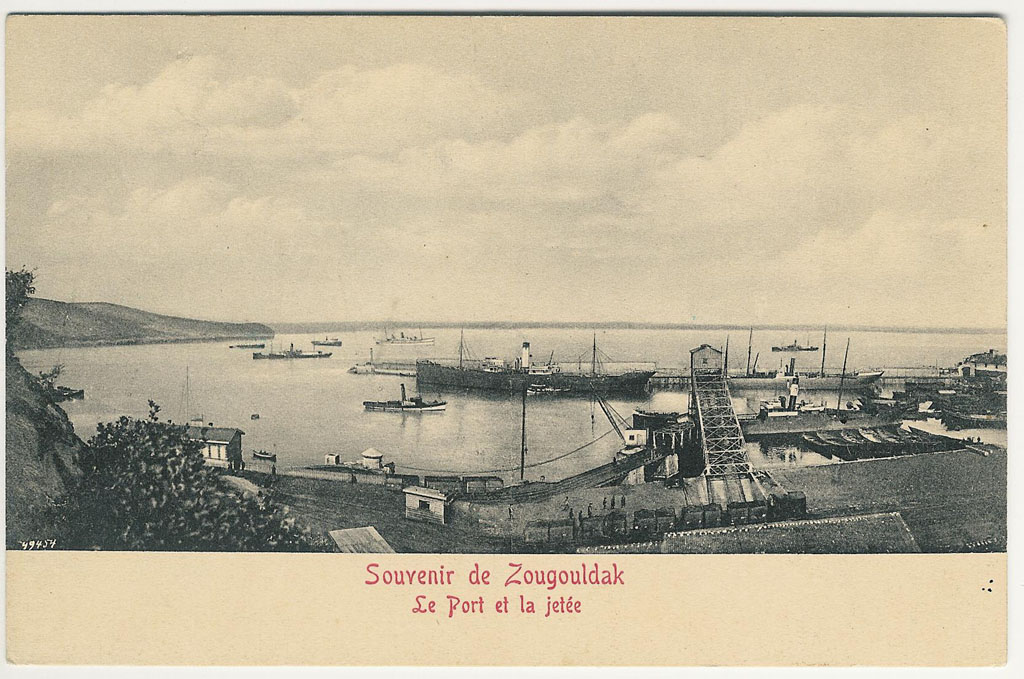
Zonguldak port and breakwater, Turkey Ottoman era postcard

The city is the terminus of a railway line to Irmak, with the terminating station Zonguldak Railway Station built in 1937.

== International relations ==
Zonguldak is twinned with:

- Brindisi, Apulia, Italy
- Castrop-Rauxel, North Rhine-Westphalia, Germany
- Kherson, Kherson Oblast, Ukraine
- Monfalcone, Friuli-Venezia Giulia, Italy

== Notable people ==
- Enrico Braggiotti - Turkish-born Monegasque banker
- Ergün Penbe - Turkish former footballer
- Murat Boz - Turkish singer-songwriter and actor
- Nilgün Efes - Turkish entrepreneur and journalist

== See also ==
- Zonguldak basin
