= Asarlık Hills =

Asarlık Hills Asarlık Tepeler
- Hill
- Location of Asarlık Hills in Turkey.
- Coordinates: 40°19′02″N 31°24′50″E
- Location: Asarlık, Nallıhan, Ankara Province, Turkey

Area
  - Total: 52.374 hectares (129.42 acres)

Asarlık Hills (Turkish: Asarlık Tepeler) are hills located in Ankara Province, central Turkey. The area is a registered natural monument of the country.

It is 24 km (15 mi) away from the center of Nallıhan district in Ankara Province, and situated in Asarlık location within the boundaries of Danişment and Uzunöz villages. The area constitutes rare examples of cuesta geomorphology formed by the abrasion of clay layers with different resistances. It covers an area of 52.374 ha (129.42 acres).

Being of both scientific and visual interest, the area with hills was registered a natural monument on August 22, 1994.
