= Armutlu =

Armutlu or Armudlu may refer to:

== Places ==
=== Armenia ===
- Tandzut, Armavir, formerly Armutlu, a town in the Armavir Province
- Tufashen, formerly Armutlu, a town in the Shirak Province

=== Azerbaijan ===
- Armudlu, Kalbajar, a village in the Kalbajar Rayon
- Armudlu, Qakh, a village in the Qakh Rayon
- Armudlu, Qubadli, a village in the Qubadli Rayon
- Armudlu, Shusha, a village in the Shusha Rayon

=== Bulgaria ===
- Armutlu, former name of Krushari, a village and municipality in Dobrich Province

=== Iran ===
- Armudlu, Iran, a village in North Khorasan Province
- Armutlu, Iran, a village in Zanjan Province

=== Romania ===
- Turda, formerly Armutlia, a village in Mihai Bravu commune, Tulcea County
- Periș, formerly Armutlia, a former village in Independenţa commune, Constanța County

=== Turkey ===
- Armutlu, Aksaray, a village in the central district of Aksaray Province
- Armutlu, Aydın, a village in the central district of Aydın Province
- Armutlu, Bayburt, a village in the central district of Bayburt Province
- Armutlu, Çay, a village in the Çay district of Afyonkarahisar Province
- Armutlu, Çermik
- Armutlu, Elmalı, a village in the Elmalı district of Antalya Province
- Armutlu, Gönen, a village
- Armutlu, İspir
- Armutlu, Kemalpaşa, a town in the Kemalpaşa district of İzmir Province
- Armutlu, Kepsut, a village
- Armutlu, Kozluk, a village in the Kozluk district of Batman Province
- Armutlu, Suluova, a village in the Suluova district of Amasya Province
- Armutlu, Yalova, a town and district in Yalova Province

== Landform ==
- Armutlu Peninsula, Marmara Sea in Turkey
