= Yenice Dam =

- Location within Turkey
- Country: Turkey
- Location: Yenice
- Coordinates: 40°03′49.84″N 30°51′26.33″E
- Construction began: 1985
- Opening date: 2000

Dam and spillways
- Impounds: Sakarya River
- Length: 41 m (135 ft)

Reservoir
- Total capacity: 57,600,000 m^{3} (46,700 acre⋅ft)

Power Station
- Installed capacity: 38 MW

Yenice Dam is a dam on the Sakarya River near the Yenice neighbourhood of Nallıhan district on the border of Eskişehir and Ankara provinces of Turkey. It houses a 38 MW hydroelectric power station. It was constructed between 1985 and 2000. The development was backed by the Turkish State Hydraulic Works.

== See also ==
- Gökçekaya Dam – next upstream
- Sarıyar Dam – upstream of Gökçekaya Dam
- List of dams and reservoirs in Turkey
