= Ozan =

Ozan may refer to:

== Companies ==
- Ozan Lumber Company, a former company based in Arkansas

== People ==
- Ozan (singer), an itinerant poet, poet-singer (similar to "bard", "balladeer", or "troubadour") in Turkic traditions, predating the term ashik. Some performed Oğuzname.

=== Given name ===
"Ozan" in the meaning "poet-singer" may be used as a Turkish male given name.

- Ozan Akbaba (born 1982), Turkish actor
- Ozan Baris (born 2004), American tennis player
- Ozan Çolakoğlu (born 1972), Turkish composer, songwriter, and music producer
- Ozan Demirbağ (born 2008), Turkish footballer
- Ozan Doğulu (born 1972), Turkish musician
- Ozan Dolunay (born 1990), Turkish actor
- Ozan Güven (born 1975), Turkish actor
- Ozan İpek (born 1986), Turkish footballer
- Ozan Kabak (born 2000), Turkish footballer
- Ozan Kökçü (born 1998), Azerbaijani footballer
- Ozan Marsh (1920–1992), American pianist
- Ozan Musluoğlu (born 1977), Turkish musician and former member of the ska band Athena
- Ozan Anton Odabasi (born 1995), Turkish-Finnish basketballer
- Ozan Evrim Özenç (born 1993), Turkish footballer
- Ozan Özkan (born 1984), Turkish footballer
- Ozan Papaker (born 1996), Turkish footballer
- Ozan Tufan (born 1995), Turkish footballer
- Ozan Tügen (born 1976), Turkish musician
- Ozan Varol (born 1981), Turkish author and law professor
- Ozan Yanar (born 1987), Finnish politician and parliamentarian
- Ozan Yildirim (born 1992), Swiss musician
- Ozan Yılmaz (born 1988), Turkish-German footballer

=== Epithet ===
- Arif Şirin (1949–2019), commonly known as Ozan Arif, Turkish lyricist, composer, singer, and bağlama performer

=== Surname ===
- Can Ozan (born 1990), Turkish musician and record producer
- Ozerk Ozan (born 1979), Norwegian entrepreneur
- Pepe Ozan (1939–2013), Argentine sculptor and artistic director

== Places ==
- Ozan, Arkansas, a town in the United States
- Ozan, Ain, a commune in the Ain department in France
- Ozan, original name of Ozanköy, Nallıhan, a village in Turkey
- Ozan, Gölbaşı, a village in Adıyaman Province, Turkey
- Ōzan Kofun Cluster, burial mounds in Fukui Prefecture, Japan
- Ozan Mosque, mosque in Ganja, Azerbaijan
- Ozan, Nallıhan, town in Ankara Province, Turkey
- Ozan, Iran (disambiguation), places in Iran
- Ozan Formation, geologic formation in Arkansas, Oklahoma and Texas
- Ozan, Saraykent, town in Yozgat Province, Turkey

== See also ==
- Ozanköy (disambiguation)
