= Yenice =

Yenice (literally "new town," formerly also written Yenidje or Yenidze) may refer to:

== Places ==
=== Turkey ===
==== Ankara Province ====
- Yenice, Çubuk, a village in Çubuk district, Ankara Province
- Yenice, Nallıhan, a village in Nallıhan district, Ankara Province
- Yenice, Polatlı, a village in Polatlı district, Ankara Province
- Yenice Dam, a dam in Turkey, near Yenice, Nallıhan
- Sindiren, Haymana, formerly known as Yenice

==== Antalya Province ====
- Yenice, Alanya, a village in Alanya district, Antalya Province
- Yenice, Gündoğmuş, a village in Gündoğmuş district, Antalya Province

==== Aydın Province ====
- Yenice, Bozdoğan, a village in Bozdoğan district, Aydın Province
- Yenice, Karacasu, a village in Karacasu district, Aydın Province

==== Mersin Province ====
- Yenice, Gülnar, a village in Gülnar district, Mersin Province
- Yenice, Tarsus, a town in Mersin Province
- Yenice railway station, a railway station in Yenice, Mersin

==== Other provinces ====
- Yenice, Akçakoca
- Yenice, Adıyaman, a village in Adıyaman district, Adıyaman Province
- Yenice, Ağaçören, a village in Ağaçören district, Aksaray Province
- Yenice, Alaca
- Yenice, Bandırma
- Yenice, Bayramiç
- Yenice, Bismil
- Yenice, Büyükorhan
- Yenice, Çanakkale, a district of Çanakkale Province
- Yenice, Çorum
- Yenice, Çüngüş
- Yenice, Dernekpazarı, a village in Dernekpazarı district, Trabzon Province
- Yenice, Dikili, a village in Dikili district, İzmir Province
- Yenice, Gercüş, a village in Gercüş district, Batman Province
- Yenice, Giresun, a town in Giresun Province
- Yenice, İhsaniye, a village in İhsaniye district, Afyonkarahisar Province
- Yenice, İskilip
- Yenice, Karakoçan
- Yenice, Karabük, a district of Karabük Province
- Yenice, Karataş, a village in Karataş district, Adana Province
- Yenice, Lapseki
- Yenice, Merzifon, a village in Merzifon district, Amasya Province
- Yenice, Orta
- Yenice, Pınarhisar, a village in Pınarhisar district, Kırklareli Province
- Yenice, Sur
- Yenice, Yağlıdere, a village in Yağlıdere District, Giresun Province
- Yeniceköy, Bursa, a town in Bursa Province
- Yenice, Yaprakli is a village in Yaprakli district of Çankiri province
- Yenice, Yapraklı

=== Greece ===
- Giannitsa, Pella regional unit, formerly Γενιτσά, Yenice, or Vardar Yenicesi
- Genisea, Xanthi regional unit, formerly Yenice/Yenidje/Yenidze or Yenice Karasu, and famous for its tobacco
- Dovras, Imathia, whose community Agios Georgios was formerly named Γιάννισσα/Γιάννισα
- Vasiliko, Ioannina (formerly Γιάννιστα), Ioannina regional unit

=== Azerbaijan ===
- Yenicə, Agdash
- Yenicə, Yevlakh

== Other uses ==
- Yenice Conference, a meeting between Turkish President İsmet İnönü and British Prime Minister Winston Churchill during World War II, near Yenice, Tarsus
- Battle of Yenidje between the Greek and Ottoman Armies, near Giannitsa, Pella, during the First Balkan War (1912)
- Yenidze, a former cigarette factory in Dresden, Germany
- Yenidje Tobacco Company Limited, a former U.K. tobacco company
