= Çayırhan =

- Neighbourhood
- Location in Turkey Çayırhan (Turkey Central Anatolia)
- Coordinates: 40°06′N 31°41′E
- Country: Turkey
- Province: Ankara
- District: Nallıhan
- Elevation: 500 m (1,600 ft)
- Population (2022): 8,156
- Time zone: UTC+3 (TRT)
- Postal code: 06922
- Area code: 0312

Çayırhan is a neighbourhood in the municipality and district of Nallıhan, Ankara Province, Turkey. Its population is 8,156 (2022). Before the 2013 reorganisation, it was a town (belde).

== Geography ==
Çayırhan is situated to the north of Sarıyar Dam reservoir and on Turkish state highway D.140. The distance to Nallıhan is 35 kilometres (22 mi) and to Ankara is 126 kilometres (78 mi).

== History ==
The earliest document about the origin of the town is dated in early 1600s. While Nasuh Pasha (later grandvizier) of the Ottoman Empire was travelling from Aleppo (now in Syria) to Istanbul he commissioned three hans (inn, a type of caravanserai). The settlements around these hans were named after the hans; namely Nallıhan, Çayırhan and Uluhan. The town flourished after 1954, when lignite fields were found around the town. On the other hand, during the construction of Sarıyer Dam the settlement was moved 3 kilometres (1.9 mi) to east. In 1976 it was declared a seat of township.

== Economy ==
Cattle production and agriculture were the traditional economic activities of the town. But nowadays lignite mining and the 620 MW Çayırhan power station are the main revenue sources.
