= Nallıhan silk needlelace =

Needle lace in Turkey

Nallıhan silk needlelace (Turkish: Nallıhan ipek iğne oyası) is a needle lace (Turkish: Oya) from Nallıhan in Ankara, Turkey handcrafted using a needle and silk thread.

Silk farming has been done traditionally for centuries in Nallıhan. One room of almost every house in town is reserved for silkworm cocoons. Today, local women produce silk needle lace at home, and sale and export them through a cooperative they founded. A needle lace course is held for younger women of the region in order to include them in the traditional art.

Nallıhan was located northwestern of Ankara in Central Anatolia on the historical trade route Silk Road. For a long time, silkworms as well as rice and Angora goats were raised in the town. By silk farming and operating yarn processing facilities, Nallıhan maintained its importance from the beginning until the middle of the 19th century. In the early 1900s, about 100-150 women were working in the silk yarn plant owned by an Armenian.

The silk needle lace, a folk art based on embrodery, was developed with techniques specific to the town in this period. In Turkey, knitting made using tools such as needles, crochet hooks and hairpins is collected under the name of oya. Among these, needle lace is usually made by knotting silk thread into a loop with a needle. Traditional needle lace is produced in many other places of Turkey despite the differences in style, color, construction technique and tools used.

Changes in commercial value and cutting down of mulberry trees led to the gradual abandonment of silk farming in Nallıhan. Today, raw material for silk needlelace is rarely supplied locally or in households. Despite this, needle lace is part of the culture and economy of the town as a cultural heritage.

Some of the needle laces are named in accordance with their motifs such as "Çapkın Bıyığı" ("Flirtatious Mustache"), "Gönül Kurdu" ("Heartworm"), "Çalı Bakıldağı" ("Bushy Look"), "Elma Çiçeği" ("Apple Blossom"), "Hanım Penceresi" ("Lady's Window"), "Balık Kılçığı" ("Fishbone"), "Küpe Oya" "(Earring Lace"), "Garga Ağzı" ("Crow Beak") etc.

The Nallıhan silk needlelace was registered as a Geographical indication of origin on 15 February 2018.

== Bibliography ==
- Özcan, Fatma (1997). Nallıhan Yöresinde İğne Oyacılığı (in Turkish). Ankara: Kltür Bakanlığı Yayınları. p. 80. ISBN 975-17-1843-0.
- Kolektif (2012). Nallıhan'ın Meşhur İğne Oyaları (in Turkish). İstanbul: Tuva Yayıncılık. p. 88.
- allıhan Yöresi Motifleri Açıklamalı İğne Oyası Rehberi (in Turkish). Tuva Yayıncılık. 2014. p. 96.
- Başaran, Fatma Nur; Özge Kılıç (April 2014). "Nallıhan Cloth Weaving With Needlelace". Journal of New World Sciences Academy. 9 (2): 17–27. doi:10.12739/NWSA.2014.9.2.2C0048.
- Karabasa S.; Ç. Kara (2022). "Heritage of Lace The Inheritance Journey of Nallihan Needle Lace". Folklore/Literaturei. 28 (2): 499–521.
