= Sarıyar (disambiguation) =

Sarıyar is a town in Nallıhan district of Ankara Province, Turkey.

Sarıyar is may also refer to the following places in Turkey:

- Sarıyar, Amasya, a village the central district of in Amasya Province
- Sarıyar, Güce, a village in Güce district of Giresun Province
- Sarıyar, Mudurnu, a village in Mudurnu district of Bolu Province
- Sarıyar Dam, near the town of Sarıyar
- Sarıyar, Şenkaya

== See also ==
- Sarıyer
