= Aydoğmuş =

Aydoğmuş may refer to the following places in Turkey:

- Aydoğmuş, Çay
- Aydoğmuş, Kurucaşile
- Aydoğmuş, Nallıhan
