= Yeşilyurt =

Yeşilyurt (Turkish for "green homeland") may refer to:

== Turkish places ==
=== Neighborhoods ===
- Yeşilyurt, Istanbul, a neighborhood of the district of Bakırköy, Istanbul Province
- Yeşilyurt, İzmir, a neighborhood of the district of Karabağlar, İzmir Province

=== Towns and districts ===
- Yeşilyurt, Gaziantep, a town in the district of İslahiye, Gaziantep Province
- Yeşilyurt, Malatya, a town and district of Malatya Province
- Yeşilyurt, Muğla, a town in Muğla Province
- Yeşilyurt, Tokat, a town and district of Tokat Province

=== Villages ===
- Pentageia, also known as Yeşilyurt, a village in Cyprus
- Yeşilyurt, Alaca
- Yeşilyurt, Ayvacık
- Yeşilyurt, Bartın, a village in the district of Bartın, Bartın Province
- Yeşilyurt, Bayburt, a village in the district of Bayburt, Bayburt Province
- Yeşilyurt, Çay, a village in the district of Çay, Afyonkarahisar Province
- Yeşilyurt, Dinar, a village in the district of Dinar, Afyonkarahisar Province
- Yeşilyurt, Gazipaşa, a village in the district of Gazipaşa, Antalya Province
- Yeşilyurt, Gerger, a village in the district of Gerger, Adıyaman Province
- Yeşilyurt, Gülşehir, a village in the district of Gülşehir, Nevşehir Province
- Yeşilyurt, Haymana, a village in the district of Haymana, Ankara Province
- Yeşilyurt, Horasan
- Yeşilyurt, Karacasu, a village in the district of Karacasu, Aydın Province
- Yeşilyurt, İspir
- Yeşilyurt, Karayazı
- Yeşilyurt, Kemaliye
- Yeşilyurt, Mut, a village in the district of Mut, Mersin Province
- Yeşilyurt, Nallıhan, a village in the district of Nallıhan, Ankara Province
- Yeşilyurt, Sarayköy
- Yeşilyurt, Serik, a village in the district of Serik, Antalya Province
- Yeşilyurt, Söğüt, a village in the district of Söğüt, Bilecik Province
- Yeşilyurt, Şereflikoçhisar, a village in the district of Şereflikoçhisar, Ankara Province
- Yeşilyurt, Taşköprü, a village
- Yeşilyurt, Taşova, a village in the district of Taşova, Amasya Province
- Yeşilyurt, Tut, a village in the district of Tut, Adıyaman Province
- Yeşilyurt, Sungurlu

== Surname ==
- Döndü Yeşilyurt (born 1993), Turkish female para judoka and para weightlifter
- Erdoğan Yeşilyurt (born 1993), Turkish-German footballer

== Other uses ==
- SV Yeşilyurt, a German football club
- Yeşilyurt Women's Volleyball Team, a Turkish women's volleyball team, from the Yeşilyurt neighborhood of Istanbul
