= Tekke, Nallıhan =

Tekke
- Neighbourhood
- Location in Turkey Tekke (Turkey Central Anatolia)
- Coordinates: 40.1430°N 31.2074°E
- Country: Turkey
- Province: Ankara
- District: Nallıhan
- Population (2022): 55
- Time zone: UTC+3 (TRT)

Tekke is a neighbourhood in the municipality and district of Nallıhan, Ankara Province, Turkey. Its population is 55 (2022).

The mausoleum of Bacim Sultan, a daughter of Taptuk Emre, is located in Tekke.
