= Davutoğlan, Nallıhan =

Davutoğlan
- Neighbourhood
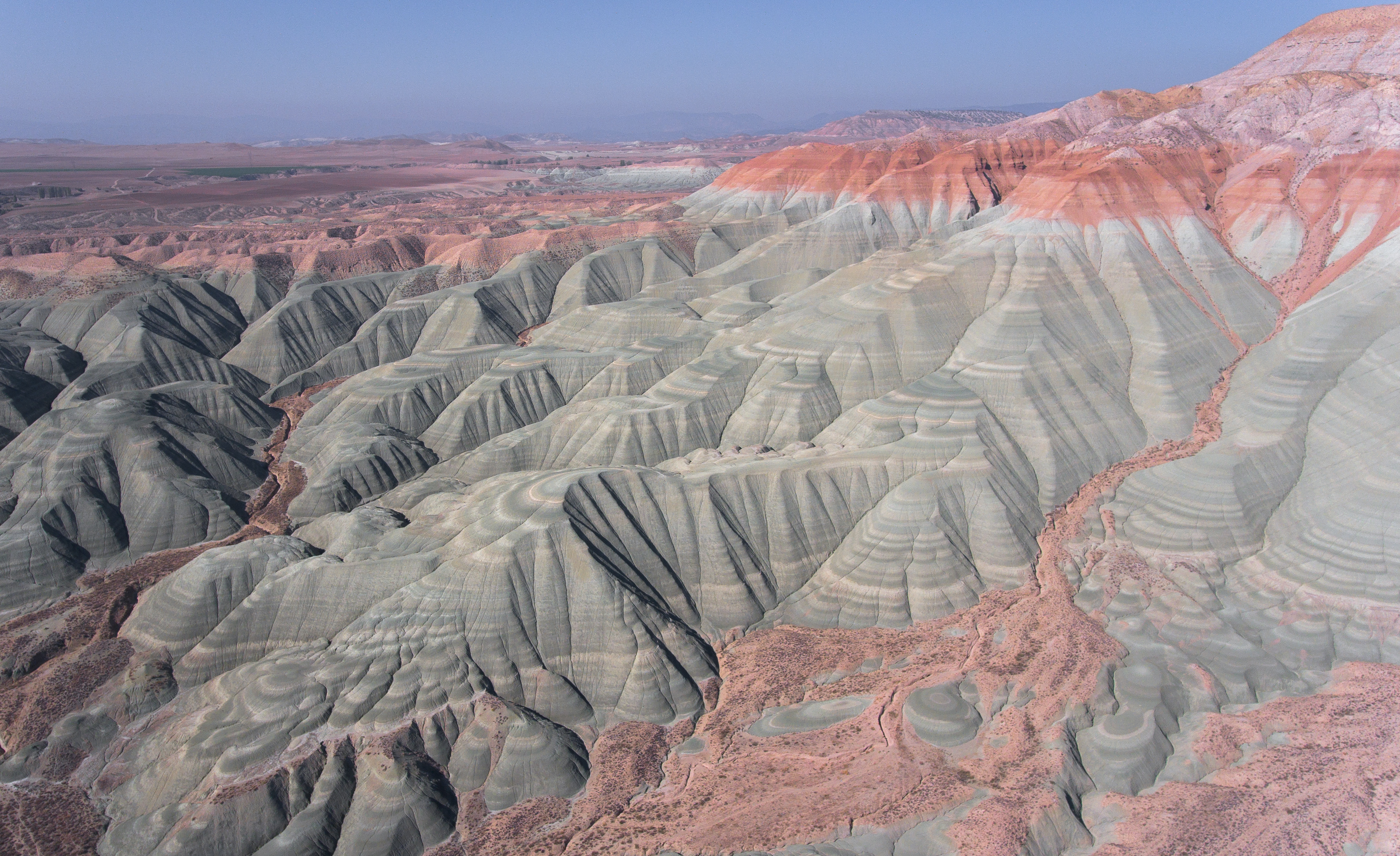
- Aerial view of the Colorful Mountains of Nallıhan

- Location within Turkey Location within Turkey Central Anatolia
- Coordinates: 40°07′N 31°38′E
- Country: Turkey
- Province: Ankara
- District: Nallıhan
- Population (2022): 166
- Time zone: UTC+3 (TRT)

Davutoğlan is a neighbourhood in the municipality and district of Nallıhan, Ankara Province, Turkey. Its population is 166 (2022).
