= Tekirler, Nallıhan =

Tekirler
- Neighbourhood
- Location within Turkey Location within Turkey Central Anatolia
- Country: Turkey
- Province: Ankara
- District: Nallıhan
- Population (2022): 138
- Time zone: UTC+3 (TRT)

Tekirler, Ankara

Tekirler is a neighbourhood in the municipality and district of Nallıhan, Ankara Province, Turkey. Its population in 2022 was 138.

== History ==
The village is called Tekfurlar in records from 1521. Previously part of the town of Mihalgazi in Söğüt District, Bilecik Province, it was attached to Nallıhan district of Ankara on 22 October 1929.

== Geography ==
It is 221 kilometers from Ankara and 60 kilometers from Nallıhan district center.

== Population ==
Historical population
Year	Pop.	±% p.a.
1997	324	—
2007	229	−3.41%
2012	176	−5.13%
2017	150	−3.15%
2022	138	−1.65%
Source: 1997 census and TÜIK (2007-2022)
