= Çalıcaalan, Nallıhan =

Çalıcaalan
- Neighbourhood
- Location in Turkey Çalıcaalan (Turkey Central Anatolia)
- Coordinates: 40°18′N 31°11′E
- Country: Turkey
- Province: Ankara
- District: Nallıhan
- Population (2022): 98
- Time zone: UTC+3 (TRT)

Çalıcaalan is a neighbourhood in the municipality and district of Nallıhan, Ankara Province, Turkey. Its population is 98 (2022).
