= Döğmeci, Nallıhan =

Döğmeci
- Neighbourhood
- Location in Turkey Döğmeci (Turkey Central Anatolia)
- Coordinates: 40°15′N 31°09′E
- Country: Turkey
- Province: Ankara
- District: Nallıhan
- Population (2022): 21
- Time zone: UTC+3 (TRT)

Döğmeci is a neighbourhood in the municipality and district of Nallıhan, Ankara Province, Turkey. Its population is 21 (2022).
