= Karacasu (disambiguation) =

Karacasu is a town and district of Aydın Province, Turkey.

Karacasu may also refer to:

- Karacasu, Bolu, a town in the central district of Bolu Province, Turkey
- Karacasu, Nallıhan, a neighbourhood in Ankara Province, Turkey
- Karacasu Dam, a dam in Aydın Province, Turkey
