= Beydili, Nallıhan =

Beydili
- Neighbourhood
- Location in Turkey Beydili (Turkey Central Anatolia)
- Coordinates: 40.1583°N 31.0046°E
- Country: Turkey
- Province: Ankara
- District: Nallıhan
- Population (2022): 191
- Time zone: UTC+3 (TRT)

Beydili is a neighbourhood in the municipality and district of Nallıhan, Ankara Province, Turkey. Its population is 191 (2022).
