= Kulu, Nallıhan =

Kulu
- Neighbourhood
- Location in Turkey Kulu (Turkey Central Anatolia)
- Coordinates: 40.1126°N 31.1740°E
- Country: Turkey
- Province: Ankara
- District: Nallıhan
- Population (2022): 18
- Time zone: UTC+3 (TRT)

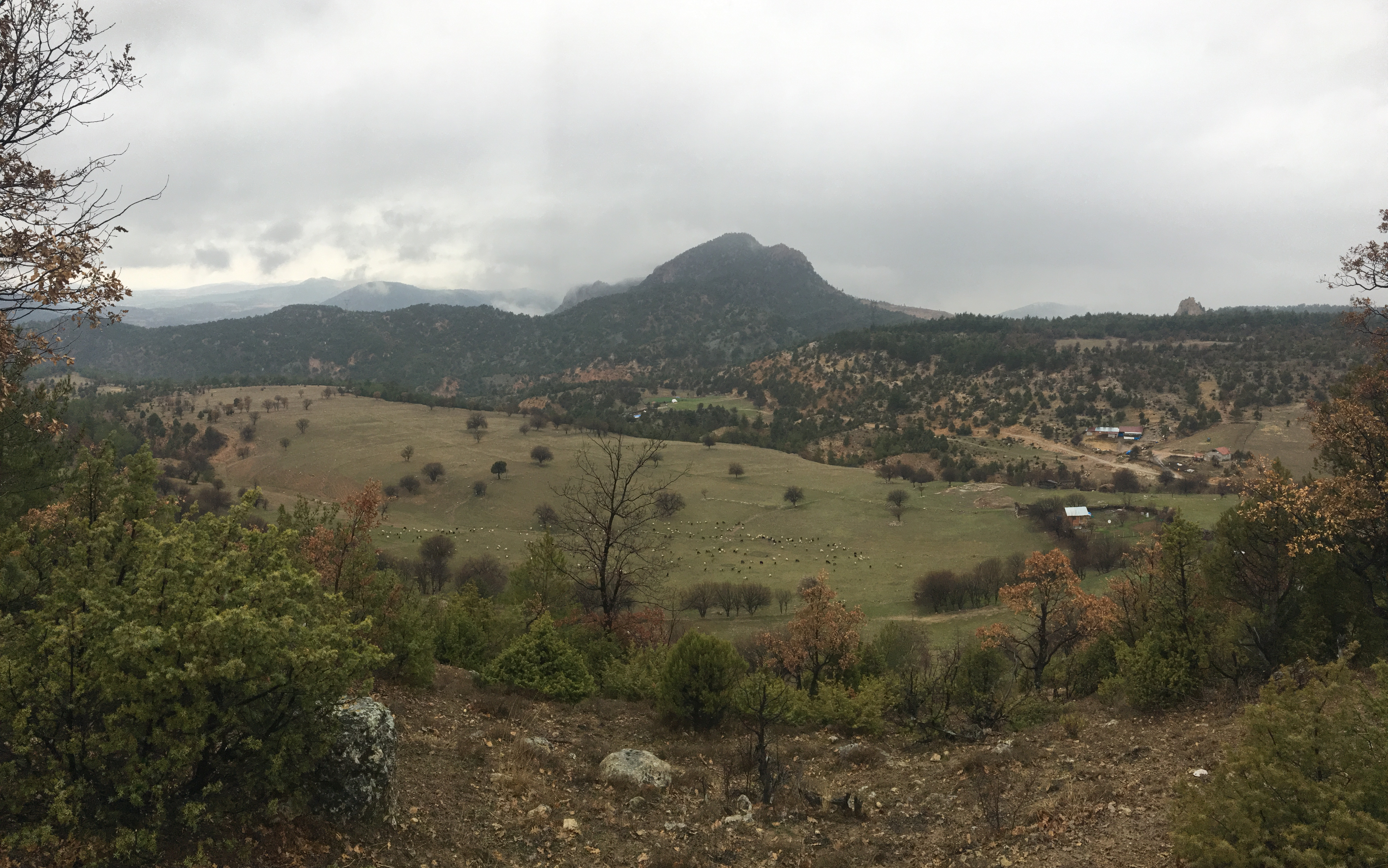
Kulu, Nallıhan

Kulu is a neighbourhood in the municipality and district of Nallıhan, Ankara Province, Turkey. Its population is 18 (2022).
