= İslamalan, Nallıhan =

İslamalan
- Neighbourhood
- Location in Turkey İslamalan (Turkey Central Anatolia)
- Coordinates: 40°14′N 31°08′E
- Country: Turkey
- Province: Ankara
- District: Nallıhan
- Population (2022): 64
- Time zone: UTC+3 (TRT)

İslamalan is a neighbourhood in the municipality and district of Nallıhan, Ankara Province, Turkey. Its population is 64 (2022).
