= Demirköy, Nallıhan =

Demirköy
- Neighbourhood
- Location in Turkey Demirköy (Turkey Central Anatolia)
- Coordinates: 40.1625°N 31.0822°E
- Country: Turkey
- Province: Ankara
- District: Nallıhan
- Population (2022): 58
- Time zone: UTC+3 (TRT)

Demirköy is a neighbourhood in the municipality and district of Nallıhan, Ankara Province, Turkey. Its population is 58 (2022).
