= Dereköy, Nallıhan =

Dereköy
- Neighbourhood
- Location in Turkey Dereköy (Turkey Central Anatolia)
- Coordinates: 40.2740°N 31.3362°E
- Country: Turkey
- Province: Ankara
- District: Nallıhan
- Population (2022): 87
- Time zone: UTC+3 (TRT)

Dereköy is a neighbourhood in the municipality and district of Nallıhan, Ankara Province, Turkey. Its population is 87 (2022).
