= Meyilhacılar, Nallıhan =

Meyilhacılar
- Neighbourhood
- Location in Turkey Meyilhacılar (Turkey Central Anatolia)
- Coordinates: 40°11′N 31°10′E
- Country: Turkey
- Province: Ankara
- District: Nallıhan
- Population (2022): 57
- Time zone: UTC+3 (TRT)

Meyilhacılar is a neighbourhood in the municipality and district of Nallıhan, Ankara Province, Turkey. Its population is 57 (2022).
