= Osmanköy, Nallıhan =

Osmanköy
- Neighbourhood
- Location in Turkey Osmanköy (Turkey Central Anatolia)
- Coordinates: 40.0703°N 30.9769°E
- Country: Turkey
- Province: Ankara
- District: Nallıhan
- Population (2022): 238
- Time zone: UTC+3 (TRT)

Osmanköy is a neighbourhood in the municipality and district of Nallıhan, Ankara Province, Turkey. Its population is 238 (2022).
