= Gökçeöz, Nallıhan =

Gökçeöz
- Neighbourhood
- Location in Turkey Gökçeöz (Turkey Central Anatolia)
- Coordinates: 40.2549°N 31.6679°E
- Country: Turkey
- Province: Ankara
- District: Nallıhan
- Population (2022): 122
- Time zone: UTC+3 (TRT)

Gökçeöz is a neighbourhood in the municipality and district of Nallıhan, Ankara Province, Turkey. Its population is 122 (2022).
