= Tepe, Nallıhan =

Tepe
- Neighbourhood
- Location in Turkey Tepe (Turkey Central Anatolia)
- Coordinates: 40.0884°N 31.1718°E
- Country: Turkey
- Province: Ankara
- District: Nallıhan
- Population (2022): 51
- Time zone: UTC+3 (TRT)

Tepe is a neighbourhood in the municipality and district of Nallıhan, Ankara Province, Turkey. Its population is 51 (2022).
