= Yukarıbağlıca, Nallıhan =

Yukarıbağlıca
- Neighbourhood
- Location in Turkey Yukarıbağlıca (Turkey Central Anatolia)
- Coordinates: 40.1888°N 31.3073°E
- Country: Turkey
- Province: Ankara
- District: Nallıhan
- Population (2022): 107
- Time zone: UTC+3 (TRT)

Yukarıbağlıca is a neighbourhood in the municipality and district of Nallıhan, Ankara Province, Turkey. Its population is 107 (2022).
