= Aşağıbağlıca, Nallıhan =

Aşağıbağlıca
- Neighbourhood
- Location in Turkey Aşağıbağlıca (Turkey Central Anatolia)
- Coordinates: 40°11′N 31°17′E
- Country: Turkey
- Province: Ankara
- District: Nallıhan
- Population (2022): 56
- Time zone: UTC+3 (TRT)

Aşağıbağlıca is a neighbourhood in the municipality and district of Nallıhan, Ankara Province, Turkey. Its population is 56 (2022).
