= Belenalan, Nallıhan =

Belenalan
- Neighbourhood
- Location in Turkey Belenalan (Turkey Central Anatolia)
- Coordinates: 40.1191°N 31.0443°E
- Country: Turkey
- Province: Ankara
- District: Nallıhan
- Population (2022): 78
- Time zone: UTC+3 (TRT)

Belenalan is a neighbourhood in the municipality and district of Nallıhan, Ankara Province, Turkey. Its population is 78 (2022).
