= Kuruca, Nallıhan =

Kuruca
- Neighbourhood
- Location in Turkey Kuruca (Turkey Central Anatolia)
- Coordinates: 40.0835°N 31.0690°E
- Country: Turkey
- Province: Ankara
- District: Nallıhan
- Population (2022): 106
- Time zone: UTC+3 (TRT)

Kuruca is a neighbourhood in the municipality and district of Nallıhan, Ankara Province, Turkey. Its population is 106 (2022).
