= Çayıryazı =

Çayıryazı can refer to:

- Çayıryazı, Çay
- Çayıryazı, Üzümlü
