= Orhaniye =

Orhaniye (literally "land of Orhan" in Turkish) may refer to the following places in Turkey:

- Orhaniye, Bandırma, a village
- Orhaniye, Edirne
- Orhaniye, Karacabey
- Orhaniye, Kazan, a village and neighborhood in the district of Kazan, Ankara Province
- Orhaniye, Keşan
- Orhaniye, Kestel
- Orhaniye, Koçarlı, a village in the district of Koçarlı, Aydın Province
- Orhaniye, Mudanya
- Orhaniye, Mustafakemalpaşa
- Orhaniye, Osmaneli, a village in the district of Osmaneli, Bilecik Province
- Orhaniye, Çay, a village in the district of Çay, Afyonkarahisar Province
