= İnli =

İnli may refer to:

- İnli, Çay, a village in the Çay district of Afyonkarahisar Province, Turkey
- İnli, Kütahya, a village in the Merkez (Central) district of Kütahya Province, Turkey
