= Çive, Nallıhan =

Çive
- Neighbourhood
- Location in Turkey Çive (Turkey Central Anatolia)
- Coordinates: 40°12′N 31°05′E
- Country: Turkey
- Province: Ankara
- District: Nallıhan
- Population (2022): 85
- Time zone: UTC+3 (TRT)

Çive is a neighbourhood in the municipality and district of Nallıhan, Ankara Province, Turkey. Its population is 85 (2022).
