= Beyalan, Nallıhan =

Beyalan
- Neighbourhood
- Location in Turkey Beyalan (Turkey Central Anatolia)
- Coordinates: 40.2699°N 31.5155°E
- Country: Turkey
- Province: Ankara
- District: Nallıhan
- Population (2022): 42
- Time zone: UTC+3 (TRT)

Beyalan is a neighbourhood in the municipality and district of Nallıhan, Ankara Province, Turkey. Its population is 42 (2022).
