= Araunia =

Town in ancient Galatia

Coordinates: 40°02′01″N 31°46′57″E

Araunia was a town of ancient Galatia inhabited during Byzantine times. It was located on the main road between Nicaea and Ancyra near where it crosses the Sangarius River.

Its site is located southeast of Sykeon in Asiatic Turkey.
