= Pınarkaya =

Pınarkaya can refer to:

- Pınarkaya, Çay
- Pınarkaya, Ergani
