= Güzelöz, Nallıhan =

Güzelöz
- Neighbourhood
- Location in Turkey Güzelöz (Turkey Central Anatolia)
- Coordinates: 40.2956°N 31.3610°E
- Country: Turkey
- Province: Ankara
- District: Nallıhan
- Population (2022): 80
- Time zone: UTC+3 (TRT)

Güzelöz is a neighbourhood in the municipality and district of Nallıhan, Ankara Province, Turkey. Its population is 80 (2022).
