= Aşağıbağdere, Nallıhan =

Aşağıbağdere
- Neighbourhood
- Location in Turkey Aşağıbağdere (Turkey Central Anatolia)
- Coordinates: 40°06′N 31°06′E
- Country: Turkey
- Province: Ankara
- District: Nallıhan
- Population (2022): 21
- Time zone: UTC+3 (TRT)

Aşağıbağdere is a neighbourhood in the municipality and district of Nallıhan, Ankara Province, Turkey. Its population is 21 (2022). Its economy is based on agriculture and livestock. Aşağıbağdere is 191 km from the city of Ankara.
