= Karahisarkozlu, Nallıhan =

Karahisarkozlu
- Neighbourhood
- Location in Turkey Karahisarkozlu (Turkey Central Anatolia)
- Coordinates: 40°05′N 31°16′E
- Country: Turkey
- Province: Ankara
- District: Nallıhan
- Population (2022): 90
- Time zone: UTC+3 (TRT)

Karahisarkozlu is a neighbourhood in the municipality and district of Nallıhan, Ankara Province, Turkey. Its population is 90 (2022).
