= Kadıköy, Nallıhan =

Kadıköy
- Neighbourhood
- Location in Turkey Kadıköy (Turkey Central Anatolia)
- Coordinates: 40.2455°N 31.2400°E
- Country: Turkey
- Province: Ankara
- District: Nallıhan
- Population (2022): 35
- Time zone: UTC+3 (TRT)

Kadıköy is a neighbourhood in the municipality and district of Nallıhan, Ankara Province, Turkey. Its population is 35 (2022).
