= Akdere, Nallıhan =

Akdere
- Neighbourhood
- Location in Turkey Akdere (Turkey Central Anatolia)
- Coordinates: 40.1971°N 31.3402°E
- Country: Turkey
- Province: Ankara
- District: Nallıhan
- Population (2022): 182
- Time zone: UTC+3 (TRT)

Akdere is a neighbourhood in the municipality and district of Nallıhan, Ankara Province, Turkey. Its population is 182 (2022).
