= Aksu, Nallıhan =

Aksu
- Neighbourhood
- Location in Turkey Aksu (Turkey Central Anatolia)
- Coordinates: 40.2211°N 31.2109°E
- Country: Turkey
- Province: Ankara
- District: Nallıhan
- Population (2022): 33
- Time zone: UTC+3 (TRT)

Aksu is a neighbourhood in the municipality and district of Nallıhan, Ankara Province, Turkey. Its population is 33 (2022).

According to the Ottoman State Archives; Aksu was first acknowledged to exist in 1487. Though it likely existed before this date. Aksu is recorded as the first and only name of the settlement.
