= Emremsultan, Nallıhan =

Emremsultan
- Neighbourhood
- Location in Turkey Emremsultan (Turkey Central Anatolia)
- Coordinates: 40°04′N 31°24′E
- Country: Turkey
- Province: Ankara
- District: Nallıhan
- Population (2022): 124
- Time zone: UTC+3 (TRT)

Emremsultan is a neighbourhood in the municipality and district of Nallıhan, Ankara Province, Turkey. Its population is 124 (2022).
