= Aliefe, Nallıhan =

Aliefe
- Neighbourhood
- Location in Turkey Aliefe (Turkey Central Anatolia)
- Coordinates: 40°12′N 31°11′E
- Country: Turkey
- Province: Ankara
- District: Nallıhan
- Population (2022): 38
- Time zone: UTC+3 (TRT)

Aliefe is a neighbourhood in the municipality and district of Nallıhan, Ankara Province, Turkey. Its population is 38 (2022).
