= Eğri, Nallıhan =

Eğri
- Neighbourhood
- Country: Turkey
- Province: Ankara
- District: Nallıhan

Government
  - Muhtar: Erdoğan Aydoğdu
- Population (2022): 67
- Time zone: UTC+3 (TRT)

Eğri is a neighbourhood in the municipality and district of Nallıhan, Ankara Province, Turkey. Its population is 67 (2022).

== Geography ==
Eğri is 204 km from Ankara city and 43 km from Nallıhan town.
