= Sarıkaya, Nallıhan =

Sarıkaya
- Neighbourhood
- Location in Turkey Sarıkaya (Turkey Central Anatolia)
- Coordinates: 40.2524°N 31.4319°E
- Country: Turkey
- Province: Ankara
- District: Nallıhan
- Population (2022): 81
- Time zone: UTC+3 (TRT)

Sarıkaya is a neighbourhood in the municipality and district of Nallıhan, Ankara Province, Turkey. Its population is 81 (2022).
