= Alanköy, Nallıhan =

Alanköy
- Neighbourhood
- Location in Turkey Alanköy (Turkey Central Anatolia)
- Coordinates: 40.1107°N 31.2147°E
- Country: Turkey
- Province: Ankara
- District: Nallıhan
- Population (2022): 85
- Time zone: UTC+3 (TRT)

Alanköy (also: Alan) is a neighbourhood in the municipality and district of Nallıhan, Ankara Province, Turkey. Its population is 85 (2022).
