= Çiller, Nallıhan =

Çiller
- Neighbourhood
- Location in Turkey Çiller (Turkey Central Anatolia)
- Coordinates: 40.3212°N 31.2697°E
- Country: Turkey
- Province: Ankara
- District: Nallıhan
- Population (2022): 79
- Time zone: UTC+3 (TRT)

Çiller is a neighbourhood in the municipality and district of Nallıhan, Ankara Province, Turkey. Its population is 79 (2022).
