= Atça, Nallıhan =

Atça
- Neighbourhood
- Location in Turkey Atça (Turkey Central Anatolia)
- Coordinates: 40.1961°N 31.5419°E
- Country: Turkey
- Province: Ankara
- District: Nallıhan
- Population (2022): 143
- Time zone: UTC+3 (TRT)

Atça is a neighbourhood in the municipality and district of Nallıhan, Ankara Province, Turkey. Its population is 143 (2022).
