= Aşağıkavacık, Nallıhan =

Aşağıkavacık
- Neighbourhood
- Location in Turkey Aşağıkavacık (Turkey Central Anatolia)
- Coordinates: 40.1747°N 31.2220°E
- Country: Turkey
- Province: Ankara
- District: Nallıhan
- Population (2022): 110
- Time zone: UTC+3 (TRT)

Aşağıkavacık is a neighbourhood in the municipality and district of Nallıhan, Ankara Province, Turkey. Its population is 110 (2022).
