= Subaşı, Nallıhan =

Subaşı
- Neighbourhood
- Location in Turkey Subaşı (Turkey Central Anatolia)
- Coordinates: 40.1892°N 31.0928°E
- Country: Turkey
- Province: Ankara
- District: Nallıhan
- Population (2022): 42
- Time zone: UTC+3 (TRT)

Subaşı is a neighbourhood in the municipality and district of Nallıhan, Ankara Province, Turkey. Its population is 42 (2022).
