= Arkutça, Nallıhan =

Arkutça
- Neighbourhood
- Location in Turkey Arkutça (Turkey Central Anatolia)
- Coordinates: 40°14′N 31°16′E
- Country: Turkey
- Province: Ankara
- District: Nallıhan
- Population (2022): 41
- Time zone: UTC+3 (TRT)

Arkutça is a neighbourhood in the municipality and district of Nallıhan, Ankara Province, Turkey. Its population is 41 (2022).
