= Nallıgölcük, Nallıhan =

Nallıgölcük
- Neighbourhood
- Location in Turkey Nallıgölcük (Turkey Central Anatolia)
- Coordinates: 40°16′N 31°33′E
- Country: Turkey
- Province: Ankara
- District: Nallıhan
- Population (2022): 38
- Time zone: UTC+3 (TRT)

Nallıgölcük is a neighbourhood in the municipality and district of Nallıhan, Ankara Province, Turkey. Its population is 38 (2022).
