= Kabaca, Nallıhan =

Kabaca
- Neighbourhood
- Location in Turkey Kabaca (Turkey Central Anatolia)
- Coordinates: 40.3130°N 31.3629°E
- Country: Turkey
- Province: Ankara
- District: Nallıhan
- Population (2022): 170
- Time zone: UTC+3 (TRT)

Kabaca is a neighbourhood in the municipality and district of Nallıhan, Ankara Province, Turkey. Its population is 170 (2022).
