= Sarıyar =

- Neighbourhood
- Location in Turkey Sarıyar (Turkey Central Anatolia)
- Coordinates: 40°02′N 31°26′E
- Country: Turkey
- Province: Ankara
- District: Nallıhan
- Elevation: 415 m (1,362 ft)
- Population (2022): 501
- Time zone: UTC+3 (TRT)
- Postal code: 06925
- Area code: 0312

Sarıyar is a neighbourhood in the municipality and district of Nallıhan, Ankara Province, Turkey. Its population is 501 (2022). Before the 2013 reorganisation, it was a town (belde).

It is situated to the west of Sarıyar Dam reservoir and along the Sakarya River. The distance to Nallıhan is 42 kilometres (26 mi) and to Ankara is 160 kilometres (99 mi). According to mayor's page, the name of the town ("yellow cliff") refers to the landscape around Sarıyar. During the dam construction years in 1950s, the population of the town increased because of services to construction. In 1983, Sarıyar was declared a seat of township. Nevertheless the population has dropped since then. At the present the main economic activity is agriculture and the main crops are vegetables and grapes. With picnic areas around the dam and the tomb of Taptuk Emre, a 13th-century dervish in the nearby village of Emremsultan, tourism also plays some role in the town economy.
