= Belenören, Nallıhan =

Belenören
- Neighbourhood
- Location in Turkey Belenören (Turkey Central Anatolia)
- Coordinates: 40.2858°N 31.4748°E
- Country: Turkey
- Province: Ankara
- District: Nallıhan
- Population (2022): 57
- Time zone: UTC+3 (TRT)

Belenören is a neighbourhood in the municipality and district of Nallıhan, Ankara Province, Turkey. Its population is 57 (2022).
