= Karahisargölcük, Nallıhan =

Karahisargölcük
- Neighbourhood
- Location in Turkey Karahisargölcük (Turkey Central Anatolia)
- Coordinates: 40°07′N 31°07′E
- Country: Turkey
- Province: Ankara
- District: Nallıhan
- Population (2022): 38
- Time zone: UTC+3 (TRT)

Karahisargölcük is a neighborhood in the municipality and district of Nallıhan, Ankara Province, Turkey. As of 2022, its population is 38.
