= Eymir, Nallıhan =

Eymir
- Neighbourhood
- Location in Turkey Eymir (Turkey Central Anatolia)
- Coordinates: 40.1757°N 31.4679°E
- Country: Turkey
- Province: Ankara
- District: Nallıhan
- Population (2022): 338
- Time zone: UTC+3 (TRT)

Eymir is a neighbourhood in the municipality and district of Nallıhan, Ankara Province, Turkey. Its population is 338 (2022).
