= Karahisar, Nallıhan =

Karahisar
- Neighbourhood
- Location in Turkey Karahisar (Turkey Central Anatolia)
- Coordinates: 40°11′N 31°07′E
- Country: Turkey
- Province: Ankara
- District: Nallıhan
- Population (2022): 64
- Time zone: UTC+3 (TRT)

Karahisar is a neighbourhood in the municipality and district of Nallıhan, Ankara Province, Turkey. Its population is 64 (2022).
