= Hacıhasanlar, Nallıhan =

Hacıhasanlar
- Neighbourhood
- Location in Turkey Hacıhasanlar (Turkey Central Anatolia)
- Coordinates: 40°18′N 31°07′E
- Country: Turkey
- Province: Ankara
- District: Nallıhan
- Population (2022): 23
- Time zone: UTC+3 (TRT)

Hacıhasanlar is a neighbourhood in the municipality and district of Nallıhan, Ankara Province, Turkey. Its population is 23 (2022).
