= Kavakköy, Nallıhan =

Kavakköy
- Neighbourhood
- Country: Turkey
- Province: Ankara
- District: Nallıhan
- Population (2022): 136
- Time zone: UTC+3 (TRT)

Kavakköy is a neighbourhood in the municipality and district of Nallıhan, Ankara Province, Turkey. Its population is 136 (2022).
