= Meyildere, Nallıhan =

Meyildere
- Neighbourhood
- Location in Turkey Meyildere (Turkey Central Anatolia)
- Coordinates: 40°10′N 31°10′E
- Country: Turkey
- Province: Ankara
- District: Nallıhan
- Population (2022): 61
- Time zone: UTC+3 (TRT)

Meyildere is a neighbourhood in the municipality and district of Nallıhan, Ankara Province, Turkey. Its population is 61 (2022).
