= Doğandere, Nallıhan =

Doğandere
- Neighbourhood
- Location in Turkey Doğandere (Turkey Central Anatolia)
- Coordinates: 40.3020°N 31.2864°E
- Country: Turkey
- Province: Ankara
- District: Nallıhan
- Population (2022): 118
- Time zone: UTC+3 (TRT)

Doğandere is a neighbourhood in the municipality and district of Nallıhan, Ankara Province, Turkey. Its population is 118 (2022).
