= Bozyaka, Nallıhan =

Bozyaka
- Neighbourhood
- Location in Turkey Bozyaka (Turkey Central Anatolia)
- Coordinates: 40.2581°N 31.3544°E
- Country: Turkey
- Province: Ankara
- District: Nallıhan
- Population (2022): 275
- Time zone: UTC+3 (TRT)

Bozyaka is a neighbourhood in the municipality and district of Nallıhan, Ankara Province, Turkey. Its population is 275 (2022).
