= Öşürler, Nallıhan =

Öşürler
- Neighbourhood
- Location in Turkey Öşürler (Turkey Central Anatolia)
- Coordinates: 40°06′N 31°05′E
- Country: Turkey
- Province: Ankara
- District: Nallıhan
- Population (2022): 32
- Time zone: UTC+3 (TRT)

Öşürler is a neighbourhood in the municipality and district of Nallıhan, Ankara Province, Turkey. Its population is 32 (2022).
