= Kuzucular, Nallıhan =

Kuzucular
- Neighbourhood
- Location in Turkey Kuzucular (Turkey Central Anatolia)
- Coordinates: 40°06′N 30°54′E
- Country: Turkey
- Province: Ankara
- District: Nallıhan
- Population (2022): 148
- Time zone: UTC+3 (TRT)

Kuzucular is a neighbourhood in the municipality and district of Nallıhan, Ankara Province, Turkey. Its population is 148 (2022).
