= Beycik =

Beycik may refer to the following places in Turkey:

- Beycik, Kemer, a village in the district of Kemer, Antalya Province
- Beycik, Nallıhan, a village in the district of Nallıhan, Ankara Province
