= Lake Karamık =

Lake in Turkey

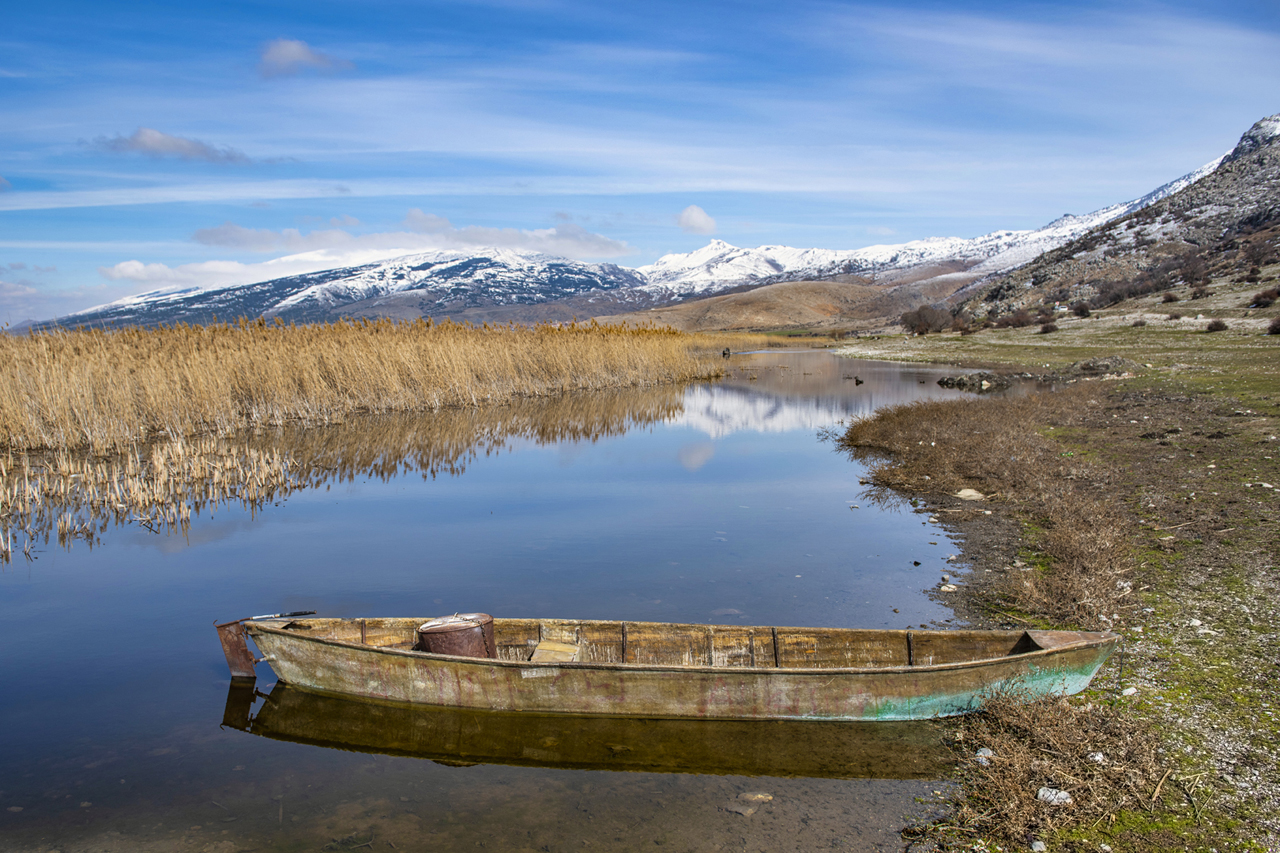
- Karamık Reeds

- Location of Lake Karamık in Turkey.
- Location: Çay, Afyonkarahisar Province
- Coordinates: 38°25′N 30°50′E
- Basin countries: Turkey
- Surface elevation: 1,000 metres (3,300 ft)

Lake Karamık is a lake in Turkey.

It is situated to the south of Çay ilçe (district) of Afyonkarahisar Province at 38°25′N 30°50′E. It is a very shallow lake and in some sources it is called a "marsh". Its elevation with respect to sea level is about 1,000 metres (3,300 ft). It feeds Lake Eğirdir a bigger lake to the south by means of an underground creek. The total area of the marsh area is about 40 square kilometres (15 sq mi).

== Fauna ==
The fishes of the lake are common carp and northern pike as well as Turkish crayfish. The birds of the lake are Eurasian bittern, Eurasian coot, Eurasian spoonbill, Ferruginous duck, greater sand plover, gull-billed tern, purple heron, pygmy cormorant, squacco heron and white-headed duck
