= Ericek, Nallıhan =

Ericek
- Neighbourhood
- Location in Turkey Ericek (Turkey Central Anatolia)
- Coordinates: 40.1929°N 30.9678°E
- Country: Turkey
- Province: Ankara
- District: Nallıhan
- Population (2022): 96 i
- Time zone: UTC+3 (TRT)

Ericek is a neighbourhood in the municipality and district of Nallıhan, Ankara Province, Turkey. Its population is 96 (2022).
