= Hıdırlar, Nallıhan =

Hıdırlar
- Neighbourhood
- Location in Turkey Hıdırlar (Turkey Central Anatolia)
- Coordinates: 40.0780°N 31.4220°E
- Country: Turkey
- Province: Ankara
- District: Nallıhan
- Population (2022): 202
- Time zone: UTC+3 (TRT)

Hıdırlar is a neighbourhood in the municipality and district of Nallıhan, Ankara Province, Turkey. Its population is 202 (2022).
