= Soğukkuyu, Nallıhan =

Soğukkuyu
- Neighbourhood
- Location in Turkey Soğukkuyu (Turkey Central Anatolia)
- Coordinates: 40.0893°N 31.0300°E
- Country: Turkey
- Province: Ankara
- District: Nallıhan
- Population (2022): 150
- Time zone: UTC+3 (TRT)

Soğukkuyu is a neighbourhood in the municipality and district of Nallıhan, Ankara Province, Turkey. Its population is 150 (2022).
