= Uluköy, Nallıhan =

Uluköy
- Neighbourhood
- Location in Turkey Uluköy (Turkey Central Anatolia)
- Coordinates: 40.1586°N 31.6610°E
- Country: Turkey
- Province: Ankara
- District: Nallıhan
- Population (2022): 139
- Time zone: UTC+3 (TRT)

Uluköy is a neighbourhood in the municipality and district of Nallıhan, Ankara Province, Turkey. Its population is 139 (2022).
