= Karaköy, Nallıhan =

Karaköy
- Neighbourhood
- Location in Turkey Karaköy (Turkey Central Anatolia)
- Coordinates: 40.1836°N 31.6533°E
- Country: Turkey
- Province: Ankara
- District: Nallıhan
- Population (2022): 210
- Time zone: UTC+3 (TRT)

Karaköy is a neighbourhood in the municipality and district of Nallıhan, Ankara Province, Turkey. Its population is 210 (2022).
