= Epçeler, Nallıhan =

Epçeler
- Neighbourhood
- Location in Turkey Epçeler (Turkey Central Anatolia)
- Coordinates: 40.2369°N 31.0947°E
- Country: Turkey
- Province: Ankara
- District: Nallıhan
- Population (2022): 54
- Time zone: UTC+3 (TRT)

Epçeler is a neighbourhood in the municipality and district of Nallıhan, Ankara Province, Turkey. Its population is 54 (2022).
