= Ömerşeyhler, Nallıhan =

Ömerşeyhler
- Neighbourhood
- Location in Turkey Ömerşeyhler (Turkey Central Anatolia)
- Coordinates: 40°06′45″N 31°18′37″E
- Country: Turkey
- Province: Ankara
- District: Nallıhan
- Population (2022): 74
- Time zone: UTC+3 (TRT)

Ömerşeyhler is a neighbourhood in the municipality and district of Nallıhan, Ankara Province, Turkey. Its population is 74 (2022).
