= Çamalan, Nallıhan =

Çamalan
- Neighbourhood
- Location in Turkey Çamalan (Turkey Central Anatolia)
- Coordinates: 40.1292°N 30.9369°E
- Country: Turkey
- Province: Ankara
- District: Nallıhan
- Population (2022): 343
- Time zone: UTC+3 (TRT)

Çamalan is a neighbourhood in the municipality and district of Nallıhan, Ankara Province, Turkey. Its population is 343 (2022).
