= Mount Sarıçalı National Park =

National park in Turkey

- Sarıçaşı Dağı Milli Parkı
- Location within Turkey
- Location: Ankara Province, Turkey
- Nearest city: Nallıhan
- Coordinates: 40.26692°N 31.25610°E
- Area: 1,024 ha (2,530 acres)
- Elevation: 1,740 m (5,710 ft)
- Established: 27 October 2021; 4 years ago
- Governing body: Directorate-General of Nature Protection and National Parks; Mimistry of Agriculture and Forestry

Mount Sarıçalı National Park (Turkish: Sarıçalı Dağı Milli Parkı), established on 27 October 2021, is the 46th national park in Turkey. It is located in Nallıhan district within Ankara Province, Central Anatolia.

== Overview ==
Mount Sarıçalı (Turkish: Sarıçalı Dağı) is located next to Çulhalar village in the northeast, 25 km (16 mi) northwest of Nallıhan town and 185 km (115 mi) northwest of Ankara. The 1,740 m (5,710 ft)-high mountain takes its name from the shrub barberry (Turkish: Sarıçalı).

== National park ==
The area around the mountain was declared as the 46th national park in Turkey on 27 October 2021. The national park is administrated by the Directoriate-General of Nature Protection and National Parks at the Ministry of Agriculture and Forestry.

Stretching over an area of 1,024 ha (2,530 acres), the Mount Sarıçalı National Park has a natural texture appearance. The Uyuzsuyu Waterfall with a vertical drop of 50–60 m (160–200 ft) is situated within the park area.

=== Flora ===
The national park is located at the intersection of three phytogeographies (plant geography) in Turkey, and hosts 936 plant species, including 139 endemic plants. The park is home to around 600 monumental larch, Kasnak oak and juniper trees, which are 700–800 years old.

=== Fauna ===
It is rich in wild animals such as bear, wild boar, wolf, fox, rabbit, red deer, and is home to many bird species.

=== Activities ===
The national park is preferred for nature walks and nature photography activities.
