= Nallıdere, Nallıhan =

Nallıdere
- Neighbourhood
- Location in Turkey Nallıdere (Turkey Central Anatolia)
- Coordinates: 40°08′N 31°21′E
- Country: Turkey
- Province: Ankara
- District: Nallıhan
- Population (2022): 65
- Time zone: UTC+3 (TRT)

Nallıdere is a neighbourhood in the municipality and district of Nallıhan, Ankara Province, Turkey. Its population is 65 (2022).
