= Yukarıkavacık, Nallıhan =

Yukarıkavacık
- Neighbourhood
- Location in Turkey Yukarıkavacık (Turkey Central Anatolia)
- Coordinates: 40.1905°N 31.2287°E
- Country: Turkey
- Province: Ankara
- District: Nallıhan
- Population (2022): 47
- Time zone: UTC+3 (TRT)

Yukarıkavacık is a neighbourhood in the municipality and district of Nallıhan, Ankara Province, Turkey. Its population is 47 (2022).
