= Yukarıbağdere, Nallıhan =

Yukarıbağdere
- Neighbourhood
- Location in Turkey Yukarıbağdere (Turkey Central Anatolia)
- Coordinates: 40°09′N 31°06′E
- Country: Turkey
- Province: Ankara
- District: Nallıhan
- Population (2022): 61
- Time zone: UTC+3 (TRT)

Yukarıbağdere is a neighbourhood in the municipality and district of Nallıhan, Ankara Province, Turkey. Its population is 61 (2022).
