= Yakapınar, Nallıhan =

Yakapınar
- Neighbourhood
- Location in Turkey Yakapınar (Turkey Central Anatolia)
- Coordinates: 40.2330°N 31.3031°E
- Country: Turkey
- Province: Ankara
- District: Nallıhan
- Population (2022): 132
- Time zone: UTC+3 (TRT)

Yakapınar is a neighbourhood in the municipality and district of Nallıhan, Ankara Province, Turkey. Its population is 132 (2022).
