= Uluhan, Nallıhan =

Uluhan
- Neighbourhood
- Location in Turkey Uluhan (Turkey Central Anatolia)
- Coordinates: 40.3233°N 31.0997°E
- Country: Turkey
- Province: Ankara
- District: Nallıhan
- Population (2022): 122
- Time zone: UTC+3 (TRT)

Uluhan is a neighbourhood in the municipality and district of Nallıhan, Ankara Province, Turkey. Its population is 122 (2022).
