= Göcen, Çay =

Göcen
- Village
- Location within Turkey Location within Turkey Aegean
- Coordinates: 38°23′38″N 30°43′26″E
- Country: Turkey
- Province: Afyonkarahisar
- District: Çay
- Population (2021): 121
- Time zone: UTC+3 (TRT)

Göcen is a village in the Çay District, Afyonkarahisar Province, Turkey. Its population is 121 (2021).
