= Ozanköy =

Ozanköy (literally "bard's village") is a Turkish place name that may refer to the following places:

- Kazafani, a village in the Kyrenia District, Cyprus, known in Turkish as Ozanköy
  - Ozanköy S.K., sports club based in the village
- Ozanköy, Nallıhan, a village in the district of Nallıhan, Ankara Province, Turkey
