= Çay District =

- District
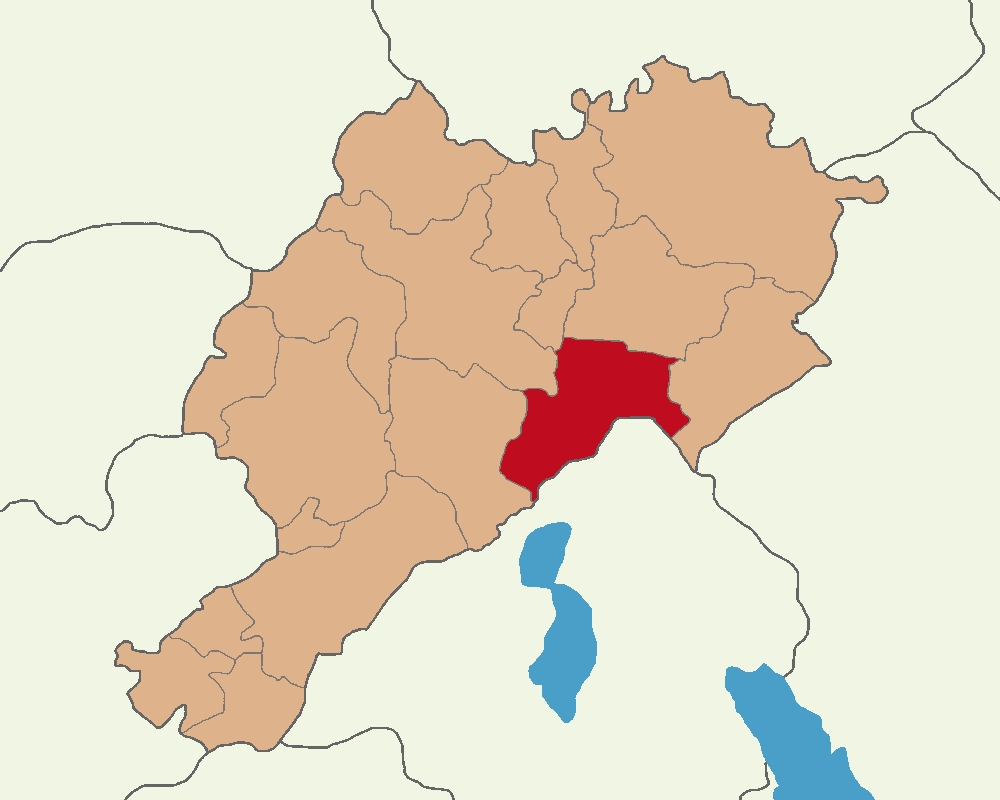
- Map showing Çay District in Afyonkarahisar Province

- Location in Turkey Çay District (Turkey Aegean)
- Coordinates: 38°35′N 31°02′E
- Country: Turkey
- Province: Afyonkarahisar
- Seat: Çay
- Area: 803 km^{2} (310 sq mi)
- Population (2021): 30,777
  - Density: 38.3/km^{2} (99.3/sq mi)
- Time zone: UTC+3 (TRT)

Çay District is a district of Afyonkarahisar Province of Turkey. Its seat is the town Çay. Its area is 803 km^{2}, and its population is 30,777 (2021).

== Composition ==
There are three municipalities in Çay District:

- Çay
- Karamıkkaracaören
- Pazarağaç

There are 20 villages in Çay District:

- Akkonak
- Armutlu
- Aydoğmuş
- Bulanık
- Çayırpınar
- Çayıryazı
- Cumhuriyet
- Deresinek
- Devederesi
- Eber
- Göcen
- İnli
- Kadıköy
- Karamık
- Kılıçyaka
- Koçbeyli
- Maltepe
- Orhaniye
- Pınarkaya
- Yeşilyurt
