= Çayırpınar, Çay =

Çayırpınar
- Village
- Location within Turkey Location within Turkey Aegean
- Coordinates: 38.5941°N 31.0930°E
- Country: Turkey
- Province: Afyonkarahisar
- District: Çay
- Population (2021): 424
- Time zone: UTC+3 (TRT)

Çayırpınar is a village in the Çay District, Afyonkarahisar Province, Turkey. Its population is 424 (2021).
