= Sangia =

Sangia (Ancient Greek: Σαγγία) was a small town in the east of ancient Phrygia, near Mount Adoreus and the sources of the Sangarius.

Its site is unlocated.
