= Koçbeyli, Çay =

Koçbeyli
- Village
- Location within Turkey Location within Turkey Aegean
- Coordinates: 38°26′N 30°55′E
- Country: Turkey
- Province: Afyonkarahisar
- District: Çay
- Population (2021): 1,397
- Time zone: UTC+3 (TRT)

Koçbeyli is a village in the Çay District, Afyonkarahisar Province, Turkey. Its population is 1,397 (2021). Before the 2013 reorganisation, it was a town (belde).
