= Devederesi, Çay =

Devederesi
- Village
- Location within Turkey Location within Turkey Aegean
- Coordinates: 38°28′27″N 30°48′49″E
- Country: Turkey
- Province: Afyonkarahisar
- District: Çay
- Population (2021): 344
- Time zone: UTC+3 (TRT)

Devederesi is a village in the Çay District, Afyonkarahisar Province, Turkey. Its population is 344 (2021).
