= Karamıkkaracaören =

- Municipality
- Location in Turkey Karamıkkaracaören (Turkey Aegean)
- Coordinates: 38°33′19″N 30°55′03″E
- Country: Turkey
- Province: Afyonkarahisar
- District: Çay
- Population (2021): 2,479
- Time zone: UTC+3 (TRT)

Karamıkkaracaören (also: Karacaören) is a town (belde) and municipality in the Çay District, Afyonkarahisar Province, Turkey. Its population is 2,479 (2021).
