= Kadıköy, Çay =

Kadıköy
- Village
- Location within Turkey Location within Turkey Aegean
- Coordinates: 38.6372°N 30.9178°E
- Country: Turkey
- Province: Afyonkarahisar
- District: Çay
- Population (2021): 235
- Time zone: UTC+3 (TRT)

Kadıköy is a village in the Çay District, Afyonkarahisar Province, Turkey. Its population is 235 (2021).
