= Aydoğmuş, Nallıhan =

Aydoğmuş
- Neighbourhood
- Location in Turkey Aydoğmuş (Turkey Central Anatolia)
- Coordinates: 40.2486°N 31.1781°E
- Country: Turkey
- Province: Ankara
- District: Nallıhan
- Population (2022): 45
- Time zone: UTC+3 (TRT)

Aydoğmuş is a neighbourhood in the municipality and district of Nallıhan, Ankara Province, Turkey. Its population is 45 (2022).
