= Cumhuriyet, Çay =

Cumhuriyet
- Village
- Location within Turkey Location within Turkey Aegean
- Coordinates: 38°35′20″N 30°57′58″E
- Country: Turkey
- Province: Afyonkarahisar
- District: Çay
- Elevation: 995 m (3,264 ft)
- Population (2021): 164
- Time zone: UTC+3 (TRT)

Cumhuriyet is a village in the Çay District, Afyonkarahisar Province, Turkey. Its population is 164 (2021).

The village was founded in 1924 after the Population exchange between Greece and Turkey. The original residents of the village are Turkish people from Thessaloniki, Greece.
