= Karacasu, Nallıhan =

Karacasu
- Neighbourhood
- Location in Turkey Karacasu (Turkey Central Anatolia)
- Coordinates: 40.3019°N 31.2405°E
- Country: Turkey
- Province: Ankara
- District: Nallıhan
- Population (2022): 95
- Time zone: UTC+3 (TRT)

Karacasu is a neighbourhood in the municipality and district of Nallıhan, Ankara Province, Turkey. Its population is 95 (2022).
