= Gökçekaya Dam =

- Location within Turkey
- Official name: Gökçekaya Baraji
- Location: Eskişehir, Turkey
- Coordinates: 40°1′58″N 31°00′59″E
- Construction began: 1967
- Opening date: 1972
- Operator: State Hydraulic Works (DSİ)

Dam and spillways
- Type of dam: Arch
- Impounds: Sakarya River
- Height: 115 m (377 ft)
- Length: 634 m (2,080 ft)

Reservoir
- Total capacity: 910 hm³
- Surface area: 20 km^{2} (8 sq mi)

Power Station
- Turbines: 3 x 92.8 MW Francis-type
- Installed capacity: 278 MW
- Annual generation: 562 GWh

Gökçekaya Dam is 43 km (27 mi) north of Alpu town 45 km (28 mi) east of province of Eskişehir in central Turkey and located 60 km (37 mi) downstream of Sarıyar Dam on the Sakarya River which runs into the Black Sea. The Yenice Dam is located downstream.

There is a hydroelectric power plant, established in 1972, at the dam, with a power output of 278 MW (three Francis turbines at 92.8 MW each), generating an average 562 GW·h of hydroelectricity annually.

The construction work on the dam and the power plant started in 1967 and was completed in 1973.
