= Bulanık, Çay =

Bulanık
- Village
- Location within Turkey Location within Turkey Aegean
- Coordinates: 38.4472°N 30.7878°E
- Country: Turkey
- Province: Afyonkarahisar
- District: Çay
- Population (2021): 261
- Time zone: UTC+3 (TRT)

Bulanık is a village in the Çay District, Afyonkarahisar Province, Turkey. Its population is 261 (2021).
