= Pazarağaç, Çay =

Pazarağaç
- Municipality
- Location in Turkey Pazarağaç (Turkey Aegean)
- Coordinates: 38°34′N 30°56′E
- Country: Turkey
- Province: Afyonkarahisar
- District: Çay
- Population (2021): 2,574
- Time zone: UTC+3 (TRT)

Pazarağaç is a town (belde) and municipality in the Çay District, Afyonkarahisar Province, Turkey. Its population is 2,574 (2021).
