= Uzunöz, Nallıhan =

Uzunöz
- Neighbourhood
- Location in Turkey Uzunöz (Turkey Central Anatolia)
- Coordinates: 40°21′45″N 31°25′31″E
- Country: Turkey
- Province: Ankara
- District: Nallıhan
- Population (2022): 152
- Time zone: UTC+3 (TRT)

Uzunöz is a neighbourhood in the municipality and district of Nallıhan, Ankara Province, Turkey. Its population is 152 (2022).
