= Çulhalar, Nallıhan =

Çulhalar
- Neighbourhood
- Location within Turkey Location within Turkey Central Anatolia
- Coordinates: 40.2569°N 31.2359°E
- Country: Turkey
- Province: Ankara
- District: Nallıhan
- Population (2022): 20
- Time zone: UTC+3 (TRT)

Çulhalar is a neighbourhood in the municipality and district of Nallıhan, Ankara Province, Turkey. Its population is 20 (2022).

To the immediate northeast of the Mount Sarıçalı National Park (Turkish: Sarıçalı Dağı Milli Parkı), the village is adjacent to the 2,530-acre national park.
