= Pınarkaya, Çay =

Pınarkaya
- Village
- Location within Turkey Location within Turkey Aegean
- Coordinates: 38.5902°N 31.0781°E
- Country: Turkey
- Province: Afyonkarahisar
- District: Çay
- Population (2021): 336
- Time zone: UTC+3 (TRT)

Pınarkaya is a village in the Çay District, Afyonkarahisar Province, Turkey. Its population is 336 (2021).
