= Ozan, Iran =

Ozan (Persian: ازان) in Iran may refer to:

- Ozan, East Azerbaijan
- Ozan, Zanjan
