= Tandzut, Armavir =

Village in Armavir, Armenia

Tandzut Տանձուտ
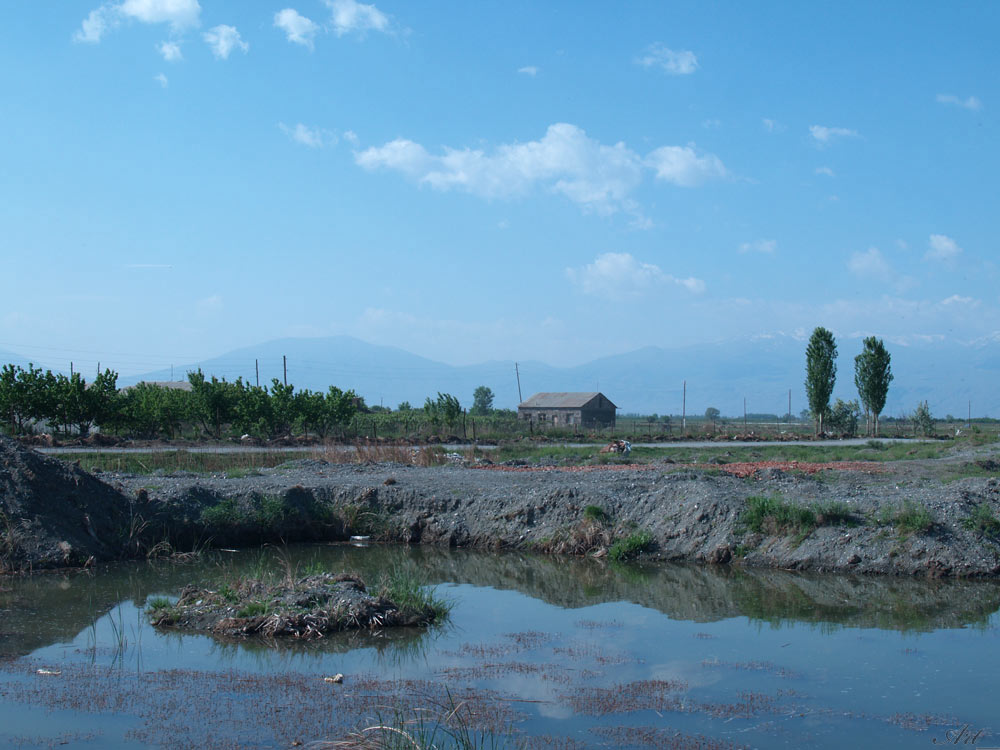

- Location within Armenia
- Coordinates: 40°04′38″N 44°05′19″E
- Country: Armenia
- Marz (Province): Armavir

Population (2011)
  - Total: 1,735
- Time zone: UTC+4 ( )
  - Summer (DST): UTC+5 ( )

Tandzut (Armenian: Տանձուտ formerly, Armutlu) is a village in the Armavir Province of Armenia.

== See also ==
- Armavir Province
