= Yenice, Yapraklı =

Village in Turkey

Yenice
- Village
- Location in Turkey Yenice (Turkey Central Anatolia)
- Coordinates: 40.6869°N 33.8483°E
- Country: Turkey
- Province: Çankırı
- District: Yapraklı
- Population (2021): 81
- Time zone: UTC+3 (TRT)

Yenice is a village in the Yapraklı District of Çankırı Province in Turkey. Its population is 81 (2021).
