= Tufashen =

Village in Shirak, Armenia

Tufashen Տուֆաշեն
- Location within Armenia Location within Shirak
- Coordinates: 40°36′N 43°54′E
- Country: Armenia
- Province: Shirak
- Municipality: Artik

Population (2011)
  - Total: 483
- Time zone: UTC+4
  - Summer (DST): UTC+5

Tufashen (Armenian: Տուֆաշեն) is a village in the Artik Municipality of the Shirak Province of Armenia.

== Demographics ==
The population of the village since 1831 is as follows:

Historical population
Year	Pop.	±% p.a.
1831	114	—
1897	617	+2.59%
1926	575	−0.24%
1939	608	+0.43%
1959	627	+0.15%
1970	570	−0.86%
1979	442	−2.79%
1989	588	+2.90%
2001	513	−1.13%
2011	483	−0.60%
