= Çay =

- Municipality
- Location within Turkey Location within Turkey Aegean
- Coordinates: 38°35′N 31°02′E
- Country: Turkey
- Province: Afyonkarahisar
- District: Çay

Government
  - Mayor: Yaşar Kemal Kantartopu (İYİ)
- Population (2024): 29,459
- Time zone: UTC+3 (TRT)
- Climate: Csb
- Website: www.cay.bel.tr

Çay (Turkish: [tʃaj]) is a town of Afyonkarahisar Province in the Aegean region of Turkey. It is the seat of Çay District. Çay district has a total population of 29,459 according to the 2024 census. The mayor is Yaşar Kemal Kantartopu (İYİ).

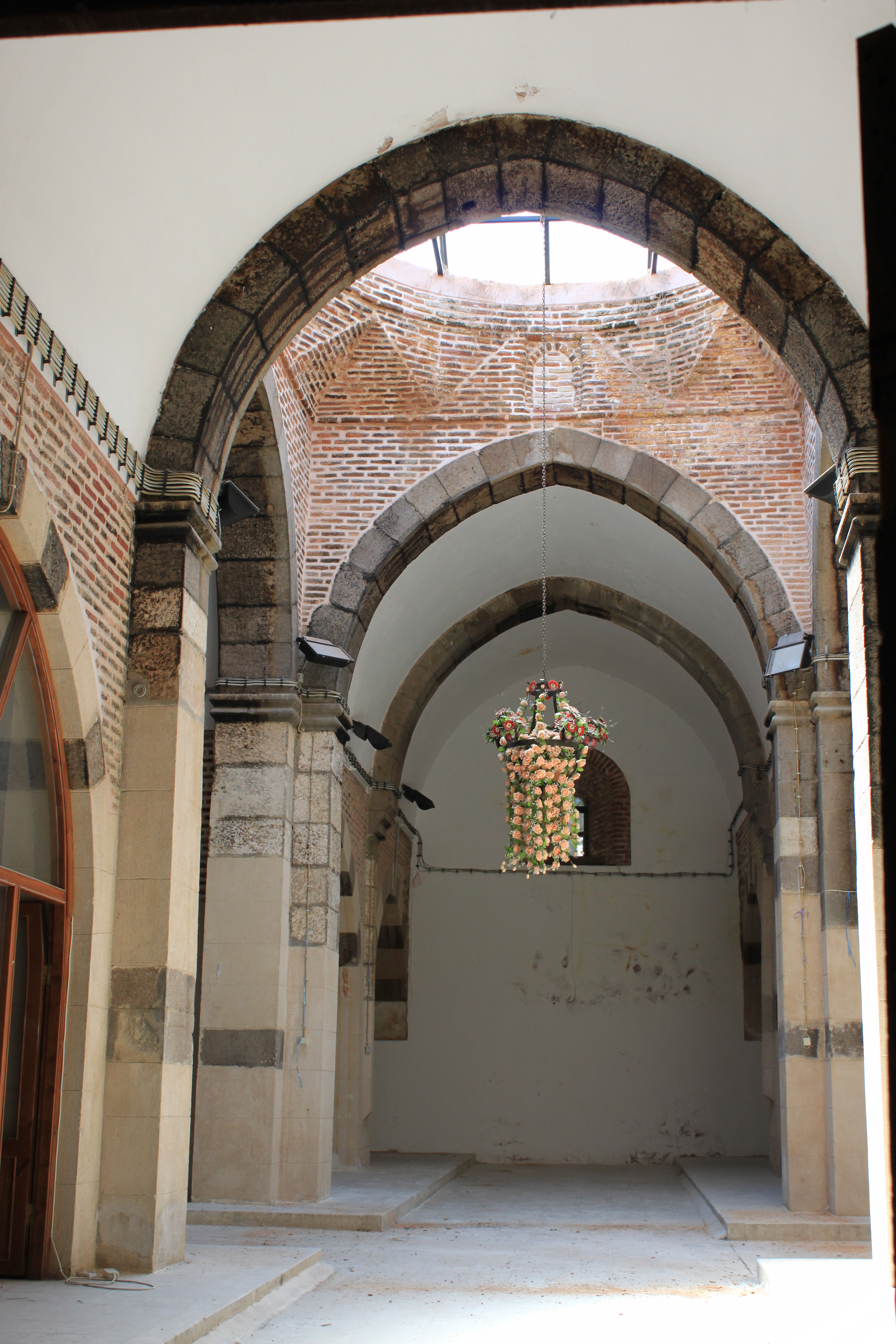
Çay Kervansaray built 1278

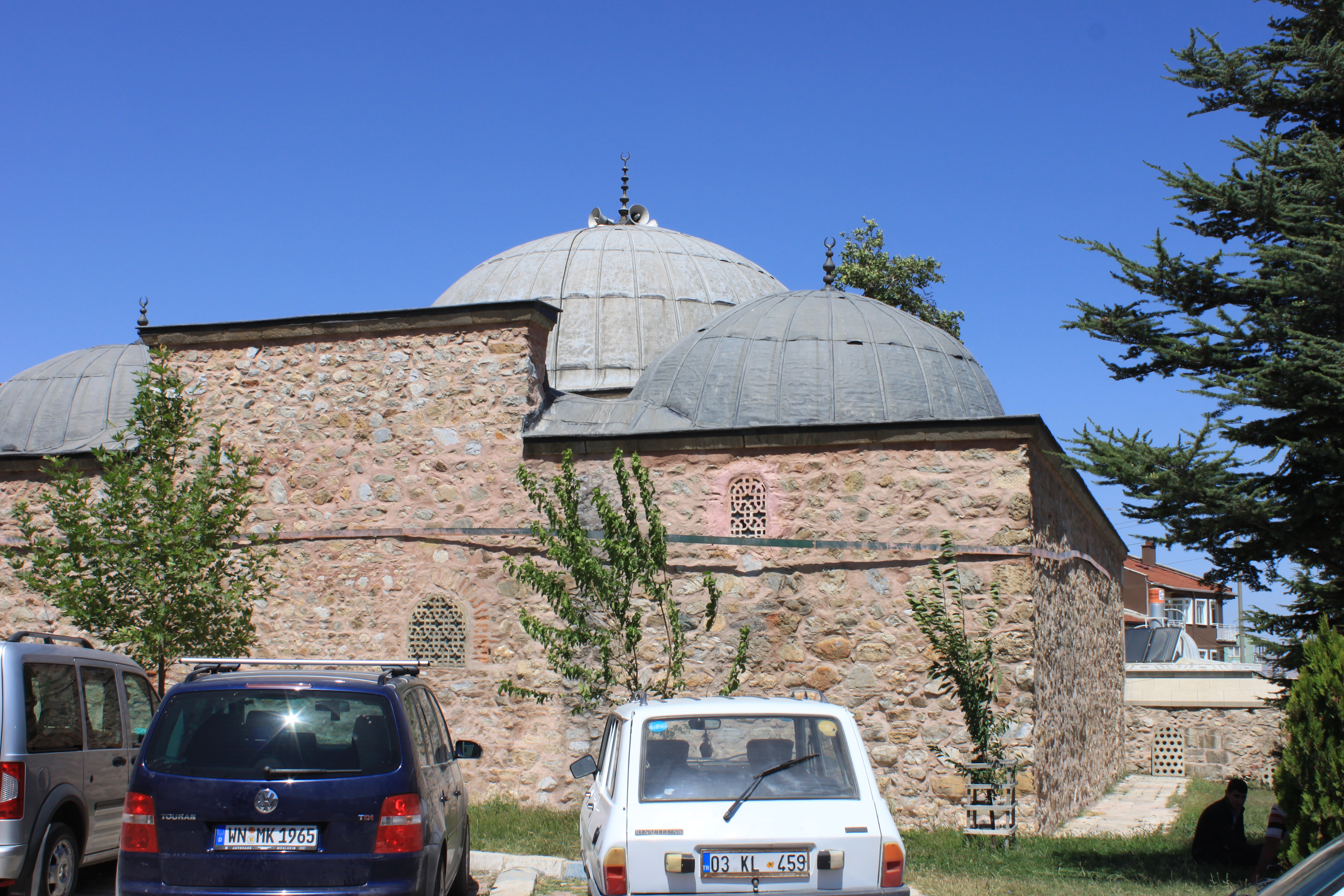
Çay; Taş Madrese of 1278, now Mosque (Sultan Alâeddin Camii); west side
