= Orhaniye, Çay =

Orhaniye
- Village
- Location within Turkey Location within Turkey Aegean
- Coordinates: 38.4861°N 30.8933°E
- Country: Turkey
- Province: Afyonkarahisar
- District: Çay
- Population (2021): 116
- Time zone: UTC+3 (TRT)

Orhaniye is a village in the Çay District, Afyonkarahisar Province, Turkey. Its population is 116 (2021).
