= Yeşilyurt, Çay =

Yeşilyurt
- Village
- Location within Turkey Location within Turkey Aegean
- Coordinates: 38.5974°N 31.0638°E
- Country: Turkey
- Province: Afyonkarahisar
- District: Çay
- Population (2021): 1,289
- Time zone: UTC+3 (TRT)

Yeşilyurt is a village in the Çay District, Afyonkarahisar Province, Turkey. Its population is 1,289 (2021).
