= Aydoğmuş, Çay =

Aydoğmuş
- Village
- Location within Turkey Location within Turkey Aegean
- Coordinates: 38.3678°N 30.7666°E
- Country: Turkey
- Province: Afyonkarahisar
- District: Çay
- Population (2021): 250
- Time zone: UTC+3 (TRT)

Aydoğmuş is a village in the Çay District, Afyonkarahisar Province, Turkey. Its population is 250 (2021).
