= Çayıryazı, Çay =

Çayıryazı
- Village
- Location within Turkey Location within Turkey Aegean
- Country: Turkey
- Province: Afyonkarahisar
- District: Çay
- Population (2021): 384
- Time zone: UTC+3 (TRT)

Çayıryazı is a village in the Çay District, Afyonkarahisar Province, Turkey. Its population is 384 (2021).
