= İnli, Çay =

İnli
- Village
- Location within Turkey Location within Turkey Aegean
- Coordinates: 38°31′3″N 30°47′18″E
- Country: Turkey
- Province: Afyonkarahisar
- District: Çay
- Population (2021): 1,508
- Time zone: UTC+3 (TRT)

İnli is a village in the Çay District, Afyonkarahisar Province, Turkey. Its population is 1,508 (2021). Before the 2013 reorganisation, it was a town (belde).
