= Ozan, Nallıhan =

Ozan
- Neighbourhood
- Location in Turkey Ozan (Turkey Central Anatolia)
- Coordinates: 40.1488°N 30.9255°E
- Country: Turkey
- Province: Ankara
- District: Nallıhan
- Population (2022): 93
- Time zone: UTC+3 (TRT)

Ozan is a neighbourhood in the municipality and district of Nallıhan, Ankara Province, Turkey. Its population in 2022 was 93.

According to the Ottoman State Archives, Ozan was first mentioned in 1487. It likely existed before this date.
