= Oya (lace) =

Various forms of Turkish lace trimmings

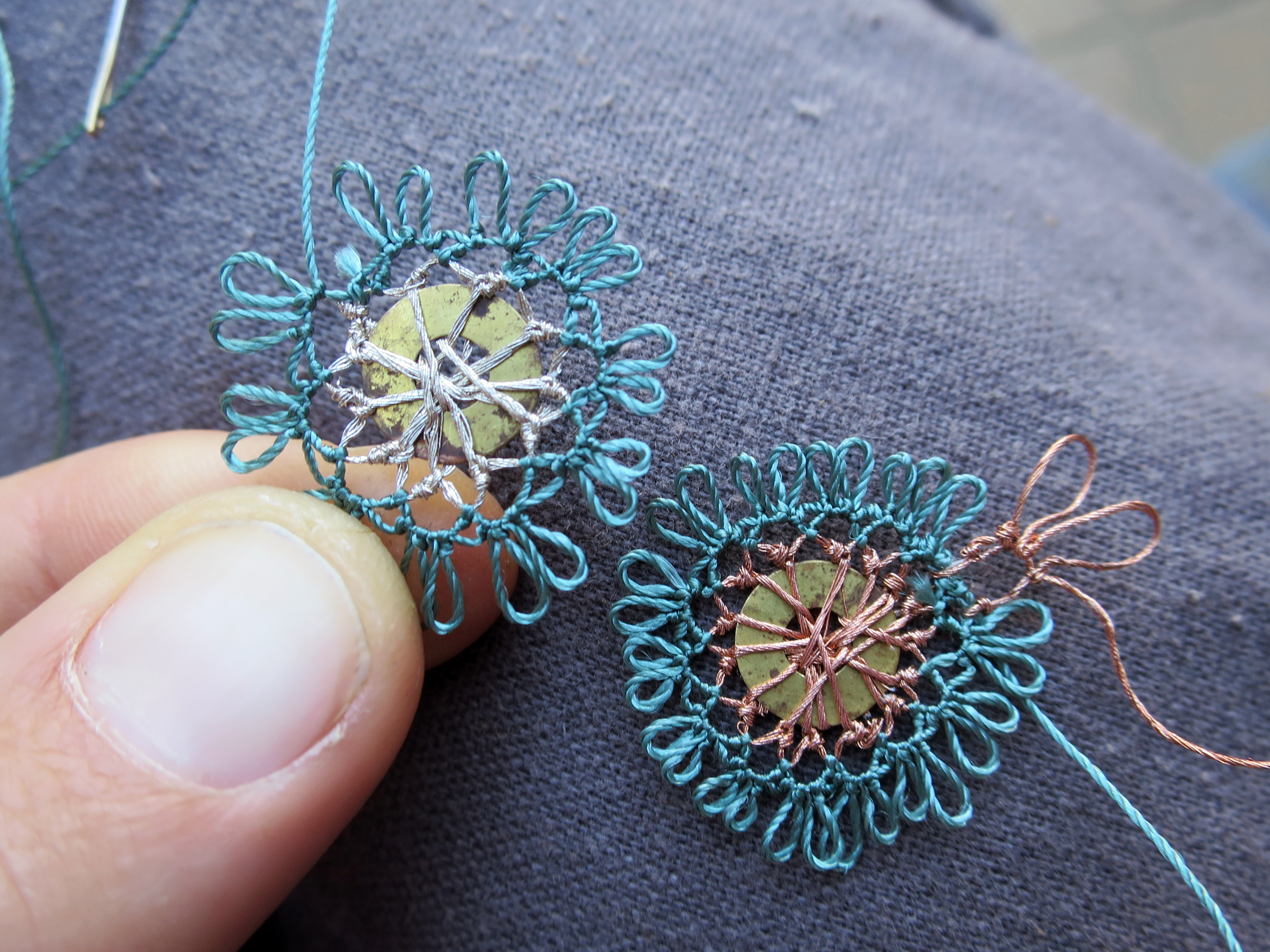

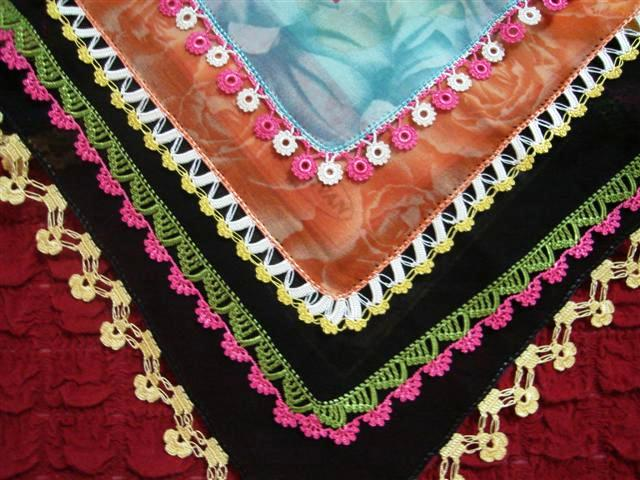
İğne Oyası

Oya, “Turkish lace”, is a Turkish word that means various forms of narrow lace trimmings, that is worn throughout the eastern and southern parts of the Mediterranean region, as well as Armenia. It is thought to date back as far as the 8th century BC, to the Phrygians of Anatolia. Some argue that the needlework and the decorate edging spread from 12th century Anatolia to Greece and from there via Italy to Europe. Oya appears in various forms and motifs, with the most beautiful examples made by aristocratic, urban and experienced women in the Ottoman palace. Today, it is still very popular among the Turkish elite and is highly sought after and very collectible.

Oya is used on headdresses and scarves of women, undergarments and outer garments alike, and frequently on household textiles, such as the edges of towels, napkins, and table cloths; in the Aegean Region even men’s headdresses were decked with layers upon layers of oya. Modern oya is also used in jewelry making. The basic types include the needle made oya (usually three-dimensional), the crochet oya and the hairpin oya. It is often combine with beads, sequins and other decorative pieces.

Young girls, new brides traditionally conveyed their love, hopes, expectations and happiness through the oya they wore. Many motifs are inspired by nature, usually the flowers and fauna found in the Turkish countryside. As the craft evolved, various motifs began to take on certain symbolic meaning, almost like a secret language between the women. For example, women would wear oya with different flowers depending on their age; older women wore tiny wild flowers while young women and brides wore roses, jasmine, carnations, violets, fuchsia; yellow daffodils signified hopeless love; a wife whose husband had gone abroad to work would warp wild rose oya around her head; a girl in love wore purple hyacinths. By the 21st century, machine-made oya is available for sale, but is not as popular as the handmade version, thought to be more “alive”.
