= Armutlu, Çay =

Armutlu
- Village
- Location within Turkey Location within Turkey Aegean
- Coordinates: 38.3997°N 30.8248°E
- Country: Turkey
- Province: Afyonkarahisar
- District: Çay
- Population (2021): 178
- Time zone: UTC+3 (TRT)

Armutlu is a village in the Çay District, Afyonkarahisar Province, Turkey. Its population is 178 (2021).
