= Armudlu, Qubadli =

Armudlu
- Location within Azerbaijan Location within East Zangezur Economic Region
- Coordinates: 39°27′39″N 46°41′04″E
- Country: Azerbaijan
- District: Qubadli
- Time zone: UTC+4 (AZT)

Armudlu is a village in the Qubadli District of Azerbaijan.
