= Nallıhan =

- District and municipality
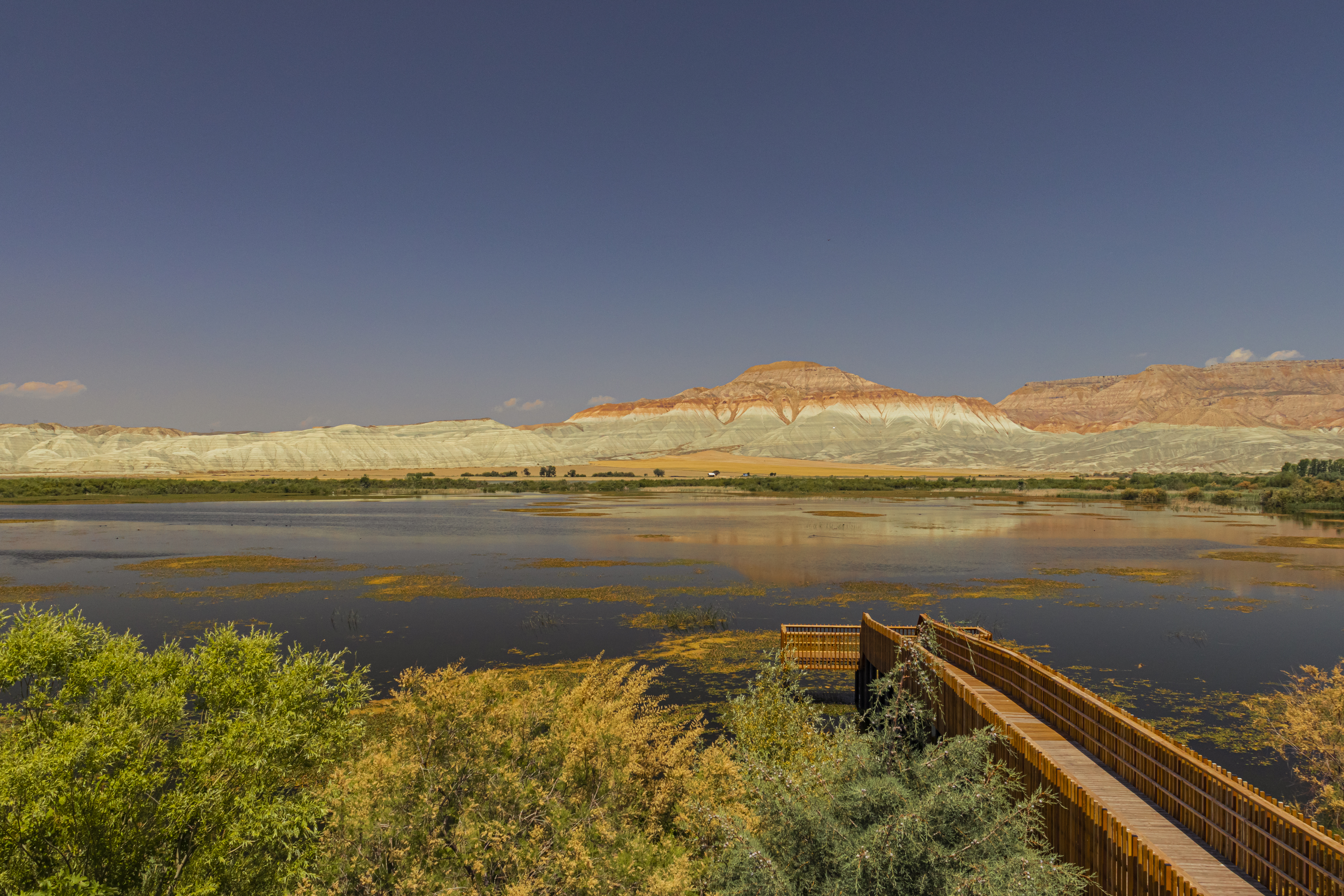
- Nallıhan Bird Paradise Sanctuary

- Map showing Nallıhan District in Ankara Province

- Location within Turkey Location within Turkey Central Anatolia
- Coordinates: 40°11′01″N 31°21′02″E
- Country: Turkey
- Province: Ankara

Government
  - Mayor: Ertunç Güngör (CHP)
- Area: 2,079 km^{2} (803 sq mi)
- Elevation: 625 m (2,051 ft)
- Population (2022): 26,553
  - Density: 12.77/km^{2} (33.08/sq mi)
- Time zone: UTC+3 (TRT)
- Postal code: 06920
- Area code: 0312
- Website: www.nallihan.bel.tr

Nallıhan is a municipality and district of Ankara Province, Turkey. Its area is 2,079 km^{2}, and its population 26,553 (2022). It is 157 km from the city of Ankara. Its elevation is 625 m.

Nallıhan is one of many towns that claim to be the burial place of Taptuk Emre, who lived in the 12-13th century, and was the teacher of the popular folk poet and dervish Yunus Emre. Nallıhan Davutoğlan Bird Paradise attracts local and foreign tourists.

== Name ==
Nallıhan is named after a caravanserai on the ancient Silk Road to the Orient next to the river Nallı. There has been a settlement here for thousands of years.

== Today ==
Silk farming, a tradition for centuries in Nallıhan, continues in many homes. Today, the town is known for its silk needlework, and local cuisine including stuffed vine-leaves, pilav, pumpkin dessert, gozleme (flat bread with cheese and potatoes filling), and many other types of more fine pastries such as baklava with locally grown walnut. The countryside is used for growing rice, wheat, barley, grapes, apples, tomatoes, and lavender. Almost everything grows in the fertile soils of Nalliah such as figs, olives, mulberry, pears, apple, persimmons, quince, hazelnut, pecans, squashes, beans, and melons.

Visitors can walk through the idyllic Ottoman villages (e.g. Akdere) and have local cuisine in the Ottoman-era Caravan Palace.

== Composition ==
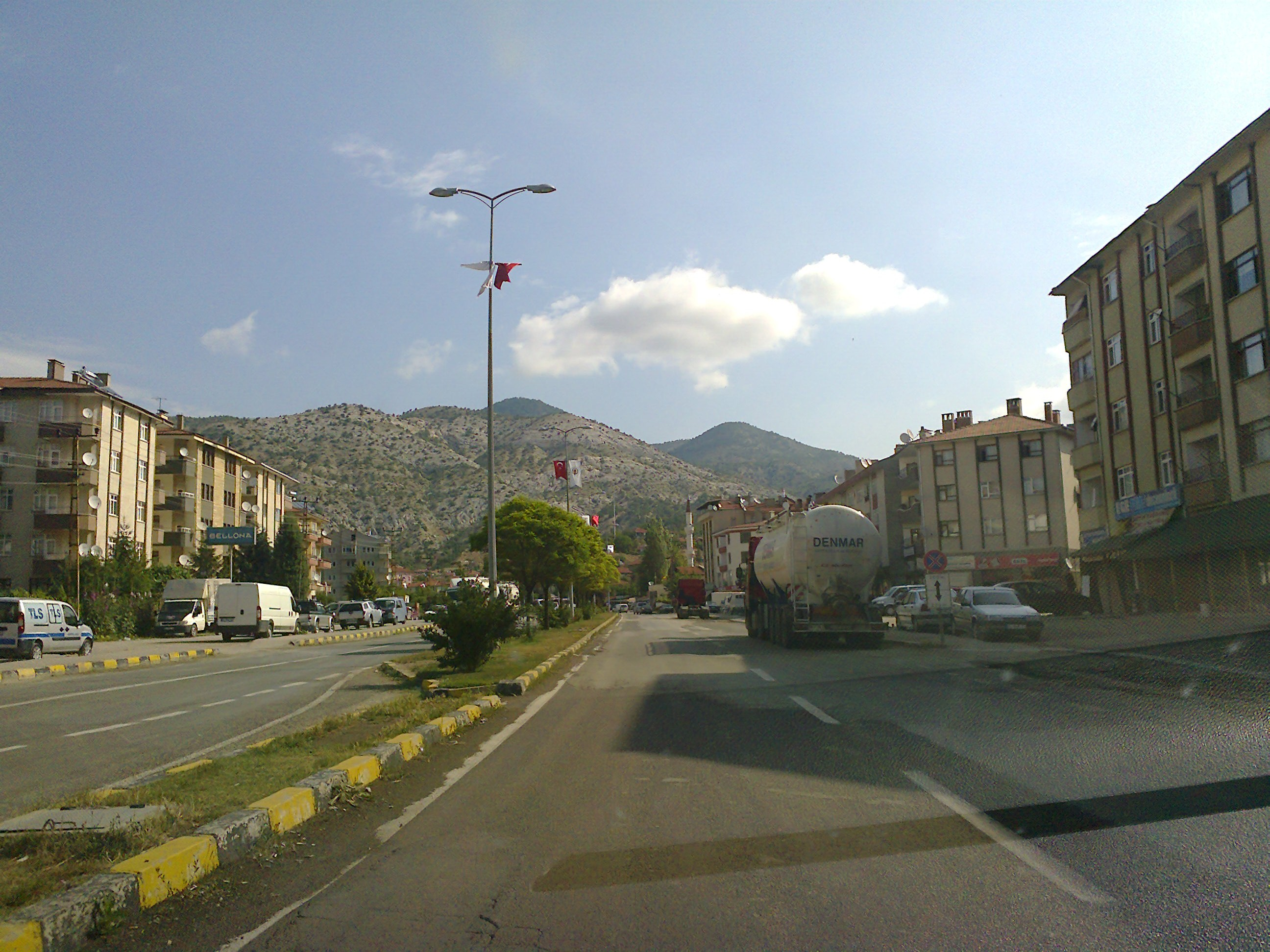
Nallıhan district center

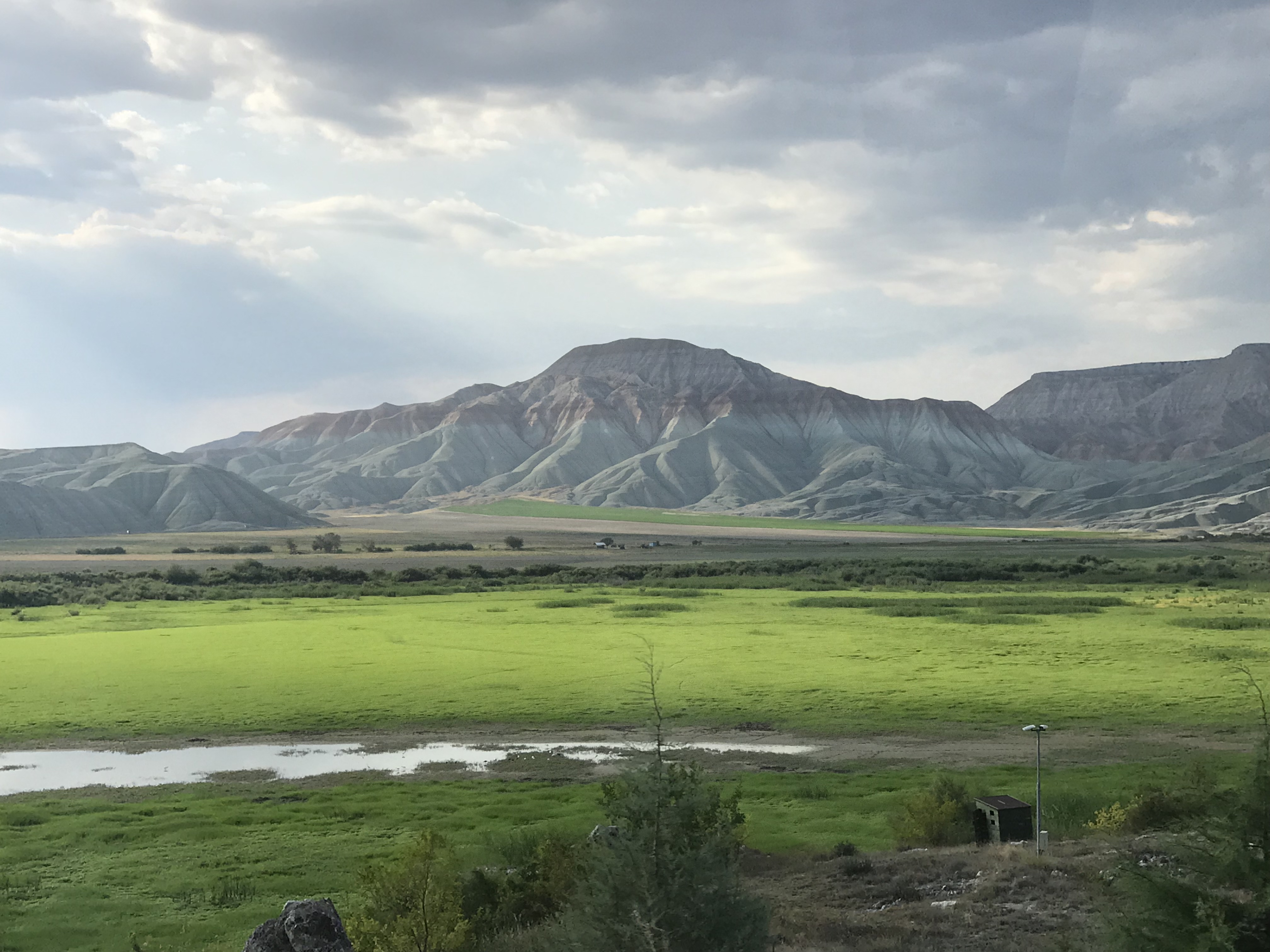
Nallıhan Bird Paradise

There are 84 neighbourhoods in Nallıhan District:

- 100.Yıl
- Akdere
- Aksu
- Alanköy
- Aliağa
- Aliefe
- Alpağut
- Arkutça
- Aşağıbağdere
- Aşağıbağlıca
- Aşağıkavacık
- Atatürk
- Atça
- Aydoğmuş
- Belenalan
- Belenören
- Beyalan
- Beycik
- Beydili
- Bozyaka
- Çalıcaalan
- Çamalan
- Çayırhan
- Cendere
- Çiller
- Çive
- Çulhalar
- Danişment
- Davutoğlan
- Demirköy
- Dereköy
- Doğandere
- Döğmeci
- Eğri
- Emremsultan
- Epçeler
- Ericek
- Eymir
- Fatih
- Gökçeöz
- Güzelöz
- Hacıbey
- Hacıhasanlar
- Hıdırlar
- İslamalan
- Kabaca
- Kadıköy
- Karacasu
- Karahisar
- Karahisargölcük
- Karahisarkozlu
- Karaköy
- Kavakköy
- Kulu
- Kuruca
- Kuzucular
- Meyildere
- Meyilhacılar
- Nallıdere
- Nallıgölcük
- Nasuhpaşa
- Nebioğlu
- Ömerşeyhler
- Osmanköy
- Öşürler
- Ozan
- Sarıkaya
- Sarıyar
- Sobran
- Soğukkuyu
- Subaşı
- Tekirler
- Tekke
- Tepe
- Uluhan
- Uluköy
- Uzunöz
- Yakapınar
- Yazı
- Yenice
- Yeşilyurt
- Yukarıbağdere
- Yukarıbağlıca
- Yukarıkavacık

== Climate ==
Nallıhan has a cold semi-arid climate (Köppen: BSk), with hot, dry summers, and chilly, damp, occasionally snowy winters.

Climate data for Nallıhan (1991–2020)
Month	Jan	Feb	Mar	Apr	May	Jun	Jul	Aug	Sep	Oct	Nov	Dec	Year
Mean daily maximum °C (°F)	5.3 (41.5)	8.4 (47.1)	13.2 (55.8)	18.6 (65.5)	24.3 (75.7)	28.6 (83.5)	32.2 (90.0)	32.5 (90.5)	28.0 (82.4)	21.3 (70.3)	13.3 (55.9)	7.0 (44.6)	19.4 (66.9)
Daily mean °C (°F)	1.3 (34.3)	3.1 (37.6)	6.9 (44.4)	11.6 (52.9)	16.7 (62.1)	20.7 (69.3)	24.0 (75.2)	24.3 (75.7)	19.9 (67.8)	14.2 (57.6)	7.4 (45.3)	2.9 (37.2)	12.8 (55.0)
Mean daily minimum °C (°F)	−2.3 (27.9)	−1.3 (29.7)	1.5 (34.7)	5.2 (41.4)	9.5 (49.1)	13.2 (55.8)	16.0 (60.8)	16.3 (61.3)	12.1 (53.8)	7.7 (45.9)	2.3 (36.1)	−0.6 (30.9)	6.7 (44.1)
Average precipitation mm (inches)	42.49 (1.67)	34.95 (1.38)	36.41 (1.43)	36.82 (1.45)	32.84 (1.29)	33.11 (1.30)	14.92 (0.59)	10.09 (0.40)	13.9 (0.55)	29.64 (1.17)	25.82 (1.02)	42.69 (1.68)	353.68 (13.92)
Average precipitation days (≥ 1.0 mm)	7.3	6.5	6.6	5.9	6.6	5.0	2.5	2.2	2.8	5.0	4.9	7.1	62.4
Average relative humidity (%)	76.5	71.5	66.2	61.7	60.5	59.1	54.7	55.1	57.4	65.1	71.3	77.7	64.6
Source: NOAA

== Places of interest ==
- Juliopolis - archaeological site from the Roman and Byzantine eras.
- Nallıhan Kuş Cenneti - Sarıyar reservoir is teeming with bird-life. It is a natural habitat for several endangered bird species in Turkey.
- Kocahan - Ottoman vizier Nasuh Pasha stopped by this place in 1599 and made it built. It is in a rectangular shape and has cafes and shops in its 46 rooms.
- Ilıca/Uyuzsuyu waterfall - The waterfall that reside in the road to Göynük, is the only waterfall within the boundaries of Turkey's capital, Ankara. It got its name "Uyuzsuyu" because there of a belief that its water cures skin diseases.
- The Mount Sarıçalı National Park (Turkish: Sarıçalı Dağı Milli Parkı) is located next to Çulhalar village in the northeast and 25 km (16 mi) northwest of Nallıhan.

== See also ==
- Sarıyar Dam
