= Sarıyar Dam =

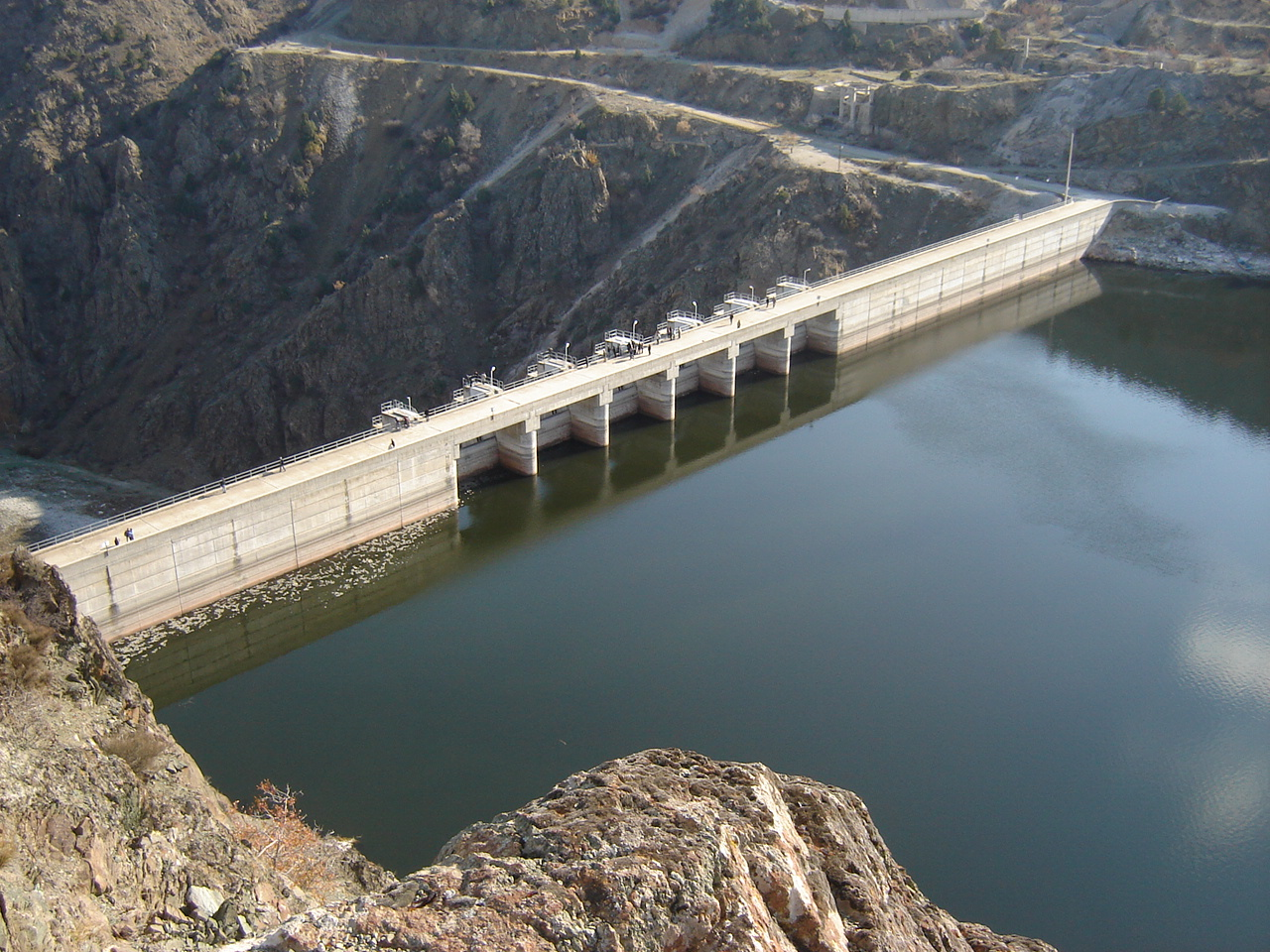
- Sarıyar Dam

- Location within Turkey
- Location: Ankara Province, Turkey
- Coordinates: 40°02′23.34″N 31°24′51.54″E
- Opening date: 1956

Dam and spillways
- Type of dam: Concrete gravity
- Impounds: Sakarya River
- Height: 90 metres (300 ft)
- Length: 554 metres (1,818 ft)
- Spillway capacity: 7,800 m^{3}/s

Reservoir
- Creates: Sarıyar reservoir
- Total capacity: 1.910 cubic kilometres (1,548,000 acre⋅ft)
- Surface area: 84 square kilometres (32 sq mi)
- Normal elevation: 475

Power Station
- Commission date: 1956
- Turbines: 4 x 40 MW Francis-type
- Installed capacity: 160 MW
- Annual generation: 400 GWh

Sarıyar Dam on the Sakarya River is 23 kilometres (14 mi) north of the town of Sarıyar in the Nallıhan district of Ankara Province. It is 125 kilometres (78 mi) west of the city of Ankara, the central Anatolian capital of Turkey. It is located 60 kilometres (37 mi) upstream of Gökçekaya Dam on the Sakarya River, which runs into the Black Sea. It was completed in 1956. The total power output from the hydroelectric facility is 160 MW (four facilities of 40 MW each).

Sarıyar Reservoir is impounded by the dam, and provides habitat for several species of tree- and cliff-nesting waterbirds and raptors. Migrating white storks (Ciconia ciconia) roost here in large numbers. Poplars (Populus sp.) grow around the shore, and provide timber and habitat for birds and other wildlife. The reservoir is polluted by agricultural runoff and untreated waste from Ankara.

== Sources ==
- Structurae: Sariyar Dam
- Researchgate.net: The technical features of Goekcekaya Sariyar and Yenice Dam Lakes
