= Sakarya River =

River in Turkey

Coordinates: 41.1264°N 30.6489°E

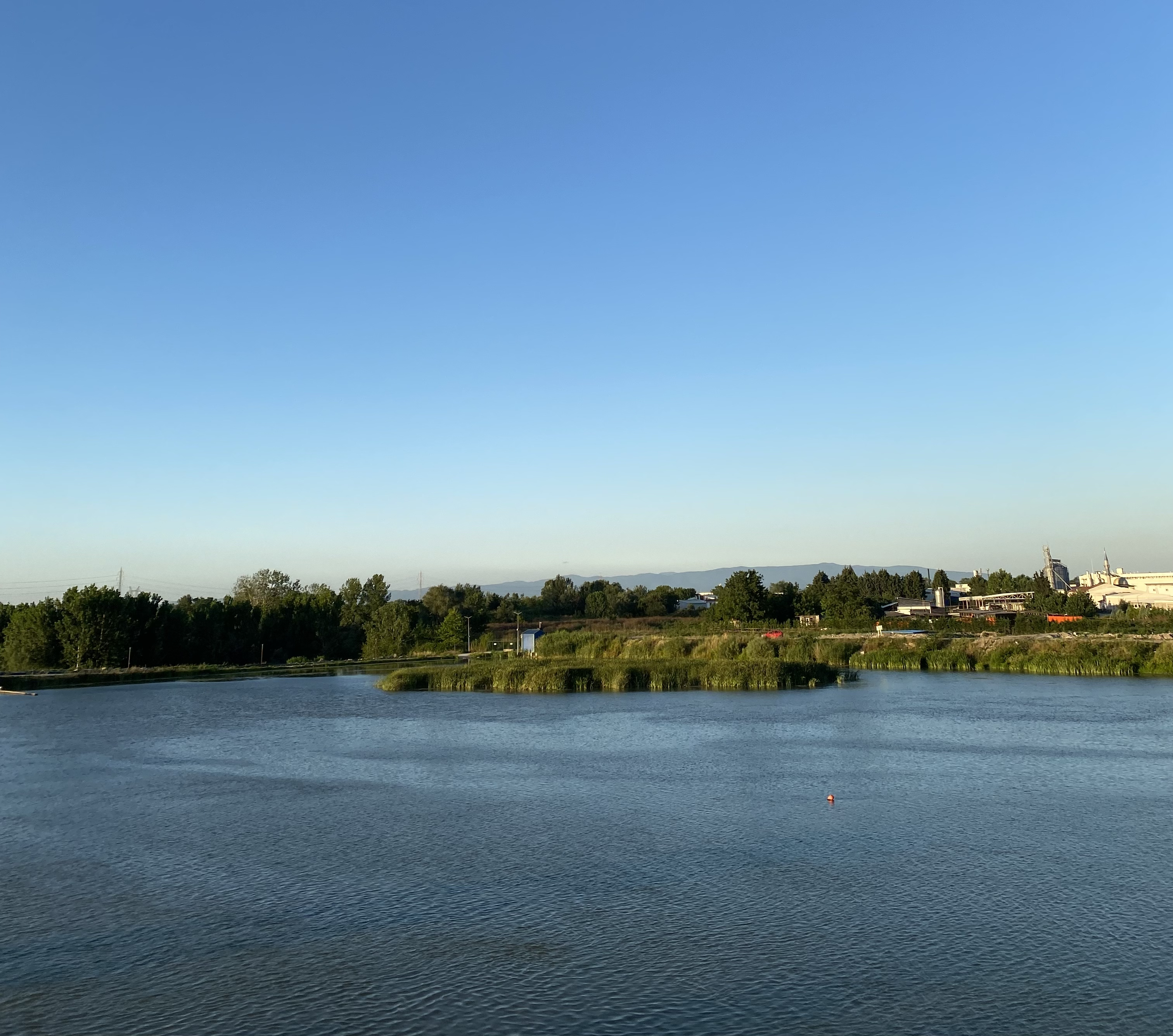

Location
- Country: Turkey

Physical characteristics
- Source
  - location: Bayat Plateau
- Mouth
  - location: Black Sea
- Length: 824 km (512 mi)
- Basin size: 55,300 km^{2} (21,400 sq mi)
- Discharge
  - average: 193 m^{3}/s (6,800 cu ft/s)

The Sakarya (Turkish: Sakarya Nehri) (Note: Hittite: 𒀀𒇉𒊭𒄭𒊑𒅀, romanized: Šaḫiriya; Greek: Σαγγάριος, romanized: Sangarios; Latin: Sangarius) is the third longest river in Turkey. It runs through the region known in ancient times as Phrygia. It was considered one of the principal rivers of Asia Minor (Anatolia) in Greek classical antiquity, and is mentioned in the Iliad and in Theogony. Its name appears in different forms as Sagraphos, Sangaris, or Sagaris.

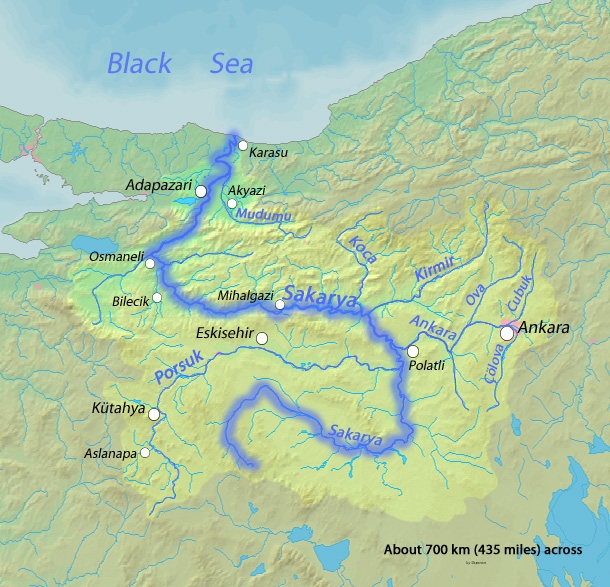
Map of the Sakarya River

In Geographica, Strabo wrote during classical antiquity that the river had its sources on Mount Adoreus, near the town of Sangia in Phrygia, not far from the border with Galatia, and flowed in a very tortuous course: first in an eastern direction, then toward the north, then in a northwesterly direction and finally to the north through Bithynia into the Euxine (Black Sea).

Pseudo-Plutarch wrote that a man named Sagaris often disdained the mysteries of the Mother of the Gods, frequently deriding her priests. She struck him with madness, and he flung himself into the river Xerobates, which from then on was called Sagaris.

Part of its course formed the boundary between Phrygia and Bithynia, which in early times was bounded on the east by the river. The Bithynian part of the river was navigable and was celebrated for the abundance of fish found in it. Its principal tributaries were the Alander, the Bathys, the Thymbres and the Gallus.

The source of the river is the Bayat Yaylası (Bayat Plateau), which is northeast of Afyon. Joined by the Porsuk Çayı (Porsuk Creek), close to the town of Polatlı, the river runs through the Adapazarı Ovası (Adapazarı Plains) before it reaches the Black Sea. The Sakarya is crossed by the Sangarius Bridge, which was constructed by Eastern Roman Emperor Justinian I (r. 527–565).

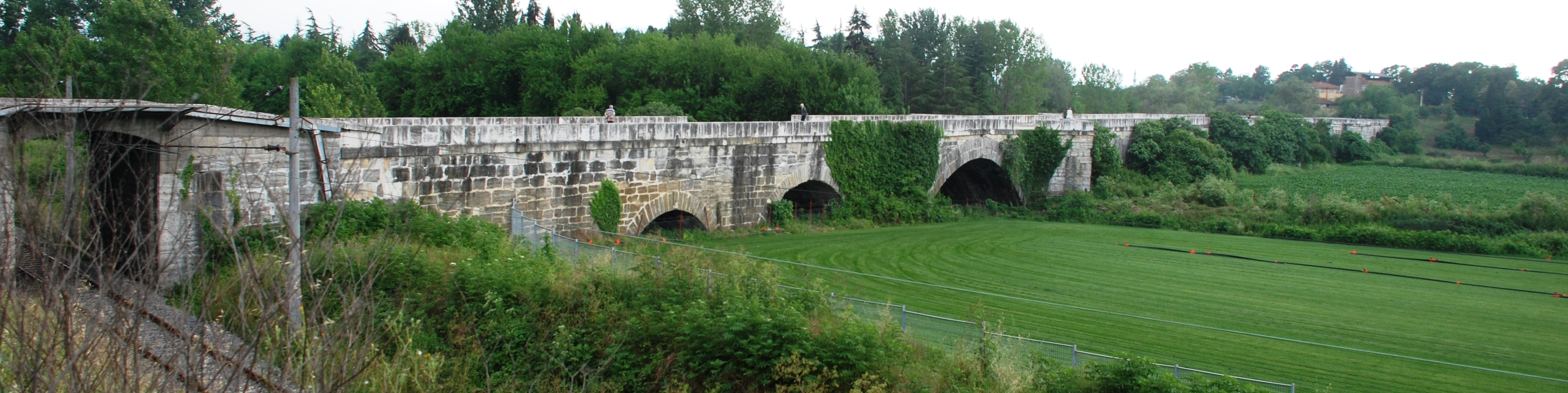
Sangarius Bridge constructed by Justinian I (r. 527–565)

In the 13th century, the valley of the Sakarya was part of the border between the Eastern Roman Empire and the home of the Söğüt tribe. By 1280, Emperor Michael VIII Palaiologos had constructed a series of fortifications along the river to control the area, but a flood in 1302 changed the course of the river and made the fortifications useless. The Söğüt tribe migrated across the river and later established the Ottoman Empire.

From downstream to upstream, the Sakarya has four dams: Akçay, Yenice, Gökçekaya and Sarıyar.

== See also ==
- Battle of Sakarya
- Sakarya Province
- Nana (Greek mythology)
