= Ankara Province =

Province of Turkey

- Province and metropolitan municipality
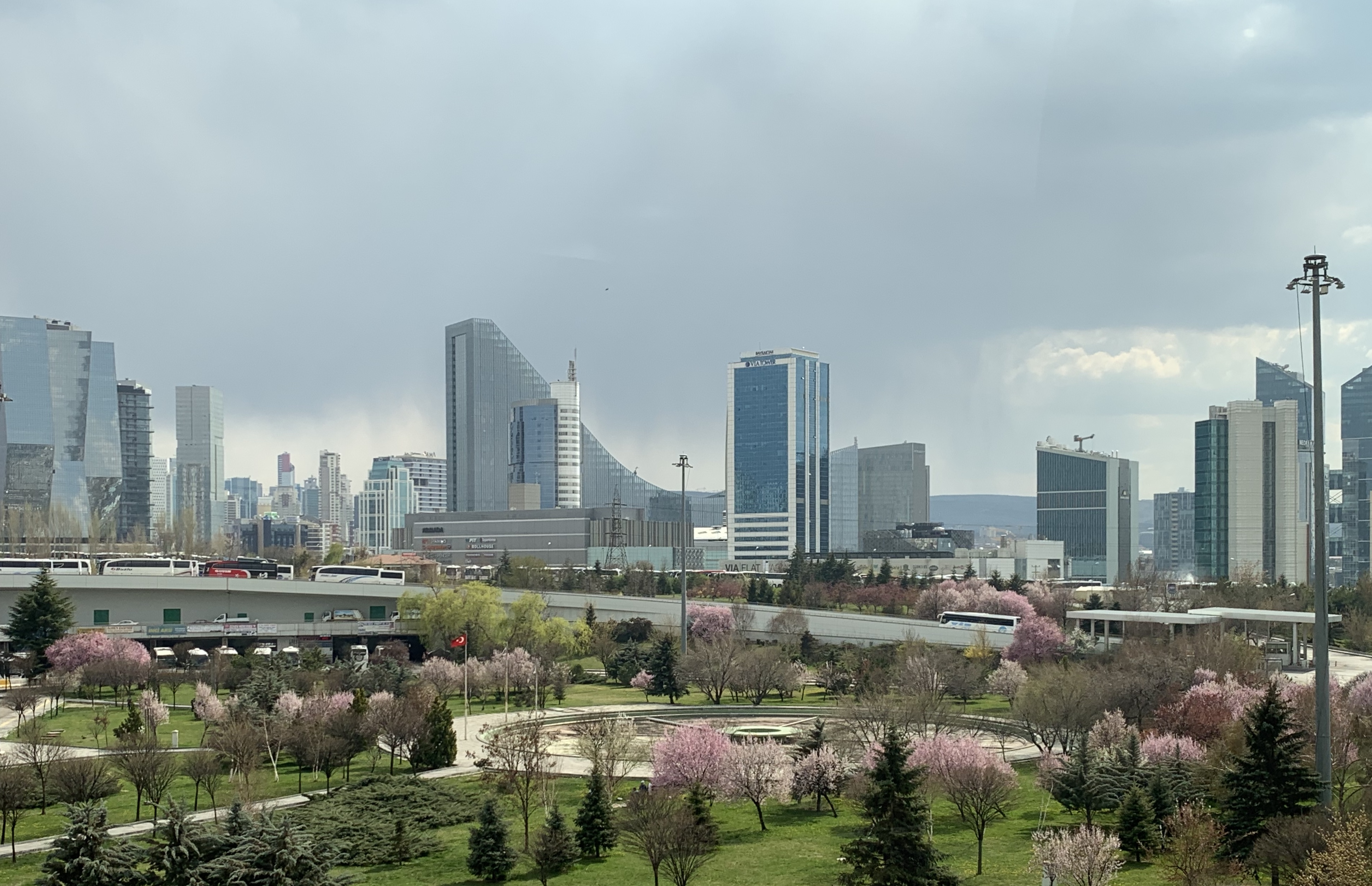
- Ankara skyline

- Location of the province within Turkey
- Coordinates: 39°36′N 32°30′E
- Country: Turkey
- Seat: Ankara

Government
  - Mayor: Mansur Yavaş (Ind.)
  - Vali: Yakup Canbolat
- Area: 25,632 km^{2} (9,897 sq mi)
- Population (2022): 5,782,285
  - Density: 225.59/km^{2} (584.27/sq mi)
- Time zone: UTC+3 (TRT)
- Area code: 0312
- ISO code: TR-06
- Website: www.ankara.bel.tr www.ankara.gov.tr

Ankara Province (Turkish: Ankara ili, pronounced [ˈaŋkaɾa iˈli]) is a province and metropolitan municipality of Turkey with the capital city Ankara. Its area is 25,632 km^{2}, and its population is 5,782,285 (2022).

== History ==
The site of the modern city has been home to settlements by many historic Anatolian civilizations in antiquity and classical times, including Phrygians, Lydians, Persians and Alexander the Great, Romans, and Galatians. The city of Ankara became a fortified stronghold of the Byzantines; it fell to the Seljuk Turks and later the Ottoman Empire. It was finally chosen by Mustafa Kemal Atatürk and the Turkish National Movement as the site of the provisional government and the Turkish parliament in 1920, and in 1923 as the capital city of the newly established Republic of Turkey.

== Geography ==
Köppen map of Ankara Province and surrounding regions:
- BSk
- Csb
- Dfb
- Dsb

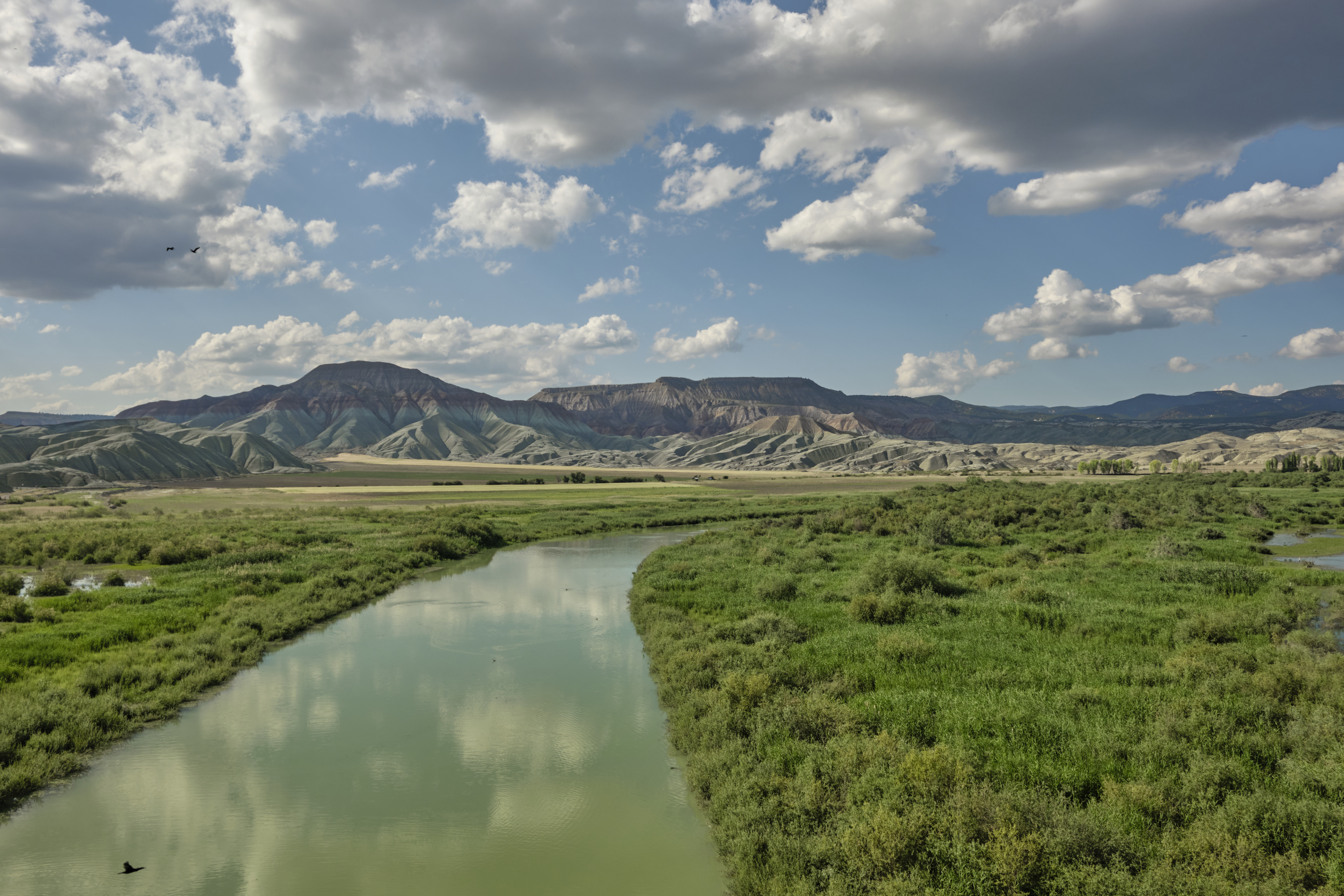
A view from Nallıhan Kiz Tepesi. A view from Cubuk/Karagol.

Ankara is mostly in the Central Anatolia region, and partly in the Black Sea region. Ankara has mountain forests to its north, and the dry plain of Konya to its south. The province is irrigated by the Kızılırmak and Sakarya River systems, the Sarıyar reservoir and many natural lakes and pools. 50% of the land is used for agriculture, 28% is forest and another 10% is meadow and grazing land. Lake Tuz, the second largest lake in Turkey, partly lies in the Şereflikoçhisar district of the province. The highest point of the province is the 2,015 meters tall Işık Mountain in the Kızılcahamam district.

=== Districts ===
Ankara Province

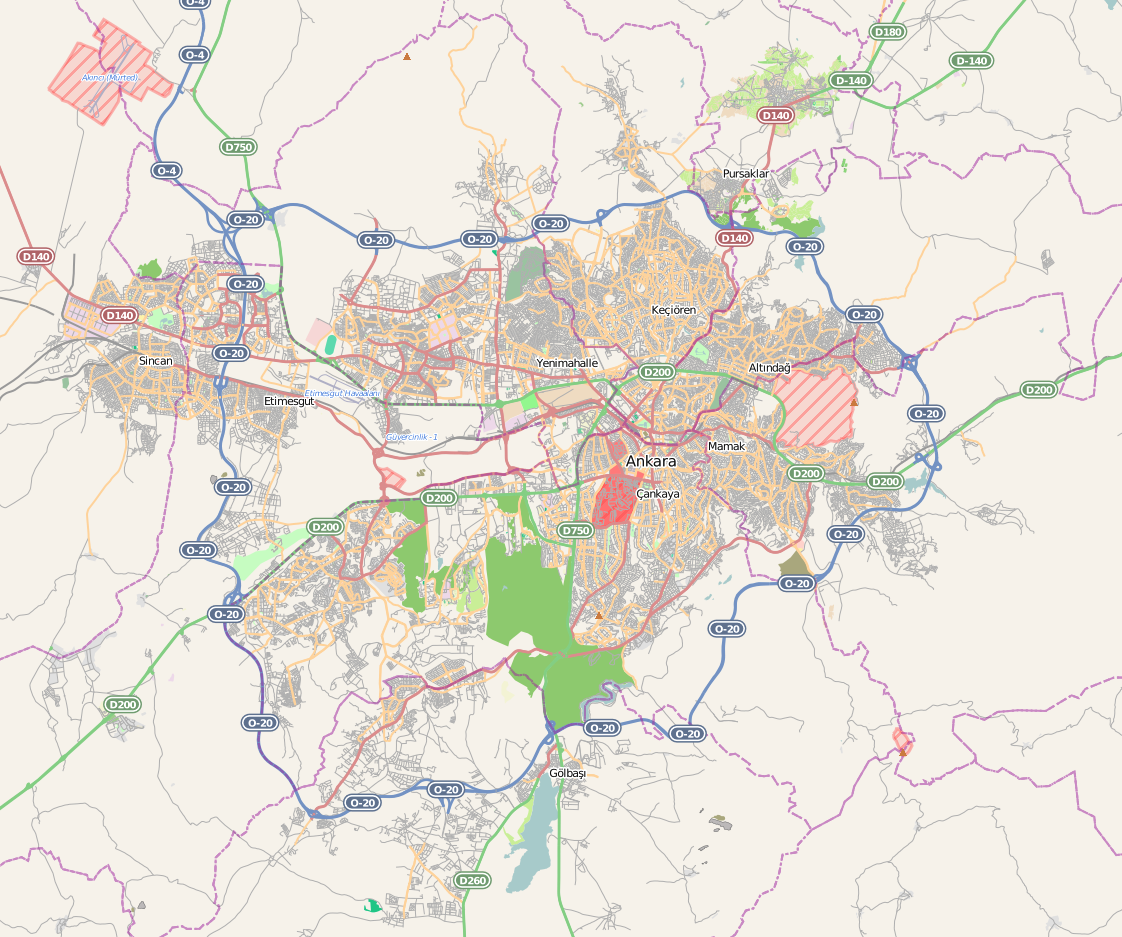
Ankara City

Ankara has 25 districts.

Number Plates (İlçe Kayıt)	District	Population (31.12.2022)	Area (km^{2})	Density (per km^{2})
1872	Akyurt	40,625	369	110
1130	Altındağ	413,994	123	3,365
1157	Ayaş	12,998	1041	12
1167	Bala	20,521	1,851	11
1187	Beypazarı	48,357	1,697	28
1227	Çamlıdere	8,100	782	10
1231	Çankaya	942,553	483	1,951
1260	Çubuk	95,449	1,198	80
1302	Elmadağ	44,379	647	69
1922	Etimesgut	614,891	273	2,252
1924	Evren	2,952	222	13
1744	Gölbaşı	150,047	1,364	110
1365	Güdül	8,079	540	15
1387	Haymana	26,016	2,164	12
1815	Kahramankazan	59,123	547	108
1427	Kalecik	12,794	1,110	12
1745	Keçiören	939,279	159	5,907
1473	Kızılcahamam	26,872	1,623	17
1746	Mamak	687,535	321	2,142
1539	Nallıhan	26,553	2,079	13
1578	Polatlı	128,378	3,618	35
2034	Pursaklar	162,389	169	961
1747	Sincan	572,609	880	651
1658	Şereflikoçhisar	33,140	2,155	15
1723	Yenimahalle	704,652	219	3,218
ANKARA City (9 districts / urban) Altındağ, Çankaya, Etimesgut, Gölbaşı, Keçiören, Mamak, Pursaklar, Sincan, Yenimahalle		5,187,949	3,991	1,300
TOTAL		5,782,285	25,632	226

District	1965	1970	1975	1980	1985	1990	1997	2007	2012	2017	2022
City center^{[a]}	130,520	114,419	94,964	77,168	no data	no data	no data	no data	no data	no data	no data
Akyurt	no data	no data	no data	no data	no data	12,535	16,229	23,354	27,201	32,863	40,625
Altındağ	229,228	348,254	526,072	624,313	406,948	422,668	394,632	370,735	363,744	371,366	413,994
Ayaş	16,936	17,581	18,325	17,202	21,762	20,806	18,352	13,159	13,087	12,289	12,998
Bala	41,415	42,206	44,735	45,158	46,940	37,612	35,295	23,505	17,397	21,682	20,521
Beypazarı	34,297	36,435	37,140	38,568	42,008	45,977	46,903	46,884	46,738	48,476	48,357
Çamlıdere	19,596	18,982	19,444	18,521	18,341	19,365	20,992	9,329	6,739	7,389	8,100
Çankaya	496,953	683,210	927,809	968,668	667,351	714,330	765,354	792,189	832,075	921,999	942,553
Çubuk	47,601	49,539	53,114	54,616	57,716	51,964	63,700	83,826	82,614	90,063	95,449
Elmadağ	20,526	23,852	25,893	30,354	32,967	38,032	38,682	48,013	43,856	45,513	44,379
Etimesgut	no data	no data	no data	no data	no data	70,800	127,395	289,601	425,947	566,500	614,891
Evren	no data	no data	no data	no data	no data	6,928	6,506	4,027	3,011	2,753	2,952
Gölbaşı	no data	no data	no data	no data	31,671	43,522	49,526	73,670	110,643	130,363	150,047
Güdül	18,314	18,153	18,919	15,688	19,460	18,698	22,473	10,676	8,656	8,050	8,079
Haymana	48,908	51,256	53,275	56,171	60,823	55,527	49,730	39,310	31,058	27,277	26,016
Kalecik	28,665	29,784	27,871	28,446	27,349	25,043	25,870	17,007	13,648	12,897	12,794
Kahramankazan	no data	no data	no data	no data	no data	21,837	26,076	36,147	43,308	52,079	59,123
Keçiören	no data	no data	no data	no data	443,390	536,168	615,448	843,535	840,809	917,759	939,279
Kızılcahamam	42,649	36,645	36,686	35,513	32,162	34,456	37,906	25,288	24,635	24,947	26,872
Mamak	no data	no data	no data	no data	379,460	410,359	405,066	503,663	559,597	637,935	687,535
Nallıhan	31,141	32,713	32,769	34,389	35,718	36,779	39,952	31,768	30,299	28,621	26,553
Polatlı	63,895	74,366	75,332	86,865	95,401	99,965	104,203	118,454	119,349	124,464	128,378
Pursaklar	no data	no data	no data	no data	no data	no data	no data	no data	119,593	142,317	162,389
Şereflikoçhisar	69,201	75,675	82,207	79,330	87,893	60,701	55,443	34,808	35,042	33,599	33,140
Sincan	no data	no data	no data	no data	59,451	101,118	220,415	413,030	479,454	524,222	572,609
Yenimahalle	122,166	175,528	246,154	330,908	382,205	351,436	507,242	614,778	687,042	659,603	704,652
Total	1,644,302	2,041,658	2,585,293	2,854,689	3,306,327	3,236,626	3,693,390	4,466,756	4,965,542	5,445,026	5,782,285

^aThe population of the city center was not included after 1980, due to the fact that Ankara received the metropolitan status.

=== Climate ===
The climate is hot and dry in summer, rainy in spring and autumn, cold and snowy in winter, wetter in the north of the province than the drier plains to the south. The annual precipitation in the city of Ankara located the center of the province is 415 mm (16.3 in), the annual precipitation of Kızılcahamam located in the north of the province is 592 mm (23.3 in), and the annual precipitation of Şereflikoçhisar located in the southeast of the province is 357 mm (14.1 in).

== Demographics ==
Historical population
Year	Pop.	±% p.a.
1927	404,720	—
1940	602,965	+3.11%
1950	819,693	+3.12%
1960	1,321,380	+4.89%
1970	2,041,658	+4.45%
1980	2,854,689	+3.41%
1990	3,236,626	+1.26%
2000	4,007,860	+2.16%
2010	4,771,716	+1.76%
2020	5,663,322	+1.73%
2022	5,782,285	+1.04%

== Places of interest ==
- The Mount Sarıçal National Park (Turkish: Sarıçalı Dağı Milli Parkı) is located next to Çulhalar village in the northeast, 25 km (16 mi) northwest of Nallıhan and 185 km (115 mi) northwest of Ankara.
- One of the most beautiful lakes of Ankara is Karagöl in Çubuk.

== See also ==
- Ankara Eyalet
- Ankara Vilayet
