= Uluköy, Taşova =

Uluköy
- Village
- Location within Turkey
- Coordinates: 40°47′8″N 36°25′5″E
- Country: Turkey
- Province: Amasya
- District: Taşova
- Population (2021): 1,047
- Time zone: UTC+3 (TRT)

Uluköy, formerly Sonusa (Ottoman Turkish: صونيسا, romanized: Sonisa) is a village in the Taşova District, Amasya Province, Turkey. Its population is 1,047 (2021). Before the 2013 reorganisation, it was a town (belde). Scholars believe this was Roman Annisa or Annesi, the site of Basil of Caesarea's family land and monastic center. Sonisa reached the peak of its regional fame during the Ottoman period, especially under Sultan Bayezid II. During the Ottoman era, Sonisa was one of the most important settlements in the lands between Amasya and Niksar.

Modern archeological site discoveries in the broader region—the valley historically known as Phanaroea, which Sonisa is part of—include Kabayar höyük and Horoztepe höyük. These discoveries are traced back early as several millennia, with some uncovered vases in the site of Kabayar höyük being preserved at Museum of the Ancient Orient.

The region has been ruled successively by several powers, such as Hatti, Medes and Persians, Pontic, Rome, Turks and Mongols (e.g. Saljuks, Danishmenids, Ottomans).

Romaic, Armenian and Turkic have left their marks on the broader region, because of inheritance and usage by subsequent inheritors and arrivals.

Basil of Caesarea founded a monastery at Sonisa, in his native Pontus, on the banks of the Iris, situated not far from the settlement, where he led a religious life with his friend Gregory of Nazianzus and his sister Macrina.

In the region, there are many tekyeh and turbeh that are visited with great respect by the people. One of these is Sayyid Ergones Sultan tekyeh. Sayyid Ergones's grave, namazgah, and chillah-khaneh carved into the rock, are all together on a high hill to the north of the town.

Evliya Çelebi, who passed through the town in 1657, mentions it in his work Seyahatnâmeh.

== Name ==
The name was passed by Republican authorities as Sonusa, following the proclamation of the Republic and stayed so until it was changed to its current name in 1962 (see Place name changes in Turkey).

Sonisa is a valuable place where great scholars have been raised since ancient times, a town that has shown generosity in raising famous and unparalleled historical figures. It was one of the important settlements of the periods of Pontus and the Romans. It was also quite famous during the Ottoman period. Furthermore, it is located on the historical road that stretches from west to east in the region, which was generally preferred by sultans and armies. Sultan Mehmed the Conqueror passed through this historical great road (Niksar, Bogazkesen, Sonisa road) when he took Trabzon and went to Istanbul. Similarly, Yavuz Sultan Selim Han used this historical great road on his return from the Çaldıran campaign. For all these and many other features, it was given the adjective "ulu", which means having very superior qualities, being sublime, high, great, and respected, and was named Uluköy in regard to its historical fame.

In the state records dating back to the era of Ottoman dynasty, it has been recorded under several orthographic styles as صونيسا (Sunisa / Sonisa), صونيسه (Sunise / Sonise), صونسه (Sunseh / Sonseh).

In Armenian, it has several varieties as Սունիսա (Sunisa) / Սոնիսա (Sonisa) / Սոնուսա (Sonusa) / Սուինոսա (Suinosa) / Սունսար (Sunsar).

It is claimed by some scholars that the center of Sonisa was known as Boinasa in the antiquity. Ptolemy mentions of a place as Boinasa (βοίνασα) in his Geographica, and later it is called by Basil of Caesarea as «οί έν Ἄννήσοις», as he mentions his monastery not far away from the settlement.

The name has a Pre-Greek Hattic suffix which in common in Anatolian settlements, such as Larissa (Λάρισσα), Nenessa, Pitassa, Sarissa and so on. This is indicates that Boinasa (βοίνασα) was a place of residence prior to Alexander the Macedon and subsequent Hellenization of the region, as Pontus was only truly Hellenized following his invasion.

== History ==
=== Antiquity ===
There are two vases discovered in Sonisa, dating back to the Hattic period (circa 1500 BCE) in display at the Museum of the Ancient Orient section of the Istanbul Archaeological Museums. These artifacts were delivered to the museum in 1940 by a local resident of Sonisa.

Moreover, the discovery of empty jars in the lands south of the town and researchers’ estimation that these jars might date back to the Hittite period, strengthens the view that the Hattis settled in this region.

=== Hellenic Age ===
After the death of Alexander of Macedon, the Kingdom disintegrated, and the Kingdom of Pontus was established. Over time, the Pontians were influenced and Hellenized, subsequently adopted Greek as their official language.

The Kingdom of Pontus lasted for three centuries, from 280 BCE to 20 CE.

The Pontus region extended from the Alis River (Kızılırmak) to Armenia, covering present-day provinces such as Erzurum, Erzincan, Tokat, Canik, Çorum, Sivas, Trabzon, Karahisar-ı Şarki (Şebinkarahisar), Gümüşhane, Rize, Muş, and Yozgat. Within these boundaries, notable settlements included Eupatoria (Magnopolis), Ameria, Caberia, Komana, and Zela. These areas were home to many royal residences and temples.

The Mihridates (Mithridates) were the founders and renowned rulers of Pontus. The most famous among them was Mithridates VI. Under his reign, the Kingdom of Pontus experienced its golden age. Therefore, he was given the title Opator or Eupator.

After ascending the throne in Amasya, Mithridates the Eupator aimed to secure the eastern side of the city and gain full control over the Iris (Yeşilırmak) basin. He had a fortress and a city constructed at the confluence of the Tozanlı and Lycus (Kelkit) rivers, approximately 7–8 kilometers east of present-day Uluköy, in a place known as Boğazkesen. He named this city Eupatoria after himself and also had a bridge built across the gorge.

Later, the famous Roman general Pompey (Pompeius) found the city of Eupatoria unfinished. He expanded its territory, increased its population, and renamed it Magnapolis.

During the Pontic era, other historical sites near Eupatoria included the city of Suna (Sonusa) and Emeri (Ameria), known as the city of priests, where King Pharnaces had built temples dedicated to Men-Ay.

In the Pontic period, the route known as Ulu Yol gained significant importance. Since present-day Uluköy was located on this road, it became one of the region's most important settlements alongside Magnopolis and Emeri.

About 36 kilometers south of Magnopolis (Boğazkesen) was Caberia (modern-day Niksar), where Mithridates’ palace was located. These cities were among the most splendid in the region, where kings and queens held hunting parties and festivities.

=== Rome ===
The sovereignty of the Kingdom of Pontus continued until Amasya was incorporated into the Roman Empire. The Romans, who brought the Pontic Kingdom under their control, did not only dominate Anatolia but also extended their rule to the eastern Mediterranean.

Strabo mentions in his work Geographica, the valley Phanaroea (Φανάροια), which Sonisa is a part of it, as:

Sidenê and Themiscyra are contiguous to Pharnacia. And above these lies Phanaroea, which has the best portion of Pontus, for it is planted with olive trees, abounds in wine, and has all the other goodly attributes a country can have. On its eastern side it is protected by the Paryadres Mountain, in its length lying parallel to that mountain; and on its western side by the Lithrus and Ophlimus Mountains. It forms a valley of considerable breadth as well as length; and it is traversed by the Lycus River, which flows from Armenia, and by the Iris, which flows from the narrow passes near Amaseia. The two rivers met at about the middle of the valley; and at their junction is situated a city which the first man who subjugated it called Eupatoria after his own name, but Pompey found it only half-finished and added to it territory and settlers, and called it Magnopolis. Now this city is situated in the middle of the plain, but Cabeira is situated close to the very foothills of the Paryadres Mountains about one hundred and fifty stadia farther south than Magnopolis, the same distance that Amaseia is farther west than Magnopolis. It was at Cabeira that the palace of Mithridates was built, and also the water-mills; and here were the zoological gardens, and, near by, the hunting grounds, and the mines.

The Romans divided Anatolia into 24 provinces. In this division, the territory of Pontus was designated as the Province of Bithynia and Pontus. The lands of Erbaa fell within the region known as Pontus Polemoniacus. This area included coastal cities like Thèrmae (Terme) and Oinòe (Ünye), as well as inland regions such as Sebasteia (Sivas), Zela (Zile), Neocaesarea (Niksar), and Magnapolis (Kale).

During the Pontic period, several significant settlements such as Boinasa (Sonisa), Megalopolis, Ameria, and Caberia (Niksar) remained among the most distinguished cities of the Pontus province during the Roman era as well.

=== Basil of Caesarea ===
Basil of Caesarea founded a monastery at Sonisa, in his native Pontus, on the banks of the Iris, situated not far from the settlement, where he led a religious life with his friend Gregory of Nazianzus and his sister Macrina.

Basil felt drawn toward communal religious life, and by 358 he was gathering around him a group of like-minded disciples, including his brother Peter. Together they founded a monastic settlement on his family's estate near Annesi.

The place is known by the local Muslim population as 'the Church Place'. It is about 2.5 km east of the town and perhaps 1 km or less from the Iris, situated at the end of a low rise, just high enough to avoid flooding from the river. Today the area consists of well-ploughed fields, scarcely offering the few ruins Guillaume de Jerphanion reported being told about.

Here Basil wrote about monastic communal life. His writings became pivotal in developing monastic traditions of the Eastern Church. In 358, Basil invited his friend Gregory of Nazianzus to join him in Annesi. When Gregory eventually arrived, they collaborated on Origen's Philocalia, a collection of Origen's works.

Evagrius Ponticus was a native of Ibora; situated not far from it was Annesi, the property of Basil, who led a religious life on the bank of the river Iris with his friend Gregory and his sister Macrina. There is frequent mention in the correspondence of these two.

=== Turks ===
The lands that included Annisa remained under Roman control for a long time. Prior to the arrival of the Turks in Anatolia, these lands also fell into the hands of the Arabs for brief occurrences.

In 1071, after Sultan Alp Arslan defeated the Roman army at the Battle of Manzikert, the gates of Anatolia were opened to the Turks. Following this victory, Turkic commanders began to gradually seize cities across Anatolia.

However, when the Roman Emperor failed to honor the terms of the peace agreement after the Manzikert victory, Alp Arslan tasked Danishmend Gazi with the conquest of key cities such as Sivas, Tokad, Niksar, and Amasya.

Danishmend Gazi successfully conquered these places. He then assigned commanders named Artuhi and Efrumiyye with 10,000 soldiers to Cabussiye (Sonusa) and Hayruriyye (Boğazkesen). These commanders subdued the areas, either by force or by imposing tribute, and brought them under their control.

With the conquest of Amasya and Niksar by the Danishmendids, numerous Turkic tribes from began to migrate from Khorasan to Anatolia.

These settlers, arriving from regions like Khorasan, Bukhara, and Turkestan, played a major role in the founding and development of Turkic-Islamic cities in Anatolia. Horasan erenleri played a significant role in the establishment and development of the Anatolian Turkic-Islamic cities settled in the region by those who came from Khorasan, Bukhara, and Turkestan.

Danishmend Gazi himself also played an important role in the Turkification and spread of Islam in Anatolia. Alongside Horasan erenleri, he personally participated in irshad that led many non-Muslim Turks in the region to embrace Islam.

One such individual was the notorious local bandit Ulgas of Sonisa, who, along with Boris of Eudokia and Sarkis of Amaseia, voluntarily converted to Islam. In recognition of their conversion and loyalty, Danishmend Gazi honored them by changing their names and appointing each as commanders in his army.

The regions of Sivas, Tokad, Niksar, and Sonisa later came to be under the rule of Kadı Burhaneddin Bey.

=== The Ottomans ===
In 1392 Sultan Bayezid I entered Sivas and ended Kadı Burhaneddin's reign, annexing the Erbaa region including Sonisa into Ottoman lands.

Sonisa reached the peak of its regional fame during the Ottoman period, especially under Sultan Bayezid II. During the Ottoman era, Sonisa was one of the most important settlements in the lands between Amasya and Niksar. Besides Sonisa, other significant settlements included Taşabad (Taşova), Frenkhisar, Ziğdi (Karayaka), Herek, Bidevi (Esençay), and Eksel (Koçak). Among these, Sonisa (Uluköy), Bidevi, and Eksel were the largest.

During the Ottoman era, a historical “ulu yol” stretched west to east through the region, favored by armies and caravans. Sonisa's location on this road further increased its importance. This road was commonly used by sultans and armies. Since Amasya was the city where Ottoman princes were raised, Ottoman sultans knew this region well. For example, Mehmed II chose the route passing through Niksar (Neocaesarea) - Bogazkesen (the bridge near Eupatoria) - Sonisa (Uluköy) when traveling from Trabzon to Istanbul, and he entrusted the Sanjak of Morea to Kızıl Ahmed upon reaching Sonisa. Similarly, Selim I returned from the Chaldiran campaign by traveling the Niksar - Hayati - Sonisa route, celebrating Ramadhan in Niksar.

The famous traveler Evliya Çelebi, during his journey in 1643, also preferred the Niksar - Bogazkesen - Sonisa route and described Sonisa in his work Seyahatnâmeh as:

Menzil-i Karye-i Sonisa: An inhabited small town in the land of Sivas on the border of Niksar with three-hundred household and with mosque and with caravanserai and with masjids, with bagh and small-garden.

Sonisa was especially important during the reign of Bayezid II, evidenced by historical structures like the Kurşunlu Mosque (also known as Kapı Ağası Hüseyin Ağa Mosque) and the Sinan Paşa Hamam, both dating to this period. It is also recorded that a madrasa built by Kapu Ağası Hüseyin Ağa once existed there.

In the 16th century, Sonisa was a nahiye (administrative district) including many villages such as Akça, Alinek, Ballıbağ, Çalkara, Çesmeli, Çevresu, Değirmenli, Demirtaş, Evyaba, Evciler, Gökbel, Hacı Pazar, Küçük Hacı Pazar, Karaağaç, Karayaka, Keçeci, Kızılçubuk, Salkımören, Tosunlar, and Üzümlü.

=== Tanzimat ===
While Sonisa was a prominent and famous settlement in the 16th century, nearby Herek and Taşabad were much smaller villages at that time. By the 1800s, Sonisa, along with Taşabad, Herek, and Karayaka, were grouped administratively as the district of Kaza-i Erbaa (meaning “four nahiyes”). These four were officially recorded as Nevahi-i Erbaa (“four nahiyes”).

Sonisa maintained its importance until the establishment of Erbaa district. Until 1859, Erbaa was a village dependent on Sonusa (Uluköy). After 1859, when Bujak of Herek (sub-district) was established by detaching Herek from Bujak of Sonisa, thence area was ttansferred to Amasya Sanjak. In short, until 1859, Herek was under Sonisa, and after Kaza-i Erbaa was established with Herek becoming its seat, thence Sonisa was linked to Erbaa.

Sonisa was visited by William John Hamilton. He mentions in his book, Researches in Asia Minor, Pontus, and Armenia with Some Account of Their Antiquities and Geology, as:

We started from Sepetli a few minutes after six, and for upwards of six miles descended the valley S.E. by E., always keeping near the banks of the stream ; the valley became gradually much wider, the hills lower and more cultivated, walnut and plane-trees flourished in the plain, and by means of careful irrigation a good crop of Indian corn was ripening on the ground. At a quarter after eight we left the stream flowing S. by E. through a narrow opening in the hills into the valley of the Iris, and crossed in an easterly direction an open corn country, sloping towards the S.W., and then descended gently to the village of Sonnisa, situated on the hills which form the N.W. boundary of the plain, in which the junction of the Iris and the Lycus takes place two hours to the east of Sonnisa. There can therefore be no doubt that this plain is the ancient Phanarœa mentioned by Strabo ; which is now divided into four districts or cantons, viz. Herek, Tashova, Sonnisa, and Carai-oka, but it generally goes by the name of Tashova. The course of the Iris as seen from hence is from S.W. to N.E.

My expectations of finding ruins at Sonnisa were again disappointed, an old Turkish bath still in use, a mosque of ancient date almost in ruins, and a nondescript stone building with fragments of columns lying about it, but evidently of Turkish construction, constituting the boasted antiquities of this place; but I was told that there were some in the valley below, where the united streams of the Lycus and the Iris flowed out of the plain, which were called Boghaz Hissan Kaleh ; but I feared they would not prove to be Eupatoria or Magnopolis. I was also positively assured that no ruins whatever existed in the plain itself, which is probable,, for there was little or no wood to conceal them. The whole plain belongs to Hadji Oglu, one of the former Dere Beys, who resides at Herek. I determined, instead of returning to Amasia, to follow the route given me by the Agha of Ladik, and to visit Boghaz Hissan Kaleh on my way to Herek and Niksar.

In answer to my inquiries at Sonnisa, where I was delayed some time for want of horses, I was told that the best cultivated land in the plain produced seven or eight fold, and the price of wheat was twenty piastres the kilo, which here consisted of sixteen batmans. Strabo, in his description of the Phanarœa, calls it έλαιόφυτον πεδιόν; * now no olives grow there in the present day, whether cultivated or wild ; and from its elevation and position I should doubt whether they had ever flourished in this plain. I shall have occasion to mention another district to which Strabo has applied the same epithet, equally inappropriate at the present day; I am therefore inclined to think that the geographer merely intended to say that it was a fertile plain, producing in abundance the most useful fruits.
