= Cabira =

Town of ancient Pontus in Asia minor

Coordinates: 40°35′22″N 36°57′18″E

- τὰ Κάβειρα (Greek)
- Kabeira
- Interactive map of Cabira
- Type: Town
- Region: Pontus (present-day Turkey)

Cabira or Kabeira (/kəˈbaɪrə/; Greek: τὰ Κάβειρα) was a town of ancient Pontus in Asia minor, at the base of the range of Paryadres, about 150 stadia south of Eupatoria or Magnopolis, which was at the junction of the Iris and the Lycus.

== History and views ==
Eupatoria was in the midst of the plain called Phanaroea, whereas Cabira, as Strabo says was at the base of the Paryadres. Mithridates VI built a palace at Cabira; and there was a water-mill there (Greek: ὑδραλέτης), and places for keeping wild animals, hunting grounds, and mines. Less than 200 stadia from Cabira was the remarkable rock or fortress called Caenon (Greek: Καινόν [χωρίον]), where Mithridates kept his most valuable things. Cn. Pompeius took the place and its treasures, which, when Strabo wrote, were in the Roman Capitol. In Strabo's time a woman, Pythodoris, the widow of King Polemon, had Cabira with the Zelitis and Magnopolitis. Pompeius made Cabira a city, and gave it the name Diospolis (Διόσπολις). Pythodoris enlarged it, gave it the name Sebaste (Σεβαστή), which is the Greek equivalent to Augusta, and used it as her royal residence. Near Cabira probably at a village named Ameria, there was a temple with a great number of slaves belonging to it, and the high priest enjoyed this benefice. The god Men of Pharnaces (Μήν Φαρνάκου) was worshipped at Cabira. Mithridates was at Cabira during the winter that L. Lucullus was besieging Amisus and Eupatoria. Lucullus afterwards took Cabira. There are some autonomous coins of Cabira with the epigraph "Καβηρων".

=== Strabo ===
Strabo, a native of Amasia, could not be unacquainted with the site of Cabira. The only place that corresponds to his description is Niksar, on the right bank of the Lycus, nearly 43 km from the junction of the Iris and the Lycus. But Niksar is the ancient Neocaesarea, a name which first occurs in Pliny, who says that it is on the Lycus. There is no trace of any ancient city between Niksar and the junction of the two rivers, and the conclusion that Niksar is a later name of Cabira, and a name more recent than Sebaste, seems certain. Neocaesarea seems to have arisen under the early Roman emperors.

=== John Cramer ===
John Cramer states that the earliest coins of Neocaesarea bear the effigy of Tiberius; but Sestini, quoted by Albert Forbiger, assigns the origin of Neocaesarea to the time of Nero, about 64 CE, when Pontus Polemoniacus was made a Roman province. The simplest solution of this question is that Neocaesarea was a new town, which might be near the site of Cabira. It was the capital of Pontus Polemoniacus, the birthplace of Gregorius Thaumaturgus, and the place of assembly of a church council in 314. Ammianus Marcellinus calls it the most noted city of Pontus Polemoniacus: it was, in fact, the metropolis. According to Paulus Diaconus the place was destroyed by an earthquake.

Cramer supposes that Neocaesarea is identical with Ameria, and he adds that Neocaesarea was the principal seat of pagan idolatry and superstitions, which affords another presumption that it had risen on the foundation of Ameria and the worship of Men Pharnaces. But Ameria seems to have been at or near Cabira; and all difficulties are reconciled by supposing that Cabira, Ameria, Neocaesarea were in the valley of the Lycus, and if not on the same spot, at least very near to one another. Stephanus of Byzantium adds to our difficulties by saying or seeming to say that the inhabitants were also called Adrianopolitae, suggesting that Adrianopolis or Hadrianopolis was still another name of the city in his time. Where he got this from, nobody can tell. Modern scholars identify Hadriane as a name borne by the town.

Hamilton was informed at Niksar that on the road from Niksar to Sivas, and about fourteen hours from Niksar, there is a high perpendicular rock, almost inaccessible on all sides, with a stream of water flowing from the top, and a river at its base. This is exactly Strabo's description of Caenon.

== Modern location ==
Modern scholars fix its site at modern Niksar, Asiatic Turkey.

== See also ==
- Battle of Cabira
- Coinage of the Kingdom of Pontus
