= Themiscyra =

Themiscyra may refer to:

- Themiscyra (Pontus), an ancient Greek town, the home of the legendary Amazons
- Themyscira (DC Comics), the fictional island home of DC Comics' Wonder Woman and her fellow Amazons
- Themiscyra Plain, an ancient plain located in modern-day Turkey
- Themiscyra (moth) or Lactura, a genus of ermine moths
