= Lake Boraboy =

Lake in Amasya Province, Turkey

- Boraboy Gölü (Turkish)
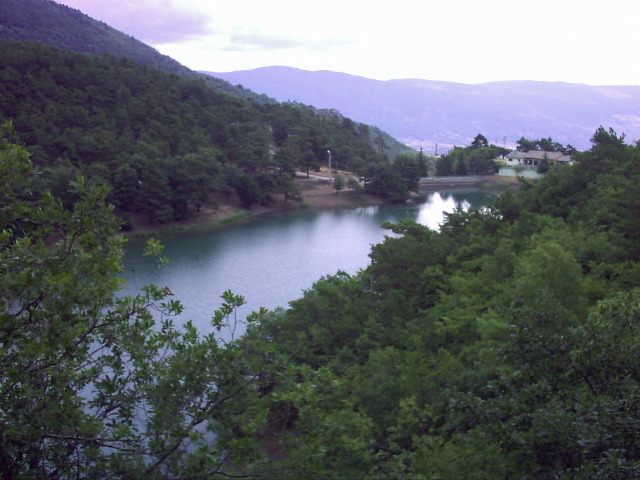
- Lake Boraboy

- Location of the lake in Turkey.
- Location: Boraboy, Taşova, Amasya Province, Turkey
- Coordinates: 40°48′13″N 36°09′13″E
- Type: Landslide dam
- Basin countries: Turkey
- Max. length: 675 m (2,215 ft)
- Max. width: 175 m (574 ft)
- Surface area: 4 ha (9.9 acres)
- Max. depth: 11 m (36 ft)

Lake Boraboy, also known as Lake Kocabey, (Turkish: Boraboy Gölü or Kocabey Gölü) is a landslide-dammed lake in Amasya Province, Turkey. The lake and its surroundings were declared a nature park in 2014.

The lake is in Taşova ilçe (district) of Amasya Province It is situated to the west of the town Boraboy. Its distance to Taşova is 21 km (13 mi) and to Amasya is 61 km (38 mi).

The lake is situated in the 1,051 m (3,448 ft)-high, east-west-oriented valley on the Black Sea Mountains. It was formed when the river was blocked by a landslide. The landslide dam was strengthened later with a concrete weir to avoid its split off by flooding. It is 675 m (2,215 ft) long and has a maximum width of 175 m (574 ft). Its total area is around 4 ha (9.9 acres). Its maximum depth is 11 m (36 ft).

The lake freezes in the winter time.

== Nature park ==
The lake area was declared a nature park by the Ministry of Environment and Forest in 2014. It covers an area of 259 ha (640 acres), being mostly state-owned forest and a small part agricultural field. Average elevation of the nature park is 1,215 m (3,986 ft). The highest place is Kaleboynu Hill at 1,383 m (4,537 ft).

On the northern slopes of the nature park, the common tree species are oriental beech (Fagus orientalis), black pine (Pinus nigra), Scots pine (Pinus sylvestris L.), Turkey oak (Quercus cerris) and endemic oak while the vegetation on the southern slopes is mostly diverse shrubs.

The northern bank of the lake is less inclined and provides so place for picnicking. The nature park offers outdoor recreational activities such as hiking, motocross, off-roading, wildlife photography. There are some accommodation facilities of the Ministry of Forestry and the municipality of the town Boraboy.
