= Lake Simenit =

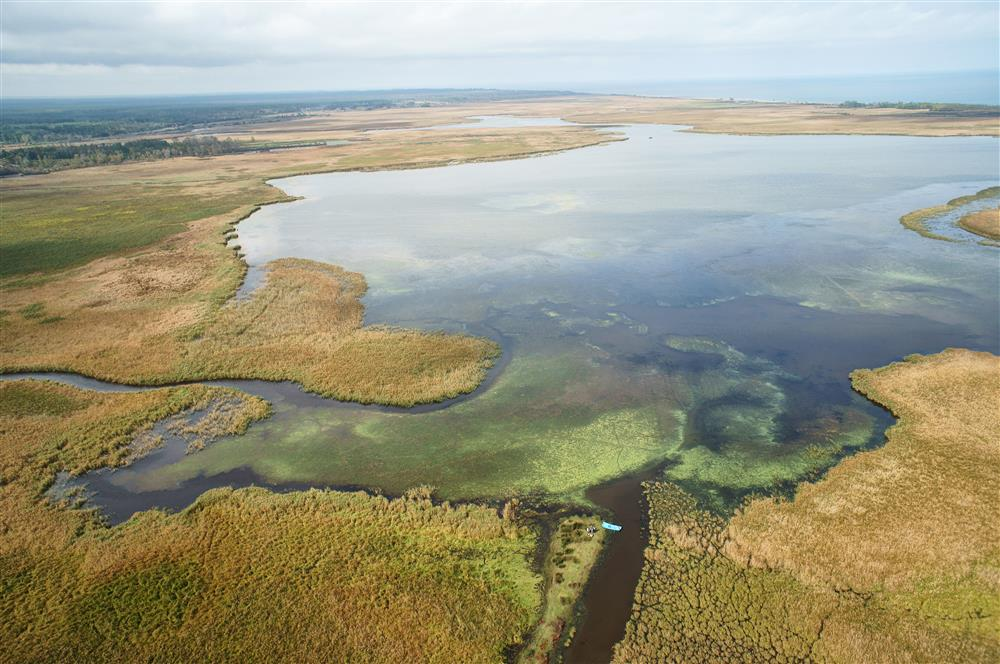
- Lake Simenit
- Interactive map of Lake Simenit
- Coordinates: 41°18′N 36°55′E
- Type: Salty, Marsh, Wetland Lagoon
- Primary inflows: Flumes and drainage channels
- Primary outflows: flows into the Black Sea when autumn periods
- Surface area: 19 km^{2} (7.3 sq mi)
- Average depth: 1–2 metres (3 ft 3 in – 6 ft 7 in)
- Max. depth: 5 metres (16 ft)
- Surface elevation: 4 metres (13 ft)

Lake Simenit, also known as Lake Simenlik, is a lake in Samsun, Turkey. It is situated in east of Yesilırmak plain of central Black Sea Region. it is located entirely in district of Terme, Samsun. The surface area of the Lake simenit is 19 kilometers in conjunction with surrounded reed beds and marshes. 'Semenlik', 'Simenlik', 'Karasu' and 'Arapsazı' names were used for the lake in the past years.
