= Alpaslan, Taşova =

Alpaslan
- Village
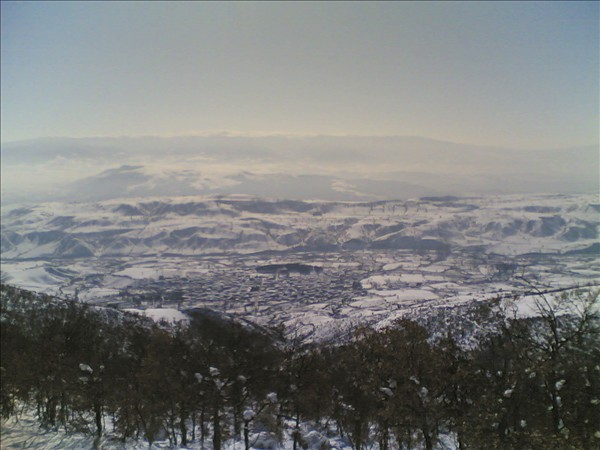

- Location within Turkey
- Coordinates: 40.8072°N 36.3422°E
- Country: Turkey
- Province: Amasya
- District: Taşova
- Population (2021): 1,122
- Time zone: UTC+3 (TRT)

Alpaslan is a village in the Taşova District, Amasya Province, Turkey. Its population is 1,122 (2021). Before the 2013 reorganisation, it was a town (belde).
