= Mercimekköy, Taşova =

Mercimekköy
- Village
- Location within Turkey
- Country: Turkey
- Province: Amasya
- District: Taşova
- Population (2021): 394
- Time zone: UTC+3 (TRT)

Mercimekköy is a village in the Taşova District, Amasya Province, Turkey. Its population is 394 (2021).
