= Şeyhli, Taşova =

Şeyhli
- Village
- Location in Turkey
- Coordinates: 40.9299°N 36.2675°E
- Country: Turkey
- Province: Amasya
- District: Taşova
- Population (2021): 214
- Time zone: UTC+3 (TRT)

Şeyhli is a village in the Taşova District, Amasya Province, Turkey. Its population is 214 (2021).
