= Kumluca, Taşova =

Kumluca
- Village
- Location within Turkey
- Coordinates: 40.6800°N 36.3383°E
- Country: Turkey
- Province: Amasya
- District: Taşova
- Population (2021): 222
- Time zone: UTC+3 (TRT)

Kumluca is a village in the Taşova District, Amasya Province, Turkey. Its population is 222 (2021).
