= Ilıpınar, Taşova =

Ilıpınar
- Village
- Location within Turkey
- Country: Turkey
- Province: Amasya
- District: Taşova
- Population (2021): 42
- Time zone: UTC+3 (TRT)

Ilıpınar is a village in the Taşova District, Amasya Province, Turkey. Its population is 42 (2021).
