= Çalkaya, Taşova =

Çalkaya
- Village
- Location within Turkey
- Coordinates: 40.8342°N 36.3266°E
- Country: Turkey
- Province: Amasya
- District: Taşova
- Population (2021): 38
- Time zone: UTC+3 (TRT)

Çalkaya is a village in the Taşova District, Amasya Province, Turkey. Its population is 38 (2021).
