= Boraboy =

Settlement in Turkey

- Village
- Location in Turkey
- Coordinates: 40°48′N 36°11′E
- Country: Turkey
- Province: Amasya
- District: Taşova
- Elevation: 1,050 m (3,440 ft)
- Population (2021): 732
- Time zone: UTC+3 (TRT)
- Postal code: 05876
- Area code: 0358

Boraboy is a village in the Taşova District, Amasya Province, Turkey. Its population was 732 in 2021. Before the 2013 reorganisation, it was a town (belde).

== Geography ==
Boraboy is a mountain town 17 kilometres (11 mi) from Taşova with a lake, Lake Boraboy. The settled population was 819 as of 2013.

== History and etymology ==
According to the town page, the origin of the name Boraboy may either be a certain Bora Bey, a leader of a Turkmen tribe, or the Greek wind god Boreas. The settlement was declared a seat of township in 1971. Between 1964 and 1994 the town was also called Gölbeyli ("lake lord").

== Economy ==
Product range in agriculture is quite wide, the most important products being apple, pear and sugar cane. Trout farming and beekeeping as well as flour production are among the secondary activities.
