= Alçakbel, Taşova =

Alçakbel
- Village
- Location within Turkey
- Coordinates: 40.9596°N 36.3027°E
- Country: Turkey
- Province: Amasya
- District: Taşova
- Population (2021): 241
- Time zone: UTC+3 (TRT)

Alçakbel is a village in the Taşova District, Amasya Province, Turkey. Its population is 241 (2021).
