= Elmakırı, Taşova =

Village in Amasya province of Turkey

Elmakırı
- Village
- Location within Turkey
- Coordinates: 40°42′N 36°11′E
- Country: Turkey
- Province: Amasya
- District: Taşova
- Population (2021): 205
- Time zone: UTC+3 (TRT)

Elmakırı is a village in the Taşova District, Amasya Province, Turkey. Its population is 205 (2021).

In records from 1928, the village was also known as Kirampa or Kirempe.
