= Dereköy, Taşova =

Dereköy
- Village
- Location within Turkey
- Coordinates: 40.7681°N 36.3714°E
- Country: Turkey
- Province: Amasya
- District: Taşova
- Population (2021): 161
- Time zone: UTC+3 (TRT)

Dereköy is a village in the Taşova District, Amasya Province, Turkey. Its population is 161 (2021).
