= Kırkharman, Taşova =

Kırkharman
- Village
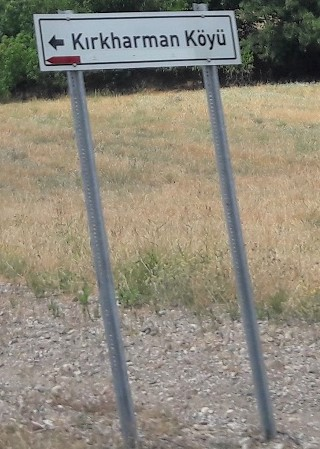

- Location within Turkey
- Coordinates: 40.7806°N 36.1917°E
- Country: Turkey
- Province: Amasya
- District: Taşova
- Population (2021): 202
- Time zone: UTC+3 (TRT)

Kırkharman is a village in the Taşova District, Amasya Province, Turkey. Its population is 202 (2021). The village had a small Pontic Greek population before the population exchange between Greece and Turkey. Their church, built in the 19th century, still stands there.

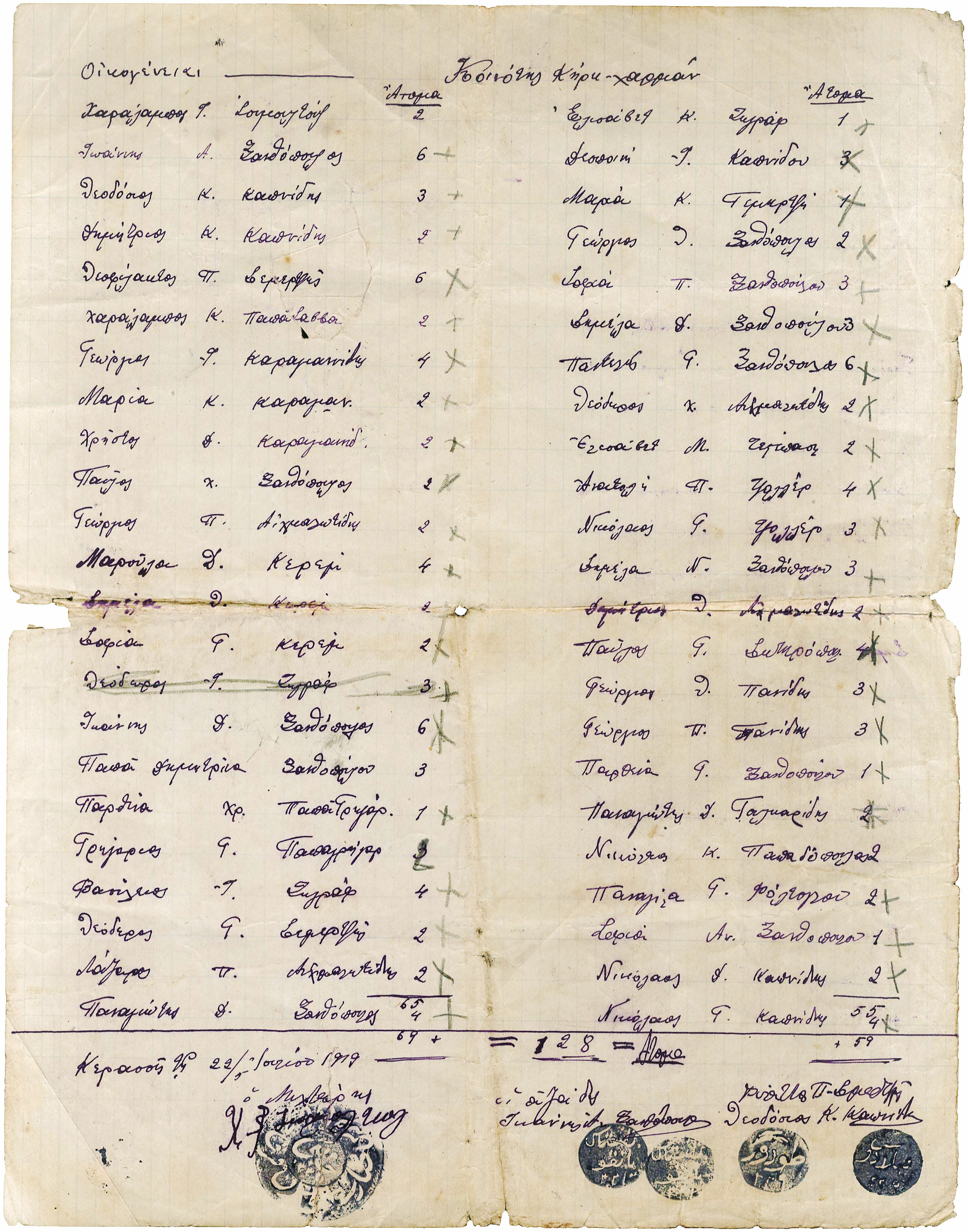
List of 45 Pontic Greek families that lived in Kırkharman in 1919, before the population exchange
