= Gökpınar, Taşova =

Gökpınar
- Village
- Location within Turkey
- Coordinates: 40.8580°N 36.3760°E
- Country: Turkey
- Province: Amasya
- District: Taşova
- Population (2021): 44
- Time zone: UTC+3 (TRT)

Gökpınar is a village in the Taşova District, Amasya Province, Turkey. Its population is 44 (2021).
