= Ilıcaköy, Taşova =

Ilıcaköy
- Village
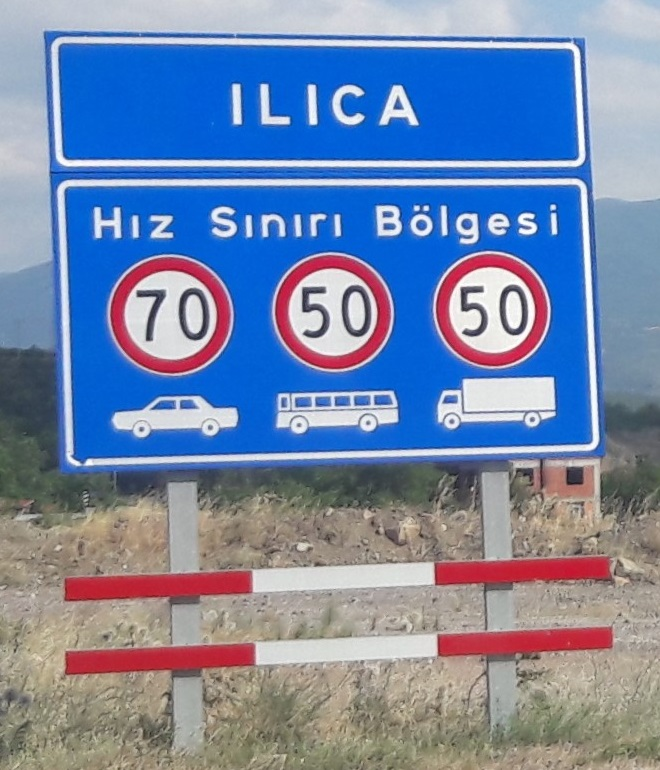

- Location within Turkey
- Country: Turkey
- Province: Amasya
- District: Taşova
- Population (2021): 171
- Time zone: UTC+3 (TRT)

Ilıcaköy (also: Ilıca) is a village in the Taşova District, Amasya Province, Turkey. Its population is 171 (2021).
