= Özbaraklı, Taşova =

Özbaraklı
- Village
- Location within Turkey
- Coordinates: 40°43′N 36°07′E
- Country: Turkey
- Province: Amasya
- District: Taşova
- Population (2021): 445
- Time zone: UTC+3 (TRT)

Özbaraklı is a village in the Taşova District, Amasya Province, Turkey. Its population is 445 (2021). Before the 2013 reorganisation, it was a town (belde).
