= Gemibükü, Taşova =

Gemibükü
- Village
- Location within Turkey
- Coordinates: 40°45′N 36°24′E
- Country: Turkey
- Province: Amasya
- District: Taşova
- Population (2021): 242
- Time zone: UTC+3 (TRT)

Gemibükü is a village in the Taşova District, Amasya Province, Turkey. Its population is 242 (2021).
