= Kızgüldüren, Taşova =

Kızgüldüren
- Village
- Location within Turkey
- Coordinates: 40°43′N 36°20′E
- Country: Turkey
- Province: Amasya
- District: Taşova
- Population (2021): 248
- Time zone: UTC+3 (TRT)

Kızgüldüren is a village in the Taşova District, Amasya Province, Turkey. Its population is 248 (2021).
