= Yaylasaray, Taşova =

Yaylasaray
- Village
- Location within Turkey
- Coordinates: 40°41′N 36°09′E
- Country: Turkey
- Province: Amasya
- District: Taşova
- Population (2021): 587
- Time zone: UTC+3 (TRT)

Yaylasaray is a village in the Taşova District, Amasya Province, Turkey. Its population is 587 (2021).
