= Güngörmüş, Taşova =

Güngörmüş
- Village
- Location within Turkey
- Coordinates: 40.7302°N 36.2841°E
- Country: Turkey
- Province: Amasya
- District: Taşova
- Population (2021): 116
- Time zone: UTC+3 (TRT)

Güngörmüş is a village in the Taşova District, Amasya Province, Turkey. Its population is 116 (2021).
