= Yeşiltepe, Taşova =

Yeşiltepe
- Village
- Location within Turkey
- Coordinates: 40.9284°N 36.3385°E
- Country: Turkey
- Province: Amasya
- District: Taşova
- Population (2021): 109
- Time zone: UTC+3 (TRT)

Yeşiltepe is a village in the Taşova District, Amasya Province, Turkey. Its population is 109 (2021).
