= Karsavul, Taşova =

Karsavul
- Village
- Location within Turkey
- Coordinates: 40°50′N 36°22′E
- Country: Turkey
- Province: Amasya
- District: Taşova
- Population (2021): 121
- Time zone: UTC+3 (TRT)

Karsavul is a village in the Taşova District, Amasya Province, Turkey. Its population is 121 (2021).
