= Yeşilyurt, Taşova =

Yeşilyurt
- Village
- Location within Turkey
- Coordinates: 40.8201°N 36.2476°E
- Country: Turkey
- Province: Amasya
- District: Taşova
- Population (2021): 224
- Time zone: UTC+3 (TRT)

Yeşilyurt is a village in the Taşova District, Amasya Province, Turkey. Its population is 224 (2021).
