= Kavaloluğu, Taşova =

Kavaloluğu
- Village
- Location within Turkey
- Country: Turkey
- Province: Amasya
- District: Taşova
- Population (2021): 274
- Time zone: UTC+3 (TRT)

Kavaloluğu is a village in the Taşova District, Amasya Province, Turkey. Its population is 274 (2021).
