= Altınlı, Taşova =

Altınlı
- Village
- Location within Turkey
- Coordinates: 40.6637°N 36.2006°E
- Country: Turkey
- Province: Amasya
- District: Taşova
- Population (2021): 76
- Time zone: UTC+3 (TRT)

Altınlı is a village in the Taşova District, Amasya Province, Turkey. Its population is 76 (2021).
