= Devre, Taşova =

Devre
- Village
- Location within Turkey
- Coordinates: 40°42′N 36°19′E
- Country: Turkey
- Province: Amasya
- District: Taşova
- Population (2021): 181
- Time zone: UTC+3 (TRT)

Devre is a village in the Taşova District, Amasya Province, Turkey. Its population is 181 (2021).
