= Sofualan, Taşova =

Sofualan
- Village
- Location within Turkey
- Coordinates: 40°54′N 36°23′E
- Country: Turkey
- Province: Amasya
- District: Taşova
- Population (2021): 150
- Time zone: UTC+3 (TRT)

Sofualan is a village in the Taşova District, Amasya Province, Turkey. Its population is 150 (2021).
