= Karlık, Taşova =

Karlık
- Village
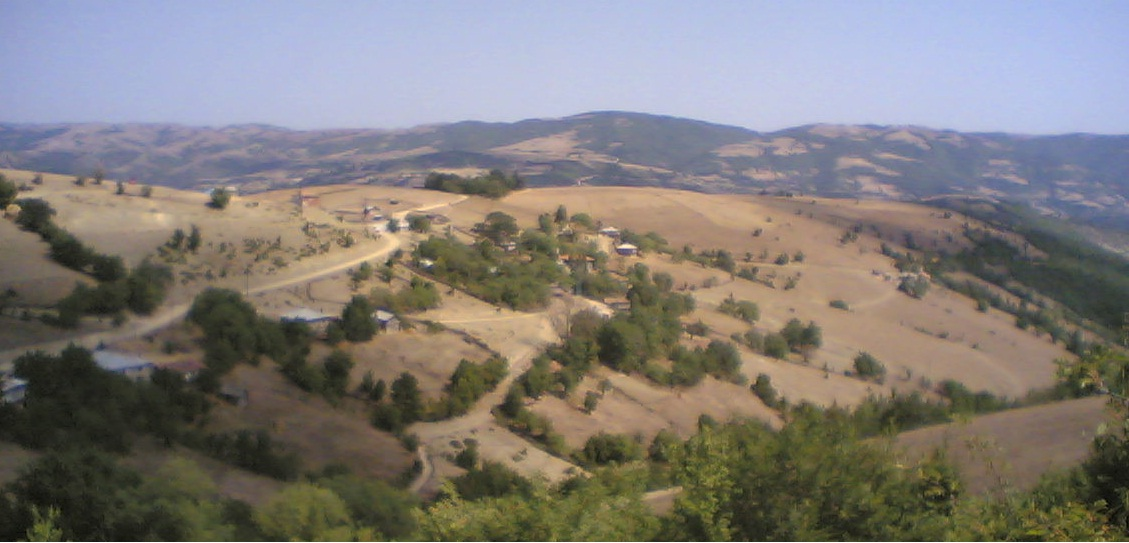

- Location within Turkey
- Coordinates: 40°52′59″N 36°18′25″E
- Country: Turkey
- Province: Amasya
- District: Taşova
- Population (2021): 152
- Time zone: UTC+3 (TRT)

Karlık is a village in the Taşova District, Amasya Province, Turkey. Its population is 152 (2021).
