= Terme River =

River in northern Turkey

Coordinates: 41°12′N 37°02′E

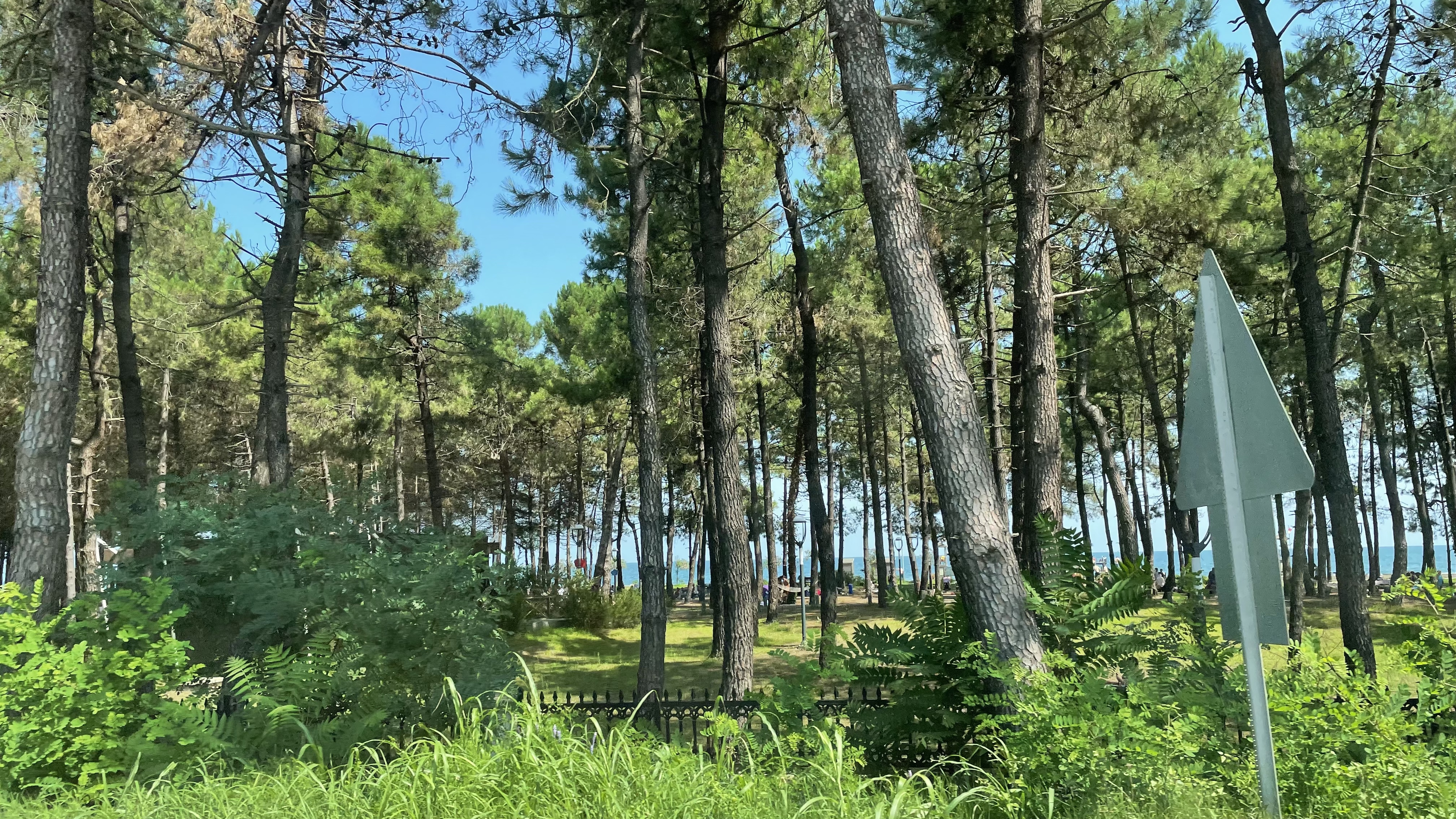
View of the Black Sea from Themiscyra in Turkey

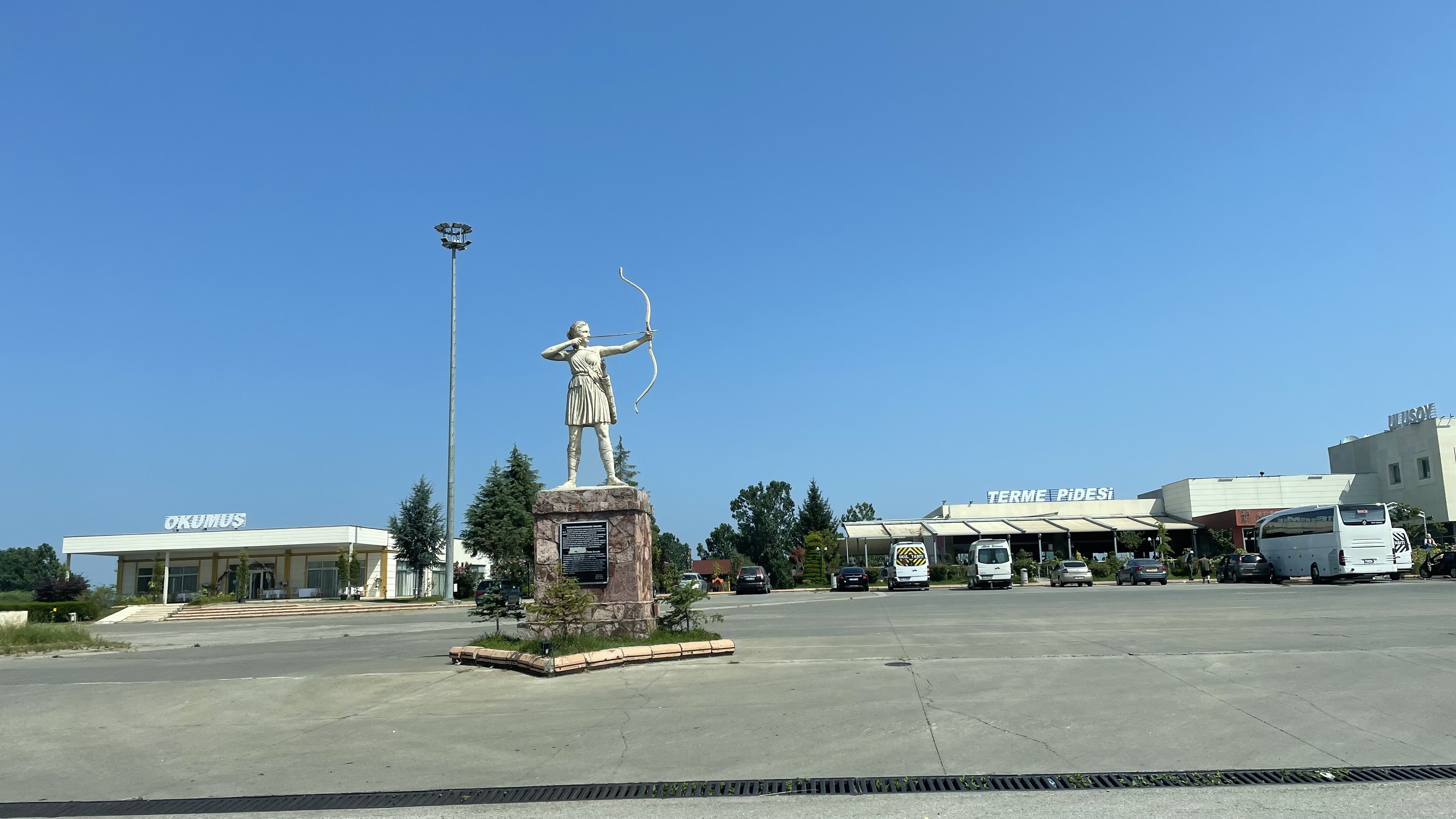
An amazon fighter statue in Terme of Samsun province in Turkey. In Greek mythology, the Thermodon was the location of the plain and capital, Themiscyra, where the Amazons dwelt.

The Terme River (Turkish: Terme Çayı; Latin: Thermeh; Greek: Θερμώδων, rendered Thermodon) is a short river in Samsun Province, Turkey draining into the Black Sea. Its sources are in the Pontic Mountains. It runs through the fertile Çarşamba plain to Salıpazarı, where it splits into three tributaries. The city of Terme is on the river, about 5 km from its mouth.

The ancient name of the river is the Thermodon, and the surrounding region was the Pontus. In antiquity, its mouth was about "three plethra" wide (ca. 300 feet), and it was navigable. The river, said by Strabo to have "its many sources near Phanaroea... [in] many streams" (which is not true; perhaps he was thinking of the Iris), was "very often noticed by ancient writers", and its mouth was near the town of Themiscyra. Starting with Dionysius Periegetes, in his Periegesis of the World, the Thermodon is often confused with the Iris River (modern Yeşilırmak), which is much larger, flows through Phanaroea, and carries much more sediment.

In Greek mythology, the Thermodon was the location of the plain and capital, Themiscyra, where the Amazons dwelt.

== See also ==
- Themiscyra Plain
