= Gürsu, Taşova =

Gürsu
- Village
- Location within Turkey
- Coordinates: 40.8259°N 36.3058°E
- Country: Turkey
- Province: Amasya
- District: Taşova
- Population (2021): 324
- Time zone: UTC+3 (TRT)

Gürsu is a village in the Taşova District, Amasya Province, Turkey. Its population is 324 (2021).
