= Yayladibi, Taşova =

Yayladibi
- Village
- Location within Turkey
- Coordinates: 40°51′N 36°12′E
- Country: Turkey
- Province: Amasya
- District: Taşova
- Population (2021): 201
- Time zone: UTC+3 (TRT)

Yayladibi is a village in the Taşova District, Amasya Province, Turkey. Its population is 201 (2021).
