= Çılkıdır, Taşova =

Çılkıdır
- Village
- Location within Turkey
- Coordinates: 40°45′N 36°22′E
- Country: Turkey
- Province: Amasya
- District: Taşova
- Population (2021): 122
- Time zone: UTC+3 (TRT)

Çılkıdır is a village in the Taşova District, Amasya Province, Turkey. Its population is 122 (2021).
