= Sepetli, Taşova =

Sepetli
- Village
- Location within Turkey
- Coordinates: 40.8325°N 36.2614°E
- Country: Turkey
- Province: Amasya
- District: Taşova
- Population (2021): 546
- Time zone: UTC+3 (TRT)

Sepetli is a village in the Taşova District, Amasya Province, Turkey. Its population is 546 (2021).
