= Durucasu, Taşova =

Durucasu
- Village
- Location within Turkey
- Coordinates: 40.7541°N 36.1180°E
- Country: Turkey
- Province: Amasya
- District: Taşova
- Population (2021): 193
- Time zone: UTC+3 (TRT)

Durucasu is a village in the Taşova District, Amasya Province, Turkey. Its population is 193 (2021).
