= Arpaderesi, Taşova =

Arpaderesi
- Village
- Location within Turkey
- Coordinates: 40.8201°N 36.2882°E
- Country: Turkey
- Province: Amasya
- District: Taşova
- Population (2021): 199
- Time zone: UTC+3 (TRT)

Arpaderesi is a village in the Taşova District, Amasya Province, Turkey. Its population is 199 (2021).
