= Mülkbükü, Taşova =

Mülkbükü
- Village
- Location within Turkey
- Coordinates: 40°45′N 36°25′E
- Country: Turkey
- Province: Amasya
- District: Taşova
- Population (2021): 298
- Time zone: UTC+3 (TRT)

Mülkbükü is a village in the Taşova District, Amasya Province, Turkey. Its population is 298 (2021).
