= Yenidere, Taşova =

Yenidere
- Village
- Location within Turkey
- Coordinates: 40°44′N 36°08′E
- Country: Turkey
- Province: Amasya
- District: Taşova
- Population (2021): 131
- Time zone: UTC+3 (TRT)

Yenidere is a village in the Taşova District, Amasya Province, Turkey. Its population is 131 (2021).
