= Yolaçan, Taşova =

Yolaçan
- Village
- Location within Turkey
- Coordinates: 40.7362°N 36.3549°E
- Country: Turkey
- Province: Amasya
- District: Taşova
- Population (2021): 103
- Time zone: UTC+3 (TRT)

Yolaçan is a village in the Taşova District, Amasya Province, Turkey. Its population is 103 (2021).
