= Dörtyol, Taşova =

Dörtyol
- Village
- Location within Turkey
- Coordinates: 40.7327°N 36.2296°E
- Country: Turkey
- Province: Amasya
- District: Taşova
- Population (2021): 307
- Time zone: UTC+3 (TRT)

Dörtyol is a village in the Taşova District, Amasya Province, Turkey. Its population is 307 (2021).
