= Korubaşı, Taşova =

Korubaşı
- Village
- Location within Turkey
- Coordinates: 40.9468°N 36.2024°E
- Country: Turkey
- Province: Amasya
- District: Taşova
- Population (2021): 126
- Time zone: UTC+3 (TRT)

Korubaşı is a village in the Taşova District, Amasya Province, Turkey. Its population is 126 (2021).
