= Andıran =

- Village
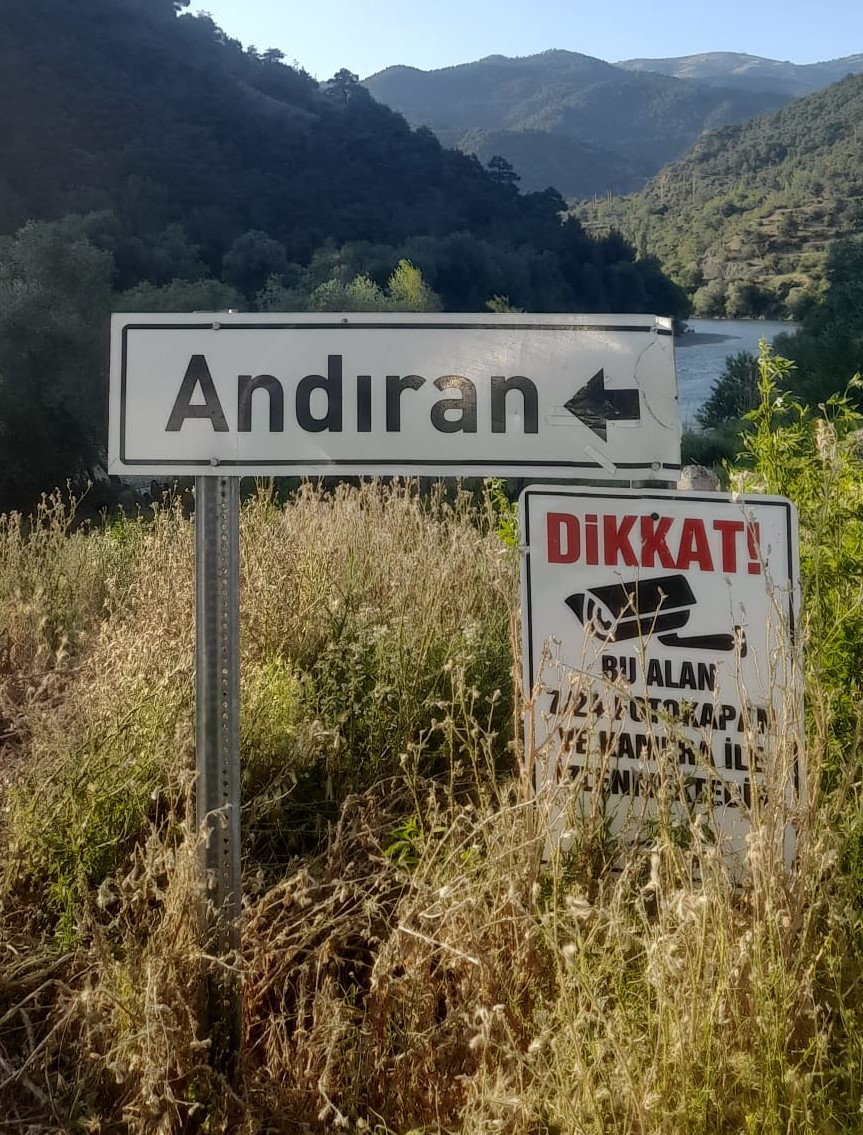

- Location within Turkey
- Coordinates: 40°46′16″N 36°28′02″E
- Country: Turkey
- Province: Amasya
- District: Taşova
- Population (2021): 251
- Time zone: UTC+3 (TRT)

Andıran (formerly: Umutlu) is a village in the Taşova District, Amasya Province, Turkey. Its population is 251 (2021).
