= Şahinler, Taşova =

Şahinler
- Village
- Location within Turkey
- Coordinates: 40.6893°N 36.3890°E
- Country: Turkey
- Province: Amasya
- District: Taşova
- Population (2021): 465
- Time zone: UTC+3 (TRT)

Şahinler is a village in the Taşova District, Amasya Province, Turkey. Its population is 465 (2021).
