= Türkmendamı, Taşova =

Türkmendamı
- Village
- Location within Turkey
- Coordinates: 40°45′N 36°14′E
- Country: Turkey
- Province: Amasya
- District: Taşova
- Population (2021): 132
- Time zone: UTC+3 (TRT)

Türkmendamı is a village in the Taşova District, Amasya Province, Turkey. Its population is 132 (2021).
