= Karabük, Taşova =

Karabük
- Village
- Location within Turkey
- Coordinates: 40.7376°N 36.1782°E
- Country: Turkey
- Province: Amasya
- District: Taşova
- Population (2021): 231
- Time zone: UTC+3 (TRT)

Karabük is a village in the Taşova District, Amasya Province, Turkey. Its population is 231 (2021).
