= Tatlıpınar, Taşova =

Tatlıpınar
- Village
- Location within Turkey
- Coordinates: 40.6669°N 36.2811°E
- Country: Turkey
- Province: Amasya
- District: Taşova
- Population (2021): 127
- Time zone: UTC+3 (TRT)

Tatlıpınar is a village in the Taşova District, Amasya Province, Turkey. Its population is 127 (2021).
