= Dutluk, Taşova =

Dutluk
- Village
- Location within Turkey
- Coordinates: 40°44′23″N 36°16′57″E
- Country: Turkey
- Province: Amasya
- District: Taşova
- Population (2021): 119
- Time zone: UTC+3 (TRT)

Dutluk is a village in the Taşova District, Amasya Province, Turkey. Its population is 119 (2021). It is situated approximately 45 kilometers from the Amasya city center and about 4 kilometers from the center of Taşova. The population of Dutluk has seen some fluctuations over the years. For instance, in 2010, the population was recorded at 137, but it has generally been in decline since then.
