= Çakırsu, Taşova =

Çakırsu
- Village
- Location within Turkey
- Coordinates: 40.6735°N 36.3057°E
- Country: Turkey
- Province: Amasya
- District: Taşova
- Population (2021): 275
- Time zone: UTC+3 (TRT)

Çakırsu is a village in the Taşova District, Amasya Province, Turkey. Its population is 275 (2021).
