= Kozluca, Taşova =

Kozluca
- Village
- Location within Turkey
- Coordinates: 40.8426°N 36.1629°E
- Country: Turkey
- Province: Amasya
- District: Taşova
- Population (2021): 163
- Time zone: UTC+3 (TRT)

Kozluca is a village in the Taşova District, Amasya Province, Turkey. Its population is 163 (2021).
