= Ardıçönü, Taşova =

Ardıçönü
- Village
- Location within Turkey
- Coordinates: 40°40′N 36°21′E
- Country: Turkey
- Province: Amasya
- District: Taşova
- Population (2021): 58
- Time zone: UTC+3 (TRT)

Ardıçönü is a village in the Taşova District, Amasya Province, Turkey. Its population is 58 (2021).
