= Hüsnüoğlu, Taşova =

Hüsnüoğlu
- Village
- Location within Turkey
- Coordinates: 40°40′N 36°19′E
- Country: Turkey
- Province: Amasya
- District: Taşova
- Population (2021): 124
- Time zone: UTC+3 (TRT)

Hüsnüoğlu is a village in the Taşova District, Amasya Province, Turkey. Its population is 124 (2021).
