= Taşova =

- Municipality
- Location within Turkey
- Coordinates: 40°45′N 36°19′E
- Country: Turkey
- Province: Amasya
- District: Taşova

Government
  - Mayor: Ömer Özalp (CHP)
- Elevation: 230 m (750 ft)
- Population (2021): 11,248
- Time zone: UTC+3 (TRT)
- Website: tasova.bel.tr

Taşova is a town in Amasya Province of the central Black Sea region of Turkey. It is the seat of Taşova District. Its population is 11,248 (2021). The altitude of the town is 230 meters. The mayor is Ömer Özalp (CHP).

Taşova stands on a green and fertile plain, on the banks of the River Yeşilırmak.

== Climate ==
Taşova has a hot-summer Mediterranean climate (Köppen: Csa).

Climate data for Taşova
Month	Jan	Feb	Mar	Apr	May	Jun	Jul	Aug	Sep	Oct	Nov	Dec	Year
Daily mean °C (°F)	4.5 (40.1)	5.8 (42.4)	8.3 (46.9)	12.5 (54.5)	16.4 (61.5)	19.9 (67.8)	22.5 (72.5)	22.5 (72.5)	19.5 (67.1)	15.0 (59.0)	10.6 (51.1)	6.7 (44.1)	13.7 (56.7)
Average precipitation mm (inches)	61 (2.4)	47 (1.9)	51 (2.0)	57 (2.2)	47 (1.9)	38 (1.5)	22 (0.9)	17 (0.7)	30 (1.2)	53 (2.1)	59 (2.3)	67 (2.6)	549 (21.7)
Source: Climate-Data.org

== History ==
The first of many cultures and civilisations to settle on the plain were the Hittites who by 1650 BC were spread throughout Anatolia. Then came the Phrygians (1200 - 700 BC), Cimmerians, Medes and Persians.

The Ancient Macedonians of Alexander the Great came to Anatolia in 331 BC and upon their dispersal rule of the Amasya region including Taşova passed to the Kings of Pontus (in 291 BC), who remained in control until the arrival of the Romans. The plain was part of the Roman Empire until 395 AD and for centuries more belonged to Byzantium. The Arab armies of early Islam came through in 712.

Following the victory of the Seljuk Turks over Byzantium at Malazgirt in 1071, Turkish peoples spread into Anatolia taking the Byzantine cities one by one. The plain of Taşova was conquered by Danishmend lords in 1075, who were based in nearby Amasya. The area was taken over by the Seljuk lord Kılıçarslan II in 1174, and following much more invasion and warfare was finally brought within the Ottoman Empire in 1425.

Under the Ottomans the plain Taşova remained a rural village with a Turkish population. The village was attacked by Greek bandits at the beginning of the Turkish War of Independence but these were pushed out of the area by the newly formed Turkish army.

== Economy ==
The local economy depends on agriculture and has suffered recently from the closure of the tobacco factory.

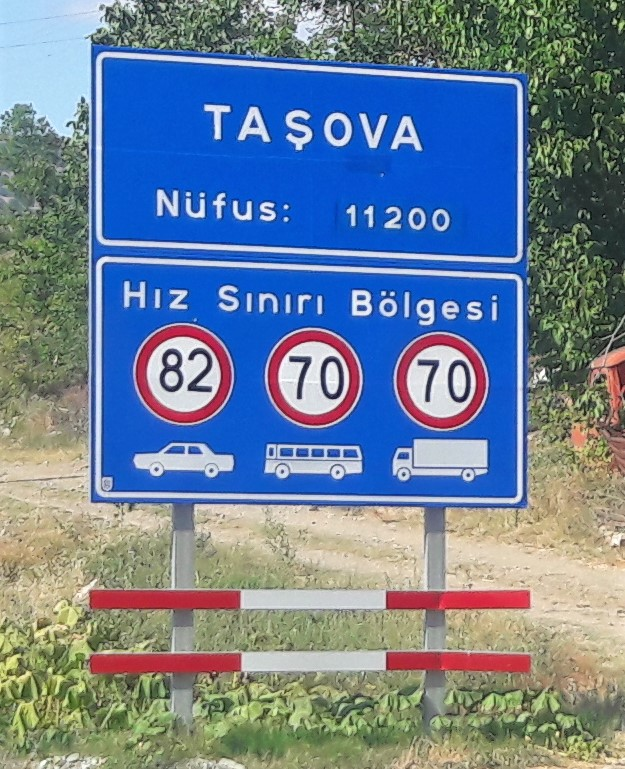
A road sign in Taşova
