= Taşova District =

District of Amasya Province, Turkey

- District
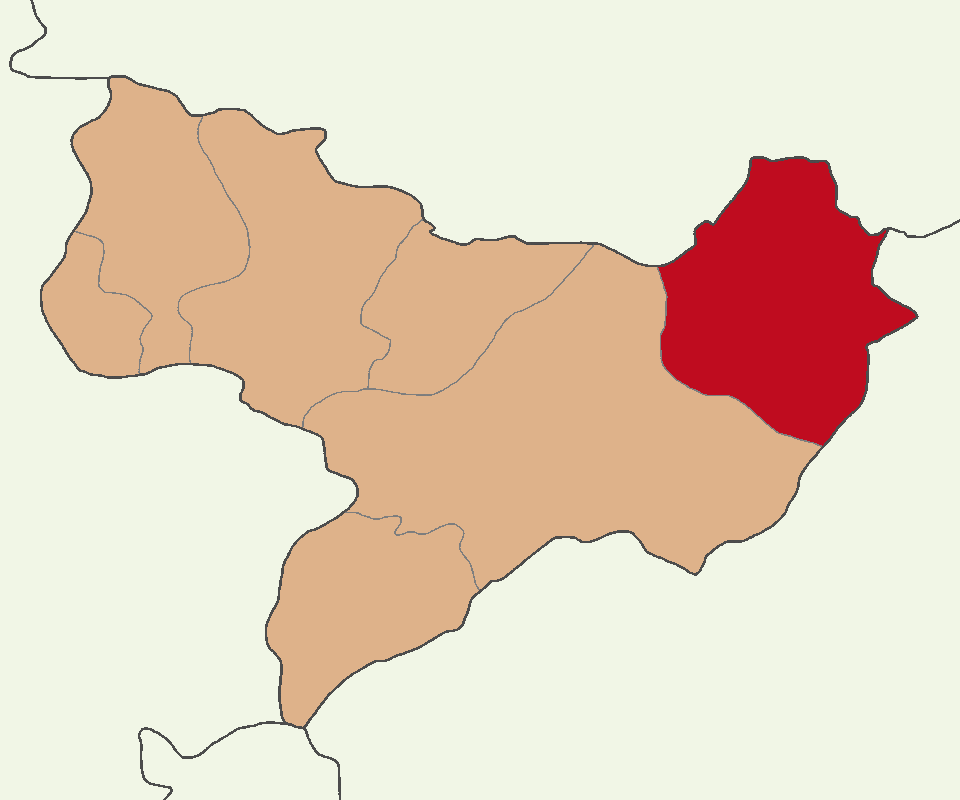
- Map showing Taşova District in Amasya Province

- Location in Turkey
- Coordinates: 40°45′N 36°19′E
- Country: Turkey
- Province: Amasya
- Seat: Taşova

Government
  - Kaymakam: Ahmet Gökcecik
- Area: 971 km^{2} (375 sq mi)
- Population (2021): 30,123
  - Density: 31/km^{2} (80/sq mi)
- Time zone: UTC+3 (TRT)
- Website: www.tasova.gov.tr

Taşova District is a district of Amasya Province of Turkey. Its seat is the town Taşova. Its area is 971 km^{2}, and its population is 30,123 (2021).

== Composition ==
There is one municipality in Taşova District:

- Taşova

There are 63 villages in Taşova District:

- Alçakbel
- Alpaslan
- Altınlı
- Andıran
- Ardıçönü
- Arpaderesi
- Ballıca
- Belevi
- Boraboy
- Çakırsu
- Çalkaya
- Çambükü
- Çaydibi
- Çılkıdır
- Dereköy
- Dereli
- Destek
- Devre
- Dörtyol
- Durucasu
- Dutluk
- Elmakırı
- Esençay
- Gemibükü
- Geydoğan
- Gökpınar
- Güngörmüş
- Gürsu
- Güvendik
- Hacıbeyköyü
- Hüsnüoğlu
- Ilıcaköy
- Ilıpınar
- Karabük
- Karamuk
- Karlık
- Karsavul
- Kavaloluğu
- Kırkharman
- Kızgüldüren
- Korubaşı
- Kozluca
- Kumluca
- Mercimekköy
- Mülkbükü
- Özbaraklı
- Şahinler
- Sepetli
- Şeyhli
- Sofualan
- Tatlıpınar
- Tekke
- Tekpınar
- Türkmendamı
- Uluköy
- Yayladibi
- Yaylasaray
- Yenidere
- Yerkozlu
- Yeşiltepe
- Yeşilyurt
- Yolaçan
- Yukarıbaraklı
