= Battle of the Lycus =

66 BCE battle of the Third Mithridatic War

- Part of the Third Mithridatic War
Date	66 BC
Location	Lycus River, Ionia (modern-day Kelkit River, Turkey)
Result	Roman victory; End of the Mithridatic Wars

Belligerents
Roman Republic	Pontic Empire

Commanders and leaders
Pompey the Great	Mithridates VI

Strength
c. 50,000	c. 30,000 infantry and 2,000–3,000 cavalry

Casualties and losses
Unknown	More than 10,000 killed and many prisoners

The Battle of the Lycus was fought in 66 BC between an army of Roman Republic under the command of Pompey the Great and the forces of Mithridates VI of Pontus. The Romans won the battle with few losses; their victory turned out to be decisive with Mithridates fleeing to the Kingdom of the Bosporus (north of the Black Sea) and committing suicide a few years later (in 63 BC), finally ending the Third Mithridatic War.

== Prelude ==
In 67 BC, after the Battle of Zela, king Mithridates VI of Pontus had regained control of the kingdom of Pontus. Whilst the Roman commanders were involved in internal politics, Mithridates had been building up his forces and preparing for the inevitable confrontation. Unfortunately for him that confrontation did not take long to materialize in the form of Pompey, Rome's foremost commander, and a very large Roman army. Pompey first established a blockade of the whole coastline of Asia Minor. Secondly he convinced the new Parthian king, Phraates III, to invade Armenia, Mithridates' main ally, forcing Tigranes II of Armenia to turn his attention to protecting his own empire. Thirdly he sent three legions to secure Cappadocia to the south of Pontus. Pompey then marched his numerically superior army into his enemy's heartland. Mithridates withdrew to the centre of his mountainous kingdom, drawing Pompey after him, denying him supplies by burning the crops, and harassing him with his own superior cavalry. Eventually Mithridates marched into the Lycus valley and encamped on a well-watered hill called Dasteira.

== Battle ==
Approaching Mithridates' camp an engagement broke out between Pompey's vanguard and Mithridates' rearguard in a defile. According to Appian some of the Pontic cavalrymen were fighting the Romans dismounted and making a good show of it until a large contingent of Roman-allied cavalry showed up. The cavalrymen ran back to the camp to get their horses but this caused a general retreat because their companions did not know why they were running away and they did not want to stay and find out. Pompey wanting to make use of this blow to his enemy's morale and fearing Mithridates would escape during the night decided to launch an assault of the Pontic camp during the night.

As the Romans attacked with the moon to their backs the Pontic troops launched their missiles too early. The Romans were able to get right up to and into the Pontic camp. Once the experienced Roman legionaries got among the Pontic troops the fight was as good as won (Roman legionaries excelled at close-range fighting). Mithridates had made his camp at a site that was difficult to get into. As his desperate troops now found out, it was also hard to get out of. Mithridates with 800 horsemen cut his way out of the trap and escaped but at least 10,000 of his men did not.

== Aftermath ==
With his army destroyed Mithridates at first intended to return to the sanctuary of Armenia, but the beleaguered Tigranes was having none of it. Suspecting Mithridates of plotting with one of his own sons (also called Tigranes), he put a huge 100-talent bounty on Mithridates' head. He might have also recognized the old king's cause as lost and did not want to go down with him. With Pompey to the west, Cappadocia to the south in Roman hands, the Black Sea closed off by a Roman blockade and Armenia unwelcoming, the only way out was the northern route to the Bosporan kingdom (including parts of the Crimea) ruled by his son Machares. After a difficult journey around the eastern half of the Black Sea, Mithridates arrived in the Bosporan Kingdom and made himself its king after murdering his son. Pompey, busy establishing Roman rule in the east, left him to his own devices. In 63 BC, while Mithridates was planning another campaign against Rome, his army rebelled and crowned Pharnaces, one of his many sons, king. Cornered, Mithridates tried to poison himself but this failed, and he was instead killed by his Gallic bodyguard.
