= Governor of Amasya =

Governor of a Turkish Province

Governor of Amasya Amasya Valiliği
- Logo of the Governor of Amasya
- Incumbent; Önder Bakan since September 25, 2024
- Appointer: President of Turkey; On the recommendation of the Turkish government
- Term length: No set term length or limit
- Inaugural holder: İsmail Hakkı Mumcu; 1923
- Website: Office of the Governor

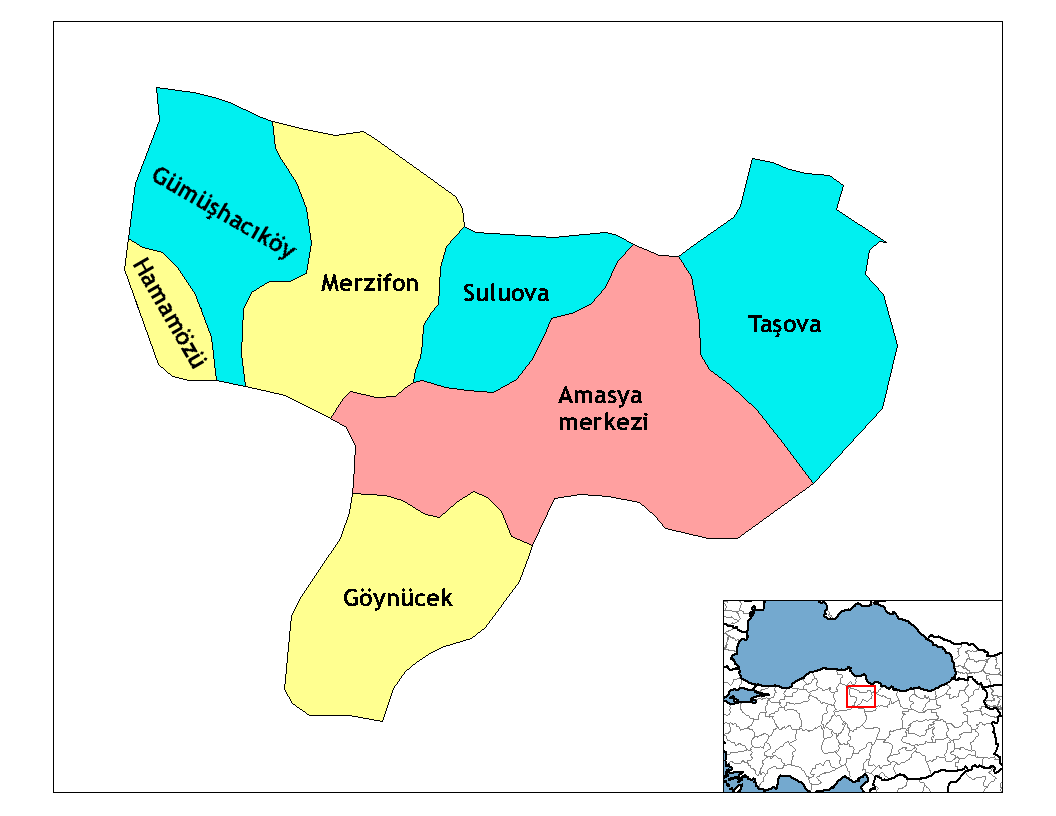
Map of the Province of Amasya, showing the provincial districts.

The Governor of Amasya (Turkish: Amasya Valiliği) is the bureaucratic state official responsible for both national government and state affairs in the Province of Amasya. Similar to the Governors of the 80 other Provinces of Turkey, the Governor of Amasya is appointed by the Government of Turkey and is responsible for the implementation of government legislation within Amasya. The Governor is also the most senior commander of both the Amasya provincial police force and the Amasya Gendarmerie.

== Appointment ==
The Governor of Amasya is appointed by the President of Turkey, who confirms the appointment after recommendation from the Turkish Government. The Ministry of the Interior first considers and puts forward possible candidates for approval by the cabinet. The Governor of Amasya is therefore not a directly elected position and instead functions as the most senior civil servant in the Province of Amasya.

=== Term limits ===
The Governor is not limited by any term limits and does not serve for a set length of time. Instead, the Governor serves at the pleasure of the Government, which can appoint or reposition the Governor whenever it sees fit. Such decisions are again made by the cabinet of Turkey. The Governor of Amasya, as a civil servant, may not have any close connections or prior experience in Amasya Province. It is not unusual for Governors to alternate between several different Provinces during their bureaucratic career.

== Functions ==
The Governor of Amasya has both bureaucratic functions and influence over local government. The main role of the Governor is to oversee the implementation of decisions by government ministries, constitutional requirements and legislation passed by Grand National Assembly within the provincial borders. The Governor also has the power to reassign, remove or appoint officials a certain number of public offices and has the right to alter the role of certain public institutions if they see fit. Governors are also the most senior public official within the Province, meaning that they preside over any public ceremonies or provincial celebrations being held due to a national holiday. As the commander of the provincial police and Gendarmerie forces, the Governor can also take decisions designed to limit civil disobedience and preserve public order. Although mayors of municipalities and councillors are elected during local elections, the Governor has the right to re-organise or to inspect the proceedings of local government despite being an unelected position.

== List of governors of Amasya ==
- İsmail Hakkı Mumcu (1923–1924)
- Ahmet Hilmi Ergeneli (1924–1927)
- Fahrettin Kiper (1927)
- Ahmet Faik Üstün (1928–1930)
- Mehmet Kadri Üçok (1930–1935)
- Talat Öncel (1935–1945)
- Saim Hazar (1945–1948)
- Akif İşcan (1948–1950)
- Esat Onat (1950–1954)
- Mazlum Yegül (1954–1956)
- Mehmet Varinli (1956–1960)
- İ. Hakkı Alpay (1960)
- Celil Yörükoğlu (1960–1961)
- Niyazi Akı (1961–1962)
- Fethi Tansuk (1962)
- Niyazi Dalokay (1962–1964)
- Kemalettin Gazezoğlu (1964–1966)
- Ertuğrul Süer (1966–1967)
- Mehmet Fahri Centel (1967–1970)
- Şevket Güreş (1970–1975)
- Mustafa Arıkan (1975–1977)
- Ali Çankaya (1977–1978)
- Aydemir Ceylan (1978–1979)
- Abidin Coşkun (1979–1980)
- Kamil Demircioğlu (1980–1982)
- Koru Engin (1982–1984)
- İ. Cahit Ertan (1984–1986)
- Sıtkı Aslan (1986–1992)
- T. Yüksel Ege (1992–1993)
- Hayrullah Yıldız (1993–1996)
- Kemal Nehrozoğlu (1996–1998)
- Hüseyin Poroy (1998–2004)
- Erhan Tanju (2004–2005)
- Mehmet Celalettin Lekesiz (2005–2009)
- Halil İbrahim Daşöz (2009–2011)
- Abdil Celil Öz (2011–2013)
- İbrahim Halil Çomaktekin (2013–2016)
- Salih Işık (2016–2017)
- Dr. Osman Varol (2017–2020)
- Mustafa Masatlı (2020–2023)
- Yılmaz Doruk (2023–2024)
- Önder Bakan (2024–)

== See also ==
- Governor (Turkey)
- Amasya Province
- Ministry of the Interior (Turkey)
