= Tekkeköy =

- District and municipality
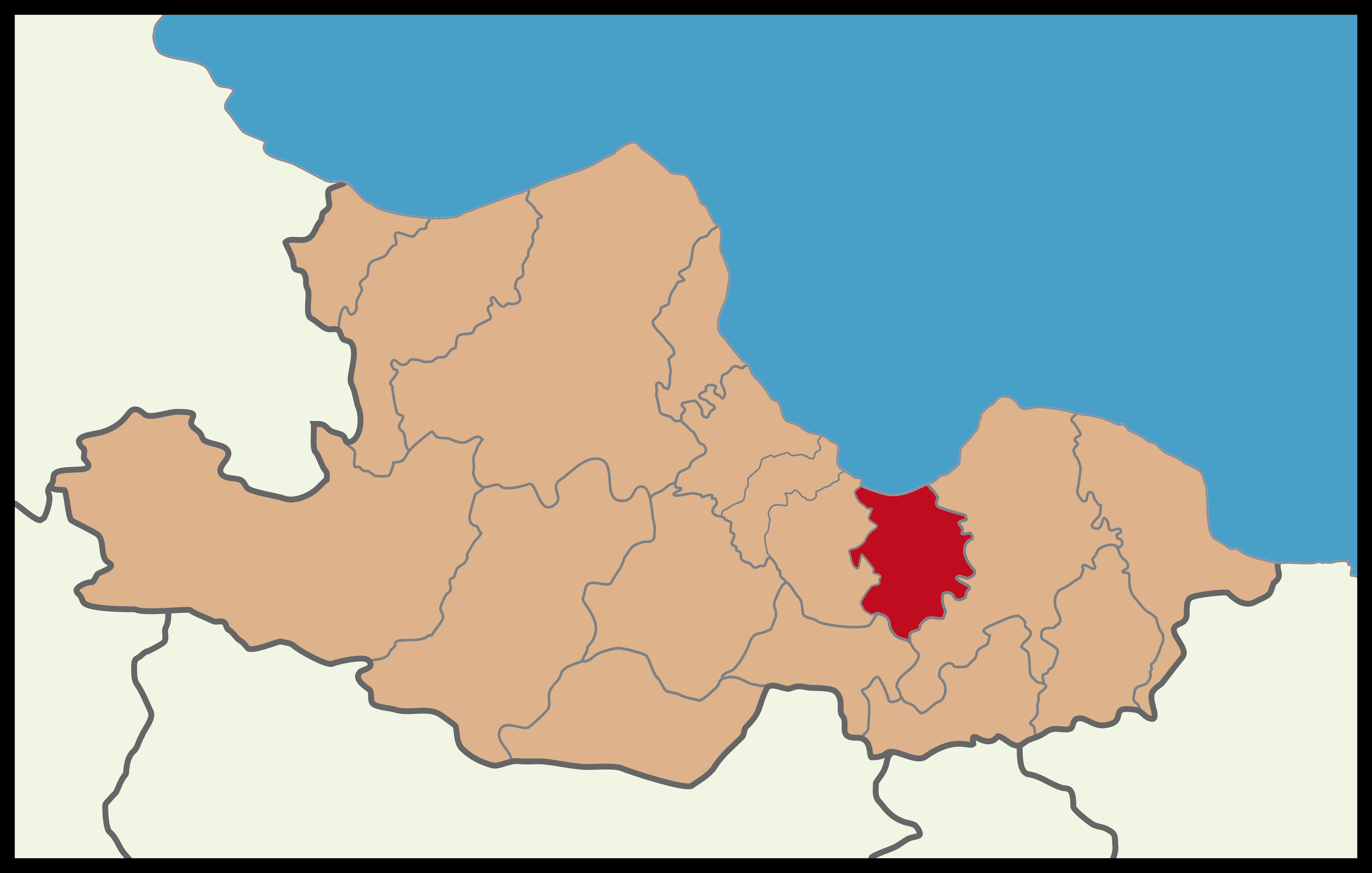
- Map showing Tekkeköy District in Samsun Province

- Location within Turkey
- Coordinates: 41°12′45″N 36°27′25″E
- Country: Turkey
- Province: Samsun

Government
  - Mayor: Hasan Togar (AKP)
- Area: 326 km^{2} (126 sq mi)
- Population (2022): 56,318
  - Density: 173/km^{2} (447/sq mi)
- Time zone: UTC+3 (TRT)
- Area code: 0362
- Climate: Cfa
- Website: tekkekoy.bel.tr

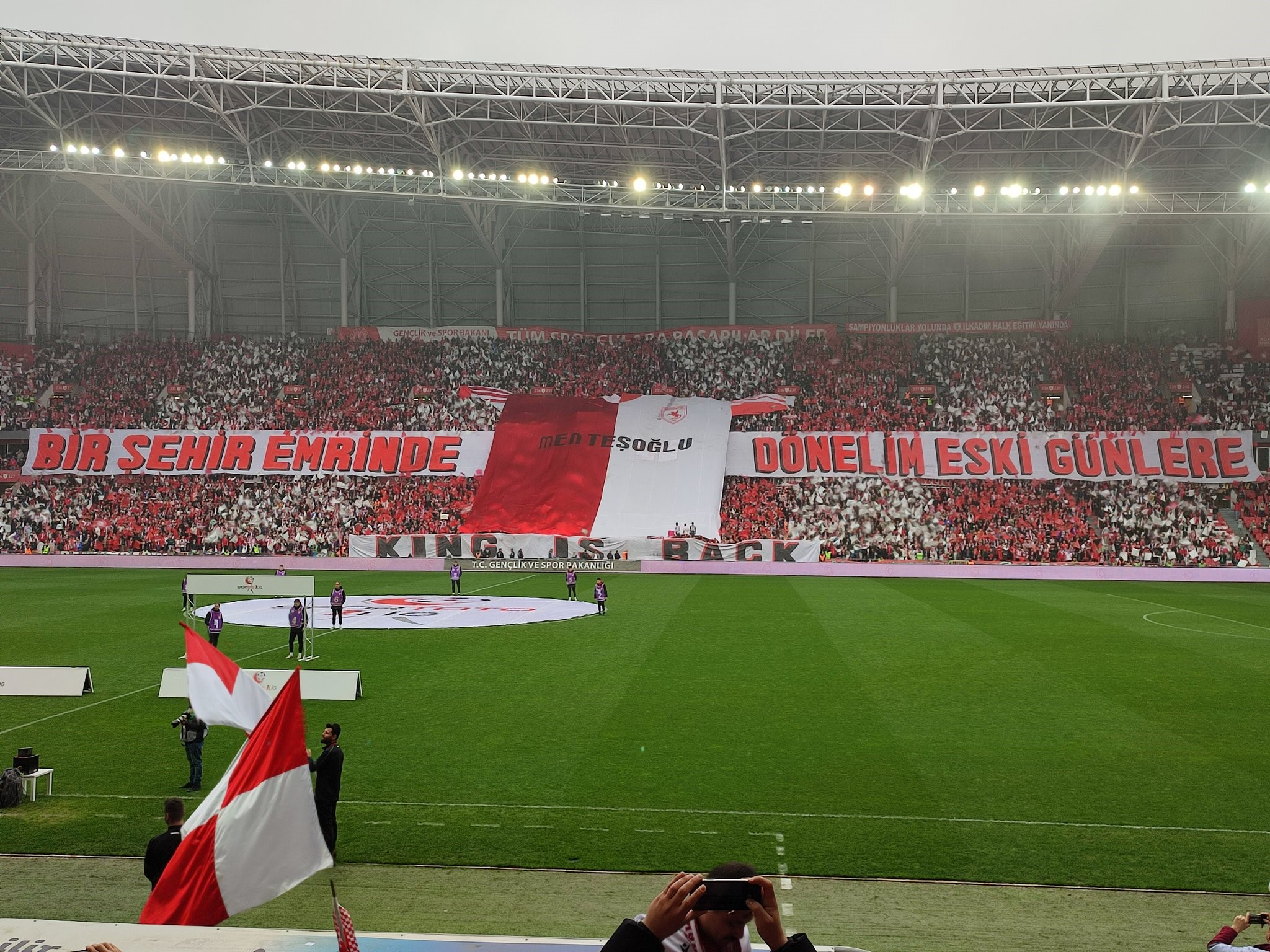
Samsunspor stadium

Tekkeköy is a municipality and district of Samsun Province, Turkey. Its area is 326 km^{2}, and its population is 56,318 (2022). It covers the easternmost part of the city of Samsun.

Agriculture and animal breeding are the main sources of income. Black Sea Copper Works Inc., Samsun fertilizer Factory, the Organized Industry Site, Industrial Site and Organized Food Industry Site, fertilizer and forging industry, along with a gas-fired power plant, many surgical instrument manufacturing companies and other manufacturers have facilitated an economically dynamic area.

Tekkeköy is on the coast of the Black Sea, on the western side of the Çarşamba Plain, and located on the 13th km of the Samsun–Trabzon highway. The Samsun tramway ends at Tekkeköy. A third of the district's land is within the delta of the Yeşilırmak, part of the Çarşamba Plain, which supports irrigation. The daily population is between 100–150k due to the industry sites and many big showrooms on the Samsun – Ordu highway.

The constructions of the Yaşar Doğu Arena and the new city stadium, the international expo and congress center being located within the district and projects such as the Logistics Village, Science and Technology Center, Arts & Culture Center, and Olympic Swimming Pool has served to modernize the district. There are also many hotels of international brands within Tekkeköy.

Samsun Çarşamba Airport is also within the district's limits. A 7,500-seat multi-purpose indoor venue, the Tekkeköy Yaşar Doğu Arena, was opened end March 2013 in the town.

Tekkeköy Municipality has been a member of the Union Of Historical Towns since 2015.

== History ==
In 1941, studies conducted in Tekkeköy and surrounding regions by archeologists Prof. Dr. Tahsin Özgüç and Prof. Nimet Özgüç, and led by Kılıç Kökten, have found that the district has been used as a settlement since the Paleolithic era. Located south of the current district center, these settlements date back to c. 600,000 – 100,000 BC.

Archeological studies done in the district have also revealed remains from the Hittite and Phrygian eras. These lands were included in the Pontus Empire in the mid 3rd century BC and later were seized by the Roman, the Byzantine and the Anatolian Seljuk empires respectively.

When the Seljuk Empire entered Anatolia, they sent the great Turkish Veli Sheikh Zeynuddin to this important area and established an Islamic lodge (tekke) in order to convert the locals to Islam. Sheikh Zeynuddin, who is thought to have lived from 1250 to 1330, cared for the travelers, the poor, and ones in need. It is said that the name Tekkeköy is rooted in that very lodge, as the literal translation for tekke is "holyman's lodge".

In 1399, the Ottomans gained reign over Tekkeköy but briefly lost the land to the Kubatoğulları clan in 1402 following the Battle of Ankara. However, the area became Ottoman territory once again in 1419 through Celebi Mehmet.

Turks and local Greeks (Rum) peacefully co-existed here during the Ottoman era until the Lausanne Treaty, which required the Turks in Western Thrace and Balkans (especially Thessaloniki, Greece and surrounding regions) to swap places with Greeks in the area. As a result, the inhabitants of Tekkeköy today fall into three main categories: Locals, immigrants from the west, and the exchange population who managed to preserve their cultural heritage.

Furthermore, the Arabian cemetery in Tekkeköy dated back to the 1800s is proof that other tribes were also here. Romanians also contribute to the rich culture embedded in Tekkeköy. These different and rich cultures have composed the cultural and folkloric significance of Tekkeköy.

== Composition ==
There are 63 neighbourhoods in Tekkeköy District:

- 19 Mayıs
- 23 Nisan
- Akbaşlar
- Altınkaya
- Antyeri
- Asarağaç
- Bakacak
- Balcalı
- Başköy
- Beyoğlu
- Büyüklü
- Çay
- Çayırçökek
- Çayleyik
- Çiftlik
- Çimenli
- Çınaralan
- Çinik
- Çırakman
- Cumhuriyet
- Erenköy
- Fındıcak
- Gökçe
- Gökçedere
- Gölceğiz
- Güzelyurt
- Hamzalı
- Hürriyet
- İstiklal
- Kababürük
- Kahyalı
- Karaoğlan
- Karaperçin
- Kargılı
- Karışlar
- Kerimbey
- Kerpiçli
- Kibarlar
- Kirazlık
- Kışla
- Köprübaşı
- Kurtuluş
- Kutlukent
- Ovabaşı
- Pınar
- Şabanoğlu
- Sanayi
- Sarıyurt
- Selyeri
- Seymenler
- Sıtmasuyu
- Yağbasan
- Yavuzlar
- Yaylageriş
- Yazılar
- Yeni Büyüklü
- Yenidoğan
- Yeniköy
- Yeşilalan
- Yeşildere
- Yeşilyurt
- Yukarıçinik
- Zafer
