= Macedonian Empire (disambiguation) =

Macedonian Empire most commonly refers to the empire of Alexander the Great.

It can also refer to:

- Macedon from 359 to 323 BC, under the reign of Philip II and Alexander the Great
  - Expansion of Macedonia under Philip II
  - Macedonian hegemony
- Antigonid Macedonia
- kingdoms of the Diadochi

== See also ==
- Seleucid Empire
- Ptolemaic Empire
- Hellenistic period
