= Themiscyra (Pontus) =

Ancient Greek city on the Black Sea

Coordinates: 41°12′33″N 36°58′26″E

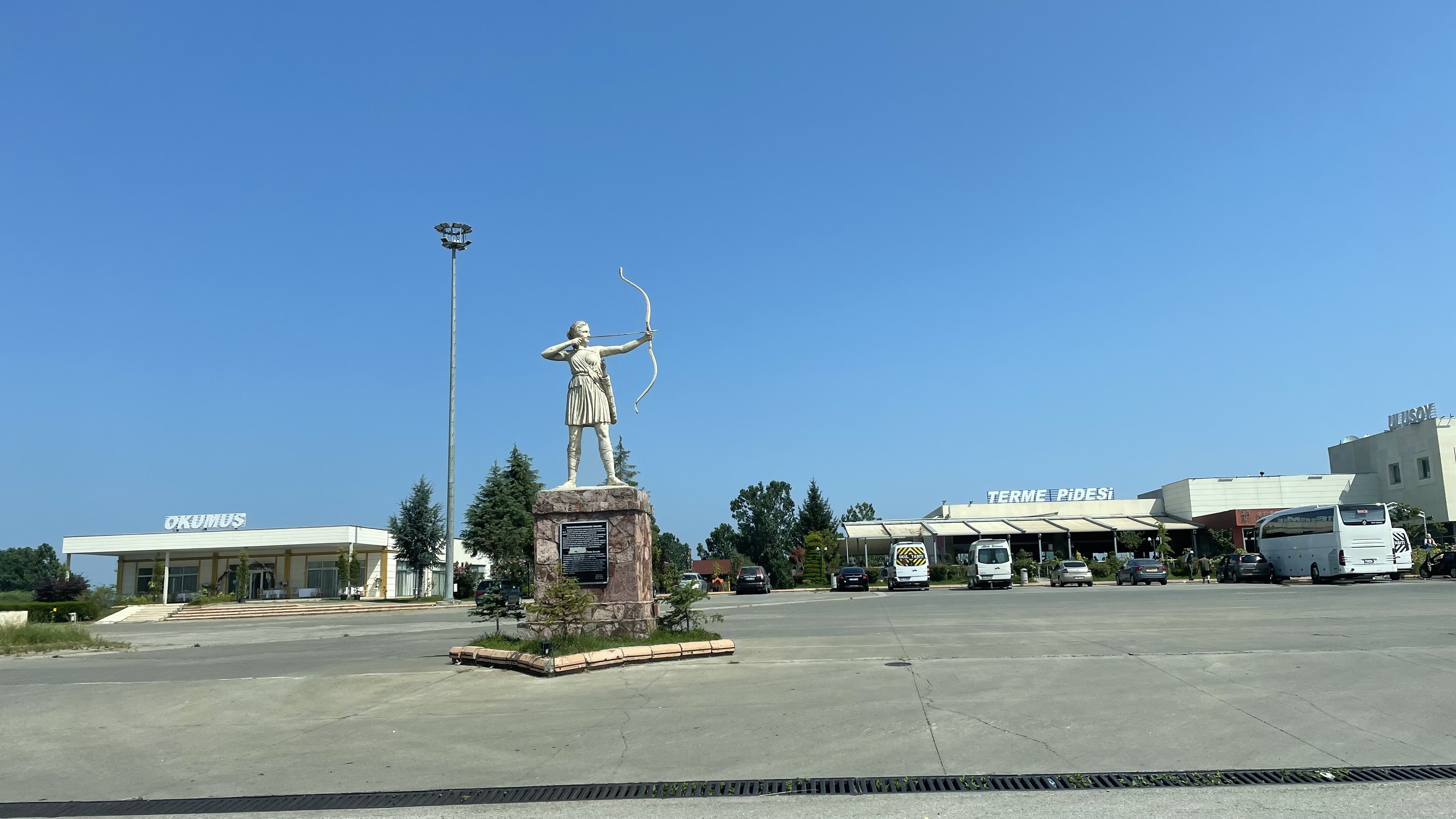
An amazon fighter statue in Terme of Samsun Province in Turkey

Themiscyra (/ˌθɛmɪˈskɪrə/; Ancient Greek: Θεμίσκυρα, romanized: Themiskyra) was an ancient Greek town in northeastern Anatolia; it was situated on the southern coast of the Black Sea, near the mouth of the Thermodon, probably at or near modern Terme.

According to Greek mythology, it was the capital city of the Amazons, a society of fierce, independent women known for their skill in combat and dedication to their way of life.

== Overview ==
The town is mentioned as early as the time of Herodotus (iv. 86; comp. Scylax of Caryanda, p. 33; Pausanias i. 2. § 1) who also mentions the Amazon female warriors from Themiscyra. Aeschylus, in his play Prometheus Bound, places the original home of the Amazons in the country about Lake Maeotis (the modern-day Sea of Azov), stating that they later moved to Themiscyra. In addition, Strabo, in his Geographica, mentions that Themiscyra was home to both the Amazons and the Gargareans before they split up and they went to live separately in the north, at the foot of the Caucasus Mountains.

Ptolemy (v. 6 § 3) is undoubtedly mistaken in placing it further west, midway between the Iris (Yeşilırmak) and Cape Heraclium. Scylax calls it a Greek town; but Diodorus Siculus (ii. 44) states that it was built by the founder of the kingdom of the Amazons. After the retreat of Mithridates VI from Cyzicus during the Third Mithridatic War, Themiscyra was besieged by Lucullus. The inhabitants on that occasion defended themselves with great valor; and when their walls were undermined, they sent bears and other wild beasts, and even swarms of bees, against the workmen of Lucullus (Appian, Mithrid. 78). But notwithstanding their gallant defence, the town seems to have perished on that occasion, for Pomponius Mela speaks of it as no longer existing (i. 19), and Strabo does not mention it at all.

Some believe the town of Terme (Therme), at the mouth of the Thermodon, marks the site of ancient Themiscyra; but Hamilton (Researches, i. p. 283) justly observes that it must have been situated a little further inland. Ruins of the place do not appear to exist, for those which Texier regards as indicating the site of Themiscyra, at a distance of two days' journey from the Halys (now called the Kızılırmak River), on the borders of Galatia, cannot possibly have belonged to it, but are in all probability the remains of Tavium. The editors of the Barrington Atlas of the Greek and Roman World, place Themiscyra "at or near" Terme. In ancient times, Themiscyra's bees were famous for their honey.

Themiscyra was previously thought to have been the seat of a bishopric, but is not now included in the Catholic Church's list of titular sees.

== Ancient history ==
In Ancient Greece, Themiscyra was the capital city of the Amazons. One of the most famous myths involving Themiscyra is the story of Heracles's ninth labor, where he was tasked with retrieving the girdle of Queen Hippolyta. According to legend, Hippolyta initially agreed to give Heracles the girdle, but the goddess Hera, disguised as an Amazon, spread rumors of Heracles’ betrayal. This led to a fierce battle, culminating in Hippolyta’s death.

Theseus also visited the city, though there are two versions of this myth. In the first version he accompanied Heracles on his expedition and helped him capture the city, and in the second, Theseus led an expedition of his own, long after Heracles himself had visited the city.

Apollonius of Rhodes, in his Argonautica, mentions that at Thermodon the Amazons were not gathered together in one city, but scattered over the land, divided into three different tribes; in one part dwelt the Themiscyreians (Greek: Θεμισκύρειαι), in another the Lycastians (Greek: Λυκάστιαι), and in another the Chadesians (Greek: Χαδήσιαι).

Jason and the Argonauts passed by Themiscyra on their journey to Colchis. Zeus sent Boreas, the god of the north wind, and with his help the Argonauts stood out from the shore near Themiscyra where the Themiscyraean Amazons were arming for battle.

== Modern cultural references ==
In comic books featuring Wonder Woman, Themyscira is a lush city-state and island country, and the place of origin of Wonder Woman and the Amazons.
