= Çarşamba Plain =

Delta plain in northern Turkey

The Çarşamba Plain is a plain on the Black Sea coast of Turkey, formed largely of the delta of the Yeşilırmak river, but also traversed by the much smaller Terme river. It is the largest delta plain on the Black Sea coast of Turkey. It lies within the districts of Tekkeköy, Çarşamba, Terme, and Salıpazarı on the eastern part of the province of Samsun.

The town of Tekkeköy lies on the west end of the plain. Çarşamba lies in the middle, and is traversed by the Yeşilırmak. Terme (the ancient Themiscyra), on the east, is traversed by the Terme, as is Salıpazarı in the south.

The ancient plain has been described as:

a rich and beautiful district, ever verdant... [that] suppl[ied] food for numberless herds of oxen and horses... produced great abundance of grain, especially pannick and millet... [and that] the southern parts near the mountains furnished a variety of fruits, such as grapes, apples, pears, and nuts in such quantities that they were suffered to waste on the trees.... [m]ythology describes [it] as the native country of the Amazons.

During the Middle Ages, the Yeşilırmak delta was known as Limnia. The area was originally controlled by the Empire of Trebizond, which appointed an official called a kephale ("head") here to collect taxes. Itt was ceded to the Turkish emirate of the Taceddinoğulları in 1379 when the emir Tadj ed-Din married Eudokia, daughter of the Trapezuntine emperor Alexios III. The emirate also controlled the coast east of Çam Burnu, passing Perşembe and Bozuk Kale, which was separated from Limnia by the separate emirate of Chalybia (based at Ünye).
