= Eupatoria (Pontus) =

Hellenistic city of Pontus in Asia Minor

Coordinates: 40.7500°N 36.5000°E

Eupatoria (Ancient Greek: Εὐπατορία) and Magnopolis (Ancient Greek: Μαγνόπολις), or Eupatoria Magnopolis, was a Hellenistic city in the Kingdom of Pontus.

Eupatoria was the crossing-point of two great roads through the Pontus: the east-west from Armenia Minor to Bithynia; and the north-south from Amisus to Caesarea Mazaca. The east-west road followed the valley of the Lycus from Armenia Minor to Phanaroea; it continued over the mountains into the Destek to Laodicea Pontica (modern Ladik), the Halys (Kızılırmak) and the Amnias (Gökırmak) through Paphlagonia to Bithynia; the north-south road went from Amisus (modern Samsun) up the Iris to Amaseia (Amasya), Zela (Zile), up to the Anatolian Plateau and Caesarea Mazaca (Kayseri).

== History ==
=== Kingdom of Pontus ===
The city was founded by Mithridates VI Eupator (r. 120-63 BCE) just south of where the Lycus flows into the Iris, the west end of the fertile valley of Phanaroea, probably in or near the village of Çevresu, Erbaa district, Tokat Province. It was called Eupatoria.

=== Roman period ===
It was completed by Pompey, who renamed it to Magnopolis and extended its territory to include the western Phanaroean plain.

Appian refers to the city by both names, Eupatoria and Magnopolis, while Strabo, in one instance, calls it Megalopolis.

== Bibliography ==
- Deniz Burcu Erciyas, Wealth, Aristocracy and Royal Propaganda Under the Hellenistic Kingdom of the Mithradatids in the Central Black Sea Region of Turkey (Colloquia Pontica), 2005. ISBN 90-04-14609-1. p. 45f.
- David Winfield, "The Northern Routes across Anatolia" Anatolian Studies 27:151-166 (1977) at JSTOR
- J. Arthur R. Munro, "Roads in Pontus, Royal and Roman" The Journal of Hellenic Studies 21:52-66 (1901) ***at JSTOR
