= Phanaroea =

Plain in northern Turkey

Coordinates: 40.71°N 36.55°E

It was largely in the valleys of the Lycus and the Iris that the economic life of interior Pontus was concentrated. The plains through which these rivers flow, rising "like terraces one above another," enjoy the advantages of a mild climate and a fertile soil and so produced rich harvests of grain and fruit; and through them led the highways that connected this remote portion of Asia Minor with the East and West. The most fertile of all was Phanaroea.... This "Garden of Pontus" was rich in olives and vines and "possessed all other good qualities."

—David Magie

The Phanaroea plain (Φανάροια), the modern Erbaa Plain (Erbaa Ovası), is a plain lying mostly in the Erbaa district of Tokat Province in the Black Sea region of Turkey. It runs east-west for about 60 kilometres (37 mi), along the Kelkit River (ancient Lykos) in a valley created by the North Anatolian Fault. It has a maximum width of 8 kilometres (5.0 mi). The Yeşilırmak (ancient Iris) runs along its western edge and is joined by the Kelkit in the northwest corner of the plain. Its altitude ranges from about 200–260 m. The Niksar plain to the east, at 260–300 m altitude, continues the Erbaa plain, and is generally considered part of the Phanaroea.

In the 20th century, it produced grain, fruit, vegetables, tobacco, rice, and opium poppy.

The ancient city of Eupatoria lay near the confluence of the two rivers. The ancient city of Cabira was probably located in the Niksar plain.

Strabo describes Phanaroea as rich in olives and vines and having the best soil in the Pontus.

== See also ==
- 1942 Niksar–Erbaa earthquake
