= Terme =

District an municipality in Samsun, Turkey

- District and municipality
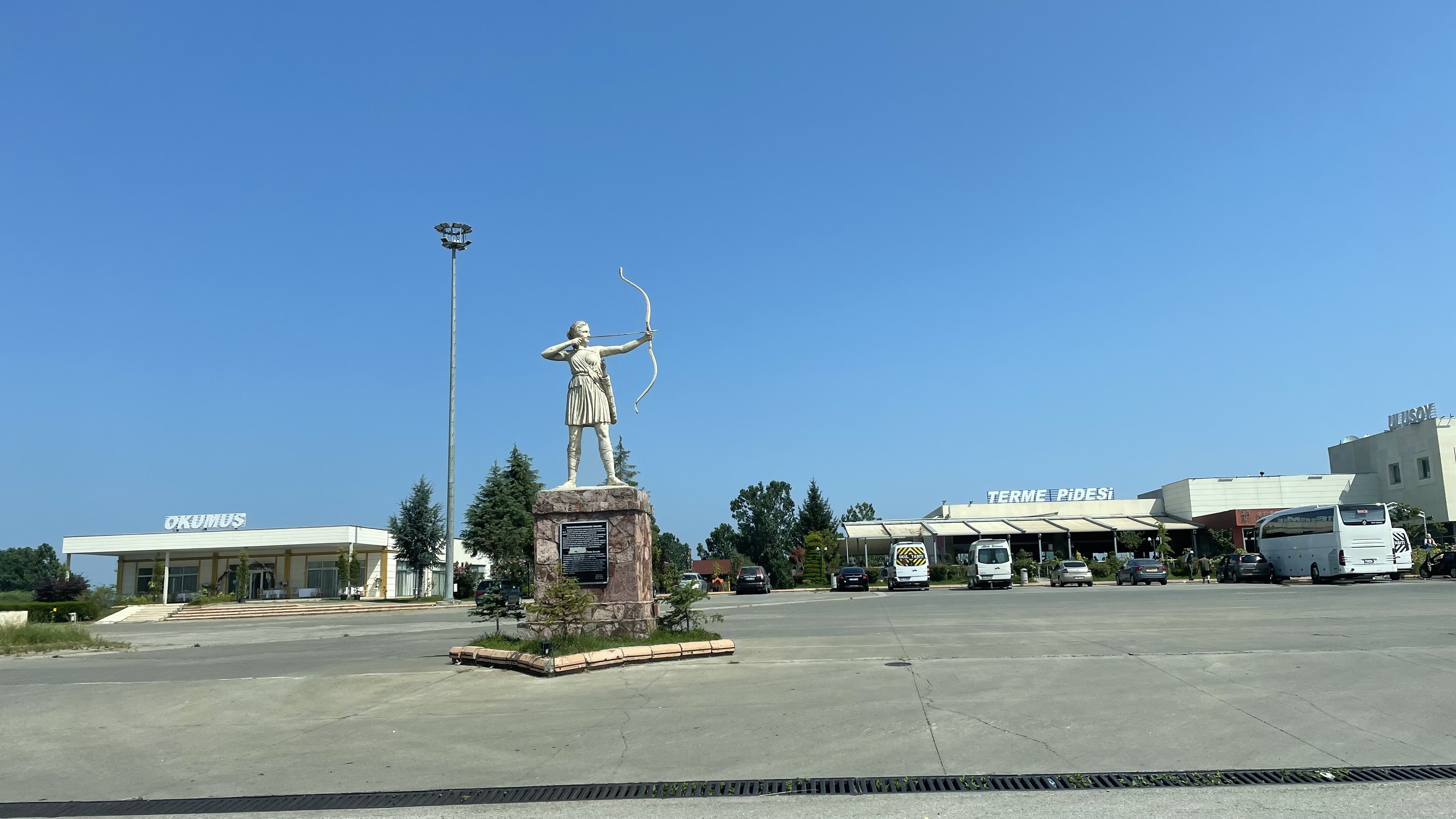
- Bus station of Terme, with a statue of an Amazonian fighter in the foreground

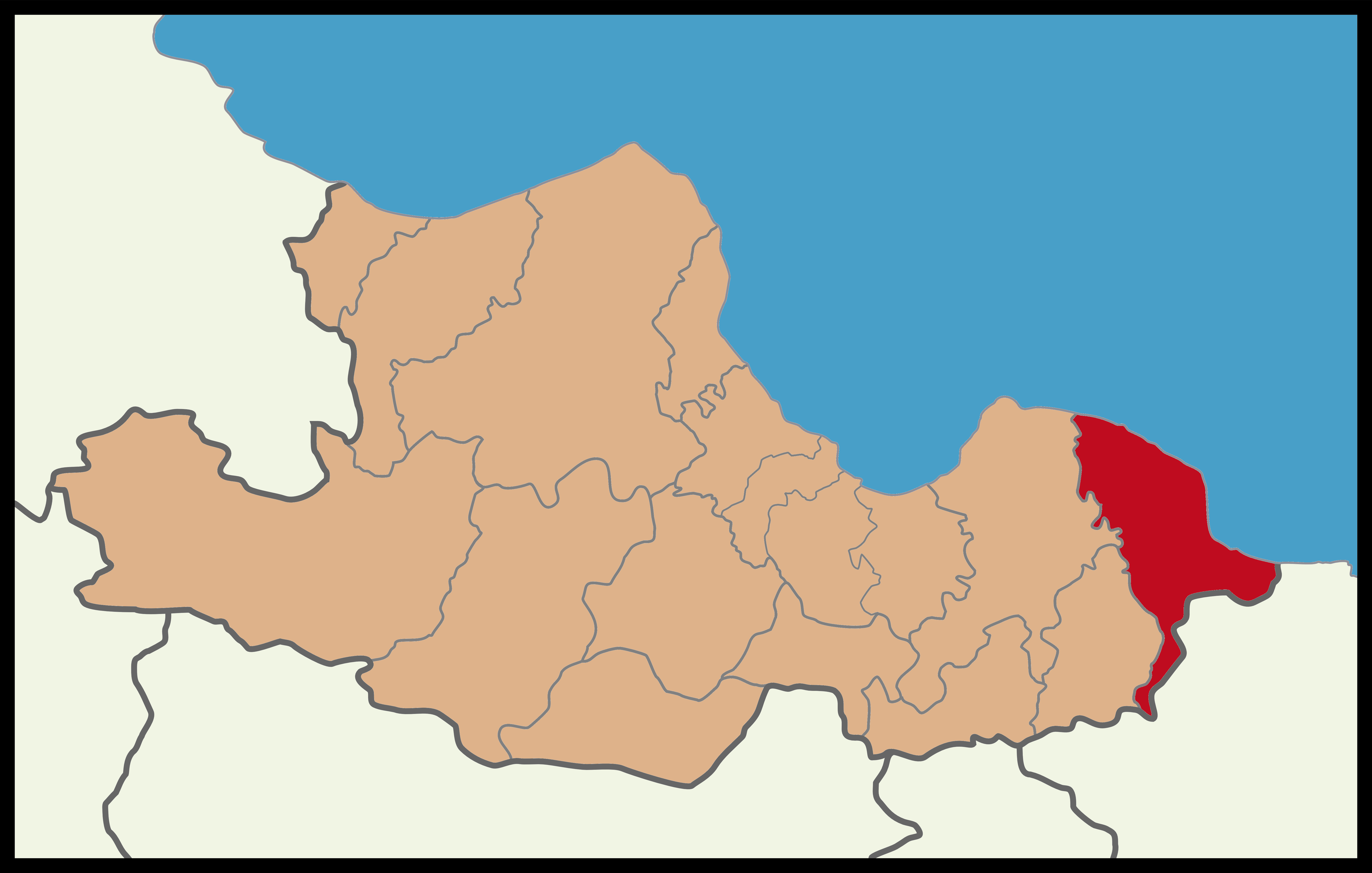
- Map showing Terme District in Samsun Province

- Location within Turkey
- Coordinates: 41°12′33″N 36°58′26″E
- Country: Turkey
- Province: Samsun

Government
  - Mayor: Ali Kılıç (AKP)
- Area: 548 km^{2} (212 sq mi)
- Population (2022): 71,092
  - Density: 130/km^{2} (336/sq mi)
- Time zone: UTC+3 (TRT)
- Postal code: 55600
- Area code: 0362
- Climate: Cfa
- Website: www.terme.bel.tr

Terme, formerly spelled Termeh (Ottoman Turkish: ترمه) is a municipality and district of Samsun Province, Turkey. Its area is 548 km^{2}, and its population is 71,092 (2022). Terme is located on Terme River, about 5 km from its mouth, on the eastern end of the Çarşamba Plain.

Terme or its environs are the site of the ancient city of Themiscyra, Θεμίσκυρα.

Terme District is the site of an annual festival celebrating the Amazons, an ancient nation of all-female warriors who, according to Greek myth, were believed to have lived in the Samsun region.

== Composition ==
There are 82 neighbourhoods in Terme District:

- Ahmetbey
- Akbucak
- Akçagün
- Akçay
- Akçaykaracalı
- Altınlı
- Ambartepe
- Aşağıhüseyinmescit
- Aybeder
- Bafracalı
- Bağsaray
- Bahçelievler
- Bazlamaç
- Beşikli
- Çağlayan
- Çamlıca
- Çanaklı
- Çangallar
- Çardak
- Çay
- Cılar Mahallesi
- Cumhuriyet
- Dağdıralı
- Dereyolu
- Dibekli
- Dutluk
- Elmaköy
- Elmalık
- Emiryusuf
- Erenköy
- Etyemezli
- Evci
- Eyercili
- Fenk
- Geçmiş
- Gökçeağaç
- Gölyazı
- Gündoğdu
- Hüseyinmescit
- İlimdağ
- İmanalisi
- Karacaköy
- Karacalı
- Karamahmut
- Karkucak
- Kazımkarabekirpaşa
- Kesikkaya
- Kocaman
- Kocamanbaşı
- Köybucağı
- Kozluk
- Kumcığaz
- Kuşça
- Kuşçulu
- Mescitköy
- Meşeyazı
- Muratlı
- Oğuzlu
- Örencik
- Ortasöğütlü
- Özyurt
- Sakarlı
- Sancaklı
- Sarayköy
- Şeyhli
- Sivaslılar
- Söğütlü
- Şuayip
- Sütözü
- Taşlık
- Taşpınar
- Uludere
- Uzungazi
- Yalı
- Yeni
- Yenicami
- Yenidoğan
- Yerli
- Yukarısöğütlü
- Yukarıtaşpınar
- Yüksekyayla
- Yunus Emre

== See also ==
- Themiscyra Plain
