= Kelkit River =

River in northern Turkey

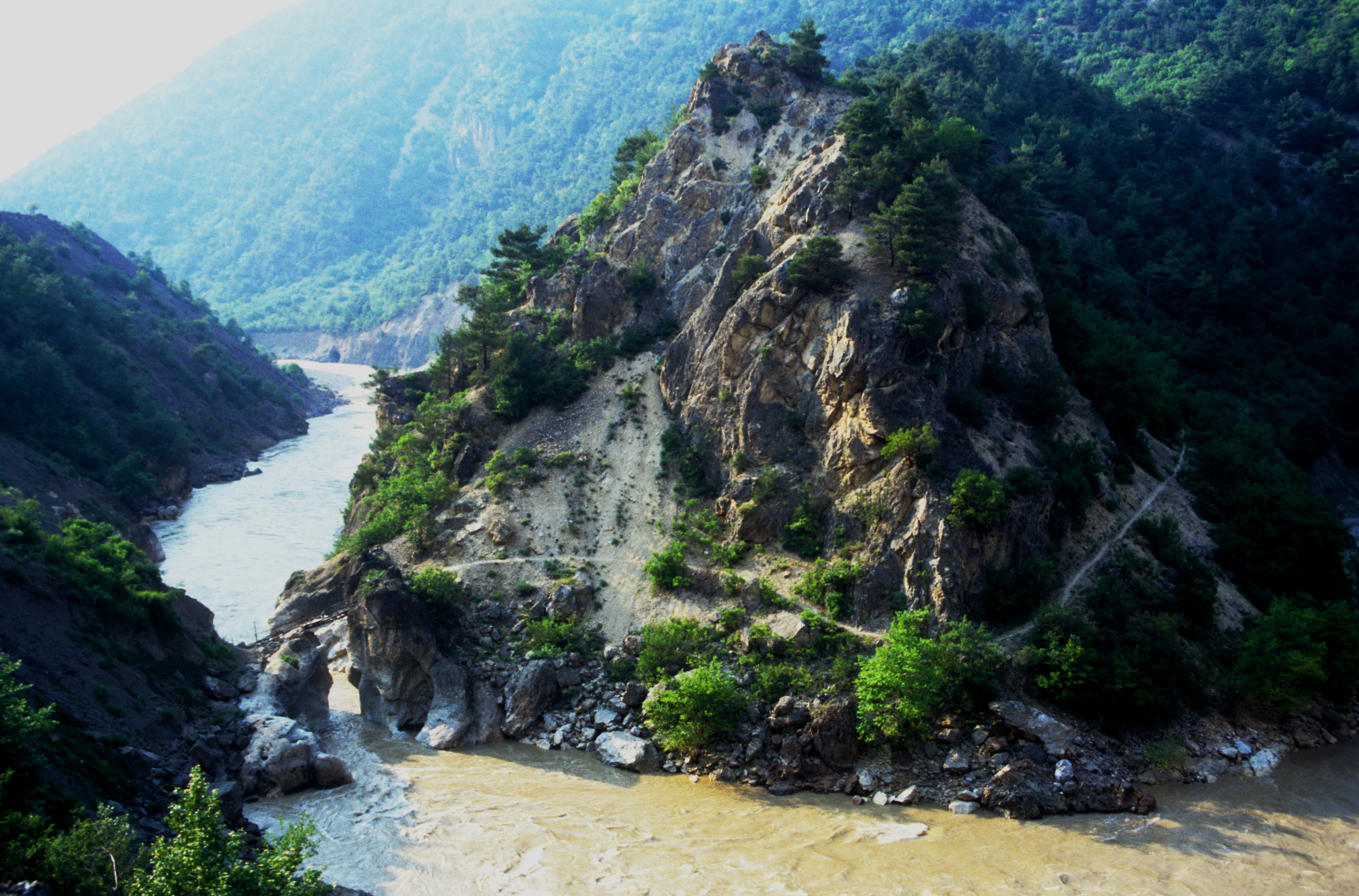

Location
- Country: Turkey

Physical characteristics
- Mouth
  - location: Yeşilırmak River
  - coordinates: 40°45′58″N 36°30′33″E

The Kelkit River (Turkish: Kelkit Irmağı or Kelkit Çayı), is a river in the Black Sea Region of Turkey. It is the longest tributary of the Yeşilırmak. Its name derives from the Armenian Gayl get (Armenian: Գայլ գետ 'wolf river', Kayl ked in Western Armenian pronunciation). Its Greek name is Lykos (Greek: Λύκος), also meaning 'wolf', and romanized as Lycus.

It rises in Gümüşhane Province and runs through the provinces of Erzincan, Giresun, Sivas, and Tokat before flowing into the Yeşilırmak at the modern village of Kızılçubuk, near the site of the ancient city of Eupatoria. The Kelkit follows the North Anatolian Fault for about 150 km from Suşehri to Resadiye and Niksar.

In Hellenistic times, a major east-west road following the valley of the Kelkit led from Armenia Minor to Bithynia.

It was the site of the Battle of the Lycus in 66 BCE.

== Phanaroea ==
The valley for the last 40 km of the Kelkit's journey is the Erbaa plain (Erbaa Ovası), known in antiquity as the Phanaroea.

== Bibliography ==
- Kelkit Basin Museums
