= Yeşilırmak (river) =

River in northern Turkey

Yeşilırmak River
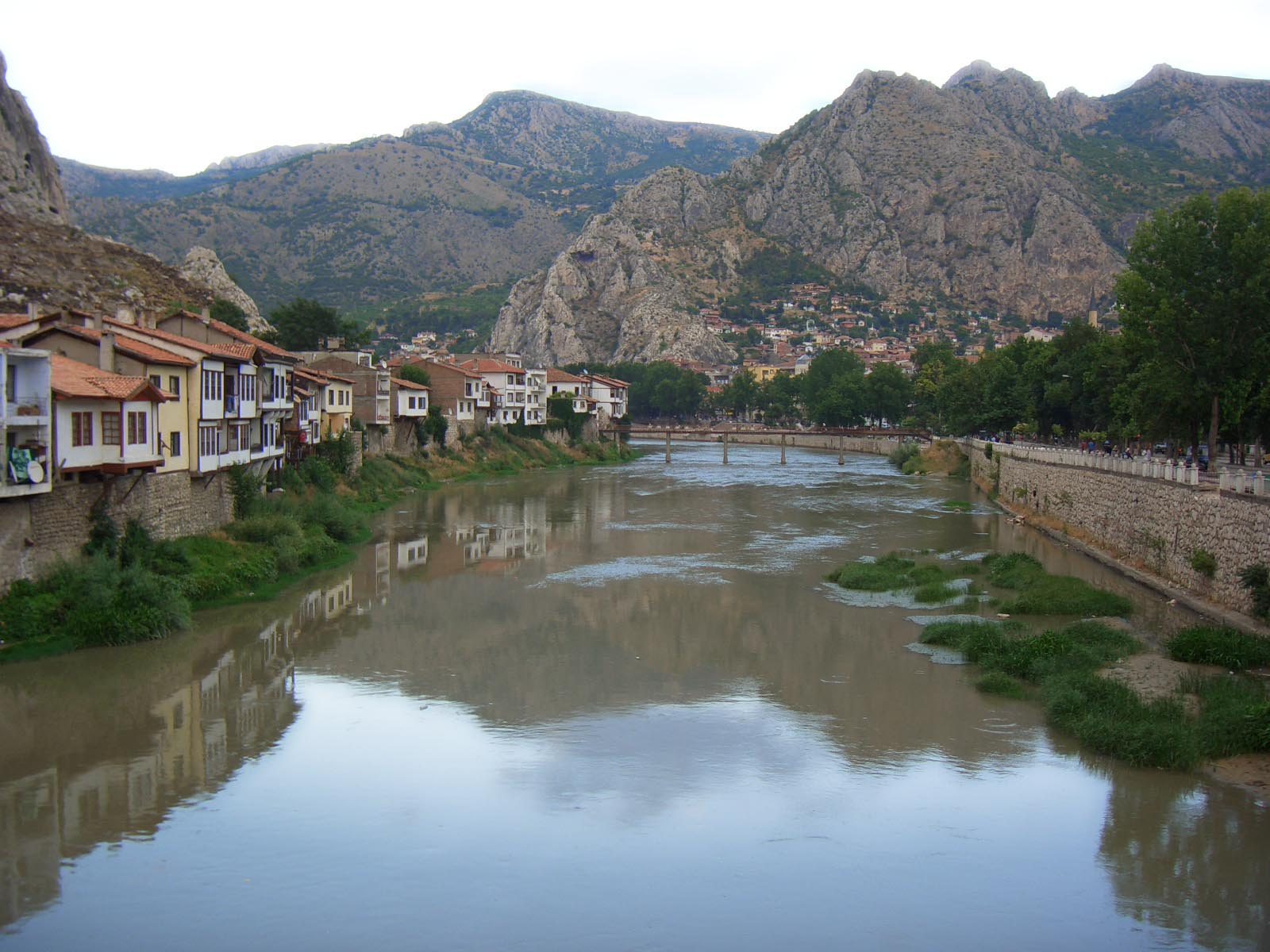
- Yeşilırmak River in Amasya

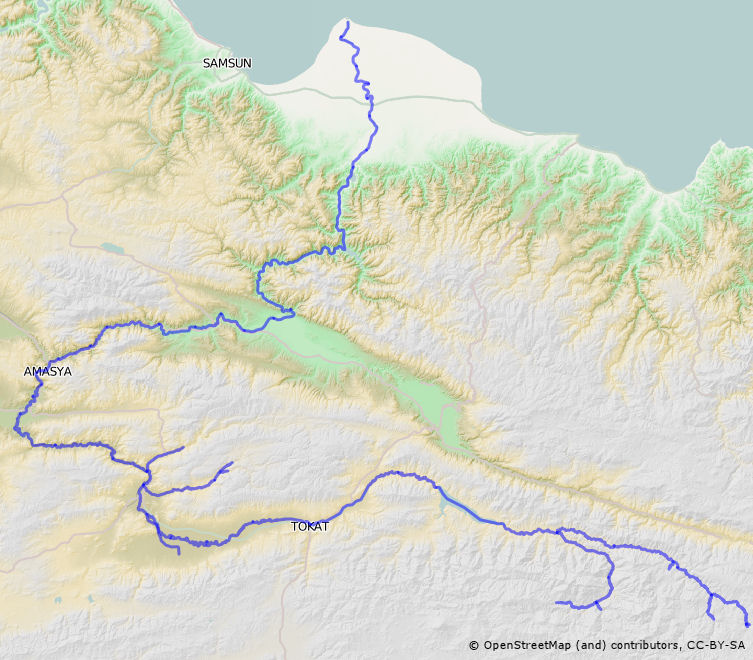
- Map of the Yeşilırmak

Location
- Country: Turkey

Physical characteristics
- Source
  - location: Sivas
- Mouth
  - location: Black Sea
  - coordinates: 41°22′54″N 36°39′37″E
  - elevation: 0 m (0 ft)
- Length: 418 km (260 mi)

The Yeşilırmak (Turkish: Yeşilırmak, lit. 'green river'), known as the Iris in antiquity (Ancient Greek: Ἶρις), is a river in northern Turkey. From its source northeast of Sivas, it flows past Tokat and Amasya, crosses the Pontic Mountains and the Çarşamba Plain, reaching the Black Sea east of Samsun after 418 km (260 mi).

Its tributaries include the Çekerek (ancient Scylax) and the Kelkit (ancient Lycus).

It was mentioned by Menippus of Pergamon in the 1st century BC.

Strabo's Geographica describes it as flowing through Comana Pontica, the plain of Dazimonitis (Kaşova) (40°17′41″N 36°17′48″E), and Gaziura (probably modern Turhal) before receiving the waters (40°33′42″N 35°45′34″E) of the Scylax, then flowing through Amaseia (Amasya) before reaching the valley of Phanaroea.

Starting with Dionysius Periegetes, in his Periegesis of the World, the Iris is often confused with the Thermodon (modern Terme), which also crosses the Themiscyra Plain (modern Çarşamba Plain), with its mouth about 40 km further east; the Thermodon is much smaller and clearer.
