= Amasya Province =

Province of Turkey

Coordinates: 40°41′59″N 35°41′11″E

Amasya Province Amasya ili
- Province
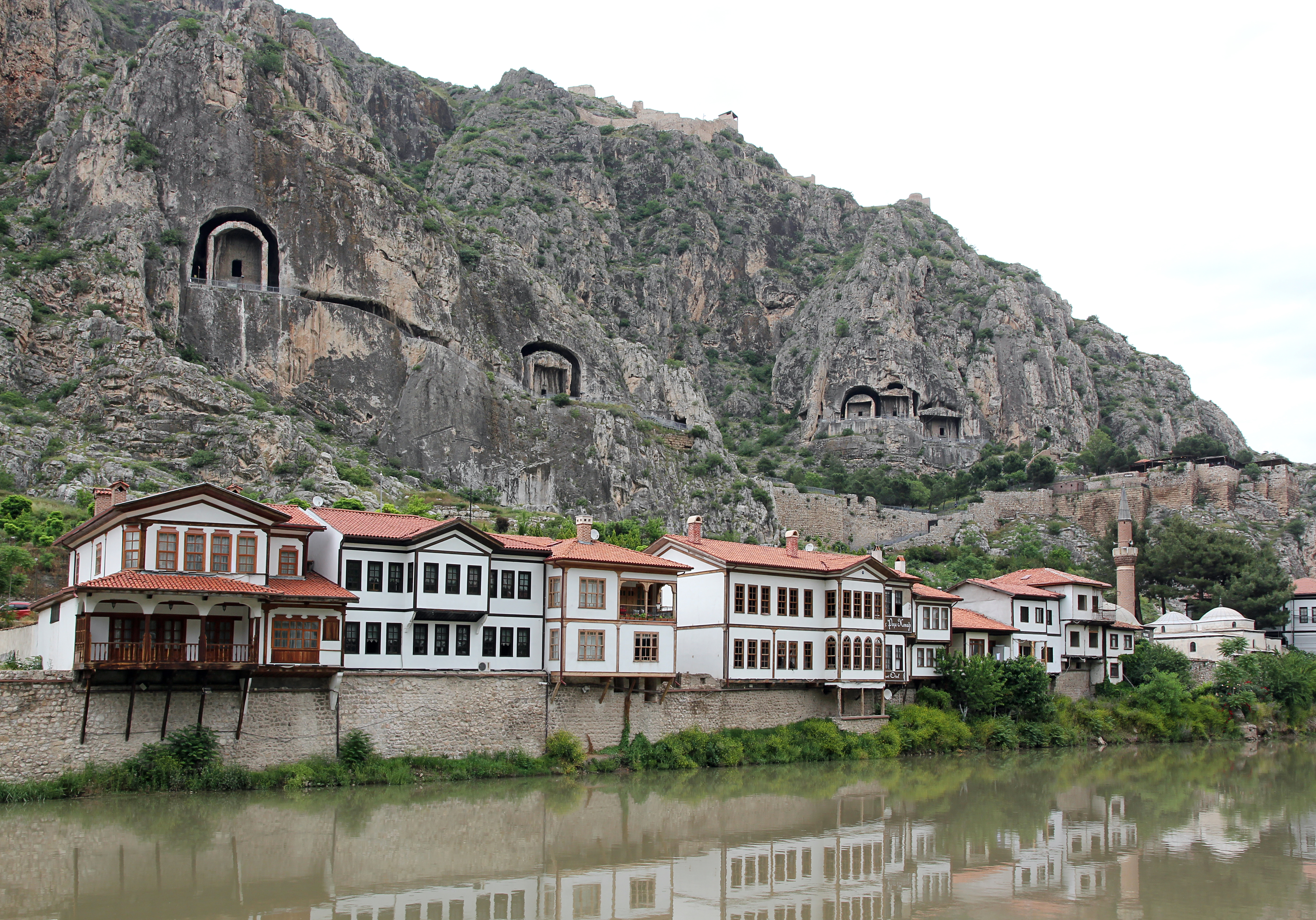
- Amasya houses

- Location of the province within Turkey
- Country: Turkey
- Seat: Amasya

Government
  - Governor: Önder Bakan
- Area: 5,628 km^{2} (2,173 sq mi)
- Population (2022): 338,267
  - Density: 60.10/km^{2} (155.7/sq mi)
- Time zone: UTC+3 (TRT)
- Area code: 0358
- Website: www.amasya.gov.tr

Amasya Province (Turkish: Amasya ili) is a province of Turkey, situated on the Yeşil River in the Black Sea Region to the north of the country. Its area is 5,628 km^{2}, and its population is 338,267 (2022).

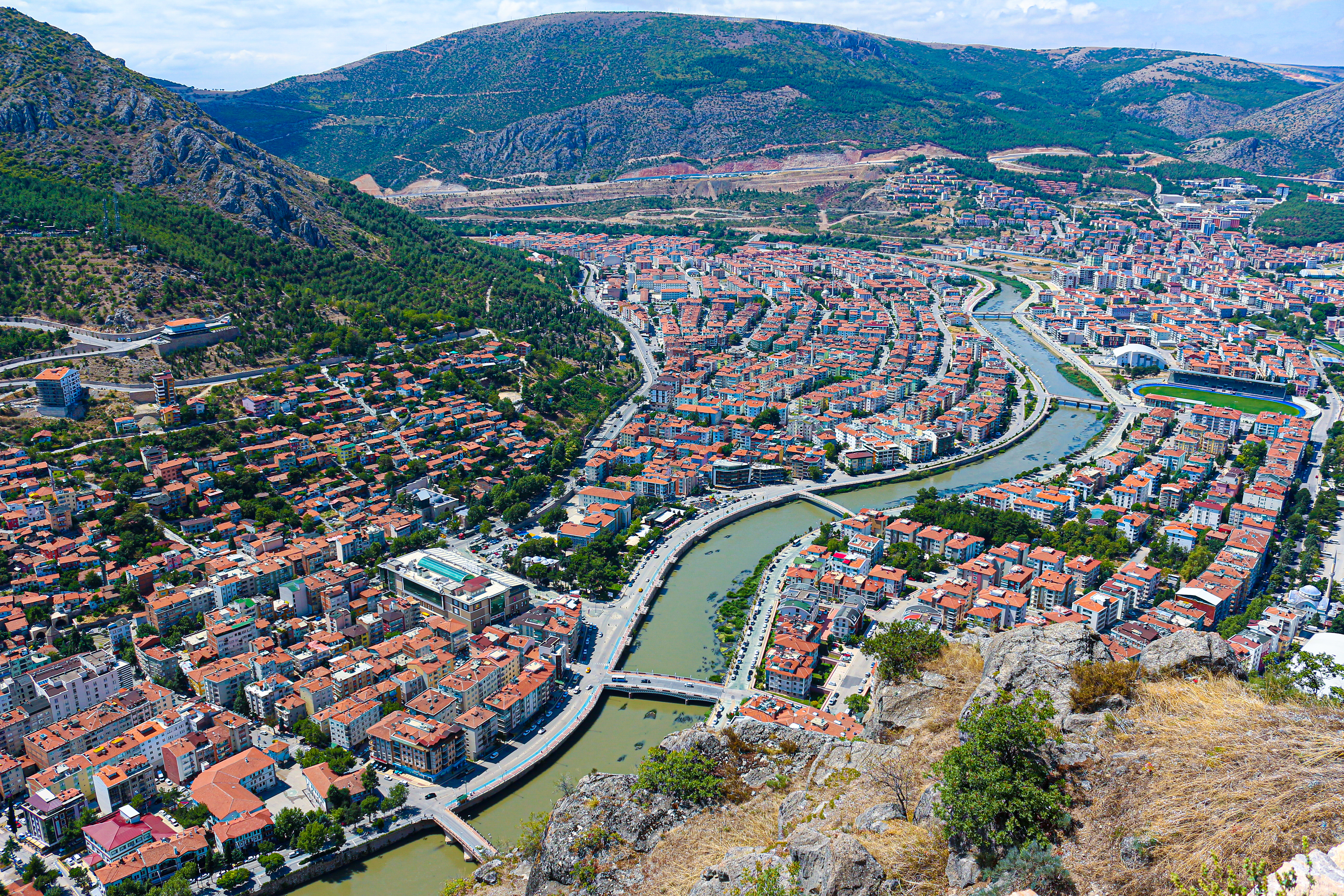
View overlooking Amasya city.

The provincial capital is Amasya, the antique Amaseia mentioned in documents from the era of Alexander the Great and the birthplace of the geographer and historian Strabo. In Ottoman times Amasya was well known for its madrassas, especially as a centre for the Khalwati Sufi order. The district is also the birthplace of the Ottoman leader Kara Mustafa Pasha.

== Demographics ==
Historical population
Year	Pop.	±% p.a.
1927	114,884	—
1935	128,113	+1.37%
1940	136,029	+1.21%
1950	163,669	+1.87%
1960	257,281	+4.63%
1970	307,025	+1.78%
1980	341,287	+1.06%
1990	357,191	+0.46%
2000	365,231	+0.22%
2010	334,786	−0.87%
2020	335,494	+0.02%
Source:Turkstat

== Geography ==
Amasya, between the Black Sea and inner Anatolia, lies at the centre of a region of fertile plains crossed by the Yeşilırmak, Çekerek, and Tersakan rivers. Despite being near the Black Sea, Amasya has hot summers and moderately cold winters. Amasya is an agricultural province known as the best apple growing province in the country, and also producing tobacco, peaches, cherries and okra.

== Districts ==
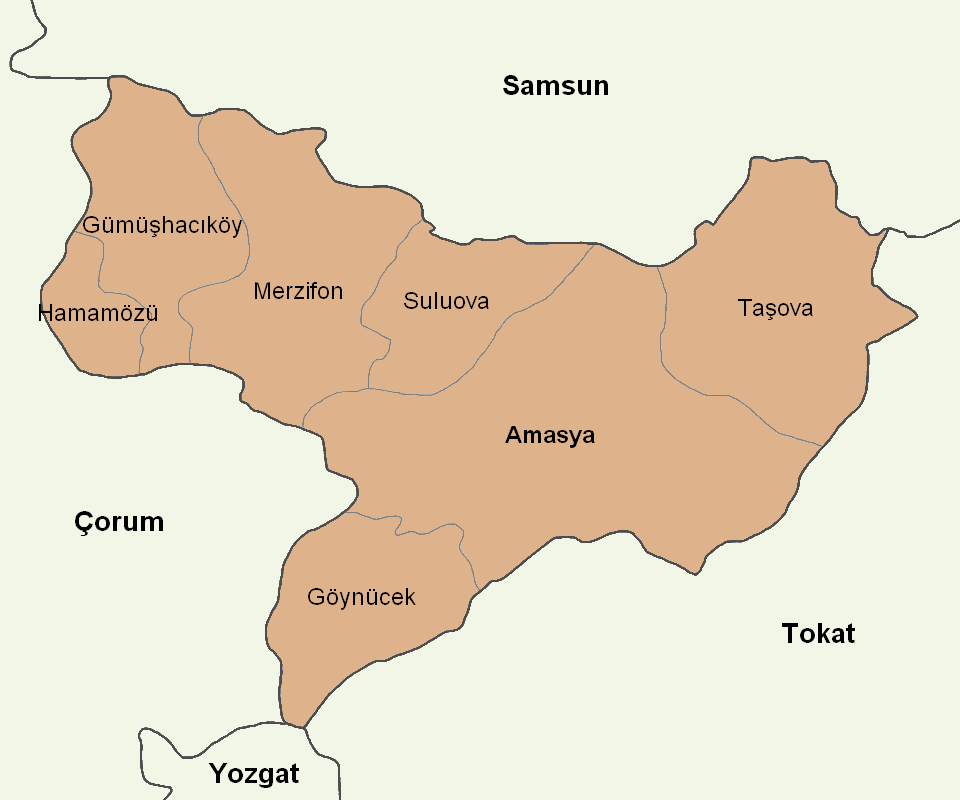

Amasya province is divided into 7 districts (capital district in bold):

- **Amasya**
- Göynücek
- Gümüşhacıköy
- Hamamözü
- Merzifon
- Suluova
- Taşova
