= List of populated places in Amasya Province =

This is a list of populated places in Amasya Province, Turkey by districts.

== Amasya ==
- Amasya
- Ziyaret
- Abacı
- Aksalur
- Aktaş
- Akyazı
- Alakadı
- Albayrak
- Ardıçlar
- Avşar
- Aydınca
- Aydınlık
- Aydoğdu
- Bağlarüstü
- Bağlıca
- Bayat
- Beke
- Beldağı
- Boğaköy
- Böke
- Bulduklu
- Çatalçam
- Çavuşköy
- Çengelkayı
- Çiğdemlik
- Çivi
- Dadıköy
- Damudere
- Değirmendere
- Direkli
- Doğantepe
- Duruca
- Eliktekke
- Ermiş
- Eskikızılca
- Ezinepazar
- Gerne
- Gökdere
- Gözlek
- Halifeli
- Hasabdal
- İbecik
- İlgazi
- İlyas
- İpekköy
- Kaleboğazı
- Kaleköy
- Kapıkaya
- Karaali
- Karaçavuş
- Karaibrahim
- Karakese
- Karaköprü
- Karataş
- Karsan
- Kayabaşı
- Kayacık
- Kayrak
- Keçili
- Keşlik
- Kızılca
- Kızılkışlacık
- Kızoğlu
- Kızseki
- Köyceğiz
- Küçükkızılca
- Kutu
- Kuzgeçe
- Mahmatlar
- Meşeliçiftliği
- Musaköy
- Oluz
- Ormanözü
- Ortaköy
- Ovasaray
- Özfındıklı
- Saraycık
- Sarayözü
- Sarıalan
- Sarıkız
- Sarımeşe
- Sarıyar
- Sazköy
- Sevincer
- Şeyhsadi
- Sıracevizler
- Soma
- Tatar
- Tuzsuz
- Ümük
- Uygur
- Yağcıabdal
- Yağmur
- Yassıçal
- Yavru
- Yeşildere
- Yeşilöz
- Yıkılgan
- Yıldızköy
- Yolyanı
- Yuvacık
- Yuvaköy

== Göynücek ==
- Göynücek
- Abacı
- Alan
- Ardıçpınar
- Asar
- Ayvalıpınar
- Başpınar
- Bekdemir
- Beşiktepe
- Çamurlu
- Çayan
- Çaykışla
- Çulpara
- Damlaçimen
- Davutevi
- Gaffarlı
- Gediksaray
- Gökçeli
- Harmancık
- Hasanbey
- İkizyaka
- Ilısu
- Karaşar
- Karayakup
- Kertme
- Kervansaray
- Kışlabeyi
- Konuralan
- Koyuncu
- Kuyulu Kavaklı
- Pembeli
- Şarklı
- Şeyhler
- Şeyhoğlu
- Sığırçayı
- Tencerli
- Terziköy
- Yassıkışla
- Yeniköy

== Gümüşhacıköy ==
- Gümüşhacıköy
- Akpınar
- Alören
- Aşağıovacık
- Bacakoğlu
- Bademli
- Balıklı
- Beden
- Çalköy
- Çavuşköy
- Çetmi
- Çiftçioğlu
- Çitli
- Derbentobruğu
- Doluca
- Dumanlı
- Eslemez
- Güllüce
- Güplüce
- Güvemözü
- İmirler
- Kağnıcı
- Karaali
- Karacaören
- Karakaya
- Keçiköy
- Kılıçaslan
- Kırca
- Kızık
- Kızılca
- Kiziroğlu
- Koltuk
- Konuktepe
- Korkut
- Köseler
- Kutluca
- Kuzalan
- Ovabaşı
- Pusacak
- Sallar
- Saraycık
- Sarayözü
- Sekü
- Yazıyeri
- Yeniköy

== Hamamözü ==
- Hamamözü
- Alanköy
- Arpadere
- Çayköy
- Damladere
- Dedeköy
- Göçeri
- Gölköy
- Hıdırlar
- Kızılcaören
- Mağaraobruğu
- Omarca
- Sarayözü
- Tekçam
- Tepeköy
- Tutkunlar
- Yemişen
- Yukarıovacık

== Merzifon ==
- Merzifon
- Akören
- Akpınar
- Aksungur
- Aktarla
- Alıcık
- Alişar
- Aşağıbük
- Bahçecik
- Balgöze
- Bayat
- Bayazıt
- Bulak
- Büyükçay
- Çamlıca
- Çavundur
- Çaybaşı
- Çayırköy
- Çayırözü
- Çobanören
- Demirpınar
- Derealan
- Diphacı
- Elmayolu
- Esentepe
- Eymir
- Gelinsini
- Gökçebağ
- Gümüştepe
- Hacet
- Hacıyakup
- Hanköy
- Hayrettinköy
- Hırka
- İnalanı
- Kamışlı
- Karacakaya
- Karamağara
- Karamustafapaşa
- Karatepe
- Karşıyaka
- Kayadüzü
- Kıreymir
- Kızıleğrek
- Koçköy
- Küçükçay
- Kuyuköy
- Mahmutlu
- Muşruf
- Ortabük
- Ortaova
- Osmanoğlu
- Oymaağaç
- Oymak
- Pekmezci
- Saraycık
- Sarıbuğday
- Sarıköy
- Sazlıca
- Selimiye
- Şeyhyeni
- Türkoğlu
- Uzunyazı
- Yakupköy
- Yalnız
- Yaylacık
- Yenice
- Yeşilören
- Yeşiltepe
- Yolüstü
- Yukarıbük

== Suluova ==
- Suluova
- Akören
- Alabedir
- Armutlu
- Arucak
- Aşağıkarasu
- Ayrancı
- Bayırlı
- Boyalı
- Çayüstü
- Çukurören
- Derebaşalan
- Dereköy
- Deveci
- Eğribük
- Eraslan
- Gürlü
- Harmanağılı
- Kanatpınar
- Kapancı
- Karaağaç
- Kazanlı
- Kerimoğlu
- Kılıçaslan
- Kıranbaşalan
- Kolay
- Kulu
- Küpeli
- Kurnaz
- Kutlu
- Kuzalan
- Oğulbağı
- Ortayazı
- Özalakadı
- Salucu
- Saygılı
- Seyfe
- Soku
- Uzunoba
- Yolpınar
- Yüzbeyi

== Taşova ==
- Taşova
- Alçakbel
- Alpaslan
- Altınlı
- Andıran
- Ardıçönü
- Arpaderesi
- Ballıca
- Belevi
- Boraboy
- Çakırsu
- Çalkaya
- Çambükü
- Çaydibi
- Çılkıdır
- Dereköy
- Dereli
- Destek
- Devre
- Dörtyol
- Durucasu
- Dutluk
- Elmakırı
- Esençay
- Gemibükü
- Geydoğan
- Gökpınar
- Güngörmüş
- Gürsu
- Güvendik
- Hacıbeyköyü
- Hüsnüoğlu
- Ilıcaköy
- Ilıpınar
- Karabük
- Karamuk
- Karlık
- Karsavul
- Kavaloluğu
- Kırkharman
- Kızgüldüren
- Korubaşı
- Kozluca
- Kumluca
- Mercimekköy
- Mülkbükü
- Özbaraklı
- Şahinler
- Sepetli
- Şeyhli
- Sofualan
- Tatlıpınar
- Tekke
- Tekpınar
- Türkmendamı
- Uluköy
- Yayladibi
- Yaylasaray
- Yenidere
- Yerkozlu
- Yeşiltepe
- Yeşilyurt
- Yolaçan
- Yukarıbaraklı
