= Karaali =

Karaali (literally "black Ali" in Turkish) may refer to:

- Karaali, Amasya, a village in the district of Amasya, Amasya Province, Turkey
- Karaali, Baskil
- Karaali, Elâzığ
- Karaali, Gölbaşı, a neighborhood of the district of Gölbaşı, Ankara Province, Turkey
- Karaali, Gümüşhacıköy, a village in the district of Gümüşhacıköy, Amasya Province, Turkey
- Karaali Rocks, a group of rocks in Antarctica
