= Yuvacık =

Yuvacık (literally "little home" or "little nest" in Turkish) may refer to:

- The Turkish name of Chrysiliou, a village in northern Cyprus
- Yuvacık, Amasya, a village in the district of Amasya, Amasya Province, Turkey
- Yuvacık, Bitlis, a village
- Yuvacık, Çınar
- Yuvacık, Kaş, a village in the district of Kaş, Antalya Province, Turkey
- Yuvacık, Kulp
