= Gerne =

- Village
- Location within Turkey
- Coordinates: 40.67124°N 35.54311°E
- Country: Turkey
- Province: Amasya
- District: Amasya
- Population (2022): 239
- Time zone: UTC+3 (TRT)

Gerne (formerly: Ağılönü) is a village in the Amasya District, Amasya Province, in northern Turkey. Its population is 239 (2022).

== Geography ==
The village lies to the north of İlgazi, northwest of Ortaköy and southeast of Gümüştepe, and 31 km (19 mi) by road west of the district capital of Amasya.

== Demographics ==
Historical population
Year	Pop.	±% p.a.
1985	675	—
1997	569	−1.41%
2007	440	−2.54%
2012	368	−3.51%
2017	300	−4.00%
2022	239	−4.44%
Source: 1985 census, 1997 census and TÜIK (2007-2022)
