= Abacı =

Abacı (IPA: [aˈbadʒɯ]) is a Turkish surname meaning "tailor or weaver of aba" (a kind of coarse fabric), and may refer to:

- Muazzez Abacı (1947–2025), Turkish female singer

== See also ==
- Abacı, Amasya, village in the central (Amasya) district of Amasya Province, Turkey
- Abacı, Göynücek, village in the district of Göynücek, Amasya Province, Turkey
