= Duruca =

Duruca can refer to the following villages in Turkey:

- Duruca, Amasya
- Duruca, Karayazı
- Duruca, Nusaybin
- Duruca, Taşköprü
