= Ayrancı (disambiguation) =

Ayrancı is a town and district of Karaman Province in the Central Anatolia region of Turkey.

Ayrancı may also refer to:

- Sinan Ayrancı (born 1990), Turkish-Swedish footballer
- Ayrancı Dam, dam in Buğdaylı, Turkey, built between 1956 and 1958
- Ayrancı, Beşiri, a village in the district of Beşiri, Batman Province, Turkey
- Ayrancı, Suluova, a village in the district of Suluova, Amasya Province, Turkey
