= Aydoğdu =

Aydoğdu is a Turkish word and it may refer to:

== Surname ==
- Aydoğdu (surname)

== Places ==
- Aydoğdu, Amasya, a village in the district of Amasya, Amasya Province, Turkey
- Aydoğdu, Erzincan
- Aydoğdu, Güney
- Aydoğdu, Şenkaya
- Aydoğdu, Tavas, a village in district of Tavas, Denizli Province in Turkey
- Aydoğdu, Yenişehir
- Aydoğdu, Vezirköprü, a village in district of Vezirköprü, Samsun Province, Turkey
