= Alanköy =

Alanköy (literally "field village") is a Turkish place name that may refer to the following places in Turkey:

- Alanköy, Bigadiç, a village
- Alanköy, Çanakkale
- Alanköy, Göynücek, a village in the district of Göynücek, Amasya Province
- Alanköy, Göynük, a village in the district of Göynük, Bolu Province
- Alanköy, Hamamözü, a village in the district of Hamamözü, Amasya Province
- Alanköy, Nallıhan, a village in the district of Nallıhan, Ankara Province
- Alanköy, Vezirköprü, a village in the district of Vezirköprü, Samsun Province
- Alanköy, Yeşilova
