= Karaçavuş =

Karaçavuş can refer to:

- Karaçavuş, Amasya
- Karaçavuş, Elâzığ
