= Keşlik =

Keşlik can refer to:

- Keşlik, Amasya
- Keşlik, Karacabey
