= Toklucak =

Toklucak (literally "place of yearling lambs") is a Turkish place name that may refer to the following places in Turkey:

- Toklucak, Amasya, a village in the district of Amasya, Amasya Province
- Toklucak, Emirdağ, a village in the district of Emirdağ, Afyonkarahisar Province
