= Sarıalan =

Sarıalan can refer to:

- Sarıalan, Amasya
- Sarıalan, Kurşunlu
- Sarıalan, Osmancık
- Sarıalan, Vezirköprü
