= İbecik =

İbecik can refer to:

- İbecik, Amasya
- İbecik, Gölhisar
