= Kaleboğazı =

Kaleboğazı can refer to:

- Kaleboğazı, Amasya
- Kaleboğazı, Oltu
