= Yavru =

Yavru may refer to:

- Yavru, Amasya, a village in Amasya Province, Turkey
- Zeki Yavru, Turkish footballer
