= Aydınlık (disambiguation) =

Aydınlık is a Turkish daily newspaper.

Aydınlık (literally "luminousness") is a Turkish word. It may also refer to the following places in Turkey:

- Aydınlık, Amasya, a village in the district of Amasya, Amasya Province
- Aydınlık, Sason, a village in the district of Sason, Batman Province
