= Ilısu =

Ilısu (literally "warm water") is a Turkish place name and may refer to:

- Ilısu, Aksaray, a town is Güzelyurt district of Aksaray Province, Turkey
- Ilısu, Göynücek, a village in Göynücek district of Amasya Province, Turkey
- Ilısu, Gülnar, a village in Gülnar district of Mersin Province, Turkey
- İlisu, Azerbaijan
- Ilısu, Tercan

Note the difference between the two Turkish 'I's: dotted(i=ee) and dotless (ı=eh) especially in capitals (I,İ)

== See also ==
- Ilısu Dam, a dam under construction in Turkey
  - Ilısu Dam Campaign, an international campaign to stop the construction of the dam
