= Çatalçam =

Çatalçam may refer to the following places in Turkey:

- Çatalçam, Amasya
- Çatalçam, Bayramiç
- Çatalçam, Dargeçit
- Çatalçam, Dursunbey
- Çatalçam, Kastamonu
- Çatalçam, Kaynaşlı
- Çatalçam, Refahiye
- Çatalçam, Tufanbeyli
