= Yolpınar =

Yolpınar (literally "road springs" in Turkish) may refer to:

- Yolpınar, Suluova, a village in the district of Suluova, Amasya Province, Turkey
- Yolpınar, Vezirköprü, a village in the district of Vezirköprü, Samsun Province, Turkey
