= Kerimoğlu =

Kerimoğlu is a Turkish surname that may refer to the following notable people:

- Kerimoğlu, Suluova, village in Amasya Province, Turkey
- Tugay Kerimoğlu, Turkish footballer
- Zeynep Kerimoğlu (born 2003), Turkish women's footballer
