= Aksalur, Amasya =

Aksalur
- Village
- Location within Turkey
- Coordinates: 40.51523°N 35.78822°E
- Country: Turkey
- Province: Amasya
- District: Amasya
- Population (2021): 523
- Time zone: UTC+3 (TRT)

Aksalur is a village in the Amasya District, Amasya Province, Turkey. Its population is 523 (2021).

== Geography ==
The village lies to the south of Kayabaşı and northeast of Musaköy, 23.4 kilometres (14.5 mi) by road south of the district capital of Amasya.

== Demographics ==
In 2012 the village had a population of 589 people. It has a declining population. In 1985 it had 860 people, and in 2000 it had 760.
