= Abacı, Göynücek =

Abacı
- Village
- Location within Turkey
- Coordinates: 40.40893°N 35.59933°E
- Country: Turkey
- Province: Amasya
- District: Göynücek
- Population (2021): 39
- Time zone: UTC+3 (TRT)

Abacı is a village in the Göynücek District, Amasya Province, Turkey. Its population is 39 (2021).

== Geography ==
The village lies in the hills to the northeast of Göynücek. The Çekerek River flows to the west through Göynücek, up to the village of Şeyhler, northwest of Abacı.
