= Göynücek District =

District of Amasya Province, Turkey

- District
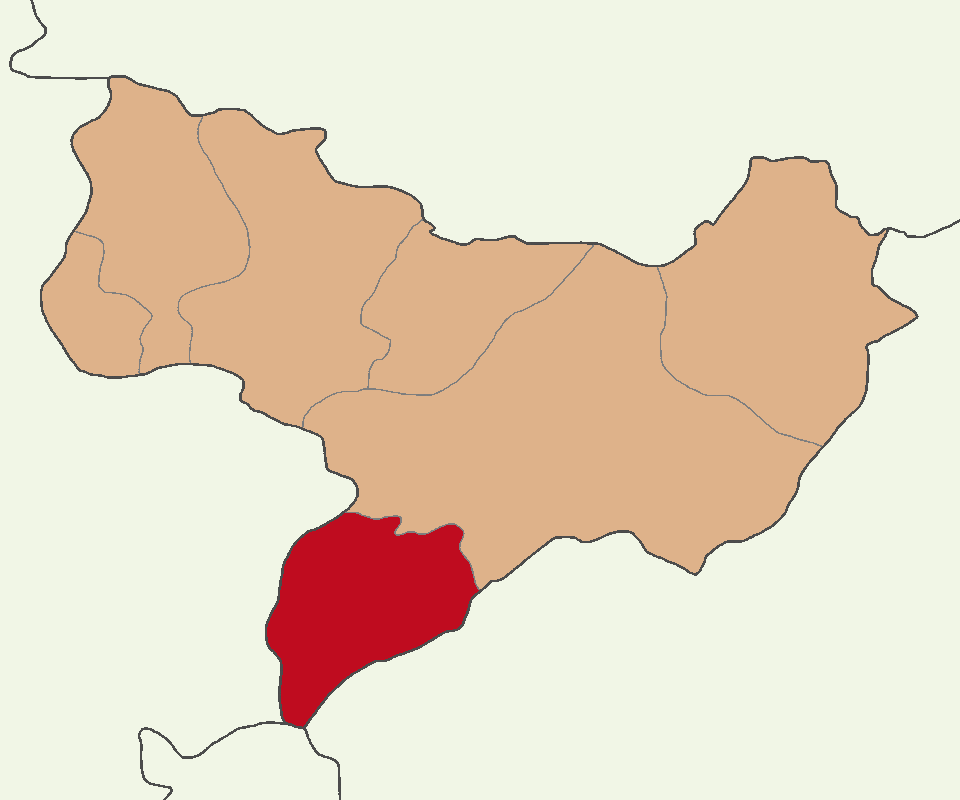
- Map showing Göynücek District in Amasya Province

- Location in Turkey
- Coordinates: 40°23′N 35°31′E
- Country: Turkey
- Province: Amasya
- Seat: Göynücek

Government
  - Kaymakam: Mücahit Aydoğdu
- Area: 591 km^{2} (228 sq mi)
- Population (2021): 10,291
  - Density: 17/km^{2} (45/sq mi)
- Time zone: UTC+3 (TRT)
- Website: www.goynucek.gov.tr

Göynücek District is a district of Amasya Province of Turkey. Its seat is the town Göynücek. Its area is 591 km^{2}, and its population is 10,291 (2021). It borders the provinces of Tokat, Çorum and Yozgat.

== Composition ==
There is one municipality in Göynücek District:

- Göynücek

There are 38 villages in Göynücek District:

- Abacı
- Alan
- Ardıçpınar
- Asar
- Ayvalıpınar
- Başpınar
- Bekdemir
- Beşiktepe
- Çamurlu
- Çayan
- Çaykışla
- Çulpara
- Damlaçimen
- Davutevi
- Gaffarlı
- Gediksaray
- Gökçeli
- Harmancık
- Hasanbey
- İkizyaka
- Ilısu
- Karaşar
- Karayakup
- Kertme
- Kervansaray
- Kışlabeyi
- Konuralan
- Koyuncu
- Kuyulu Kavaklı
- Pembeli
- Şarklı
- Şeyhler
- Şeyhoğlu
- Sığırçayı
- Tencerli
- Terziköy
- Yassıkışla
- Yeniköy

== Places of interest ==
- The Roman castle of Gökçeli on a rock overlooking the valley, 8 km from the town Göynücek. It is reached by a hidden path of 98 steps.
- The mineral waters of the village of Çamurlu, said to relieve kidney stones.
