= Suluova District =

District of Amasya Province, Turkey

- District
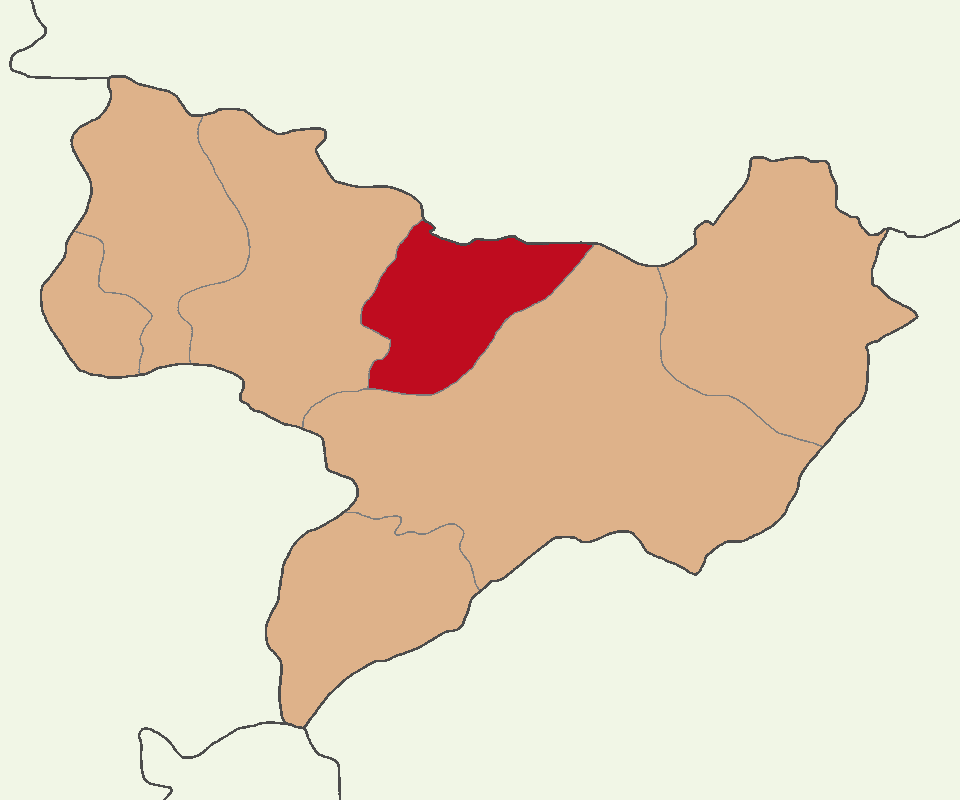
- Map showing Suluova District in Amasya Province

- Location in Turkey
- Coordinates: 40°50′N 35°39′E
- Country: Turkey
- Province: Amasya
- Seat: Suluova

Government
  - Kaymakam: Şafak Gürçam
- Area: 456 km^{2} (176 sq mi)
- Population (2021): 47,066
  - Density: 100/km^{2} (270/sq mi)
- Time zone: UTC+3 (TRT)
- Website: www.suluova.gov.tr

Suluova District is a district of Amasya Province of Turkey. Its seat is the town Suluova. Its area is 456 km^{2}, and its population is 47,066 (2021).

== Composition ==
There is one municipality in Suluova District:

- Suluova

There are 40 villages in Suluova District:

- Akören
- Alabedir
- Armutlu
- Arucak
- Aşağıkarasu
- Ayrancı
- Bayırlı
- Boyalı
- Çayüstü
- Çukurören
- Derebaşalan
- Dereköy
- Deveci
- Eğribük
- Eraslan
- Gürlü
- Harmanağılı
- Kanatpınar
- Kapancı
- Karaağaç
- Kazanlı
- Kerimoğlu
- Kılıçaslan
- Kıranbaşalan
- Kolay
- Kulu
- Küpeli
- Kurnaz
- Kutlu
- Kuzalan
- Oğulbağı
- Ortayazı
- Özalakadı
- Salucu
- Saygılı
- Seyfe
- Soku
- Uzunoba
- Yolpınar
- Yüzbeyi
