= Amasya District =

District of Amasya Province, Turkey

- District
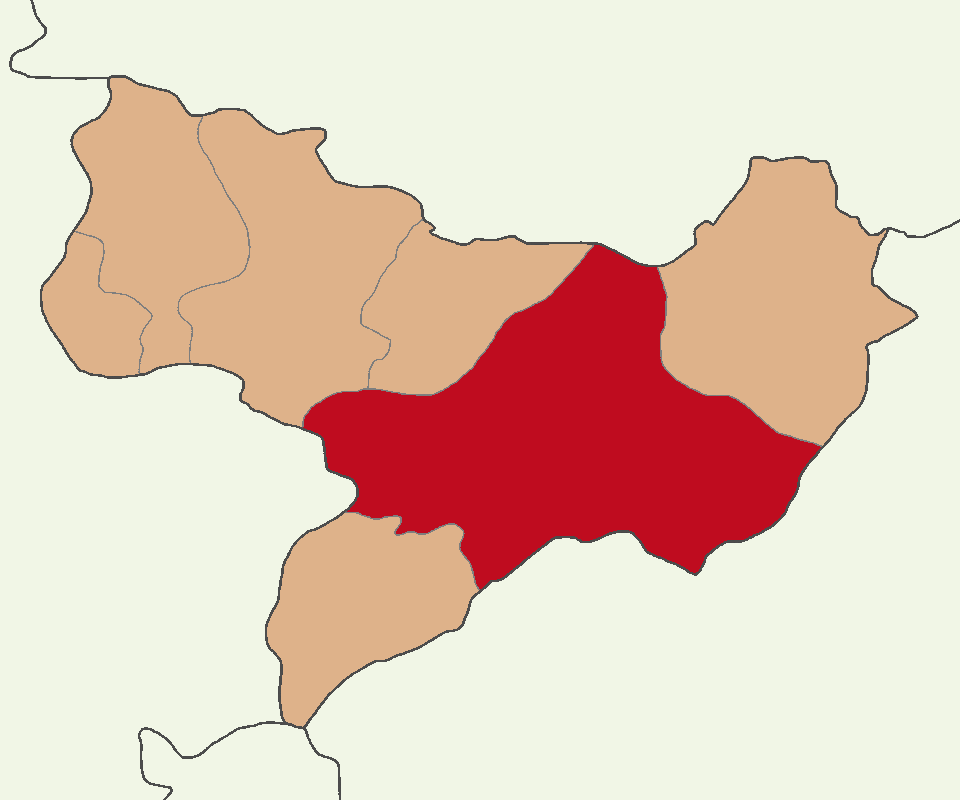
- Map showing Amasya District in Amasya Province

- Location in Turkey
- Coordinates: 40°39′N 35°50′E
- Country: Turkey
- Province: Amasya
- Seat: Amasya
- Area: 1,889 km^{2} (729 sq mi)
- Population (2021): 147,380
  - Density: 78/km^{2} (200/sq mi)
- Time zone: UTC+3 (TRT)

Amasya District (also: Merkez, meaning "central") is a district of Amasya Province of Turkey. Its seat is the city Amasya. Its area is 1,889 km^{2}, and its population is 147,380 (2021).

== Composition ==
There are two municipalities in Amasya District:

- Amasya
- Ziyaret

There are 100 villages in Amasya District:

- Abacı
- Aksalur
- Aktaş
- Akyazı
- Alakadı
- Albayrak
- Ardıçlar
- Avşar
- Aydınca
- Aydınlık
- Aydoğdu
- Bağlarüstü
- Bağlıca
- Bayat
- Beke
- Beldağı
- Boğaköy
- Böke
- Bulduklu
- Çatalçam
- Çavuşköy
- Çengelkayı
- Çiğdemlik
- Çivi
- Dadıköy
- Damudere
- Değirmendere
- Direkli
- Doğantepe
- Duruca
- Eliktekke
- Ermiş
- Eskikızılca
- Ezinepazar
- Gerne
- Gökdere
- Gözlek
- Halifeli
- Hasabdal
- İbecik
- İlgazi
- İlyas
- İpekköy
- Kaleboğazı
- Kaleköy
- Kapıkaya
- Karaali
- Karaçavuş
- Karaibrahim
- Karakese
- Karaköprü
- Karataş
- Karsan
- Kayabaşı
- Kayacık
- Kayrak
- Keçili
- Keşlik
- Kızılca
- Kızılkışlacık
- Kızoğlu
- Kızseki
- Köyceğiz
- Küçükkızılca
- Kutu
- Kuzgeçe
- Mahmatlar
- Meşeliçiftliği
- Musaköy
- Oluz
- Ormanözü
- Ortaköy
- Ovasaray
- Özfındıklı
- Saraycık
- Sarayözü
- Sarıalan
- Sarıkız
- Sarımeşe
- Sarıyar
- Sazköy
- Sevincer
- Şeyhsadi
- Sıracevizler
- Soma
- Tatar
- Tuzsuz
- Ümük
- Uygur
- Yağcıabdal
- Yağmur
- Yassıçal
- Yavru
- Yeşildere
- Yeşilöz
- Yıkılgan
- Yıldızköy
- Yolyanı
- Yuvacık
- Yuvaköy
