= Hamamözü District =

District of Amasya Province, Turkey

- District
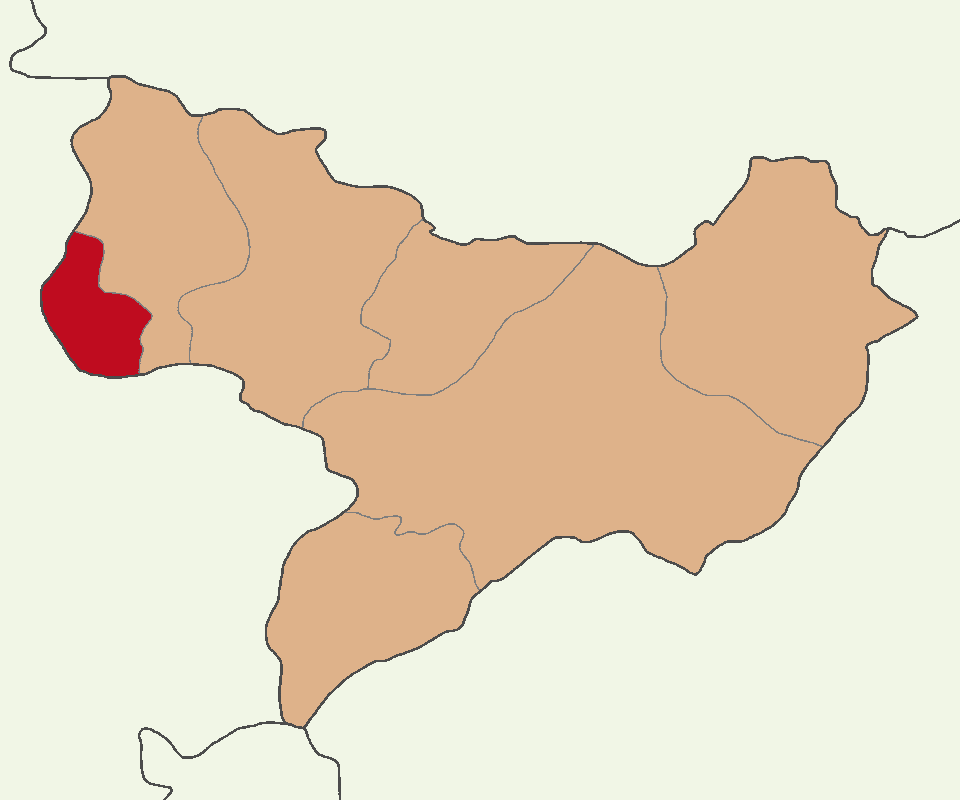
- Map showing Hamamözü District in Amasya Province

- Location in Turkey
- Coordinates: 40°47′N 35°02′E
- Country: Turkey
- Province: Amasya
- Seat: Hamamözü

Government
  - Kaymakam: Şeyma Şendur
- Area: 204 km^{2} (79 sq mi)
- Population (2021): 3,565
  - Density: 17/km^{2} (45/sq mi)
- Time zone: UTC+3 (TRT)
- Website: www.hamamozu.gov.tr

Hamamözü District is a district of Amasya Province of Turkey. Its seat is the town Hamamözü. Its area is 204 km^{2}, and its population is 3,565 (2021). The district was established in 1990 when it separated from the larger Gümüşhacıköy District. The district is home to numerous Circassian villages.

== Composition ==
There is one municipality in Hamamözü District:

- Hamamözü

There are 17 villages in Hamamözü District:

- Alanköy
- Arpadere
- Çayköy
- Damladere
- Dedeköy
- Göçeri
- Gölköy
- Hıdırlar
- Kızılcaören
- Mağaraobruğu
- Omarca
- Sarayözü
- Tekçam
- Tepeköy
- Tutkunlar
- Yemişen
- Yukarıovacık
