= Akyazı, Amasya =

Akyazı
- Village
- Location within Turkey
- Coordinates: 40°26′43″N 35°46′30″E
- Country: Turkey
- Province: Amasya
- District: Amasya
- Population (2021): 74
- Time zone: UTC+3 (TRT)

Akyazı is a village in the Amasya District, Amasya Province, Turkey. Its population is 74 (2021).

== Geography ==
The village lies near the border with Tokat Province, to the southeast of Musaköy, 32.9 kilometres (20.4 mi) by road south of the district capital of Amasya.

== Demographics ==
In 2012 the village had a population of 41 people. It has a severely declining population. In 1985 it had 296 people, and by 2000 only 92.
