= Çayan, Göynücek =

Çayan
- Village
- Location within Turkey
- Coordinates: 40.4857°N 35.4696°E
- Country: Turkey
- Province: Amasya
- District: Göynücek
- Population (2021): 52
- Time zone: UTC+3 (TRT)

Çayan is a village in the Göynücek District, Amasya Province, Turkey. Its population is 52 (2021).
