= Aydınca, Amasya =

Aydınca
- Village
- Location within Turkey
- Coordinates: 40.5644°N 36.1403°E
- Country: Turkey
- Province: Amasya
- District: Amasya
- Population (2021): 462
- Time zone: UTC+3 (TRT)

Aydınca is a village in the Amasya District, Amasya Province, Turkey. Its population is 462 (2021). Before the 2013 reorganisation, it was a town (belde).
