= Bulduklu, Amasya =

Bulduklu
- Village
- Location within Turkey
- Coordinates: 40.6119°N 35.7508°E
- Country: Turkey
- Province: Amasya
- District: Amasya
- Population (2021): 132
- Time zone: UTC+3 (TRT)

Bulduklu is a village in the Amasya District, Amasya Province, Turkey. Its population is 132 (2021).
