= Kurnaz, Suluova =

Kurnaz
- Village
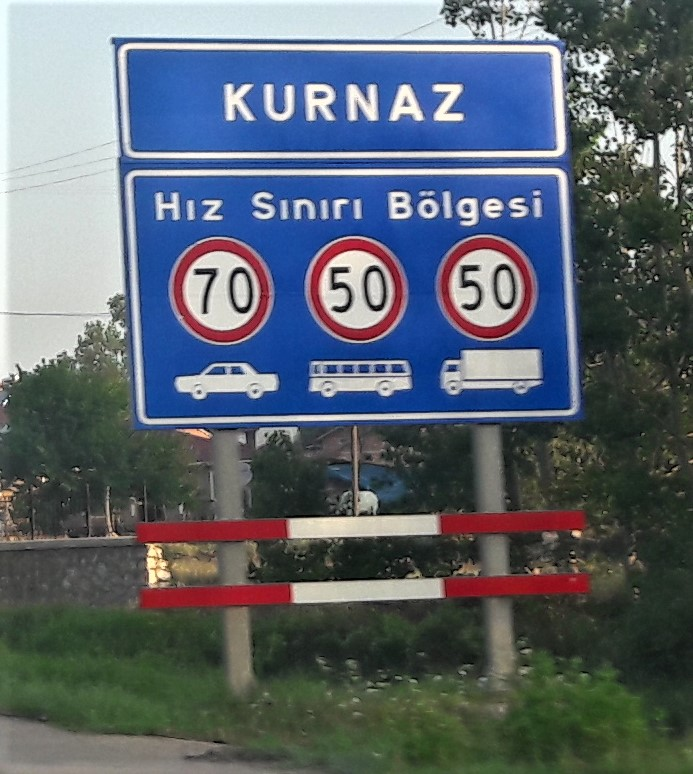

- Location within Turkey
- Coordinates: 40°46′N 35°42′E
- Country: Turkey
- Province: Amasya
- District: Suluova
- Population (2021): 344
- Time zone: UTC+3 (TRT)

Kurnaz is a village in the Suluova District, Amasya Province, Turkey. Its population is 344 (2021).
