= Gaffarlı, Göynücek =

Gaffarlı
- Village
- Location within Turkey
- Coordinates: 40.4318°N 35.7099°E
- Country: Turkey
- Province: Amasya
- District: Göynücek
- Population (2021): 94
- Time zone: UTC+3 (TRT)

Gaffarlı (also: Kafarlı) is a village in the Göynücek District, Amasya Province, Turkey. Its population is 94 (2021).
