= Eskikızılca, Amasya =

Eskikızılca
- Village
- Location within Turkey
- Coordinates: 40°35′N 36°02′E
- Country: Turkey
- Province: Amasya
- District: Amasya
- Population (2021): 36
- Time zone: UTC+3 (TRT)

Eskikızılca is a village in the Amasya District, Amasya Province, Turkey. Its population is 36 (2021).
