= Kaleköy, Amasya =

Kaleköy
- Village
- Location within Turkey
- Coordinates: 40.6022°N 35.9322°E
- Country: Turkey
- Province: Amasya
- District: Amasya
- Population (2021): 417
- Time zone: UTC+3 (TRT)

Kaleköy is a village in the Amasya District, Amasya Province, Turkey. Its population is 417 (2021).
