= Asar, Göynücek =

Asar
- Village
- Location within Turkey
- Coordinates: 40.4828°N 35.5029°E
- Country: Turkey
- Province: Amasya
- District: Göynücek
- Population (2021): 50
- Time zone: UTC+3 (TRT)

Asar is a village in the Göynücek District, Amasya Province, Turkey. Its population is 50 (2021).
