= Gökdere, Amasya =

Gökdere
- Village
- Location within Turkey
- Country: Turkey
- Province: Amasya
- District: Amasya
- Population (2021): 22
- Time zone: UTC+3 (TRT)

Gökdere is a village in the Amasya District, Amasya Province, Turkey. Its population is 22 (2021).
