= Aktaş, Amasya =

Aktaş
- Village
- Location within Turkey
- Coordinates: 40.8073°N 36.0076°E
- Country: Turkey
- Province: Amasya
- District: Amasya
- Population (2021): 50
- Time zone: UTC+3 (TRT)

Aktaş is a village in the Amasya District, Amasya Province, Turkey. Its population is 50 (2021).

== Demographics ==
In 2012 the village had a population of 45 people. In 2000 it had 55 people.
