= Uzunoba, Suluova =

Uzunoba
- Village
- Location within Turkey
- Coordinates: 40°45′06″N 35°43′39″E
- Country: Turkey
- Province: Amasya
- District: Suluova
- Population (2021): 324
- Time zone: UTC+3 (TRT)

Uzunoba is a village in the Suluova District, Amasya Province, Turkey. Its population is 324 (2021).
