= Kızseki, Amasya =

Kızseki
- Village
- Location within Turkey
- Coordinates: 40°46′N 36°00′E
- Country: Turkey
- Province: Amasya
- District: Amasya
- Population (2021): 571
- Time zone: UTC+3 (TRT)

Kızseki is a village in the Amasya District, Amasya Province, Turkey. Its population is 571 (2021).
