= İkizyaka, Göynücek =

İkizyaka
- Village
- Location within Turkey
- Coordinates: 40.39797°N 35.63033°E
- Country: Turkey
- Province: Amasya
- District: Göynücek
- Population (2021): 121
- Time zone: UTC+3 (TRT)

İkizyaka is a village in the Göynücek District, Amasya Province, Turkey. Its population is 121 (2021).
