= Alakadı, Amasya =

Alakadı
- Village
- Location within Turkey
- Coordinates: 40°41′N 35°43′E
- Country: Turkey
- Province: Amasya
- District: Amasya
- Population (2021): 106
- Time zone: UTC+3 (TRT)

Alakadı is a village in the Amasya District, Amasya Province, Turkey. Its population is 106 (2021).
