= Saygılı, Suluova =

Saygılı
- Village
- Location within Turkey
- Coordinates: 40.7238°N 35.6739°E
- Country: Turkey
- Province: Amasya
- District: Suluova
- Population (2021): 165
- Time zone: UTC+3 (TRT)

Saygılı is a village in the Suluova District, Amasya Province, Turkey. Its population is 165 (2021).
