= Eğribük, Suluova =

Eğribük
- Village
- Location within Turkey
- Coordinates: 40.8253°N 35.8286°E
- Country: Turkey
- Province: Amasya
- District: Suluova
- Population (2021): 137
- Time zone: UTC+3 (TRT)

Eğribük is a village in the Suluova District, Amasya Province, Turkey. Its population is 137 (2021).
