= Karaağaç, Suluova =

Karaağaç
- Village
- Location within Turkey
- Coordinates: 40.8536°N 35.7538°E
- Country: Turkey
- Province: Amasya
- District: Suluova
- Population (2021): 94
- Time zone: UTC+3 (TRT)

Karaağaç is a village in the Suluova District, Amasya Province, Turkey. Its population is 94 (2021).
