= Sarıkız, Amasya =

Sarıkız
- Village
- Location within Turkey
- Country: Turkey
- Province: Amasya
- District: Amasya
- Population (2021): 248
- Time zone: UTC+3 (TRT)

Sarıkız is a village in the Amasya District, Amasya Province, Turkey. Its population was 248 as of 2021.
