= Kıranbaşalan, Suluova =

Kıranbaşalan
- Village
- Location within Turkey
- Coordinates: 40°51′N 35°47′E
- Country: Turkey
- Province: Amasya
- District: Suluova
- Population (2021): 44
- Time zone: UTC+3 (TRT)

Kıranbaşalan is a village in the Suluova District, Amasya Province, Turkey. Its population is 44 (2021).
