= Damladere, Hamamözü =

Damladere
- Village
- Location within Turkey
- Coordinates: 40°46′N 35°02′E
- Country: Turkey
- Province: Amasya
- District: Hamamözü
- Population (2021): 173
- Time zone: UTC+3 (TRT)

Damladere is a village in the Hamamözü District, Amasya Province, Turkey. Its population is 173 (2021).
