= Çukurören, Suluova =

Çukurören
- Village
- Location within Turkey
- Coordinates: 40.8030°N 35.7870°E
- Country: Turkey
- Province: Amasya
- District: Suluova
- Population (2021): 65
- Time zone: UTC+3 (TRT)

Çukurören is a village in the Suluova District, Amasya Province, Turkey. Its population is 65 (2021).

One of Turkey's largest dams is being built in the Çukurören region.
