= Eliktekke, Amasya =

Eliktekke
- Village
- Location within Turkey
- Coordinates: 40°26′N 35°45′E
- Country: Turkey
- Province: Amasya
- District: Amasya
- Population (2021): 49
- Time zone: UTC+3 (TRT)

Eliktekke is a village in the Amasya District, Amasya Province, Turkey. Its population is 49 (2021).
