= Terziköy, Göynücek =

Terziköy
- Village
- Location within Turkey
- Coordinates: 40°27′58″N 35°41′03″E
- Country: Turkey
- Province: Amasya
- District: Göynücek
- Population (2021): 125
- Time zone: UTC+3 (TRT)

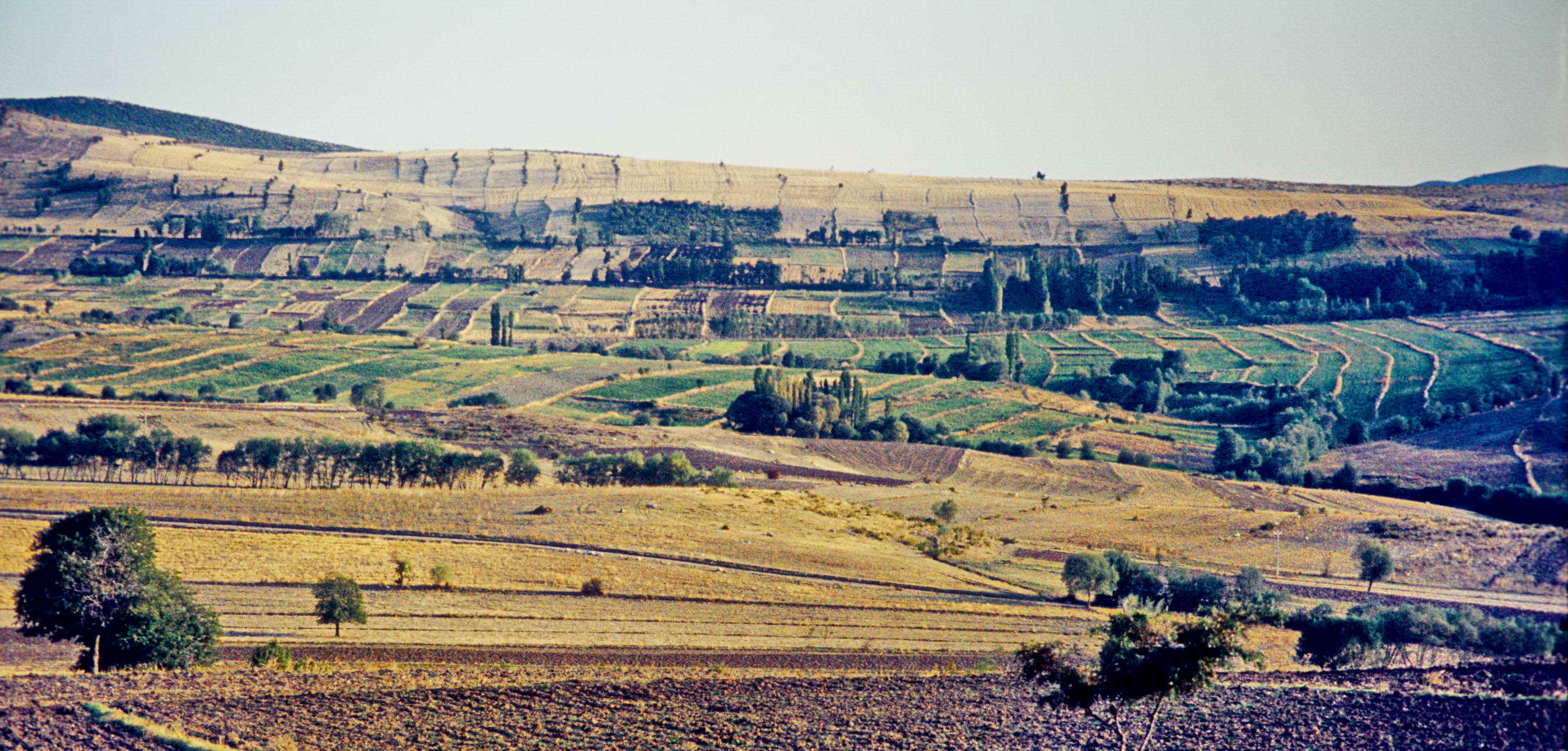
fields in Terziköy

Terziköy is a village in the Göynücek District, Amasya Province, Turkey. Its population is 125 (2021).
