= Sarayözü, Hamamözü =

Sarayözü
- Village
- Location within Turkey
- Country: Turkey
- Province: Amasya
- District: Hamamözü
- Population (2021): 168
- Time zone: UTC+3 (TRT)

Sarayözü is a village in the Hamamözü District, Amasya Province, Turkey. Its population is 168 (2021).
