= Gökçeli, Göynücek =

Gökçeli
- Village
- Location within Turkey
- Coordinates: 40.4110°N 35.4791°E
- Country: Turkey
- Province: Amasya
- District: Göynücek
- Population (2021): 31
- Time zone: UTC+3 (TRT)

Gökçeli is a village in the Göynücek District, Amasya Province, Turkey. Its population is 31 (2021).
