= Özfındıklı, Amasya =

Özfındıklı
- Village
- Location within Turkey
- Coordinates: 40°29′N 36°06′E
- Country: Turkey
- Province: Amasya
- District: Amasya
- Population (2021): 86
- Time zone: UTC+3 (TRT)

Özfındıklı is a village of 86 (as of 2021) in the Amasya District of Amasya Province in Turkey.
