= Damudere, Amasya =

Damudere
- Village
- Location within Turkey
- Coordinates: 40.4777°N 35.8138°E
- Country: Turkey
- Province: Amasya
- District: Amasya
- Population (2021): 412
- Time zone: UTC+3 (TRT)

Damudere is a village in the Amasya District, Amasya Province, Turkey. Its population is 412 (2021).
