= Dereköy, Suluova =

Dereköy
- Village
- Location within Turkey
- Coordinates: 40.8067°N 35.7321°E
- Country: Turkey
- Province: Amasya
- District: Suluova
- Population (2021): 193
- Time zone: UTC+3 (TRT)

Dereköy (also: Dere) is a village in the Suluova District, Amasya Province, Turkey. Its population is 193 (2021).
