= Duruca, Nusaybin =

Village in Mardin Province, Turkey

Duruca
- Neighbourhood
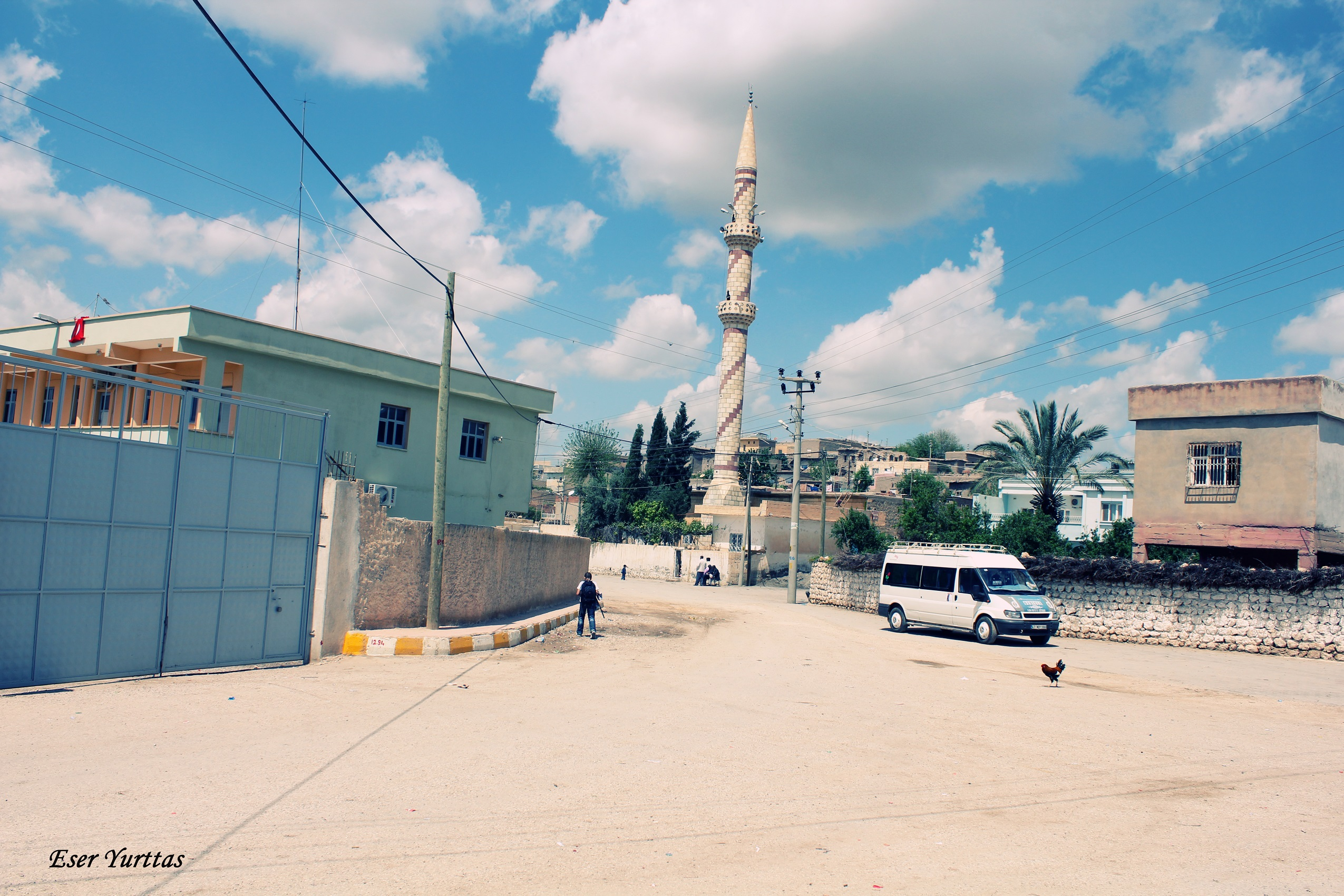

- Location within Turkey
- Coordinates: 37.091°N 41.309°E
- Country: Turkey
- Province: Mardin
- District: Nusaybin
- Population (2022): 2,664
- Time zone: UTC+3 (TRT)

Duruca (Kurdish: Kertwen; Syriac: Kartwīn) is a neighbourhood of the municipality and district of Nusaybin, Mardin Province, Turkey. Its population is 2,664 (2022). Before the 2013 reorganisation, it was a town (belde). The village is populated by Kurds of the Kikan and Mizizex tribes.

== History ==
Kartwīn (today called Duruca) was historically inhabited by Syriac Orthodox Christians. In the Syriac Orthodox patriarchal register of dues of 1870, it was recorded that the village had two households, who did not pay any dues, and it did not have a church or a priest.

== Bibliography ==
- Bcheiry, Iskandar (2009). The Syriac Orthodox Patriarchal Register of Dues of 1870: An Unpublished Historical Document from the Late Ottoman Period. Gorgias Press.
- Tan, Altan (2018). Turabidin'den Berriye'ye. Aşiretler - Dinler - Diller - Kültürler (in Turkish). Pak Ajans Yayincilik Turizm Ve Diş Ticaret Limited şirketi. ISBN 9789944360944.
