= Şeyhsadi, Amasya =

Şeyhsadi
- Village
- Location within Turkey
- Coordinates: 40°32′N 36°06′E
- Country: Turkey
- Province: Amasya
- District: Amasya
- Population (2021): 313
- Time zone: UTC+3 (TRT)

Şeyhsadi is a village in the Amasya District, Amasya Province, Turkey. Its population is 313 (2021).
