= Tencerli, Göynücek =

Tencerli
- Village
- Location within Turkey
- Coordinates: 40°24′N 35°43′E
- Country: Turkey
- Province: Amasya
- District: Göynücek
- Population (2021): 176
- Time zone: UTC+3 (TRT)

Tencerli (also: Tencirli) is a village in the Göynücek District, Amasya Province, Turkey. Its population is 176 (2021).
