= Bayat, Amasya =

Bayat
- Village
- Location within Turkey
- Coordinates: 40.5203°N 36.2554°E
- Country: Turkey
- Province: Amasya
- District: Amasya
- Population (2021): 49
- Time zone: UTC+3 (TRT)

Bayat is a village in the Amasya District, Amasya Province, Turkey. Its population is 49 (2021).
