= Göçeri, Hamamözü =

Göçeri
- Village
- Location within Turkey
- Country: Turkey
- Province: Amasya
- District: Hamamözü
- Population (2021): 68
- Time zone: UTC+3 (TRT)

Göçeri is a Besleney Circassian village (köy) in the Hamamözü District, Amasya Province, Turkey. Its population is 68 (2021).
