= Kutu, Amasya =

Kutu
- Village
- Country: Turkey
- Province: Amasya
- District: Amasya
- Population (2021): 66
- Time zone: UTC+3 (TRT)

Kutu is a village in the Amasya District, Amasya Province, Turkey. Its population is 66 (2021).
