= Boyalı, Suluova =

Boyalı
- Village
- Location within Turkey
- Coordinates: 40.7829°N 35.8161°E
- Country: Turkey
- Province: Amasya
- District: Suluova
- Population (2021): 149
- Time zone: UTC+3 (TRT)

Boyalı is a village in the Suluova District, Amasya Province, Turkey. Its population is 149 (2021). The village is situated within the Black Sea region of Turkey, an area known for its fertile agricultural land and traditional rural settlements. Like many small villages in the province, Boyalı’s economy primarily relies on farming and animal husbandry. The surrounding district of Suluova is also recognized for sugar beet production, which plays a significant role in the local economy.
