= Yağcıabdal, Amasya =

Yağcıabdal
- Village
- Location within Turkey
- Country: Turkey
- Province: Amasya
- District: Amasya
- Population (2021): 403
- Time zone: UTC+3 (TRT)

Yağcıabdal is a village in the Amasya District, Amasya Province, Turkey. Its population is 403 (2021).
