= Şeyhoğlu, Göynücek =

Şeyhoğlu
- Village
- Location within Turkey
- Country: Turkey
- Province: Amasya
- District: Göynücek
- Population (2021): 93
- Time zone: UTC+3 (TRT)

Şeyhoğlu (also: Şıhoğlu) is a village in the Göynücek District, Amasya Province, Turkey. Its population is 93 (2021).
