= Halifeli, Amasya =

Halifeli
- Village
- Location within Turkey
- Coordinates: 40°35′N 36°08′E
- Country: Turkey
- Province: Amasya
- District: Amasya
- Population (2021): 205
- Time zone: UTC+3 (TRT)

Halifeli is a village in the Amasya District, Amasya Province, Turkey. Its population is 205 (2021).
