= Beşiktepe, Göynücek =

Beşiktepe
- Village
- Location within Turkey
- Coordinates: 40.3527°N 35.5672°E
- Country: Turkey
- Province: Amasya
- District: Göynücek
- Population (2021): 108
- Time zone: UTC+3 (TRT)

Beşiktepe is a village in the Göynücek District, of the Amasya Province, in Turkey. Its population is 108 (2021).
