= Omarca, Hamamözü =

Omarca
- Village
- Location within Turkey
- Coordinates: 40°48′N 35°05′E
- Country: Turkey
- Province: Amasya
- District: Hamamözü
- Population (2021): 62
- Time zone: UTC+3 (TRT)

Omarca (also: Umarca) is a village in the Hamamözü District, Amasya Province, Turkey. Its population is 62 (2021).
