= Tuzsuz, Amasya =

Tuzsuz
- Village
- Location within Turkey
- Coordinates: 40°30′N 35°39′E
- Country: Turkey
- Province: Amasya
- District: Amasya
- Population (2021): 182
- Time zone: UTC+3 (TRT)

Tuzsuz is a village in the Amasya District, Amasya Province, Turkey. Its population is 182 (2021).
