= Uygur, Amasya =

Uygur
- Village
- Location within Turkey
- Country: Turkey
- Province: Amasya
- District: Amasya
- Population (2021): 789
- Time zone: UTC+3 (TRT)

Uygur is a village in the Amasya District, Amasya Province, Turkey. Its population is 789 (2021). Before the 2013 reorganisation, it was a town (belde).
