= Bağlıca, Amasya =

Bağlıca
- Village
- Location within Turkey
- Coordinates: 40.6062°N 35.6851°E
- Country: Turkey
- Province: Amasya
- District: Amasya
- Population (2021): 387
- Time zone: UTC+3 (TRT)

Bağlıca is a village in the Amasya District, Amasya Province, Turkey. Its population is 387 (2021).
