= Pembeli, Göynücek =

Pembeli
- Village
- Location within Turkey
- Coordinates: 40°22′N 35°23′E
- Country: Turkey
- Province: Amasya
- District: Göynücek
- Population (2021): 76
- Time zone: UTC+3 (TRT)

Pembeli (also: Penpeli) is a village in the Göynücek District, Amasya Province, Turkey. Its population is 76 (2021).
