= Ayvalıpınar, Göynücek =

Ayvalıpınar
- Village
- Location within Turkey
- Coordinates: 40.44580°N 35.65927°E
- Country: Turkey
- Province: Amasya
- District: Göynücek
- Population (2021): 233
- Time zone: UTC+3 (TRT)

Ayvalıpınar is a village in the Göynücek District, Amasya Province, Turkey. Its population is 233 (2021).
