= Kulu, Suluova =

Kulu
- Village
- Location within Turkey
- Coordinates: 40.7483°N 35.5981°E
- Country: Turkey
- Province: Amasya
- District: Suluova
- Population (2021): 92
- Time zone: UTC+3 (TRT)

Kulu is a village in the Suluova District, Amasya Province, Turkey. Its population is 92 (2021).
