= Gölköy, Hamamözü =

Gölköy
- Village
- Location within Turkey
- Coordinates: 40.7612°N 35.0637°E
- Country: Turkey
- Province: Amasya
- District: Hamamözü
- Population (2021): 389
- Time zone: UTC+3 (TRT)

Gölköy is a village in the Hamamözü District, Amasya Province, Turkey. Its population is 389 (2021).
