= Kuyulu Kavaklı =

- Village
- Location within Turkey
- Country: Turkey
- Province: Amasya
- District: Göynücek
- Population (2021): 71
- Time zone: UTC+3 (TRT)

Kuyulu Kavaklı is a village in the Göynücek District, Amasya Province, Turkey. Its population is 71 (2021).
