= Kızılkışlacık, Amasya =

Kızılkışlacık
- Village
- Location within Turkey
- Coordinates: 40°46′N 36°03′E
- Country: Turkey
- Province: Amasya
- District: Amasya
- Population (2021): 518
- Time zone: UTC+3 (TRT)

Kızılkışlacık is a village in the Amasya District, Amasya Province, Turkey. Its population is 518 (2021).
