= Mağaraobruğu, Hamamözü =

Mağaraobruğu
- Village
- Location within Turkey
- Coordinates: 40°50′N 35°05′E
- Country: Turkey
- Province: Amasya
- District: Hamamözü
- Population (2021): 33
- Time zone: UTC+3 (TRT)

Mağaraobruğu is a village in the Hamamözü District, Amasya Province, Turkey. Its population is 33 (2021).
