= Küçükkızılca, Amasya =

Küçükkızılca
- Village
- Location within Turkey
- Country: Turkey
- Province: Amasya
- District: Amasya
- Population (2021): 263
- Time zone: UTC+3 (TRT)

Küçükkızılca is a village in the Amasya District, Amasya Province of Turkey. Its population was 263 as of 2021.
