= Kertme, Göynücek =

Kertme
- Village
- Location within Turkey
- Coordinates: 40.4577°N 35.4610°E
- Country: Turkey
- Province: Amasya
- District: Göynücek
- Population (2021): 82
- Time zone: UTC+3 (TRT)

Kertme is a village in the Göynücek District, Amasya Province, Turkey. Its population is 82 (2021).
