= Karayakup, Göynücek =

Karayakup
- Village
- Location within Turkey
- Coordinates: 40.3833°N 35.4751°E
- Country: Turkey
- Province: Amasya
- District: Göynücek
- Population (2021): 163
- Time zone: UTC+3 (TRT)

Karayakup is a village in the Göynücek District, Amasya Province, Turkey. Its population is 163 (2021).
