= Sarımeşe, Amasya =

Sarımeşe
- Village
- Country: Turkey
- Province: Amasya
- District: Amasya
- Population (2021): 506
- Time zone: UTC+3 (TRT)

Sarımeşe is a village in the Amasya District, Amasya Province, Turkey . Its population is 506 people at the 2021 census.
