= Salucu, Suluova =

Salucu
- Village
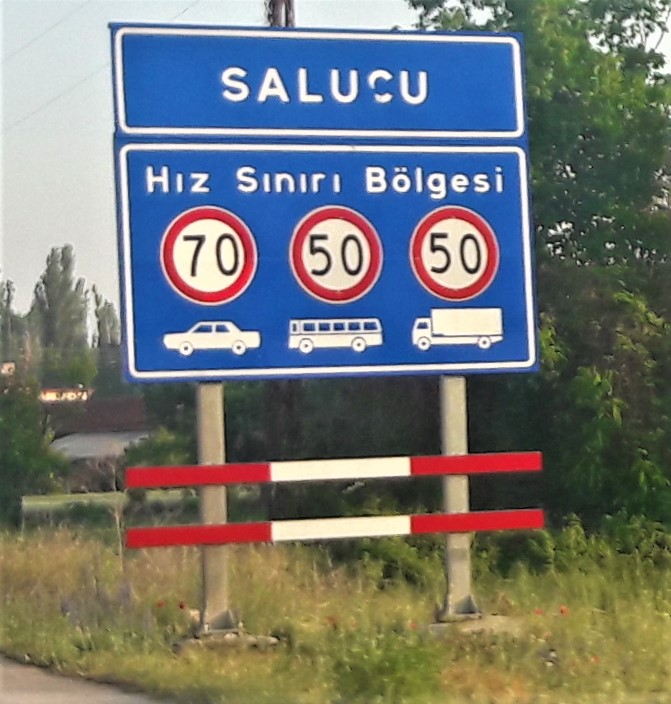

- Location within Turkey
- Coordinates: 40°47′N 35°41′E
- Country: Turkey
- Province: Amasya
- District: Suluova
- Population (2021): 328
- Time zone: UTC+3 (TRT)

Salucu is a village in the Suluova District, Amasya Province, Turkey. Its population is 328 (2021).
