= Yassıkışla, Göynücek =

Yassıkışla
- Village
- Location within Turkey
- Coordinates: 40°27′N 35°30′E
- Country: Turkey
- Province: Amasya
- District: Göynücek
- Population (2021): 73
- Time zone: UTC+3 (TRT)

Yassıkışla is a village in the Göynücek District, Amasya Province, Turkey. Its population is 73 (2021).
