= Hasanbey, Göynücek =

Hasanbey
- Village
- Location within Turkey
- Coordinates: 40.3861°N 35.5253°E
- Country: Turkey
- Province: Amasya
- District: Göynücek
- Population (2021): 101
- Time zone: UTC+3 (TRT)

Hasanbey is a village in the Göynücek District, Amasya Province, Turkey. Its population is 101 (2021).
