= Kuzalan, Suluova =

Kuzalan
- Village
- Location within Turkey
- Coordinates: 40.8540°N 35.8742°E
- Country: Turkey
- Province: Amasya
- District: Suluova
- Population (2021): 36
- Time zone: UTC+3 (TRT)

Kuzalan is a village in the Suluova District, Amasya Province, Turkey. Its population is 36 (2021).
