= Hıdırlar, Hamamözü =

Hıdırlar
- Village
- Location within Turkey
- Country: Turkey
- Province: Amasya
- District: Hamamözü
- Population (2021): 28
- Time zone: UTC+3 (TRT)

Hıdırlar is a village in the Hamamözü District, Amasya Province, Turkey. Its population is 28 (2021).
