= Çaykışla, Göynücek =

Çaykışla
- Village
- Location within Turkey
- Coordinates: 40°25′25″N 35°40′53″E
- Country: Turkey
- Province: Amasya
- District: Göynücek
- Population (2021): 98
- Time zone: UTC+3 (TRT)

Çaykışla is a village in the Göynücek District, Amasya Province, Turkey. Its population is 98 (2021).
