= Gürlü, Suluova =

Gürlü
- Village
- Location within Turkey
- Coordinates: 40°48′N 35°37′E
- Country: Turkey
- Province: Amasya
- District: Suluova
- Population (2021): 245
- Time zone: UTC+3 (TRT)

Gürlü (also: Cürlü) is a village in the Suluova District, Amasya Province, Turkey. Its population is 245 (2021).
