= Bayırlı, Suluova =

Bayırlı
- Village
- Location within Turkey
- Coordinates: 40.8414°N 35.7267°E
- Country: Turkey
- Province: Amasya
- District: Suluova
- Population (2021): 251
- Time zone: UTC+3 (TRT)

Bayırlı is a village in the Suluova District, Amasya Province, Turkey. Its population is 251 (2021).
