= İlyas, Amasya =

İlyas
- Village
- Location within Turkey
- Coordinates: 40.56154°N 35.83869°E
- Country: Turkey
- Province: Amasya
- District: Amasya
- Population (2021): 847
- Time zone: UTC+3 (TRT)

İlyas is a village in the Amasya District, Amasya Province, Turkey. Its population is 847 (2021).
