= Harmanağılı, Suluova =

Harmanağılı
- Village
- Location within Turkey
- Coordinates: 40°45′N 35°45′E
- Country: Turkey
- Province: Amasya
- District: Suluova
- Population (2021): 161
- Time zone: UTC+3 (TRT)

Harmanağılı is a village in the Suluova District, Amasya Province, Turkey. Its population is 161 (2021).
