= Çamurlu, Göynücek =

Çamurlu
- Village
- Location within Turkey
- Coordinates: 40.4255°N 35.4839°E
- Country: Turkey
- Province: Amasya
- District: Göynücek
- Population (2021): 14
- Time zone: UTC+3 (TRT)

Çamurlu is a village in the Göynücek District, Amasya Province, Turkey. Its population is 14 (2021).
