= Soku, Suluova =

Soku
- Village
- Location within Turkey
- Coordinates: 40.8593°N 35.8560°E
- Country: Turkey
- Province: Amasya
- District: Suluova
- Population (2021): 91
- Time zone: UTC+3 (TRT)

Soku is a village in the Suluova District, Amasya Province, Turkey. Its population is 91 (2021).
