= Sarıyar, Amasya =

Sarıyar
- Village
- Location within Turkey
- Coordinates: 40.6008°N 35.9961°E
- Country: Turkey
- Province: Amasya
- District: Amasya
- Population (2021): 287
- Time zone: UTC+3 (TRT)

Sarıyar is a village in the Amasya District, Amasya Province, Turkey. Its population is 287 (2021).
