= Kutlu, Suluova =

Kutlu
- Village
- Location within Turkey
- Coordinates: 40.8161°N 35.6780°E
- Country: Turkey
- Province: Amasya
- District: Suluova
- Population (2021): 18
- Time zone: UTC+3 (TRT)

Kutlu is a village in the Suluova District, Amasya Province, Turkey. Its population is 18 (2021).
