= Boğaköy, Amasya =

Boğaköy
- Village
- Location within Turkey
- Coordinates: 40.6381°N 35.7106°E
- Country: Turkey
- Province: Amasya
- District: Amasya
- Population (2021): 710
- Time zone: UTC+3 (TRT)

Boğaköy is a village in the Amasya District, Amasya Province, Turkey. Its population is 710 (2021).
