= Doğantepe, Amasya =

Doğantepe
- Village
- Location within Turkey
- Coordinates: 40°35′46″N 35°36′14″E
- Country: Turkey
- Province: Amasya
- District: Amasya
- Population (2021): 880
- Time zone: UTC+3 (TRT)

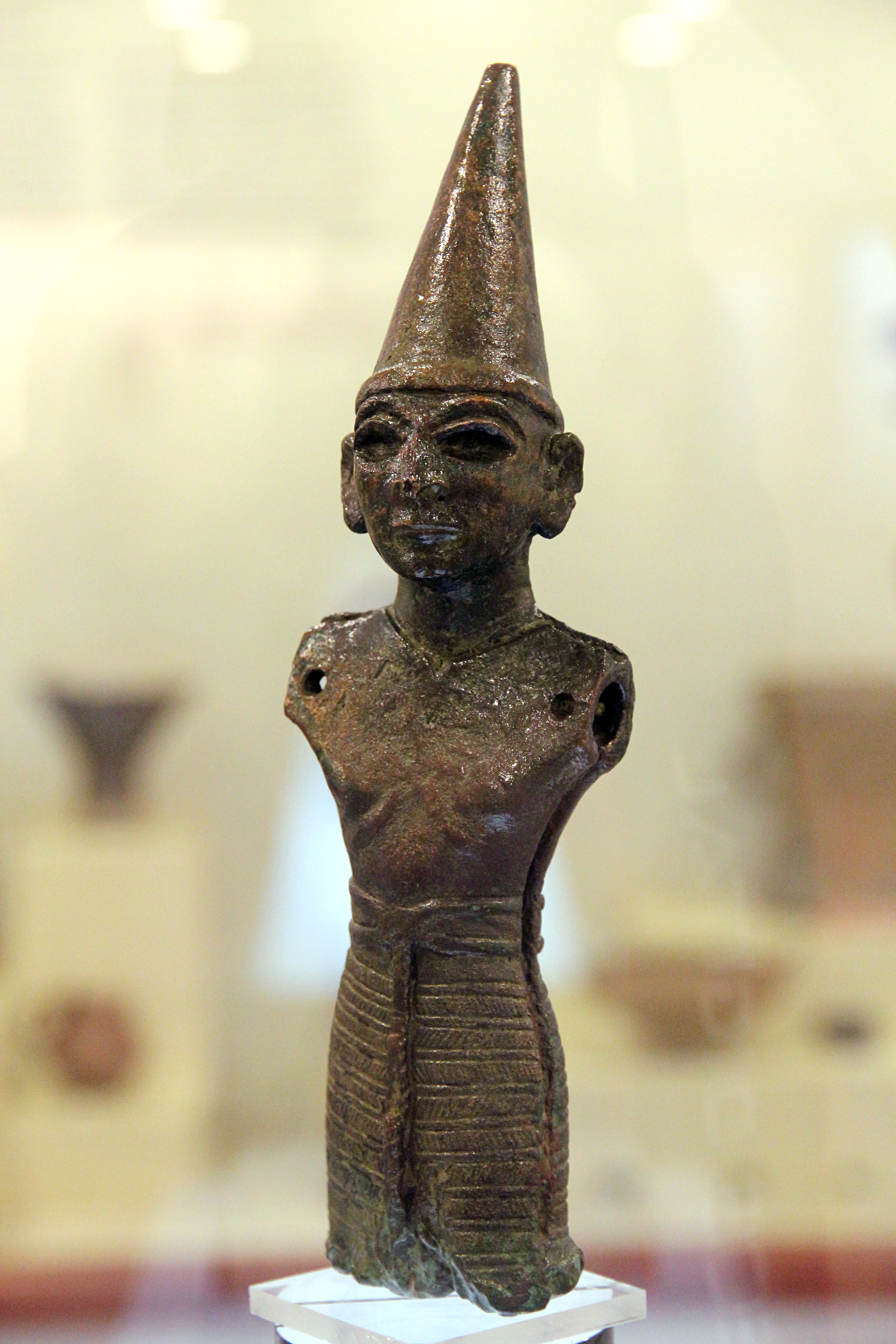
The Figurine of Amasya, a famous Late Bronze Age bronze statuette representing the Hittite storm god, Teshub displayed in the Archaeological Museum of Amasya, northern Turkey and found in Doğantepe.

Doğantepe is a village in the Amasya District, Amasya Province, Turkey. Its population is 880 (2021). Before the 2013 reorganisation, it was a town (belde).
