= Çayüstü, Suluova =

Çayüstü
- Village
- Location within Turkey
- Coordinates: 40.8086°N 35.6221°E
- Country: Turkey
- Province: Amasya
- District: Suluova
- Population (2021): 174
- Time zone: UTC+3 (TRT)

Çayüstü is a village in the Suluova District, Amasya Province, Turkey. Its population is 174 (2021).
