= Çulpara, Göynücek =

Çulpara
- Village
- Location within Turkey
- Coordinates: 40°30′N 35°32′E
- Country: Turkey
- Province: Amasya
- District: Göynücek
- Population (2021): 151
- Time zone: UTC+3 (TRT)

Çulpara is a village in the Göynücek District, Amasya Province, Turkey. Its population is 151 (2021).
