= Ortayazı, Suluova =

Ortayazı
- Village
- Location within Turkey
- Coordinates: 40.7829°N 35.6435°E
- Country: Turkey
- Province: Amasya
- District: Suluova
- Population (2021): 169
- Time zone: UTC+3 (TRT)

Ortayazı is a village in the Suluova District, Amasya Province, Turkey. Its population is 169 (2021).
