= Kervansaray, Göynücek =

Kervansaray
- Village
- Location within Turkey
- Coordinates: 40.3498°N 35.4892°E
- Country: Turkey
- Province: Amasya
- District: Göynücek
- Population (2021): 109
- Time zone: UTC+3 (TRT)

Kervansaray is a village in the Göynücek District, Amasya Province, Turkey. Its population is 109 (2021).
