= Armutlu, Suluova =

Armutlu
- Village
- Location within Turkey
- Coordinates: 40°53′21″N 35°38′33″E
- Country: Turkey
- Province: Amasya
- District: Suluova
- Population (2021): 495
- Time zone: UTC+3 (TRT)

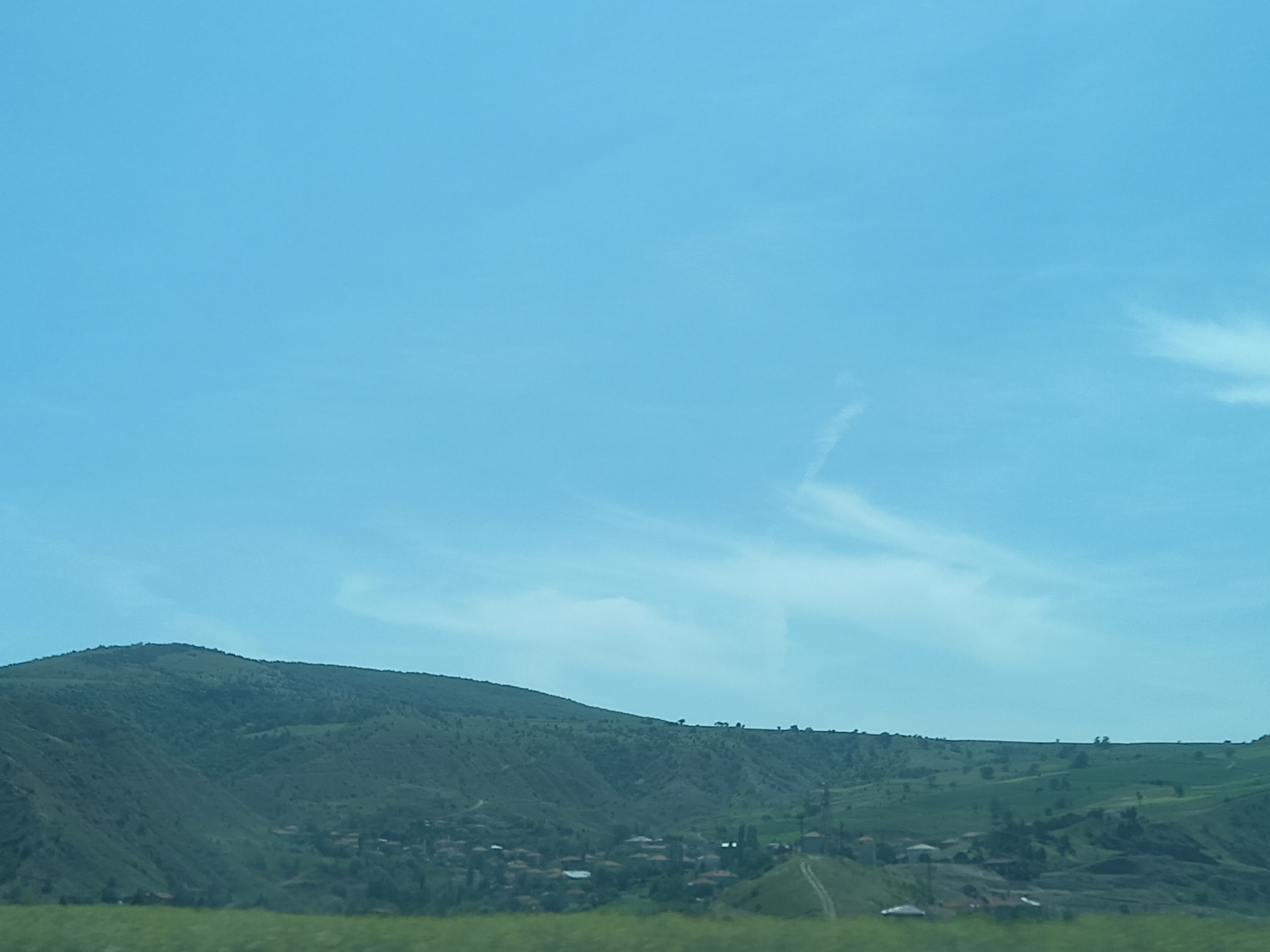
Afetevleri-Cebeci neighborhood of Armutlu, Suluova

Armutlu is a village in the Suluova District, Amasya Province, Turkey. Its population is 495 (2021).
