= Bağlarüstü, Amasya =

Bağlarüstü
- Village
- Location within Turkey
- Coordinates: 40°41′N 35°46′E
- Country: Turkey
- Province: Amasya
- District: Amasya
- Population (2021): 351
- Time zone: UTC+3 (TRT)

Bağlarüstü is a village in the Amasya District, Amasya Province, Turkey. Its population is 351 (2021).
