= Sevincer, Amasya =

Sevincer
- Village
- Location within Turkey
- Coordinates: 40°33′N 35°52′E
- Country: Turkey
- Province: Amasya
- District: Amasya
- Population (2021): 480
- Time zone: UTC+3 (TRT)

Sevincer is a village in the Amasya District, Amasya Province, Turkey. Its population is 480 (2021).
