= Beke, Amasya =

Beke
- Village
- Location within Turkey
- Coordinates: 40°35′N 35°29′E
- Country: Turkey
- Province: Amasya
- District: Amasya
- Population (2021): 146
- Time zone: UTC+3 (TRT)

Beke is a village in the Amasya District, Amasya Province, Turkey. Its population is 146 (2021).
