= Hamamözü =

- Municipality
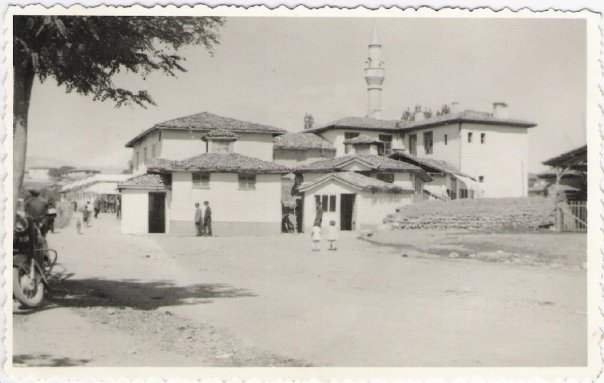
- Hamamözü in 1962

- Location within Turkey
- Coordinates: 40°47′N 35°02′E
- Country: Turkey
- Province: Amasya
- District: Hamamözü

Government
  - Mayor: Fatih Bayraktar (MHP)
- Elevation: 690 m (2,260 ft)
- Population (2021): 1,629
- Time zone: UTC+3 (TRT)
- Website: www.hamamozu.bel.tr

Hamamözü is a town in Amasya Province in the Black Sea region of Turkey. It is the seat of Hamamözü District. Its population is 1,629 (2021). The population has shrunk 13% since 1990. It has an average altitude of 690 meters. Its mayor is Fatih Bayraktar (MHP). The Arkut Bey hot spring in the district supplies spas.

== History ==
Hamamözü was founded as a village in 1887 when 60 households of Circassian immigrants purchased a nearby farm from the notables of the town of Gümüş.

== Climate ==
Hamamözü has a warm-summer Mediterranean climate (Köppen: Csb).

Climate data for Hamamözü
Month	Jan	Feb	Mar	Apr	May	Jun	Jul	Aug	Sep	Oct	Nov	Dec	Year
Daily mean °C (°F)	0.8 (33.4)	2.5 (36.5)	6.0 (42.8)	11.1 (52.0)	14.9 (58.8)	18.2 (64.8)	20.7 (69.3)	20.5 (68.9)	17.1 (62.8)	12.6 (54.7)	7.4 (45.3)	3.1 (37.6)	11.2 (52.2)
Average precipitation mm (inches)	42 (1.7)	32 (1.3)	38 (1.5)	48 (1.9)	60 (2.4)	49 (1.9)	19 (0.7)	15 (0.6)	24 (0.9)	32 (1.3)	36 (1.4)	47 (1.9)	442 (17.5)
Source: Climate-Data.org

== Places of interest ==
- The springs of Arkutbey, a popular place for walks and picnics as well as to drink and bathe in the healing mineral waters.

== Notable people ==
- Hamit Kaplan, wrestler and 1956 Summer Olympics gold medalist
- Adil Candemir, wrestler and 1948 Summer Olympics silver medalist
