= Yeşilöz, Amasya =

Yeşilöz
- Village
- Location within Turkey
- Coordinates: 40°32′36″N 36°09′11″E
- Country: Turkey
- Province: Amasya
- District: Amasya
- Population (2021): 202
- Time zone: UTC+3 (TRT)

Yeşilöz is a village in the Amasya District, Amasya Province, Turkey. Its population is 202 (2021).
