= Oğulbağı, Suluova =

Oğulbağı
- Village
- Location within Turkey
- Coordinates: 40°51′N 35°40′E
- Country: Turkey
- Province: Amasya
- District: Suluova
- Population (2021): 289
- Time zone: UTC+3 (TRT)

Oğulbağı is a village in the Suluova District, Amasya Province, Turkey. Its population is 289 (2021).
