= Küpeli, Suluova =

Küpeli
- Village
- Location within Turkey
- Coordinates: 40.7590°N 35.6592°E
- Country: Turkey
- Province: Amasya
- District: Suluova
- Population (2021): 40
- Time zone: UTC+3 (TRT)

Küpeli is a village in the Suluova District, Amasya Province, Turkey. Its population is 40 (2021).
