= Böke, Amasya =

Böke
- Village
- Location within Turkey
- Coordinates: 40.5493°N 36.2092°E
- Country: Turkey
- Province: Amasya
- District: Amasya
- Population (2021): 84
- Time zone: UTC+3 (TRT)

Böke is a village in the Amasya District, Amasya Province, Turkey. The population of this village is 84 (2021).
