= Ardıçlar, Amasya =

Ardıçlar
- Village
- Location within Turkey
- Coordinates: 40°32′N 35°56′E
- Country: Turkey
- Province: Amasya
- District: Amasya
- Population (2021): 216
- Time zone: UTC+3 (TRT)

Ardıçlar is a village in the Amasya District, Amasya Province, Turkey. Its population is 216 (2021).
