= Aşağıkarasu, Suluova =

Aşağıkarasu
- Village
- Location within Turkey
- Coordinates: 40.7484°N 35.6726°E
- Country: Turkey
- Province: Amasya
- District: Suluova
- Population (2021): 89
- Time zone: UTC+3 (TRT)

Aşağıkarasu is a village in the Suluova District, Amasya Province, Turkey. Its population is 89 (2021).
