= Kolay, Suluova =

Kolay
- Village
- Location within Turkey
- Coordinates: 40°50′N 35°41′E
- Country: Turkey
- Province: Amasya
- District: Suluova
- Population (2021): 415
- Time zone: UTC+3 (TRT)

Kolay is a village in the Suluova District, Amasya Province, Turkey. Its population is 415 (2021).
