= Ovasaray, Amasya =

Ovasaray
- Village
- Location within Turkey
- Coordinates: 40°32′N 35°44′E
- Country: Turkey
- Province: Amasya
- District: Amasya
- Population (2021): 417
- Time zone: UTC+3 (TRT)

Ovasaray is a village in the Amasya District, Amasya Province, Turkey. Its population is 417 (2021).

== History ==
The village has had the same name since 1928.

== Geography ==
The village is 14 miles, or 23 kilometers from Amasya city center.

== Population ==
Population by year
2022	397
2021	417
2020	440
2019	458
2018	479
2017	448
2016	454
2015	462
2014	459
2013	464
2012	494
2011	513
2010	544
2009	543
2008	544
2007	539
2000	740
1990	1.067
1985	1.067
