= Dedeköy, Hamamözü =

Dedeköy
- Village
- Location within Turkey
- Coordinates: 40°44′52″N 35°02′37″E
- Country: Turkey
- Province: Amasya
- District: Hamamözü
- Population (2021): 80
- Time zone: UTC+3 (TRT)

Dedeköy is a village in the Hamamözü District, Amasya Province, Turkey. Its population is 80 (2021).
