= Derebaşalan, Suluova =

Derebaşalan
- Village
- Location within Turkey
- Coordinates: 40°52′N 35°50′E
- Country: Turkey
- Province: Amasya
- District: Suluova
- Population (2021): 199
- Time zone: UTC+3 (TRT)

Derebaşalan is a village in the Suluova District, Amasya Province, Turkey. Its population is 199 (2021).
