= Yemişen, Hamamözü =

Yemişen
- Village
- Location within Turkey
- Coordinates: 40.7724°N 35.1344°E
- Country: Turkey
- Province: Amasya
- District: Hamamözü
- Population (2021): 115
- Time zone: UTC+3 (TRT)

Yemişen is a village in the Hamamözü District, Amasya Province, Turkey. Its population is 115 (2021).
