= Hasabdal, Amasya =

Hasabdal
- Village
- Location within Turkey
- Coordinates: 40°29′N 36°04′E
- Country: Turkey
- Province: Amasya
- District: Amasya
- Population (2021): 63
- Time zone: UTC+3 (TRT)

Hasabdal is a village in the Amasya District, Amasya Province, Turkey. Its population is 63 (2021).
