= Seyfe, Suluova =

Seyfe
- Village
- Location within Turkey
- Coordinates: 40.8408°N 35.8900°E
- Country: Turkey
- Province: Amasya
- District: Suluova
- Population (2021): 54
- Time zone: UTC+3 (TRT)

Seyfe is a village in the Suluova District, Amasya Province, Turkey. Its population is 54 (2021).
