= Yuvaköy, Amasya =

Yuvaköy
- Village
- Location within Turkey
- Coordinates: 40.6469°N 36.1553°E
- Country: Turkey
- Province: Amasya
- District: Amasya
- Population (2021): 180
- Time zone: UTC+3 (TRT)

Yuvaköy is a village in the Amasya District, Amasya Province, Turkey. Its population is 180 (2021).
