= Ziyaret, Amasya =

Ziyaret
- Municipality
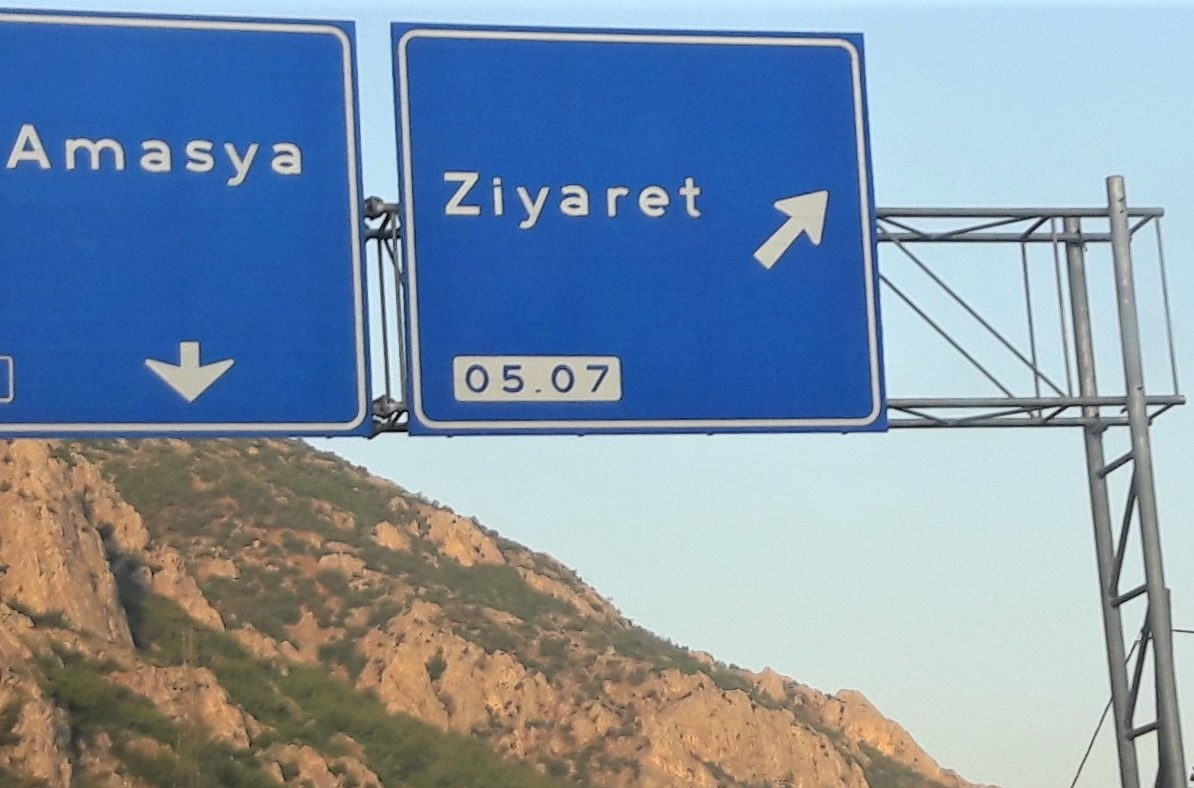

- Location within Turkey
- Coordinates: 40°41′6″N 35°52′8″E
- Country: Turkey
- Province: Amasya
- District: Amasya
- Population (2021): 4,084
- Time zone: UTC+3 (TRT)

Ziyaret is a town (belde) and municipality in the Amasya District, Amasya Province, Turkey. Its population is 4,084 (2021).
