= Deveci, Suluova =

Deveci
- Village
- Location within Turkey
- Country: Turkey
- Province: Amasya
- District: Suluova
- Population (2021): 193
- Time zone: UTC+3 (TRT)

Deveci is a village in the Suluova District, Amasya Province, Turkey. Its population is 193 (2021).
