= Sıracevizler, Amasya =

Sıracevizler
- Village
- Location within Turkey
- Coordinates: 40°39′N 35°38′E
- Country: Turkey
- Province: Amasya
- District: Amasya
- Population (2021): 174
- Time zone: UTC+3 (TRT)

Sıracevizler is a village in the Amasya District, Amasya Province, Turkey. Its population is 174 (2021).
