= Yukarıovacık, Hamamözü =

Yukarıovacık
- Village
- Location within Turkey
- Coordinates: 40.7952°N 35.1229°E
- Country: Turkey
- Province: Amasya
- District: Hamamözü
- Population (2021): 154
- Time zone: UTC+3 (TRT)

Yukarıovacık is a village in the Hamamözü District, Amasya Province, Turkey. Its population is 154 (2021).
