= Alabedir, Suluova =

Alabedir
- Village
- Location within Turkey
- Coordinates: 40°41′N 35°39′E
- Country: Turkey
- Province: Amasya
- District: Suluova
- Population (2021): 29
- Time zone: UTC+3 (TRT)

Alabedir is a village in the Suluova District, Amasya Province, Turkey. Its population is 29 (2021).
