= Dadıköy, Amasya =

Dadıköy
- Village
- Location within Turkey
- Coordinates: 40°33′N 35°47′E
- Country: Turkey
- Province: Amasya
- District: Amasya
- Population (2021): 260
- Time zone: UTC+3 (TRT)

Dadıköy (also: Dadı) is a village in the Amasya District, Amasya Province, Turkey. Its population is 260 (2021).
