= Ermiş, Amasya =

Ermiş
- Village
- Location within Turkey
- Coordinates: 40°38′N 35°52′E
- Country: Turkey
- Province: Amasya
- District: Amasya
- Population (2021): 371
- Time zone: UTC+3 (TRT)

Ermiş (formerly: Vermiş) is a village in the Amasya District, Amasya Province, Turkey. Its population is 371 (2021).
