= Konuralan, Göynücek =

Konuralan
- Village
- Location within Turkey
- Coordinates: 40°28′N 35°36′E
- Country: Turkey
- Province: Amasya
- District: Göynücek
- Population (2021): 83
- Time zone: UTC+3 (TRT)

Konuralan is a village in the Göynücek District, Amasya Province, Turkey. Its population is 83 (2021).
