= Kanatpınar, Suluova =

Kanatpınar
- Village
- Location within Turkey
- Coordinates: 40°42′N 35°34′E
- Country: Turkey
- Province: Amasya
- District: Suluova
- Population (2021): 78
- Time zone: UTC+3 (TRT)

Kanatpınar is a village in the Suluova District, Amasya Province, Turkey. Its population is 78 (2021).
