= Chrysiliou =

Chrysiliou: Χρυσηλιού (Greek); Yuvacık (Turkish)
- Location within Cyprus
- Coordinates: 35°12′54″N 33°01′08″E
- Country (de jure): Cyprus
  - District: Nicosia District
- Country (de facto): Northern Cyprus
  - District: Güzelyurt District

Government
  - Mukhtar: Hüseyin Terzioğlu

Population (2011)
  - Total: 214
- Time zone: UTC+2 (EET)
  - Summer (DST): UTC+3 (EEST)

Chrysiliou (Greek: Χρυσηλιού; Turkish: Yuvacık) is a small village in Cyprus, east of Morphou. De facto, it is under the control of Northern Cyprus. According to Cyprus Republic, is a quarter of Morphou.
