= Aydoğdu (surname) =

Aydoğdu is a Turkish surname. Notable people with the surname include:

- Abdullah Aydoğdu (born 1991), Turkish Paralympian goalball player
- Deniz Aydoğdu (born 1983), Turkish footballer
- Soner Aydoğdu (born 1991), Turkish footballer
