= Çengelkayı, Amasya =

Çengelkayı
- Village
- Location within Turkey
- Coordinates: 40°30′N 36°11′E
- Country: Turkey
- Province: Amasya
- District: Amasya
- Population (2021): 132
- Time zone: UTC+3 (TRT)

Çengelkayı is a village in the Amasya District, Amasya Province, Turkey. Its population is 132 (2021).
