= Koyuncu, Göynücek =

Koyuncu
- Village
- Location within Turkey
- Coordinates: 40.4776°N 35.5279°E
- Country: Turkey
- Province: Amasya
- District: Göynücek
- Population (2021): 45
- Time zone: UTC+3 (TRT)

Koyuncu is a village in the Göynücek District, Amasya Province, Turkey. Its population is 45 (2021).
