= Kızılca, Amasya =

Kızılca
- Village
- Location within Turkey
- Coordinates: 40°30′47″N 35°46′04″E
- Country: Turkey
- Province: Amasya
- District: Amasya
- Population (2021): 822
- Time zone: UTC+3 (TRT)

Kızılca (also: Büyükkızılca) is a village in the Amasya District, Amasya Province, Turkey. Its population is 822 (2021).
