= Arpadere, Hamamözü =

Arpadere
- Village
- Location within Turkey
- Coordinates: 40.8444°N 35.0499°E
- Country: Turkey
- Province: Amasya
- District: Hamamözü
- Population (2021): 136
- Time zone: UTC+3 (TRT)

Arpadere is a village in the Hamamözü District, Amasya Province, Turkey. Its population is 136 (2021).
