= Mahmatlar, Amasya =

Mahmatlar
- Village
- Location within Turkey
- Country: Turkey
- Province: Amasya
- District: Amasya
- Population (2021): 219
- Time zone: UTC+3 (TRT)

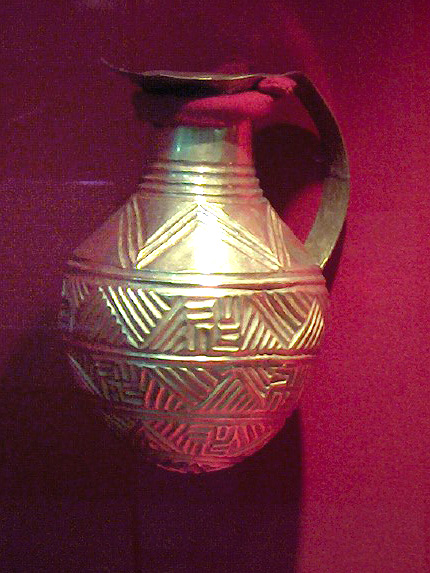
Gold jug; height : 17.8 cm; found in Mahmatlar; 2300-2000 BC; product of Hattian art; Museum of Anatolian Civilizations, Ankara, Turkey

Mahmatlar is a village in the Amasya District, Amasya Province, Turkey. Its population is 219 (2021).
