= Beldağı, Amasya =

Beldağı
- Village
- Location within Turkey
- Coordinates: 40°38′N 36°09′E
- Country: Turkey
- Province: Amasya
- District: Amasya
- Population (2021): 265
- Time zone: UTC+3 (TRT)

Beldağı is a village in the Amasya District, Amasya Province, Turkey. Es wurde 1886 gegründet. And it has Wind Turbine on top of the mountain. Its population is 269 (2023).

Highest Population was in 1975 with 985 people.
