= Davutevi, Göynücek =

Davutevi
- Village
- Location within Turkey
- Coordinates: 40°22′N 35°41′E
- Country: Turkey
- Province: Amasya
- District: Göynücek
- Population (2021): 42
- Time zone: UTC+3 (TRT)

Davutevi is a village in the Göynücek District, Amasya Province, Turkey. Its population is 42 (2021).
