= Karaşar, Göynücek =

Karaşar
- Village
- Location within Turkey
- Coordinates: 40.3414°N 35.3852°E
- Country: Turkey
- Province: Amasya
- District: Göynücek
- Population (2021): 356
- Time zone: UTC+3 (TRT)

Karaşar is a village in the Göynücek District, Amasya Province, Turkey. Its population is 356 (2021).
