= Ayrancı Dam =

Coordinates: 37.336°N 33.727°E

Ayranci Dam
- Interactive map of Ayranci Dam
- Location: Karaman, Turkey
- Construction began: 1956
- Opening date: 1958

Dam and spillways
- Type of dam: Earth fill dam
- Dam volume: 2 308 000 m³

Reservoir
- Total capacity: 28 000 000 m³

Ayrancı Dam is a dam in Karman, Turkey, built between 1956 and 1958. The irrigation area of the dam is 7,817 ha.

== See also ==
- List of dams and reservoirs in Turkey
