= Yüzbeyi, Suluova =

Yüzbeyi
- Village
- Location within Turkey
- Coordinates: 40.7299°N 35.7031°E
- Country: Turkey
- Province: Amasya
- District: Suluova
- Population (2021): 186
- Time zone: UTC+3 (TRT)

Yüzbeyi is a village in the Suluova District, Amasya Province, Turkey. Its population is 186 (2021).
