= Suluova =

- Municipality
- Location in Turkey
- Coordinates: 40°50′N 35°39′E
- Country: Turkey
- Province: Amasya
- District: Suluova

Government
  - Mayor: Fatih Üçok (AKP)
- Elevation: 510 m (1,670 ft)
- Population (2021): 39,286
- Time zone: UTC+3 (TRT)
- Website: www.suluova.bel.tr

Suluova is a town in Amasya Province of Turkey, located on high ground inland within the central Black Sea region. It is the seat of Suluova District. Its population is 39,286 (2021). Altitude is 510 m. The mayor is Fatih Üçok (AKP). Two-thirds of the district lies on the plain (watered by the Tersakan River), one-third in the surrounding mountain forest. The land is dry and strong winds whip over the mountains from the Black Sea so Suluova is notorious for its dust storms.

== Name ==
Suluova was known in antiquity as Arguma (Ancient Greek: Αργουμα, Argouma; Latin: Arguma), meaning 'watery'. Özhan Öztürk claims that Argoma means "border settlement/base" at Hittite-Kaskians border erha “border” + huma(ti) “base/settlement” while Bergama means "high settlement/base" in Hittite language This was later translated into Turkish first as Suluca and later as Suluova, meaning watery plain.

== Climate ==
Suluova has a warm-summer Mediterranean climate (Köppen: Csb).

Climate data for Suluova
Month	Jan	Feb	Mar	Apr	May	Jun	Jul	Aug	Sep	Oct	Nov	Dec	Year
Daily mean °C (°F)	1.6 (34.9)	3.3 (37.9)	6.8 (44.2)	11.8 (53.2)	15.7 (60.3)	19.1 (66.4)	21.2 (70.2)	21.3 (70.3)	17.9 (64.2)	13.3 (55.9)	8.4 (47.1)	3.9 (39.0)	12.0 (53.6)
Average precipitation mm (inches)	42 (1.7)	31 (1.2)	37 (1.5)	50 (2.0)	55 (2.2)	44 (1.7)	19 (0.7)	12 (0.5)	22 (0.9)	33 (1.3)	36 (1.4)	45 (1.8)	426 (16.9)
Source: Climate-Data.org

== History ==
Excavations of the hill of Kümbettepe show the history of Suluova goes back to 2000 BC, the Stone Age. The area was then settled by the Hittites.

The Seljuk Turks arrived in the 11th century AD and the area was brought within the Ottoman Empire in 1386.

== Suluova today ==
Suluova has grown into a large town for four reasons: the area is a rich source of lignite coal, this is good farmland and in particular Turkey's largest growers of onions are located here, there is a sugar factory located there, and a railway line passes through the town.
