= Sığırçayı, Göynücek =

Sığırçayı
- Village
- Location within Turkey
- Coordinates: 40°22′N 35°34′E
- Country: Turkey
- Province: Amasya
- District: Göynücek
- Population (2021): 115
- Time zone: UTC+3 (TRT)

Sığırçayı is a village in the Göynücek District, Amasya Province, Turkey. Its population is 115 (2021).
