= Şarklı, Göynücek =

Şarklı
- Village
- Location within Turkey
- Coordinates: 40.4710°N 35.5582°E
- Country: Turkey
- Province: Amasya
- District: Göynücek
- Population (2021): 167
- Time zone: UTC+3 (TRT)

Şarklı is a village in the Göynücek District, Amasya Province, Turkey. Its population is 167 (2021).
