= Ardıçpınar, Göynücek =

Ardıçpınar
- Village
- Location within Turkey
- Coordinates: 40.3522°N 35.6397°E
- Country: Turkey
- Province: Amasya
- District: Göynücek
- Population (2021): 62
- Time zone: UTC+3 (TRT)

Ardıçpınar is a village in the Göynücek District, Amasya Province, Turkey. Its population was 64 in 2022; an increase from 62 (2021).
