= Soma, Amasya =

Soma
- Village
- Location within Turkey
- Coordinates: 40°40′N 35°35′E
- Country: Turkey
- Province: Amasya
- District: Amasya
- Population (2021): 119
- Time zone: UTC+3 (TRT)

Soma (formerly: Tuzluçal) is a village in the Amasya District, Amasya Province, Turkey. Its population is 119 (2021).
