= İpekköy, Amasya =

İpekköy
- Village
- Location within Turkey
- Coordinates: 40°36′N 35°48′E
- Country: Turkey
- Province: Amasya
- District: Amasya
- Population (2021): 569
- Time zone: UTC+3 (TRT)

İpekköy is a village in the Amasya District, Amasya Province, Turkey. Its population is 569 (2021).
