= Tepeköy, Hamamözü =

Tepeköy
- Village
- Location within Turkey
- Country: Turkey
- Province: Amasya
- District: Hamamözü
- Population (2021): 26
- Time zone: UTC+3 (TRT)

Tepeköy is a village in the Hamamözü District, Amasya Province, Turkey. Its population is 26 (2021).
