= Avşar, Amasya =

Avşar
- Village
- Location within Turkey
- Coordinates: 40.5907°N 36.1906°E
- Country: Turkey
- Province: Amasya
- District: Amasya
- Population (2021): 226
- Time zone: UTC+3 (TRT)

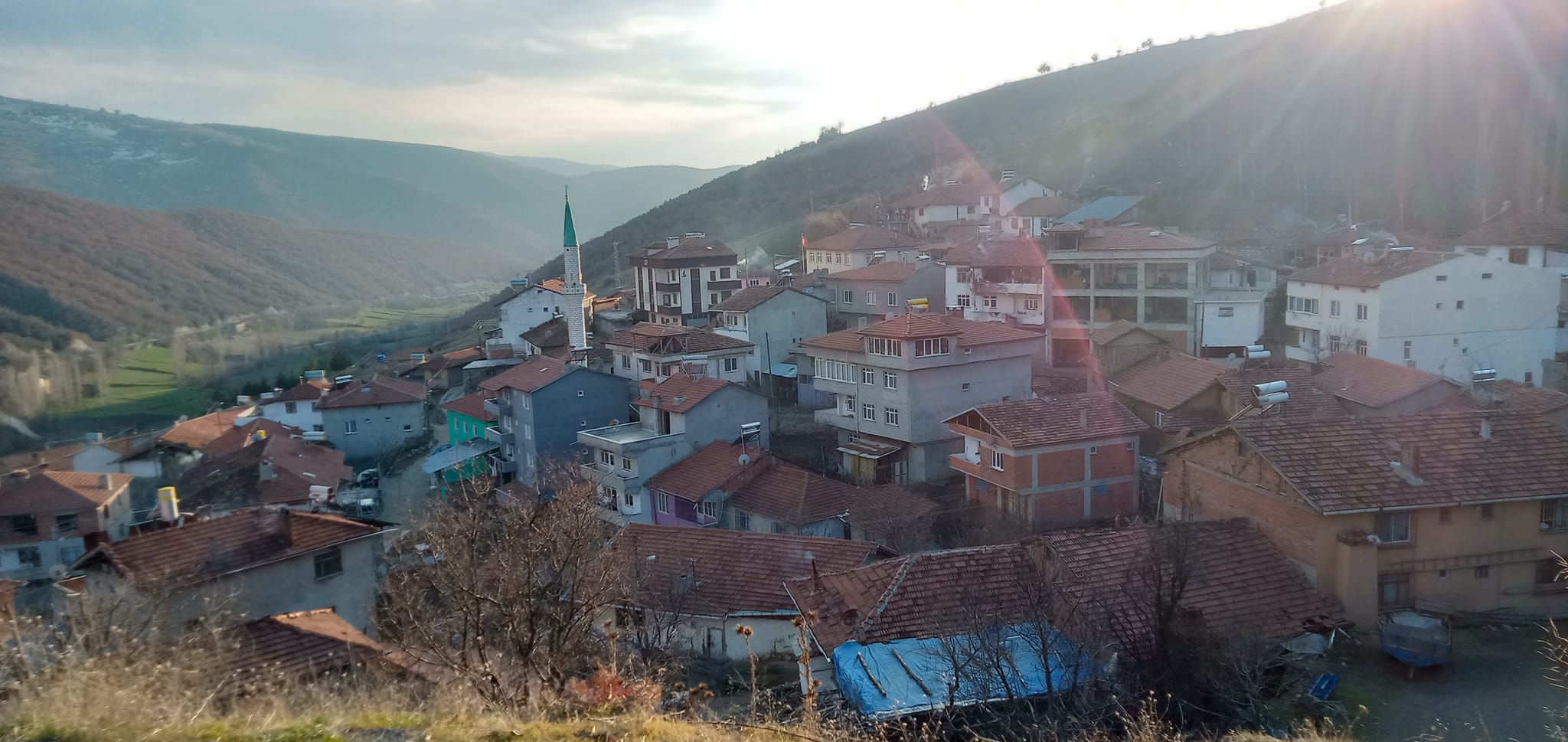
Avşar, Amasya

Avşar is a village in the Amasya District, Amasya Province, Turkey. Its population is 226 (2021).
