= Kayacık, Amasya =

Kayacık
- Village
- Location within Turkey
- Country: Turkey
- Province: Amasya
- District: Amasya
- Population (2021): 192
- Time zone: UTC+3 (TRT)

Kayacık is a village in the Amasya District, Amasya Province, Turkey. Its population is 192 (2021).
