= Çayköy, Hamamözü =

Çayköy
- Village
- Location within Turkey
- Coordinates: 40.7757°N 35.0683°E
- Country: Turkey
- Province: Amasya
- District: Hamamözü
- Population (2021): 114
- Time zone: UTC+3 (TRT)

Çayköy is a village in the Hamamözü District, Amasya Province, Turkey. Its population is 114 (2021).
