= Abacı, Amasya =

Abacı
- Village
- Location within Turkey
- Coordinates: 40.6467°N 36.0453°E
- Country: Turkey
- Province: Amasya
- District: Amasya
- Population (2021): 458
- Time zone: UTC+3 (TRT)

Abacı is a village in the Amasya District, Amasya Province, in northern Turkey. Its population is 458 (2021).

== Demographics ==
In 2012 the village had a population of 526 people. It has a declining population. In 1985 it had 1041 people, and in 2000 it had 728.
