= Aydoğdu, Amasya =

Aydoğdu
- Village
- Location within Turkey
- Coordinates: 40.587369°N 35.738483°E
- Country: Turkey
- Province: Amasya
- District: Amasya
- Population (2021): 60
- Time zone: UTC+3 (TRT)

Aydoğdu is a village in the Amasya District, Amasya Province of Turkey. Its population was 60 in 2021.
