= Ortaköy, Amasya =

Ortaköy
- Village
- Location within Turkey
- Country: Turkey
- Province: Amasya
- District: Amasya
- Population (2021): 153
- Time zone: UTC+3 (TRT)

Ortaköy is a village in the Amasya District, Amasya Province, Turkey. Its population is 153 (2021).
