= Yolpınar, Suluova =

Yolpınar
- Village
- Location within Turkey
- Coordinates: 40.7626°N 35.7530°E
- Country: Turkey
- Province: Amasya
- District: Suluova
- Population (2021): 223
- Time zone: UTC+3 (TRT)

Yolpınar is a village in the Suluova District, Amasya Province, Turkey. Its population is 223 (2021).
