= Şeyhler, Göynücek =

Şeyhler
- Village
- Location within Turkey
- Coordinates: 40.4265°N 35.5798°E
- Country: Turkey
- Province: Amasya
- District: Göynücek
- Population (2021): 79
- Time zone: UTC+3 (TRT)

Şeyhler (also: Şıhlar) is a village in the Göynücek District, Amasya Province, Turkey. Its population is 79 (2021).
