= İbecik, Amasya =

İbecik
- Village
- Location within Turkey
- Coordinates: 40.5119°N 36.035°E
- Country: Turkey
- Province: Amasya
- District: Amasya
- Population (2021): 280
- Time zone: UTC+3 (TRT)

İbecik is a village in the Amasya District, Amasya Province, Turkey. Its population is 280 (2021).
