= İlgazi, Amasya =

İlgazi
- Village
- Location within Turkey
- Coordinates: 40.63081°N 35.53608°E
- Country: Turkey
- Province: Amasya
- District: Amasya
- Population (2021): 173
- Time zone: UTC+3 (TRT)

İlgazi is a village in the Amasya District, Amasya Province, Turkey. Its population is 173 (2021).
