= Duruca, Amasya =

Duruca
- Village
- Location within Turkey
- Coordinates: 40°44′1″N 35°47′13″E
- Country: Turkey
- Province: Amasya
- District: Amasya
- Population (2021): 272
- Time zone: UTC+3 (TRT)

Duruca is a village in the Amasya District, Amasya Province, Turkey. Its population is 272 (2021).
