= Oluz, Amasya =

Oluz
- Village
- Location within Turkey
- Coordinates: 40°31′57″N 35°34′14″E
- Country: Turkey
- Province: Amasya
- District: Amasya
- Population (2021): 559
- Time zone: UTC+3 (TRT)

Oluz (formerly: Toklucak) is a village in the Amasya District, Amasya Province, Turkey. Its population is 559 (2021).
