= Göynücek =

- Municipality
- Location in Turkey
- Coordinates: 40°23′N 35°31′E
- Country: Turkey
- Province: Amasya
- District: Göynücek

Government
  - Mayor: Kadir Fatih Erdoğan (MHP)
- Population (2021): 4,938
- Time zone: UTC+3 (TRT)
- Website: www.goynucek.bel.tr

Göynücek is a town in Amasya Province, lying just to the north of central Turkey. It is the seat of Göynücek District. Its population is 4,938 (2021). Göynücek sits in the valley of the river Çekerek. The mayor is Kadir Fatih Erdoğan (MHP).

== Climate ==
Göynücek has a hot-summer Mediterranean climate (Köppen: Csa).

Climate data for Göynücek
Month	Jan	Feb	Mar	Apr	May	Jun	Jul	Aug	Sep	Oct	Nov	Dec	Year
Daily mean °C (°F)	1.9 (35.4)	3.7 (38.7)	7.8 (46.0)	12.7 (54.9)	16.6 (61.9)	19.9 (67.8)	22.4 (72.3)	22.5 (72.5)	18.8 (65.8)	13.8 (56.8)	8.8 (47.8)	4.5 (40.1)	12.8 (55.0)
Average precipitation mm (inches)	44 (1.7)	34 (1.3)	38 (1.5)	50 (2.0)	51 (2.0)	38 (1.5)	15 (0.6)	8 (0.3)	18 (0.7)	29 (1.1)	35 (1.4)	47 (1.9)	407 (16)
Source: Climate-Data.org
