= Gümüştepe, Merzifon =

Gümüştepe
- Village
- Location within Turkey
- Coordinates: 40.6849°N 35.4961°E
- Country: Turkey
- Province: Amasya
- District: Merzifon
- Population (2021): 201
- Time zone: UTC+3 (TRT)

Gümüştepe is a village in the Merzifon District, Amasya Province, Turkey. Its population is 201 (2021).
