= Yavru, Amasya =

Yavru
- Village
- Location within Turkey
- Coordinates: 40°40′N 35°46′E
- Country: Turkey
- Province: Amasya
- District: Amasya
- Population (2021): 67
- Time zone: UTC+3 (TRT)

Yavru is a village in the Amasya District, Amasya Province, Turkey. Its population is 67 (2021).
