= Ayrancı, Suluova =

Ayrancı
- Village
- Location within Turkey
- Coordinates: 40.75940°N 35.64498°E
- Country: Turkey
- Province: Amasya
- District: Suluova
- Population (2021): 185
- Time zone: UTC+3 (TRT)

Ayrancı is a village in the Suluova District, Amasya Province, Turkey. Its population is 185 (2021).
