= Yuvacık, Amasya =

Yuvacık
- Village
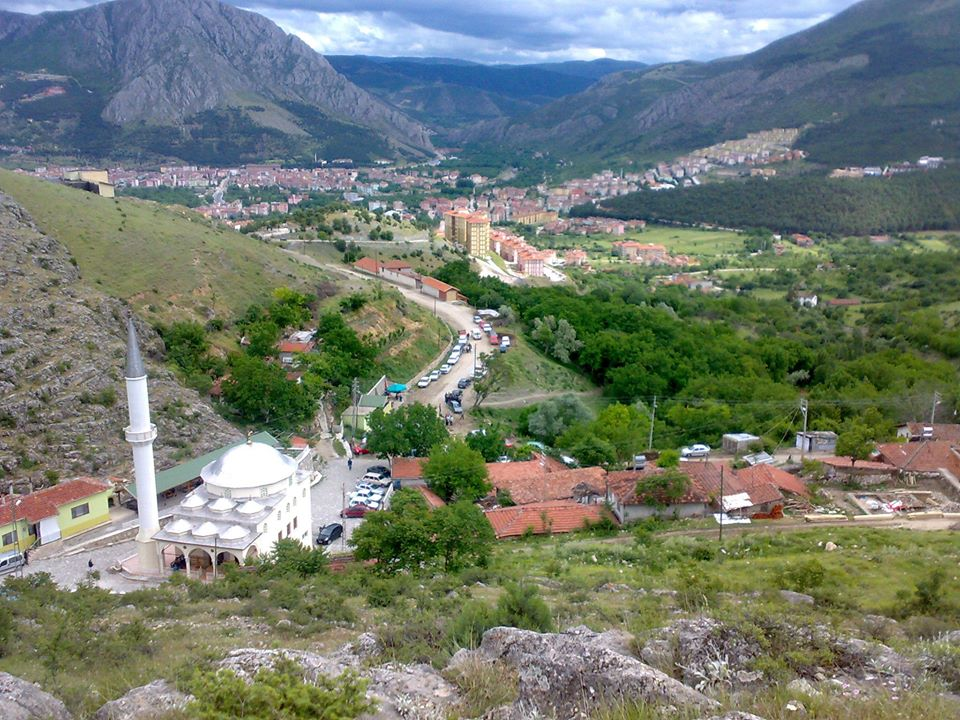
- View of the village

- Location within Turkey
- Coordinates: 40.6656°N 35.7897°E
- Country: Turkey
- Province: Amasya
- District: Amasya
- Population (2021): 45
- Time zone: UTC+3 (TRT)

Yuvacık is a village in the Amasya District, Amasya Province, Turkey. Its population is 45 (2021).
