= Karaçavuş, Amasya =

Karaçavuş
- Village
- Location within Turkey
- Country: Turkey
- Province: Amasya
- District: Amasya
- Population (2021): 71
- Time zone: UTC+3 (TRT)

Karaçavuş is a village in the Amasya District, Amasya Province, Turkey. Its population is 71 (2021).
