= Kayabaşı, Amasya =

Kayabaşı
- Village
- Location within Turkey
- Country: Turkey
- Province: Amasya
- District: Amasya
- Population (2021): 617
- Time zone: UTC+3 (TRT)

Kayabaşı is a village in the Amasya District, Amasya Province, Turkey. Its population is 617 (2021).
