= Karaali, Gümüşhacıköy =

Karaali
- Village
- Location within Turkey
- Coordinates: 40.8249°N 35.1478°E
- Country: Turkey
- Province: Amasya
- District: Gümüşhacıköy
- Population (2021): 26
- Time zone: UTC+3 (TRT)

Karaali is a village in the Gümüşhacıköy District, Amasya Province, Turkey. Its population is 26 (2021).
