= Aydınlık, Amasya =

Aydınlık
- Village
- Location within Turkey
- Coordinates: 40.7312°N 35.8368°E
- Country: Turkey
- Province: Amasya
- District: Amasya
- Population (2021): 731
- Time zone: UTC+3 (TRT)

Aydınlık is a village in the Amasya District, Amasya Province, Turkey. Its population is 731 (2021).
