= Sarıalan, Amasya =

Sarıalan
- Village
- Location within Turkey
- Coordinates: 40.5155°N 36.2275°E
- Country: Turkey
- Province: Amasya
- District: Amasya
- Population (2021): 311
- Time zone: UTC+3 (TRT)

Sarıalan is a village in the Amasya District, Amasya Province, Turkey. Its population is 311 (2021).
