= Alan, Göynücek =

Alan
- Village
- Location within Turkey
- Coordinates: 40.2500°N 35.4167°E
- Country: Turkey
- Province: Amasya
- District: Göynücek
- Population (2021): 368
- Time zone: UTC+3 (TRT)

Alan (also: Alanköy) is a village in the Göynücek District, Amasya Province, Turkey. Its population is 368 (2021).
