= Ilısu, Göynücek =

Ilısu
- Village
- Location within Turkey
- Coordinates: 40.3353°N 35.4735°E
- Country: Turkey
- Province: Amasya
- District: Göynücek
- Population (2021): 326
- Time zone: UTC+3 (TRT)

Ilısu is a village in the Göynücek District, Amasya Province, Turkey. Its population is 326 (2021).
