= Alanköy, Hamamözü =

Alanköy
- Village
- Location within Turkey
- Coordinates: 40.8683°N 35.0436°E
- Country: Turkey
- Province: Amasya
- District: Hamamözü
- Population (2021): 195
- Time zone: UTC+3 (TRT)

Alanköy is a village in the Hamamözü District, Amasya Province, Turkey. Its population is 195 (2021).
