= Musaköy, Amasya =

Musaköy
- Village
- Location within Turkey
- Coordinates: 40.4702°N 35.7454°E
- Country: Turkey
- Province: Amasya
- District: Amasya
- Population (2021): 352
- Time zone: UTC+3 (TRT)

Musaköy is a village in the Amasya District, Amasya Province, Turkey. Its population is 352 (2021).
