= ACMA =

ACMA or Acma may refer to:

- Academy of Country Music Awards, an American country music award show
- Açma, Gölyaka, a village in Turkey
- Advisory Council for Multicultural Affairs, an Australian government agency around 1989
- American Composites Manufacturers Association, the trade association for composites manufacturers in the US
- Arts & Communication Magnet Academy, a middle and high school in Beaverton, Oregon
- Associate Chartered Management Accountant, a designation used by associate members of the Chartered Institute of Management Accountants, a UK-based professional body
- Ateliers de construction de motocycles et d'automobiles, a French builder of motorcycles, scooters and micro-cars
- Australasian Computer Music Association, a non-profit Australia and New Zealand based organisation which aims to promote electroacoustic and computer music
- Australian Communications and Media Authority, the Australian government regulation agency for broadcasting, radio communications and telecommunications
- Automotive Component Manufacturers Association of India, organisation representing manufacturers in the Indian auto component industry
