= Yeşilören =

Yeşilören can refer to:

- Yeşilören, Kurşunlu
- Yeşilören, Merzifon
