= 19 Mayıs Tunnel =

Highway tunnel in Turkey

19 Mayıs Tunnel 19 Mayıs Tüneli
- Interactive map of 19 Mayıs Tunnel; 19 Mayıs Tüneli

Overview
- Location: Havza, Samsun Province
- Coordinates: 40°55′13″N 35°38′35″E Location of 19 Mayıs Tunnel in Turkey
- Status: Operational
- Route: D.795 E95

Operation
- Work began: 2005
- Constructed: Fermanoğlu Construction Company
- Opened: February 15, 2009; 17 years ago
- Operator: General Directorate of Highways
- Traffic: automotive

Technical
- Length: 280 and 260 m (920 and 850 ft)
- No. of lanes: 2 x 2
- Operating speed: 80 km/h (50 mph)

19 Mayıs Tunnel (Turkish: 19 Mayıs Tüneli), is a highway tunnel constructed on the Samsun-Çorum highway D.795 E95 in Samsun Province, northern Turkey.

It is situated near Paşapınarı village of Havza, Samsun. The 280 and 260 m (920 and 850 ft)-long twin-tube tunnel carrying two lanes of traffic in each direction is flanked by 845–923 m (2,772–3,028 ft)-long Havza Tunnel in the north and 392–392 m (1,286–1,286 ft)-long Şehzadeler Tunnel in the south on the same highway.

The tunnel was opened to traffic on February 15, 2009 by Turkish Prime Minister Recep Tayyip Erdoğan.
