= Çiyni =

Çiyni or Chiyni may refer to:

- Çiyni, Agsu, Azerbaijan
- Çiyni (40° 27' N 47° 47' E), Ujar, Azerbaijan
- Çiyni (40° 32' N 47° 35' E), Ujar, Azerbaijan
- Çiyni, Kurşunlu
