= Çavundur =

Çavundur may refer to:

- Çavundur, Kastamonu
- Çavundur, Kurşunlu
- Çavundur, Lice
- Çavundur, Merzifon
