= Hacıyakup =

Hacıyakup can refer to the following villages in Turkey:

- Hacıyakup, Gölyaka
- Hacıyakup, Manyas
- Hacıyakup, Merzifon
