= Osmanoğlu =

Osmanoğlu may refer to

- Osmanoğlu, Merzifon, village in the Amasya Province of Turkey
- Osmanoğlu family, current members of the historical House of Osman

Osmanoğlu is the name of

- Şeref Osmanoğlu (born 1989), Turkish triple jumper of Ukrainian descent

Osmanoğlu is a surname.
