= Dumanlı (disambiguation) =

Dumanlı can refer to:

- Dumanlı
- Dumanlı, Gümüşhacıköy
- Dumanlı, Kurşunlu
- Dumanlı, Lapseki
- Celal Dumanlı (born 1994), Turkish footballer
