= Havza Tunnel =

Road tunnel in Turkey

Havza Tunnel Havza Tüneli
- Interactive map of Havza Tunnel; Havza Tüneli

Overview
- Location: Havza, Samsun Province
- Coordinates: 40°55′57″N 35°39′11″E Location of Havza Tunnel in Turkey
- Status: Operational
- Route: D.795, E.95

Operation
- Work began: 2005
- Constructed: Fermanoğlu Construction Company
- Opened: 15 February 2009; 17 years ago
- Operator: General Directorate of Highways
- Traffic: automotive

Technical
- Length: 845 and 923 m (2,772 and 3,028 ft)
- No. of lanes: 2 x 2
- Operating speed: 80 km/h (50 mph)

The Havza Tunnel (Turkish: Havza Tüneli) is a highway tunnel constructed on the Samsun-Çorum highway D.795 - E.95 in Samsun Province, northern Turkey.

It is situated near the Paşapınarı village of Havza, Samsun. The 845 and 923 m (2,772 and 3,028 ft)-long twin-tube tunnel carries two lanes of traffic in each direction. The 19 Mayıs Tunnel follows the Havza Tunnel towards Çorum.

The tunnel was opened to traffic on 15 February 2009 by Turkish Prime Minister Recep Tayyip Erdoğan.
