= Güzeldere =

Güzeldere can refer to:

- Güzeldere, Gölyaka
- Güzeldere, Hınıs
