= Hırka =

Hırka can refer to:

- Hırka, Merzifon
- Hırka, Tavas
- Hırka-i Şerif Mosque
