= Şehzadeler Tunnel =

Highway tunnel in Turkey

Şehzadeler Tunnel Şehzadeler Tüneli
- Interactive map of Şehzadeler Tunnel; Şehzadeler Tüneli

Overview
- Location: Merzifon, Amasya Province
- Coordinates: 40°54′09″N 35°38′05″E Location of Şehzadeler Tunnel in Turkey
- Status: Operational
- Route: D.795 E95

Operation
- Work began: 2005
- Constructed: Fermanoğlu Construction Company
- Opened: 15 February 2009; 17 years ago
- Operator: General Directorate of Highways
- Traffic: automotive

Technical
- Length: 392 and 392 m (1,286 and 1,286 ft)
- No. of lanes: 2 x 2
- Operating speed: 80 km/h (50 mph)

Şehzadeler Tunnel (Turkish: Şehzadeler Tüneli), is a highway tunnel constructed on the Samsun-Çorum highway D.795 E95 in Amasya Province, northern Turkey.

It is situated near Bayat village of Merzifon, Amasya. The 392 and 392 m (1,286 and 1,286 ft)-long twin-tube tunnel carrying two lanes of traffic in each direction. The 19 Mayıs Tunnel follows the Şehzadeler Tunnel in direction Samsun.

The tunnel was opened to traffic on 15 February 2009 by Turkish Prime Minister Recep Tayyip Erdoğan.
