= Hacımuslu =

Hacımuslu can refer to:

- Hacımuslu, Kurşunlu
- Hacımuslu, Polatlı
