= Oymaağaç, Merzifon =

Oymaağaç
- Village
- Location within Turkey
- Coordinates: 40.6720°N 35.3819°E
- Country: Turkey
- Province: Amasya
- District: Merzifon
- Population (2021): 117
- Time zone: UTC+3 (TRT)

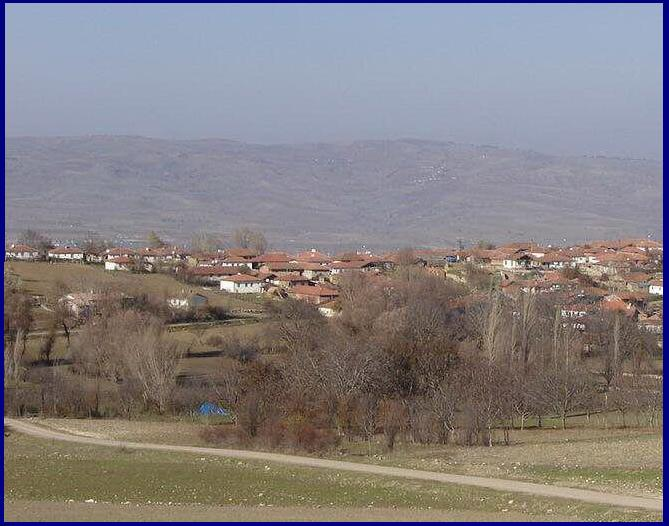

Oymaağaç is a village in the Merzifon District, Amasya Province, Turkey. Its population is 117 (2021).
