= Demirciören, Kurşunlu =

Village in Turkey

Demirciören
- Village
- Location in Turkey Demirciören (Turkey Central Anatolia)
- Coordinates: 40.7382°N 33.213°E
- Country: Turkey
- Province: Çankırı
- District: Kurşunlu
- Population (2021): 74
- Time zone: UTC+3 (TRT)

Demirciören is a village in the Kurşunlu District of Çankırı Province in Turkey. Its population is 74 (2021).
