= Yeşiltepe, Merzifon =

Yeşiltepe
- Village
- Location within Turkey
- Country: Turkey
- Province: Amasya
- District: Merzifon
- Population (2021): 38
- Time zone: UTC+3 (TRT)

Yeşiltepe is a village in the Merzifon District, Amasya Province, Turkey. Its population is 38 (2021). In 2005 it passed from the Amasya District to the Merzifon District.
