= Çaylıca, Kurşunlu =

Village in Turkey

Çaylıca
- Village
- Country: Turkey
- Province: Çankırı
- District: Kurşunlu
- Population (2021): 108
- Time zone: UTC+3 (TRT)

Çaylıca is a village in the Kurşunlu District of Çankırı Province in Turkey. Its population is 108 (2021).
