= Merzifon District =

District of Amasya Province, Turkey

- District
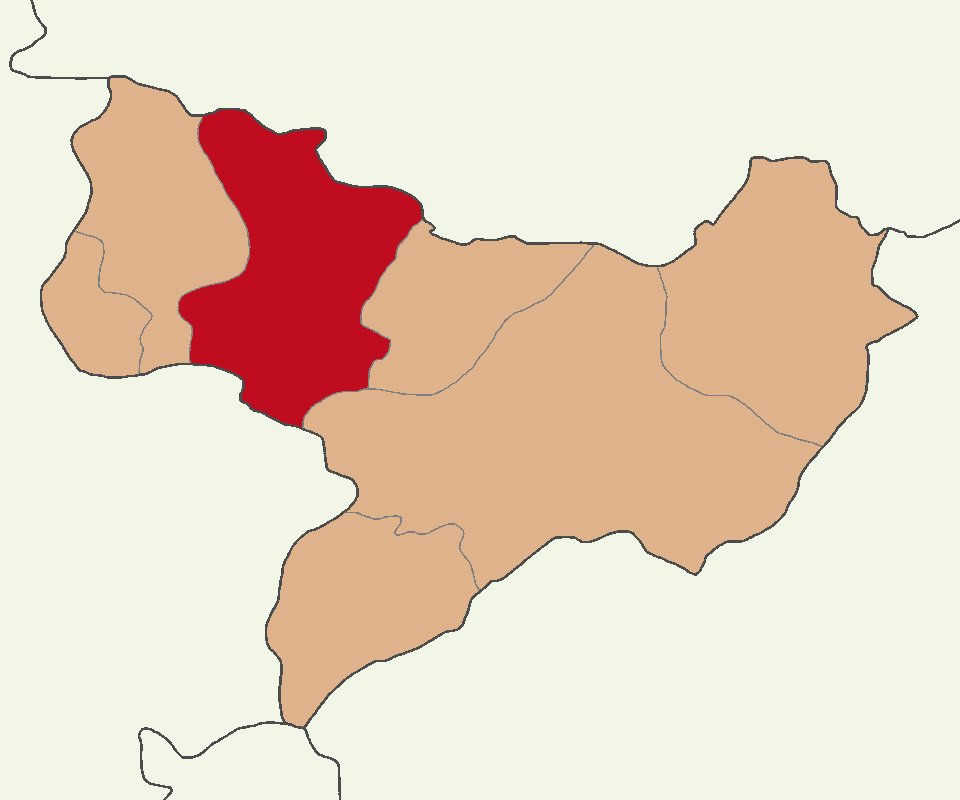
- Map showing Merzifon District in Amasya Province

- Location in Turkey
- Coordinates: 40°52′30″N 35°27′48″E
- Country: Turkey
- Province: Amasya
- Seat: Merzifon

Government
  - Kaymakam: Ali Güldoğan
- Area: 888 km^{2} (343 sq mi)
- Population (2021): 74,727
  - Density: 84/km^{2} (220/sq mi)
- Time zone: UTC+3 (TRT)
- Website: www.merzifon.gov.tr

Merzifon District is a district of Amasya Province of Turkey. Its seat is the city Merzifon. Its area is 888 km^{2}, and its population is 74,727 (2021).

== Composition ==
There is one municipality in Merzifon District:

- Merzifon

There are 70 villages in Merzifon District:

- Akören
- Akpınar
- Aksungur
- Aktarla
- Alıcık
- Alişar
- Aşağıbük
- Bahçecik
- Balgöze
- Bayat
- Bayazıt
- Bulak
- Büyükçay
- Çamlıca
- Çavundur
- Çaybaşı
- Çayırköy
- Çayırözü
- Çobanören
- Demirpınar
- Derealan
- Diphacı
- Elmayolu
- Esentepe
- Eymir
- Gelinsini
- Gökçebağ
- Gümüştepe
- Hacet
- Hacıyakup
- Hanköy
- Hayrettinköy
- Hırka
- İnalanı
- Kamışlı
- Karacakaya
- Karamağara
- Karamustafapaşa
- Karatepe
- Karşıyaka
- Kayadüzü
- Kıreymir
- Kızıleğrek
- Koçköy
- Küçükçay
- Kuyuköy
- Mahmutlu
- Muşruf
- Ortabük
- Ortaova
- Osmanoğlu
- Oymaağaç
- Oymak
- Pekmezci
- Saraycık
- Sarıbuğday
- Sarıköy
- Sazlıca
- Selimiye
- Şeyhyeni
- Türkoğlu
- Uzunyazı
- Yakupköy
- Yalnız
- Yaylacık
- Yenice
- Yeşilören
- Yeşiltepe
- Yolüstü
- Yukarıbük
