= Yaylacık, Merzifon =

Yaylacık
- Village
- Location within Turkey
- Coordinates: 40°38′54″N 35°23′53″E
- Country: Turkey
- Province: Amasya
- District: Merzifon
- Population (2021): 70
- Time zone: UTC+3 (TRT)

Yaylacık is a village in the Merzifon District, Amasya Province, Turkey. Its population is 70 (2021). In 2005 it passed from the Amasya District to the Merzifon District.
