= Gölyaka District =

District of Düzce Province, Turkey

- District
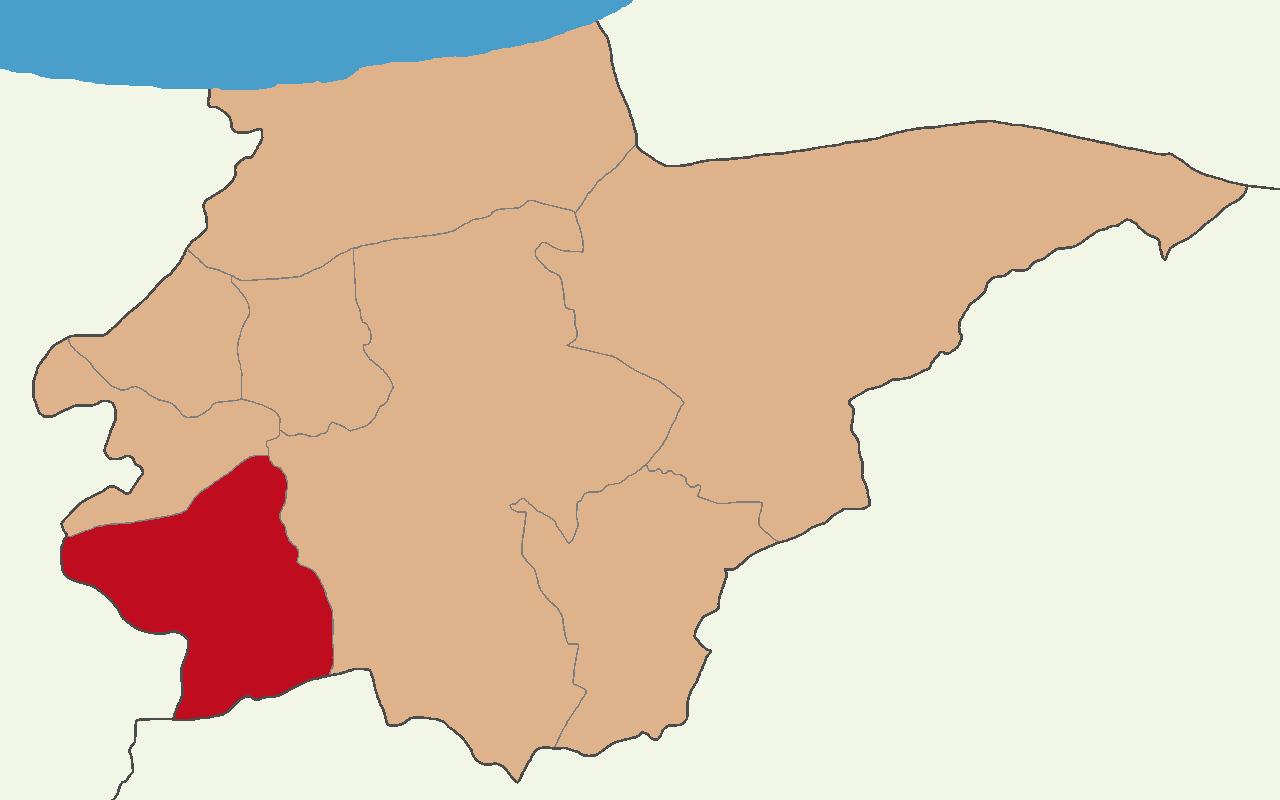
- Map showing Gölyaka District in Düzce Province

- Location in Turkey
- Coordinates: 40°45′N 30°59′E
- Country: Turkey
- Province: Düzce
- Seat: Gölyaka

Government
  - Kaymakam: Ali Tuğrul Yıldız
- Area: 228 km^{2} (88 sq mi)
- Population (2022): 20,552
  - Density: 90/km^{2} (230/sq mi)
- Time zone: UTC+3 (TRT)
- Website: www.golyaka.gov.tr

Gölyaka District is a district of the Düzce Province of Turkey. Its seat is the town of Gölyaka. Its area is 228 km^{2}, and its population is 20,552 (2022).

== Composition ==
There is one municipality in Gölyaka District:

- Gölyaka

There are 21 villages in Gölyaka District:

- Açma
- Aksu
- Bakacak
- Bekiroğlu
- Çamlıbel
- Çayköy
- Değirmentepe
- Güzeldere
- Hacısüleymanbey
- Hacıyakup
- Hamamüstü
- İçmeler
- Kemeryanı
- Muhapdede
- Saçmalıpınar
- Sarıdere
- Taşlık
- Yazlık
- Yeşilova
- Yunusefendi
- Zekeriyaköy
