= Çavundur, Kurşunlu =

Village in Turkey

Çavundur
- Neighbourhood
- Country: Turkey
- Province: Çankırı
- District: Kurşunlu
- Municipality: Kurşunlu
- Population (2021): 499
- Time zone: UTC+3 (TRT)

Çavundur is a neighbourhood of the town Kurşunlu, Kurşunlu District, Çankırı Province, Turkey. Its population is 499 (2021). Before the 2013 reorganisation, it was a town (belde).
