= Bayazıt, Merzifon =

Bayazıt
- Village
- Location within Turkey
- Coordinates: 40.7031°N 35.4885°E
- Country: Turkey
- Province: Amasya
- District: Merzifon
- Population (2021): 79
- Time zone: UTC+3 (TRT)

Bayazıt is a village in the Merzifon District, Amasya Province, Turkey. Its population is 79 (2021).
