= Ortaova, Merzifon =

Ortaova
- Village
- Location within Turkey
- Coordinates: 40°49′N 35°31′E
- Country: Turkey
- Province: Amasya
- District: Merzifon
- Population (2021): 742
- Time zone: UTC+3 (TRT)

Ortaova is a village in the Merzifon District, Amasya Province, Turkey. Its population is 742 (2021).
