= Gölyaka =

- Municipality
- Location within Turkey
- Coordinates: 40°46′37″N 30°59′45″E
- Country: Turkey
- Province: Düzce
- District: Gölyaka

Government
  - Mayor: Yakup Demircan (AKP)
- Population (2022): 10,516
- Time zone: UTC+3 (TRT)
- Area code: 0380
- Climate: Cfb
- Website: www.golyaka.bel.tr

Gölyaka is a town in Düzce Province in the Black Sea region of Turkey. It is the seat of Gölyaka District. Its population is 10,516 (2022). The mayor is Yakup Demircan (AKP).
