= Zekeriyaköy, Gölyaka =

Village in Turkey

Zekeriyaköy
- Village
- Location in Turkey
- Coordinates: 40.7755°N 30.9294°E
- Country: Turkey
- Province: Düzce
- District: Gölyaka
- Population (2022): 440
- Time zone: UTC+3 (TRT)

Zekeriyaköy is a village in the Gölyaka District of Düzce Province in Turkey. Its population is 440 (2022).
