= Şeyhyeni, Merzifon =

Şeyhyeni
- Village
- Location within Turkey
- Coordinates: 40°52′0″N 35°31′0″E
- Country: Turkey
- Province: Amasya
- District: Merzifon
- Population (2021): 89
- Time zone: UTC+3 (TRT)
- Postal code: 05300
- Area code: 0358

Şeyhyeni is a village in the Merzifon District, Amasya Province, Turkey. Its population is 89 (2021).
