= Büyükçay, Merzifon =

Büyükçay
- Village
- Location within Turkey
- Coordinates: 40°43′N 35°17′E
- Country: Turkey
- Province: Amasya
- District: Merzifon
- Population (2021): 128
- Time zone: UTC+3 (TRT)

Büyükçay is a village in the Merzifon District, Amasya Province, Turkey. Its population is 128 (2021).
