= Gelinsini, Merzifon =

Gelinsini
- Village
- Location within Turkey
- Coordinates: 40°57′N 35°27′E
- Country: Turkey
- Province: Amasya
- District: Merzifon
- Population (2021): 33
- Time zone: UTC+3 (TRT)

Gelinsini is a village in the Merzifon District, Amasya Province, Turkey. Its population is 33 (2021).
