= Mahmutlu, Merzifon =

Mahmutlu
- Village
- Location within Turkey
- Coordinates: 40.6506°N 35.3578°E
- Country: Turkey
- Province: Amasya
- District: Merzifon
- Population (2021): 62
- Time zone: UTC+3 (TRT)

Mahmutlu is a village in the Merzifon District, Amasya Province, Turkey. Its population is 62 (2021).
