= Uzunyazı, Merzifon =

Uzunyazı
- Village
- Location within Turkey
- Coordinates: 40°47′43″N 35°26′06″E
- Country: Turkey
- Province: Amasya
- District: Merzifon
- Population (2021): 102
- Time zone: UTC+3 (TRT)

Uzunyazı is a village in the Merzifon District, Amasya Province, Turkey. Its population is 102 (2021).
