= Akören, Merzifon =

Akören
- Village
- Location within Turkey
- Coordinates: 40.8880°N 35.3592°E
- Country: Turkey
- Province: Amasya
- District: Merzifon
- Population (2021): 565
- Time zone: UTC+3 (TRT)

Akören is a village in the Merzifon District, Amasya Province, Turkey. Its population is 565 (2021).
