= Karamağara, Merzifon =

Karamağara
- Village
- Location within Turkey
- Coordinates: 40.8840°N 35.3860°E
- Country: Turkey
- Province: Amasya
- District: Merzifon
- Population (2021): 157
- Time zone: UTC+3 (TRT)

Karamağara is a village in the Merzifon District, Amasya Province, Turkey. Its population is 157 (2021).
