= Çaybaşı, Merzifon =

Çaybaşı
- Village
- Location within Turkey
- Coordinates: 40.7102°N 35.3861°E
- Country: Turkey
- Province: Amasya
- District: Merzifon
- Population (2021): 362
- Time zone: UTC+3 (TRT)

Çaybaşı is a village in the Merzifon District, Amasya Province, Turkey. Its population is 362 (2021).
