= Hacısüleymanbey, Gölyaka =

Village in Turkey

Hacısüleymanbey
- Village
- Location in Turkey
- Coordinates: 40.76513°N 30.94457°E
- Country: Turkey
- Province: Düzce
- District: Gölyaka
- Population (2022): 276
- Time zone: UTC+3 (TRT)

Hacısüleymanbey is a village in the Gölyaka District of Düzce Province in Turkey. Its population is 276 (2022).
