= İnalanı, Merzifon =

İnalanı
- Village
- Location within Turkey
- Coordinates: 40°55′N 35°26′E
- Country: Turkey
- Province: Amasya
- District: Merzifon
- Population (2021): 83
- Time zone: UTC+3 (TRT)

İnalanı is a village in the Merzifon District, Amasya Province, Turkey. Its population is 83 (2021).
