= Taşkaracalar, Kurşunlu =

Village in Turkey

Taşkaracalar
- Village
- Location in Turkey Taşkaracalar (Turkey Central Anatolia)
- Coordinates: 40°43′N 33°16′E
- Country: Turkey
- Province: Çankırı
- District: Kurşunlu
- Population (2021): 245
- Time zone: UTC+3 (TRT)

Taşkaracalar is a village in the Kurşunlu District of Çankırı Province in Turkey. Its population is 245 (2021). Before the 2013 reorganisation, it was a town (belde).
