= Koçköy, Merzifon =

Koçköy
- Village
- Location within Turkey
- Country: Turkey
- Province: Amasya
- District: Merzifon
- Population (2021): 70
- Time zone: UTC+3 (TRT)

Koçköy (also: Koç) is a village in the Merzifon District, Amasya Province, Turkey. Its population is 70 (2021).
