= Bayat, Merzifon =

Bayat
- Village
- Location within Turkey
- Coordinates: 40.9167°N 35.6167°E
- Country: Turkey
- Province: Amasya
- District: Merzifon
- Population (2021): 80
- Time zone: UTC+3 (TRT)

Bayat is a village in the Merzifon District, Amasya Province, Turkey. Its population is 80 (2021).
