= İçmeler, Gölyaka =

Village in Turkey

İçmeler
- Village
- Location in Turkey
- Coordinates: 40°48′51″N 31°00′52″E
- Country: Turkey
- Province: Düzce
- District: Gölyaka
- Population (2022): 739
- Time zone: UTC+3 (TRT)

İçmeler is a village in the Gölyaka District of Düzce Province in Turkey. Its population is 739 (2022). The village is populated by Kurds.
