= Sarıbuğday, Merzifon =

Sarıbuğday
- Village
- Location within Turkey
- Coordinates: 40.7481°N 35.4597°E
- Country: Turkey
- Province: Amasya
- District: Merzifon
- Population (2021): 340
- Time zone: UTC+3 (TRT)

Sarıbuğday is a village in the Merzifon District, Amasya Province, Turkey. Its population is 340 (2021).
