= Çiyni, Kurşunlu =

Village in Turkey

Çiyni
- Neighbourhood
- Country: Turkey
- Province: Çankırı
- District: Kurşunlu
- Municipality: Kurşunlu
- Population (2021): 66
- Time zone: UTC+3 (TRT)

Çiyni is a neighbourhood of the town Kurşunlu, Kurşunlu District, Çankırı Province, Turkey. Its population is 66 (2021).
