= Başovacık, Kurşunlu =

Village in Turkey

Başovacık
- Village
- Location in Turkey Başovacık (Turkey Central Anatolia)
- Coordinates: 40.8986°N 33.1808°E
- Country: Turkey
- Province: Çankırı
- District: Kurşunlu
- Population (2021): 68
- Time zone: UTC+3 (TRT)

Başovacık is a village in the Kurşunlu District of Çankırı Province in Turkey. Its population is 68 (2021).
