= Çayköy, Gölyaka =

Village in Turkey

Çayköy
- Village
- Country: Turkey
- Province: Düzce
- District: Gölyaka
- Population (2022): 178
- Time zone: UTC+3 (TRT)

Çayköy is a village in the Gölyaka District of Düzce Province in Turkey. Its population is 178 (2022).
