= Vespa 400 =

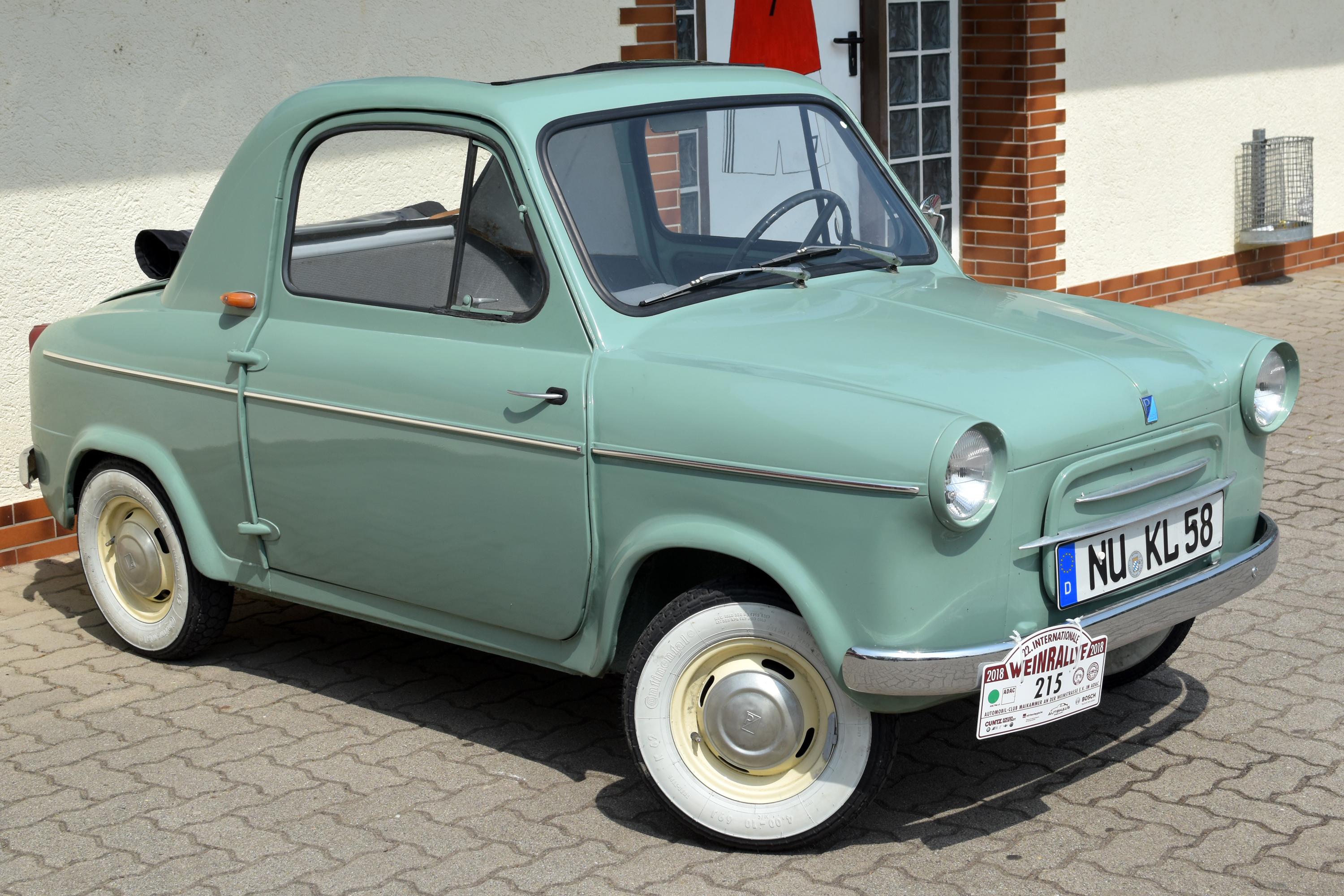

Overview
- Manufacturer: ACMA
- Production: 1957–1961
- Assembly: Fourchambault, France

Body and chassis
- Class: Microcar
- Body style: 2-door cabrio coach
- Layout: Rear-engine, rear-wheel-drive

Powertrain
- Engine: 24.0 cu in (0.4 L) two-stroke I2
- Transmission: 3-speed manual (GT 4-speed)

Dimensions
- Wheelbase: 1,693 mm (66.7 in)
- Length: 2,850 mm (112 in)
- Width: 1,270 mm (50 in)
- Height: 50 in (1,300 mm)
- Curb weight: 360 kg (790 lb)

The Vespa 400 is a rear-engined microcar, produced by ACMA in Fourchambault, France, from 1957 until 1961 to the designs of the Italian Piaggio company. Three different versions were sold, the "Luxe", "Tourisme" and "GT".

== Overview ==
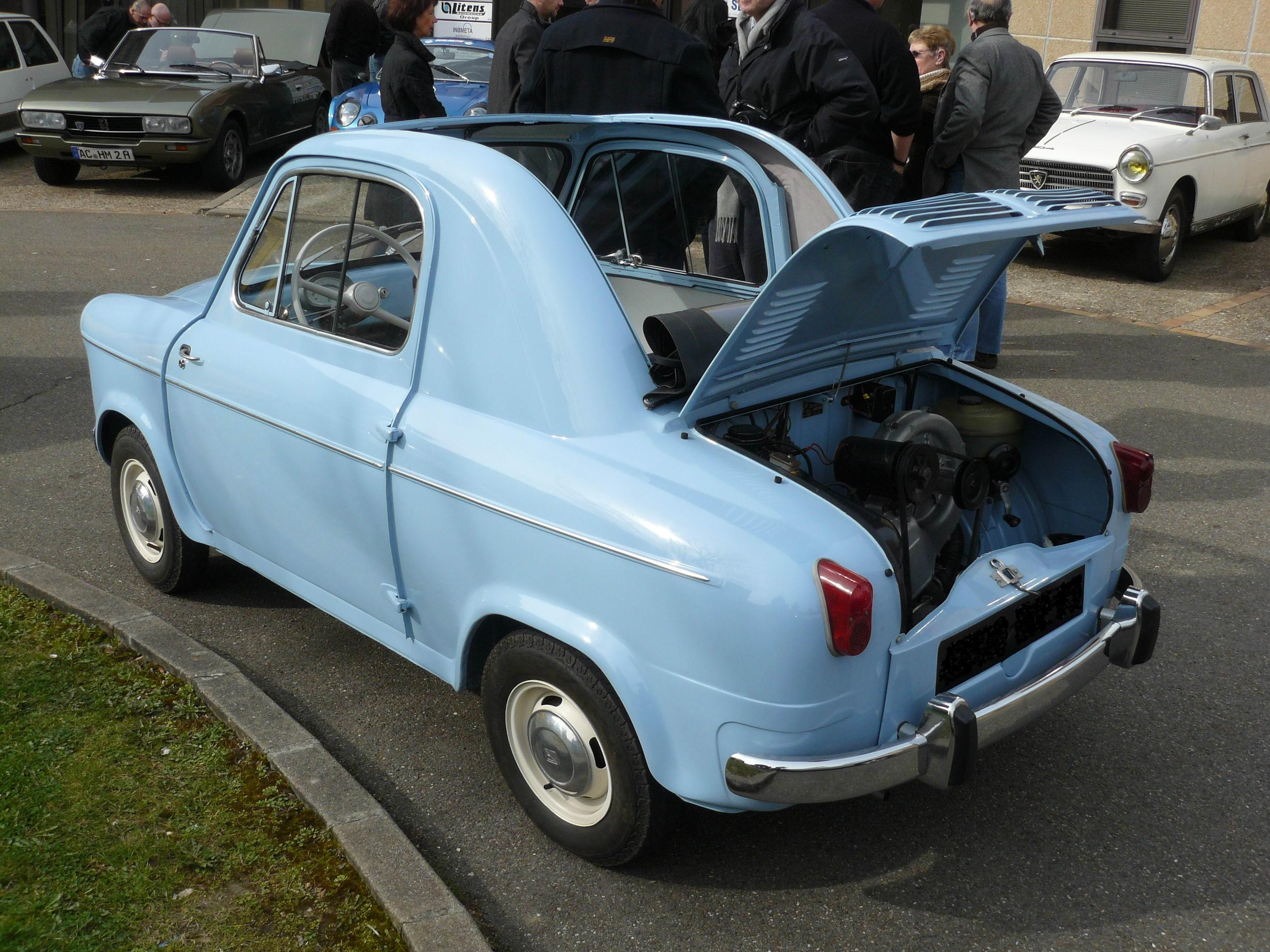
Vespa 400 with fabric roof retracted

The car made its high-profile public debut on 26 September 1957 at a press presentation staged in Monaco. The ACMA directors ensured a good attendance from members of the press by also inviting three celebrity racing drivers to the Vespa 400 launch.

The 400 was a two seater with room behind the seats to accommodate luggage or two small children on an optional cushion. The front seats were simple tubular metal frames with cloth upholstery on elastic "springs" and between the seats were the handbrake, starter and choke. The gear change was centrally floor mounted. The rear hinged doors were coated on the inside with only a thin plastic lining attached to the metal door panel skin allowing valuable extra internal space. On the early cars the main door windows did not open which attracted criticism, but increased the usable width for the driver and passenger. Instrumentation was very basic with only a speedometer and warning lights for low fuel, dynamo charging and indicators. The cabriolet fabric roof could be rolled back from the windscreen header rail to the top of the rear engine cover leaving conventional metal sides above the doors. The 12-volt battery was located at the front of the car, behind the dummy front grille, on a shelf that could be slid out. The spare wheel was stowed in a well under the passenger seat.

== Marketing ==
The high-profile launch paid off, with 12,130 cars produced in 1958. That turned out to be the high point, however, and output fell to 8,717 in 1959 despite a price reduction for the entry level 2-seater "normal" coupé from 345,000 francs to 319,500 francs between October 1957 and October 1958. Commentators suggested that the chic image created at the time of the launch was not always matched by the car itself, with its awkward gear change, poor sound-proofing and, especially before a modification to the carburetor specification, high fuel consumption. The car's origins, developed by a leading world producer of motor scooters, Italy's Piaggio Company, makers of the Vespa since 1946, was reflected in the installation, in the Vespa 400, of a two stroke (motorbike style) engine which required oil to be added to the petrol/gasoline whenever the car was refueled. During the summer of 1958 the cars were fitted with a semi-automatic device for adding oil to the fuel, but a fully automatic fuel mixing device was not included until two years later.

== Road test ==
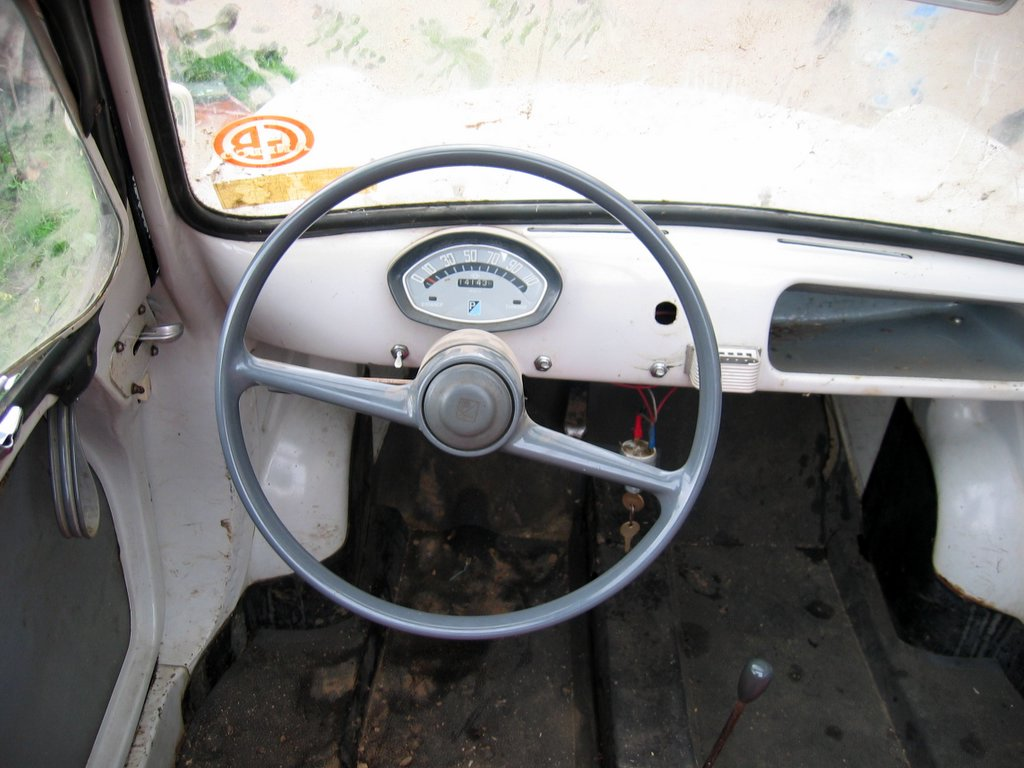
Vespa 400 dashboard

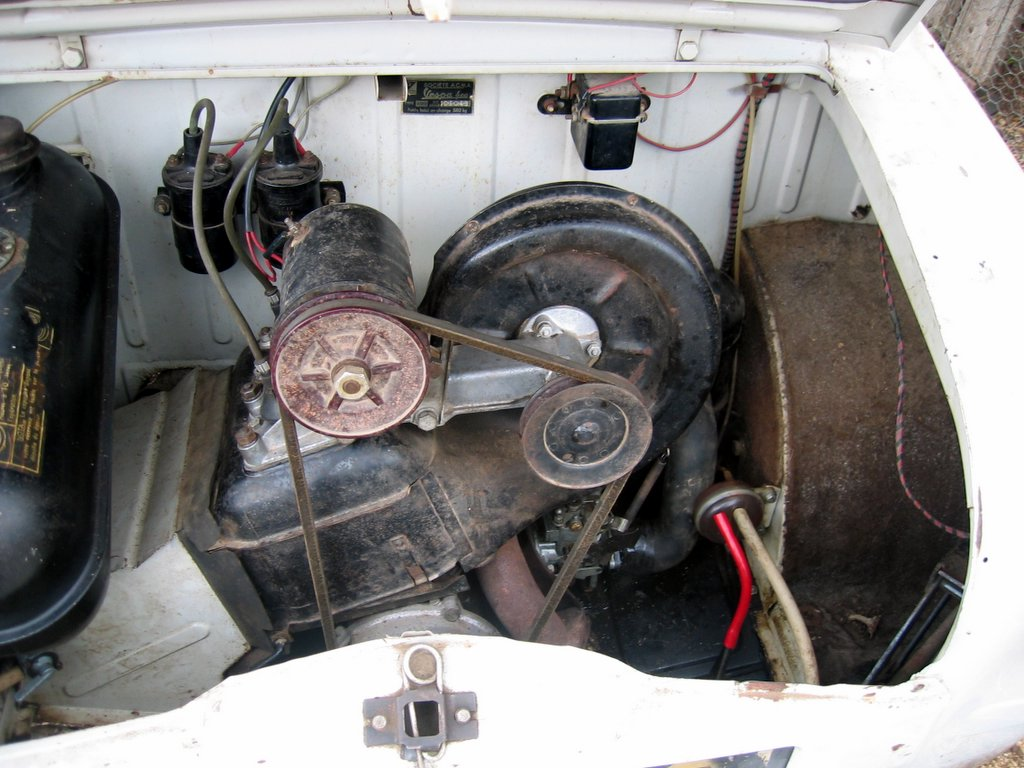
Vespa 400 engine

The British Motor magazine tested a 400 de luxe saloon in 1959 recording a top speed of 51.8 mph (83.4 km/h) and acceleration from 0-40 mph (64 km/h) in 23.0 seconds and a fuel consumption of 55.3 miles per imperial gallon (5.11 L/100 km; 46.0 mpg_{‑US}). The test car cost 351,725 "old" French Francs, cheaper than the 374,000 "old" French Francs domestic market starting price quoted towards the end of 1958 for the cheapest version of the larger but (even) less powerful Citroën 2CV.

== Specifications ==
Engine
Two cylinder, two-stroke, air-cooled. Bore and stroke: 63 mm x 63 mm (393 cc). Motor cyclists at the time were used to mixing oil into their fuel, but the manufacturer belatedly realised that this might compromise the 400's standing as a "car", and from the summer of 1958 the two-stroke oil was held in separate reservoir with a semi-automatic dispenser on the right side of the engine bay.
Compression ratio
6.4:1 with 13 hp, later increased respectively to 6.6:1 and 14 hp.

Suspension
Four wheel independent. Four double acting hydraulic shock absorbers with coil springs. Front anti-roll bar.
Manual transmission
3 speed plus reverse, with 2nd & 3rd synchromesh. 4 speed available only in Europe markets (GT version).
Brakes
Hydraulically operated drums of 6.75 in (171 mm) diameter.

Performance
With only 14 hp (10 kW), top speed is 50 to 55 mph (80 to 90 km/h), depending on road grade, wind conditions, etc. Achieving top speed takes 25 seconds. Fuel economy is about 5 L/100 km (47.0 mpg_{‑US}).
