= Aksu, Gölyaka =

Village in Turkey

Aksu
- Village
- Location in Turkey
- Coordinates: 40.7573°N 30.9578°E
- Country: Turkey
- Province: Düzce
- District: Gölyaka
- Population (2022): 253
- Time zone: UTC+3 (TRT)

Aksu is a village in the Gölyaka District of Düzce Province in Turkey. Its population is 253 (2022).
