= Balgöze, Merzifon =

Balgöze
- Village
- Location within Turkey
- Coordinates: 40.6813°N 35.3413°E
- Country: Turkey
- Province: Amasya
- District: Merzifon
- Population (2021): 178
- Time zone: UTC+3 (TRT)

Balgöze is a village in the Merzifon District, Amasya Province, Turkey. Its population is 178 (2021).
