= European route E95 =

Road in trans-European E-road network

Coordinates: 53.0247°N 30.5652°E

E95

Route information
- Length: 2,527 km (1,570 mi)

Major junctions
- North end: Saint Petersburg, Russia
- South end: Merzifon, Turkey

Location
- Countries: Russia; Belarus; Ukraine; Turkey

Highway system
- International E-road network; A Class; B Class

The European route E95 is an imagined route in Europe and a part of the United Nations International E-road network. Approximately 2,527 kilometres (1,570 mi) long, it connects Saint Petersburg with Merzifon in north central Turkey. Between its northern terminus in Russia and its southern end, it passes in addition through Belarus and Ukraine. Between the ports of Odesa / Chornomorsk on Ukraine's southern coast and ports of Turkey (particularly, Samsun) vehicles are required to cross the Black Sea by ferry over a distance of 731 kilometres (454 mi).

In Ukraine, the E95 designation is not signed as Ukraine does not number its routes at all except in internal circumstances.

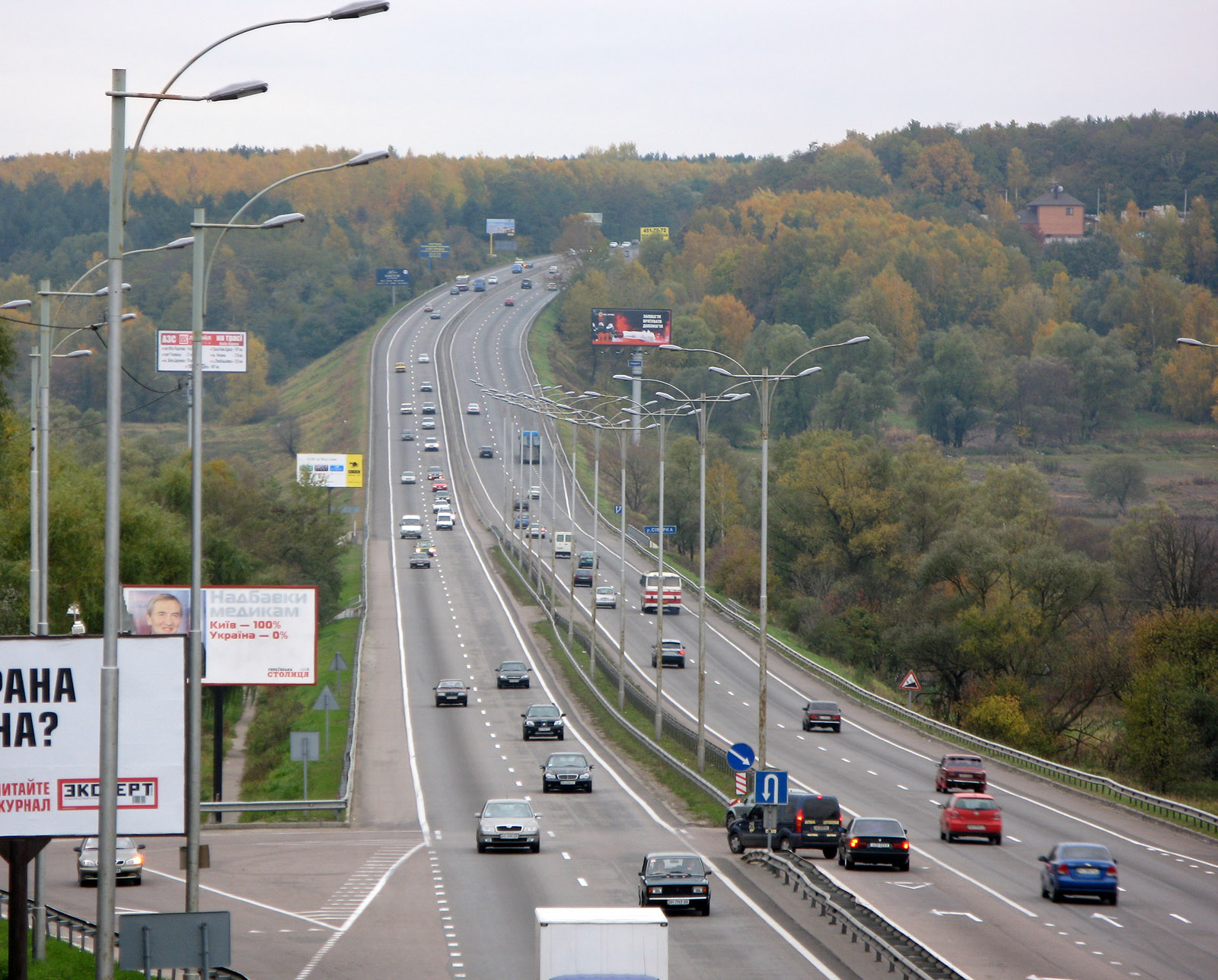
Section of the E95/M05 highway near Kyiv.

== Route ==
Russia

- R 23: St. Petersburg - Pushkin - Gatchina - Luga - Pskov - Ostrov - Opochka - Pustoshka - Nevel

Belarus

- M 8: Haradok - Vitebsk - Orsha - Mogilev - Gomel

Ukraine

- M 01: Chernihiv - Brovary - Kyiv
- M 05: Kyiv - Vasylkiv - Bila Tserkva
- P 32 / M 05: Bila Tserkva
- M 05: Zhashkiv - Uman - Blahovishchenske - Liubashivka - Petrovirivka - Znamianka - Odesa

(Ukraine) Odesa – (Turkey) Samsun

There currently is no ferry from Odesa to Samsun. The best alternative is the ferry to Samsun from Chornomorsk, about 2 km (1.2 mi) away from Odesa.

Turkey

- D.010: Samsun
- D.795: Samsun - Kavak - Havza - Kayadüzü (Start of Concurrency with E80)
- D.100: Kayadüzü - Merzifon (End of Concurrency with E80

== Trivia ==
Russian hard rock band Alisa has a song called "Trassa E-95" dedicated to the road between Moscow and Saint Petersburg (previously part of E95, now part of E105).
