= Karacakaya, Merzifon =

Karacakaya
- Village
- Location within Turkey
- Coordinates: 40.7743°N 35.3451°E
- Country: Turkey
- Province: Amasya
- District: Merzifon
- Population (2021): 118
- Time zone: UTC+3 (TRT)

Karacakaya is a village in the Merzifon District, Amasya Province, Turkey. Its population is 118 (2021).
