= Sumucak, Kurşunlu =

Village in Turkey

Sumucak
- Village
- Location in Turkey Sumucak (Turkey Central Anatolia)
- Coordinates: 40°49′33″N 33°20′47″E
- Country: Turkey
- Province: Çankırı
- District: Kurşunlu
- Population (2021): 117
- Time zone: UTC+3 (TRT)

Sumucak is a village in the Kurşunlu District of Çankırı Province in Turkey. Its population is 117 (2021).
