= Yenice, Merzifon =

Yenice
- Village
- Location within Turkey
- Country: Turkey
- Province: Amasya
- District: Merzifon
- Population (2021): 57
- Time zone: UTC+3 (TRT)

Yenice is a village in the Merzifon District, Amasya Province, Turkey. Its population is 57 (2021).
