= Aksungur, Merzifon =

Aksungur
- Village
- Location within Turkey
- Coordinates: 40°54′00″N 35°31′18″E
- Country: Turkey
- Province: Amasya
- District: Merzifon
- Elevation: 800 m (2,600 ft)
- Population (2021): 151
- Time zone: UTC+3 (TRT)
- Postal code: 05300
- Area code: 0358

Aksungur is a village in the Merzifon District, Amasya Province, Turkey. Its population is 151 (2021).
