= Yunusefendi, Gölyaka =

Village in Turkey

Yunusefendi
- Village
- Location within Turkey
- Coordinates: 40°44′37″N 31°00′45″E
- Country: Turkey
- Province: Düzce
- District: Gölyaka
- Population (2022): 681
- Time zone: UTC+3 (TRT)

Yunusefendi is a village in the Gölyaka District of Düzce Province in Turkey. Its population is 681 (2022).
