= Diphacı, Merzifon =

Diphacı
- Village
- Location within Turkey
- Coordinates: 40°45′N 35°15′E
- Country: Turkey
- Province: Amasya
- District: Merzifon
- Population (2021): 247
- Time zone: UTC+3 (TRT)

Diphacı is a village in the Merzifon District, Amasya Province, Turkey. Its population is 247 (2021).
