= Akpınar, Merzifon =

Akpınar
- Village
- Location within Turkey
- Coordinates: 40.7044°N 35.4303°E
- Country: Turkey
- Province: Amasya
- District: Merzifon
- Population (2021): 180
- Time zone: UTC+3 (TRT)

Akpınar is a village in the Merzifon District, Amasya Province, Turkey. Its population is 180 (2021).
