= Hayrettinköy, Merzifon =

Village in Merzifon, Amasya, Turkey

Hayrettinköy
- Village
- Location within Turkey
- Coordinates: 40°48′N 35°25′E
- Country: Turkey
- Province: Amasya
- District: Merzifon
- Population (2021): 132
- Time zone: UTC+3 (TRT)

Hayrettinköy (also: Hayrettin) is a village in the Merzifon District, Amasya Province, Turkey. Its population is 132 (2021).
