= Muhapdede, Gölyaka =

Village in Turkey

Muhapdede
- Village
- Location in Turkey
- Coordinates: 40°45′N 30°54′E
- Country: Turkey
- Province: Düzce
- District: Gölyaka
- Population (2022): 109
- Time zone: UTC+3 (TRT)

Muhapdede is a village in the Gölyaka District of Düzce Province in Turkey. Its population is 109 (2022).
