= Sarıköy, Merzifon =

Sarıköy
- Village
- Location within Turkey
- Coordinates: 40.8621°N 35.3978°E
- Country: Turkey
- Province: Amasya
- District: Merzifon
- Population (2021): 298
- Time zone: UTC+3 (TRT)

Sarıköy (also: Sarı) is a village in the Merzifon District, Amasya Province, Turkey. Its population is 298 (2021).
