= Aktarla, Merzifon =

Aktarla
- Village
- Location within Turkey
- Coordinates: 40.7220°N 35.5469°E
- Country: Turkey
- Province: Amasya
- District: Merzifon
- Population (2021): 112
- Time zone: UTC+3 (TRT)

Aktarla is a village in the Merzifon District, Amasya Province, Turkey. Its population is 112 (2021).
