= Yolüstü, Merzifon =

Yolüstü
- Village
- Location within Turkey
- Coordinates: 40.8412°N 35.4856°E
- Country: Turkey
- Province: Amasya
- District: Merzifon
- Population (2021): 249
- Time zone: UTC+3 (TRT)

Yolüstü is a village in the Merzifon District, Amasya Province, Turkey. Its population is 249 (2021).
