= Hocahasan, Kurşunlu =

Village in Turkey

Hocahasan
- Village
- Location in Turkey Hocahasan (Turkey Central Anatolia)
- Coordinates: 40°47′03″N 33°20′42″E
- Country: Turkey
- Province: Çankırı
- District: Kurşunlu
- Population (2021): 231
- Time zone: UTC+3 (TRT)

Hocahasan is a village in the Kurşunlu District of Çankırı Province in Turkey. Its population is 231 (2021).
