= Bulak, Merzifon =

Bulak
- Village
- Location within Turkey
- Coordinates: 40.7939°N 35.2866°E
- Country: Turkey
- Province: Amasya
- District: Merzifon
- Population (2021): 317
- Time zone: UTC+3 (TRT)

Bulak is a village in the Merzifon District, Amasya Province, Turkey. Its population is 317 (2021).
