= Sazlıca, Merzifon =

Sazlıca
- Village
- Location within Turkey
- Coordinates: 40.8379°N 35.4458°E
- Country: Turkey
- Province: Amasya
- District: Merzifon
- Population (2021): 115
- Time zone: UTC+3 (TRT)

Sazlıca is a village in the Merzifon District, Amasya Province, Turkey. Its population is 115 (2021).
