= Kızıleğrek, Merzifon =

Kızıleğrek
- Village
- Location within Turkey
- Coordinates: 40°42′N 35°28′E
- Country: Turkey
- Province: Amasya
- District: Merzifon
- Population (2021): 343
- Time zone: UTC+3 (TRT)

Kızıleğrek is a village in the Merzifon District, Amasya Province, Turkey. Its population is 343 (2021).
