= Muşruf =

- Village
- Location within Turkey
- Coordinates: 40.8960°N 35.4291°E
- Country: Turkey
- Province: Amasya
- District: Merzifon
- Population (2021): 1,038
- Time zone: UTC+3 (TRT)

Muşruf (formerly: Yakacık) is a village in the Merzifon District, Amasya Province, Turkey. Its population is 1,038 (2021).
