= Kurşunlu =

- Municipality
- Location in Turkey Kurşunlu (Turkey Central Anatolia)
- Coordinates: 40°51′N 33°15′E
- Country: Turkey
- Province: Çankırı
- District: Kurşunlu

Government
  - Mayor: Șerafettin Uslu (MHP)
- Elevation: 1,114 m (3,655 ft)
- Population (2021): 4,908
- Time zone: UTC+3 (TRT)
- Area code: 0376
- Website: www.kursunlu.bel.tr

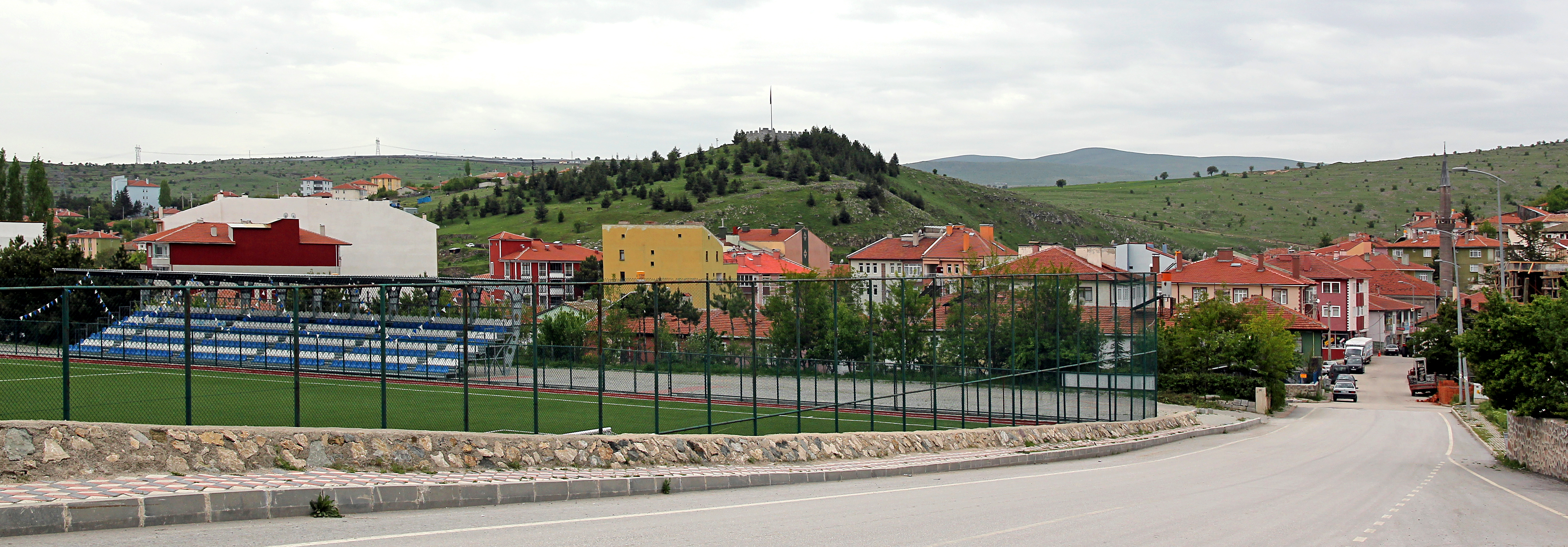
Kurşunlu Kalesi and Andinata fortress in Kurşunlu in the northern Turkish province of Çankırı

Kurșunlu, formerly Karacaviran, is a town in Çankırı Province in the Central Anatolia region of Turkey. It is the seat of Kurşunlu District. Its population is 4,908 (2021). The town consists of 12 quarters: Beşpınar, Cömertler, Çal, Hacıbekir, Kalekapı, Yeni, Yeşil, Erenler, Kale, Müslüm, Çavundur and Çiyni. Its elevation is 1,114 m (3,655 ft). It was affected by the Kurşunlu earthquake in 1951.
