= Saçmalıpınar, Gölyaka =

Village in Turkey

Saçmalıpınar
- Village
- Location in Turkey
- Coordinates: 40°44′N 30°57′E
- Country: Turkey
- Province: Düzce
- District: Gölyaka
- Population (2022): 971
- Time zone: UTC+3 (TRT)

Saçmalıpınar is a village in the Gölyaka District of Düzce Province in Turkey. Its population is 971 (2022).
