= Karşıyaka, Merzifon =

Karşıyaka
- Village
- Location within Turkey
- Coordinates: 40.7237°N 35.5092°E
- Country: Turkey
- Province: Amasya
- District: Merzifon
- Population (2021): 291
- Time zone: UTC+3 (TRT)

Karşıyaka is a village in the Merzifon District, Amasya Province, Turkey. Its population is 291 (2021).
