= Çamlıbel, Gölyaka =

Village in Turkey

Çamlıbel
- Village
- Location in Turkey
- Coordinates: 40.7377°N 31.0302°E
- Country: Turkey
- Province: Düzce
- District: Gölyaka
- Population (2022): 327
- Time zone: UTC+3 (TRT)

Çamlıbel is a village in the Gölyaka District of Düzce Province in Turkey. Its population is 327 (2022).
