= Hacet, Merzifon =

Hacet
- Village
- Location within Turkey
- Coordinates: 40.7569°N 35.3413°E
- Country: Turkey
- Province: Amasya
- District: Merzifon
- Population (2021): 14
- Time zone: UTC+3 (TRT)

Hacet is a village in the Merzifon District, Amasya Province, Turkey. Its population is 14 (2021).
