= Karatepe, Merzifon =

Karatepe
- Village
- Location within Turkey
- Coordinates: 40°49′59″N 35°23′36″E
- Country: Turkey
- Province: Amasya
- District: Merzifon
- Population (2021): 225
- Time zone: UTC+3 (TRT)

Karatepe is a village in the Merzifon District, Amasya Province, Turkey. Its population is 225 (2021).
