= Değirmentepe, Gölyaka =

Village in Turkey

Değirmentepe
- Village
- Location in Turkey
- Coordinates: 40°45′05″N 30°54′17″E
- Country: Turkey
- Province: Düzce
- District: Gölyaka
- Population (2022): 323
- Time zone: UTC+3 (TRT)

Değirmentepe is a village in the Gölyaka District of Düzce Province in Turkey. Its population is 323 (2022).
