= Gökçebağ, Merzifon =

Gökçebağ
- Village
- Location within Turkey
- Coordinates: 40.8541°N 35.5334°E
- Country: Turkey
- Province: Amasya
- District: Merzifon
- Population (2021): 286
- Time zone: UTC+3 (TRT)

Gökçebağ is a village in the Merzifon District, Amasya Province, Turkey. Its population is 286 (2021).
