= Türkoğlu, Merzifon =

Türkoğlu
- Village
- Location within Turkey
- Coordinates: 40.7429°N 35.3733°E
- Country: Turkey
- Province: Amasya
- District: Merzifon
- Population (2021): 20
- Time zone: UTC+3 (TRT)

Türkoğlu is a village in the Merzifon District, Amasya Province, Turkey. Its population is 20 (2021).
