= Eymir, Merzifon =

Eymir
- Village
- Location within Turkey
- Coordinates: 40°47′36″N 35°14′27″E
- Country: Turkey
- Province: Amasya
- District: Merzifon
- Population (2021): 267
- Time zone: UTC+3 (TRT)

Eymir is a village in the Merzifon District, Amasya Province, Turkey. Its population is 267 (2021).
