= Hanköy, Merzifon =

Hanköy
- Village
- Location within Turkey
- Country: Turkey
- Province: Amasya
- District: Merzifon
- Population (2021): 240
- Time zone: UTC+3 (TRT)

Hanköy (also: Han) is a village in the Merzifon District, Amasya Province, Turkey. Its population is 240 (2021).
