= Oymak, Merzifon =

Oymak
- Village
- Location within Turkey
- Coordinates: 40.7879°N 35.4140°E
- Country: Turkey
- Province: Amasya
- District: Merzifon
- Population (2021): 59
- Time zone: UTC+3 (TRT)

Oymak is a village in the Merzifon District, Amasya Province, Turkey. Its population is 59 (2021).
