= Pekmezci, Merzifon =

Pekmezci
- Village
- Location within Turkey
- Coordinates: 40.7179°N 35.3246°E
- Country: Turkey
- Province: Amasya
- District: Merzifon
- Population (2021): 65
- Time zone: UTC+3 (TRT)

Pekmezci is a village in the Merzifon District, Amasya Province, Turkey. Its population is 65 (2021).
