= Kamışlı, Merzifon =

Kamışlı
- Village
- Location within Turkey
- Coordinates: 40.7307°N 35.4280°E
- Country: Turkey
- Province: Amasya
- District: Merzifon
- Population (2021): 264
- Time zone: UTC+3 (TRT)

Kamışlı is a village in the Merzifon District, Amasya Province, Turkey. Its population is 264 (2021).
