= Demirpınar, Merzifon =

Demirpınar
- Village
- Location within Turkey
- Coordinates: 40.7420°N 35.3143°E
- Country: Turkey
- Province: Amasya
- District: Merzifon
- Population (2021): 68
- Time zone: UTC+3 (TRT)

Demirpınar is a village in the Merzifon District, Amasya Province, Turkey. Its population is 68 (2021).
