= Kızılca, Kurşunlu =

Village in Turkey

Kızılca
- Village
- Country: Turkey
- Province: Çankırı
- District: Kurşunlu
- Population (2021): 73
- Time zone: UTC+3 (TRT)

Kızılca is a village in the Kurşunlu District of Çankırı Province in Turkey. Its population is 73 (2021).
