= Bahçecik, Merzifon =

Bahçecik
- Village
- Location within Turkey
- Coordinates: 40°51′40″N 35°28′40″E
- Country: Turkey
- Province: Amasya
- District: Merzifon
- Population (2021): 210
- Time zone: UTC+3 (TRT)

Bahçecik is a village in the Merzifon District, Amasya Province, Turkey. Its population is 210 (2021).
