= Sünürlü, Kurşunlu =

Village in Turkey

Sünürlü
- Village
- Location in Turkey Sünürlü (Turkey Central Anatolia)
- Coordinates: 40°43′N 33°12′E
- Country: Turkey
- Province: Çankırı
- District: Kurşunlu
- Population (2021): 171
- Time zone: UTC+3 (TRT)

Sünürlü is a village in the Kurşunlu District of Çankırı Province in Turkey. Its population is 171 (2021).
