= Sarıdere, Gölyaka =

Village in Turkey

Sarıdere
- Village
- Location within Turkey
- Coordinates: 40.82250°N 30.99750°E
- Country: Turkey
- Province: Düzce
- District: Gölyaka
- Population (2022): 475
- Time zone: UTC+3 (TRT)

Sarıdere is a village in the Gölyaka District of Düzce Province in Turkey. Its population is 475 (2022).
