= Çayırköy, Merzifon =

Çayırköy
- Village
- Location within Turkey
- Coordinates: 40.8650°N 35.5595°E
- Country: Turkey
- Province: Amasya
- District: Merzifon
- Population (2021): 18
- Time zone: UTC+3 (TRT)

Çayırköy (also: Çayır) is a village in the Merzifon District, Amasya Province, Turkey. Its population is 18 (2021).
