= Çukurca, Kurşunlu =

Village in Turkey

Coordinates: 40.815°N 33.317°E

Çukurca
- Village
- Location in Turkey Çukurca (Turkey Central Anatolia)
- Coordinates
- Country: Turkey
- Province: Çankırı
- District: Kurşunlu
- Population (2021): 44
- Time zone: UTC+3 (TRT)

Çukurca is a village in the Kurşunlu District of Çankırı Province in Turkey. Its population is 44 (2021).

== Geography ==
The village is 98 km from Çankırı provincial center and 8 km from Kurşunlu district center. The village is southeast of Kurşunlu and is connected to the Kurşunlu-Korgun provincial road numbered 18.75 by a 1.4 km. village road. It is on the edge of Devrez Stream, a tributary of the Kızılırmak River.
