= Çayırözü, Merzifon =

Çayırözü
- Village
- Location within Turkey
- Coordinates: 40.7898°N 35.4661°E
- Country: Turkey
- Province: Amasya
- District: Merzifon
- Population (2021): 125
- Time zone: UTC+3 (TRT)

Çayırözü is a village in the Merzifon District, Amasya Province, Turkey. Its population is 125 as of the 2021 census.
