= Saraycık, Merzifon =

Saraycık
- Village
- Location within Turkey
- Country: Turkey
- Province: Amasya
- District: Merzifon
- Population (2021): 59
- Time zone: UTC+3 (TRT)

Saraycık is a village in the Merzifon District, Amasya Province, Turkey. Its population is 59 (2021).
