= Alişar, Merzifon =

Alişar
- Village
- Location within Turkey
- Coordinates: 40.7081°N 35.5120°E
- Country: Turkey
- Province: Amasya
- District: Merzifon
- Population (2021): 163
- Time zone: UTC+3 (TRT)

Alişar is a village in the Merzifon District, Amasya Province, Turkey. Its population is 163 (2021).
