= Yakupköy, Merzifon =

Yakupköy
- Village
- Location within Turkey
- Coordinates: 40.7986°N 35.4061°E
- Country: Turkey
- Province: Amasya
- District: Merzifon
- Population (2021): 287
- Time zone: UTC+3 (TRT)

Yakupköy (also: Yakup) is a village in the Merzifon District, Amasya Province, Turkey. Its population is 287 (2021).
