= Küçükçay, Merzifon =

Küçükçay
- Village
- Location within Turkey
- Coordinates: 40.7309°N 35.2797°E
- Country: Turkey
- Province: Amasya
- District: Merzifon
- Population (2021): 89
- Time zone: UTC+3 (TRT)

Küçükçay is a village in the Merzifon District, Amasya Province, Turkey. Its population is 89 (2021).
