= Yazlık, Gölyaka =

Village in Turkey

Yazlık
- Village
- Location in Turkey
- Coordinates: 40°47′03″N 30°58′18″E
- Country: Turkey
- Province: Düzce
- District: Gölyaka
- Population (2022): 333
- Time zone: UTC+3 (TRT)

Yazlık is a village in the Gölyaka District of Düzce Province in Turkey. Its population is 333 (2022).
