= Hamamüstü, Gölyaka =

Village in Turkey

Hamamüstü
- Village
- Location in Turkey
- Coordinates: 40.7477°N 31.0411°E
- Country: Turkey
- Province: Düzce
- District: Gölyaka
- Population (2022): 522
- Time zone: UTC+3 (TRT)

Hamamüstü is a village in the Gölyaka District of Düzce Province in Turkey. Its population is 522 (2022).

== History ==
In a village names list from the Ministry of Internal Affairs of the Republic of Turkey, dated 1928, it is referred to as "Hamamüstü Gürcüler".
