= Sarıalan, Kurşunlu =

Village in Turkey

Sarıalan
- Village
- Country: Turkey
- Province: Çankırı
- District: Kurşunlu
- Population (2021): 116
- Time zone: UTC+3 (TRT)

Sarıalan is a village in the Kurşunlu District of Çankırı Province in Turkey. Its population is 116 (2021).
