= Aşağıbük, Merzifon =

Aşağıbük
- Village
- Location within Turkey
- Coordinates: 41°00′N 35°21′E
- Country: Turkey
- Province: Amasya
- District: Merzifon
- Population (2021): 29
- Time zone: UTC+3 (TRT)

Aşağıbük is a village in the Merzifon District, Amasya Province, Turkey. Its population is 29 (2021).
