= Alıcık, Merzifon =

Alıcık
- Village
- Location within Turkey
- Coordinates: 40.8027°N 35.3226°E
- Country: Turkey
- Province: Amasya
- District: Merzifon
- Population (2021): 410
- Time zone: UTC+3 (TRT)

Alıcık is a village in the Merzifon District, Amasya Province, Turkey. Its population is 410 (2021).
