= Derealan, Merzifon =

Derealan
- Village
- Location within Turkey
- Coordinates: 40°59′N 35°25′E
- Country: Turkey
- Province: Amasya
- District: Merzifon
- Population (2021): 111
- Time zone: UTC+3 (TRT)

Derealan is a village in the Merzifon District, Amasya Province, Turkey. Its population is 111 (2021).
