= Esentepe, Merzifon =

Esentepe
- Village
- Location within Turkey
- Coordinates: 40.697°N 35.538°E
- Country: Turkey
- Province: Amasya
- District: Merzifon
- Population (2021): 68
- Time zone: UTC+3 (TRT)

Esentepe is a village in the Merzifon District, Amasya Province, Turkey. Its population is 68 (2021).
