= Eskiahır, Kurşunlu =

Village in Turkey

Eskiahır
- Village
- Location in Turkey Eskiahır (Turkey Central Anatolia)
- Coordinates: 40°50′N 33°25′E
- Country: Turkey
- Province: Çankırı
- District: Kurşunlu
- Population (2021): 79
- Time zone: UTC+3 (TRT)

Eskiahır is a village in the Kurşunlu District of Çankırı Province in Turkey. Its population is 79 (2021).
