= Çatkese, Kurşunlu =

Village in Turkey

Çatkese
- Village
- Location in Turkey Çatkese (Turkey Central Anatolia)
- Coordinates: 40°53′N 33°13′E
- Country: Turkey
- Province: Çankırı
- District: Kurşunlu
- Population (2021): 165
- Time zone: UTC+3 (TRT)

Çatkese is a village in the Kurşunlu District of Çankırı Province in Turkey. Its population is 165 (2021).
