= Kemeryanı, Gölyaka =

Village in Turkey

Kemeryanı
- Village
- Location in Turkey
- Coordinates: 40°49′26″N 31°00′47″E
- Country: Turkey
- Province: Düzce
- District: Gölyaka
- Population (2022): 531
- Time zone: UTC+3 (TRT)

Kemeryanı is a village in the Gölyaka District of Düzce Province in Turkey. Its population is 531 (2022).
