= Bekiroğlu, Gölyaka =

Village in Turkey

Bekiroğlu
- Village
- Location in Turkey
- Coordinates: 40.7612°N 30.9148°E
- Country: Turkey
- Province: Düzce
- District: Gölyaka
- Population (2022): 277
- Time zone: UTC+3 (TRT)

Bekiroğlu is a village in the Gölyaka District of Düzce Province in Turkey. Its population is 277 (2022).
