= Ağılözü, Kurşunlu =

Village in Turkey

Ağılözü
- Village
- Location in Turkey Ağılözü (Turkey Central Anatolia)
- Coordinates: 40.8614°N 33.3986°E
- Country: Turkey
- Province: Çankırı
- District: Kurşunlu
- Population (2021): 51
- Time zone: UTC+3 (TRT)

Ağılözü is a village in the Kurşunlu District of Çankırı Province in Turkey. Its population is 51 (2021).
