= Elmayolu, Merzifon =

Elmayolu
- Village
- Location within Turkey
- Coordinates: 40°46′N 35°19′E
- Country: Turkey
- Province: Amasya
- District: Merzifon
- Population (2021): 129
- Time zone: UTC+3 (TRT)

Elmayolu is a village in the Merzifon District, Amasya Province, Turkey. Its population in 2021 was 129.
