= Yalnız, Merzifon =

Yalnız
- Village
- Location within Turkey
- Coordinates: 40.7744°N 35.5283°E
- Country: Turkey
- Province: Amasya
- District: Merzifon
- Population (2021): 131
- Time zone: UTC+3 (TRT)

Yalnız is a village in the Merzifon District, Amasya Province, Turkey. Its population is 131 (2021).
