= Çırdak, Kurşunlu =

Village in Turkey

Çırdak
- Village
- Country: Turkey
- Province: Çankırı
- District: Kurşunlu
- Population (2021): 33
- Time zone: UTC+3 (TRT)

Çırdak is a village in the Kurşunlu District of Çankırı Province in Turkey. Its population is 33 (2021).
