= Bakacak, Gölyaka =

Village in Turkey

Bakacak
- Village
- Location in Turkey
- Coordinates: 40.7389°N 30.9819°E
- Country: Turkey
- Province: Düzce
- District: Gölyaka
- Population (2022): 545
- Time zone: UTC+3 (TRT)

Bakacak is a village in the Gölyaka District of Düzce Province in Turkey. Its population is 545 (2022).
