= Çamlıca, Merzifon =

Çamlıca
- Village
- Location within Turkey
- Coordinates: 40.7508°N 35.3564°E
- Country: Turkey
- Province: Amasya
- District: Merzifon
- Population (2021): 110
- Time zone: UTC+3 (TRT)

Çamlıca is a village in the Merzifon District, Amasya Province, Turkey. Its population is 110 (2021).
