= Ortabük, Merzifon =

Ortabük
- Village
- Location within Turkey
- Coordinates: 41°01′N 35°20′E
- Country: Turkey
- Province: Amasya
- District: Merzifon
- Population (2021): 30
- Time zone: UTC+3 (TRT)

Ortabük is a village in the Merzifon District, Amasya Province, Turkey. Its population is 30 (2021).
