= Kıreymir, Merzifon =

Kıreymir
- Village
- Location within Turkey
- Coordinates: 40°46′N 35°24′E
- Country: Turkey
- Province: Amasya
- District: Merzifon
- Population (2021): 99
- Time zone: UTC+3 (TRT)

Kıreymir is a village in the Merzifon District, Amasya Province, Turkey. Its population is 99 (2021).
