= Bereket, Kurşunlu =

Village in Turkey

Bereket
- Village
- Location in Turkey Bereket (Turkey Central Anatolia)
- Coordinates: 40.8498°N 33.3011°E
- Country: Turkey
- Province: Çankırı
- District: Kurşunlu
- Population (2021): 49
- Time zone: UTC+3 (TRT)

Bereket is a village in the Kurşunlu District of Çankırı Province in Turkey. Its population is 49 (2021).
