= Çobanören, Merzifon =

Çobanören
- Village
- Location within Turkey
- Coordinates: 40.8908°N 35.5415°E
- Country: Turkey
- Province: Amasya
- District: Merzifon
- Population (2021): 165
- Time zone: UTC+3 (TRT)

Çobanören is a village in the Merzifon District, Amasya Province, Turkey. Its population is 165 (2021).
