= Osmanoğlu, Merzifon =

Osmanoğlu
- Village
- Location within Turkey
- Coordinates: 40°56′N 35°35′E
- Country: Turkey
- Province: Amasya
- District: Merzifon
- Population (2021): 66
- Time zone: UTC+3 (TRT)

Osmanoğlu is a village in the Merzifon District, Amasya Province, Turkey. Its population is 66 (2021).
