= Dumanlı, Kurşunlu =

Village in Turkey

Dumanlı
- Village
- Country: Turkey
- Province: Çankırı
- District: Kurşunlu
- Population (2021): 279
- Time zone: UTC+3 (TRT)

Dumanlı is a village in the Kurşunlu District of Çankırı Province in Turkey. Its population is 279 (2021). Before the 2013 reorganisation, it was a town (belde).
