= Hacıyakup, Merzifon =

Hacıyakup
- Village
- Location within Turkey
- Coordinates: 40.7386°N 35.3406°E
- Country: Turkey
- Province: Amasya
- District: Merzifon
- Population (2021): 86
- Time zone: UTC+3 (TRT)

Hacıyakup is a village in the Merzifon District, Amasya Province, Turkey. Its population is 86 (2021).
