= Güzeldere, Gölyaka =

Village in Turkey

Güzeldere
- Village
- Country: Turkey
- Province: Düzce
- District: Gölyaka
- Population (2022): 282
- Time zone: UTC+3 (TRT)

Güzeldere is a village in the Gölyaka District of Düzce Province in Turkey. Its population is 282 (2022).
