= Hacımuslu, Kurşunlu =

Village in Turkey

Hacımuslu
- Village
- Location in Turkey Hacımuslu (Turkey Central Anatolia)
- Coordinates: 40.86983°N 33.30169°E
- Country: Turkey
- Province: Çankırı
- District: Kurşunlu
- Population (2021): 152
- Time zone: UTC+3 (TRT)

Hacımuslu is a village in the Kurşunlu District of Çankırı Province in Turkey. Its population is 152 (2021). Before the 2013 reorganisation, it was a town (belde).
