= Açma, Gölyaka =

Village in Turkey

Açma
- Village
- Location in Turkey
- Coordinates: 40.7586°N 31.0014°E
- Country: Turkey
- Province: Düzce
- District: Gölyaka
- Population (2022): 647
- Time zone: UTC+3 (TRT)

Açma is a village in the Gölyaka District of Düzce Province in Turkey. Its population is 647 (2022).
