= Ateliers de construction de motocycles et d'automobiles =

French motorcycle manufacturer

ACMA was founded on 25 November 1950 as Ateliers de construction de motocycles et accessoires in Fourchambault, near Dijon, France.

It is remembered for the production of scooters and micro cars.

== Scooters ==
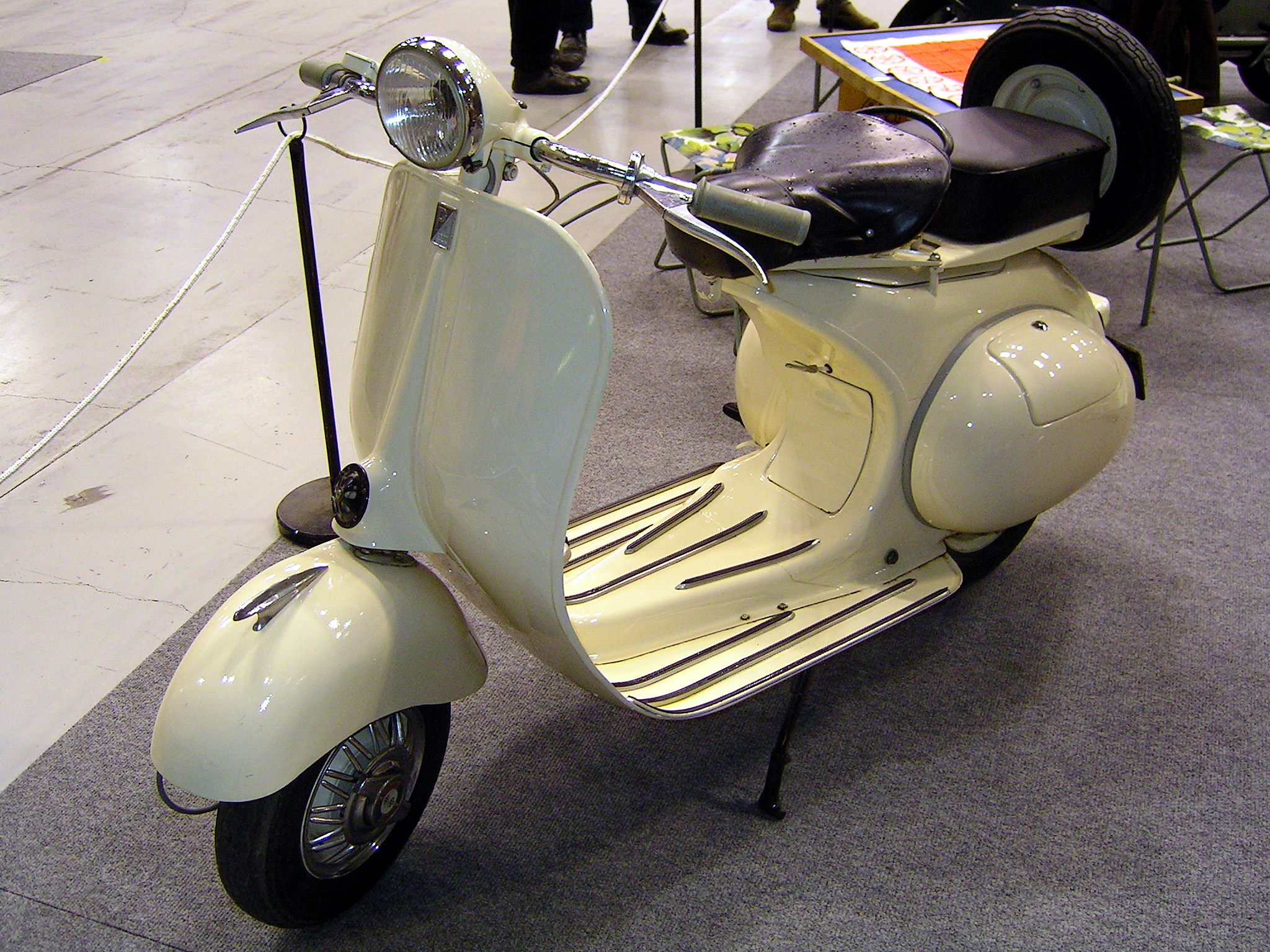
Vespa 125cc, built under licence by ACMA

Production started in February 1951 with 20 workers building 200 scooters. In April 1953, the 100,000th completed Vespa left the ACMA works.

In 1954, production of the 150,000th Vespa was celebrated.

It was also in 1954 that the company modified its name to Ateliers de construction de motocycles et d'automobiles.

== Micro cars ==
At the Paris Salon in 1957 the Vespa 400 was presented and production started the same year in the ACMA factory.

From 1957 until 1961 the company manufactured approximately 34,000 micro cars under licence from Piaggio.

The growth of the business involved an increase in employment, with the headcount peaking at approximately 2,800 in 1958. This had a major impact on the local economy, as the population of Fourchambault reached 6,242 in 1958, triggering the construction in the little town of an additional 200 homes along with a kindergarten and a primary school.

By launching its microcars the company tried to compensate for the general slump in scooter sales throughout continental Europe, but it turned out that the micro cars could not compete successfully with rivals such as Citroens 2 CV and the Renault 4. Inventory of unsold vehicles began to build up and production had to be slowed down. ACMA production ceased completely with the closure of the little factory on 31 December 1962.
