= American Composites Manufacturers Association =

ACMA logo

The American Composites Manufacturers Association (ACMA) is the world's largest trade association serving the composites industry. Its mission is to educate about and lobby for the composites industry and develop expansive markets for composite materials.

== Government affairs ==
ACMA political action committee logo

ACMA's government affairs department assists member companies in keeping up to date on current regulations. The government affairs department is also responsible for advocating on behalf of member companies when new legislation is being formed.

=== Political action committee ===
ACMA has operated its own political action committee since 2003. ACMA PAC supports members of Congress who agree with ACMA's views on issues affecting the composites industry.

=== Caucus ===
ACMA coordinates the Congressional Composites Caucus in an effort to encourage members of Congress to learn more about the composites industry. The caucus currently has 32 members and hosts 3–4 briefings annually to inform members of congress and their staff on the applications of composite materials. Caucus participation is achieved by ACMA member companies sending letters to their member of congress requesting that they join the caucus.

== Certification ==
An important part of ACMA's mandate is to certify composites employees. This is done through the ACMA Certified Composites Technician (CCT) training and exam. There are eight CCT programs each focusing on technical aspects of the composites industry.

== Conference ==
CM magazine logo

ACMA organizes a convention each year called COMPOSITES. The purpose of the convention is to educate manufacturers on emerging technologies in the composites industry and allow them to connect with buyers as well as suppliers.

== Magazine ==
ACMA writes and publishes a magazine for the composites industry called Composites Manufacturing. This is a published every second month addressing market segments for aerospace, architecture, automotive, energy, infrastructure, marine, military, sports/recreation and university R&D. The magazine keeps readers informed about the most recent developments in the composites industry.

== Scholarship ==
The Western Chapter Scholarship is a scholarship for employees, spouses and children of employees of companies in Alaska, Arizona, California, Colorado, Hawaii, Idaho, Montana, New Mexico, Nevada, Oregon, Utah, Washington and Wyoming who are ACMA members.
