= Çavundur, Merzifon =

Çavundur
- Village
- Location within Turkey
- Coordinates: 40.8852°N 35.5543°E
- Country: Turkey
- Province: Amasya
- District: Merzifon
- Population (2021): 236
- Time zone: UTC+3 (TRT)

Çavundur is a village in the Merzifon District, Amasya Province, Turkey. Its population is 236 (2021).
