= Çiyni, Agsu =

Çiyni
- Municipality
- Location within Azerbaijan
- Coordinates: 40°31′N 48°15′E
- Country: Azerbaijan
- Rayon: Agsu

Population
  - Total: 1,100
- Time zone: UTC+4 (AZT)
  - Summer (DST): UTC+5 (AZT)

Çiyni (also, Chiyni) is a village and municipality in the Agsu Rayon of Azerbaijan. It has a population of 1100.
