= Hacıyakup, Gölyaka =

Village in Turkey

Hacıyakup
- Village
- Location in Turkey
- Coordinates: 40°45′38″N 31°0′47″E
- Country: Turkey
- Province: Düzce
- District: Gölyaka
- Population (2022): 1,566
- Time zone: UTC+3 (TRT)

Hacıyakup is a village in the Gölyaka District of Düzce Province in Turkey. Its population is 1,566 (2022).
