= Kayadüzü, Merzifon =

Kayadüzü
- Village
- Location within Turkey
- Coordinates: 40.8908°N 35.5969°E
- Country: Turkey
- Province: Amasya
- District: Merzifon
- Population (2023): 1,256
- Time zone: UTC+3 (TRT)

Kayadüzü is a village in the Merzifon District, Amasya Province, Turkey. Its population is 1,256 (2023). Before the 2013 reorganisation, it was a town (belde).
