= Hırka, Merzifon =

Hırka
- Village
- Location within Turkey
- Coordinates: 40.9069°N 35.4716°E
- Country: Turkey
- Province: Amasya
- District: Merzifon
- Population (2021): 235
- Time zone: UTC+3 (TRT)

Hırka is a village in the Merzifon District, Amasya Province, Turkey. Its population is 235 (2021).
