= Kurşunlu District =

District of Çankırı Province, Turkey

- District
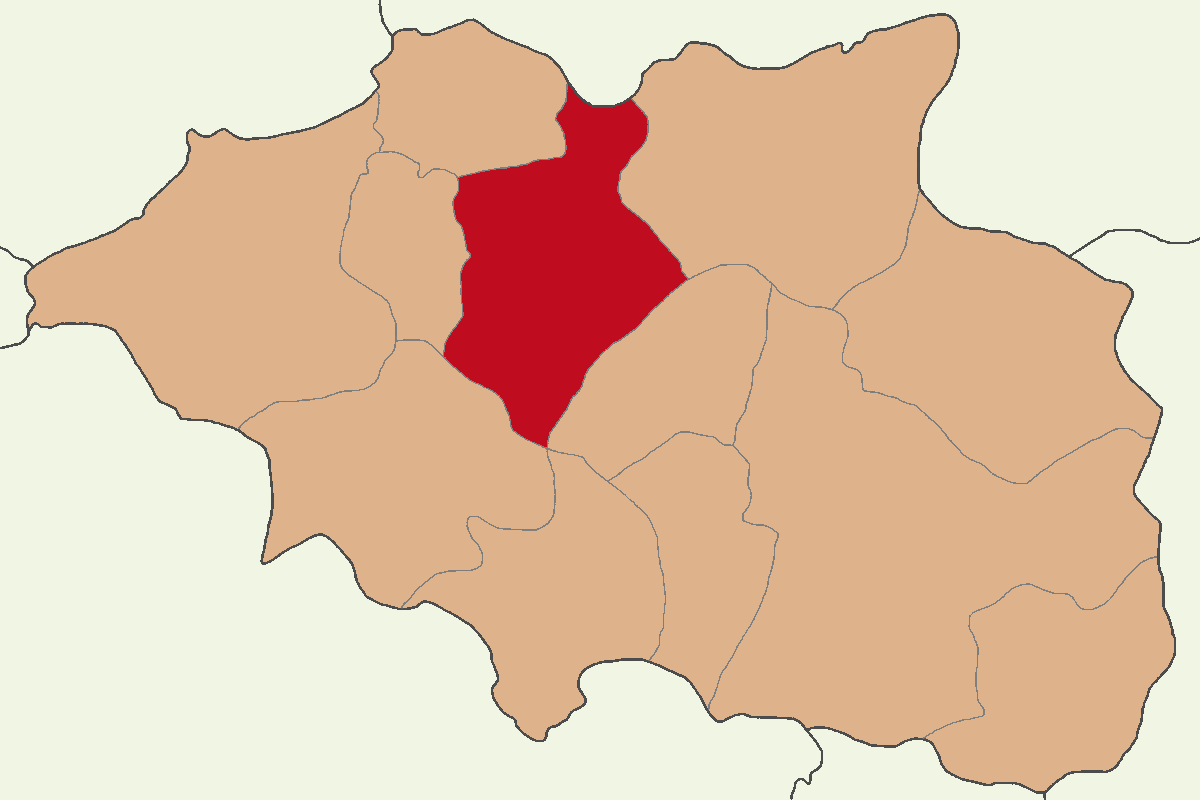
- Map showing Kurşunlu District in Çankırı Province

- Location in Turkey Kurşunlu District (Turkey Central Anatolia)
- Coordinates: 40°50′N 33°15′E
- Country: Turkey
- Province: Çankırı
- Seat: Kurşunlu

Government
  - Kaymakam: İlyas Öztürk
- Area: 609 km^{2} (235 sq mi)
- Population (2021): 8,463
  - Density: 14/km^{2} (36/sq mi)
- Time zone: UTC+3 (TRT)
- Website: www.kursunlu.gov.tr

Kurşunlu District is a district of the Çankırı Province of Turkey. Its seat is the town of Kurşunlu. Its area is 609 km^{2}, and its population is 8,463 (2021).

== Composition ==
There is one municipality in Kurşunlu District:

- Kurşunlu

There are 26 villages in Kurşunlu District:

- Ağılözü
- Başovacık
- Bereket
- Çatkese
- Çaylıca
- Çırdak
- Çukurca
- Dağören
- Demirciören
- Dumanlı
- Eskiahır
- Göllüce
- Hacımuslu
- Hocahasan
- İğdir
- Kapaklı
- Kızılca
- Köpürlü
- Madenli
- Sarıalan
- Sivricek
- Sumucak
- Sünürlü
- Taşkaracalar
- Yeşilören
- Yeşilöz
