= Havza =

- District and municipality
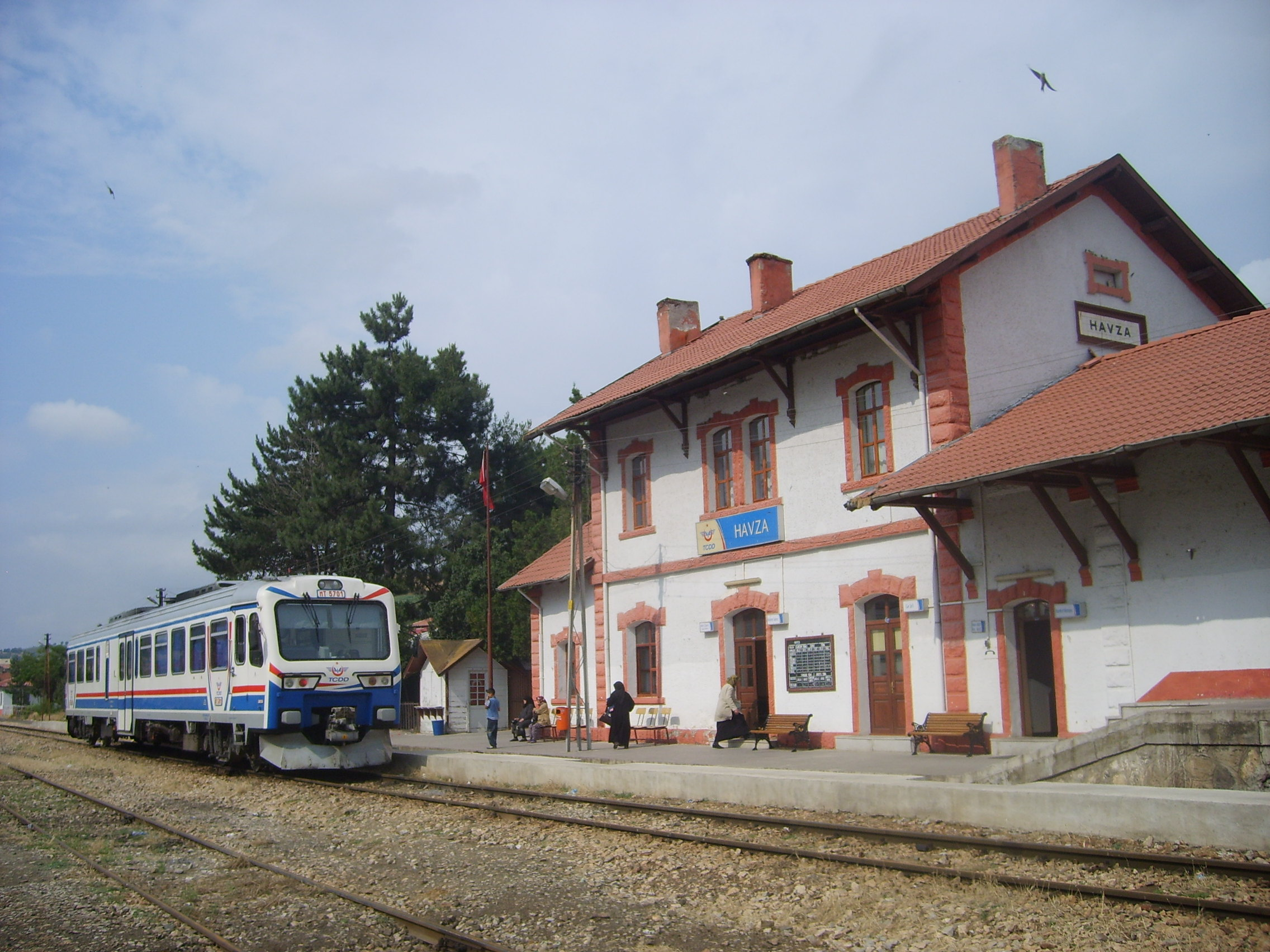
- Havza railway station

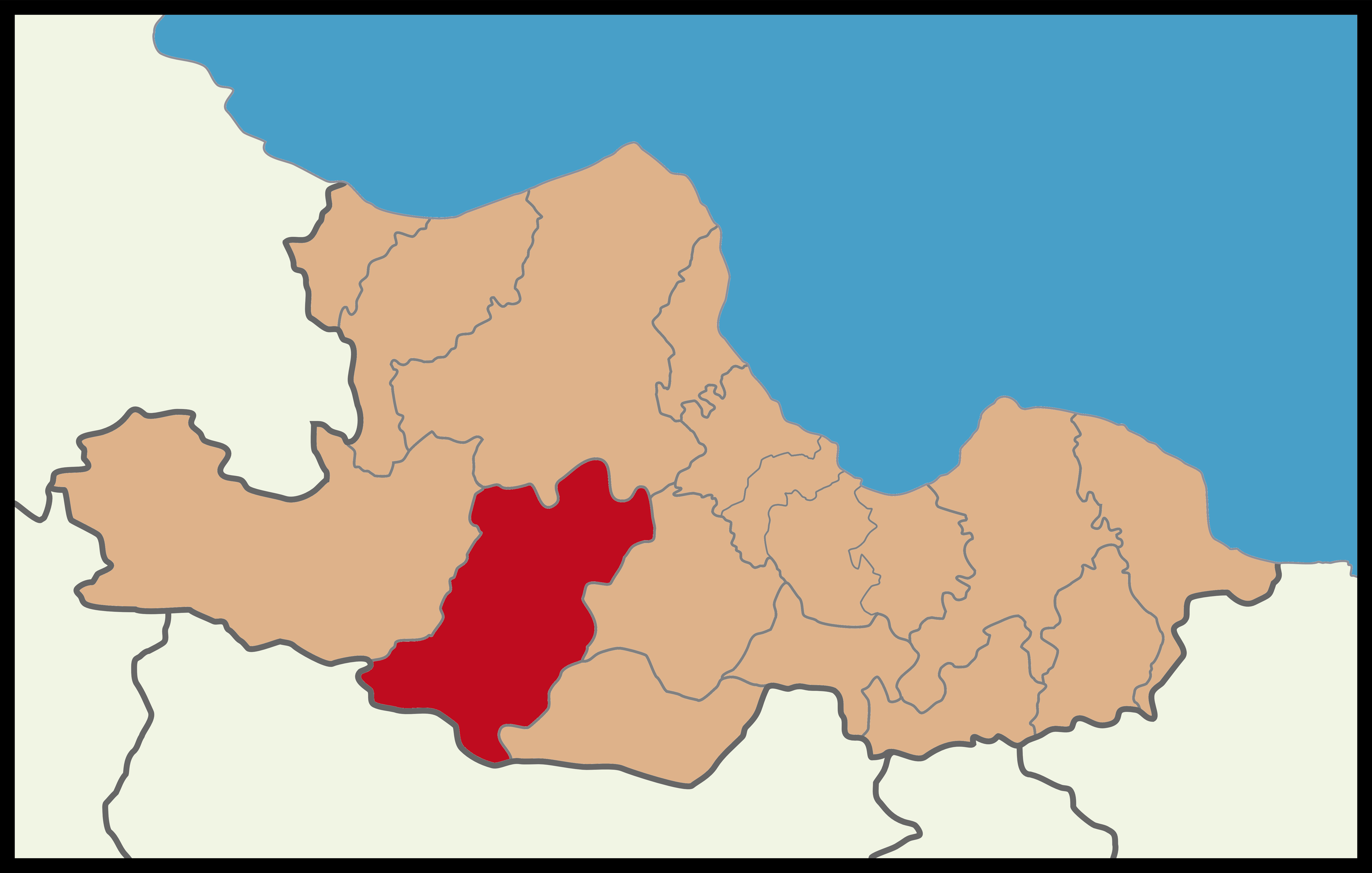
- Map showing Havza District in Samsun Province

- Location within Turkey
- Coordinates: 40°58′N 35°40′E
- Country: Turkey
- Province: Samsun

Government
  - Mayor: Murat İkiz (AKP)
- Area: 865 km^{2} (334 sq mi)
- Elevation: 675 m (2,215 ft)
- Population (2022): 38,492
  - Density: 44.5/km^{2} (115/sq mi)
- Time zone: UTC+3 (TRT)
- Postal code: 55700
- Area code: 0362
- Climate: Csb
- Website: www.havza.bel.tr

Havza (Ottoman حوضة) is a municipality and district of Samsun Province, Turkey. Its area is 865 km^{2}, and its population is 38,492 (2022). The mayor is Murat İkiz (AKP).

== Composition ==
There are 98 neighbourhoods in Havza District:

- 19 Mayıs
- 25 Mayıs
- Ağcamahmut
- Ağdırhasan
- Arslançayırı
- Aşağısusuz
- Aşağıyavucak
- Bahçelievler
- Başpelit
- Bekdiğin
- Belalan
- Beyköy
- Beyören
- Boyalı
- Boyalıca
- Çakıralan
- Çamyatağı
- Çay
- Çayırözü
- Çelikalan
- Celil
- Çeltek
- Cevizlik
- Çiftlikköy
- Değirmenüstü
- Demiryurt
- Dereköy
- Doğançayır
- Dündarlı
- Ekinpınarı
- Elmacık
- Ereli
- Erikbelen
- Ersandık
- Esenbey
- Eymir
- Gelincik
- Gidirli
- Göçmenler
- Güvercinlik
- Hacıbattal
- Hacıdede
- Hecinli
- Hilmiye
- İcadiye
- Ilıca
- İmaret
- İmircik
- İnönü
- Kaleköy
- Kamlık
- Karabük
- Karageçmiş
- Karahalil
- Karameşe
- Karga
- Karşıyaka
- Kayabaşı
- Kayacık
- Kemaliye
- Kirenlik
- Kıroğlu
- Kocaoğlu
- Kocapınar
- Küflek
- Kuşkonağı
- Medrese
- Memduhiye
- Meryemdere
- Mesudiye
- Mısmılağaç
- Mürsel
- Orhaniye
- Ortaklar
- Paşapınarı
- Pınarçay
- Şerifali
- Şeyhali
- Şeyhkoyun
- Şeyhler
- Şeyhsafi
- Sivrikese
- Sofular
- Sondaj
- Taşkaracaören
- Tekkeköy
- Tuzla
- Uluçal
- Üniversite
- Yağcımahmut
- Yaylaçatı
- Yazıkışla
- Yenice
- Yenimahalle
- Yenimescit
- Yeşilalan
- Yukarısusuz
- Yukarıyavucak
