= List of populated places in Çorum Province =

Places in Turkey

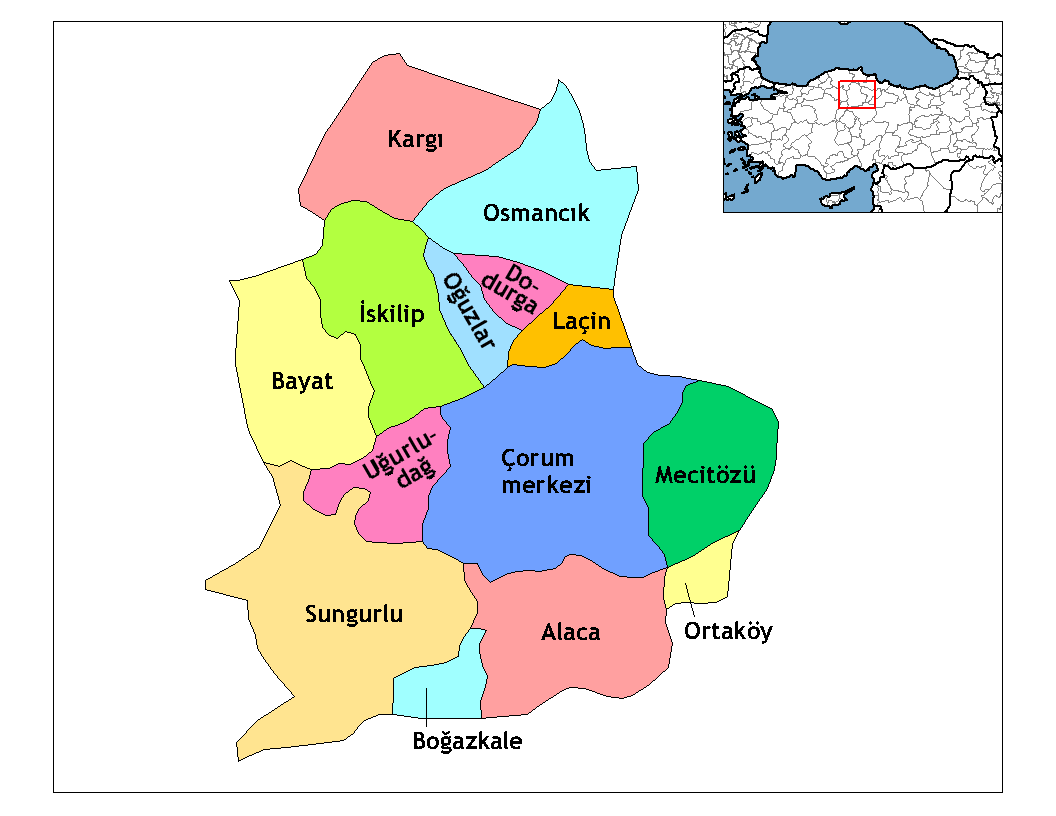
Çorum Province

Below is the list of populated places in Çorum Province, Turkey by the districts. In the following lists, first place in each list is the administrative center of the district.

== Çorum ==
- Çorum
- Abdalata, Çorum
- Acıpınar, Çorum
- Ahiilyas, Çorum
- Ahmediye, Çorum
- Ahmetoğlan, Çorum
- Akçakaya, Çorum
- Aksungur, Çorum
- Akyazı, Çorum
- Altınbaş, Çorum
- Arpalık, Çorum
- Arpaöz, Çorum
- Arslan, Çorum
- Aşağısaraylı, Çorum
- Atçalı, Çorum
- Ayaz, Çorum
- Ayvalı, Çorum
- Babaoğlu, Çorum
- Balımsultan, Çorum
- Balıyakup, Çorum
- Bayat, Çorum district
- Bektaşoğlu, Çorum
- Beydili, Çorum
- Boğabağı, Çorum
- Boğacık, Çorum
- Boğazönü, Çorum
- Bozboğa, Çorum
- Budakören, Çorum
- Büğdüz, Çorum
- Büğet, Çorum
- Büğrüoğlu, Çorum
- Burun, Çorum
- Büyükdivan, Çorum
- Büyükgülücek, Çorum
- Çağşak, Çorum
- Çakır, Çorum
- Çalıca, Çorum
- Çalkışla, Çorum
- Çaltıcak, Çorum
- Çalyayla, Çorum
- Çanakçı, Çorum
- Çatak, Çorum
- Çayhatap, Çorum
- Celilkırı, Çorum
- Cerit Köyü, Çorum
- Çeşmeören, Çorum
- Çıkrık, Çorum
- Çobandivan, Çorum
- Çomarbaşı, Çorum
- Çorak Köyü, Çorum
- Çukurören, Çorum
- Dağkarapınar, Çorum
- Değirmendere, Çorum
- Delibekiroğlu, Çorum
- Deliler, Çorum
- Deniz, Çorum
- Dere, Çorum
- Düdüklük, Çorum
- Dut, Çorum
- Dutçakallı, Çorum
- Düvenci, Çorum
- Elicek, Çorum
- Elköy, Çorum
- Elmalı, Çorum
- Erdek, Çorum
- Ertuğrul, Çorum
- Esençay, Çorum
- Eskice, Çorum
- Eskiekin, Çorum
- Eskikaradona, Çorum
- Eskiköy, Çorum
- Eskiören, Çorum
- Evcikuzkışla, Çorum
- Evciortakışla, Çorum
- Evciyenikışla, Çorum
- Eyerci, Çorum
- Eymir, Çorum
- Feruz, Çorum
- Gemet, Çorum
- Göcenovacığı, Çorum
- Gökçepınar, Çorum
- Gökdere, Çorum
- Gökköy, Çorum
- Güney, Çorum
- Güveçli, Çorum
- Güvenli, Çorum
- Güzelyurt, Çorum
- Hacıahmetderesi, Çorum
- Hacıbey, Çorum
- Hacımusa, Çorum
- Hacıpaşa, Çorum
- Hamamlıçay, Çorum
- Hamdiköy, Çorum
- Hankozlusu, Çorum
- Harmancık, Çorum
- Hımıroğlu, Çorum
- Hızırdede, Çorum
- İğdeli, Çorum
- İnalözü, Çorum
- İsmailköy, Çorum
- Kadıderesi, Çorum
- Kadıkırı, Çorum
- Kalehisar, Çorum
- Karaağaç, Çorum
- Karabayır, Çorum
- Karabürçek, Çorum
- Karaca, Çorum
- Karacaören, Çorum
- Karadona, Çorum
- Karagöz, Çorum
- Karahisar, Çorum
- Karakeçili, Çorum
- Karapınar, Çorum
- Kavacık, Çorum
- Kayı, Çorum
- Kazıklıkaya, Çorum
- Kertme, Çorum
- Kılıçören, Çorum
- Kınık, Çorum
- Kınıkdeliler, Çorum
- Kiranlık, Çorum
- Kirazlıpınar, Çorum
- Kireçocağı, Çorum
- Kırkdilim, Çorum
- Kızılpınar, Çorum
- Konaklı, Çorum
- Köprüalan, Çorum
- Kozluca, Çorum
- Küçükdüvenci, Çorum
- Küçükgülücek, Çorum
- Küçükpalabıyık, Çorum
- Kultak, Çorum
- Kumçeltiği, Çorum
- Kuruçay, Çorum
- Kuşsaray, Çorum
- Kutluca, Çorum
- Laloğlu, Çorum
- Mecidiyekavak, Çorum
- Mislerovacığı, Çorum
- Mollahasan, Çorum
- Morsümbül, Çorum
- Mühürler, Çorum
- Mustafaçelebi, Çorum
- Narlık, Çorum
- Öksüzler, Çorum
- Ömerbey, Çorum
- Örencik, Çorum
- Osmaniye, Çorum
- Ovasaray, Çorum
- Oymaağaç, Çorum
- Palabıyık, Çorum
- Pancarlık, Çorum
- Paşa, Çorum
- Pembecik, Çorum
- Pınarçay, Çorum
- Pınarcık, Çorum
- Şahinkaya, Çorum
- Salur, Çorum
- Şanlıosman, Çorum
- Sapa, Çorum
- Saraylı, Çorum
- Sarıkaya, Çorum
- Sarılık, Çorum
- Sarımbey, Çorum
- Sarışeyh, Çorum
- Sarmaşa, Çorum
- Sazak, Çorum
- Sazdeğirmeni, Çorum
- Şekerbey, Çorum
- Şendere, Çorum
- Serban, Çorum
- Serpin, Çorum
- Sevindikalanı, Çorum
- Seydim, Çorum
- Seydimçakallı, Çorum
- Seyfe, Çorum
- Şeyhhamza, Çorum
- Şeyhmustafa, Çorum
- Sırıklı, Çorum
- Soğuksu, Çorum
- Tarhan, Çorum
- Tarhankozlusu, Çorum
- Taşpınar, Çorum
- Tatar, Çorum
- Teslim, Çorum
- Tolamehmet, Çorum
- Tozluburun, Çorum
- Turgut, Çorum
- Türkayşe, Çorum
- Türkler, Çorum
- Üçköy, Çorum
- Uğrak, Çorum
- Ülkenpınarı, Çorum
- Üyük, Çorum
- Yakuparpa, Çorum
- Yaydiğin, Çorum
- Yenice, Çorum
- Yenihayat, Çorum
- Yenikaradona, Çorum
- Yeşildere, Çorum
- Yeşilyayla, Çorum

== Alaca ==
- Alaca
- Akçaköy, Alaca
- Akçiçek, Alaca
- Akören, Alaca
- Akpınar, Alaca
- Alacahöyük, Alaca
- Altıntaş, Alaca
- Bahçeli, Alaca
- Balçıkhisar, Alaca
- Belpınar, Alaca
- Beşiktepe, Alaca
- Boğaziçi, Alaca
- Bolatçık, Alaca
- Bozdoğan, Alaca
- Büyükcamili, Alaca
- Büyükdona, Alaca
- Büyükhırka, Alaca
- Büyükkeşlik, Alaca
- Büyüksöğütözü, Alaca
- Çal, Alaca
- Çatak, Alaca
- Çatalbaş, Alaca
- Çatalkaya, Alaca
- Çelebibağ, Alaca
- Çetederesi, Alaca
- Çevreli, Alaca
- Çikhasan, Alaca
- Çırçır, Alaca
- Çöplü, Alaca
- Çöplüavutmuş, Alaca
- Çopraşık, Alaca
- Dedepınar, Alaca
- Değirmendere, Alaca
- Değirmenönü, Alaca
- Dereyazıcı, Alaca
- Eren, Alaca
- Eskiyapar, Alaca
- Evci, Alaca
- Fakılar, Alaca
- Gazipaşa, Alaca
- Gerdekkaya, Alaca
- Geven, Alaca
- Gökören, Alaca
- Gülderesi, Alaca
- Harhar, Alaca
- Haydar, Alaca
- İbrahim, Alaca
- İsahacı, Alaca
- İsmailli, Alaca
- Kalecikkaya, Alaca
- Kapaklı, Alaca
- Karaçal, Alaca
- Karatepe, Alaca
- Kargın, Alaca
- Karnıkara, Alaca
- Kayabüvet, Alaca
- Kıcılı, Alaca
- Kılavuz, Alaca
- Killik, Alaca
- Kızıllı, Alaca
- Kızılyar, Alaca
- Kızkaraca, Alaca
- Koçhisar, Alaca
- Körpınar, Alaca
- Koyunoğlu, Alaca
- Küçükcamili, Alaca
- Küçükhırka, Alaca
- Küçükkeşlik, Alaca
- Külah, Alaca
- Küre, Alaca
- Kürkçü, Alaca
- Kuyluş, Alaca
- Kuyumcusaray, Alaca
- Kuzkışla, Alaca
- Mahmudiye, Alaca
- Mazıbaşı, Alaca
- Miyanesultan, Alaca
- Onbaşılar, Alaca
- Örükaya, Alaca
- Perçem, Alaca
- Sancı, Alaca
- Sarısüleyman, Alaca
- Seyitnizam, Alaca
- Sincan, Alaca
- Soğucak, Alaca
- Sultan, Alaca
- Suludere, Alaca
- Tahirabat, Alaca
- Tevfikiye, Alaca
- Tutaş, Alaca
- Tutluca, Alaca
- Ünalan, Alaca
- Yatankavak, Alaca
- Yenice, Alaca
- Yeniköy, Alaca
- Yeşilyurt, Alaca
- Yüksekyayla, Alaca

== Bayat ==
- Bayat
- Ahacık, Bayat
- Aşağı Emirhalil, Bayat
- Ayvalıca, Bayat
- Barak, Bayat
- Bayan, Bayat
- Belören, Bayat
- Beydili, Bayat
- Çamlıgüney, Bayat
- Çayköy, Bayat
- Çerkeş, Bayat
- Cevizli, Bayat
- Çukuröz, Bayat
- Demirciler, Bayat
- Derekutuğun, Bayat
- Dorukseki, Bayat
- Emirhalil, Bayat
- Emirşah, Bayat
- Eskialibey, Bayat
- Evci, Bayat
- Falı, Bayat
- Hacıbayram, Bayat
- İleği, Bayat
- İshaklı, Bayat
- Kalınpelit, Bayat
- Karakaya, Bayat
- Köpüklü, Bayat
- Kubbedin, Bayat
- Kunduzlu, Bayat
- Kuruçay, Bayat
- Sağpazar, Bayat
- Saray, Bayat
- Tepekutuğun, Bayat
- Tevekli, Bayat
- Toyhane, Bayat
- Yeniköy, Bayat
- Yenişıhlar, Bayat
- Yeşilçat, Bayat
- Yoncalı, Bayat

== Boğazkale ==
- Boğazkale
- Emirler, Boğazkale
- Evci, Boğazkale
- Gölpınarlar, Boğazkale
- Kadılıtürk, Boğazkale
- Karakeçili, Boğazkale
- Kaymaz, Boğazkale
- Örenkaya, Boğazkale
- Sarıçiçek, Boğazkale
- Yanıcak, Boğazkale
- Yazır, Boğazkale
- Yekbas, Boğazkale
- Yenikadılı, Boğazkale
- Yukarıfındıklı, Boğazkale

== Dodurga ==
- Dodurga
- Akkaya, Dodurga
- Alpagut, Dodurga
- Ayvaköy, Dodurga
- Berkköy, Dodurga
- Çiftlikköy, Dodurga
- Dikenli, Dodurga
- Kirenci, Dodurga
- Kuyucak, Dodurga
- Mehmetdedeobruğu, Dodurga
- Mehmetdedetekkesi, Dodurga
- Tutuş, Dodurga
- Yeniköy, Dodurga

== İskilip ==
- İskilip
- Ahlatcık, İskilip
- Ahmetce, İskilip
- Akcasu, İskilip
- Akpınar, İskilip
- Aluç, İskilip
- Aşağıörenseki, İskilip
- Aşağışeyhler, İskilip
- Asarcık, İskilip
- Avhatyaka, İskilip
- Başmakcı, İskilip
- Beyoğlan, İskilip
- Çatkara, İskilip
- Çavuşoğlu, İskilip
- Çetmi, İskilip
- Çomu, İskilip
- Çukurköy, İskilip
- Dağkıyısı, İskilip
- Derekarkın, İskilip
- Dereseki, İskilip
- Doğangir, İskilip
- Elmalı, İskilip
- Eskiköy, İskilip
- Göl, İskilip
- Güneyaluç, İskilip
- Hacıhalil, İskilip
- Hallı, İskilip
- Harun, İskilip
- İbik, İskilip
- İkikise, İskilip
- İkipınar, İskilip
- Karaağaç, İskilip
- Karaburun, İskilip
- Karaçukur, İskilip
- Karagöz, İskilip
- Karlık, İskilip
- Karmış, İskilip
- Kavak, İskilip
- Kayaağzı, İskilip
- Kılıçdere, İskilip
- Kızılcabayır, İskilip
- Kurusaray, İskilip
- Kutluözü, İskilip
- Kuz Köyü, İskilip
- Kuzuluk, İskilip
- Musular, İskilip
- Onaç, İskilip
- Örübağ, İskilip
- Saraycık, İskilip
- Sarıkavak, İskilip
- Şehirkuruçay, İskilip
- Seki, İskilip
- Şeyh, İskilip
- Seyirçay, İskilip
- Soğucak, İskilip
- Sorkun, İskilip
- Suhilan, İskilip
- Yalak, İskilip
- Yalakçay, İskilip
- Yanoğlan, İskilip
- Yavu, İskilip
- Yaylacıkseki, İskilip
- Yenice, İskilip
- Yerli, İskilip
- Yukarıörenseki, İskilip

== Kargı ==
- Kargı
- Abdullah, Kargı
- Akçataş, Kargı
- Akkaya, Kargı
- Akkise, Kargı
- Alioğlu, Kargı
- Arık, Kargı
- Avşar, Kargı
- Bademce, Kargı
- Bağözü, Kargı
- Başköy, Kargı
- Bayat, Kargı
- Beygircioğlu, Kargı
- Bozarmut, Kargı
- Çakırlar, Kargı
- Çal, Kargı
- Çeltiközü, Kargı
- Çetmi, Kargı
- Cihadiye, Kargı
- Çobankaya, Kargı
- Çobanlar, Kargı
- Çukuraluç, Kargı
- Demirören, Kargı
- Dereköy, Kargı
- Gökbudak, Kargı
- Gökçedoğan, Kargı
- Göl, Kargı
- Gölet, Kargı
- Göletdere, Kargı
- Gümüşoğlu, Kargı
- Güney, Kargı
- Günyazı, Kargı
- Hacıhamza, Kargı
- Hacıveli, Kargı
- Halılar, Kargı
- İnceçay, Kargı
- Kabakcı, Kargı
- Karaboya, Kargı
- Karacaoğlan, Kargı
- Karakise, Kargı
- Karaosmanlı, Kargı
- Karapürçek, Kargı
- Kavakçayı, Kargı
- Köprübaşı, Kargı
- Koyunkıran, Kargı
- Maksutlu, Kargı
- Örencik, Kargı
- Pelitcik, Kargı
- Pelitözü, Kargı
- Saraçlar, Kargı
- Saraycık, Kargı
- Seki, Kargı
- Sinanözü, Kargı
- Sünlük, Kargı
- Tepelice, Kargı
- Uğuz, Kargı
- Uzunyurt, Kargı
- Yağcılar, Kargı
- Yeşilköy, Kargı

== Laçin ==
- Laçin
- Çamlıca, Laçin
- Çamlıpınar, Laçin
- Doğanlar, Laçin
- Gökçekaya, Laçin
- Gökgözler, Laçin
- Gözübüyük, Laçin
- İkizce, Laçin
- Karasoku, Laçin
- Kavaklıçiftlik, Laçin
- Kuyumcu, Laçin
- Narlı, Laçin
- Sıtma, Laçin
- Yeşilpınar, Laçin

== Mecitözü ==
- Mecitözü
- Ağcakoyun, Mecitözü
- Akpınar, Mecitözü
- Alancık, Mecitözü
- Alören, Mecitözü
- Aşağıkörücek, Mecitözü
- Bayındır, Mecitözü
- Bekişler, Mecitözü
- Beyözü, Mecitözü
- Boğazkaya, Mecitözü
- Boyacı, Mecitözü
- Bükse, Mecitözü
- Çayköy, Mecitözü
- Çitli, Mecitözü
- Dağsaray, Mecitözü
- Devletoğlan, Mecitözü
- Doğla, Mecitözü
- Elmapınar, Mecitözü
- Elvançelebi, Mecitözü
- Emirbağı, Mecitözü
- Fakıahmet, Mecitözü
- Figani, Mecitözü
- Fındıklı, Mecitözü
- Geykoca, Mecitözü
- Gökçebel, Mecitözü
- Güngörmez, Mecitözü
- Hisarkavak, Mecitözü
- İbek, Mecitözü
- Işıklı, Mecitözü
- Kalecik, Mecitözü
- Karacaören, Mecitözü
- Karacuma, Mecitözü
- Kargı, Mecitözü
- Kayı, Mecitözü
- Kışlacık, Mecitözü
- Konaç, Mecitözü
- Köprübaşı, Mecitözü
- Körücek, Mecitözü
- Köseeyüp, Mecitözü
- Koyunağılı, Mecitözü
- Kozören, Mecitözü
- Kuyucak, Mecitözü
- Pınarbaşı, Mecitözü
- Sarıhasan, Mecitözü
- Sırçalı, Mecitözü
- Söğütönü, Mecitözü
- Söğütyol, Mecitözü
- Sorkoğlan, Mecitözü
- Sülüklü, Mecitözü
- Tanrıvermiş, Mecitözü
- Terken, Mecitözü
- Totali, Mecitözü
- Vakıflar, Mecitözü
- Yedigöz, Mecitözü
- Yeşilova, Mecitözü

== Oğuzlar ==
- Oğuzlar
- Ağaççamı, Oğuzlar
- Asarçayı, Oğuzlar
- Cevizli, Oğuzlar
- Derinöz, Oğuzlar
- Erenler, Oğuzlar
- Kayı, Oğuzlar
- Şaphane, Oğuzlar

== Ortaköy ==
- Ortaköy
- Asar, Ortaköy
- Aşdağul, Ortaköy
- Büyükkışla, Ortaköy
- Cevizli, Ortaköy
- Esentepe, Ortaköy
- Fındıklı, Ortaköy
- İncesu, Ortaköy
- Karahacip, Ortaköy
- Kavakalan, Ortaköy
- Kızılhamza, Ortaköy
- Oruçpınar, Ortaköy
- Salbaş, Ortaköy
- Senemoğlu, Ortaköy
- Yaylacık, Ortaköy
- Yukarı Kuyucak, Ortaköy

== Osmancık ==
- Osmancık
- Ağıroğlan, Osmancık
- Akören, Osmancık
- Alibey, Osmancık
- Ardıç, Osmancık
- Aşağızeytin, Osmancık
- Aşıkbükü, Osmancık
- Avlağı, Osmancık
- Aydın, Osmancık
- Baldıran, Osmancık
- Baltacımehmetpaşa, Osmancık
- Başpınar, Osmancık
- Belkavak, Osmancık
- Çampınar, Osmancık
- Çatak, Osmancık
- Çayır, Osmancık
- Danişment, Osmancık
- Deller, Osmancık
- Doğan, Osmancık
- Durucasu, Osmancık
- Evlik, Osmancık
- Fındıcak, Osmancık
- Fındık, Osmancık
- Gecek, Osmancık
- Girinoğlan, Osmancık
- Gökdere, Osmancık
- Güneşören, Osmancık
- Güvercinlik, Osmancık
- Hanefi, Osmancık
- İnal, Osmancık
- İncesu, Osmancık
- Kamil, Osmancık
- Karaçay, Osmancık
- Karaköy, Osmancık
- Karalargüney, Osmancık
- Kargı, Osmancık
- Kızıltepe, Osmancık
- Konaca, Osmancık
- Kumbaba, Osmancık
- Kuzalibey, Osmancık
- Kuzhayat, Osmancık
- Öbektaş, Osmancık
- Ovacıksuyu, Osmancık
- Pelitçik, Osmancık
- Sarıalan, Osmancık
- Sarpunkavak, Osmancık
- Seki, Osmancık
- Sekibağı, Osmancık
- Sütlüce, Osmancık
- Tekmen, Osmancık
- Tepeyolaltı, Osmancık
- Umaç, Osmancık
- Yağsüzen, Osmancık
- Yaylabaşı, Osmancık
- Yenidanişment, Osmancık
- Yukarızeytin, Osmancık

== Sungurlu ==
- Sungurlu
- Akçakoyunlu, Sungurlu
- Akçalı, Sungurlu
- Akdere, Sungurlu
- Akpınar, Sungurlu
- Alembeyli, Sungurlu
- Arabaçayı, Sungurlu
- Arıcı, Sungurlu
- Arifegazili, Sungurlu
- Aşağıbeşpınar, Sungurlu
- Aşağıfındıklı, Sungurlu
- Asayiş, Sungurlu
- Ayağıbüyük, Sungurlu
- Aydoğan, Sungurlu
- Bağcılı, Sungurlu
- Bağdatlı, Sungurlu
- Bahşılı, Sungurlu
- Balkaya, Sungurlu
- Beşdam, Sungurlu
- Beşkız, Sungurlu
- Beylice, Sungurlu
- Beyyurdu, Sungurlu
- Boztepe, Sungurlu
- Bozyayla, Sungurlu
- Bunalan, Sungurlu
- Büyükincesu, Sungurlu
- Büyükpolatlı, Sungurlu
- Çamoluk, Sungurlu
- Çavuşçu, Sungurlu
- Çavuşköy, Sungurlu
- Çayan, Sungurlu
- Çayyaka, Sungurlu
- Cevheri, Sungurlu
- Çiçekli, Sungurlu
- Çiçeklikeller, Sungurlu
- Çiftlikköy, Sungurlu
- Çingiller, Sungurlu
- Çukurlu, Sungurlu
- Çulhalı, Sungurlu
- Dayıncık, Sungurlu
- Demirşeyh, Sungurlu
- Denizli, Sungurlu
- Derekışla, Sungurlu
- Dertli, Sungurlu
- Ekmekçi, Sungurlu
- Eşme, Sungurlu
- Gafurlu, Sungurlu
- Gökçam, Sungurlu
- Gökçeköy, Sungurlu
- Göller, Sungurlu
- Güvendik, Sungurlu
- Hacıosman, Sungurlu
- Hilallı, Sungurlu
- İkizli, Sungurlu
- İmirli, Sungurlu
- İnegazili, Sungurlu
- Kaledere, Sungurlu
- Kalenderoğlu, Sungurlu
- Kamışlı, Sungurlu
- Karacabey, Sungurlu
- Karaçay, Sungurlu
- Karakaya, Sungurlu
- Karakocalı, Sungurlu
- Karaoğlu, Sungurlu
- Kavşut, Sungurlu
- Kemalli, Sungurlu
- Kertme, Sungurlu
- Kırankışla, Sungurlu
- Kışlaköy, Sungurlu
- Körkü, Sungurlu
- Küçükincesu, Sungurlu
- Küçükpolatlı, Sungurlu
- Kula, Sungurlu
- Kurbağlı, Sungurlu
- Kuşçalı, Sungurlu
- Kuzucak, Sungurlu
- Mahmatlı, Sungurlu
- Mehmetaliçiftliği, Sungurlu
- Mehmetbeyli, Sungurlu
- Muratkolu, Sungurlu
- Oğlaközü, Sungurlu
- Ortakışla, Sungurlu
- Ortaköy, Sungurlu
- Oyaca, Sungurlu
- Salmanköy, Sungurlu
- Saraycık, Sungurlu
- Sarıcalar, Sungurlu
- Sarıkaya, Sungurlu
- Şekerhacılı, Sungurlu
- Tatlı, Sungurlu
- Tatlısu, Sungurlu
- Terzili, Sungurlu
- Tokullu, Sungurlu
- Topuz, Sungurlu
- Tuğcu, Sungurlu
- Tuğlu, Sungurlu
- Turgutlu, Sungurlu
- Türkhacılarhanı, Sungurlu
- Üçoluk, Sungurlu
- Yarımsöğüt, Sungurlu
- Yenihacılarhanı, Sungurlu
- Yeşilova, Sungurlu
- Yeşilyurt, Sungurlu
- Yirce, Sungurlu
- Yorgalı, Sungurlu
- Yörüklü, Sungurlu
- Yukarıbeşpınar, Sungurlu

== Uğurludağ ==
- Uğurludağ
- Anbarcı, Uğurludağ
- Aşılıarmut, Uğurludağ
- Boztepe, Uğurludağ
- Büyükerikli, Uğurludağ
- Dağönü, Uğurludağ
- Eskiçeltek, Uğurludağ
- Gökçeağaç, Uğurludağ
- Karaevliya, Uğurludağ
- Karakısık, Uğurludağ
- Kırköy, Uğurludağ
- Kızağlı, Uğurludağ
- Köpeç, Uğurludağ
- Küçükerikli, Uğurludağ
- Resuloğlu, Uğurludağ
- Sazköy, Uğurludağ
- Torunlar, Uğurludağ
- Üçdam, Uğurludağ
- Yarımca, Uğurludağ
- Yeniyapan, Uğurludağ
