= Kayı =

Kayı can refer to:

- Kayı (tribe)
- Kayı, Çorum
- Kayı, İdil
- Kayı, Ilgaz
- Kayı, Kemer
- Kayı, Mecitözü
- Kayı, Oğuzlar
