= Örencik =

Örencik can refer to the following villages in Turkey:

- Örencik, Bolu
- Örencik, Bozdoğan
- Örencik, Çorum
- Örencik, Daday
- Örencik, Gerede
- Örencik, Gölbaşı
- Örencik, Göynük
- Örencik, Hocalar
- Örencik, Karacabey
- Örencik, Kargı
- Örencik, Kastamonu
- Örencik, Kazan
- Örencik, Kızılcahamam
- Örencik, Mudurnu
- Örencik, Palu
- Örencik, Şanlıurfa
- Örencik, Vezirköprü
- Örencik, Yenice
- Örencik, Yeşilova
- Örencik, Zonguldak
