= Eymir =

Eymir may refer to:

== Iran ==
- Eymir, Iran (disambiguation)

== Turkey ==
- Eymir, Çorum
- Eymir, Nallıhan, Ankara Province
- Eymir, Elmalı, Antalya Province
- Eymir, Merzifon, Amasya Province
- Eymir, Gercüş, Batman Province
- Lake Eymir, in Ankara Province
