= Kertme =

Kertme can refer to:

- Kertme, Çorum
- Kertme, Göynücek
- Kertme, Sungurlu
