= Karakeçili (disambiguation) =

Karakeçili can refer to:

- Karakeçili
- Karakeçili, Boğazkale
- Karakeçili, Çorum
