= Kuruçay =

Kuruçay may refer to the following settlements in Turkey:

- Kuruçay, Bayat, a village in Çorum Province
- Kuruçay, Burdur, a village in Burdur Province
- Kuruçay, Çorum, a village in Çorum Province
- Kuruçay, Çubuk, a neighbourhood in Ankara Province
- Kuruçay, Derik, a village in Mardin Province
- Kuruçay, İliç, a village in Erzincan Province
- Kuruçay, Oğuzeli or Kafersarı, a village in Gaziantep Province
- Kuruçay, Tavşanlı, a town in Kütahya Province
- Kuruçay, Vezirköprü, a neighbourhood in Samsun Province
