= Eskiköy =

Eskiköy (literally "old village" in Turkish) may refer to one of the following places in Turkey:

- Eskiköy, Acıpayam
- Eskiköy, Çorum
- Eskiköy, Baskil
- Eskiköy, İnegöl
- Eskiköy, İskilip
- Eskiköy, Kalecik, a village in Ankara Province
- Eskiköy, Silvan
- Eskiköy, Sincik, a village in Adıyaman Province
