= Derinöz =

Derinöz can refer to:

- Derinöz, Oğuzlar
- Derinöz Dam
