= Mollahasan =

Mollahasan can refer to:

- Mollahasan, Çorum
- Mollahasan, Göle
