= Serpin (disambiguation) =

Serpins are a superfamily of proteins.

Serpin may also refer to:

- Serpin, Çorum, village in Turkey
- Sierpin, village in Poland
