= Çukurören =

Çukurören may refer to the following places in Turkey:

- Çukurören, Bilecik
- Çukurören, Bolu
- Çukurören, Çamlıdere
- Çukurören, Çorum
- Çukurören, Gölpazarı
- Çukurören, Güdül
- Çukurören, Kızılcahamam
- Çukurören, Korgun
- Çukurören, Kozan
- Çukurören, Suluova
- Çukurören, Yığılca
