= Üyük =

Üyük can refer to:

- Üyük, Çorum
- Üyük, Gölpazarı
