= Hacımusa =

Hacımusa can refer to:

- Hacımusa, Çorum
- Hacımusa, Gökçebey
- Hacımusa, Polatlı
