= Narlık =

Narlık can refer to:

- Narlık, Ceyhan
- Narlık, Çorum
- Narlık, Yusufeli
