= Aksungur =

Aksungur is a Turkish word for gyrfalcon. It may refer to:

== History ==
- Turkish name used for the Ahmadilis.

== People ==
- Aq Sunqur al-Hajib, Seljuk governor of Aleppo

== Places ==
- Aksungur, Çorum, Turkey
- Aksungur, Merzifon, a village in Merzifon district of Amasya Province, Turkey
- Aksungur, Osmangazi, Turkey
- Lütfullah Aksungur Sports Hall, indoor arena for handball competitions in Adana, Turkey

== Other uses ==
- TAI Aksungur, an unmanned aerial vehicle (UAV) in development by the Turkish Aerospace Industries (TAI)
