= Acıpınar =

Acıpınar can refer to:

- Acıpınar, Aksaray
- Acıpınar, Çorum
