= Sırıklı =

Sırıklı can refer to:

- Sırıklı, Bekilli
- Sırıklı, Çorum
