= Saraylı =

Saraylı can refer to:

- Saraylı, Bartın
- Saraylı, Çorum
