= İğdeli =

İğdeli can refer to:

- İğdeli, Burdur
- İğdeli, Çorum
- İğdeli, Horasan
- İğdeli, Kovancılar
- İğdeli, Oltu
- İğdeli, Şenkaya
- İğdeli, Sinanpaşa
