= Seyfe =

Seyfe can refer to:

- Seyfe, Çorum
- Seyfe, Suluova
