= Taşpınar =

Taşpınar (literally "rock springs") is a Turkish place name and may refer to:

- Angolemi, a village in northern Cyprus, whose Turkish name is Taşpınar
- Taşpınar, Aksaray, a town in Aksaray Province, Turkey
- Taşpınar, Adıyaman, a town in Adıyaman Province, Turkey
- Taşpınar, Aziziye
- Taşpınar, Çorum
- Taşpınar, Çubuk, a village in Ankara Province, Turkey
- Taşpınar, Gölbaşı, a village in Ankara Province, Turkey
- Taşpınar, Polatlı, a village in Ankara Province, Turkey
- Taşpınar, Silvan
- Taşpınar, Tufanbeyli, a village in Adana Province, Turkey
- Taşpınar, Yeşilova
