= Çaltıcak =

Çaltıcak can refer to:

- Çaltıcak, Çorum
- Çaltıcak, Dursunbey
