= Şekerbey =

Şekerbey can refer to:

- Şəkərbəy
- Şekerbey, Çorum
