= Yenihayat =

Yenihayat can refer to:

- Yenihayat, Çorum
- Yenihayat Dam
