= Eskice =

Eskice can refer to:

- Eskice, Çorum
- Eskice, Ilgaz
- Eskice, Kozluk
