= Atçalı =

Atçalı can refer to:

- Atçalı, Çorum
- Atçalı Kel Mehmet
