= Belören =

Belören may refer to:

- Belören, Bayat
- Belören, Demre, village in Antalya Province, Turkey
- Belören, Gölbaşı, village in Adıyaman Province, Turkey
- Belören, Ilgaz
- Belören, Kahta, village in Adıyaman Province, Turkey
- Belören, Yüreğir, village in Adana Province, Turkey
