= Çanakçı (disambiguation) =

Çanakçı can refer to:

- Çanakçı
- Çanakçı, Çorum
- Çanakçı, Dursunbey
- Çanakçı, Karakoçan
- Çanakçı, Kemaliye
- Çanakçı rock tombs
