= Kınık (disambiguation) =

Kınık can refer to:

- Kınık, district of İzmir Province of Turkey
- Kınık, Akçakoca
- Kınık, Çorum
- Kınık, İnegöl
- Kınık, İvrindi, a village in Turkey
- Kınık, Sındırgı, a village
- Kınık, Tosya, a village in Turkey
- Kınık (tribe), an Oghuz Turkic tribe
