= Harmancık (disambiguation) =

Harmancık can refer to:

- Harmancık
- Harmancık, Bayramören
- Harmancık, Çorum
- Harmancık, Lapseki
