= Essence (disambiguation) =

Essence is the attribute (or set of attributes) that make an object or substance what it fundamentally is.

Essence may also refer to:

== Arts and entertainment ==
=== Television and film ===
- The Essence, a short film series by Nathaniel Thompson
- "Essence" (The X-Files), a 2001 episode of television show The X-Files

=== Music ===
- Essence (John Lewis album), 1962
- Essence (Don Ellis album), 1962
- Essence (Eric Kloss album), 1973
- Essence (Shelly Manne album), 1977
- Essence, a pseudonym of The Space Brothers, a UK trance music act
- Essence (A Guy Called Gerald album), 2000
- Essence (Lucinda Williams album), 2001
  - Essence (Lucinda Williams song)
- "Essence" (Wizkid song), a 2020 song by Wizkid featuring Tems

=== Videogames ===
- a measure of a living being's lifeforce in the role-playing game Shadowrun
- the mystical force in the pen and paper role-playing game Exalted

== Other uses ==
- Essence (biological defense program), a United States Department of Defense health-protection initiative
- Essence (magazine), an African American magazine with a primarily female readership
- Essence (yacht), an American yacht sank in a collision with a cargo ship on 29 April 2009
- Essential oil, of a given substance
- Essence, a French language term used in some parts of Africa to refer to gasoline
- Essence, a software development method and Object Management Group standard related to SEMAT
- Extract, used as a food flavoring

== See also ==
- Esence (disambiguation)
