= Ovasaray =

Ovasaray can refer to:

- Ovasaray, Amasya
- Ovasaray, Çorum
