= Kutluca =

Kutluca may refer to:

- Kutluca, Besni, a village in the district of Besni, Adıyaman Province
- Kutluca, Çorum
- Kutluca, Gümüşhacıköy, a village in the district of Gümüşhacıköy, Amasya Province
- Kutluca, İznik
- Kutluca, Kemaliye
