= Ayvalı =

Ayvalı may refer to:

== Places ==
- Ayvalı, Çorum
- Ayvalı, İmamoğlu, a village in İmamoğlu district of Adana Province, Turkey
- Ayvalı, Oltu
- Ayvalı, Sinanpaşa, a village in Sinanpaşa district of Afyonkarahisar Province, Turkey
- Ayvalı, Vezirköprü, a village in Vezirköprü district of Samsun Province, Turkey
- Ayvalı, Yüreğir, a village in the District of Yüreğir, Adana Province, Turkey

== Other uses ==
- Ayvalı Dam, a dam in Kahramanmaraş Province, Turkey
