= Çalıca =

Çalıca can refer to:

- Çalıca, Çorum
- Çalıca, Elâzığ
- Çalıca, Gönen
