= Kavacık =

Kavacık can refer to the following villages in Turkey:

- Kavacık, Bayburt
- Kavacık, Beykoz, Istanbul
- Kavacık, Bucak
- Kavacık, Burdur
- Kavacık, Çorum
- Kavacık, Dursunbey
- Kavacık, Gerede
- Kavacık, Kemaliye
- Kavacık, Mengen
- Kavacık, Nazilli
- Kavacık, Yenipazar
