= Gökçepınar =

Gökçepınar can refer to the following villages in Turkey:

- Gökçepınar, Çorum
- Gökçepınar, Dursunbey
- Gökçepınar, Gercüş
- Gökçepınar, Serik
