= Çağşak =

Çağşak can refer to:

- Çağşak, Çorum
- Çağşak, Mudurnu
