= Kireçocağı =

Kireçocağı can refer to:

- Kireçocağı, Çorum
- Kireçocağı, Seyhan
