= Arpalık =

Arpalık can refer to:

- Arpalik
- Arpalık, Çorum
