= Değirmendere =

Değirmendere is a Turkish place name meaning "mill river" and may refer to:

== Places ==
- Değirmendere, Alanya, a village in Alanya district of Antalya Province
- Değirmendere, Amasya, a village in the central district of Amasya
- Değirmendere, Balya, a village
- Değirmenderesi, Bolu, a village in the central district of Bolu Province
- Değirmendere, Ceyhan, a village in Ceyhan district of Adana Province
- Değirmendere, Çorum, a village in the district of Çorum
- Değirmendere, Ergani, a village
- Değirmendere, Gölcük, a former town and modern quarter in Gölcük district of Kocaeli Province
- Değirmendere, İspir, a village in the district of İspir
- Değirmendere, Mersin, a village in Toroslar district of Mersin Province

== Other uses ==
- TCG Değirmendere (A-576), a tugboat of the Turkish Navy
