= Hacıbey =

Hacıbey can refer to:

- Hacıbey, Alaşehir, neighborhood in Alaşehir, Turkey
- Hacıbey, Çorum, village in Turkey
- Hacıbey, Kastamonu, village in Turkey
- Hacıbey, Nallıhan, neighborhood in Ankara, Turkey
- Turkish spelling of Khadjibey

== See also ==
- Hajibey (disambiguation)
