= Akçakaya =

Akçakaya (literally "quite white rock") is a Turkish place name that may refer to the following places in Turkey:

- Akçakaya, Altıeylül, a village
- Akçakaya, Çorum
- Akçakaya, Gölbaşı, a village in the district of Gölbaşı, Adıyaman Province
- Akçakaya, Söke, a village in the district of Söke, Aydın Province
