= Burunköy =

Burunköy can refer to:

- Burunköy, Çorum
- Burunköy, Mut
