= Kızılpınar =

Kızılpınar can refer to:

- Kızılpınar, Çerkezköy
- Kızılpınar, Çorum
- Kızılpınar, Karakoçan
