= Üçköy =

Üçköy can refer to:

- Üçköy, Çorum, a village in the Corum district of Corum province, Turkey
- Üçköy, Kozlu, a village in the Kozlu district of Zonguldak Province, Turkey
- Üçköy, Nusaybin, a neighborhood in the Nusaybin district of Mardin Province, Turkey
