= Salbaş =

Salbaş can refer to:

- Salbaş, Karaisalı
- Salbaş, Ortaköy
