= Altınbaş =

Altınbaş can refer to:

- Altınbaş, Çorum
- Altınbaş University
