= Gökköy =

Gökköy can refer to:

- Gökköy, Altıeylül, a village in Turkey
- Gökköy, Çorum
- Gökköy, Lapseki
- Gökköy railway station, a railway station near to the village
