= Uğrak =

Uğrak can refer to the following villages in Turkey:

- Uğrak, Alanya
- Uğrak, Bayburt
- Uğrak, Beşiri
- Uğrak, Bismil
- Uğrak, Çorum
- Uğrak, Dicle
- Uğrak, İnebolu
