= Çorak =

Çorak (literally "barren" or "arid") is a Turkish place name that may refer to the following places in Turkey:

- Çorak, Bayburt, a village in the district of Bayburt, Bayburt Province
- Çorak, Besni, a village in the district of Besni, Adıyaman Province
- Çorak, Çorum
- Çorak, Saimbeyli, a village in the Saimbeyli, Adana Province
