= Feruz =

Feruz can refer to:

- Feruz, Çorum
- a pen name of Muhammad Rahim Khan II of Khiva
