= Büyükkışla =

Büyükkışla may refer to:

- Büyükkışla, Ortaköy
- Büyükkışla, Şereflikoçhisar
