= Esence =

Esence is the name of several places in Turkey:

- Esence, Adıyaman
- Esence, Afşin
- Esence, Alpu
- Esence, Beşiri
- Esence, Beyşehir
- Esence, Kemaliye
- Esence, Kumru
- Esence, Mudanya
- Esence, Niksar
- Esence, Şenkaya

== See also ==
- Esençay (disambiguation)
- Essence (disambiguation)
