= Oymaağaç =

Oymaağaç may refer to:

- Oymaağaç, Ağaçören, village in Aksaray Province, Turkey
- Oymaağaç, Bayramören
- Oymaağaç, Beypazarı, village in Ankara Province, Turkey
- Oymaağaç, Çorum
- Oymaağaç, Elâzığ
- Oymaağaç, Merzifon, village in Amasya Province, Turkey
- Oymaağaç, Vezirköprü, village in Samsun Province, Turkey
