= Pınarcık =

Pınarcık may refer to:

- Pınarcık, Çorum
- Pınarcık, Demirözü
- Pınarcık, Serik
- Pınarcık massacre
