= Köprüalan =

Köprüalan can refer to:

- Köprüalan, Çorum
- Köprüalan, Söke
