= Pembecik =

Pembecik can refer to:

- Pembecik, Aydıncık
- Pembecik, Çorum
