= Büğdüz =

Büğdüz can refer to the following places in Turkey:

- Büğdüz, Akyurt
- Büğdüz, Çorum
- Büğdüz, Orta
