= Büğet =

Büğet can refer to:

- Büğet, Çorum
- Büğet, Eskil
