= Babaoğlu =

Babaoğlu is a Turkish surname. Notable people with the surname include:

- Aydoğan Babaoğlu (born 1944), Turkish military officer
- Kenan Babaoğlu (born 1982), Turkish para archer
- Özalp Babaoğlu (born 1955), Turkish computer scientist

== See also ==
- Babaoğlu, Çorum
- Babaoğlu, İnegöl
