= Çıkrık =

Çıkrık may refer to the following places in Turkey:

- Çıkrık, Afyonkarahisar, a town in Afyonkarahisar Province
- Çıkrık, Çorum, a village in Çorum Province
