= Denizköy =

Denizköy (Turkish: "sea village") may refer to the following places in Turkey:

- Denizköy, Çorum
- Denizköy, Dikili, a village in the district of Dikili, İzmir Province
- Denizköy, Didim, a village in the District of Didim, Aydın Province
  - Denizköy VLF transmitter, a facility of the U.S. Navy in the village
