= Ortaköy District, Çorum =

District of Çorum Province, Turkey

Ortaköy District
- District
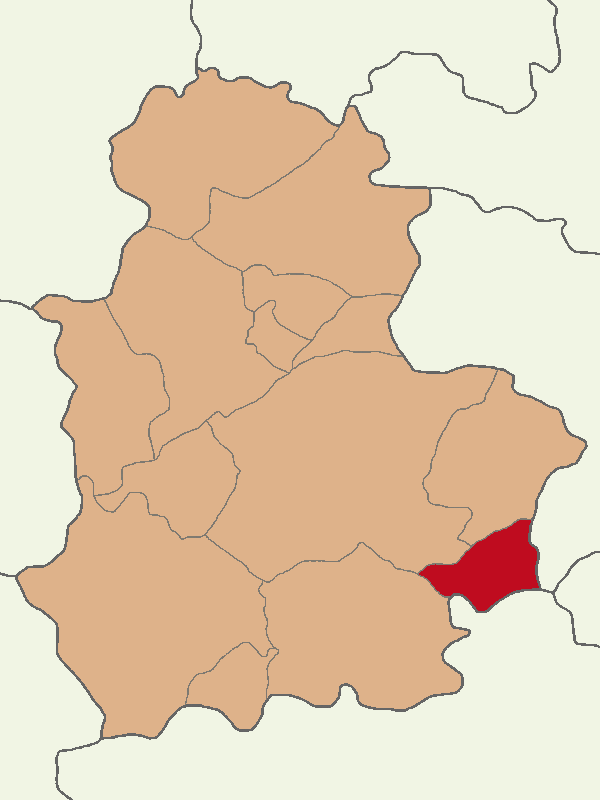
- Map showing Ortaköy District in Çorum Province

- Location in Turkey
- Coordinates: 40°49′N 33°04′E
- Country: Turkey
- Province: Çorum
- Seat: Ortaköy

Government
  - Kaymakam: Adem Can Okur
- Area: 300 km^{2} (100 sq mi)
- Population (2021): 6,425
  - Density: 21/km^{2} (55/sq mi)
- Time zone: UTC+3 (TRT)
- Website: www.corumortakoy.gov.tr

Ortaköy District is a district of the Çorum Province of Turkey. Its seat is the town of Ortaköy. Its area is 300 km^{2}, and its population is 6,425 (2021).

== Composition ==
There are two municipalities in Ortaköy District:

- Aştavul
- Ortaköy

There are 14 villages in Ortaköy District:

- Asar
- Büyükkışla
- Cevizli
- Esentepe
- Fındıklı
- İncesu
- Karahacip
- Kavakalan
- Kızılhamza
- Oruçpınar
- Salbaş
- Senemoğlu
- Yaylacık
- Yukarıkuyucak
