= Asarçay, Oğuzlar =

Village in Turkey

Asarçay
- Neighbourhood
- Location in Turkey
- Coordinates: 40°45′N 34°44′E
- Country: Turkey
- Province: Çorum
- District: Oğuzlar
- Municipality: Oğuzlar
- Population (2022): 98
- Time zone: UTC+3 (TRT)

Asarçay is a neighbourhood of the town Oğuzlar, Oğuzlar District, Çorum Province, Turkey. Its population is 98 (2022).
