= Bektaşoğlu, Çorum =

Village in Turkey

Bektaşoğlu
- Village
- Location in Turkey
- Coordinates: 40.4996°N 34.7290°E
- Country: Turkey
- Province: Çorum
- District: Çorum
- Population (2022): 32
- Time zone: UTC+3 (TRT)
- Postal code: 19010
- Area code: 0364
- Website: www.bektasoglukoyu.net

Bektaşoğlu (former name Belkaraağaç) is a village in the Çorum District of Çorum Province in Turkey. Its population is 32 (2022).

== History ==
The name of the village is mentioned as Belkaraağaç in the records of 1925. While it was previously a neighborhood of Seydimçakallı village, on 13 January 1956, it gained the village status by merging with the Oluközü and Borsunlu neighborhoods of the same village.

== Geography ==
The village is 27 km away from Çorum city center.

== Population ==
Historical population
Year	Pop.	±% p.a.
1985	151	—
1990	104	−7.19%
1997	90	−2.04%
2007	38	−8.26%
2012	32	−3.38%
2017	15	−14.06%
2022	32	+16.36%
Source: 1985 census, 1990 census, 1997 census and TÜIK (2007-2022)
