= Yoğunpelit, Çorum =

Village in Çorum, Turkey

Yoğunpelit
- Village
- Location in Turkey
- Coordinates: 40°28′00″N 35°01′27″E
- Country: Turkey
- Province: Çorum
- District: Çorum
- Elevation: 935 m (3,068 ft)
- Population (2022): 148
- Time zone: UTC+3 (TRT)
- Postal code: 19010

Yoğunpelit is a village in the Çorum District of Çorum Province in Turkey. Its population is 148 (2022).

Its earliest mention in surviving records is in 1925. The village is located about 18 kilometers southeast of Çorum, at an average altitude of 935 meters above the sea level.
