= Esençay =

Esençay (literally "windy stream" or "healthy stream" in Turkish) may refer to the following places in Turkey:

- Eşençay, Çorum
- Esençay, Karacasu, a village in the district of Karacasu, Aydın Province
- Esençay, Mut, a village in the district of Mut, Mersin Province
