= Çorum District =

District of Çorum Province, Turkey

- District
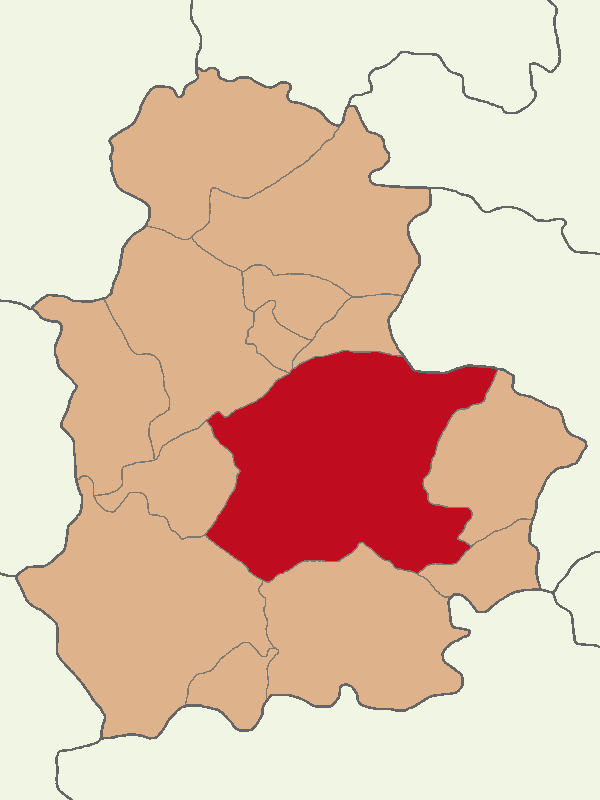
- Map showing Çorum District in Çorum Province

- Location in Turkey
- Coordinates: 40°33′N 34°57′E
- Country: Turkey
- Province: Çorum
- Seat: Çorum
- Area: 2,436 km^{2} (941 sq mi)
- Population (2022): 299,061
  - Density: 120/km^{2} (320/sq mi)
- Time zone: UTC+3 (TRT)

Çorum District (also: Merkez, meaning "central") is a district of the Çorum Province of Turkey. Its seat is the city of Çorum. Its area is 2,436 km^{2}, and its population is 299,061 (2022).

== Composition ==
There are two municipalities in Çorum District:

- Çorum
- Düvenci

There are 198 villages in Çorum District:

- Abdalata
- Acıpınar
- Ahiilyas
- Ahmediye
- Ahmetoğlan
- Akçakaya
- Aksungur
- Akyazı
- Altınbaş
- Arpalık
- Arpaöz
- Arslanköy
- Aşağısaraylı
- Atçalı
- Ayaz
- Ayvalı
- Babaoğlu
- Balıyakup
- Balumsultan
- Bektaşoğlu
- Beydili
- Boğabağı
- Boğacık
- Boğazönü
- Bozboğa
- Budakören
- Burunköy
- Büğdüz
- Büğet
- Büğrüoğlu
- Büyükdivan
- Büyükgülücek
- Çağşak
- Çakır
- Çalıca
- Çalkışla
- Çaltıcak
- Çalyayla
- Çanakçı
- Çatak
- Çayhatap
- Celilkırı
- Cerit
- Çeşmeören
- Çıkrık
- Çobandivan
- Çomarbaşı
- Çorak
- Çukurören
- Dağkarapınar
- Değirmendere
- Delibekiroğlu
- Deliler
- Denizköy
- Dereköy
- Dutçakallı
- Dutköy
- Düdüklük
- Elicek
- Elköy
- Elmalı
- Erdek
- Ertuğrul
- Esençay
- Eskice
- Eskiekin
- Eskikaradona
- Eskiköy
- Eskiören
- Evcikuzkışla
- Evciortakışla
- Evciyenikışla
- Eyerci
- Eymir
- Feruz
- Gemet
- Göcenovacığı
- Gökçepınar
- Gökdere
- Gökköy
- Güney
- Güveçli
- Güvenli
- Güzelyurt
- Hacıahmetderesi
- Hacıbey
- Hacımusa
- Hacıpaşa
- Hamamlıçay
- Hamdiköy
- Hankozlusu
- Harmancık
- Hımıroğlu
- Hızırdede
- İğdeli
- İnalözü
- İsmailköy
- Kadıderesi
- Kadıkırı
- Kalehisar
- Karaağaç
- Karabayır
- Karabürçek
- Karaca
- Karacaören
- Karadona
- Karagöz
- Karahisar
- Karakeçili
- Karapınar
- Kavacık
- Kayı
- Kazıklıkaya
- Kertme
- Kılıçören
- Kınık
- Kınıkdeliler
- Kiranlık
- Kirazlıpınar
- Kireçocağı
- Kırkdilim
- Kızılpınar
- Konaklı
- Koparan
- Köprüalan
- Kozluca
- Küçükdüvenci
- Küçükgülücek
- Küçükpalabıyık
- Kumçeltiği
- Kuruçay
- Kuşsaray
- Kutluca
- Laloğlu
- Mecidiyekavak
- Mislerovacığı
- Mollahasan
- Morsümbül
- Mühürler
- Mustafaçelebi
- Narlık
- Öksüzler
- Ömerbey
- Örencik
- Osmaniye
- Ovasaray
- Oymaağaç
- Palabıyık
- Pancarlık
- Paşaköy
- Pembecik
- Pınarçay
- Pınarcık
- Şahinkaya
- Salur
- Şanlıosman
- Sapa
- Saraylı
- Sarıkaya
- Sarılık
- Sarımbey
- Sarışeyh
- Sarmaşa
- Sazak
- Sazdeğirmeni
- Şekerbey
- Şendere
- Serban
- Serpin
- Sevindikalanı
- Seydim
- Seydimçakallı
- Seyfe
- Şeyhhamza
- Şeyhmustafa
- Sırıklı
- Soğuksu
- Tarhan
- Tarhankozlusu
- Taşpınar
- Tatar
- Teslim
- Tolamehmet
- Tozluburun
- Turgut
- Türkayşe
- Türkler
- Üçköy
- Uğrak
- Ülkenpınarı
- Üyük
- Yakuparpa
- Yaydiğin
- Yenice
- Yenihayat
- Yeşildere
- Yeşilyayla
- Yoğunpelit
