= Hajibey =

Hajibey may refer to:

- Khadjibey, former fortress and a haven by the Gulf of Odesa, in the location of the modern city of Odesa, Ukraine
- Hadji Bey, Irish Turkish delight confectionery
- Hajibey Sultanov (1921–2008), Azerbaijani astronomer
- Russian destroyer Gadzhibey

== See also ==
- Hacıbey (disambiguation)
- Hajibeyov, partonymic surname from the name
