= Boğacık, Çorum =

Village in Turkey

Boğacık
- Village
- Location in Turkey
- Coordinates: 40°39′N 35°08′E
- Country: Turkey
- Province: Çorum
- District: Çorum
- Population (2022): 140
- Time zone: UTC+3 (TRT)

Boğacık is a village in the Çorum District of Çorum Province in Turkey. Its population is 140 (2022).
