= Tarhankozlusu, Çorum =

Village in Turkey

Tarhankozlusu
- Village
- Location in Turkey
- Coordinates: 40°23′N 34°46′E
- Country: Turkey
- Province: Çorum
- District: Çorum
- Population (2022): 106
- Time zone: UTC+3 (TRT)

Tarhankozlusu (/tɑːr.hɑːn.koʊz.luː.suː/) is a village in the Çorum District of Çorum Province in Turkey. Its population is 106 (2022).
