= Imir =

Imir may refer to:

- Imir, Ardabil (Persian: ايمير)
- Eymir, Zanjan (Persian: ايمير)
- Ymir, a being in Norse mythology
