= Evciyenikışla, Çorum =

Village in Turkey

Evciyenikışla
- Village
- Location in Turkey
- Coordinates: 40°22′N 34°37′E
- Country: Turkey
- Province: Çorum
- District: Çorum
- Population (2022): 40
- Time zone: UTC+3 (TRT)

Evciyenikışla is a village in the Çorum District of Çorum Province in Turkey. Its population is 40 (2022).
