= Şaphane, Oğuzlar =

Village in Turkey

Şaphane
- Village
- Country: Turkey
- Province: Çorum
- District: Oğuzlar
- Population (2022): 231
- Time zone: UTC+3 (TRT)

Şaphane is a village in the Oğuzlar District of Çorum Province in Turkey. Its population is 231 (2022).
