= Balumsultan, Çorum =

Village in Turkey

Balumsultan
- Village
- Location in Turkey
- Coordinates: 40°20′N 34°46′E
- Country: Turkey
- Province: Çorum
- District: Çorum
- Population (2022): 58
- Time zone: UTC+3 (TRT)

Balumsultan is a village in the Çorum District of Çorum Province in Turkey. Its population is 58 (2022).
