= Budakören, Çorum =

Village in Turkey

Budakören
- Village
- Location in Turkey
- Coordinates: 40°21′N 34°50′E
- Country: Turkey
- Province: Çorum
- District: Çorum
- Population (2022): 60
- Time zone: UTC+3 (TRT)

Budakören is a village in the Çorum District of Çorum Province in Turkey. Its population is 60 (2022).
