= Elköy, Çorum =

Village in Turkey

Elköy
- Village
- Location in Turkey
- Coordinates: 40°22′N 35°06′E
- Country: Turkey
- Province: Çorum
- District: Çorum
- Population (2022): 24
- Time zone: UTC+3 (TRT)

Elköy is a village in the Çorum District of Çorum Province in Turkey. Its population is 24 (2022).
