= Sarımbey, Çorum =

Village in Turkey

Sarımbey
- Village
- Location in Turkey
- Coordinates: 40.426781°N 34.806466°E
- Country: Turkey
- Province: Çorum
- District: Çorum
- Population (2022): 171
- Time zone: UTC+3 (TRT)

Sarımbey is a village in the Çorum District of Çorum Province in Turkey. Its population is 171 (2022).

== Geography ==
Sarımbey is located on the southern part of the Çorum Plain. The Ilgınözü Stream flows south of the village. The village, established on a flat area, exhibits the characteristics of the Central Anatolian climate. It is located 19 km from the center of Çorum Province.
