= Kumçeltiği, Çorum =

Village in Turkey

Kumçeltiği
- Village
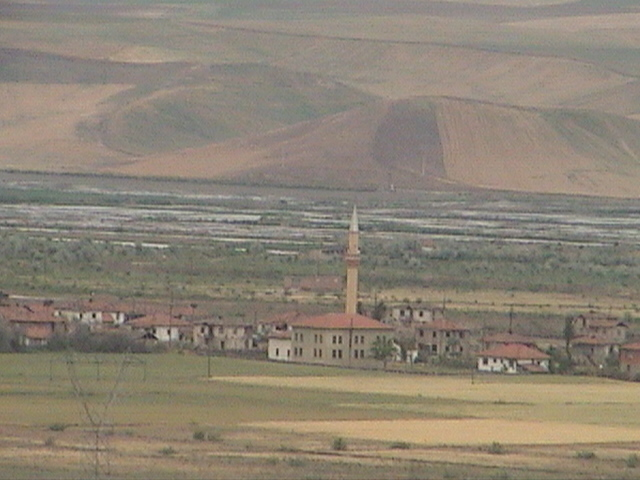

- Location within Turkey
- Coordinates: 40°34′45″N 34°30′35″E
- Country: Turkey
- Province: Çorum
- District: Çorum
- Population (2022): 158
- Time zone: UTC+3 (TRT)

Kumçeltiği is a village in the Çorum District of Çorum Province in Turkey. Its population is 158 (2022).
