= Eskiekin, Çorum =

Village in Turkey

Eskiekin
- Village
- Location in Turkey
- Coordinates: 40°31′N 34°59′E
- Country: Turkey
- Province: Çorum
- District: Çorum
- Population (2022): 100
- Time zone: UTC+3 (TRT)

Eskiekin is a village in the Çorum District of Çorum Province in Turkey. Its population is 100 (2022).
