= Eskikaradona, Çorum =

Village in Turkey

Eskikaradona
- Village
- Location in Turkey
- Coordinates: 40°27′38″N 34°37′55″E
- Country: Turkey
- Province: Çorum
- District: Çorum
- Population (2022): 225
- Time zone: UTC+3 (TRT)

Eskikaradona is a village in the Çorum District of Çorum Province in Turkey. Its population is 225 (2022).
