= Çalyayla, Çorum =

Village in Turkey

Çalyayla
- Village
- Location in Turkey
- Coordinates: 40°42′N 34°47′E
- Country: Turkey
- Province: Çorum
- District: Çorum
- Population (2022): 154
- Time zone: UTC+3 (TRT)

Çalyayla is a village in the Çorum District of Çorum Province in Turkey. Its population is 154 (2022).
