= Yukarıkuyucak, Ortaköy =

Village in Turkey

Yukarıkuyucak
- Village
- Location in Turkey
- Coordinates: 40°12′18″N 35°13′31″E
- Country: Turkey
- Province: Çorum
- District: Ortaköy
- Population (2021): 89
- Time zone: UTC+3 (TRT)

Yukarıkuyucak is a village in the Ortaköy District of Çorum Province in Turkey. Its population is 89 (2021).
