= Yaylacık, Ortaköy =

Village in Turkey

Yaylacık
- Village
- Location in Turkey
- Coordinates: 40°16′35″N 35°05′02″E
- Country: Turkey
- Province: Çorum
- District: Ortaköy
- Population (2021): 84
- Time zone: UTC+3 (TRT)

Yaylacık is a village in the Ortaköy District of Çorum Province in Turkey. Its population is 84 (2021).
