= Hamdiköy, Çorum =

Village in Turkey

Hamdiköy
- Village
- Location in Turkey
- Coordinates: 40°25′N 34°44′E
- Country: Turkey
- Province: Çorum
- District: Çorum
- Population (2022): 108
- Time zone: UTC+3 (TRT)

Hamdiköy is a village in the Çorum District of Çorum Province in Turkey. Its population was 108 in 2022.
