= Şeyhmustafa, Çorum =

Village in Turkey

Şeyhmustafa
- Village
- Location in Turkey
- Coordinates: 40°25′N 35°03′E
- Country: Turkey
- Province: Çorum
- District: Çorum
- Population (2022): 181
- Time zone: UTC+3 (TRT)

Şeyhmustafa is a village in the Çorum District of Çorum Province in Turkey. Its population is 181 (2022).
