= Ayaz, Çorum =

Village in Turkey

Ayaz
- Village
- Location in Turkey
- Coordinates: 40.6780°N 34.8569°E
- Country: Turkey
- Province: Çorum
- District: Çorum
- Population (2022): 159
- Time zone: UTC+3 (TRT)

Ayaz is a village in the Çorum District of Çorum Province in Turkey. Its population is 159 (2022).
