= Ağaççamı, Oğuzlar =

Village in Turkey

Ağaççamı
- Village
- Location in Turkey
- Coordinates: 40°47′55″N 34°40′30″E
- Country: Turkey
- Province: Çorum
- District: Oğuzlar
- Population (2022): 506
- Time zone: UTC+3 (TRT)

Ağaççamı is a village in the Oğuzlar District of Çorum Province in Turkey. Its population is 506 (2022).
