= Ahiilyas, Çorum =

Village in Turkey

Ahiilyas
- Village
- Location in Turkey
- Coordinates: 40°27′N 34°53′E
- Country: Turkey
- Province: Çorum
- District: Çorum
- Population (2022): 194
- Time zone: UTC+3 (TRT)

Ahiilyas is a village in the Çorum District of Çorum Province in Turkey. Its population is 194 (2022).
