= Karaağaç, Çorum =

Village in Turkey

Karaağaç
- Village
- Country: Turkey
- Province: Çorum
- District: Çorum
- Population (2022): 99
- Time zone: UTC+3 (TRT)

Karaağaç is a village in the Çorum District of Çorum Province in Turkey. Its population is 99 (2022).
