= Hımıroğlu, Çorum =

Village in Turkey

Hımıroğlu
- Village
- Location in Turkey
- Coordinates: 40°20′N 35°08′E
- Country: Turkey
- Province: Çorum
- District: Çorum
- Population (2022): 78
- Time zone: UTC+3 (TRT)

Hımıroğlu is a village in the Çorum District of Çorum Province in Turkey. Its population is 78 (2022).
