= Sarmaşa, Çorum =

Village in Turkey

Sarmaşa
- Village
- Location in Turkey
- Coordinates: 40°38′57″N 34°55′19″E
- Country: Turkey
- Province: Çorum
- District: Çorum
- Population (2022): 55
- Time zone: UTC+3 (TRT)

Sarmaşa is a village in the Çorum District of Çorum Province in Turkey. Its population is 55 (2022).
