= Aşağısaraylı, Çorum =

Village in Turkey

Aşağısaraylı
- Village
- Location in Turkey
- Coordinates: 40°33′48″N 34°48′49″E
- Country: Turkey
- Province: Çorum
- District: Çorum
- Population (2022): 116
- Time zone: UTC+3 (TRT)

Aşağısaraylı is a village in the Çorum District of Çorum Province in Turkey. Its population is 116 (2022).
