= Celilkırı, Çorum =

Village in Turkey

Celilkırı
- Village
- Country: Turkey
- Province: Çorum
- District: Çorum
- Population (2022): 239
- Time zone: UTC+3 (TRT)

Celilkırı is a village in the Çorum District of Çorum Province in Turkey. Its population is 239 (2022).
