= Ortaköy, Çorum =

Ortaköy
- Municipality
- Location within Turkey
- Coordinates: 40°16′59″N 35°16′01″E
- Country: Turkey
- Province: Çorum
- District: Ortaköy

Government
  - Mayor: Taner İsbir (AKP)
- Population (2021): 2,033
- Time zone: UTC+3 (TRT)
- Climate: Dsb
- Website: www.corumortakoy.bel.tr

Ortaköy is a town in Çorum Province in the Black Sea region of Turkey, located at 57 km from the city of Çorum. It is the seat of Ortaköy District. Its population is 2,033 (2021). The mayor is Taner İsbir (AKP).

== Archaeological sites ==
The oldest settlement in the area of Ortaköy is found on top of a mound, whereas the later Hittite city of Sapinuwa was laid out on the plain. This city dates to the second millennium BC.

Sapinuwa overlooks a fertile plain and was a key point on the road to Hattusa from the west. The city was an important administrative, political, military and religious center in the Hittite kingdom. The site was later used as a cemetery during the Roman period.

Excavations started in 1990 by Turkish archaeologists from Ankara university. The most important finds discovered so far are an official building with an archive of cuneiform tablets dating to the Hittite empire, and a large store house.
