= Oğuzlar, Çorum =

Oğuzlar
- Municipality
- Location within Turkey
- Coordinates: 40°45′08″N 34°42′17″E
- Country: Turkey
- Province: Çorum
- District: Oğuzlar

Government
  - Mayor: Muzaffer Yıldırım (AKP)
- Population (2022): 2,748
- Time zone: UTC+3 (TRT)
- Area code: 0364
- Climate: Csb
- Website: oguzlar.bel.tr

Oğuzlar is a town in Çorum Province in the Black Sea region of Turkey. It is located at 68 km from the city of Çorum. It is the seat of Dodurga District. Its population is 2,748 (2022). The mayor is Muzaffer Yıldırım (AKP). The town consists of 7 quarters: Asarçay, Gölbaşı, Birtatlı, Çarşı, Çeşme, Karadonlu and Kızılcapelit.

Formerly known as Karabörk Divanı, Karaviran and Karaören, the village was founded in the 13th century by Karadonlu Can Baba, a follower of Sufi mystic Haji Bektash Veli. The name Oğuzlar, after the Oghuz Turks who conquered much of Anatolia, was given in 1990.

Oğuzlar is an agricultural district growing walnuts, hazelnuts and various grains. In recent decades the younger generations have migrated to larger cities in search of jobs and careers.

The town's water supply was put in place in 1973.
