= Çayhatap, Çorum =

Village in Turkey

Çayhatap
- Village
- Location in Turkey
- Coordinates: 40°25′28″N 34°48′50″E
- Country: Turkey
- Province: Çorum
- District: Çorum
- Population (2022): 69
- Time zone: UTC+3 (TRT)

Çayhatap is a village in the Çorum District of Çorum Province in Turkey. Its population is 69 (2022).
