= Boğazönü, Çorum =

Village in Turkey

Boğazönü
- Village
- Location in Turkey
- Coordinates: 40.3212°N 34.8237°E
- Country: Turkey
- Province: Çorum
- District: Çorum
- Population (2022): 42
- Time zone: UTC+3 (TRT)

Boğazönü is a village in the Çorum District of Çorum Province in Turkey. Its population is 42 (2022).
