= Senemoğlu, Ortaköy =

Village in Turkey

Senemoğlu
- Village
- Country: Turkey
- Province: Çorum
- District: Ortaköy
- Population (2021): 159
- Time zone: UTC+3 (TRT)

Senemoğlu is a village in the Ortaköy District of Çorum Province in Turkey. Its population is 159 (2021).
