= Derinöz Dam =

- Interactive map of Derinöz Dam
- Location: Turkey

Derinöz Dam is a dam in Samsun Province, Turkey, built between 1990 and 2002. The development was backed by the Turkish State Hydraulic Works.

== See also ==
- List of dams and reservoirs in Turkey
