= Mühürler, Çorum =

Village in Turkey

Mühürler
- Village
- Location in Turkey
- Coordinates: 40°23′N 34°58′E
- Country: Turkey
- Province: Çorum
- District: Çorum
- Population (2022): 91
- Time zone: UTC+3 (TRT)

Mühürler is a village in the Çorum District of Çorum Province in Turkey. Its population is 91 (2022).
