= Şahinkaya, Çorum =

Village in Turkey

Şahinkaya
- Village
- Country: Turkey
- Province: Çorum
- District: Çorum
- Population (2022): 149
- Time zone: UTC+3 (TRT)

Şahinkaya is a village in the Çorum District of Çorum Province in Turkey. Its population was 149 in 2022.
