= Morsümbül, Çorum =

Village in Turkey

Morsümbül
- Village
- Location in Turkey
- Coordinates: 40°33′N 34°47′E
- Country: Turkey
- Province: Çorum
- District: Çorum
- Population (2022): 115
- Time zone: UTC+3 (TRT)

Morsümbül is a village in the Çorum District of Çorum Province in Turkey. Its population is 115 (2022). The village is populated by Kurds.
