= Arslanköy, Çorum =

Village in Turkey

Arslanköy
- Village
- Location in Turkey
- Coordinates: 40.6329°N 34.6728°E
- Country: Turkey
- Province: Çorum
- District: Çorum
- Population (2022): 105
- Time zone: UTC+3 (TRT)

Arslanköy is a village in the Çorum District of Çorum Province in Turkey. Its population is 105 (2022).
