= Küçükgülücek, Çorum =

Village in Turkey

Küçükgülücek
- Village
- Location in Turkey
- Coordinates: 40°22′N 34°47′E
- Country: Turkey
- Province: Çorum
- District: Çorum
- Population (2022): 49
- Time zone: UTC+3 (TRT)

Küçükgülücek is a village in the Çorum District of Çorum Province in Turkey. Its population is 49 (2022).
