= Mustafaçelebi, Çorum =

Village in Turkey

Mustafaçelebi
- Village
- Location in Turkey
- Coordinates: 40°19′N 34°58′E
- Country: Turkey
- Province: Çorum
- District: Çorum
- Population (2022): 32
- Time zone: UTC+3 (TRT)

Mustafaçelebi is a village in the Çorum District of Çorum Province in Turkey. Its population is 32 (2022). The village is populated by Kurds.
