= Göcenovacığı, Çorum =

Village in Turkey

Göcenovacığı
- Village
- Location in Turkey
- Coordinates: 40°21′N 34°52′E
- Country: Turkey
- Province: Çorum
- District: Çorum
- Population (2022): 151
- Time zone: UTC+3 (TRT)

Göcenovacığı is a village in the Çorum District of Çorum Province in Turkey. Its population is 151 (2022).
