= Büyükdivan, Çorum =

Village in Turkey

Büyükdivan
- Village
- Location in Turkey
- Coordinates: 40.3302°N 34.8772°E
- Country: Turkey
- Province: Çorum
- District: Çorm
- Population (2022): 373
- Time zone: UTC+3 (TRT)

Büyükdivan is a village in the Çorum District of Çorum Province in Turkey. Its population is 373 (2022).
