= Öksüzler, Çorum =

Village in Turkey

Öksüzler
- Village
- Location in Turkey
- Coordinates: 40.63609°N 34.71028°E
- Country: Turkey
- Province: Çorum
- District: Çorum
- Population (2022): 74
- Time zone: UTC+3 (TRT)

Öksüzler is a village in the Çorum District of Çorum Province in Turkey. Its population is 74 (2022).
