= Düdüklük, Çorum =

Village in Turkey

Düdüklük
- Village
- Location in Turkey
- Coordinates: 40°17′41″N 35°01′26″E
- Country: Turkey
- Province: Çorum
- District: Çorum
- Population (2022): 31
- Time zone: UTC+3 (TRT)

Düdüklük is a village in the Çorum District of Çorum Province in Turkey. Its population is 31 (2022). The village is populated by Kurds.
