= Küçükpalabıyık, Çorum =

Village in Turkey

Küçükpalabıyık
- Village
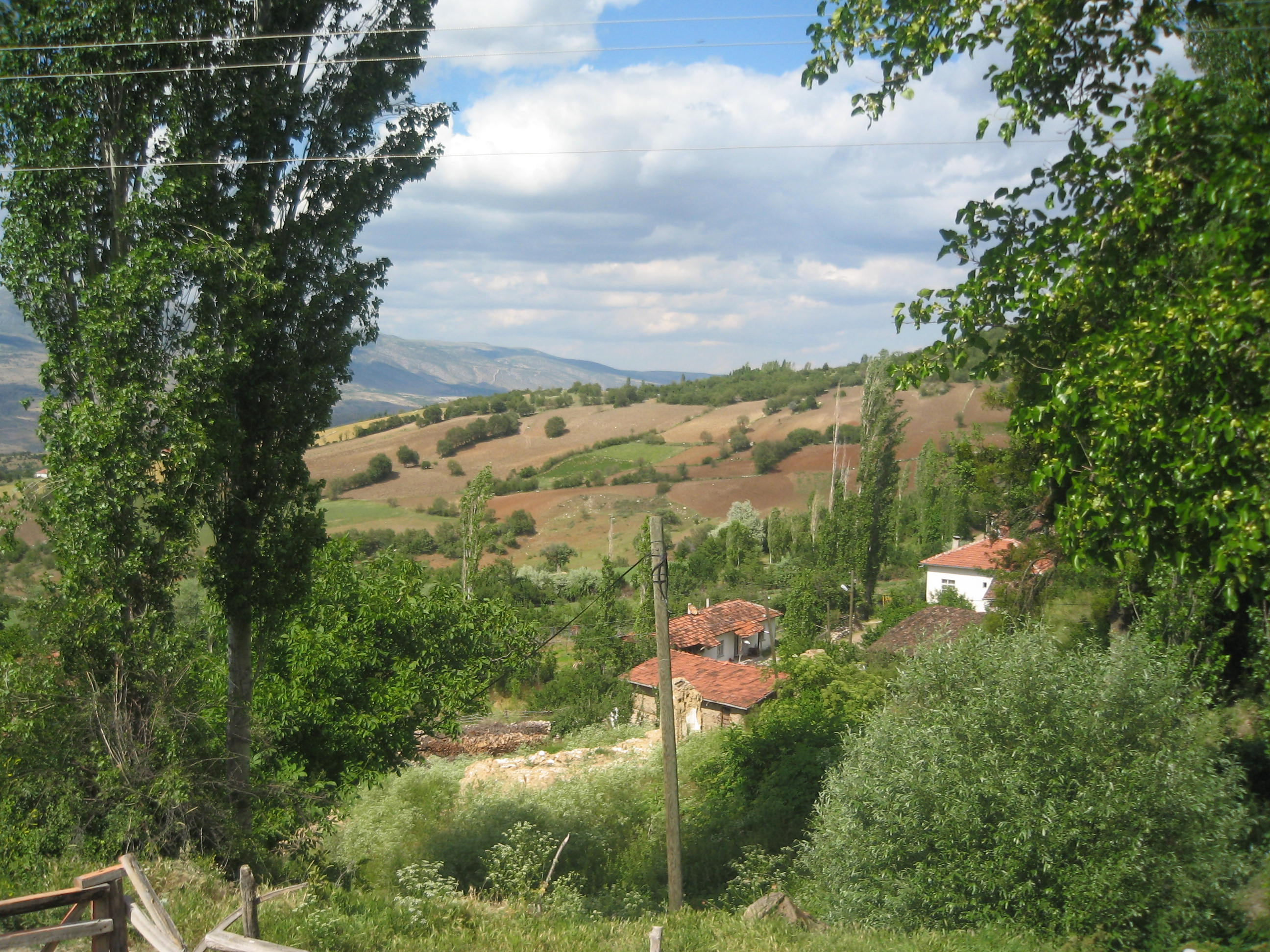

- Location within Turkey
- Coordinates: 40°19′N 35°07′E
- Country: Turkey
- Province: Çorum
- District: Çorum
- Population (2022): 59
- Time zone: UTC+3 (TRT)

Küçükpalabıyık is a village in the Çorum District of Çorum Province in Turkey. Its population is 59 (2022).
