= Ertuğrul, Çorum =

Village in Turkey

Ertuğrul
- Village
- Country: Turkey
- Province: Çorum
- District: Çorum
- Population (2022): 93
- Time zone: UTC+3 (TRT)

Ertuğrul (also: Ertuğrulköy) is a village in the Çorum District of Çorum Province in Turkey. Its population is 93 (2022).
