= Erenler, Oğuzlar =

Village in Turkey

Erenler
- Village
- Location in Turkey
- Coordinates: 40.7891°N 34.6154°E
- Country: Turkey
- Province: Çorum
- District: Oğuzlar
- Population (2022): 154
- Time zone: UTC+3 (TRT)

Erenler is a village in the Oğuzlar District of Çorum Province in Turkey. Its population is 154 (2022).
