= Büyükgülücek, Çorum =

Village in Turkey

Büyükgülücek
- Village
- Location in Turkey
- Coordinates: 40°20′42″N 34°45′06″E
- Country: Turkey
- Province: Çorum
- District: Çorum
- Population (2022): 63
- Time zone: UTC+3 (TRT)

Büyükgülücek is a village in the Çorum District of Çorum Province in Turkey. Its population is 63 (2022).
