= Dağkarapınar, Çorum =

Village in Turkey

Dağkarapınar
- Village
- Country: Turkey
- Province: Çorum
- District: Çorum
- Population (2022): 219
- Time zone: UTC+3 (TRT)

Dağkarapınar is a village in the Çorum District of Çorum Province in Turkey. Its population is 219 (2022).
