= Turgut, Çorum =

Village in Turkey

Turgut
- Village
- Country: Turkey
- Province: Çorum
- District: Çorum
- Population (2022): 118
- Time zone: UTC+3 (TRT)

Turgut (also: Turgutköy) is a village in the Çorum District of Çorum Province in Turkey. Its population is 118 (2022).
