= Hızırdede, Çorum =

Village in Turkey

Hızırdede
- Village
- Location in Turkey
- Coordinates: 40°39′N 35°04′E
- Country: Turkey
- Province: Çorum
- District: Çorum
- Population (2022): 66
- Time zone: UTC+3 (TRT)

Hızırdede is a village in the Çorum District of Çorum Province in Turkey. Its population is 66 (2022).
