= Serban, Çorum =

Village in Turkey

Serban
- Village
- Country: Turkey
- Province: Çorum
- District: Çorum
- Population (2022): 86
- Time zone: UTC+3 (TRT)

Serban is a village in the Çorum District of Çorum Province in Turkey. Its population is 86 (2022).
