= Koparan, Çorum =

Village in Turkey

Koparan
- Village
- Location in Turkey
- Coordinates: 40°18′20″N 34°39′07″E
- Country: Turkey
- Province: Çorum
- District: Çorum
- Population (2022): 64
- Time zone: UTC+3 (TRT)

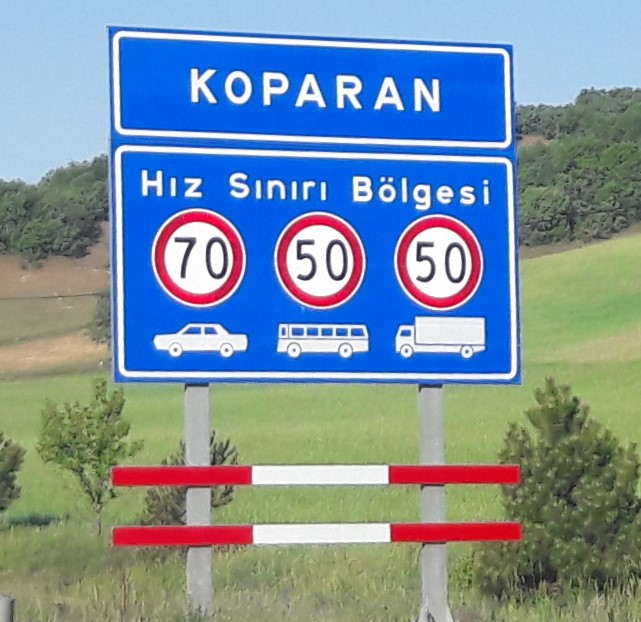
A view from Koparan, Çorum

Koparan (formerly: Yenikaradona) is a village in the Çorum District of Çorum Province in Turkey. Its population is 64 (2022).
