= Yaydiğin, Çorum =

Village in Turkey

Yaydiğin
- Village
- Location in Turkey
- Coordinates: 40°30′43″N 34°55′33″E
- Country: Turkey
- Province: Çorum
- District: Çorum
- Population (2022): 340
- Time zone: UTC+3 (TRT)

Yaydiğin is a village in the Çorum District of Çorum Province in Turkey. Its population is 340 (2022).
