= Elicek, Çorum =

Village in Turkey

Elicek
- Village
- Location in Turkey
- Coordinates: 40°18′55″N 34°46′25″E
- Country: Turkey
- Province: Çorum
- District: Çorum
- Population (2022): 88
- Time zone: UTC+3 (TRT)

Elicek is a village in the Çorum District of Çorum Province in Turkey. Its population is 88 (2022).
