= Akyazı, Çorum =

Village in Turkey

Akyazı
- Village
- Location in Turkey
- Coordinates: 40.5886°N 34.7582°E
- Country: Turkey
- Province: Çorum
- District: Çorum
- Population (2022): 95
- Time zone: UTC+3 (TRT)

Akyazı is a village in the Çorum District of Çorum Province in Turkey. Its population is 95 (2022).
