= Ömerbey, Çorum =

Village in Turkey

Ömerbey
- Village
- Location in Turkey
- Coordinates: 40.57101°N 34.90405°E
- Country: Turkey
- Province: Çorum
- District: Çorum
- Population (2022): 110
- Time zone: UTC+3 (TRT)

Ömerbey is a village in the Çorum District of Çorum Province in Turkey. Its population is 110 (2022).
