= Essence (biological defense program) =

Essence is an abbreviation/acronym for the United States Department of Defense's Electronic Surveillance System for the Early Notification of Community-based Epidemics. Essence's goal is to monitor health data as it becomes available and discover epidemics and similar health concerns before they get out of control. The program was created and developed in 1999 by Michael Lewis, when he was a resident in the Preventive Medicine residency training program at the Walter Reed Army Institute of Research in Silver Spring, Maryland.

Though the program was originally intended for early detection of bioterrorism attacks in the Washington, D.C., area in the wake of the September 11 attacks, the U.S. Army Surgeon General, James Peake, ordered Jay Mansfield, the information technology specialist responsible for the IT development of ESSENCE, to expand ESSENCE to look globally at the entire DoD Military Healthcare System as designed. Subsequently, ESSENCE has been adopted and adapted by the Centers for Disease Control and Prevention, Johns Hopkins University, and numerous health departments around the United States and other countries.
