= Ülkenpınarı, Çorum =

Village in Turkey

Ülkenpınarı
- Village
- Location in Turkey
- Coordinates: 40°33′N 34°36′E
- Country: Turkey
- Province: Çorum
- District: Çorum
- Population (2022): 36
- Time zone: UTC+3 (TRT)

Ülkenpınarı is a village in the Çorum District of Çorum Province in Turkey. Its population is 36 (2022).
