= Kınıkdeliler, Çorum =

Village in Turkey

Kınıkdeliler
- Village
- Country: Turkey
- Province: Çorum
- District: Çorum
- Population (2022): 82
- Time zone: UTC+3 (TRT)

Kınıkdeliler is a village in the Çorum District of Çorum Province in Turkey. Its population is 82 (2022).
