= Karapınar, Çorum =

Village in Turkey

Karapınar
- Village
- Country: Turkey
- Province: Çorum
- District: Çorum
- Population (2022): 250
- Time zone: UTC+3 (TRT)

Karapınar is a village in the Çorum District of Çorum Province in Turkey. Its population is 250 (2022).
