= Konaklı, Çorum =

Village in Turkey

Konaklı
- Village
- Country: Turkey
- Province: Çorum
- District: Çorum
- Population (2022): 613
- Time zone: UTC+3 (TRT)

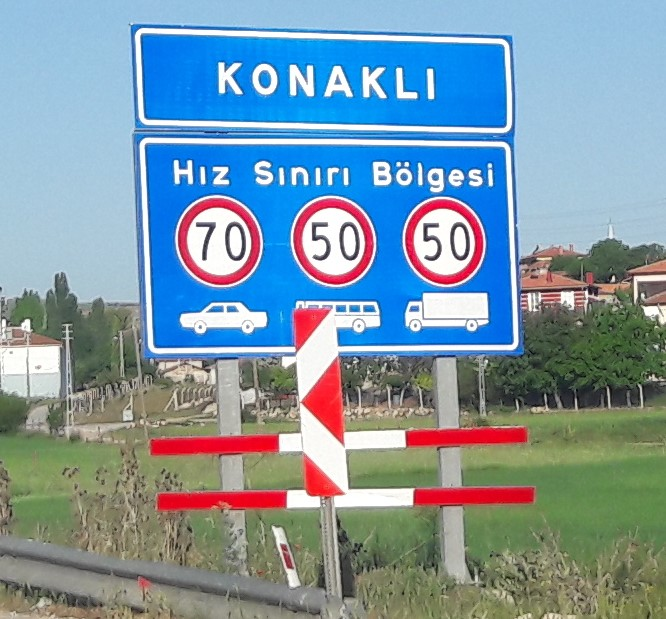

Konaklı is a village in the Çorum District of Çorum Province in Turkey. Its population is 613 (2022). Before the 2013 reorganisation, it was a town (belde).
