= Oruçpınar, Ortaköy =

Village in Turkey

Oruçpınar
- Village
- Location in Turkey
- Coordinates: 40°16′56″N 35°11′28″E
- Country: Turkey
- Province: Çorum
- District: Ortaköy
- Population (2021): 46
- Time zone: UTC+3 (TRT)

Oruçpınar is a village in the Ortaköy District of Çorum Province in Turkey. Its population is 46 (2021).
