= Kalehisar, Çorum =

Village in Turkey

Kalehisar
- Village
- Location in Turkey
- Coordinates: 40°17′29″N 34°41′24″E
- Country: Turkey
- Province: Çorum
- District: Çorum
- Population (2022): 494
- Time zone: UTC+3 (TRT)

Kalehisar is a village in the Çorum District of Çorum Province in Turkey. Its population is 494 (2022).
