= Mislerovacığı, Çorum =

Village in Turkey

Mislerovacığı
- Village
- Location in Turkey
- Coordinates: 40°24′N 34°37′E
- Country: Turkey
- Province: Çorum
- District: Çorum
- Population (2022): 144
- Time zone: UTC+3 (TRT)

Mislerovacığı is a village in the Çorum District of Çorum Province in Turkey. Its population is 144 (2022).
