= Sarılık, Çorum =

Village in Turkey

Sarılık
- Village
- Location within Turkey
- Coordinates: 40°22′46″N 35°2′43″E
- Country: Turkey
- Province: Çorum
- District: Çorum
- Population (2022): 100
- Time zone: UTC+3 (TRT)

Sarılık is a village in the Çorum District of Çorum Province in Turkey. Its population is 100 (2022). The village is populated by Kurds.
