= Seydim, Çorum =

Village in Turkey

Seydim
- Village
- Location in Turkey
- Coordinates: 40°33′N 34°44′E
- Country: Turkey
- Province: Çorum
- District: Çorum
- Population (2022): 547
- Time zone: UTC+3 (TRT)

Seydim is a village in the Çorum District of Çorum Province in Turkey. Its population is 547 (2022). Before the 2013 reorganisation, it was a town (belde).
