= Kızılhamza, Ortaköy =

Village in Turkey

Kızılhamza
- Village
- Location in Turkey
- Coordinates: 40°15′36″N 35°06′12″E
- Country: Turkey
- Province: Çorum
- District: Ortaköy
- Population (2021): 92
- Time zone: UTC+3 (TRT)

Kızılhamza is a village in the Ortaköy District of Çorum Province in Turkey. Its population is 92 (2021).
