= Küçükdüvenci, Çorum =

Village in Turkey

Küçükdüvenci
- Village
- Location in Turkey
- Coordinates: 40°41′N 35°08′E
- Country: Turkey
- Province: Çorum
- District: Çorum
- Population (2022): 133
- Time zone: UTC+3 (TRT)

Küçükdüvenci is a village in the Çorum District of Çorum Province in Turkey. Its population is 133 (2022).
