= Ahmediye, Çorum =

Village in Turkey

Ahmediye
- Village
- Location in Turkey
- Coordinates: 40.6053°N 35.0697°E
- Country: Turkey
- Province: Çorum
- District: Çorum
- Population (2022): 47
- Time zone: UTC+3 (TRT)

Ahmediye is a village in the Çorum District of Çorum Province in Turkey. Its population was 47 in 2022.
