= Çeşmeören, Çorum =

Village in Turkey

Çeşmeören
- Village
- Location in Turkey
- Coordinates: 40°25′45″N 34°53′03″E
- Country: Turkey
- Province: Çorum
- District: Çorum
- Population (2022): 175
- Time zone: UTC+3 (TRT)

Çeşmeören is a village in the Çorum District of Çorum Province in Turkey. Its population is 175 (2022).
