= Yakuparpa, Çorum =

Village in Turkey

Yakuparpa
- Village
- Location in Turkey
- Coordinates: 40°41′N 34°59′E
- Country: Turkey
- Province: Çorum
- District: Çorum
- Population (2022): 123
- Time zone: UTC+3 (TRT)

Yakuparpa is a village in the Çorum District of Çorum Province in Turkey. Its population is 123 (2022).
