= Hamamlıçay, Çorum =

Village in Turkey

Hamamlıçay
- Village
- Location in Turkey
- Coordinates: 40°39′N 34°52′E
- Country: Turkey
- Province: Çorum
- District: Çorum
- Population (2022): 187
- Time zone: UTC+3 (TRT)

Hamamlıçay is a village in the Çorum District of Çorum Province in Turkey. Its population is 187 (2022). The village is 14.5 kilometers away from the city center of Çorum.
