= Bozboğa, Çorum =

Village in Turkey

Bozboğa
- Village
- Location in Turkey
- Coordinates: 40°27′N 34°51′E
- Country: Turkey
- Province: Çorum
- District: Çorum
- Population (2022): 243
- Time zone: UTC+3 (TRT)

Bozboğa is a village in the Çorum District of Çorum Province in Turkey. Its population is 243 (2022).
