= Dutçakallı, Çorum =

Village in Turkey

Dutçakallı
- Village
- Location in Turkey
- Coordinates: 40°36′09″N 34°45′13″E
- Country: Turkey
- Province: Çorum
- District: Çorum
- Population (2022): 101
- Time zone: UTC+3 (TRT)

Dutçakallı is a village in the Çorum District of Çorum Province in Turkey. Its population is 101 (2022).
