= Palabıyık, Çorum =

Village in Turkey

Palabıyık
- Village
- Location in Turkey
- Coordinates: 40°33′47″N 35°05′10″E
- Country: Turkey
- Province: Çorum
- District: Çorum
- Population (2022): 286
- Time zone: UTC+3 (TRT)

Palabıyık is a village in the Çorum District of Çorum Province in Turkey. Its population is 286 (2022).
