= Büğrüoğlu, Çorum =

Village in Turkey

Büğrüoğlu
- Village
- Location in Turkey
- Coordinates: 40.4069°N 34.6577°E
- Country: Turkey
- Province: Çorum
- District: Çorum
- Population (2022): 59
- Time zone: UTC+3 (TRT)

Büğrüoğlu is a village in the Çorum District of Çorum Province in Turkey. Its population is 59 (2022).
