= Tolamehmet, Çorum =

Village in Turkey

Tolamehmet
- Village
- Location in Turkey
- Coordinates: 40°29′27″N 34°59′40″E
- Country: Turkey
- Province: Çorum
- District: Çorum
- Population (2022): 55
- Time zone: UTC+3 (TRT)

Tolamehmet is a village in the Çorum District of Çorum Province in Turkey. Its population is 55 (2022).
