= Kavakalan, Ortaköy =

Village in Turkey

Kavakalan
- Village
- Country: Turkey
- Province: Çorum
- District: Ortaköy
- Population (2021): 94
- Time zone: UTC+3 (TRT)

Kavakalan (also: Kavakalanı) is a village in the Ortaköy District of Çorum Province in Turkey. Its population is 94 (2021).
