= Sazdeğirmeni, Çorum =

Village in Turkey

Sazdeğirmeni
- Village
- Location in Turkey
- Coordinates: 40°24′44″N 34°45′34″E
- Country: Turkey
- Province: Çorum
- District: Çorum
- Population (2022): 61
- Time zone: UTC+3 (TRT)

Sazdeğirmeni is a Circassian village in the Çorum District of Çorum Province in Turkey. As of 2022, its population was 61.
