= Çobandivan, Çorum =

Village in Turkey

Çobandivan
- Village
- Location in Turkey
- Coordinates: 40.40920°N 35.10800°E
- Country: Turkey
- Province: Çorum
- District: Çorum
- Population (2022): 106
- Time zone: UTC+3 (TRT)

Çobandivan (also: Çobandivanı) is a village in the Çorum District of Çorum Province in Turkey. Its population is 106 (2022).
