= Hankozlusu, Çorum =

Village in Turkey

Hankozlusu
- Village
- Location in Turkey
- Coordinates: 40°20′N 34°33′E
- Country: Turkey
- Province: Çorum
- District: Çorum
- Population (2022): 201
- Time zone: UTC+3 (TRT)

Hankozlusu is a village in the Çorum District of Çorum Province in Turkey. Its population is 201 (2022).
