= Çakır, Çorum =

Village in Turkey

Çakır
- Village
- Location within Turkey
- Country: Turkey
- Province: Çorum
- District: Çorum
- Population (2022): 94
- Time zone: UTC+3 (TRT)

Çakır is a village in the Çorum District of Çorum Province in Turkey. Its population is 94 (2022).
