= Boğabağı, Çorum =

Village in Turkey

Boğabağı
- Village
- Location in Turkey
- Coordinates: 40°24′N 34°56′E
- Country: Turkey
- Province: Çorum
- District: Çorum
- Population (2022): 383
- Time zone: UTC+3 (TRT)

Boğabağı is a village in the Çorum District of Çorum Province in Turkey. Its population is 383 (2022).
