= Kazıklıkaya, Çorum =

Village in Çorum, Turkey

Kazıklıkaya
- Village
- Location in Turkey
- Coordinates: 40°30′14″N 35°00′30″E
- Country: Turkey
- Province: Çorum
- District: Çorum
- Elevation: 1,096 m (3,596 ft)
- Population (2022): 112
- Time zone: UTC+3 (TRT)
- Postal code: 19010
- Area code: 0364

Kazıklıkaya is a village in the Çorum District of Çorum Province in Turkey. Its population is 112 (2022).

== History ==
The village has borne the same name since 1925.

== Geography ==
The village is 7 km from the city centre of Çorum.

== Population ==
Village population by year
2022	112
2021	101
2020	99
2019	104
2018	120
2017	88
2016	93
2015	86
2014	87
2013	80
2012	79
2011	81
2010	80
2009	81
2008	86
2007	90
2000	229
1990	283
1985	352
