= Kozluca, Çorum =

Village in Turkey

Kozluca
- Village
- Location in Turkey
- Coordinates: 40.3461°N 35.0144°E
- Country: Turkey
- Province: Çorum
- District: Çorum
- Population (2022): 26
- Time zone: UTC+3 (TRT)

Kozluca is a village in the Çorum District of Çorum Province in Turkey. Its population is 26 (2022). The village is populated by Kurds.
