= İnalözü, Çorum =

Village in Turkey

İnalözü
- Village
- Location in Turkey
- Coordinates: 40°28′N 34°35′E
- Country: Turkey
- Province: Çorum
- District: Çorum
- Population (2022): 229
- Time zone: UTC+3 (TRT)

İnalözü is a village in the Çorum District of Çorum Province in Turkey. Its population is 229 (2022).
