= Beydili, Çorum =

Village in Turkey

Beydili
- Village
- Location in Turkey
- Coordinates: 40°37′32″N 34°53′3″E
- Country: Turkey
- Province: Çorum
- District: Çorum
- Population (2022): 150
- Time zone: UTC+3 (TRT)

Beydili is a village in the Çorum District of Çorum Province in Turkey. Its population is 150 (2022).
