= Aştavul =

Village in Turkey

- Municipality
- Location in Turkey
- Coordinates: 40.2934°N 35.2905°E
- Country: Turkey
- Province: Çorum
- District: Ortaköy
- Population (2021): 2,135
- Time zone: UTC+3 (TRT)

Aştavul (also: Aşdağul) is a town (belde) in the Ortaköy District, Çorum Province, Turkey. Its population is 2,135 (2021).
