= Soğuksu, Çorum =

Village in Turkey

Soğuksu
- Village
- Location in Turkey
- Coordinates: 40.679°N 34.889°E
- Country: Turkey
- Province: Çorum
- District: Çorum
- Population (2022): 97
- Time zone: UTC+3 (TRT)

Soğuksu is a village in the Çorum District of Çorum Province in Turkey. In 2022, it had a population of 97.
