= Karahacip, Ortaköy =

Village in Turkey

Karahacip
- Village
- Location in Turkey
- Coordinates: 40°15′N 35°10′E
- Country: Turkey
- Province: Çorum
- District: Ortaköy
- Population (2021): 892
- Time zone: UTC+3 (TRT)

Karahacip is a village in the Ortaköy District of Çorum Province in Turkey. Its population is 892 (2021). Before the 2013 reorganisation, it was a town (belde).
