= Kadıkırı, Çorum =

Village in Turkey

Kadıkırı
- Village
- Location in Turkey
- Coordinates: 40.452°N 34.875°E
- Country: Turkey
- Province: Çorum
- District: Çorum
- Population (2022): 270
- Time zone: UTC+3 (TRT)

Kadıkırı is a village in the Çorum District of Çorum Province in Turkey. Its population is 270 (2022).
