= Mecidiyekavak, Çorum =

Village in Turkey

Mecidiyekavak
- Village
- Location in Turkey
- Coordinates: 40°29′N 34°41′E
- Country: Turkey
- Province: Çorum
- District: Çorum
- Population (2022): 65
- Time zone: UTC+3 (TRT)

Mecidiyekavak is a village in the Çorum District of Çorum Province in Turkey. Its population is 65 (2022).
