= Kadıderesi, Çorum =

Village in Turkey

Kadıderesi
- Village
- Location in Turkey
- Coordinates: 40°19′N 35°04′E
- Country: Turkey
- Province: Çorum
- District: Çorum
- Population (2022): 51
- Time zone: UTC+3 (TRT)

Kadıderesi is a village in the Çorum District of Çorum Province in Turkey. Its population is 51 (2022). The village is populated by Kurds.
