= Balıyakup, Çorum =

Village in Turkey

Balıyakup
- Village
- Location in Turkey
- Coordinates: 40°21′N 35°05′E
- Country: Turkey
- Province: Çorum
- District: Çorum
- Population (2022): 19
- Time zone: UTC+3 (TRT)

Balıyakup is a village in the Çorum District of Çorum Province in Turkey. Its population is 19 as of 2022.
