= Tatar, Çorum =

Village in Turkey

Tatar
- Village
- Country: Turkey
- Province: Çorum
- District: Çorum
- Population (2022): 155
- Time zone: UTC+3 (TRT)

Tatar is a village in the Çorum District of Çorum Province in Turkey. Its population is 155 (2022).
