= İsmailköy, Çorum =

Village in Turkey

İsmailköy
- Village
- Country: Turkey
- Province: Çorum
- District: Çorum
- Population (2022): 109
- Time zone: UTC+3 (TRT)

İsmailköy is a village in the Çorum District of Çorum Province in Turkey. Its population is 109 (2022).
