= Örencik, Kahramankazan =

Örencik
- Neighbourhood
- Location in Turkey Örencik (Turkey Central Anatolia)
- Coordinates: 40.2594°N 32.6575°E
- Country: Turkey
- Province: Ankara
- District: Kahramankazan
- Population (2022): 183
- Time zone: UTC+3 (TRT)

Örencik is a neighbourhood in the municipality and district of Kahramankazan, Ankara Province, Turkey. Its population is 183 (2022). To differentiate it from the other nearby Örencik village in the District of Kızılcahamam, people in the area call Örencik "Leblebi Örencik" for its production of leblebis, or roasted chickpeas, while calling the other village "Çakmak Örencik."
