= Düvenci, Çorum =

Village in Turkey

Düvenci
- Municipality
- Location in Turkey
- Coordinates: 40°39′38″N 35°9′52″E
- Country: Turkey
- Province: Çorum
- District: Çorum
- Population (2022): 1,623
- Time zone: UTC+3 (TRT)

Düvenci is a town (belde) in the Çorum District, Çorum Province, Turkey. Its population is 1,623 (2022).
