= Asar, Ortaköy =

Village in Turkey

Asar
- Village
- Location in Turkey
- Coordinates: 40.3639°N 35.3470°E
- Country: Turkey
- Province: Çorum
- District: Ortaköy
- Population (2021): 88
- Time zone: UTC+3 (TRT)

Asar is a village in the Ortaköy District of Çorum Province in Turkey. Its population is 88 (2021).
