= Örencik, Kızılcahamam =

Örencik
- Neighbourhood
- Location in Turkey Örencik (Turkey Central Anatolia)
- Coordinates: 40.2506°N 32.4460°E
- Country: Turkey
- Province: Ankara
- District: Kızılcahamam
- Population (2022): 168
- Time zone: UTC+3 (TRT)

Örencik is a neighbourhood in the municipality and district of Kızılcahamam, Ankara Province, Turkey. Its population is 168 (2022). To differentiate it from the other nearby Örencik village in the District of Kahramankazan, people in the area call Örencik "Çakmak Örencik", while calling the other village "Leblebi Örencik."
