= Cevizli, Ortaköy =

Village in Turkey

Cevizli
- Village
- Location in Turkey
- Coordinates: 40.3298°N 35.2370°E
- Country: Turkey
- Province: Çorum
- District: Ortaköy
- Population (2021): 188
- Time zone: UTC+3 (TRT)

Cevizli is a village in the Ortaköy District of Çorum Province in Turkey. Its population is 188 (2021).
