= Oğuzlar District =

District of Çorum Province, Turkey

- District
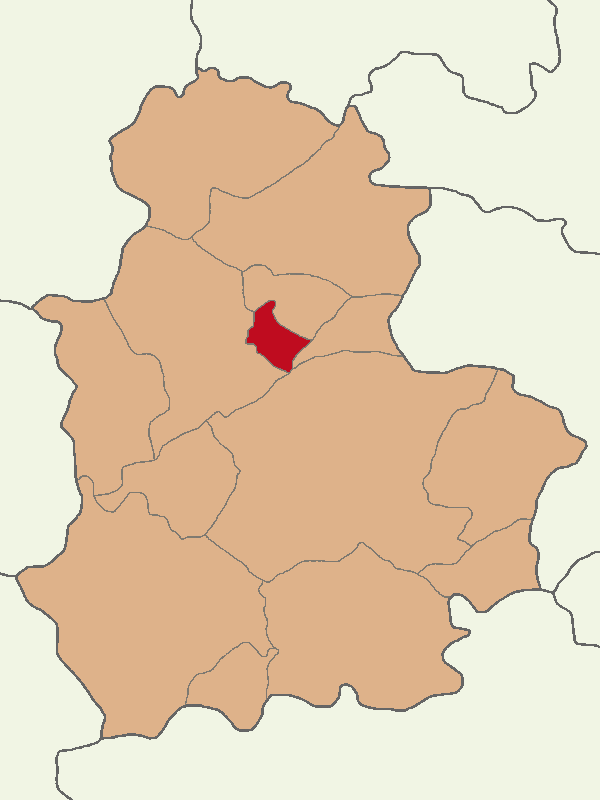
- Map showing Oğuzlar District in Çorum Province

- Location in Turkey
- Coordinates: 40°45′N 34°42′E
- Country: Turkey
- Province: Çorum
- Seat: Oğuzlar

Government
  - Kaymakam: Ali Emre Tekin
- Area: 121 km^{2} (47 sq mi)
- Population (2022): 4,896
  - Density: 40.5/km^{2} (105/sq mi)
- Time zone: UTC+3 (TRT)
- Website: www.oguzlar.gov.tr

Oğuzlar District is a district of the Çorum Province of Turkey. Its seat is the town of Oğuzlar. Its area is 121 km^{2}, and its population is 4,896 (2022).

== Composition ==
There is one municipality in Oğuzlar District:

- Oğuzlar

There are 6 villages in Oğuzlar District:

- Ağaççamı
- Cevizli
- Derinöz
- Erenler
- Kayı
- Şaphane
