= Tozluburun, Çorum =

Village in Turkey

Tozluburun
- Village
- Location in Turkey
- Coordinates: 40°36′N 34°34′E
- Country: Turkey
- Province: Çorum
- District: Çorum
- Population (2022): 112
- Time zone: UTC+3 (TRT)

Tozluburun is a village in the Çorum District of Çorum Province in Turkey. Its population is 112 (2022).
