= Abdalata, Çorum =

Village in Turkey

Abdalata
- Village
- Location in Turkey
- Coordinates: 40°25′N 34°54′E
- Country: Turkey
- Province: Çorum
- District: Çorum
- Population (2022): 483
- Time zone: UTC+3 (TRT)

Abdalata is a village in the Çorum District of Çorum Province in Turkey. Its population is 483 (2022).
