= Karadona, Çorum =

Village in Turkey

Karadona
- Village
- Location in Turkey
- Coordinates: 40°18′11″N 34°38′27″E
- Country: Turkey
- Province: Çorum
- District: Çorum
- Population (2022): 97
- Time zone: UTC+3 (TRT)

Karadona is a village in the Çorum District of Çorum Province in Turkey. Its population is 97 (2022).
