= Hacıpaşa, Çorum =

Village in Turkey

Hacıpaşa
- Village
- Country: Turkey
- Province: Çorum
- District: Çorum
- Population (2022): 106
- Time zone: UTC+3 (TRT)
- Postal code: 19010

Hacıpaşa is a village in the Çorum District of Çorum Province in Turkey. Its population is 106 (2022).
