= Büğdüz, Çorum =

Village in Turkey

Büğdüz
- Village
- Location in Turkey
- Coordinates: 40.3999°N 34.8881°E
- Country: Turkey
- Province: Çorum
- District: Çorum
- Population (2022): 350
- Time zone: UTC+3 (TRT)

Büğdüz is a village in the Çorum District of Çorum Province in Turkey. Its population is 350 (2022).
