= Salbaş, Ortaköy =

Village in Turkey

Salbaş
- Village
- Country: Turkey
- Province: Çorum
- District: Ortaköy
- Population (2021): 113
- Time zone: UTC+3 (TRT)

Salbaş is a village in the Ortaköy District of Çorum Province in Turkey. Its population is 113 (2021).
