= Esençay, Çorum =

Village in Turkey

Esençay
- Village
- Country: Turkey
- Province: Çorum
- District: Çorum
- Population (2022): 243
- Time zone: UTC+3 (TRT)

Esençay is a village in the Çorum District of Çorum Province in Turkey. Its population is 243 (2022). The village is 47.8 kilometers away from the city center of Çorum.
