= Gökçepınar, Çorum =

Village in Turkey

Gökçepınar
- Village
- Country: Turkey
- Province: Çorum
- District: Çorum
- Population (2022): 45
- Time zone: UTC+3 (TRT)

Gökçepınar is a village in the Çorum District of Çorum Province in Turkey. Its population is 45 (2022). The village is populated by Kurds.
