= Sırıklı, Çorum =

Village in Turkey

Sırıklı
- Village
- Country: Turkey
- Province: Çorum
- District: Çorum
- Population (2022): 164
- Time zone: UTC+3 (TRT)

Sırıklı is a village in the Çorum District of Çorum Province in Turkey. Its population is 164 (2022). The village is populated by Kurds.
