= Acıpınar, Çorum =

Village in Turkey

Acıpınar
- Village
- Location in Turkey
- Coordinates: 40.6460°N 34.7515°E
- Country: Turkey
- Province: Çorum
- District: Çorum
- Population (2022): 137
- Time zone: UTC+3 (TRT)

Acıpınar is a village in the Çorum District of Çorum Province in Turkey. Its population is 137 (2022).
