= Altınbaş, Çorum =

Village in Turkey

Altınbaş
- Village
- Location in Turkey
- Coordinates: 40.5669°N 34.8445°E
- Country: Turkey
- Province: Çorum
- District: Çorum
- Population (2022): 201
- Time zone: UTC+3 (TRT)

Altınbaş (Turkish pronunciation: [aɫtʰɯnˈbaʃ]) is a village in the Çorum District, in the Çorum Province, Turkey. Its population is 201 (2022).
