= Şekerbey, Çorum =

Village in Turkey

Şekerbey
- Village
- Location in Turkey
- Coordinates: 40°28′N 35°00′E
- Country: Turkey
- Province: Çorum
- District: Çorum
- Population (2022): 152
- Time zone: UTC+3 (TRT)

Şekerbey is a village in the Çorum District of Çorum Province in Turkey. Its population is 152 (2022).
