= Serpin, Çorum =

Village in Turkey

Serpin
- Village
- Location in Turkey
- Coordinates: 40°38′17″N 34°56′38″E
- Country: Turkey
- Province: Çorum
- District: Çorum
- Population (2022): 127
- Time zone: UTC+3 (TRT)

Serpin is a village in the Çorum District of Çorum Province in Turkey. Its population is 127 (2022).
