= Ayvalı, Çorum =

Village in Turkey

Ayvalı
- Village
- Location in Turkey
- Coordinates: 40.6649°N 35.2258°E
- Country: Turkey
- Province: Çorum
- District: Çorum
- Population (2022): 33
- Time zone: UTC+3 (TRT)

Ayvalı is a village in the Çorum District of Çorum Province in Turkey. Its population is 33 (2022).
