= Hacıbey, Çorum =

Village in Turkey

Coordinates: 40.592°N 34.609°E

Hacıbey
- Village
- Location in Turkey
- Coordinates
- Country: Turkey
- Province: Çorum
- District: Çorum
- Population (2022): 92
- Time zone: UTC+3 (TRT)

Hacıbey is a village in the Çorum District of Çorum Province in Turkey. Its population is 92 (2022).
