= Örencik, Çorum =

Village in Turkey

Örencik
- Village
- Location in Turkey
- Coordinates: 40.37774°N 35.17833°E
- Country: Turkey
- Province: Çorum
- District: Çorum
- Population (2022): 79
- Time zone: UTC+3 (TRT)

Örencik is a village in the Çorum District of Çorum Province in Turkey. Its population is 79 (2022).
