= Belören, Bayat =

Village in Turkey

Belören
- Location in Turkey
- Coordinates: 40.6534°N 34.2256°E
- Country: Turkey
- Province: Çorum
- District: Bayat

Population (2012)
  - Total: 212
- Time zone: UTC+3 (TRT)

Belören is a settlement in the Bayat District of Çorum Province in Turkey.
