= Kuruçay, Bayat =

Village in Turkey

Kuruçay
- Village
- Location in Turkey
- Coordinates: 40°36′31″N 34°7′42″E
- Country: Turkey
- Province: Çorum
- District: Bayat
- Population (2022): 557
- Time zone: UTC+3 (TRT)

Kuruçay is a village in the Bayat District of Çorum Province in Turkey. Its population is 557 (2022).
