= İğdeli, Çorum =

Village in Turkey

İğdeli
- Village
- Country: Turkey
- Province: Çorum
- District: Çorum
- Population (2022): 241
- Time zone: UTC+3 (TRT)

İğdeli is a village in the Çorum District of Çorum Province in Turkey. Its population is 241 (2022).
