= Büğet, Çorum =

Village in Turkey

Büğet
- Village
- Location in Turkey
- Coordinates: 40.6085°N 35.0112°E
- Country: Turkey
- Province: Çorum
- District: Çorum
- Population (2022): 349
- Time zone: UTC+3 (TRT)

Büğet is a village in the Çorum District of Çorum Province in Turkey. Its population is 349 (2022).
