= Karakeçili, Çorum =

Village in Turkey

Karakeçili
- Village
- Country: Turkey
- Province: Çorum
- District: Çorum
- Population (2022): 88
- Time zone: UTC+3 (TRT)

Karakeçili is a village in the Çorum District of Çorum Province in Turkey. Its population is 88 (2022). The village is populated by Oğuz Türkmens.
