= Mollahasan, Çorum =

Village in Turkey

Mollahasan
- Village
- Location in Turkey
- Coordinates: 40°17′7″N 35°3′49″E
- Country: Turkey
- Province: Çorum
- District: Çorum
- Population (2022): 46
- Time zone: UTC+3 (TRT)

Mollahasan is a village in the Çorum District of Çorum Province in Turkey. Its population is 46 (2022). The village is populated by Kurds.
