= Kuruçay, Çorum =

Village in Turkey

Kuruçay
- Village
- Country: Turkey
- Province: Çorum
- District: Çorum
- Population (2022): 299
- Time zone: UTC+3 (TRT)

Kuruçay is a village in the Çorum District of Çorum Province in Turkey. Its population is 299 (2022).
