= Üyük, Çorum =

Village in Turkey

Coordinates: 40.4505°N 34.9539°E

Üyük
- Village
- Location within Turkey
- Country: Turkey
- Province: Çorum
- District: Çorum
- Population (2022): 468
- Time zone: UTC+3 (TRT)

Üyük is a village in the Çorum District of Çorum Province in Turkey. Its population is 468 (2022).
