= Atçalı, Çorum =

Village in Turkey

Atçalı
- Village
- Location in Turkey
- Coordinates: 40°34′05″N 35°03′21″E
- Country: Turkey
- Province: Çorum
- District: Çorum
- Population (2022): 107
- Time zone: UTC+3 (TRT)

Atçalı is a village in the Çorum District of Çorum Province in Turkey. Its population is 107 (2022).
