= Karakeçili, Boğazkale =

Village in Turkey

Karakeçili
- Village
- Country: Turkey
- Province: Çorum
- District: Boğazkale
- Population (2022): 126
- Time zone: UTC+3 (TRT)

Karakeçili is a village in the Boğazkale District of Çorum Province in Turkey. Its population is 126 (2022).
