= Büyükkışla, Ortaköy =

Village in Turkey

Büyükkışla
- Village
- Location in Turkey
- Coordinates: 40.3404°N 35.3396°E
- Country: Turkey
- Province: Çorum
- District: Ortaköy
- Population (2021): 67
- Time zone: UTC+3 (TRT)

Büyükkışla is a village in the Ortaköy District of Çorum Province in Turkey. Its population is 67 (2021).
