= Hacımusa, Çorum =

Village in Turkey

Hacımusa
- Village
- Location in Turkey
- Coordinates: 40.50186°N 35.09504°E
- Country: Turkey
- Province: Çorum
- District: Çorum
- Population (2022): 79
- Time zone: UTC+3 (TRT)

Hacımusa is a village in the Çorum District of Çorum Province in Turkey. Its population is 79 (2022).
