= Çorak, Çorum =

Village in Turkey

Çorak
- Village
- Location in Turkey
- Coordinates: 40.3483°N 35.0516°E
- Country: Turkey
- Province: Çorum
- District: Çorum
- Population (2022): 105
- Time zone: UTC+3 (TRT)

Çorak is a village in the Çorum District of Çorum Province in Turkey. Its population is 105 (2022).
