= Arpalık, Çorum =

Village in Turkey

Arpalık
- Village
- Location in Turkey
- Coordinates: 40.5664°N 34.7026°E
- Country: Turkey
- Province: Çorum
- District: Çorum
- Population (2022): 124
- Time zone: UTC+3 (TRT)

Arpalık is a village in the Çorum District of Çorum Province in Turkey. Its population is 124 (2022).
