= Feruz, Çorum =

Village in Turkey

Feruz
- Village
- Country: Turkey
- Province: Çorum
- District: Çorum
- Population (2022): 123
- Time zone: UTC+3 (TRT)

Feruz is a village in the Çorum District of Çorum Province in Turkey. Its population is 123 (2022).
