= Gökköy, Çorum =

Village in Turkey

Gökköy
- Village
- Country: Turkey
- Province: Çorum
- District: Çorum
- Population (2022): 108
- Time zone: UTC+3 (TRT)

Gökköy is a village in the Çorum District of Çorum Province in Turkey. Its population is 108 (2022).
