= Çıkrık, Çorum =

Village in Turkey

Çıkrık
- Village
- Country: Turkey
- Province: Çorum
- District: Çorum
- Population (2022): 289
- Time zone: UTC+3 (TRT)

Çıkrık is a village in the Çorum District of Çorum Province in Turkey. Its population is 289 (2022).
