= Pembecik, Çorum =

Village in Turkey

Pembecik
- Village
- Country: Turkey
- Province: Çorum
- District: Çorum
- Population (2022): 65
- Time zone: UTC+3 (TRT)

Pembecik is a village in the Çorum District of Çorum Province in Turkey. Its population is 65 (2022).
