= Üçköy, Çorum =

Village in Turkey

Üçköy
- Village
- Country: Turkey
- Province: Çorum
- District: Çorum
- Population (2022): 150
- Time zone: UTC+3 (TRT)

Üçköy is a village in the Çorum District of Çorum Province in Turkey. It is situated in the northern part of the country, near the border with the Black Sea region. The village is known for its scenic beauty and natural surroundings, with many forests and mountains in the area. Agriculture and animal husbandry are the primary economic activities in the village, with crops such as wheat, corn, grapes, walnuts and sunflowers being grown, and livestock including sheep and cattle being raised. The population of Üçköy is relatively small, Its population is estimated to be around 150 (2022).
