= Seydimçakallı, Çorum =

Village in Turkey

Seydimçakallı
- Village
- Location in Turkey
- Coordinates: 40°31′N 34°41′E
- Country: Turkey
- Province: Çorum
- District: Çorum
- Population (2022): 112
- Time zone: UTC+3 (TRT)

Seydimçakallı is a village in the Çorum District of Çorum Province in Turkey. Its population is 112 (2022).
