= Babaoğlu, Çorum =

Village in Turkey

Babaoğlu
- Village
- Location in Turkey
- Coordinates: 40.3571°N 34.7981°E
- Country: Turkey
- Province: Çorum
- District: Çorum
- Population (2022): 189
- Time zone: UTC+3 (TRT)

Babaoğlu is a village in the Çorum District of Çorum Province in Turkey. Its population is 189 (2022).
