= Aksungur, Çorum =

Village in Turkey

Aksungur
- Village
- Location in Turkey
- Coordinates: 40.5153°N 34.8044°E
- Country: Turkey
- Province: Çorum
- District: Çorum
- Population (2022): 204
- Time zone: UTC+3 (TRT)

Aksungur is a village in the Çorum District of Çorum Province in Turkey. Its population is 204 (2022). The village is populated by Kurds.
