= Akçakaya, Çorum =

Village in Turkey

Akçakaya
- Village
- Location in Turkey
- Coordinates: 40.6662°N 34.9261°E
- Country: Turkey
- Province: Çorum
- District: Çorum
- Population (2022): 78
- Time zone: UTC+3 (TRT)

Akçakaya is a village in the Çorum District of Çorum Province in Turkey. Its population is 78 (2022).
