= Çukurören, Çorum =

Village in Turkey

Çukurören
- Village
- Location in Turkey
- Coordinates: 40.636°N 34.828°E
- Country: Turkey
- Province: Çorum
- District: Çorum
- Population (2022): 89
- Time zone: UTC+3 (TRT)

Çukurören is a village in the Çorum District of Çorum Province in Turkey. As of 2022, its population was 89.
