= Akpınar, Gümüşhacıköy =

Akpınar
- Village
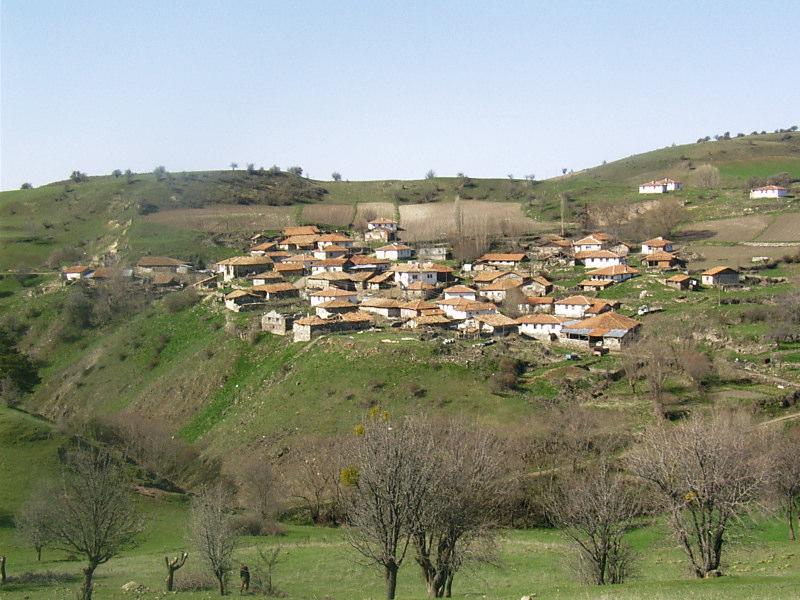

- Location within Turkey
- Coordinates: 40°43′20″N 35°12′7″E
- Country: Turkey
- Province: Amasya
- District: Gümüşhacıköy
- Population (2021): 34
- Time zone: UTC+3 (TRT)

Akpınar is a village in the Gümüşhacıköy District, Amasya Province, Turkey. According to the 2010 census it had a population of 40 people. Its population is 34 (2021). Akpınar is located roughly 135 miles (217 km) northeast of Ankara and 20.2 kilometres south by road from the district capital of Gümüşhacıköy. The village is located in the southern part of the province of Amasya near the border with Çorum Province, just to the northeast of Güllüce and to the southwest of Ovabaşı.

== History ==
Historically there was a mention of the village in 1530 as "AKPINAR KARYESİ".

== Economy ==
The main source of occupation for the villagers is subsistence agriculture and livestock farming, with principal crops being wheat, tobacco, barley and poppy. Many villagers have moved to Istanbul since the 1980s for a higher standard of living.

The village has primary school, but there no drinking water network and sewage in the village. as of 2011. There is a post office, health clinic and health house. The village does have electricity and a fixed telephone line.

== Administration ==
Village head:

2004 - Satılmış Bolat
1999 - Satılmış Yalçin
1994 - Mehmet Aslangündoğdu
1989 - Hulusi Bolat
1984 - Mehmet Uzun
1979 - Ali Temel
