= Scythian culture =

Iron Age archaeological culture in Eastern Europe

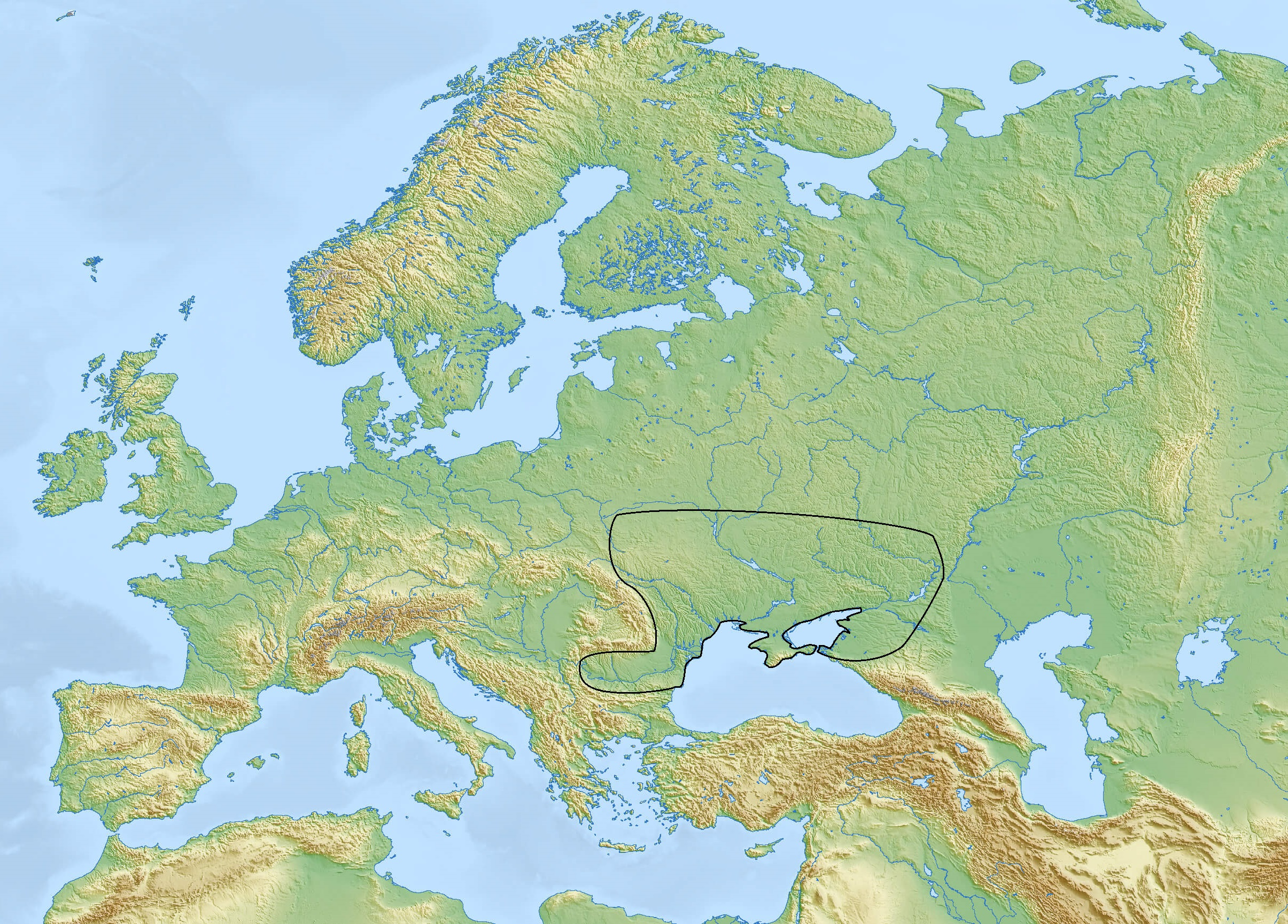
- Horizon: Scytho-Siberian world
- Geographical range: Pontic–Caspian steppe
- Period: Iron Age
- Dates: c. 700 BC – c. 250 AD
- Preceded by: Babadag culture, Basarabi culture, Gáva-Holigrady culture, Kizil-Koba culture, Kobyakovo culture, Novocherkassk culture, Șoldănești culture, Zhabotin culture
- Followed by: Chernyakhov culture, Poienești-Lukaševka culture Sarmatian culture, Zarubintsy culture

The Scythian culture was an Iron Age archaeological culture which flourished on the Pontic-Caspian steppe in Eastern Europe from about 700 BC to 200 AD. It is associated with the Scythians, Cimmerians, and other peoples inhabiting the region of Scythia, and was part of the wider Scytho-Siberian world.

== Chronology ==
The Scythian Culture can be divided into three stages:

- Early Scythian – from the mid-8th or the late 7th century BC to about 500 BC
- Mid-Scythian or Classical Scythian – from about 500 BC to about 200 BC
- Late Scythian – from about 200 BC to the mid-3rd century AD, in Crimea and the Lower Dnipro, by which time the population was settled.

== Development ==
=== Early Scythian ===
The Early Scythian Culture emerged during the 8th century BC. Since the Scythians were nomads who did not create permanent settlements, the Early Scythian culture is known primarily from Scythian funerary sites.

The Scythians originated in the region of the Volga-Ural steppes of Central Asia, possibly around the 9th century BC, as a section of the population of the Srubnaya culture, to which the Scythians themselves initially belonged. The population of the Srubnaya culture was among the first truly nomadic pastoralist groups, who themselves emerged in the Central Asian and Siberian steppes during the 9th century BC as a result of the cold and dry climate then prevailing in these regions.

Archaeologically, the Scythians proper as well as a related people from the Caspian and Caucasian steppes, the Cimmerians, both belonged to pre-Scythian cultures, with the earliest Scythians belonging to the Srubnaya culture in its Srubnaya-Khvalynsk form. The Srubnaya culture expanded into the territory to the west of the Volga in two to three waves, with the westwards migration of the Early Scythians from Central Asia into the Caspian Steppe constituting the latest of these waves, which occurred in the 9th century BC.

The Scythian movement into Transcaucasia is attested in the form of a migration of a section of the Srubnaya-Khvalynsk culture to the west into the Pontic steppe, to the south towards the northern foothills of the Caucasus mountains, and to the south along the western coast of the Caspian Sea into Transcaucasia and the Iranian plateau. Although the Early Scythians initially belonged to a pre-Scythian archaeological culture, their original Srubnaya culture which contained significant admixture from the Andronovo culture evolved into the Scythian culture from coming in contact with the peoples of Transcaucasia and the Urartians, and further contacts with the civilisation of West Asia, and especially with that of Mesopotamia, would also have an important influence on the formation of Scythian culture; the Early Scythian culture thus possessed several Central Asian elements, but developed into its definitive form under the influence of the cultures of Ciscausia, with some minor influences from ancient West Asian cultures as well. The Scythians who had expanded into the Pontic steppe meanwhile maintained their Srubnaya culture in its Srubnaya-Khvalynsk form, which is also called the Late Srubnaya culture, which spread over the territory of the Catacomb culture in the Pontic Steppe.

The Cimmerians are associated with the Chernogorovka-Novocherkassk Culture of the west Eurasian steppe, which itself showed strong influences originating from the east in Central Asia and Siberia (more specifically from the Karasuk, Arzhan, and Altai cultures), as well as from the Kuban culture of the Caucasus which contributed to its development. Materially, the Chernogorovka-Novocherkassk culture is difficult to distinguish from the Late Srubnaya culture of the early Scythians who later became dominant in the Pontic steppe and replaced the Cimmerians in the Caucasian steppe, with both the Cimmerians and the Scythians being part of the larger Chernagorovsk-Arzhan cultural complex, and both Scythians and the Cimmerians used Novocherkassk objects when the Scythians initially arrived into the Caucasian and Pontic steppes.

The grave goods within the tombs in Ciscaucasia during the 8th to 7th centuries BC, such as those of Khutor Kubanskiy and Krasnoarmeyskoye, show differences resulting from the invasion of the Scythians into the region.

The initial westward migration of the Scythians from Central Asia was accompanied by the introduction into the north Pontic region of articles originating in the Siberian Karasuk culture and which were characteristic of Late Srubnaya archaeological culture, consisting of cast bronze cauldrons, daggers, swords, and horse harnesses. The Late Srubnaya culture thus consisted of North Caucasian populations, who manufactured standard bronze horse harness bits adapted from West Asian types in Koban metallurgical workshops, and of the Late Srubnaya Scythians, who introduced Siberian bronze horse harness bits with stirrup-shaped terminals; the spread of the latter to the west corresponded to the migration of the Scythians in that direction. Horse harness bits of both the North Caucasian and Siberian types as well as Novocherkassk type swords, daggers and articles were in turn introduced into Central Europe by Ciscaucasian populations who migrated there under the pressure of the incoming Scythians.

The initial Scythian movements of the 8th to 7th century BC into the eastern Pontic steppe had also destroyed most of the Sabatynivka culture around c. 800 BC, although many of their settlements were rebuilt and lasted until the 6th century BC. Sections of the Sabatynivka culture nevertheless subsisted in the western part of the steppe, in the country of the Alazones, until around 450 to 400 BC, as well as in the region inhabited by the Georgoi, some of whose settlements corresponded to the later phases of the Sabatynivka culture.

==== Material remains ====
Early Scythian material remains were composed of a specific set of articles which exhibited minor regional differences:

- horse bridles which were composed of:
  - metal bits, made of:
    - bronze, with ends shaped like stirrups,
    - iron, whose ends were looped.
  - cheek-pieces which were joined to the metal bits with straps; these cheek-pieces were usually made of:
    - iron, and had three loops, and a curved or straight end,
    - bone, and had three holes, and their ends were decorated in the animal style,
    - bronze, and had three hopes,
    - wood, with bone ends.
  - separators where the straps crossed each other, to prevent them from becoming tangled.
  - nose plates.
- weapons, consisting of:
  - small sigmoid composite bows,
  - arrows, whose arrowheads were usually made of bronze, and sometimes of bronze or iron; the arrowheads had a socket and two or three edges,
  - 1.70 to 2.20 metre long spears with bay leaf-shaped spearheads,
  - 50 to 70 centimetres-long iron swords and daggers called akīnakai (singular: akīnakēs),
  - longer swords, which ceased being used after the Early Scythian period,
  - war axes,
  - scale armour consisting of iron, bronze, or bone scales sewn onto leather,
  - "Kuban"-type helmets.
- bronze or iron cultic terminals made of hollow bells with slits and small balls inside them, which were positioned on high sockets and crowned with images of animal or bird heads or figures, which were often found with remains of carts and chariots or alongside horse skeletons,
- large bronze mirrors with handle shaped like a loop or like a plaque raised over two small posts,
- large round cast-bronze cauldrons on high feet with vertical handles at their edges that were sometimes shaped like animal figures.

Some of the Early Scythian material remains also exhibits connections with those of the pre-Scythian cultures of the north Pontic region.

==== The Cimmerian and Scythian presence in West Asia ====
By the time the Cimmerians had moved into West Asia, they had come into contact with the native cultures of Transcaucasia, of the Iranian Plateau, and the Armenian Highlands, under the influence of which their material culture became indistinguishable from the archaeological Scythian culture, which itself had developed from the contact of the Early Scythians who initially belonged to the Srubnaya culture with the native cultures of Transcaucasia and Mesopotamia.

Therefore, the Cimmerians in West Asia are considered to have materially belonged to the Early Scythian culture, and archaeological remains of the Scythians and Cimmerians are difficult to distinguish from each other, with "Scythian" arrowheads have been found among the weapons of besieging armies of ruined cities in parts of Anatolia where Cimmerians are attested have operated but where Scythians were not active. The adoption of Scythian techniques by the Medes also makes it difficult to archaeologically distinguish the Scythians from the Medes. Attesting to these movements are archaeological records of Scythian presence to the south of the Caucasus range in the 7th century BC, which predate the earliest Scythian material remains to the north of the Caucasus Mountains, which are from the 6th century BC; the earliest Scythian antiquities from the north of the Caucasus Mountains also show significant West Asian influence. Examples of Early Scythian burials in the Near East include those of Norşuntepe and İmirler. Objects of Early Scythian type have been found in Urartian fortresses such as Teishebaini, Bastam and Ayanis-kale. Near Eastern influences are probably explained through objects made by Near Eastern craftsmen on behalf of Scythian chieftains.

During the 8th to 7th century BC, which corresponded to the period when the Scythian kingdom was centred in the Ciscaucasian Steppe and extended into West Asia and the Pontic Steppe, the older Novocherkassk Culture was replaced by a new Scythian Culture. The transition from the Chernogorovka-Novocherkassk culture to the Scythian culture appears to have itself been a continuous process, and the Cimmerians cannot be distinguished from the Scythians during the period of transition from the Chernogorovka-Novocherkassk culture to the Scythian culture.

Although the pre-Scythian Transcaucasian tombs showed no significant social stratification among the local population, by the 8th century BC, sumptuously furnished tombs of Scythian aristocrats containing human sacrifices appeared in the area. These were different from the tombs of the native population, and show significant social differences; the human remains within the tombs also reflected these social differences, with members of the native population being sacrificed on the graves of their Scythian overlords. Other Early Scythian remains in Transcaucasia include the kurgans of Sé Girdan, where a 7th-century BC tomb contained a crouched skeleton body of a Scythian aristocrat covered with ochre similar to the Andronovo burials of Central Asia, and near whom was a feline-headed whetstone similar to sculptures from the Minusinsk Hollow in southern Siberia, showing that he was a Srubnaya-Khvalynsk Scythian of Andronovo descent. Another of the Sé Girdan kurgans contained three coeval bronze axes from the Late Bronze Age, thus attesting to connections between the Transcaucasian and Ciscaucasian Scythian groups.

The lavish equipment which included West Asian-manufactured grave goods and animal and human sacrifices of the later Scythian kurgans (barrow-graves) in Ciscaucasia reflected practices borrowed from the peoples of West Asia by the Scythians during the 7th century BC. These were present in neither the pre-Scythian kurgans of the Pontic Steppe nor in those of the Srubnaya and Andronovo cultures ancestral to the Scythians and Sarmatians, and they also were not found among the Saka tribes to the east of the Ural Mountains.

Among the remains of the Scythian presence in West Asia is the Ziwiye hoard, within which was buried a Scythian king in a sarcophagus along with his queen, some female servants, several armed guards, and eleven horses, all immolated, as well as a chariot. The grave goods of the king included a ceremonial golden sword and its scabbard, which had been decorated with gold and silver and ivory, as well as a breastplate, pectorals, a silver shield, three iron daggers, seven iron lance-heads, bronze disc-shaped shield bosses belonging to the guards, bows and arrows, gold and bronze vases, pottery, horse gear, a decorated silver chamfron, sculpted ivory, and jewelry belonging to the queen. The objects of the Ziwiye hoard had been made over the 7th century BC, and were placed in the burial at the end of that century or possibly around 600 BC. The hoard also contained a bronze sarcophagus on which was represented the deceased, dressed as an Assyrian high official, towards whom Median, Urartian and Mannaean tribute-bearers were being led. According to Tadeusz Sulimirski, this burial belonged to the Scythian king Bartatua, and was the first West Asian-influenced Scythian burial whose model would be emulated by subsequent Scythian rulers. The custom of performing human sacrifices during funerals had itself been adopted from the Mesopotamian and Transcaucasian peoples. However, many of the objects claimed to be from Ziwiye by museums have turned out to be forgeries or from other origins.

One Scythian burial in the steppe region dating from the Scythian period in West Asia is a 7th-century BC kurgan from Krivorozhye, which contained a bull head-shaped silver terminal which had once been part of an Assyrian stool, a wreath made of electrum which adorned a bronze helmet, and an animal-shaped Ionian Greek vase from Samos. The Scythian kurgan from Temir-gora similarly dated from the 7th century BC. The painted Greek pottery found in the Krivorozhye and Temir-gora kurgans were the earliest examples of Greek imported Greek goods in Scythian burials.

Attesting to the movements of the Scythians into West Asia and from there into Ciscaucasia are archaeological records of Scythian presence to the south of the Caucasus range in the 7th century BC, which predate the earliest Scythian material remains to the north of the Caucasus Mountains, which are from the 6th century BC. With the arrival of the Scythians from West Asia into the Kuban Steppe around 600 BC in the country of the native sedentary Caucasian Maeotians, the Scythians formed a ruling class over the Maeotians, who lived in earthworks and settlements and practised agriculture and fishing, and who buried their dead in flat cemeteries, unlike the Scythians, who buried their dead in kurgans; this resulted in the older Novocherkassk type material culture was replaced by a new Scythian culture consisting of kurgans in the steppe and of settlements and earthworks in the Kuban River valley.. During the 6th century BC, the Scythians built several earthworks along the right bank of the Kuban River which were inhabited by both Scythians and Maeotians. This native Ciscaucasian population, who were primarily agriculturists, belonged to the Late Koban Culture. More than one hundred settlements, cemeteries and kurgan groups belonging to this culture have been found, and pottery belonging to "early Scythian ware" and Scythian elements have been found in many of these, showing that the Scythians lived alongside the local native population in these settlements.

==== Different burial modes ====
Inhumation was the main mode of final disposition in Scythia, and Scythian kurgans started spreading in the Pontic steppe in the 6th century BC, corresponding with the northwards migration of the Royal Scythians from West Asia to the Pontic steppe. The burials and funeral rites across Scythia varied on a regional and class basis, and also evolved with time, especially due to the immigration of new nomadic groups into Scythia:

- the Scythian ruling classes were buried in large underground burial chambers or in timber sepulchres whose grave goods included Greek pottery, weapons, and personal ornaments decorated in the animal style, and these kurgans were decorated on their surface with stelae consisting of large slabs of rocks whose surfaces had been carved into crude human figures in relief and which represented armed men whose dress, swords and weapons had been sculpted in detail. The burials of the Early Scythian period consisted of rectangular shafts with mounds of earth over them. These graves, especially those belonging to the aristocracy, consisted of special wooden structures which had been sunken into a large shaft or had been built into the ground. This tradition had already existed in the region of the Pontic Steppe since the 3rd millennium BC, and had later been adopted by the Scythians.
  - Scythian bronze cauldrons, containing within them remains of horse and mutton bones, which were remnants of food for the deceased in the afterlife, were placed in burials along with deceased individuals.
- among the Aroteres, where a Scythian ruling class ruled over a population of Thracian origin, the sedentary Thracians were buried in poorly furnished shaft tombs or were cremated, with the Aroteres being the only group in Scythia among whom cremation is attested.
- the Scythian Agriculturalists were instead buried in flat graves with no outside marks.
- the tombs of the Callipidae similarly consisted of small and flat burials in small cemeteries, while their Scythian ruling class were buried in Scythian-type kurgans similar to those of the Tiasmyn group, suggesting that the populations of these two areas might have had close connections.
- in western Ciscaucasia, where a Scythian elite ruled over the native Maeotian population, the Maeotians buried their dead in "flat" cemeteries, while the Scythian ruling class buried its dead in kurgans.

==== The Royal Scythians ====
===== Ciscaucasian burials =====
The earliest Scythian antiquities from the north of the Caucasus Mountains date from the 6th century BC, and the inhumation of the dead among the Scythians was done in kurgans consisting of rectangular or square pits dug into the ground and covered with wood or of stone or wooden vaults built on the surface, over which were raised mounds of earth whose sizes depended on the status of the deceased; the dead themselves were placed into these burials resting on their backs; and during the Early Scythian period, the tribe of the Royal Scythians would primarily bury their dead at the edges of the territories they occupied, especially in the western Cisaucasian region, instead of within the steppe region that was the centre of their kingdom; due to this, several Scythian kurgans nekropoleis were located in Ciscaucasia, with some of them being significantly wealthy and belonging to aristocrats or royalty, and the Royal Scythians' burials in the Kuban Steppe were the most lavish of all Scythian funerary monuments during the Early Scythian period.

These earliest Scythian remains to the north of the Caucasus would continue to show significant West Asian influence due to the preceding period of Scythian presence in West Asia, and Scythian material remains from royal burials in Ciscaucasia from the rest of the 6th century BC would continue showing significant West Asian influences, including human sacrifices and burnt horse hecatombs, which were absent from the contemporary Scythian royal burials within the Pontic Steppe itself; the Royal Scythian kurgans in the Ciscaucasia often contained the skeletons of between 16 and 24 immolated horses, which were usually riding-horses, along with their harnesses, with the number of horses depending on the status of the deceased, although some draught-horses alongside chariots were also present in some of these burials. These funerary practices had been adopted by the Scythians from the native West Asian peoples, and were based on the notion of the divine origin of royal power, which was itself borrowed by the Scythians from the populations of Transcaucasia and Mesopotamia, and the Scythians in turn introduced these customs into the Steppe. Within the earlier Scythian kurgans of the Kuban Steppe were also buried articles which had been produced by Assyrian and Urartian workshops during the Scythians' presence in West Asia, but once the Scythians had retreated from West Asia and into the Kuban steppe, they came into contact with Greek colonists, and therefore instead had to obtain their grave goods from Greek and Bosporan artisans, who combined West Asian motifs with local ones according to the tastes of their Scythian patrons, and the Ciscaucasian kurgans' West Asian grave goods would thus later be replaced by objects made locally for the Scythian market by Greek artisans, and mirrors made in the Greek colony of Pontic Olbia were commonly placed in the burials of Scythian women during the earlier phases of the Pontic Scythian kingdom. The most important Scythian kurgans of Ciscaucasia were located at Kelermes. Novozavedennoye, Krasnoye Znamya, Nartan, Ulski, and Kostromskaya:

- The Kelermes kurgans belonged to the Scythian ruling class whom the Medes had expelled from West Asia around 600 BC.
  - The layout and contents of the Kelermes kurgans corresponded to the description of a Scythian royal funeral as described by Herodotus of Halicarnassus, according to whom 50 Scythian youths were sacrificed and their bodies were impaled and mounted atop the bodies of sacrificed horses around the top of the burial mound one year after the funeral.
  - The Kelermes kurgans, as well as the Krasnoznamenskiy kurgans, which both dated from the period of Scythian presence in West Asia, contained objects made by West Asian artisans and which had been brought back into Cuscaucasia by the Scythians:
    - Kurgan 1 of Kelermes, dated from some time between 675 and 550 BC, was the burial of an aristocrat and was the most valuably and finely furnished one of the group, with all of its grave goods originating from West Asia, more specifically of Assyrian, Urartian and Median provenance, having been brought by the Scythian king buried within it during a retreat from West Asia. Among these were a sword and a pole-axe, which mixed both Scythian and West Asian features and had been manufactured by West Asian artisans for Scythian patrons.
    - Kurgan 2 of Kelermes included a man's burial which contained objects decorated with Scythian style deer figures, and a woman's grave contained an Ionian Greek gilt mirror made in the 7th or 6th century BC.
    - Kurgan 4 of Kelermes contained a rectangular gold plaque divided into squares all decorated with the figure of a recumbent stag, which had been modelled on a prototype from Urartu and from the Ziwiyeh hoard, as well as a Greek silver mirror decorated with gold leaf dating from between 580 and 570 BC.
- The royal burials from Kelermesskaya and Kostromskaya contained shields which were decorated with a central stag-shaped plaque. The early Scythian royal burials in western Ciscaucasia, from the 6th and early 5th century, also contained bronze helmets made by the native populations of the Caucasus; from the 5th century BC, Greek Attic-type helmets started appearing in the burials of this region; and 4th century BC tombs in the area contained bronze greaves imported from Greece and Caucasian-made helmets.
- The most sumptuous Scythian kurgan in Ciscaucasia was the Ulski kurgan, which did not contain any burial and instead functioned as a sanctuary. The Ulski kurgan was 15 metres high, contained the skeletons of more than 400 horses, 10 oxen, and several attendants, and followed the West Asian-influenced model of Scythian kurgans first established with the Ziwiyeh tomb.

===== Forest-steppe burials =====
In the second half of the 6th century BC, during the Early Scythian period itself, the Royal Scythians started burying their dead in the northwestern edge of their territory, in the forest-steppe along the Dnipro River, which was located on the boundary of the steppe and the forest-steppe, and corresponded to the country of Gerrhos and to the eastern part of the territory of the Aroteres tribe. Dating from the Early Scythian period are grave goods imported from Ciscaucasia and Transcaucasia which found in the earlier burials of the Tiasmyn group, and Scythian burials in the territory of the Tiasmyn and Kyiv groups which included large numbers of equipment, jewelry, and weapons originating from West Asia, as well as articles originating from West Transcaucasia, more precisely from Georgia, all manufactured during the late 7th century BC and brought by the West Asian and Transcaucasian Scythians during their retreat from Asia.

The Royal Scythian burials in the forest-steppe were similar to those in Ciscaucasia, and consisted of pits covered with wood, or of wooden vaults either built over the surface of the earth or placed into the pits, with the vaults sometimes having been set on fire before the mounds of earth were raised over them, being thus similar but not identical to the Ciscaucasian burials. The Royal Scythian burials in the forest-steppe included:

- the Melgunov Kurgan, from sometime between 575 and 550 BC, which was the oldest known Scythian burial within Scythia itself in the Pontic steppe, and belonged to those Royal Scythians who had left West Asia for the northern Pontic region. A Scythian ruler who had arrived from West Asia was buried in the Melgunov kurgan, and it contained grave goods of primarily Urartian and Median origin which had been manufactured before the Scythian retreat from West Asia, while it contained barely any objects of Greek origin and Greek decorative elements on some objects.
- Other Scythian burials in the forest steppe included the Perepiatykha, Zhabotyn, Darivka, Kherson Raion, Starsha, Vovkivtsi, Popivka, Crimea, and Stebliv sites. Later Early Scythian burials in the forest-steppee were located at Huliai Horod, Bobrytsia, Synyavka, Medvyn, Repiakhuvata, Solodka, Shumeiko, and Popivka, Crimea.

Scythian art from the 6th century BC continued showing West Asian influences even after the Scythian retreat into the steppe, including, in addition to those found in western Ciscaucasian burials, examples from the Melhuniv kurhan in what is presently Ukraine and in the Witaszkowo Treasure, found in what is modern-day Poland, and the swords with gold sheaths found in the Melhuniv and Kelermes kurgans had likely been made in the same West Asian workshops.

The most northern Scythian kurgan from the middle Dnipro group of the Scythian culture was located at Mala Ofirna, where was buried a warrior, who might possibly have been a local lord who was buried there along with his wife, and two of his servants outside of the main burial chamber, and which contained weapons, horse gear, bronze personal ornaments, and many clay vessels. The grave's wooden construction was burnt after the funeral, and a mound was raised over the ashes. The horse cheekpieces from the Mala Ofirna kurgan were of the same type as those from western Ciscaucasia, and similar ones were found in the Urartian fortress of Teishebani which had been destroyed by the Scythians, suggesting that the warrior buried within it was one of the Royal Scythians who had arrived into the Pontic steppe from West Asia.

===== Steppe burials =====
Scythian kurgans started spreading in the Pontic steppe in the 6th century BC, corresponding with the northwards migration of the Royal Scythians from West Asia to the Pontic steppe. However, since the Royal Scythians primarily buried their dead in western Ciscaucasia, only few burials belonging to them from the 6th and 5th centuries BC have been found in the Pontic steppe itself: none of the aristocratic Scythian burials of the 6th and 5th centuries BC were found in their territory; while five aristocratic burials were from the later 5th century BC; the sumptuously furnished kurgan of Solokha dated from the late 5th to early 4th century BC; and the rest were from the 4th to 3rd century BC. The common population of the Scythians during this period still maintained the Late Srubnaya culture, and they started adopting the Scythian culture and animal style art only by the late 5th century BC; during the 6th and 5th centuries BC, in the Early Scythian period itself, common members of the Royal Scythian tribe were buried around the northern limits of the steppe, in the region around present-day Kramatorsk: the early Scythian-type graves within the Royal Scythians' territory in the Pontic steppe were instead largely secondary burials where the deceased had been buried in older Srubnaya-type kurgans, and the Scythian graves of this period included wooden structures which were similar to those found in Srubnaya graves while Scythian funerary pottery was also similar to Srubnaya pottery; typically "Scythian" three-edged bronze arrowheads were found in several graves with Srubnaya grave goods from the region of Izium and Kramatorsk, showing that there was a continuity of settlement in the Royal Scythians' territory during the transition from the Srubnaya to the Scythian culture.

During the later periods of the Early Scythian phase, more burials of members of the Royal Scythian tribe first start appearing further to the west of Ciscaucasia, in the part of the Pontic Steppe to the south of the Dnipro River's bend.

==== The Aroteres ====
The Aroteres corresponded to the Tiasmyn group of the Early Scythian culture, as well as to the Kyiv group that evolved out of it, which covered the area of the forest-steppe zone on the western shore of the middle Dnipro River ranging from Kremenchuk to Kyiv, and where was located the main industrial centre of Scythia. The Aroteres were descendants of the population of the Chernoles culture over whom the Scythians had established themselves as a ruling class after their expulsion from West Asia, thus creating the Tiasmyn group of the Scythian culture, which soon expanded to the north to form the Kyiv group of the Scythian culture. Both the Tiasmyn and Kyiv groups were war-like populations organised into a series of small territorial units who lived in open undefended settlements, with the earliest one, dating from around 600 BC, being located at Taras Hill.

==== The Callipidae ====
The Scythian kurgans in the country of the Callipidae tribe were located in small groups, and were richly equipped with Greek pottery and bronze articles, with an early one of these containing scale armour, and weapons such as daggers and bronze arrowheads.

Several earthworks, settlements, and flat cemeteries from the Scythian period located on the wide strip of land to the immediate north coast of the Black Sea between the limans of the Dnister and of the Southern Buh or Dnipro belonged to the Scythian tribe of the Callipidae. Several remains from this tribe are known from the valley of the Southern Buh up to Voznesensk in the north and the Dnister River in the west.

==== Nomadic Scythian burials ====
Burials in the territory of the tribe of the Nomadic Scythians from the Early Scythian period largely consisted of reused kurgans, and only few aristocratic burials, which belonged to members of the local ruling class who held close trade relations with Pontic Olbia, are known from this period in this area:

- the earliest of these was from Boltyshka and contained a painted East Greek vase.
- at Tomakivka, a Nomadic Scythian aristocrat had been buried in a Bronze Age kurgan in the 6th century BC, and its grave goods included a gold torque, a crescent-shaped gold plaque decorated with rows of animals, a gold chape, and 200 bronze arrowheads, with the golden objects being decorated with depictions of lion heads, triangles, and spirals, sometimes enamelled, in West Asian artistic styles. A scabbard from the Tomakivka kurgan was similar to one from the later Mid-Scythian period from the Simferopol area, and the Tomakivka's grave goods were unusual for the territory of the Nomadic Scythians, suggesting that the aristocrat buried within it was connected to the Royal Scythians who had arrived from West Asia.
- two aristocratic burials from Mykhaylovo-Apostolove consisted of a 5-metres long underground chamber.
- a grave of Baby included the oldest example of a gold plaque decorated with a recumbent stag image.
- an aristocratic kurgan from around 500 BC Hannivka contained an Ionian bronze mirror.

==== The Alazones ====
The country of the Alazones tribe appears to have become poorer during the early 6th century BC, when many of the rebuilt settlements of the Sabatynivka culture were destroyed by the Royal Scythians arriving from West Asia.

==== The Scythian Agriculturalists ====
Early Scythian period settlements of the Scythian Agriculturalist tribe were located at Khortytsia and Nyzhniy Rohachyk. Possibly belonging to this group are the settlements on the north-western coast of the Sea of Azov, between Kyrylivka and Mariupol, called "Obytichna 12 type" settlements, which developed from the local Bronze Age culture.

One Scythian kurgan from around 500 BC in the country of Hylaea, at Zelenivka, contained the burial of a regional Agriculturalist Scythian lord and his wife, and its grave goods included 13 arrowheads, a knife with an iron blade, as well as four gold earrings, a necklace made of gold and carnelian and clay beads, and an Ionian goddess-shaped bronze mirror handle.

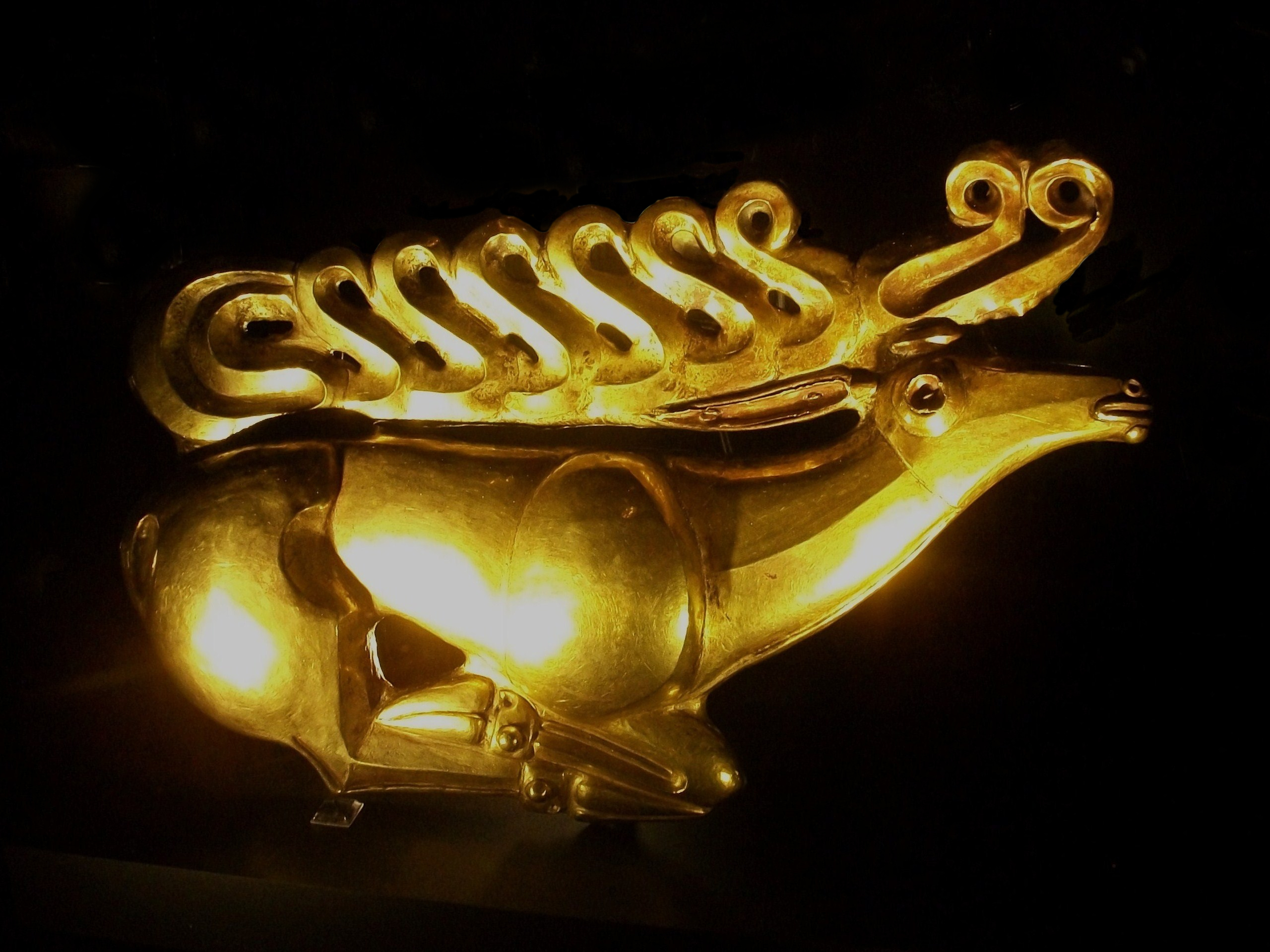
The famous gold stag of Kostromskaya, Russia

==== Scythian cities ====
Several fortified and unfortified Early Scythian settlements were located in the forest-steppe around the Dnipro River, in the country of the Aroteres, with the fortified ones significantly outnumbering those that were unfortified. These Early Scythian earthworks were of extensive sizes, and were made of hard-baked clay cores over which mounds of earth were raised, and which were strengthened by vertical wooden posts. These cities were surrounded by ramparts and moats, and the dwelling places contained within them were made of walls of adobe supported by timber frames which were built on the surface of the ground or sunk into the earth, and an acropolis which consisted of an additionally fortified area. Only small sections of the larger cities were occupied by buildings, which were usually restricted to the acropolis, and the unoccupied areas were used for penning livestock and as camps for the nomadic Scythians who seasonally visited the cities. These earthworks had within them kurgan cemeteries, lasting from the 6th to 3rd centuries, that each included up to 400 kurgans where their inhabitants were buried, showing that these sites had dense populations. The deceased of the common population were cremated or buried, usually laid on their backs or sometimes crouched, while the Scythian ruling class were buried in large, almost square, burial chambers dug into the earth and with posts in each corner and in the centre supporting their roofs, while some had a corridor and steps cut from the ground. The large earthworks of the Aroteres included:

- the site of Trakhtemyriv
- the site of Sharpivka near Zlatopil, dating from between 550 and 500 BC, and which included a large industrial quarter in which were located metal-working workshops that manufactured small implements and utensils; the presence of large numbers of Greek and Pontic Olbian pottery shards at Sharpivka attests to close contact between this site and Pontic Olbia.
- the site of Halushchyno, at Pastyrske near Zlatopil, which had a citadel-acropolis that was protected by three sets of walls, and must have been the seat of a local lord or governor of this district. Haluschyno included several Early Scythian pit-dwelling huts.
- one of the larger sites was that of Motronyn, which was 52 hectares in size, and was part of a set of forts built along the lower borderlands of the Tiasmyn group as protection against attacks by the steppe nomads.
- the largest of these earthworks was the earthwork of Bilsk (near the present-day village of Bilsk), located on the Vorskla River, and dating from the 8th to 4th centuries BC. The Bilsk site covered 4,400 hectares and had an outer rampart running a length of 30 kilometres, and possessed three acropoleis on the inside which respectively were 120, 67, and 15 hectares in size.

===== Reused pre-Scythian sites =====
In the western part of Scythia, although possibly outside of territory under Scythian control, was the largest earthwork to the west of the Dnipro River, at Myriv. It dated from between the 7th to 6th centuries BC and covered 1000 hectares, with a stream flowing through it, and it was encircled by a wall which was 6 to 9 metres height, 32 metres thick at the base, and 5.5 kilometres long. This earthwork was destroyed by an attack at one point and was later rebuilt on a larger scale, and it has tentatively been suggested that it had initially been built during the pre-Scythian period by the native people of the Gáva-Holigrady culture, and was later destroyed by the first Scythian invasion during the 7th century BC, after which it was rebuilt as a place of refuge for the population of the surrounding territory. Objects found in the Myriv earthwork include shards of late 7th or early 6th century BC East Greek pottery, a fragment of a 6th-century BC, horse- and dog-shaped figures, and many animal bones in the kitchen refuse. The large amount of imported Greek pottery found at Myriv shows that this site maintained active commercial relations with Borysthenes, the first Greek colony which had been founded on the northern shores of the Black Sea around 625 BC.

An earthwork from Severynivka was similarly built in the pre-Scythian Late Bronze Age, and continued to be occupied during the Early Scythian period. Defensive structures were added to the site considerably late after its construction, and it included several graves in which were buried crouched skeletons similar to the burials of the Podolian group of the Scythian Culture, but no Scythian kurgans or Greek pottery.

===== Free Scythian sites =====
Burial sites at Konstantinovsk and at the Liventsovka earthwork in Rostov-on-Don belonged to the Free Scythians. The Liventsovka earthwork was also an ancient harbour during the Early Scythian period, in the 6th to 5th centuries BC, when Greek merchants passed through it to sell to the local Scythians the Ionian pottery which they used as grave goods.

The Early Scythian culture experienced important changes between 550 and 500 BC, and it ended with the close of the 6th century BC.

==== The Agathyrsi ====
The tribe of the Agathyrsi belonged to the Scythian culture, and Scythian-type archaeological remains found to the west of Scythia proper, such as in western Podolia, central Transylvania, and in areas corresponding to modern-day Hungary and Slovakia as well as in parts of Romania and Bessarabia, might have corresponded to the Agathyrsi. These remains had specific characteristics which reflected the absorption of local Thracian elements by the Scythic incomers.

The western Podolian group of the Scythian culture, which corresponded to a section of the Agathyrsi, was closely related to the Tiasmyn group of the Scythian culture, which itself corresponded to the Scythian tribe of the "Scythian Ploughmen," who were themselves, like the Agathyrsi, a population of Thracian origin with an Iranic ruling class.

Many of the settlements of the Bessarabian group of the Scythian culture located on the middle Dnister river, which also corresponded to the Agathyrsi, were destroyed in the late 6th century BC, possibly due to the Persian invasion of Scythia.

To the archaeological presence of the Agathyrsi belongs a cemetery from the 8th to 7th centuries BC at Stoicani, as well as the Stincesti-Cotnari type fortified settlements which first appear in the 6th century BC.

==== The Zolnichnaya culture ====
Outside of the Pontic Scythian kingdom itself, some splinter Scythian groups in the East European Forest Steppe formed the Vorskla and Sula-Donets groups of the Scythian Culture, which are sometimes collectively called the Zolnichnaya (that is "Ash-Mounds") culture because of the presence of several zolnyk (зольник), that is ash mounds containing refuse from kitchens and other sources, near dwellings.

Hundreds of kurgans and more than 150 settlements belonging to the Zolnichnaya culture have been recorded and excavated. These groups are distinctively Scythian, and consist of settlements, earthworks, and burials concentrated in the valleys of the rivers Vorskla, Sula, and Donets, from which they derive their names.

The Sula and Donets groups of the Scythian culture contained an important element of the Srubnaya culture in their substratum, although there were some differences between the Donets and Sula groups. The groups of the Zolnichnaya culture were closely related to each other, with the Vorskla group nevertheless exhibiting enough significant differences from the Sula and Donets groups that the latter two are sometimes grouped together as a Sula-Donets group distinct from the Vorskla group.

===== The Sula group =====
The Sula group of the Scythian culture, which was the largest Scythian culture group of the eastern European forest steppe zone, corresponded to the tribe of the Androphagi.

Several earthworks belonging to the Sula group of the Scythian culture had been built in the 6th century BC, and were abandoned in the 4th century BC. The largest of these earthworks was at Basivka on the upper Sula river, and it was 2 kilometres long and 500 to 600 metres wide, with 2 metre wide moats, and ramparts which were 3 metres high and 8 metres wide; like at in the Tiasmyn group, the core of the Basivka earthwork was of baked clay. The presence of sherds of Greek pottery and other imported goods from the late 6th century BC attests of the establishment of trade relations with the Greek colonies on the northern shores of the Black Sea.

The Sula group included of kurgan cemeteries which could possess till 450 kurgans and included richly furnished burials of nobles, of which many were up to 20 metres high and 90 metres in diametre. The earlier graves of the Sula group contained many weapons and large numbers of goods originating from Ciscaucasia, suggesting that they were brought there from Scythians from the Caucasus, including from those migrating from the Kuban, but mostly from those arriving from northern Ciscaucasia.

Similarly to the Tiasmyn group of the Scythian culture, the equipment of the Sula group's burials consisted of weapons, such as Ciscaucasian type battle-axes, scale armour, "finials" crowned with animal or other figures, and horse gear.

The largest and one of the earliest kurgans of the Sula group is Starsha mohyla, located at Pustoviytivka: its grave shaft was 8.5 metres long, 5.7 metres wide, and 4 metres deep. It had already been partly looted by the time it was excavated, due to which no gold articles or Greek pottery were found there, although it still contained a large number of weapons, two bronze "standards" or "pole tops," and many horse harness parts, including 15 pairs of bits as well as antler or bone cheek-pieces. Many objects in Starsha mohyla were decorated in the Scythian animal style.

Another aristocratic burial belonging to the Sula group was the Shumeyko kurhan, located at Vokivtsi.

Human and horse sacrifices were only rarely present in Sula group burials, and horse harnesses were instead placed in the graves; these harnesses could amount up to 18 or 20 for a single grave. Occasionally, some 6th century BC Greek pottery could also be found in these burials. The horses' cheek pieces in these burials were largely made of bone or antler, and their iron terminals were decorated with carvings of elk, horse, or ram heads in the Scythian animal style of art; the bones used to make these came largely from domestic animals and only 10% were from wild animals, attesting of the importance of agriculture and farming among the Androphagi.

The intact and unbroken human bones of seventeen individuals were found along with cut and broken animal bones in the kitchen refuse of seven earthworks of the Sula group. This seems to confirm the claims of Herodotus of Halicarnassus that the Androphagi were the only ones who practised cannibalism among the peoples living near Scythia, although traces of similar ritual cannibalism are recorded from seven earthworks of the Melanchlaeni and Budini, as well as in the Smiela kurgan 15, which was one of the earliest burials of the Tiasmyn group of the Scythian culture.

===== The Donets group =====
The Donets group of the Scythian culture corresponded to the tribe of the Melanchlaeni, and it covered the basin of the upper Donets river in the forest-steppe.

The Donets group was closely related to the Sula group, and consisted of Early Scythian period 80 settlements, 20 earthworks, and 25 kurgan cemeteries in the forest zone on the middle Donets river, especially in the area of Kharkiv and Izium; although these were similar to those of the Sula group, they were of lesser quality.

The burial rites of the Donets group of the Scythian culture showed connections with the Bondarikha culture and the other local Late Bronze Age cultures which formed the substratum of the Scythian culture of the whole of the region around the middle Donets river.

The burials of the Donets group were almost always secondary ones in more ancient kurgans, and their graves were located at the bottom of quadrangular shafts which were usually covered in timber. Although none of the deceased in these graves had been cremated, they sometimes contained the remains of immolated human sacrifices.

Only a small number of the graves of the Donets group contained Greek pottery or bronze or gold or silver jewellery, although they were better equipped in grave goods than those from the steppe from the same time period. However, many of the Donets group graves had already been plundered in antiquity itself.

Intact human bones were found among the kitchen refuse of the earthworks of the Donets group, suggesting that the Melanchlaeni also practised ritual cannibalism.

===== The Vorskla group =====
The Vorskla group of the Scythian culture corresponded to the tribe of the Budini and was formed in the 7th century BC.

The settlements of the Vorskla group were largely open and located in its southern part, and the few earthworks belonging to it were located in its northern peripheral regions.

The open settlements of the Vorskla group consisted of ground-level huts.

The largest settlement of the Vorskla group was located at Bilsk hillfort, and consisted of a single defensive system made up of three earthworks which was surrounded by regular ramparts: the two earlier earthworks had been built before the third one, and first two and the third ramparts had likely been built by different peoples. These fortifications enclosed an area of 44020 hectares within which were the two earlier earthworks, which had been built in the middle to late 7th century BC, and which were located at 5 kilometres from each other. The site of Bilsk corresponded to the city of Gelonus, which was an important trade and industrial centre which had been built in the middle of the 6th century BC and stopped operating in the late 4th century BC.

The two earthworks were inhabited by the Budini and the Gelonians, who lived in separate sections of the city: the Gelonians lived in the eastern earthwork, the site of the city's industrial, commercial, and political centre; the poorer native Budini lived in the western earthwork.

Within the eastern earthwork, remains of several workshops were found, where copper and iron ores were brought to the city, where they were smelted.

The western earthwork has yielded pottery derived from a local type of the Bondarikha culture which was similar to those of the Sula-Donets group, as well as a Naue IIa type bronze flange-hilted sword originating from Central Europe.

Large amounts of Greek pottery were found in both earthworks, attesting of the role of Gelonus on the trade route which started from Pontic Olbia and continued northeastwards into the steppe and forest-steppe regions.

The kurgans of the Vorskla group were located in larger cemeteries which were attached to settlements or earthworks, with the Machukhy cemetery consisting of more than 150 kurgans. The burials of the Vorskla group were mostly poorly furnished, although two rich burials were located at Lykhachivka, close to Gelonus.

A wooden bow-case discovered at Opishnia and a quiver found at Vitova mogila were both decorated with rows of small figures pressed from below in thin gold plates: the decoration on the bow-case represented undefined animals; the decoration on the quiver instead depicted rows of panthers, ibexes, and griffins typical of West Asian decorative art styles.

The third earthwork was built later, in the 4th century BC, to defend the river port adjoining the city.

=== Mid-Scythian ===
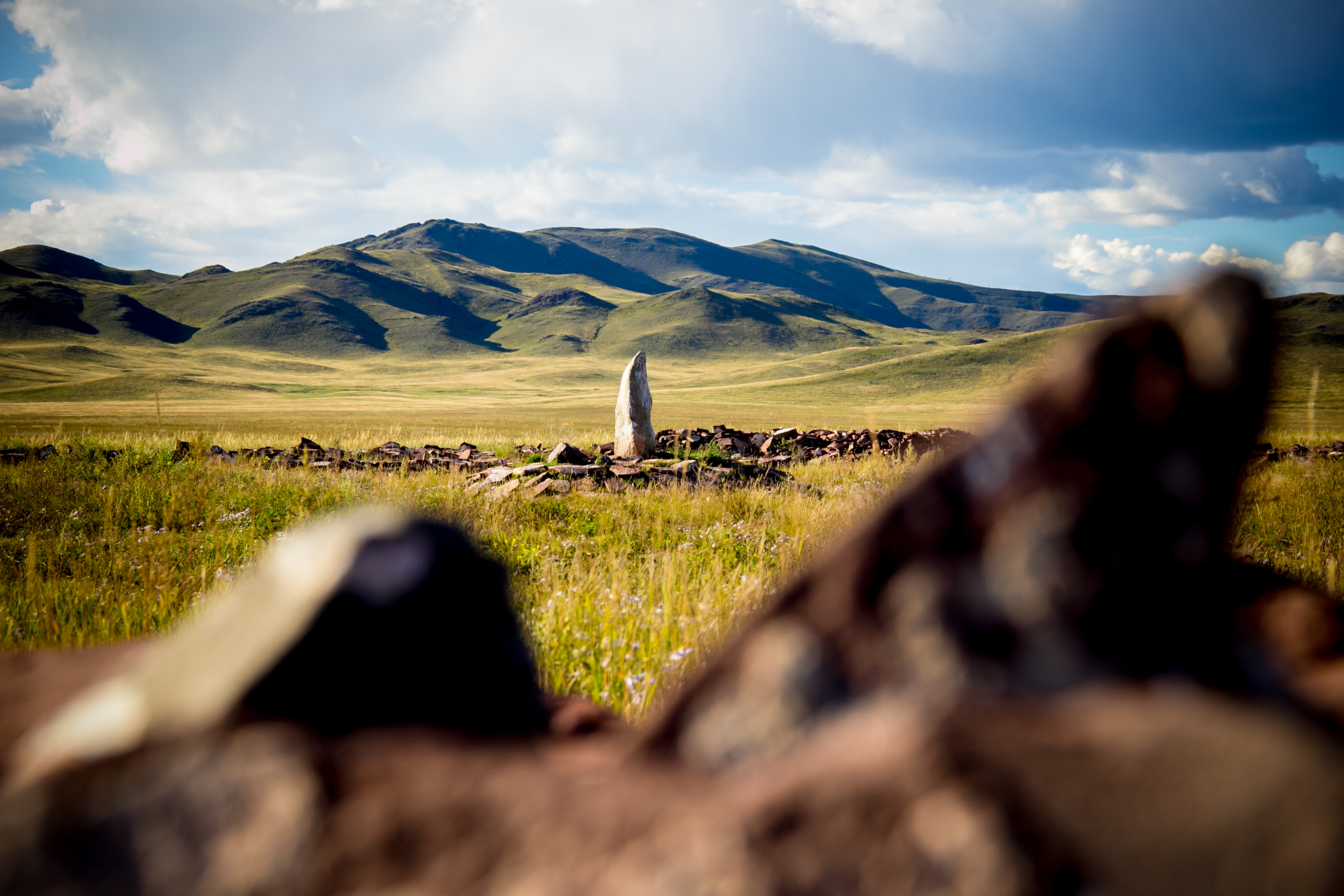
Arzhan kurgan in Tuva Republic, southern Siberia, Russia

Over the course of the late 6th and early 5th centuries BC, the Royal Scythians had lost control over Ciscaucasia and moved their centre of power towards the lower course of the Dnipro River, which happened at the same time as a wave of Sauromatian immigrants arrived from the Volga Steppe. These migrations led to significant changes in the Scythian culture which are not attributable to a direct evolution of the Pontic steppe's Scythian culture, as a result of which a new period of the Scythian culture started at the end of the 6th century BC, called the Mid-Scythian or Classical Scythian culture, which is variously considered by Scythologists as either a new stage of the Scythian culture or as a new archaeological culture altogether.

==== The Sindian culture ====
As the Scythians lost more territory in Ciscaucasia to the Sauromatians over the course of the late 6th century BC, the Sindi remained the only Scythian group still present in the region, and by the 5th century BC, Sindica was the only place in the Caucasus where the Scythian culture survived. The Scythian ruling class in the Maeotian country in Ciscaucasia had initially buried their dead in kurgans while the native Maeotian populace were buried in flat cemeteries, and burials in the Sindian country continued this tradition, with members of the Sindi ruling class continuing to be buried in kurgans and the Maeotians continuing to be buried in flat graves. After these movements, no Scythian burials of the Mid-Scythian are known from Ciscaucasia, which ceased being part of Scythian territory; although the Mid-Scythian period kurgans at the Seven Brothers, Yelizavetovskaya, and Ulski contained elements of the Scythian Culture, they belonged to the Sindi rather than to the Pontic Scythians.

==== Changes in Scythia ====
After the Royal Scythians had lost control of Ciscaucasia in the south-east over the course of 550 to 500 BC, they moved their centre of power from the north-west to the region of the lower Dnipro River in the late 6th and early 5th centuries BC, and a fully developed Scythian culture with no local forerunners consequently appeared in this region: this Scythian culture included rich burials, which started appearing in the lower Dnipro area, where they were concentrated in the region of the Dnipro rapids, and whose contents and burial rites included horse harnesses and decorative plaques, as well as human and horse sacrifices, which were similar to and continued the tradition of Scythian burials of western Ciscaucasia which the Royal Scythians had adopted during their stay in West Asia, albeit with fewer sacrifices. Some aristocratic burials of the Mid-Scythian period were also found in the forest steppe region, although they were less prominent than those within the steppe proper.

The changes in Scythian material culture which occurred during the Mid-Scythian periods were partially the result of an evolution of the Early Culture, but largely consisted of new elements introduced by nomadic immigrants who had arrived from the east some time between 550 and 500 BC, as well as of the Hellenising influence on the Scythian ruling classes of contacts with the Greek colonies on the north shore of the Black Sea. Material features of the Mid-Scythian culture included:

- a complete change in types of horse bridles:
  - the bronze bridle bits with ends shaped like stirrups disappeared and were replaced by iron bits with loop-shaped bent ends
  - the shape of the cheek-pieces changed; during the 5th century BC, they were shaped like overturned S- or L-letters or, less commonly, like the letter C; this letter C-shaped form became the standard Scythian cheek-piece form
  - the Mid-Scythian cheek-pieces had two holes, rather than three in the previous periods, and were inserted into loops at the ends of the cheek-piece instead of directly attached to them
- some changes in weaponry:
  - bows and arrows remained the most common Scythian weapons:
    - elongated bronze arrowheads with three lobes, three edges, and inner or slightly protruding sockets became the norm and underwent only slight changes
    - the shape of the gorytoi changed slightly
    - the bows' shape and structure remained unchanged
  - Scythian spearheads became more elongated
  - the shape of the crossguards of swords and daggers changed:
    - the crossguards of the akīnakai became thinner and their terminals became claw-shaped
    - the crossguards of most swords and daggers became narrow and triangle-shaped with a notch on their lower edges, and an oval terminal
  - Kuban-type cast helmets were no longer used and had even been replaced by scale helmets made of iron or bronze plates
  - the use of Greek helmets became more widespread, with the Attic helmet being the most popular, although the Scythians also used Corinthian, Chalcidic, and Thracian helmets
  - the use of Greek greaves became popular during the 4th century BC
  - local scale armour made of iron or bronze plates was still used by the Scythians
- terminals were still used by the Scythians, with some of these appearing to have been evolutions of Early Scythian type ones, although the most common types had small bells hung from them and were flat and decorated with images of animals, animal attack scenes, and sometimes human-like images
- "Olbian type" mirrors with a side handle whose ends were decorated with Animal Style depictions of animals had been in use between 550 and 500 BC
- some features of the Animal Style art of the Scythians underwent an evolution:
  - some older motifs fell into disuse and were replaced by newer ones
  - Scythian art in the 4th century BC experienced significant Greek influence during the 4th century BC, and a large number of toreutics from Scythian royal and aristocratic tombs had been manufactured by Greek artisans.

==== Settlements ====
Several cities existed within Scythia during the Mid-Scythian period. These included several temporary encampments, but no permanent settlements, in the area around Shcheglova near Kramatorsk, as well as earlier sites in the forest-steppe which were still inhabited, and newly founded settlements such as the one at Khotiv.

The many changes resulting from the migrations which ushered in the Mid-Scythian period included the Tiasmyn group's loss of its dominant position due to these migrations during the early 5th century BC, when the centre of power in Scythia later moved southwards towards the area of the Dnipro River's bend, although the Tiasmyn group still remained powerful. With some of the Scythians starting to become sedentary farmers over the course of the 4th century BC, multiple fortified and unfortified settlements where agriculturists lived were built in the region of the Dnipro's lower reaches, and Scythians also became part of the settled population of the khōra of Pontic Olbia.

The centre of Scythian power instead moved to the site of Kamyanka on the Dnipro River, which was the most important city of Scythia during the Mid-Scythian period, being both a centre of manufacturing and a political centre. The imported goods, such as Greek pottery, found in the acropolis of Kamyanka attests that it enjoyed close relations with the Bosporan cities. The Kamyanka site had been built in the 5th century BC, and it consisted of a large earthwork covering 1,200 hectares and made of two principal parts:

- the largest part of the Kamyanka site was an important industrial and metallurgical centre where bog iron ores were smelted into iron and made into tools, simple ornaments and weapons for the agricultural population of the Dnipro valley and of other regions of Scythia, with the sedentary population of the city being largely metal-workers, while the city itself was the most prominent supplier of metal products to the nomadic Scythians.
  - only a small part of the Kamyanka city-site had buildings, which were largely houses measuring 10 by 20 metres and were raised over oval and rectangular dugouts.
- the smaller part of Kamyanka was its "acropolis," which was the administrative centre of Scythia and the capital of its kings, and served as a residence for the Scythian king Ateas.
  - most of the Kamyanka city possessed no buildings, and was reserved for the Scythian king and his retinue to set up their encampments during seasonal visits to the city.

The Mid-Scythian huts of Halushchyno from the 4th to 3rd centuries BC were built on the surface of the land, unlike the pit-dwellings from the Early Scythian period.

==== Eastern cultural elements ====
The immigration of Sauromatian nomads into Scythia in the early 5th century BC and their intermarriage with the Pontic Scythians introduced articles from eastern Eurasia into the Pontic steppe. Such elements appeared in the Sula-Donets group of the Scythian culture, but also in the Kyiv region, where were found bronze daggers from the Tagar culture, which had been produced in Siberia in the 6th century BC and arrived in Pontic Scythian during the 5th century BC. Individuals of East Asian origins started appearing for the first time in the graves of the Tiasmyn group of the Scythian culture as well, and a skeleton of a Central Asian camel was found in the aristocratic tomb of Novosilka near Lypovets while individual camel bones were found in the earthwork of Kamyanka. The earthwork of Myriv was destroyed for a second and final time by these Sauromatian elements in the 5th century BC.

==== Burials ====
Other changes included the introduction of elements from the eastern steppe, including the introduction and popularisation of "catacomb" or "niche" graves made of a vertical entrance shaft and one or many deep niches or underground burial chambers dug into their wider side. These catacomb graves became more popular during the 5th to 4th centuries BC, and were especially used for the upper classes. The content of the Scythian burials also became more uniform across Scythia, and the differences between the local groups of the Scythian culture therefore decreased. Women were also buried in the same kurgans as the men, among both the upper class and the commoners, during this period.

===== Commoner burials =====
Another change resulting from the migrations of the early Mid-Scythian period was the new appearance of tombs of the commoners of Scythia, which had not been present in the steppe region until then. In some cases, the commoners were buried in pits. The grave goods of the commoners included weapons, local pottery, and stacked horse, cow or sheep bones with an iron knife in them for the men, and of bronze mirrors, jewelry, and beads; human or horse sacrifices were not present in these burials, and were instead replaced by parts of horse harnesses, including straps decorated with representations of Scythian-style animal figures, which for the better equipped tombs were made of gold and had been made by Greek artisans while the simpler plaques had been made in Scythian workshops. Also absent from these commoners' graves were Scythian animal style art, and gold articles, and some of these burials continued Late Srubnaya customs and practises, attesting to settlement continuity and to the adoption by the Late Srubnaya Scythians of the Scythian Culture imported from West Asia.

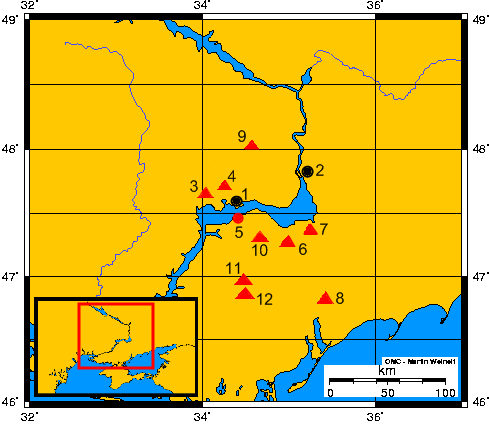
Distribution of Scythian kurgans and other sites along the Dnipro Rapids during the Mid-Scythian period

===== Aristocratic burials =====
Lavishly furnished tombs of members of the aristocracy also became more common during the Mid-Scythian period. Their structure was not different from the graves of the common people, and they were demarcated from these only by the richness and better quality of their grave goods, and by the presence of both human and animal sacrifices in these, although the horses were usually buried in separate graves within the same kurgan. These kurgans were located in the area around the southern part of the Dnipro River's bend, and extended to the Inhulets River in the west and to the Molochna River in the east. Most of these tombs had already been looted during antiquity itself, and only few have been found intact. 4th century BC graves of local lords from the Royal Scythians' territory were located in the regions of Mariupol, Berdiansk and Prymorsk, and more burials were found in the north-eastern borderlands of the Royal Scythians to the south of the Donets River, in the regions of Izium, Sloviansk, and Kramatorsk, with the earliest of them being a 5th-century BC kurgan from Shpakivka, while the rest were mostly poorly equipped burials in older Srubnaya kurgans which sometimes contained lone bronze ornaments but otherwise no weapons except for bronze arrowheads. 38 out of the 40 largest Scythian burials of the Middle period were royal ones which included between 3 and 10 attendants. A local lord was buried in a kurgan at Shcheglova near Kramatorsk alongside his attendant and his horse. Several burials in older Srubnaya kurgans were located to the south of the Dnipro's bend, in the area of the Molochna River, the region to the east of Skadovsk, and in the steppe to the north of the Syvash located near the border of Crimea. A few Srubnaya-type kurgans as well as bones of camels brought by Scythians were also found in Crimea.

By the Mid-Scythian period, some of the Scythian tombs, including several aristocratic ones, consisted of elaborate stone vaults modelled on Crimean Greek plans and structures, and most of the art decorating Scythian tombs no longer consisted of Scythian art, but of works done by Greek artisans with Scythian motifs and scenes representing Scythian life. These Greek-influenced burials were present both in Crimea, such as at Kul-Oba, and in the steppe to the south of the Dnipro, and they contained only small numbers of grave goods decorated in the Scythian animal style art.

Mid-Scythian burials of the late 6th to early 5th centuries BC include:

- in the region of the Dnipro rapids:
  - the Hostra Mohyla
  - Tomb 1 of Zavadska Mohyla
  - Tomb 5 of the site of Novohryhorivka
  - the site of Baby
  - the Rozkopana Mohyla, which contained the skulls of 17 horses and a large bronze cauldron cast in Pontic Olbia in the late 5th century BC. A c. 450 BC kurgan at Raskopana contained a semi-oval bronze cauldron on a hollow stand, two skeletons, and seven horse skulls. This practice of human and horse sacrifices is not known from earlier Nomadic Scythian sites, but was practised in the western Ciscaucasian burials of the Royal Scythians and was introduced into the Pontic Steppe after the latter lost control of the Kuban Steppe and retreated into the north Pontic region.
- in Crimea:
  - the Zolotyi Kurgan
  - Kulakovskyi Kurgan

Among the 4th century BC Scythian tombs are included:

- the richest and largest kurgans:
  - the Solokha kurgan, dating from the late 5th to early 4th century BC, and which was sumptuously furnished
  - the Velyka Tsymbalka Kurgan
  - the Ohuz Kurgan
  - the Kozel Kurgan
  - the Chortomlyk Kurgan, dated to c. 400 BC, in which were buried a Scythian king, his queen, multiple serfs, and a courtier. Most of its grave goods had already been ransacked in ancient times. The articles from this grave which had been recovered suggest that the royal family of Scythia had connections with the eastern regions, and the 250 decorated horse bridles, saddles, and finials from this tomb represented a symbolic immolation of many horses, recalling the 300 horses which had been immolated in the Ulski kurgan.
  - the remains of the aristocrat buried in the Oleksandropil Kurgan belonged to a Sauromatian from the Volga steppe, while the serfs buried in it belonged to Pontic Scythians. Among the eastern Eurasian elements in the Oleksandropilskiy kurgan were large Siberian cast-bronze cauldrons.
- a c. 350 BC burial of the Haimanova Mohyla contained the tomb of a Scythian king. It consisted of a large underground chamber with a dromos, in which were buried 10 persons, including the king and his family, as well as armed guards and women servants, and several horses of which only one skeleton but several bridles remained when the tomb was excavated. The burial had already been looted when it was excavated, but it included a hoard which remained intact and within which were vessels made of gold and of wood covered with gold leaf decorated with West Asian motifs. These, along with the human and animal sacrifices, continued the traditions of the older burials in western Ciscaucasia, and show that the king buried within it was of Royal Scythian origin.
- the second richest group of kurgans:
  - the Berdianskyi Kurgan,
  - the Tovsta Mohyla, in which were buried several persons, as well as six horses,
  - the Chmyreva Mohyla
  - Kurgan 8 of the Five Brothers Kurgans at Koisiuh
- the Melitopol kurgan
- the Zhovtokamianka Kurgan
- the Krasnokutskyi Kurgan

Around 3,000 Scythian funerary sites in the Pontic Steppe date from the 4th century BC, making this a significantly larger number compared to those recorded from all the previous periods of Scythian culture.

Around 30 burials of members of the Scythian aristocracy who had undergone significant Hellenisation were located near the Greek colony of Nymphaion, in Crimea, dating from the early 5th to the early 4th centuries BC. Many rich burials with Scythian features were also located in the necropolis of Nymphaion, as well as at the site of Kul-Oba; these burial belonged to members of the Scythian aristocracy who entertained close relations, including familial ones, with the ruling classes of Nymphaion and of the Bosporan kingdom, possibly even with the latter's ruling Spartocid dynasty.

Scythian burials from western Crimea during this period were however rare, and largely limited to two kurgans from the area of Simferopol, of which one was from around c. 500 BC and another one from the mid-fifth century BC, and a third one from Chornomorske on the western coast of Crimea, which belonged to an aristocrat and included three gold plaques each decorated with a recumbent stag, linking this aristocrat with the Royal Scythians.

Most Scythian burials in the Nomadic Scythians' territory, as well as the Scythian kurgans from Severynivka and from central and western Crimea, date from the Mid-Scythian period.

===== Sauromatian burials =====
In addition to these upper class Scythian burials, some 4th century BC Sauromatian tombs in the lower Dnipro area, at the sites of Hrushivka and Ushkalka, contained the bodies of Sauromatian migrants who had newly arrived into Scythian from the lower Volga steppe. These tombs included ones where were buried armed women, which specifically belonged to Sarmatian culture; these tombs contained bronze arrowheads in a quiver, a dagger, and one Sauromatian burial at Zarichne even contained scale armour.

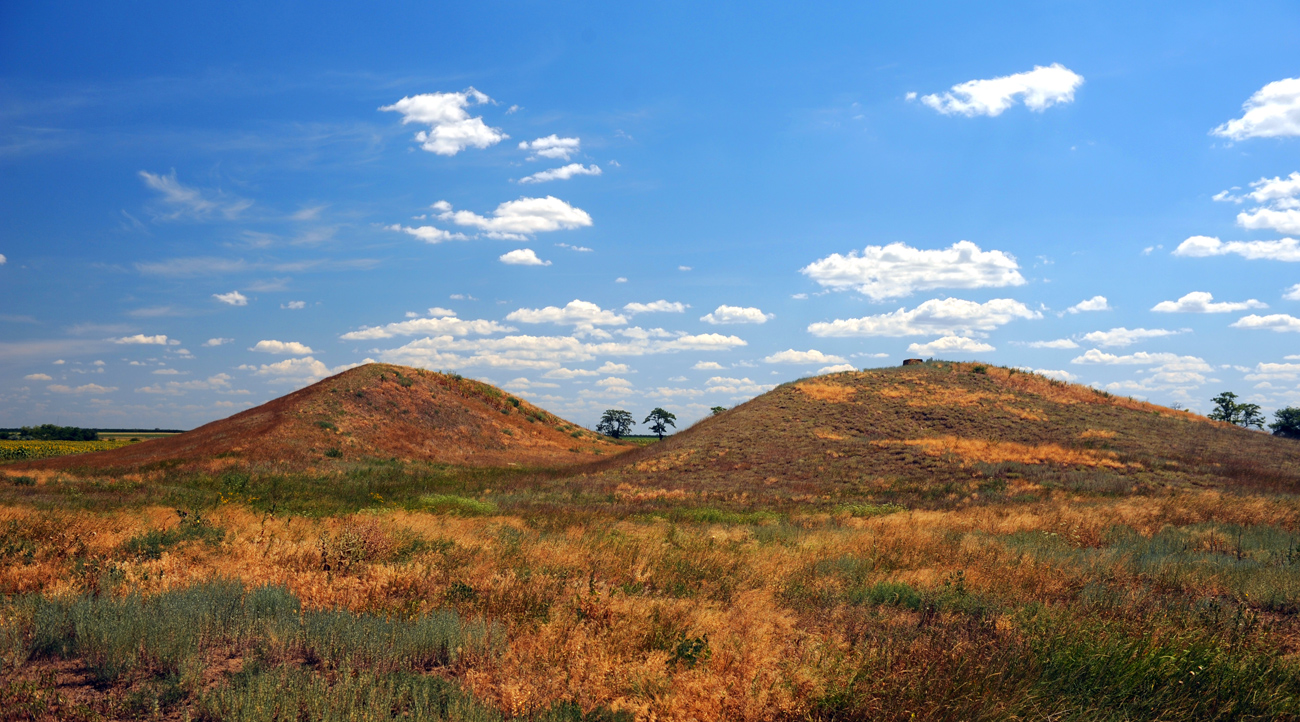
West side of the Kozel Kurgans

==== Trade ====
By the Late Scythian period of the 4th to 3rd centuries BC the market for Pontic Olbia was limited to a small part of western Scythia, while the rest of the kingdom's importations came from the Bosporan kingdom, especially from Panticapaeum, from where came most of Scythia's imported pottery, as well as richly decorated fine vases, rhyta, and decorative toreutic plaques for gorutoi. Unlike during the Early and Mid-Scythian periods, grave goods made in Pontic Olbia disappeared from the tombs of the upper class steppe Scythians, and were replaced by fine toreutics, plaques and ornaments made in the Bosporan kingdom. Contemporary grave goods across large distances in Scythia during this period were identical, such as the gold decorations of gorutoi from the Chortomlyk Mohyla, the Melitopol Kurgan, Illintsi, and Yelizavetovskaya aristocratic burials, were identical and had only slight adaptations based on the tastes of local aristocrats.

==== Wine consumption ====
Large numbers of Greek amphorae were found in the tombs of rank-and-file Scythians of the 4th to 3rd centuries BC, attesting to the prevalence of wine consumption among non-aristocrats during the Mid-Scythian period.

==== Evidence of hallucinogen use ====
Excavation at kurgan Sengileevskoe-2 found gold bowls with coatings indicating a strong opium beverage was used while cannabis was burning nearby. The gold bowls depicted scenes showing clothing and weapons.

==== Sindian fortresses ====
After earlier Scythian earthworks built in the 6th century BC along the right bank of the Kuban River were abandoned in the 4th century BC, when the Sauromatians took over most of Ciscaucasia, the Sindi built a new series of earthworks on their eastern borders. One of the Sindi earthworks was located at Yelizavetinskaya, where was located a c. 400 BC kurgan in which several humans were buried and which contained the skeletons of 200 horses.

==== Scythian remains to the south of the Danube ====
During the 4th century BC itself, Scythian objects started appearing in the Dobruja region, corresponding to the Scythians' expansion into that area, and possibly even into the territory corresponding to modern Bulgaria, where 4th century BC Berezovo-Panaguriste type aristocratic kurgans dependent on the Greek and Scythian cultures were found.

Within the Dobruja region, at Agighiol, is located a large and sumptuously furnished Scythian kurgan dating from the early 4th century. It contained a dromos and a burial chamber, as well as human and horse sacrifices, and was of the same type as contemporary burials from the southern parts of Scythia, such as those of Ohuz Mohyla, Solokha, and Kul-Oba, and like them it continues the burial traditions of the Early Scythians in western Ciscaucasia. The Agighiol burial included an elaborate stone tomb similar to Bosporan tombs, and its grave goods consisted of weapons, vases, and toreutics decorated in the Thraco-Scythian style, which was itself an adaptation of the North Pontic Scythian animal style art which still possessed West Asian influences; these goods were made by Greek goldsmiths from Histria, and many similar pieces of art were found from contemporary sites in Romania and Bulgaria, reflecting Scythian influence on Thracian art. The Agighiol kurgan belonged to a Scythian ruler who resided in the northern Dobruja region in the late 5th century BC was buried there in the early 4th century BC, and who may have been a predecessor or even the father of the famous Scythian king Ateas.

The Mid-Scythian period ended in the late 3rd century BC.

=== Late Scythian ===
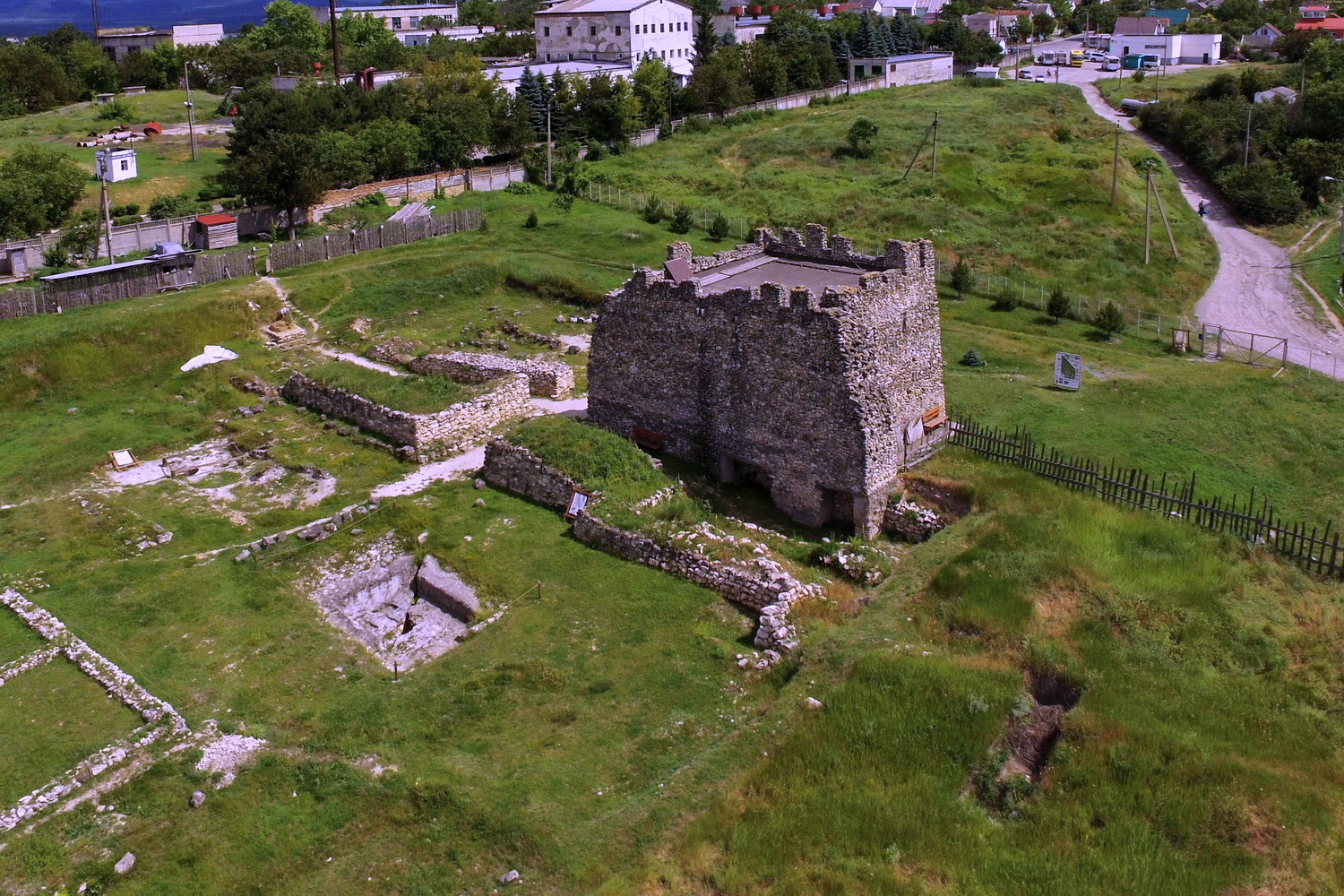
Remains of Scythian Neapolis near modern-day Simferopol, Crimea. It served as a political center of the Scythians in the Late Scythian period.

The Late Scythian period started in the late 3rd century BC, and was a new development with very little in common with the preceding Mid-Scythian culture. The Late Scythian culture was limited to Crimea and the area of the lower Dnipro River where the by then sedentary farmer Scythians were still living during this period, and it developed out of the admixture of the Mid-Scythian culture with the cultures of the Tauri who inhabited the Crimean mountains and the Greeks who lived on the northern shores of the Black Sea.

The material culture of the Late Scythians had few distinctive features of its own and was largely similar to that of their Greek neighbours, which has led to speculation that the populations of some of the Late Scythian settlements, such as those on the lower Dnipro, might have been partially composed of Greeks. Sarmatian and La Tène elements were also present in the Late Scythian culture.

==== Settlements ====
More than 100 fortified and unfortified settlements of the Late Scythian culture and their necropoleis have been found. Aside from the major metropoles located at Bilohirsk and at Scythian Neapolis, the largest Crimean Scythian settlements were in Pozharske, Ust-Alma, and Kermen-Kyr. All of these settlements, including the Scythian Neapolis and the site of Bilohirsk, combined local and Greek architectural techniques.

The Late Scythian sites were primarily found in the foothills of the Crimean mountains, and along the western coast of Crimea, with some of these being reused earlier Greek settlements, such as at Kalos Limen and Kerkinitis, while others were new foundations, and many of the settlements on the coast were trading ports.

An additional group of Late Scythian settlements was found on the lower Dnipro River. These belonged to a material culture that was similar to that of the Crimean Scythians, although it was more Hellenized than they were. These Lower Dnipro Scythians might have been closely connected to Pontic Olbia and possibly even dependent on it.

The Late Scythian sites of the Lower Danube Scythians in the Dobruja region have not been able to be identified.

===== Bilohirsk =====
The site of Bilohirsk was an early political centre of the Late Scythians from the 3rd century BC to between c. 200 and c. 150 BC. A well-protected fortress built according to Greek fortification techniques was built in this settlement.

===== Scythian Neapolis =====
The most important Late Scythian site in Crimea was the city of Scythian Neapolis, which succeeded the site of Bilohirsk as the capital of the Crimean Scythian kingdom.

Scythian Neapolis was protected by a defensive wall with towers and it contained houses whose walls were made of stone and mud bricks, with density of population of the city having varied across time. The construction techniques used for the buildings within the city were the same as those used by Greeks, although many of these buildings had been constructed carelessly, and non-Greek building traditions such as dugouts also existed in the city. A royal palace was built according to Greek architectural rules in Scythian Neapolis in the 2nd century BC.

In front of the facade of the royal palace of Scythian Neapolis was built in c. 125 BC the mausoleum of Argotos, which was a Doric-style in antis building decorated with a naiskos in relief and a verse inscription in the Greek language, and where were located several pedestals which supported the statues of Greek deities and which were inscribed with dedications were also located.

Another monumental mausoleum was built around c. 115 BC immediately outside Scythian Neapolis, near the city's central gates and resting against the outside of the defensive walls. This mausoleum belonged to the Crimean Scythian king Skilurus.

After the Crimean Scythian kingdom was defeated by the general Diophantes of the Kingdom of Pontus, the royal palace of Scythian Neapolis was destroyed and not rebuilt, and the city itself ceased being a metropole, although it still remained an important urban centre.

Beginning in the 1st century BC, a complex of Greek-type masonry buildings was erected in the northern part of Scythian Neapolis, which has been interpreted as having served as a "Northern Palace" from the middle 2nd until the early 3rd centuries AD. Scythian Neapolis might have remained a political centre for some of the Late Scythians during this period.

From between c. 50 and c. 100 AD to around c. 150 AD, buildings in Scythian Neapolis disappeared while the defensive walls were maintained and religious structures existed at the site. These developments, along with the replacement of the older funeral rites by new ones and changes within the local material culture, as well as some elements continuity from the previous periods, suggest that the sedentary Late Scythians were being assimilated by the nomadic Sarmatians at this time.

Over the course of between c. 175 and c. 200 AD up to c. 250 AD, Scythian Neapolis became a non-fortified settlement, within which were located some irregularly scattered buildings. Scythian Neapolis had stopped existing sometime between c. 225 and c. 250 AD.

==== Burials ====
Late Scythian burials can be separated into two types, namely those under kurgans, and those in flat necropoleis:

- Late Scythian kurgans consisted of stone vaults under earth mounds within which burials were performed over a large period of time, with the number of individuals buried in those ranging from a few persons to about 100 or more. Late Scythian kurgans were especially popular in the 2nd century BC, but some continued to be created during the 1st and 2nd centuries AD.
- Late Scythian flat necropoleis were more common than kurgans, with Scythian Neapolis containing three of these. Among the other dozen of Late Scythian necropoleis, the largest was located at Ust-Alma.
  - From the 2nd century BC to the 1st century AD, the flat necropoleis consisted of earth vaults in which several, sometimes up to 40, individuals were buried.
  - From c. 50 to c. 150 AD, the vaults in which several persons were buried were replaced by individual burials in graves which contained a side chamber. Sometimes the deceased were buried in simple flat graves.

The Late Scythian culture ended in the middle of the 3rd century AD.

== See also ==
- Maeotian culture
- Sauromatian culture

== Sources ==
- Bouzek, Jan [in Hungarian] (2001). "Cimmerians and Early Scythians: the Transition from Geometric to Orientalising Style in the Pontic Area". In Tsetskhladze, G.R. (ed.). North Pontic Archaeology: Recent Discoveries and Studies. Leiden, Netherlands: Brill Publishers. pp. 33–44. ISBN 978-9-004-12041-9.
- Batty, Roger (2007). Rome and the Nomads: The Pontic-Danubian Realm in Antiquity. Oxford: Oxford University Press. ISBN 978-0-198-14936-1.
- Diakonoff, I. M. (1985). "Media". In Gershevitch, Ilya (ed.). The Cambridge History of Iran: Volume. Vol. 2. Cambridge: Cambridge University Press. ISBN 978-0-521-20091-2.
- Harmatta, János (1996). "The Scythians". In Herrmann, Joachim [in German]; Zürcher, Erik (eds.). History of Humanity: From the seventh century B.C. to the seventh century A.D. Vol. 3. UNESCO. pp. 181–182. ISBN 923102812X.
- Ivantchik, Askold (2010). "Sinope et les Cimmériens" [Sinope and the Cimmerians]. Ancient Civilizations from Scythia to Siberia (in French). 16 (1–2): 65–72. doi:10.1163/157005711X560318.
- Ivantchik, Askold (25 April 2018). "Scythians". Encyclopædia Iranica.
- Jacobson, Esther (1995). The Art of the Scythians: The Interpenetration of Cultures at the Edge of the Hellenic World. Leiden, Netherlands: Brill Publishers. ISBN 978-9-004-09856-5.
- Melyukova, A. I. (1990). "The Scythians and Sarmatians". In Sinor, Denis (ed.). The Cambridge History of Early Inner Asia. Cambridge, United Kingdom: Cambridge University Press. pp. 97–117. ISBN 978-0-521-24304-9.
- Olbrycht, Marek Jan (2000a). "The Cimmerian Problem Re-Examined: the Evidence of the Classical Sources". In Pstrusińska, Jadwiga [in Polish]; Fear, Andrew (eds.). Collectanea Celto-Asiatica Cracoviensia. Kraków: Księgarnia Akademicka. pp. 71–100. ISBN 978-8-371-88337-8.
- Olbrycht, Marek Jan (2000b). "Remarks on the Presence of Iranian Peoples in Europe and Their Asiatic Relations". In Pstrusińska, Jadwiga [in Polish]; Fear, Andrew (eds.). Collectanea Celto-Asiatica Cracoviensia. Kraków: Księgarnia Akademicka. pp. 101–140. ISBN 978-8-371-88337-8.
- Sulimirski, T. (1985). "The Scyths". In Gershevitch, I. (ed.). The Cambridge History of Iran. Vol. 2. Cambridge University Press. pp. 149–199. ISBN 978-1-139-05493-5.
- Sulimirski, Tadeusz; Taylor, T. F. (1991). "The Scythians". In Boardman, John; Edwards, I. E. S.; Hammond, N. G. L.; Sollberger, E.; Walker, C. B. F. (eds.). The Cambridge Ancient History. Vol. 3. Cambridge: Cambridge University Press. pp. 547–590. ISBN 978-1-139-05429-4.
