= Alören =

Alören can refer to:

- Alören, Gümüşhacıköy
- Alören, Mecitözü
