= Çitli =

Çitli can refer to:

- Çitli, Gümüşhacıköy
- Çitli, Mecitözü
