= Sarıhasan, Mecitözü =

Village in Turkey

Sarıhasan
- Village
- Location in Turkey
- Coordinates: 40.591°N 35.294°E
- Country: Turkey
- Province: Çorum
- District: Mecitözü
- Population (2022): 264
- Time zone: UTC+3 (TRT)

Sarıhasan is a village of Mecitözü District in Çorum Province, Turkey. Its population is 264 (2022). It is 45 km from Çorum and 9 km from Mecitözü.

== Population ==
Historical population
| Year | Pop. | ±% p.a. |
|---|---|---|
| 1997 | 427 | — |
| 2007 | 376 | −1.26% |
| 2012 | 316 | −3.42% |
| 2017 | 289 | −1.77% |
| 2022 | 264 | −1.79% |
Source: 1997 census and TÜIK (2007-2022)
