= Sülüklü =

Sülüklü can refer to:

- Sülüklü, Mecitözü
- Sülüklü, Narman
