= Vakıflar =

Vakıflar can refer to:

- Vakıflar, Mecitözü
- Vakıflı, Samandağ
- Vakıflar (İzmir Metro)
