= Aşağıovacık =

Aşağıovacık (literally "little lower plains" or "below are little plains") is a Turkish place name that may refer to the following places in Turkey:

- Aşağıovacık, Gerede, a village in the district of Gerede, Bolu Province
- Aşağıovacık, Hamamözü, a village in the district of Gümüşhacıköy, Amasya Province
- Aşağıovacık, Karakoçan
- Aşağıovacık, Kızılırmak
