= Bekişler, Mecitözü =

Village in Turkey

Bekişler
- Village
- Location in Turkey
- Coordinates: 40°32′N 35°08′E
- Country: Turkey
- Province: Çorum
- District: Mecitözü
- Population (2022): 300
- Time zone: UTC+3 (TRT)

Bekişler is a village in the Mecitözü District of Çorum Province in Turkey. Its population is 300 (2022).
