= Yeşilova, Mecitözü =

Village in Turkey

Yeşilova
- Village
- Country: Turkey
- Province: Çorum
- District: Mecitözü
- Population (2022): 50
- Time zone: UTC+3 (TRT)

Yeşilova is a village in the Mecitözü District of Çorum Province in Turkey. Its population is 50 (2022).
