= Fındıklı, Mecitözü =

Village in Turkey

Fındıklı
- Village
- Country: Turkey
- Province: Çorum
- District: Mecitözü
- Population (2022): 51
- Time zone: UTC+3 (TRT)

Fındıklı is a village in the Mecitözü District of Çorum Province in Turkey. Its population is 51 (2022). The village is populated by Kurds.
