= Çalköy, Gümüşhacıköy =

Çalköy
- Village
- Location within Turkey
- Coordinates: 41.0469°N 35.1274°E
- Country: Turkey
- Province: Amasya
- District: Gümüşhacıköy
- Population (2021): 318
- Time zone: UTC+3 (TRT)

Çalköy is a village in the Gümüşhacıköy District, Amasya Province, Turkey. Its population is 318 (2021).
