= Karakaya, Gümüşhacıköy =

Karakaya
- Village
- Location within Turkey
- Coordinates: 40.8565°N 35.1698°E
- Country: Turkey
- Province: Amasya
- District: Gümüşhacıköy
- Population (2021): 46
- Time zone: UTC+3 (TRT)

Karakaya is a village in the Gümüşhacıköy District, Amasya Province, Turkey. Its population is 46 (2021).
