= Aşağı Körücek, Mecitözü =

Village in Turkey

Aşağı Körücek
- Village
- Location in Turkey
- Coordinates: 40.4909°N 35.1378°E
- Country: Turkey
- Province: Çorum
- District: Mecitözü
- Population (2022): 28
- Time zone: UTC+3 (TRT)

Aşağı Körücek is a village in the Mecitözü District of Çorum Province in Turkey. Its population is 28 (2022).
