= Dumanlı, Gümüşhacıköy =

Dumanlı
- Village
- Location within Turkey
- Coordinates: 41.0286°N 35.1708°E
- Country: Turkey
- Province: Amasya
- District: Gümüşhacıköy
- Population (2021): 150
- Time zone: UTC+3 (TRT)

Dumanlı is a village in the Gümüşhacıköy District, Amasya Province, Turkey. Its population is 150 (2021).
