= Akpınar, Mecitözü =

Village in Turkey

Akpınar
- Village
- Location in Turkey
- Coordinates: 40.4452°N 35.1063°E
- Country: Turkey
- Province: Çorum
- District: Mecitözü
- Population (2022): 66
- Time zone: UTC+3 (TRT)

Akpınar is a village in the Mecitözü District of Çorum Province in Turkey. Its population is 66 (2022).
