= Köseeyüp, Mecitözü =

Village in Turkey

Köseeyüp
- Village
- Location in Turkey
- Coordinates: 40°34′N 35°22′E
- Country: Turkey
- Province: Çorum
- District: Mecitözü
- Population (2022): 227
- Time zone: UTC+3 (TRT)

Köseeyüp is a village in the Mecitözü District of Çorum Province in Turkey. Its population is 227 (2022).
