= Kışlacık, Mecitözü =

Village in Turkey

Kışlacık
- Village
- Country: Turkey
- Province: Çorum
- District: Mecitözü
- Population (2022): 240
- Time zone: UTC+3 (TRT)

Kışlacık is a village in the Mecitözü District of Çorum Province in Turkey. Its population was 240 as of 2022.
