= Söğütönü, Mecitözü =

Village in Turkey

Söğütönü
- Village
- Location in Turkey
- Coordinates: 40.4083°N 35.3466°E
- Country: Turkey
- Province: Çorum
- District: Mecitözü
- Population (2022): 90
- Time zone: UTC+3 (TRT)

Söğütönü is a village in the Mecitözü District of Çorum Province in Turkey. Its population is 90 (2022).
