= Pusacak, Gümüşhacıköy =

Pusacak
- Village
- Location within Turkey
- Coordinates: 41°02′10″N 35°09′13″E
- Country: Turkey
- Province: Amasya
- District: Gümüşhacıköy
- Population (2021): 226
- Time zone: UTC+3 (TRT)

Pusacak is a village in the Gümüşhacıköy District, Amasya Province, Turkey. Its population is 226 (2021).
