= Yazıyeri, Gümüşhacıköy =

Yazıyeri
- Village
- Location within Turkey
- Coordinates: 40°53′21″N 35°18′17″E
- Country: Turkey
- Province: Amasya
- District: Gümüşhacıköy
- Population (2021): 158
- Time zone: UTC+3 (TRT)

Yazıyeri is a village in the Gümüşhacıköy District, Amasya Province, Turkey. Its population is 158 (2021).
