= Sekü, Gümüşhacıköy =

Sekü
- Village
- Location within Turkey
- Coordinates: 40.9333°N 35.1260°E
- Country: Turkey
- Province: Amasya
- District: Gümüşhacıköy
- Population (2021): 112
- Time zone: UTC+3 (TRT)

Sekü is a village in the Gümüşhacıköy District, Amasya Province, Turkey. Its population is 112 (2021).
