= Yedigöz, Mecitözü =

Village in Turkey

Yedigöz
- Village
- Location in Turkey
- Coordinates: 40°31′14″N 35°26′03″E
- Country: Turkey
- Province: Çorum
- District: Mecitözü
- Population (2022): 77
- Time zone: UTC+3 (TRT)

Yedigöz is a village in the Mecitözü District of Çorum Province in Turkey. Its population is 77 (2022).
