= İbek, Mecitözü =

Village in Turkey

İbek
- Village
- Location in Turkey
- Coordinates: 40°23′N 35°14′E
- Country: Turkey
- Province: Çorum
- District: Mecitözü
- Population (2022): 344
- Time zone: UTC+3 (TRT)

İbek is a village in the Mecitözü District of Çorum Province in Turkey. Its population is 344 (2022).
