= Derbentobruğu, Gümüşhacıköy =

Derbentobruğu
- Village
- Location within Turkey
- Coordinates: 40°58′N 35°08′E
- Country: Turkey
- Province: Amasya
- District: Gümüşhacıköy
- Population (2021): 191
- Time zone: UTC+3 (TRT)

Derbentobruğu is a village in the Gümüşhacıköy District, Amasya Province, Turkey. Its population is 191 (2021).
