= Emirbağı, Mecitözü =

Village in Turkey

Emirbağı
- Village
- Location in Turkey
- Coordinates: 40°25′N 35°16′E
- Country: Turkey
- Province: Çorum
- District: Mecitözü
- Population (2022): 239
- Time zone: UTC+3 (TRT)

Emirbağı is a village in the Mecitözü District of Çorum Province in Turkey. Its population is 239 (2022).
