= Bacakoğlu, Gümüşhacıköy =

Bacakoğlu
- Village
- Location within Turkey
- Coordinates: 40°58′N 35°05′E
- Country: Turkey
- Province: Amasya
- District: Gümüşhacıköy
- Population (2021): 167
- Time zone: UTC+3 (TRT)

Bacakoğlu is a village in the Gümüşhacıköy District, Amasya Province, Turkey. Its population is 167 (2021).
