= Terken, Mecitözü =

Village in Turkey

Terken
- Village
- Country: Turkey
- Province: Çorum
- District: Mecitözü
- Population (2022): 88
- Time zone: UTC+3 (TRT)

Terken is a village in the Mecitözü District of Çorum Province in Turkey. Its population is 88 (2022).
