= Sarayözü, Gümüşhacıköy =

- Village
- Location within Turkey
- Coordinates: 40.9138°N 35.2720°E
- Country: Turkey
- Province: Amasya
- District: Gümüşhacıköy
- Time zone: UTC+3 (TRT)

Sarayözü is a village in the Gümüşhacıköy District, Amasya Province, Turkey. Its population is 161 (2021).
