= Yeniköy, Gümüşhacıköy =

Yeniköy
- Village
- Location within Turkey
- Coordinates: 40°47′57″N 35°09′33″E
- Country: Turkey
- Province: Amasya
- District: Gümüşhacıköy
- Population (2021): 131
- Time zone: UTC+3 (TRT)

Yeniköy is a village in the Gümüşhacıköy District, Amasya Province, Turkey. Its population is 131 (2021). In 2008 it passed from the Hamamözü District to the Gümüşhacıköy District.
