= Konuktepe, Gümüşhacıköy =

Konuktepe
- Village
- Location within Turkey
- Coordinates: 40°55′59″N 35°08′40″E
- Country: Turkey
- Province: Amasya
- District: Gümüşhacıköy
- Population (2022): 84
- Time zone: UTC+3 (TRT)

Konuktepe is a village in the Gümüşhacıköy District, Amasya Province, Turkey. Its population was 84 in 2022. The village was mentioned as Siyah in 1928.

== Demographics ==
Historical population
Year	Pop.	±% p.a.
1985	295	—
1990	294	−0.07%
1997	192	−5.91%
2007	101	−6.22%
2012	95	−1.22%
2017	90	−1.08%
2022	84	−1.37%
Source: Population censuses (1985-1997) and TÜIK (2007-2022)
