= Kuzalan, Gümüşhacıköy =

Kuzalan
- Village
- Location within Turkey
- Coordinates: 40.9172°N 35.1336°E
- Country: Turkey
- Province: Amasya
- District: Gümüşhacıköy
- Population (2021): 226
- Time zone: UTC+3 (TRT)

Kuzalan is a village in the Gümüşhacıköy District, Amasya Province, Turkey. Its population is 226 (2021).
