= Sorkoğlan, Mecitözü =

Village in Turkey

Sorkoğlan
- Village
- Location in Turkey
- Coordinates: 40°27′N 35°08′E
- Country: Turkey
- Province: Çorum
- District: Mecitözü
- Population (2022): 83
- Time zone: UTC+3 (TRT)

Sorkoğlan (also: Sorkoğlanı) is a village in the Mecitözü District of Çorum Province in Turkey. Its population is 83 (2022).
