= Boyacı, Mecitözü =

Village in Turkey

Boyacı
- Village
- Location in Turkey
- Coordinates: 40.4502°N 35.3025°E
- Country: Turkey
- Province: Çorum
- District: Mecitözü
- Population (2022): 209
- Time zone: UTC+3 (TRT)

Boyacı is a village in the Mecitözü District of Çorum Province in Turkey. Its population is 209 (2022).
