= Bademli, Gümüşhacıköy =

Bademli
- Village
- Location within Turkey
- Coordinates: 41.0073°N 35.0764°E
- Country: Turkey
- Province: Amasya
- District: Gümüşhacıköy
- Population (2021): 219
- Time zone: UTC+3 (TRT)

Bademli is a village in the Gümüşhacıköy District, Amasya Province, Turkey. Its population is 219 (2021).
