= Boğazkaya, Mecitözü =

Village in Turkey

Boğazkaya
- Village
- Location in Turkey
- Coordinates: 40.5667°N 35.4511°E
- Country: Turkey
- Province: Çorum
- District: Mecitözü
- Population (2022): 102
- Time zone: UTC+3 (TRT)

Boğazkaya is a village in the Mecitözü District of Çorum Province in Turkey. Its population is 102 (2022).
