= Kızılca, Gümüşhacıköy =

Kızılca
- Village
- Location within Turkey
- Coordinates: 41.0086°N 35.1110°E
- Country: Turkey
- Province: Amasya
- District: Gümüşhacıköy
- Population (2021): 168
- Time zone: UTC+3 (TRT)

Kızılca is a village in the Gümüşhacıköy District, Amasya Province, Turkey. Its population is 168 (2021).
