= Kutluca, Gümüşhacıköy =

Kutluca
- Village
- Location within Turkey
- Coordinates: 41.0189°N 35.0978°E
- Country: Turkey
- Province: Amasya
- District: Gümüşhacıköy
- Population (2021): 180
- Time zone: UTC+3 (TRT)

Kutluca is a village in the Gümüşhacıköy District, Amasya Province, Turkey. Its population is 180 (2021).
