= Eslemez, Gümüşhacıköy =

Eslemez
- Village
- Location within Turkey
- Coordinates: 40°51′N 35°16′E
- Country: Turkey
- Province: Amasya
- District: Gümüşhacıköy
- Population (2021): 96
- Time zone: UTC+3 (TRT)

Eslemez is a village in the Gümüşhacıköy District, Amasya Province, Turkey. Its population is 96 (2021).
