= Kiziroğlu, Gümüşhacıköy =

Kiziroğlu
- Village
- Location within Turkey
- Coordinates: 40.8929°N 35.3012°E
- Country: Turkey
- Province: Amasya
- District: Gümüşhacıköy
- Population (2021): 176
- Time zone: UTC+3 (TRT)

Kiziroğlu is a village in the Gümüşhacıköy District, Amasya Province, Turkey. Its population is 176 (2021).
