= Güplüce =

- Village
- Location within Turkey
- Coordinates: 40°50′38″N 35°17′25″E
- Country: Turkey
- Province: Amasya
- District: Gümüşhacıköy
- Population (2021): 205
- Time zone: UTC+3 (TRT)

Güplüce is a village in the Gümüşhacıköy District, Amasya Province, Turkey. Its population is 205 (2021).
