= Balıklı, Gümüşhacıköy =

Balıklı
- Village
- Location within Turkey
- Coordinates: 40.9194°N 35.2214°E
- Country: Turkey
- Province: Amasya
- District: Gümüşhacıköy
- Population (2021): 58
- Time zone: UTC+3 (TRT)

Balıklı is a village in the Gümüşhacıköy District, Amasya Province, Turkey. Its population is 58 (2021).
