= Kızık, Gümüşhacıköy =

Kızık
- Village
- Location within Turkey
- Coordinates: 41.0308°N 35.1147°E
- Country: Turkey
- Province: Amasya
- District: Gümüşhacıköy
- Population (2021): 82
- Time zone: UTC+3 (TRT)

Kızık is a village in the Gümüşhacıköy District, Amasya Province, Turkey. Its population is 82 (2021).
