= Mecitözü District =

District of Çorum Province, Turkey

- District
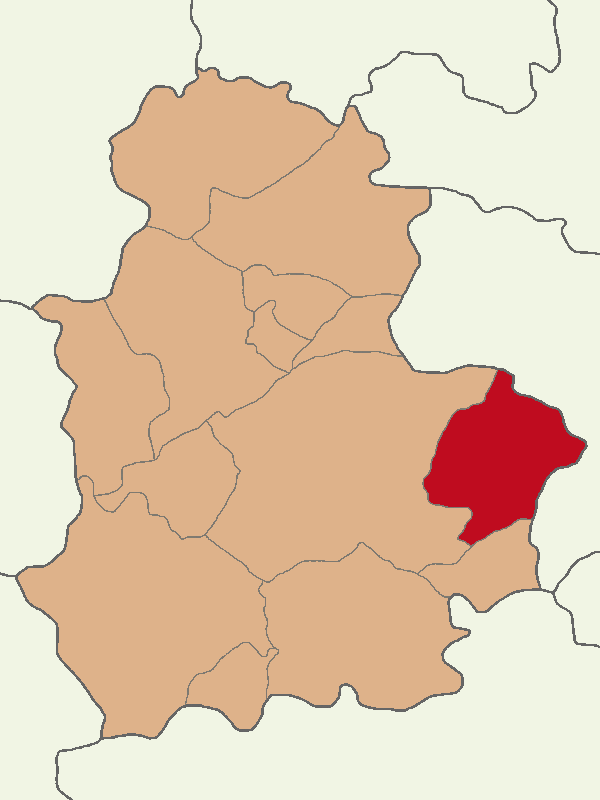
- Map showing Mecitözü District in Çorum Province

- Location in Turkey
- Coordinates: 40°31′N 35°18′E
- Country: Turkey
- Province: Çorum
- Seat: Mecitözü

Government
  - Kaymakam: Mustafa Atış
- Area: 825 km^{2} (319 sq mi)
- Population (2022): 13,840
  - Density: 17/km^{2} (43/sq mi)
- Time zone: UTC+3 (TRT)
- Website: www.mecitozu.gov.tr

Mecitözü District is a district of the Çorum Province of Turkey. Its seat is the town of Mecitözü. Its area is 825 km^{2}, and its population is 13,840 (2022).

== Composition ==
There is one municipality in Mecitözü District:

- Mecitözü

There are 54 villages in Mecitözü District:

- Ağcakoyun
- Akpınar
- Alancık
- Alören
- Aşağı Körücek
- Bayındır
- Bekişler
- Beyözü
- Boğazkaya
- Boyacı
- Bükse
- Çayköy
- Çitli
- Dağsaray
- Devletoğlanı
- Doğla
- Elmapınar
- Elvançelebi
- Emirbağı
- Fakıahmet
- Figani
- Fındıklı
- Geykoca
- Gökçebel
- Güngörmez
- Hisarkavak
- İbek
- Işıklı
- Kalecik
- Karacaören
- Karacuma
- Kargı
- Kayı
- Kışlacık
- Konaç
- Köprübaşı
- Körücek
- Köseeyüp
- Koyunağılı
- Kozören
- Kuyucak
- Pınarbaşı
- Sarıhasan
- Sırçalı
- Söğütönü
- Söğütyolu
- Sorkoğlan
- Sülüklü
- Tanrıvermiş
- Terken
- Totali
- Vakıflar
- Yedigöz
- Yeşilova
