= Kağnıcı, Gümüşhacıköy =

Kağnıcı
- Village
- Location within Turkey
- Coordinates: 41°01′N 35°09′E
- Country: Turkey
- Province: Amasya
- District: Gümüşhacıköy
- Population (2021): 394
- Time zone: UTC+3 (TRT)

Kağnıcı is a village in the Gümüşhacıköy District, Amasya Province, Turkey. Its population is 394 (2021).
