= Beden, Gümüşhacıköy =

Beden
- Village
- Location within Turkey
- Coordinates: 40.9392°N 35.1834°E
- Country: Turkey
- Province: Amasya
- District: Gümüşhacıköy
- Population (2021): 140
- Time zone: UTC+3 (TRT)
- Postal code: 05700
- Area code: 0358

Beden is a village in the Gümüşhacıköy District, Amasya Province, Turkey. Its population is 140 (2021).
