= Dağsaray, Mecitözü =

Village in Turkey

Dağsaray
- Village
- Location in Turkey
- Coordinates: 40°32′N 35°30′E
- Country: Turkey
- Province: Çorum
- District: Mecitözü
- Population (2023): 198
- Time zone: UTC+3 (TRT)

Dağsaray is a village in the Mecitözü District of Çorum Province in Turkey. Its population is 198 (2023).

== Population ==
Historical population
Year	Pop.	±% p.a.
1985	710	—
1990	550	−4.98%
1997	412	−4.04%
2007	284	−3.65%
2012	256	−2.05%
2017	214	−3.52%
2023	198	−1.29%
Source: Population censuses (1985-1997) and TÜİK (2007-2023)
