= Geykoca, Mecitözü =

Village in Turkey

Geykoca
- Village
- Location in Turkey
- Coordinates: 40°30′N 35°18′E
- Country: Turkey
- Province: Çorum
- District: Mecitözü
- Population (2022): 152
- Time zone: UTC+3 (TRT)

Geykoca is a village in the Mecitözü District of Çorum Province in Turkey. Its population is 152 (2022).
