= Karacuma, Mecitözü =

Village in Turkey

Karacuma
- Village
- Location in Turkey
- Coordinates: 40°27′N 35°19′E
- Country: Turkey
- Province: Çorum
- District: Mecitözü
- Population (2022): 135
- Time zone: UTC+3 (TRT)

Karacuma is a village in the Mecitözü District of Çorum Province in Turkey. Its population is 135 (2022). The village is populated by Kurds.
