= Hisarkavak, Mecitözü =

Village in Turkey

Hisarkavak
- Village
- Location in Turkey
- Coordinates: 40°29′N 35°20′E
- Country: Turkey
- Province: Çorum
- District: Mecitözü
- Population (2022): 597
- Time zone: UTC+3 (TRT)

Hisarkavak is a village in the Mecitözü District of Çorum Province in Turkey. Its population is 597 (2022).
