= Çavuşköy, Gümüşhacıköy =

Çavuşköy
- Village
- Location within Turkey
- Coordinates: 40.8314°N 35.2985°E
- Country: Turkey
- Province: Amasya
- District: Gümüşhacıköy
- Population (2021): 60
- Time zone: UTC+3 (TRT)

Çavuşköy is a village in the Gümüşhacıköy District, Amasya Province, Turkey. Its population is 60 (2021).
