= Kılıçaslan, Gümüşhacıköy =

Kılıçaslan
- Village
- Location within Turkey
- Coordinates: 40.8693°N 35.1717°E
- Country: Turkey
- Province: Amasya
- District: Gümüşhacıköy
- Population (2021): 39
- Time zone: UTC+3 (TRT)

Kılıçaslan is a village in the Gümüşhacıköy District, Amasya Province, Turkey. Its population is 39 (2021).
