= Karacaören, Gümüşhacıköy =

Karacaören
- Village
- Location within Turkey
- Coordinates: 40.8755°N 35.3103°E
- Country: Turkey
- Province: Amasya
- District: Gümüşhacıköy
- Population (2021): 309
- Time zone: UTC+3 (TRT)

Karacaören is a village in the Gümüşhacıköy District, Amasya Province, Turkey. Its population is 309 (2021).
