= Köseler, Gümüşhacıköy =

Köseler
- Village
- Location within Turkey
- Country: Turkey
- Province: Amasya
- District: Gümüşhacıköy
- Population (2021): 295
- Time zone: UTC+3 (TRT)

Köseler is a village in the Gümüşhacıköy District, Amasya Province, Turkey. Its population is 295 (2021).
