= Sallar, Gümüşhacıköy =

Sallar
- Village
- Location within Turkey
- Coordinates: 40.9065°N 35.1486°E
- Country: Turkey
- Province: Amasya
- District: Gümüşhacıköy
- Population (2021): 177
- Time zone: UTC+3 (TRT)

Sallar is a village in the Gümüşhacıköy District, Amasya Province, Turkey. Its population is 177 (2021).
