= Elmapınar, Mecitözü =

Village in Turkey

Elmapınar
- Village
- Location in Turkey
- Coordinates: 40.5630°N 35.2383°E
- Country: Turkey
- Province: Çorum
- District: Mecitözü
- Population (2022): 223
- Time zone: UTC+3 (TRT)

Elmapınar is a village in the Mecitözü District of Çorum Province in Turkey. Its population is 223 (2022).
