= Çayköy, Mecitözü =

Village in Turkey

Çayköy
- Village
- Location in Turkey
- Coordinates: 40°24′4″N 35°18′41″E
- Country: Turkey
- Province: Çorum
- District: Mecitözü
- Population (2022): 187
- Time zone: UTC+3 (TRT)

Çayköy is a village in the Mecitözü District of Çorum Province in Turkey. Its population is 187 (2022).
