= Doğla, Mecitözü =

Village in Turkey

Doğla
- Village
- Location in Turkey
- Coordinates: 40.385°N 35.292°E
- Country: Turkey
- Province: Çorum
- District: Mecitözü
- Population (2022): 371
- Time zone: UTC+3 (TRT)

Doğla is a village in the Mecitözü District of Çorum Province in Turkey. Its population is 371 (2022).
