= Çetmi, Gümüşhacıköy =

Çetmi
- Village
- Location within Turkey
- Coordinates: 40.8279°N 35.2188°E
- Country: Turkey
- Province: Amasya
- District: Gümüşhacıköy
- Population (2021): 491
- Time zone: UTC+3 (TRT)

Çetmi is a village in the Gümüşhacıköy District, Amasya Province, Turkey. Its population is 491 (2021).
