= Figani, Mecitözü =

Village in Turkey

Figani
- Village
- Location in Turkey
- Coordinates: 40°35′N 35°25′E
- Country: Turkey
- Province: Çorum
- District: Mecitözü
- Population (2022): 442
- Time zone: UTC+3 (TRT)

Figani is a village in the Mecitözü District of Çorum Province in Turkey. Its population is 442 (2022).
