= Kırca, Gümüşhacıköy =

Kırca
- Village
- Location within Turkey
- Coordinates: 40.9394°N 35.1603°E
- Country: Turkey
- Province: Amasya
- District: Gümüşhacıköy
- Population (2021): 231
- Time zone: UTC+3 (TRT)

Kırca is a village in the Gümüşhacıköy District, Amasya Province, Turkey. Its population is 231 (2021).
