= Söğütyolu, Mecitözü =

Village in Turkey

Söğütyolu
- Village
- Location in Turkey
- Coordinates: 40°30′17″N 35°10′35″E
- Country: Turkey
- Province: Çorum
- District: Mecitözü
- Population (2022): 116
- Time zone: UTC+3 (TRT)

Söğütyolu is a village in the Mecitözü District of Çorum Province in Turkey. Its population is 116 (2022).
