= Alancık, Mecitözü =

Village in Turkey

Alancık
- Village
- Location in Turkey
- Coordinates: 40.5047°N 35.4430°E
- Country: Turkey
- Province: Çorum
- District: Mecitözü
- Population (2022): 224
- Time zone: UTC+3 (TRT)

Alancık is a village in the Mecitözü District of Çorum Province in Turkey. Its population is 224 (2022).
