= Korkut, Gümüşhacıköy =

Korkut
- Village
- Location within Turkey
- Coordinates: 40.8052°N 35.1847°E
- Country: Turkey
- Province: Amasya
- District: Gümüşhacıköy
- Population (2021): 321
- Time zone: UTC+3 (TRT)

Korkut is a village in the Gümüşhacıköy District, Amasya Province, Turkey. Its population is 321 (2021).
