= Devletoğlanı, Mecitözü =

Village in Turkey

Devletoğlanı
- Village
- Location in Turkey
- Coordinates: 40°28′N 35°10′E
- Country: Turkey
- Province: Çorum
- District: Mecitözü
- Population (2022): 133
- Time zone: UTC+3 (TRT)

Devletoğlanı is a village in the Mecitözü District of Çorum Province in Turkey. Its population is 133 (2022).
