= Gümüşhacıköy District =

District of Amasya Province, Turkey

- District
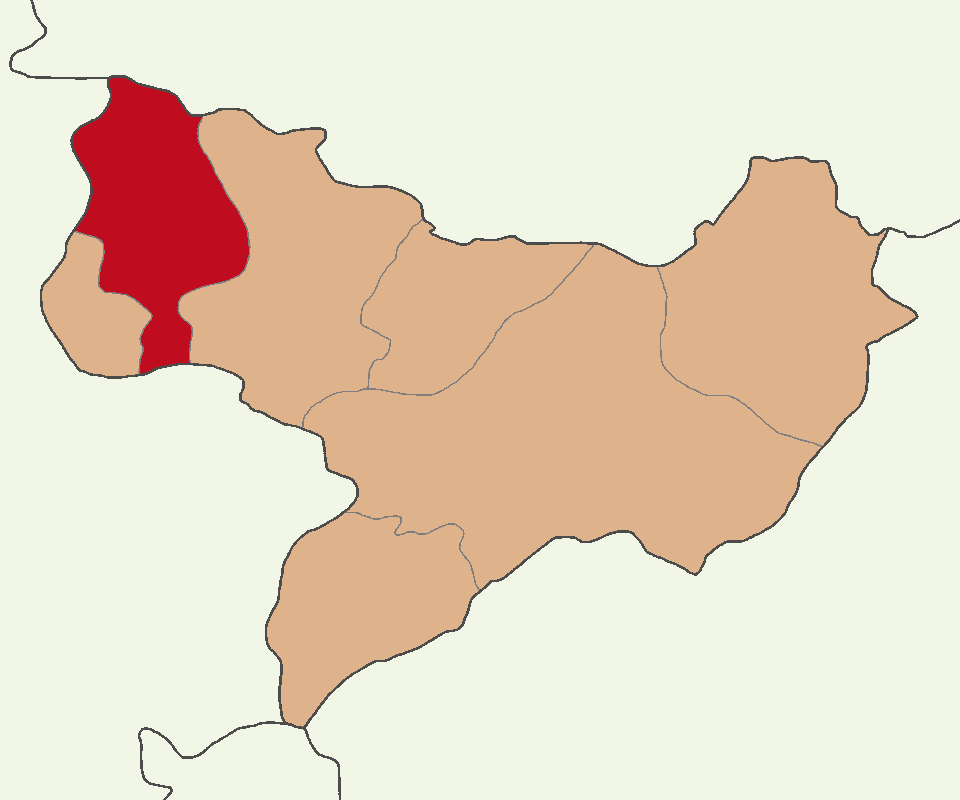
- Map showing Gümüşhacıköy District in Amasya Province

- Location in Turkey
- Coordinates: 40°52′N 35°13′E
- Country: Turkey
- Province: Amasya
- Seat: Gümüşhacıköy

Government
  - Kaymakam: Ali Cemal Altınöz
- Area: 629 km^{2} (243 sq mi)
- Population (2021): 22,179
  - Density: 35/km^{2} (91/sq mi)
- Time zone: UTC+3 (TRT)
- Website: www.gumushacikoy.gov.tr

Gümüşhacıköy District is a district of Amasya Province of Turkey. Its seat is the town Gümüşhacıköy. Its area is 629 km^{2}, and its population is 22,179 (2021).

== Composition ==
There is one municipality in Gümüşhacıköy District:

- Gümüşhacıköy

There are 44 villages in Gümüşhacıköy District:

- Akpınar
- Alören
- Aşağıovacık
- Bacakoğlu
- Bademli
- Balıklı
- Beden
- Çalköy
- Çavuşköy
- Çetmi
- Çiftçioğlu
- Çitli
- Derbentobruğu
- Doluca
- Dumanlı
- Eslemez
- Güllüce
- Güplüce
- Güvemözü
- İmirler
- Kağnıcı
- Karaali
- Karacaören
- Karakaya
- Keçiköy
- Kılıçaslan
- Kırca
- Kızık
- Kızılca
- Kiziroğlu
- Koltuk
- Konuktepe
- Korkut
- Köseler
- Kutluca
- Kuzalan
- Ovabaşı
- Pusacak
- Sallar
- Saraycık
- Sarayözü
- Sekü
- Yazıyeri
- Yeniköy
