= Doluca, Gümüşhacıköy =

Doluca
- Village
- Location within Turkey
- Coordinates: 40.8332°N 35.3271°E
- Country: Turkey
- Province: Amasya
- District: Gümüşhacıköy
- Population (2021): 199
- Time zone: UTC+3 (TRT)

Doluca is a village in the Gümüşhacıköy District, Amasya Province, Turkey. Its population is 199 (2021).
