= Çiftçioğlu, Gümüşhacıköy =

Çiftçioğlu
- Village
- Location within Turkey
- Coordinates: 40°53′N 35°19′E
- Country: Turkey
- Province: Amasya
- District: Gümüşhacıköy
- Population (2021): 106
- Time zone: UTC+3 (TRT)

Çiftçioğlu is a village in the Gümüşhacıköy District, Amasya Province, Turkey. Its population is 106 (2021).
