= Ağcakoyun, Mecitözü =

Village in Turkey

Ağcakoyun
- Village
- Location in Turkey
- Coordinates: 40°31′N 35°12′E
- Country: Turkey
- Province: Çorum
- District: Mecitözü
- Population (2022): 76
- Time zone: UTC+3 (TRT)

Ağcakoyun is a village in the Mecitözü District of Çorum Province in Turkey. Its population is 76 (2022).
