= Koltuk, Gümüşhacıköy =

Koltuk
- Village
- Location within Turkey
- Coordinates: 40.9145°N 35.2363°E
- Country: Turkey
- Province: Amasya
- District: Gümüşhacıköy
- Population (2021): 108
- Time zone: UTC+3 (TRT)

Koltuk is a village in the Gümüşhacıköy District, Amasya Province, Turkey. Its population is 108 (2021).
