= Bayındır, Mecitözü =

Village in Turkey

Bayındır
- Village
- Location in Turkey
- Coordinates: 40.5142°N 35.3593°E
- Country: Turkey
- Province: Çorum
- District: Mecitözü
- Population (2022): 238
- Time zone: UTC+3 (TRT)

Bayındır is a village in the Mecitözü District of Çorum Province in Turkey. Its population is 238 (2022).
