= Keçiköy, Gümüşhacıköy =

Keçiköy
- Village
- Location within Turkey
- Coordinates: 40.8218°N 35.2574°E
- Country: Turkey
- Province: Amasya
- District: Gümüşhacıköy
- Population (2021): 373
- Time zone: UTC+3 (TRT)

Keçiköy (also: Keçi) is a village in the Gümüşhacıköy District, Amasya Province, Turkey. Its population is 373 (2021).
