= Elvançelebi, Mecitözü =

Village in Turkey

Elvançelebi
- Village
- Location in Turkey
- Coordinates: 40°34′N 35°10′E
- Country: Turkey
- Province: Çorum
- District: Mecitözü
- Population (2022): 322
- Time zone: UTC+3 (TRT)

Elvançelebi is a village in the Mecitözü District of Çorum Province in Turkey. Its population is 322 (2022). Before the 2013 reorganisation, it was a town (belde).
