= Tanrıvermiş, Mecitözü =

Village in Turkey

Tanrıvermiş
- Village
- Location in Turkey
- Coordinates: 40°38′N 35°16′E
- Country: Turkey
- Province: Çorum
- District: Mecitözü
- Population (2022): 461
- Time zone: UTC+3 (TRT)

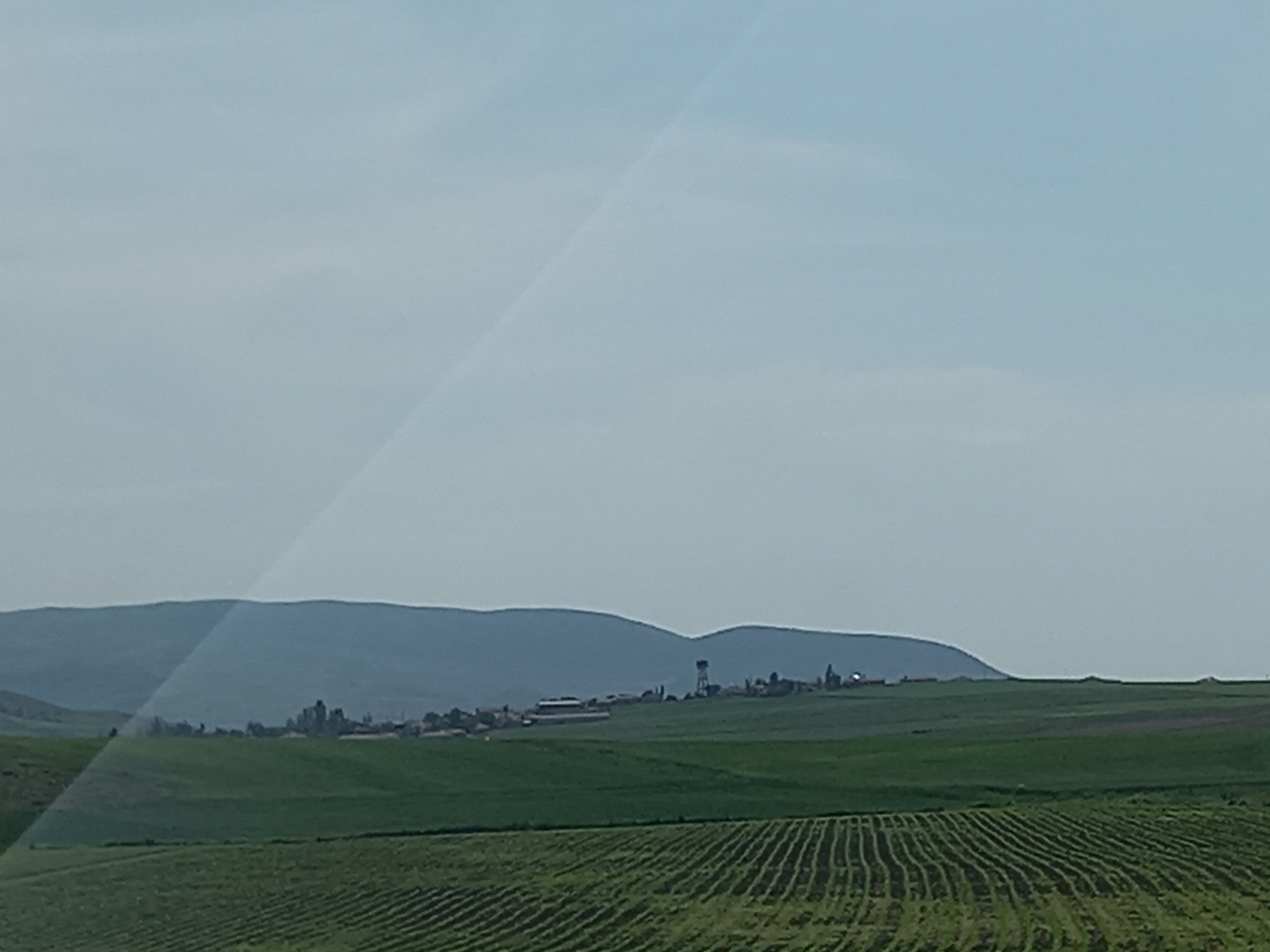
Tanrıvermiş, Mecitözü

Tanrıvermiş is a village in the Mecitözü District of Çorum Province in Turkey. Its population is 461 (2022).
