= Aşağıovacık, Gümüşhacıköy =

Aşağıovacık
- Village
- Location within Turkey
- Coordinates: 40.8080°N 35.1033°E
- Country: Turkey
- Province: Amasya
- District: Gümüşhacıköy
- Population (2021): 127
- Time zone: UTC+3 (TRT)

Aşağıovacık is a village in the Gümüşhacıköy District, Amasya Province, Turkey. Its population is 127 (2021). In 2008 it passed from the Hamamözü District to the Gümüşhacıköy District.
