= Çitli, Gümüşhacıköy =

Çitli
- Village
- Location within Turkey
- Coordinates: 40.7714°N 35.2177°E
- Country: Turkey
- Province: Amasya
- District: Gümüşhacıköy
- Population (2021): 168
- Time zone: UTC+3 (TRT)

Çitli is a village in the Gümüşhacıköy District, Amasya Province, Turkey. Its population is 168 (2021).
