= Mecitözü =

- Municipality
- Location within Turkey
- Coordinates: 40°31′12″N 35°17′43″E
- Country: Turkey
- Province: Çorum
- District: Mecitözü

Government
  - Mayor: Veli Aylar (CHP)
- Population (2022): 4,036
- Time zone: UTC+3 (TRT)
- Area code: 0364
- Climate: Csb
- Website: www.mecitozu.bel.tr

Mecitözü is a town in Çorum Province in the Black Sea region of Turkey, 37 km from the city of Çorum. It is the seat of Mecitözü District. Its population is 4,036 (2022). The mayor is Veli Aylar (CHP).

Mecitözü is situated on a small plain encircled by mountains, with an average annual rainfall of 422.7 mm. The local economy relies heavily on farming, particularly the cultivation of sugar beets and grains. The town also hosts a flour mill and a brickworks. Mecitözü offers essential services to the surrounding district, including schools, sports facilities, a hospital, and other basic infrastructure. Additionally, there are three health centers located in the countryside.

Excavations in the villages of Kuşsaray and Elvançelebi indicate habitation since 5000 BCE.
