= Alören, Mecitözü =

Village in Turkey

Alören
- Village
- Location in Turkey
- Coordinates: 40.5670°N 35.2182°E
- Country: Turkey
- Province: Çorum
- District: Mecitözü
- Population (2022): 136
- Time zone: UTC+3 (TRT)

Alören is a village in the Mecitözü District of Çorum Province in Turkey. Its population is 136 (2022).
