= Güllüce, Gümüşhacıköy =

Güllüce
- Village
- Location within Turkey
- Country: Turkey
- Province: Amasya
- District: Gümüşhacıköy
- Population (2021): 30
- Time zone: UTC+3 (TRT)

Güllüce is a village in the Gümüşhacıköy District, Amasya Province, Turkey. Its population is 30 (2021).
