= Gümüşhacıköy =

- Municipality
- Location within Turkey
- Coordinates: 40°52′N 35°13′E
- Country: Turkey
- Province: Amasya
- District: Gümüşhacıköy

Government
  - Mayor: Zehra Özyol (CHP)
- Population (2021): 14,582
- Time zone: UTC+3 (TRT)
- Website: www.gumushacikoy.bel.tr

Gümüşhacıköy is a town in the westernmost part of Amasya Province of Turkey, 20 km from the larger town of Merzifon. It is the seat of Gümüşhacıköy District. Its population is 14,582 (2021). The mayor is Zehra Özyol (CHP).

The name Gümüşhacıköy is an amalgamation of two separate villages Gümüş (silver) and Hacıköy (the village of pilgrims). Thus the town is still often called Hacıköy.

== Climate ==
Gümüşhacıköy has a warm-summer Mediterranean climate (Köppen: Csb).

Climate data for Gümüşhacıköy
Month	Jan	Feb	Mar	Apr	May	Jun	Jul	Aug	Sep	Oct	Nov	Dec	Year
Daily mean °C (°F)	0.5 (32.9)	2.0 (35.6)	5.3 (41.5)	10.8 (51.4)	14.9 (58.8)	18.2 (64.8)	20.4 (68.7)	20.3 (68.5)	17.2 (63.0)	12.6 (54.7)	7.3 (45.1)	2.7 (36.9)	11.0 (51.8)
Average precipitation mm (inches)	40 (1.6)	32 (1.3)	37 (1.5)	47 (1.9)	61 (2.4)	51 (2.0)	19 (0.7)	14 (0.6)	24 (0.9)	31 (1.2)	36 (1.4)	43 (1.7)	435 (17.2)
Source: Climate-Data.org

== History ==
The town achieved some prosperity during the 13th and 14th centuries due to the nearby silver mines. Both the Seljuks and the Ilkhans minted coins in the town, then known as Gümüşbazar (Arabic: كمشبازار).

The town grew and continued to thrive under Ottoman rule. The population shrank as the Ottoman Empire collapsed, and many men of Gümüşhacıköy were lost in the Balkan Wars and the First World War.

Today Gümüşhacıköy is a small town in attractive countryside. Successive generations migrate to larger cities in search of careers leaving an aging and shrinking population behind.

== Places of interest ==
- The town has had a rich history and the many Seljuk and Ottoman buildings include urban architecture such as Bedestan (the covered bazaar), Büyük Hamam (bathhouse), and Kabak çeşmesi (fountain) and especially.....
- Mosques such as Haliliye Medresesi, Yörgüç Paşa Camii, Darphane Camii, Maden Camii (a converted church).
- There is also an attractive picnic area with a waterfall in the forests near the district of Şarlayuk.
