= Alören, Gümüşhacıköy =

Alören
- Village
- Location within Turkey
- Coordinates: 40.9533°N 35.2035°E
- Country: Turkey
- Province: Amasya
- District: Gümüşhacıköy
- Population (2021): 93
- Time zone: UTC+3 (TRT)

Alören is a village in the Gümüşhacıköy District, Amasya Province, Turkey. Its population is 93 (2021).
