= Ovabaşı, Gümüşhacıköy =

Ovabaşı
- Village
- Location within Turkey
- Coordinates: 40.7495°N 35.2241°E
- Country: Turkey
- Province: Amasya
- District: Gümüşhacıköy
- Population (2021): 282
- Time zone: UTC+3 (TRT)

Ovabaşı is a village in the Gümüşhacıköy District, Amasya Province, Turkey. Its population is 282 (2021).
