= Vakıflar, Mecitözü =

Village in Turkey

Vakıflar
- Village
- Location in Turkey
- Coordinates: 40.4702°N 35.0997°E
- Country: Turkey
- Province: Çorum
- District: Mecitözü
- Population (2022): 53
- Time zone: UTC+3 (TRT)

Vakıflar is a village in the Mecitözü District of Çorum Province in Turkey. Its population is 53 (2022).
