= Nartan =

Nartan (Russian: Нартан) is the name of several rural localities in Chegemsky District of the Kabardino-Balkarian Republic, Russia:

- Nartan (road crossing), a road crossing
- Nartan (selo), a selo
