= Bilsk =

Bilsk may refer to the following villages in Ukraine:

- Bilsk, Poltava Oblast
- Bilsk, Rivne Oblast
