= İmirler, Gümüşhacıköy =

İmirler
- Village
- Location within Turkey
- Coordinates: 40°53′N 35°09′E
- Country: Turkey
- Province: Amasya
- District: Gümüşhacıköy
- Population (2021): 211
- Time zone: UTC+3 (TRT)

İmirler is a village in the Gümüşhacıköy District, Amasya Province, Turkey. Its population is 211 (2021).
