= Bozdoğan (disambiguation) =

Bozdoğan usually refers to the district in Aydın Province, Turkey, but may also refer to:

- Bozdoğan (tribe), Turkmen tribe
- Bozdoğan, Alaca, village in Çorum Province, Turkey
- Bozdoğan, Anamur, village in Mersin Province, Turkey
- Bozdoğan, Mut, village in Mersin Province, Turkey
- Bozdoğan, Olur, village in Erzurum Province, Turkey
- Sarakap, formerly known as Bozdogan, village Shirak Province in Armenia
- Valens Aqueduct, Bozdoğan Kemeri, in Istanbul, Turkey

== See also ==
- Bozdoğan (surname)
