= Karaçal =

Karaçal can refer to:

- Karaçal, Alaca
- Karaçal, Burdur
- Karaçal Dam
