= Ünalan =

Ünalan can refer to:

- Ünalan, Alaca
- Ünalan (Istanbul Metro)
