= Sincan =

Sincan may refer to:

- Sincan, Azerbaijan
- Sincan, Ankara, Turkey
- Sincan, Alaca
