= Emirci Sultan =

Babai mystic (died 1240)

Sharaf al-Din Ismail, better known as Emirci Sultan (died 1240), (Note: Also known as Emirce Sultan or Emircem Sultan.) was a mystic involved in the Babai revolt during the 13th century. According to Ottoman historian Gelibolulu Mustafa Ali, Emirci Sultan arrived in Anatolia in the year 1203–4. He settled and formed the zaviye (religious school) in a Christian village near Alaca, converting much of the residents to Islam.

== Bibliography ==
- Ocak, Ahmet Yaşar (1995). "Emirci Sultan". TDV Encyclopedia of Islam, Vol. 11 (Elbi̇stan – Eymi̇r) (in Turkish). Istanbul: Turkiye Diyanet Foundation, Centre for Islamic Studies. pp. 153–155. ISBN 978-975-389-438-8.
