= Belpınar =

Belpınar can refer to:

- Belpınar, Alaca
- Belpınar, Kızılcahamam
- Belpınar Dam
