= Alaca Höyük =

Ancient Hittite site in northern Turkey

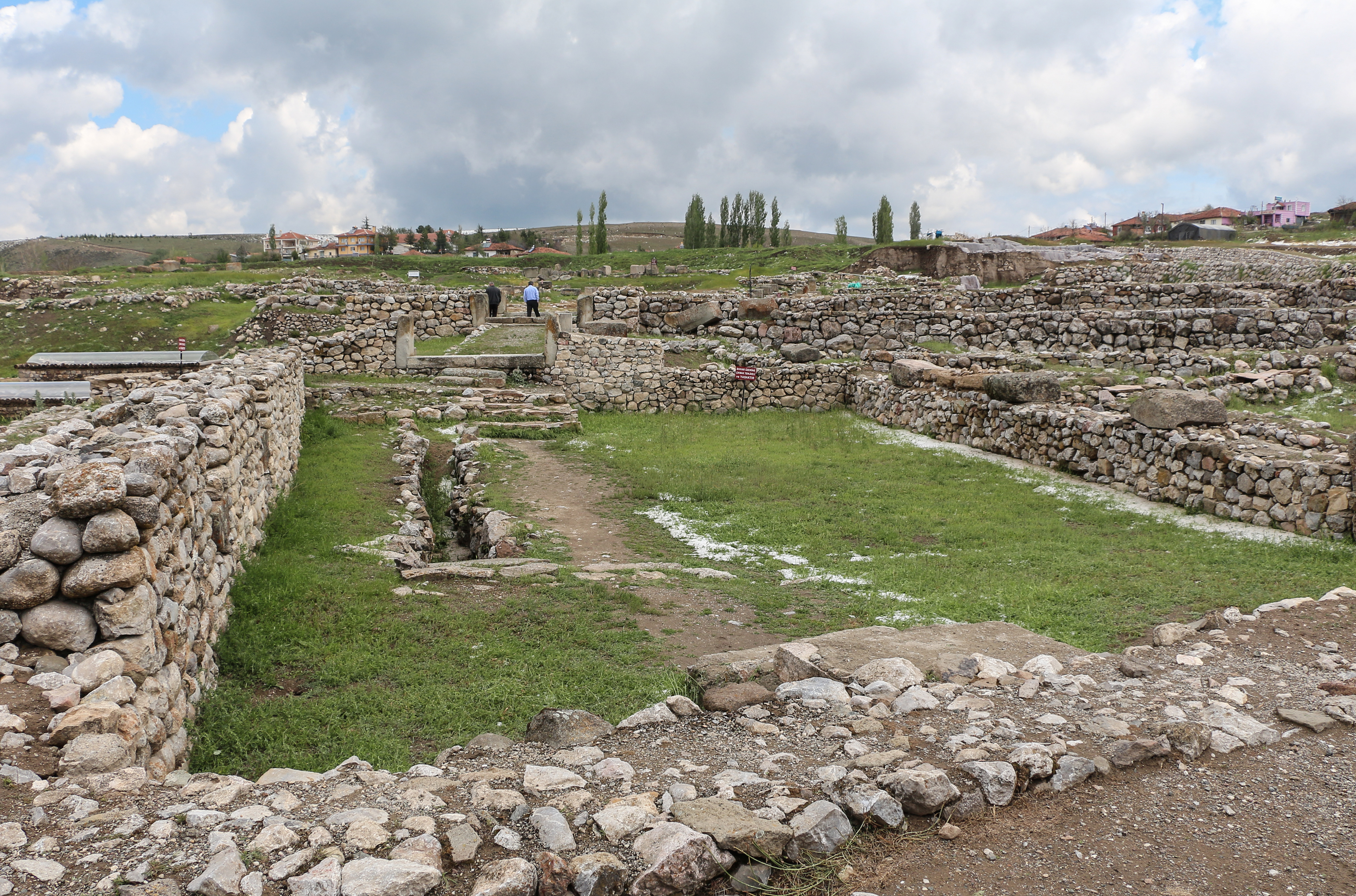
- Alaca Höyük

- Location within Turkey
- 40°14′04″N 34°41′44″E
- Type: Settlement
- Periods: Chalcolithic, Bronze Age
- Cultures: Hittite
- Location: Çorum Province, Turkey
- Region: Anatolia

Site notes
- Excavation dates: 1907, 1910s, 1935–1970
- Archaeologists: Theodor Makridi Bey, Remzi Oğuz Arık, Hamit Zübeyr Koşay
- Condition: In ruins

Alacahöyük or Alaca Höyük (sometimes also spelled as Alacahüyük, Euyuk, or Evuk) is the site of a Neolithic and Hittite settlement and is an important archaeological site. It is situated near the village of Alacahüyük in the Alaca District of Çorum Province, Turkey, northeast of Boğazkale (formerly and more familiarly Boğazköy), where the ancient capital city Hattusa of the Hittite Empire was situated. Its Hittite name is unknown: connections with Arinna, Tawiniya, and Zippalanda have all been suggested.

== History ==
The mound (Turkish höyük) measures 310 meters by 275 meters with a height of about 14 meters. The mound features cone like rises at the south and northeast ends. It has 14 occupational layers with 9-14 being Chalcolithic, 5-8 being Early Bronze Age (royal tombs), and 2-4 being Hittite. The uppermost layer shows elements of Phrygian, Roman, and Ottoman times.

=== Chalcolithic ===
Layers 14-9: Alacahöyük was a scene of settlement in a continuous sequence of development from the Chalcolithic Age, when earliest copper tools appeared alongside the use of stone tools.

=== Early Bronze ===
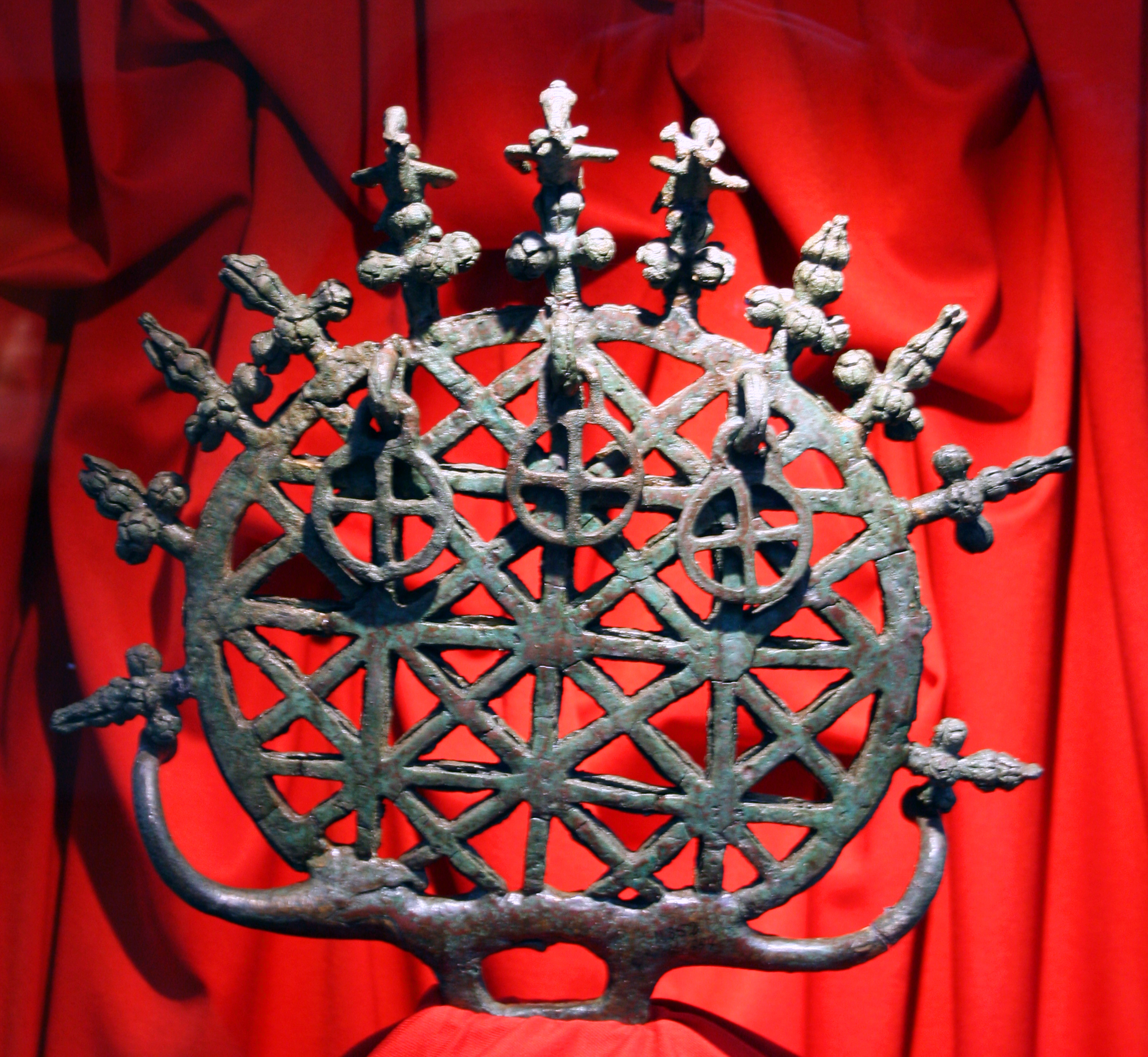
A sun disk found in tombs in Alacahöyük dates back to the early Bronze Age.

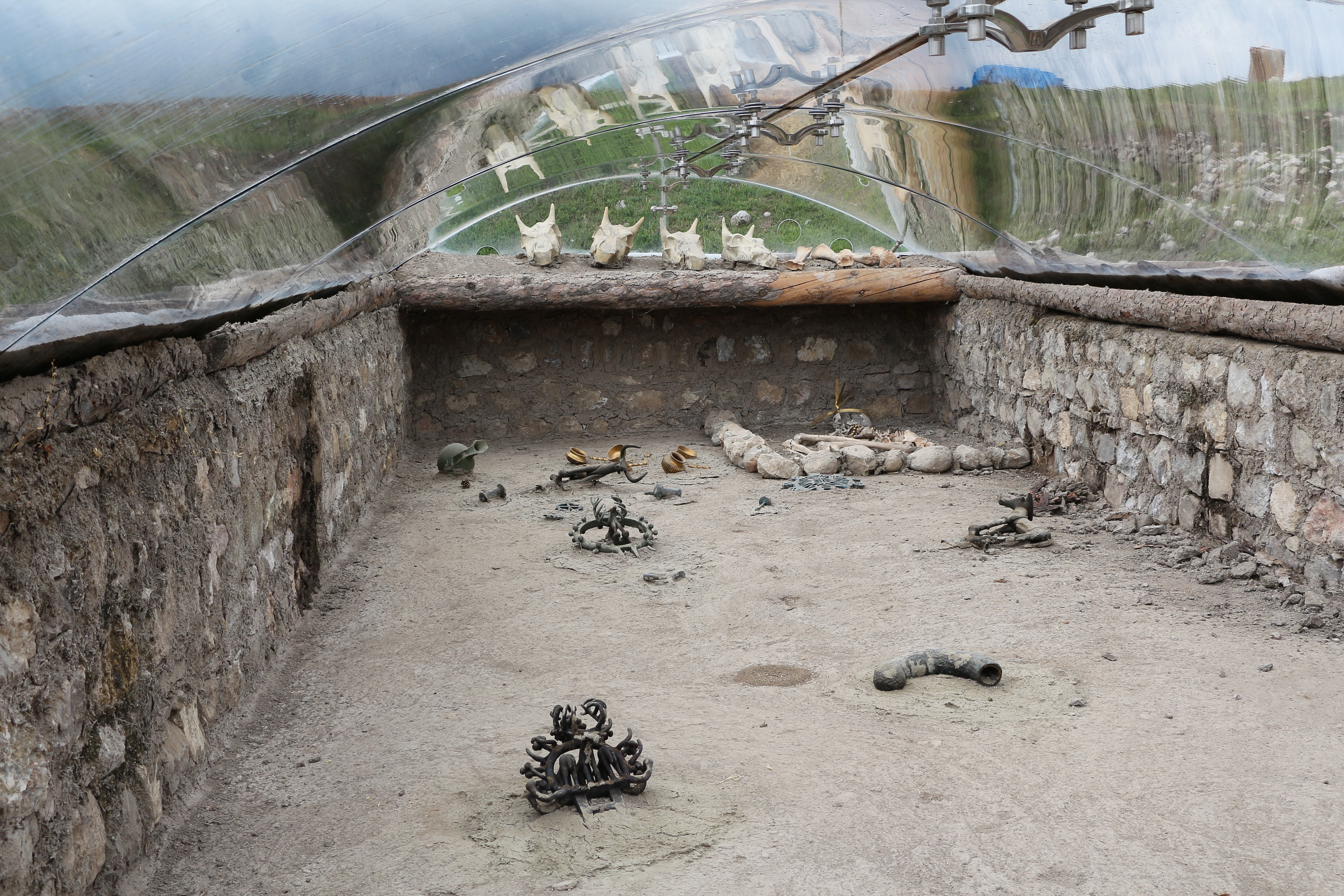
A royal tomb in Alaca Höyük

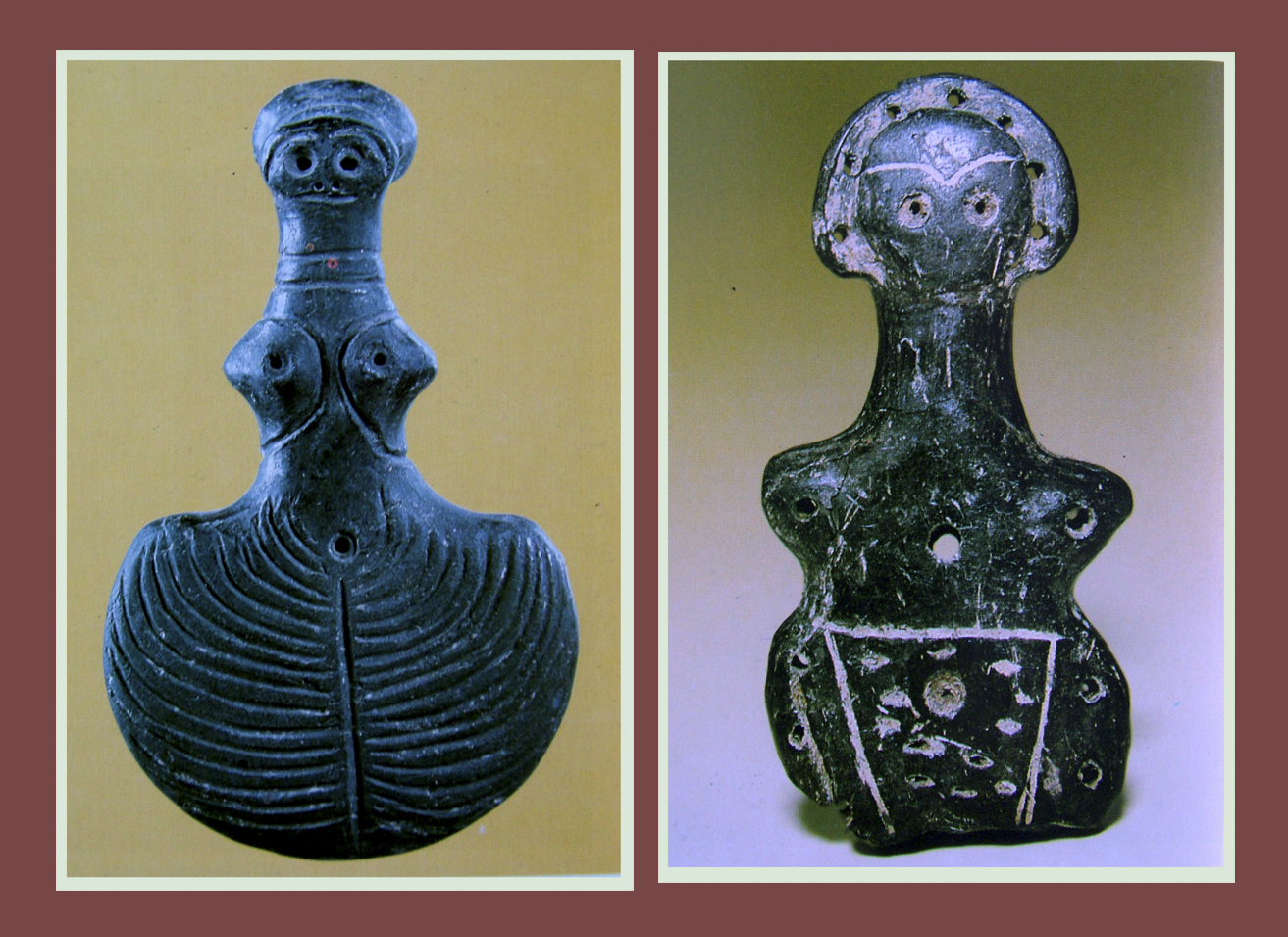
Artifacts from Alaca Höyük

Layers 8-5: During the Early Bronze Age, the mound was the center of a flourishing culture connected to the Anatolian Trade Network. It has been continuously occupied ever since, until today's modern settlement in the form of a small village.

Fourteen shaft-grave "Royal Tombs" (2850–2450 BC) date to the same period as the Royal Tombs of Ur and the Troy excavation level II. The tombs of typical shaft design, about 1.5 meters in depth, sealed by wooden beams, They contained the dead with folded legs facing west. The heads and legs of bulls were placed on platforms and the dead were richly adorned with gold fibulae, diadems, and belt buckles and repoussé gold-leaf figures. Seven metal figurines were found in the tombs with four being made of bronze and 3 of silver.

- Tomb H - (8 meters by 3.4 meters), female. Contents included "a golden diadem, two copper mace heads, a bronze sun standard, the statuette of an animal, small ornaments made of gold and silver, vessels made of gold and clay, metal artefacts, two axes, five pairs of twin idols made of gold, and three female figurines".
- Tombs A - (5 meters by 2.3 meters), adult female. Besides a golden diadem contents included "four sun standards, an animal statuette, several metal ornaments, pieces of an iron object, and two metal anthropomorphic figurines ".

Many of the artefacts discovered at Alacahöyük, including magnificent gold and bronze objects found in the Royal Tombs, are housed today in the Museum of Anatolian Civilizations in Ankara. Among these artefacts are gold and electrum standing cups and other vessels. The most unusual are the Alaca Höyük bronze standards; bulls or stags on pedestals whose purpose remains the subject of debate. The standards are cast in copper, many in the form of flat circles, half-circles or squares that are filled with an openwork network of cross bars, central crosses, and swastikas. Leonard Woolley found that the Royal Tombs "seem to belong to the end of a period, as marked by a stratum of destruction and the burning of the citadel. The culture which the tomb objects illustrate does not continue into the next historical phase, that of Kültepe".

==== Gold-iron dagger ====
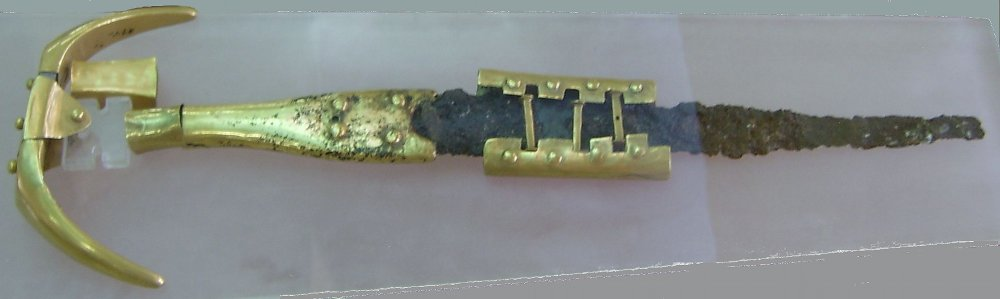
Dagger with iron blade and golden hilt from Alaca Höyük. Early evidence for the use of iron in Anatolia. 2500-2400 BC.

A gold-handled dagger was found at Alacahöyük, and it is now in the collection of the Ankara's Museum of Anatolian Civilizations. It was excavated from grave K (find No. Al.K.14) and may be dated as early as 2500 BC. Japanese scholars have issued a preliminary report about the composition of the dagger in 2008, and they concluded that the dagger was probably made from meteoritic iron.

=== Late Bronze ===
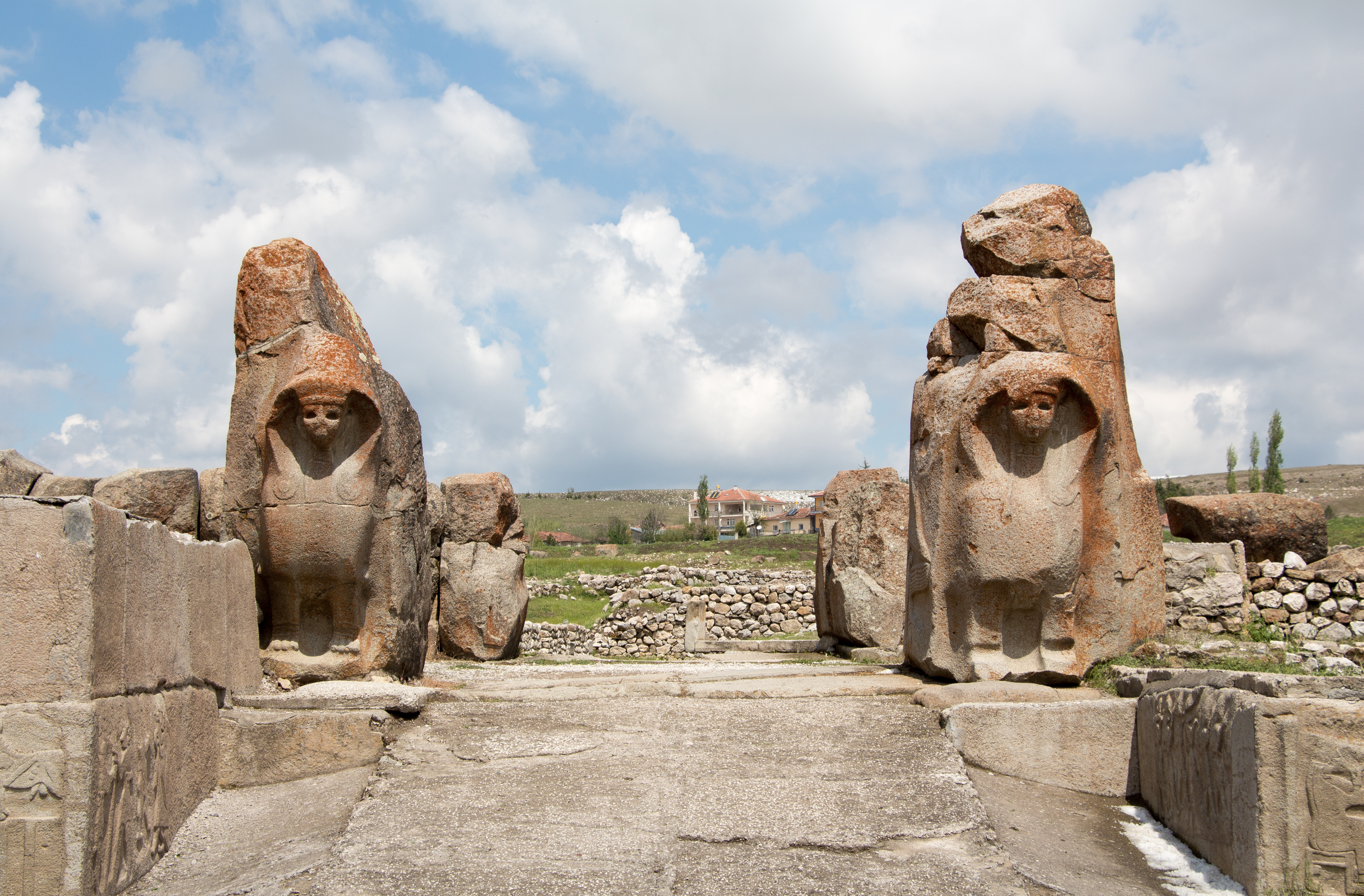
The Sphinx Gate

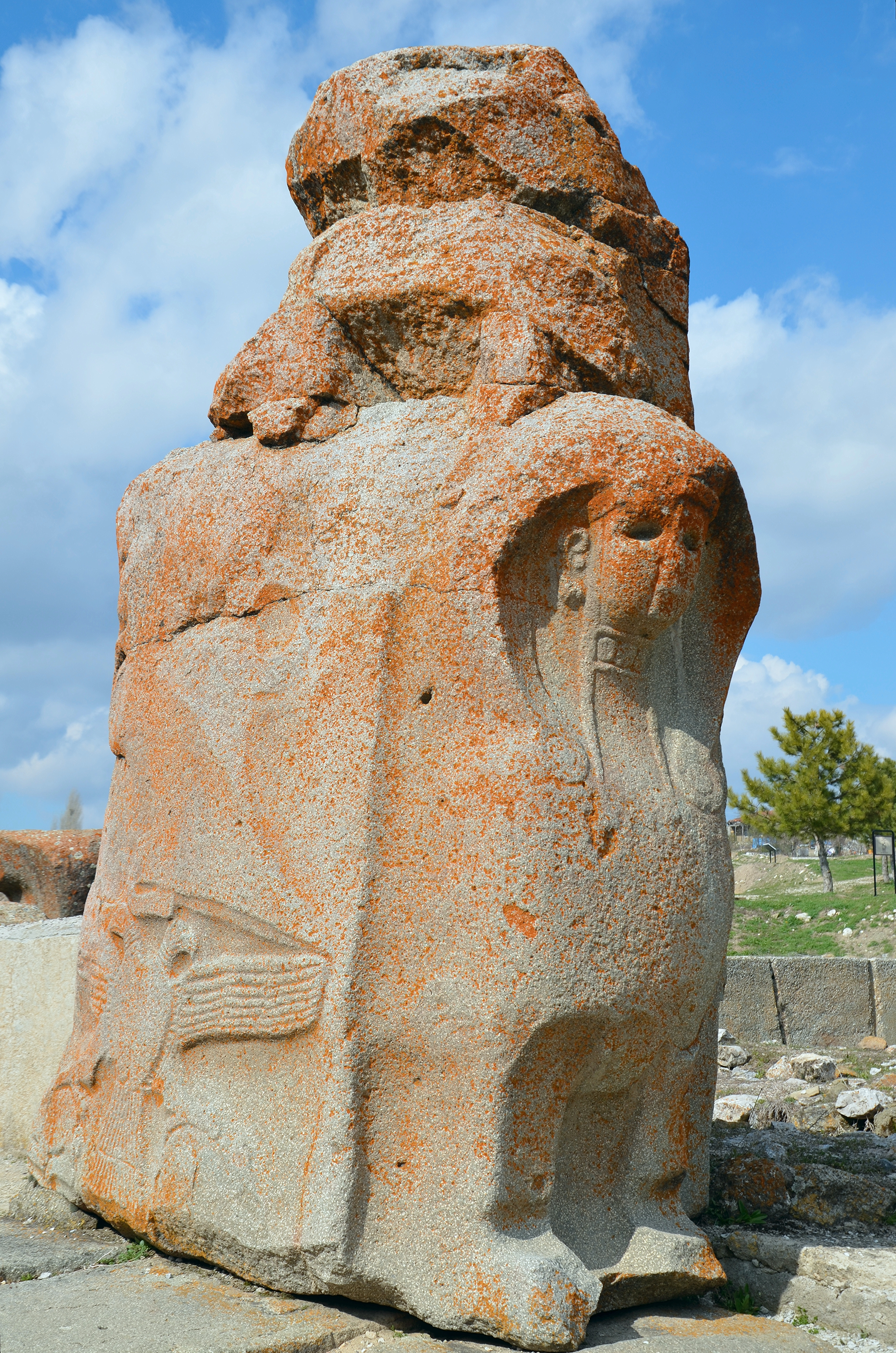
The Sphinx Gate detail

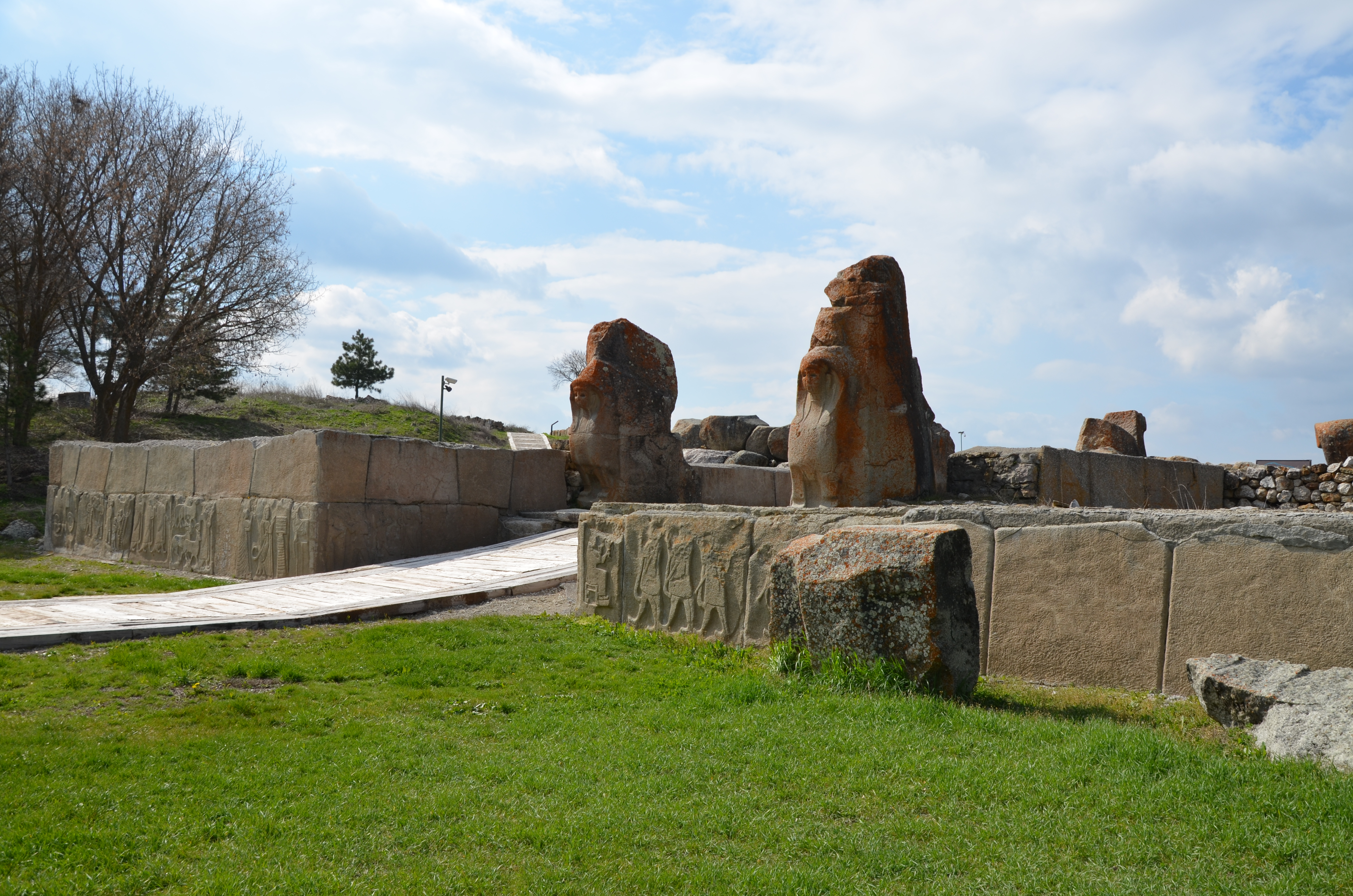
The Sphinx Gate detail

Layers 4-2 Hittite period: The standing and distinguishing remains at Alaca Höyük, however, such as the "Sphinx Gate", date from the Hittite period that followed the Hatti, from the fourteenth century BC.

Two Hittite cuneform texts (A1.d164) mentions the city Arinna and the sun-goddess. One letter states: "Zuwa says: Arinna which was inherited by us from our grandfathers has a golden sun disk which represents the Sun Goddess". The letter may have been sent from or to this site, indicating that the city Arinna can be identified with this site or was nearby.

==== Tudhaliya IV ====
During the reign of king Tudhaliya IV (c. 1245-1215 BC) drought devastated the country leading to the construction of a series of dams throughout the Hittite Empire. The king also imported grain from Egypt to avoid famine. The Gölpınar dam, located 1.5 kilometers to the south of Alaca Höyük, was dedicated to the goddess Hebat. It has been excavated since 2002 and made usable again in 2006 because the water source was located inside the reservoir. In the late 13th century BC, drier climate conditions ultimately led to the Collapse of the Bronze Age.

=== Iron Age ===
Modern assessment finds that the site continued as a flourishing community to the end of the Late Bronze Age. There was also a sizable occupation in Phrygian times.

== Excavations ==
The site was probed by George Perrot and Ernest Chantre in the late 1800s and drawings of the remains published. In 1907, the Ottoman archaeologist Theodor Makridi Bey carried out brief explorations here for two weeks. In the 1910s, German teams discovered royal tombs dating to the third millennium BC, as well as a Hittite town of the second millennium BC. The impressive sphinx gate surrounded by stone reliefs marked its entrance. The town was heavily fortified with walls and towers due to the frequent raids of the Kaska people living in the mountainous region to the north. Excavations by the Turkish archaeologists Remzi Oğuz Arık and Hamit Koşay resumed in 1935 under the personal instructions of Atatürk who contributed from his own budget. In 1968 the work was under the direction of Mahmut A. The work, which continued until 1970, revealed considerable local wealth and achievement even before the time of the Hittites, with the earliest occupation dating from the 4th millennium BC. Tombs of the 3rd millennium BC feature metal vessels, jewelry, weapons, and pole finials of bulls, stags, as well as abstract forms often interpreted as solar symbols. Excavation at the site resumed in 1994, and is now directed by Dr. Aykut Çınaroğlu.

In the excavations of 2002, 2003 and 2005, four new hieroglyphic Luwian documents were uncovered, a clay sealing, two vessels with seal impressions, and a stele fragment.

== See also ==
- Alishar Hüyük
- Cities of the ancient Near East
