= Akçiçek =

Akçiçek can refer to:

- Akçiçek, Alaca
- Akçiçek, Karakoçan
- the Turkish name for Sysklipos
- Yusuf Akçiçek, Turkish footballer
