= Evci =

Evci (Turkish pronunciation: [evdʒi]) may refer to the following places in Turkey:

- Evci, Alaca, Çorum Province
- Evci, Ayaş, Ankara Province
- Evci, Bayat, Çorum Province
- Evci, Boğazkale, Çorum Province
- Evci, Haymana, Ankara Province
- Evci, Tufanbeyli, Adana Province
