= Değirmenönü =

Değirmenönü can refer to:

- Değirmenönü, Alaca
- Değirmenönü, Elâzığ
- Değirmenönü, Kızılcahamam
