= Suludere =

Suludere can refer to:

- Suludere, Alaca
- Suludere, Aydıntepe
- Suludere, Burdur
