= Gölpınar Dam =

Coordinates: 40°13′25″N 34°42′29″E

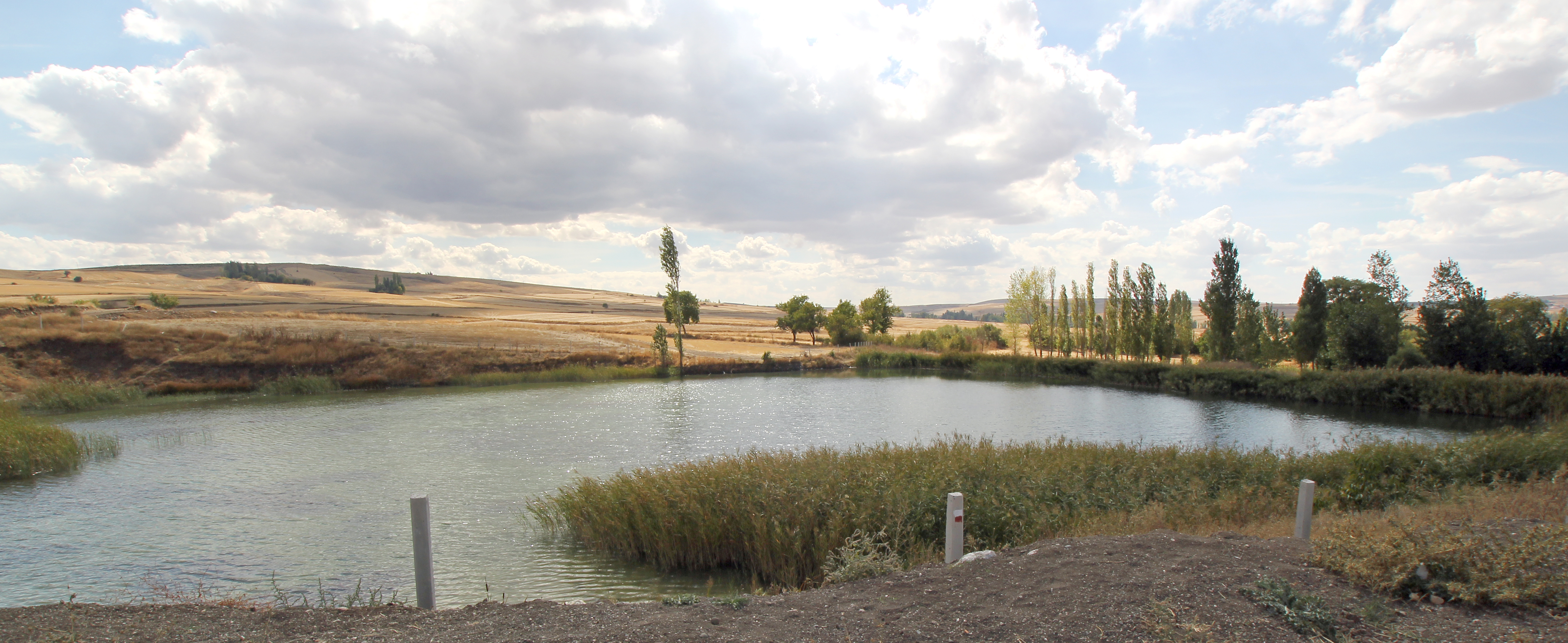
Gölpınar lake from the northeast; dam wall at right

The Gölpınar Dam, also known as the Alacahöyük Dam, is a Hittite dam from the second millennium BC, near Alaca Höyük in central Turkey.

== History ==
A Hittite inscription in Luwian hieroglyphs found during excavation of the area indicates that the structure was dedicated to the Hittite goddess Ḫepat. This goddess was honoured by Puduhepa, the wife of Great King Hattusili III, who called herself the goddess' servant. From a cuneiform document it is known that her son, Tudhaliya IV, who succeeded Hattusili, had ten dams built in the Hittite empire around 1240 BC after a period of drought. From this it may be concluded that the Gölpınar dam is the work of Tudhaliya. It provided irrigation water and possibly drinking water to the inhabitants of Alaca Höyük.

The dam was first discovered and partially exposed during the Turkish archaeologists Hâmit Zübeyir Koşay and Remzi Oğuz Arık's excavations at Alaca Höyük in 1935. Between 2002 and 2007, the dam was fully excavated, repaired and placed back in active use by the Turkish archaeologists Aykut Çınaroğlu und Elif Genç in collaboration with the Turkish State Hydraulic Works (Devlet Su İşleri). As a result, a lake of around a million cubic metres was created, which can be used to irrigate around 20 hectares of farmland.

== Location and structure ==
The dam is located in a hilly area about 1.5 kilometres southeast of the hill settlement of Alaca Höyük in the İlçe of Alaca in Çorum province on the road to Karamahmut and the town of Alaca.

The nearly rectangular reservoir measures around 110 metres from west to east and around 100 metres from north to south. Three sides of the reservoir are edged with rubble, while the dam at the western end forms the fourth side. With a depth at the centre of 2.5 metres, the pool had a capacity of 27,500 cubic metres. It was fed by several springs within the reservoir, the most important of which lay in the southwest of the basin. In front of the dam was a 130 metres long spillway basin, flanked by two canals. At both ends of the dam were sluices, for overflow which it was possible to put back into partial use. The total thickness of the dam is around 15 metres, it rises more than two metres above the water level. The dam structure is composed of roughly fist-sized stones, which were made waterproof using clay. The base of the spillway is also covered with clay.

West of the dam there was a wall with three pedestals made of sandstone, limestone and andesite respectively. In the pool, at the crest of the dam, a pedestal with the aforementioned inscribed stele in honour of Ḫepat came to light. In addition, a golden decoration with a ruby in it was uncovered, probably a pendant.

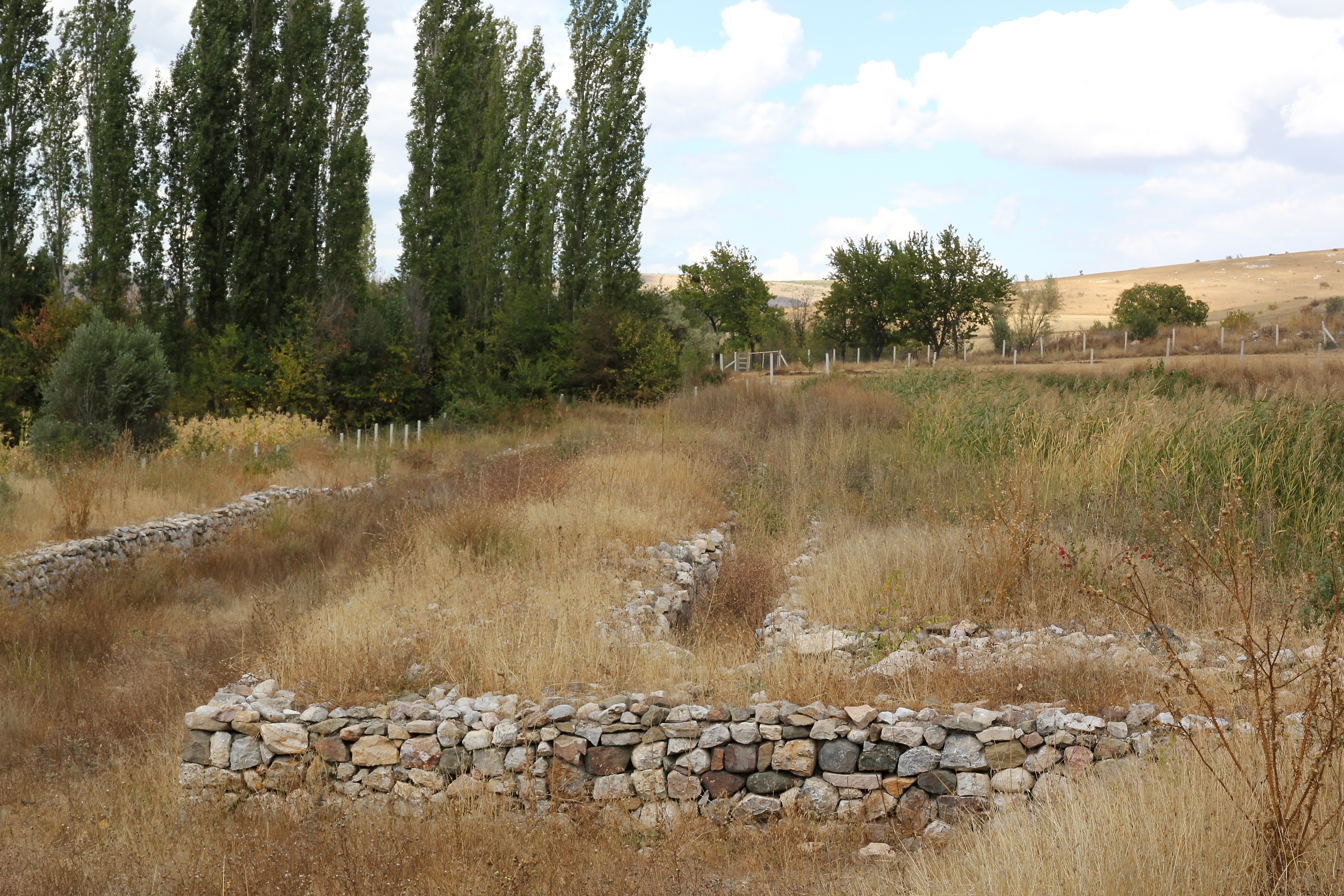
Dam with spillway and canals from the south

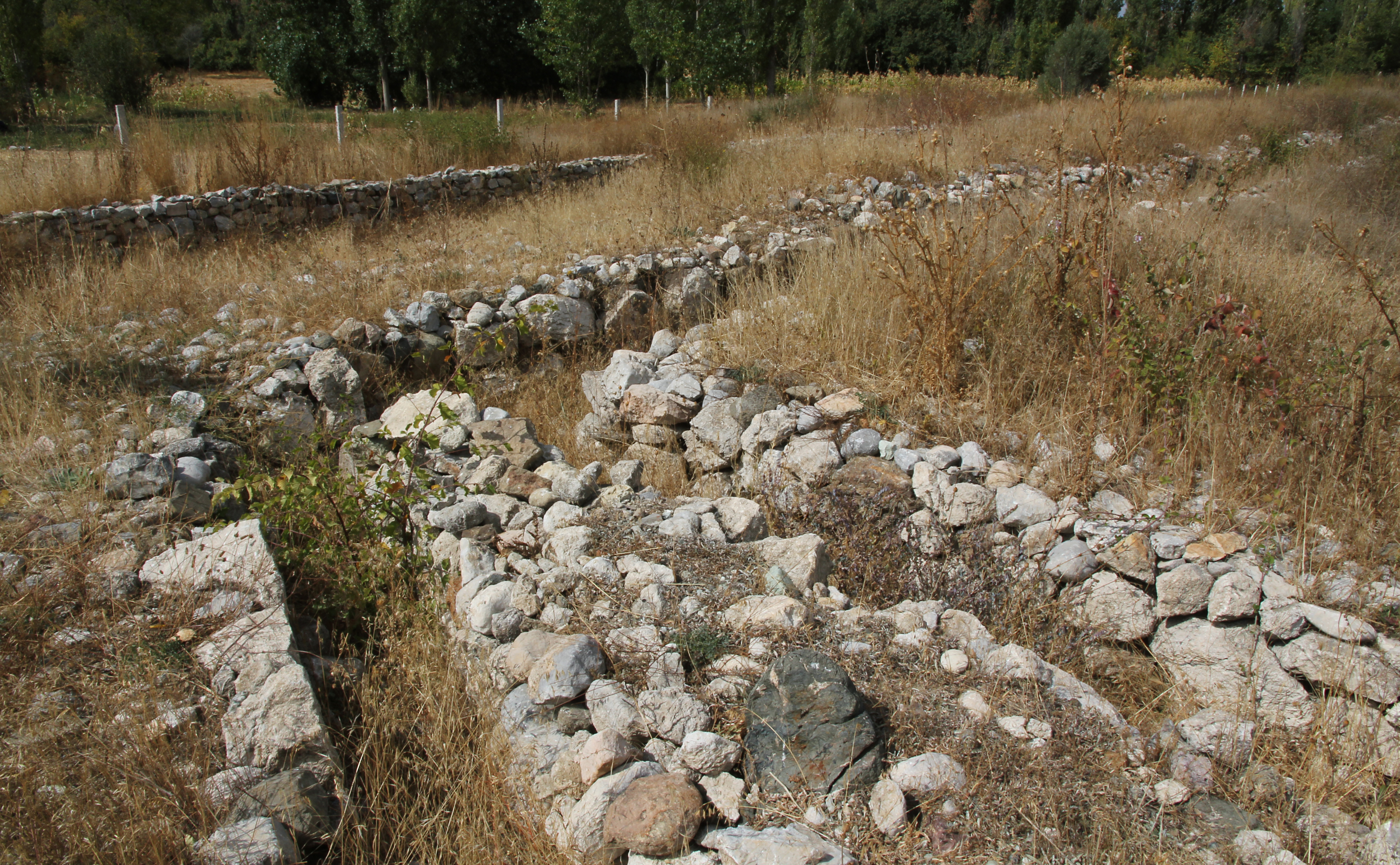
Canal and sluice at the south end

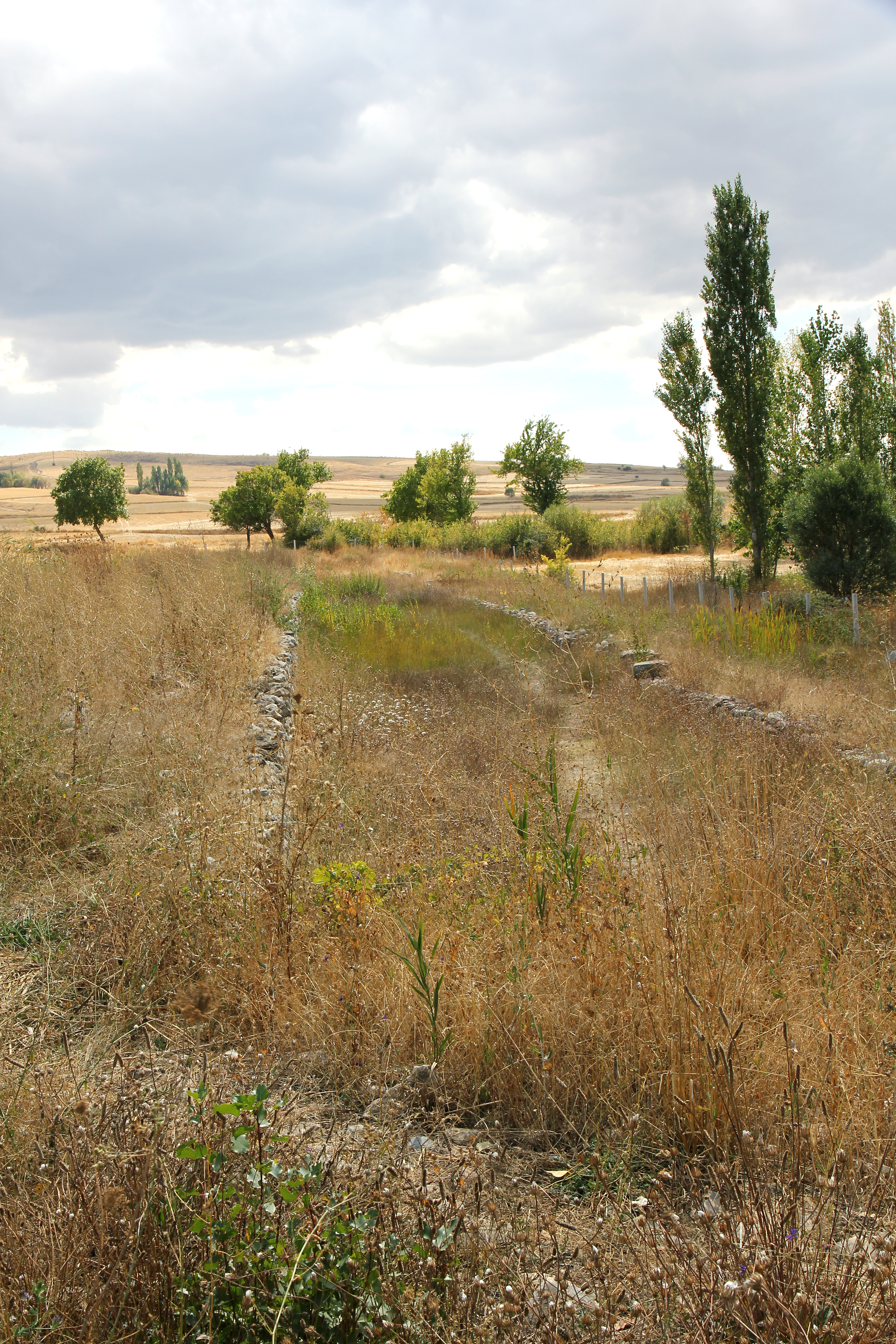
Dam from the north

== Bibliography ==
- Aykut Çınaroğlu, Elif Genç: "Alaca Höyük ve Alaca Höyük Barajı Kazıları," Kazı Sonuçları Toplantısı Vol. 25.1 T.C. Kültür Bakanlığı, 2003, pp. 278–288.
- Aykut Çınaroğlu, Elif Genç: "2003 Yılı Alaca Höyük ve Alaca Höyük Barajı Kazıları," Kazı Sonuçları Toplantısı Vol. 26.1 T.C. Kültür Bakanlığı, 2004, pp. 265–276.
- Aykut Çınaroğlu, Elif Genç: "2004 Yılı Alaca Höyük ve Alaca Höyük Barajı Kazıları," Kazı Sonuçları Toplantısı Vol. 27.1 T.C. Kültür Bakanlığı, 2005, pp. 1–6.
