= Kılavuz =

Kılavuz can refer to the following places in Turkey:

- Kılavuz, Alaca, a village in Alaca District, Çorum Province
- Kılavuz, Bor, a village in Bor District, Niğde Province
- Kılavuz, Dargeçit, a neighbourhood of the municipality and district of Dargeçit, Mardin Province
- Kılavuz, Oğuzeli, a neighbourhood of the municipality and district of Oğuzeli, Gaziantep Province
