= Küre =

Küre can refer to:

- Küre, Alaca
- Küre, Kastamonu
