= Beşiktepe =

Beşiktepe can refer to:

- Beşiktepe, Alaca
- Beşiktepe, Göynücek
