= Küçükcamili =

Küçükcamili can refer to:

- Küçükcamili, Alaca
- Küçükcamili, Bala
