= Büyükcamili =

Büyükcamili can refer to:

- Büyükcamili, Alaca
- Büyükcamili, Bala
