= Perçem =

Perçem (Turkish lit. 'lock of hair, fringe, bangs') can refer to:

- Perçem, Alaca, Turkey
- Perçem, Refahiye, Turkey
- Perchem or Perçem, a mountain in Crimea
- Perçem, a lock of hair on a shaved head in the Ottoman Empire
