= Kızıllı =

Kızıllı can refer to:

- Kızıllı, Alaca
- Kızıllı, Antalya
- Kızıllı, Bucak
- Kızıllı, Dinar
