= Çöplü =

Çöplü can refer to:

- Çöplü, Alaca
- Çöplü, Tarsus
