= Gökören =

Gökören can refer to:

- Gökören, Alaca
- Gökören, Mudurnu
