= Cromen =

Town in the west of ancient Pontus

Cromen Κρόμην
- Ancient town
- Interactive map of Cromen
- Coordinates: 40°42′03″N 35°32′12″E
- Region: Pontus
- Historical era: Roman and Byzantine periods
- Abandoned: After Byzantine period
- Mentioned in the Tabula Peutingeriana as 11 M.P. from Amasia

Cromen was a town in the west of ancient Pontus, inhabited in Roman and Byzantine times. According to the Tabula Peutingeriana it was 11 M.P. from Amasia.

Its site is located near Çatalkaya, Asiatic Turkey.
