= Kapaklı (disambiguation) =

Kapaklı can refer to the following places in Turkey:

- Kapaklı, a district of Tekirdağ Province
- Kapaklı, Alaca
- Kapaklı, Burdur
- Kapaklı, Daday, a village
- Kapaklı, Kızılırmak
- Kapaklı, Kurşunlu
- Kapaklı, Manyas
