= Onbaşılar =

Onbaşılar can refer to:

- Onbaşılar, Alaca
- Onbaşılar, Silvan
