= Mahmudiye (disambiguation) =

Mahmudiye is the honorific title given after Mahmud II (1785 – 1839), who reigned as the 30th sultan of the Ottoman Empire between 1808 and 1839.

Mahmudiye can refer to:

- Mahmudiye, Turkey
- Mahmudiye, Alaca
- Mahmudiye, Ezine
- Ottoman ship Mahmudiye
- Ottoman ironclad Mahmudiye
