= Balçıkhisar, Alaca =

Village in Turkey

Balçıkhisar
- Village
- Location in Turkey
- Coordinates: 40.0911°N 34.9824°E
- Country: Turkey
- Province: Çorum
- District: Alaca
- Population (2022): 75
- Time zone: UTC+3 (TRT)

Balçıkhisar is a village in the Alaca District of Çorum Province in Turkey. Its population is 75 (2022).
