= Çevreli, Alaca =

Village in Turkey

Çevreli
- Village
- Location in Turkey
- Coordinates: 40.2307°N 34.7598°E
- Country: Turkey
- Province: Çorum
- District: Alaca
- Population (2022): 98
- Time zone: UTC+3 (TRT)

Çevreli is a village in the Alaca District of Çorum Province in Turkey. Its population is 98 (2022). The village is populated by turks.
