= Kürkçü, Alaca =

Village in Turkey

Kürkçü
- Village
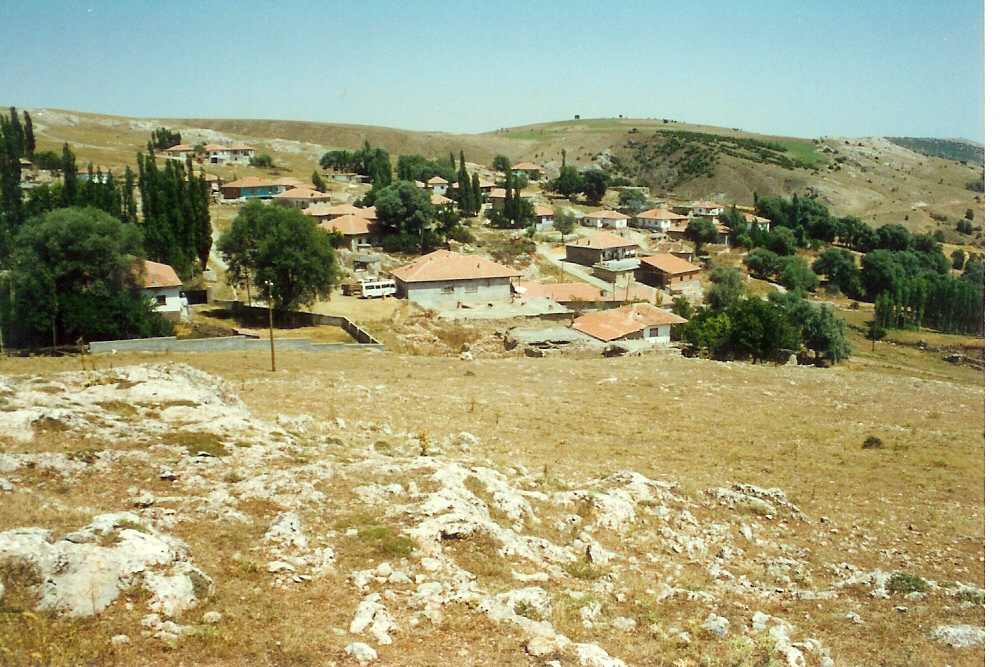

- Location within Turkey
- Country: Turkey
- Province: Çorum
- District: Alaca
- Population (2022): 56
- Time zone: UTC+3 (TRT)

Kürkçü is a village in the Alaca District of Çorum Province in Turkey. Its population is 56 (2022).
