= Gerdekkaya, Alaca =

Village in Turkey

Gerdekkaya
- Village
- Location in Turkey
- Coordinates: 40°08′07″N 35°02′49″E
- Country: Turkey
- Province: Çorum
- District: Alaca
- Population (2022): 31
- Time zone: UTC+3 (TRT)

Gerdekkaya is a village in the Alaca District of Çorum Province in Turkey. Its population is 31 (2022).
