= Eskiyapar, Alaca =

Village in Turkey

Eskiyapar
- Village
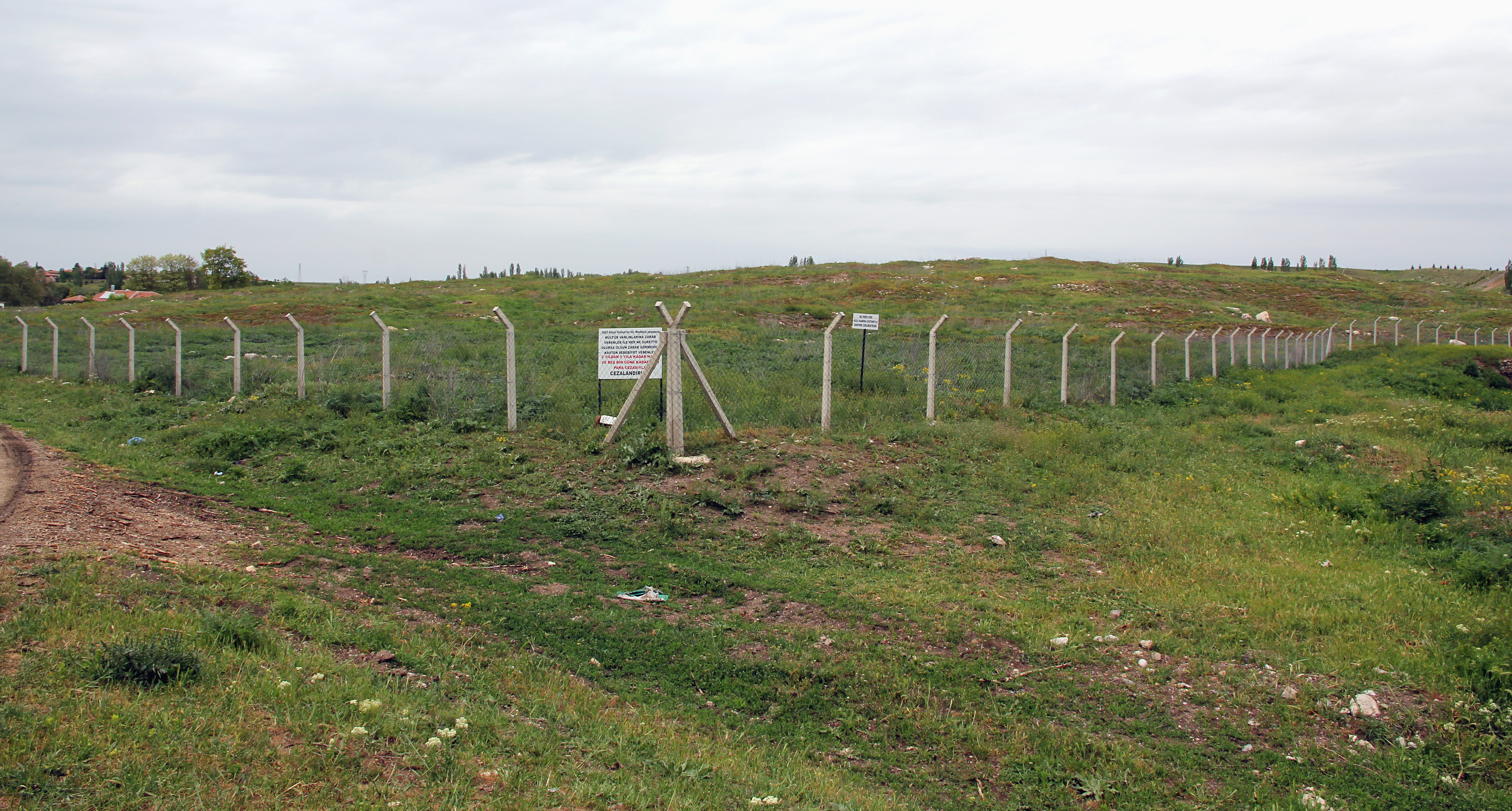
- Eskiyapar, ancient settlement mound in the northern Turkish province of Çorum, view from the south

- Location within Turkey
- Coordinates: 40°10′N 34°46′E
- Country: Turkey
- Province: Çorum
- District: Alaca
- Population (2022): 199
- Time zone: UTC+3 (TRT)

Eskiyapar is a village in the Alaca District of Çorum Province in Turkey. Its population is 199 (2022).
