= Akören, Alaca =

Village in Turkey

Akören
- Village
- Location in Turkey
- Coordinates: 40.1258°N 34.9568°E
- Country: Turkey
- Province: Çorum
- District: Alaca
- Population (2022): 70
- Time zone: UTC+3 (TRT)

Akören is a village in the Alaca District of Çorum Province in Turkey. Its population is 70 (2022).
