= Miyanesultan, Alaca =

Village in Turkey

Miyanesultan
- Village
- Location in Turkey
- Coordinates: 40°17′26″N 34°57′47″E
- Country: Turkey
- Province: Çorum
- District: Alaca
- Population (2022): 47
- Time zone: UTC+3 (TRT)

Miyanesultan is a village in the Alaca District of Çorum Province in Turkey. Its population is 47 (2022).
