= Gazipaşa, Alaca =

Village in Turkey

Gazipaşa
- Village
- Location in Turkey
- Coordinates: 40°04′21″N 35°06′06″E
- Country: Turkey
- Province: Çorum
- District: Alaca
- Population (2022): 350
- Time zone: UTC+3 (TRT)

Gazipaşa is a village in the Alaca District of Çorum Province in Turkey. Its population is 350 (2022). The village is populated by Kurds.
