= Karatepe, Alaca =

Village in Turkey

Karatepe
- Village
- Country: Turkey
- Province: Çorum
- District: Alaca
- Population (2022): 33
- Time zone: UTC+3 (TRT)

Karatepe is a village in the Alaca District of Çorum Province in Turkey. As of 2022, its population was 33.
