= Dereyazıcı, Alaca =

Village in Turkey

Dereyazıcı
- Village
- Location in Turkey
- Coordinates: 40°17′N 34°58′E
- Country: Turkey
- Province: Çorum
- District: Alaca
- Population (2022): 49
- Time zone: UTC+3 (TRT)

Dereyazıcı is a village in the Alaca District of Çorum Province in Turkey. Its population is 49 (2022).
