= Kıcılı, Alaca =

Village in Turkey

Kıcılı
- Village
- Location in Turkey
- Coordinates: 40°09′N 34°43′E
- Country: Turkey
- Province: Çorum
- District: Alaca
- Population (2022): 81
- Time zone: UTC+3 (TRT)

Kıcılı is a village in the Alaca District of Çorum Province in Turkey. Its population is 81 (2022).
