= Bahçeli, Alaca =

Village in Turkey

Bahçeli
- Village
- Location in Turkey
- Coordinates: 40.0866°N 35.1215°E
- Country: Turkey
- Province: Çorum
- District: Alaca
- Population (2022): 155
- Time zone: UTC+3 (TRT)

Bahçeli is a village in the Alaca District of Çorum Province in Turkey. Its population is 155 (2022).
