= Kuyumcusaray, Alaca =

Village in Turkey

Kuyumcusaray
- Village
- Location in Turkey
- Coordinates: 40°04′N 34°52′E
- Country: Turkey
- Province: Çorum
- District: Alaca
- Population (2022): 65
- Time zone: UTC+3 (TRT)

Kuyumcusaray is a village in the Alaca District of Çorum Province in Turkey. Its population is 65 (2022).
