= Tevfikiye, Alaca =

Village in Turkey

Tevfikiye
- Village
- Country: Turkey
- Province: Çorum
- District: Alaca
- Population (2022): 12
- Time zone: UTC+3 (TRT)

Tevfikiye is a village in the Alaca District of Çorum Province in Turkey. Its population is 12 (2022).
