= Killik, Alaca =

Village in Turkey

Killik
- Village
- Country: Turkey
- Province: Çorum
- District: Alaca
- Population (2022): 287
- Time zone: UTC+3 (TRT)

Killik is a village in the Alaca District of Çorum Province in Turkey. Its population is 287 (2022).
