= Büyükkeşlik, Alaca =

Village in Turkey

Büyükkeşlik
- Village
- Location in Turkey
- Coordinates: 40°15′N 35°03′E
- Country: Turkey
- Province: Çorum
- District: Alaca
- Population (2022): 27
- Time zone: UTC+3 (TRT)

Büyükkeşlik is a village in the Alaca District of Çorum Province in Turkey. Its population is 27 (2022). The village is populated by Kurds.
