= Dedepınar, Alaca =

Village in Turkey

Dedepınar
- Village
- Location in Turkey
- Coordinates: 40°7′45″N 34°45′47″E
- Country: Turkey
- Province: Çorum
- District: Alaca
- Population (2022): 53
- Time zone: UTC+3 (TRT)

Dedepınar is a village in the Alaca District of Çorum Province in Turkey. Its population is 53 (2022).
