= Büyükhırka, Alaca =

Village in Turkey

Büyükhırka
- Village
- Location in Turkey
- Coordinates: 40°03′13″N 34°45′32″E
- Country: Turkey
- Province: Çorum
- District: Alaca
- Population (2022): 464
- Time zone: UTC+3 (TRT)

Büyükhırka is a village in the Alaca District of Çorum Province in Turkey. Its population is 464 (2022). The village is populated by Kurds. Before the 2013 reorganisation, it was a town (belde).
