= Seyitnizam, Alaca =

Village in Turkey

Seyitnizam
- Village
- Location in Turkey
- Coordinates: 40°05′N 35°06′E
- Country: Turkey
- Province: Çorum
- District: Alaca
- Population (2022): 22
- Time zone: UTC+3 (TRT)

Seyitnizam is a village in the Alaca District of Çorum Province in Turkey. Its population is 22 (2022).
