= Küçükhırka, Alaca =

Village in Turkey

Küçükhırka
- Village
- Location in Turkey
- Coordinates: 40°03′N 34°42′E
- Country: Turkey
- Province: Çorum
- District: Alaca
- Population (2022): 220
- Time zone: UTC+3 (TRT)

Küçükhırka is a village in the Alaca District of Çorum Province in Turkey. Its population is 220 (2022).
