= Çatak, Alaca =

Village in Turkey

Çatak
- Village
- Location within Turkey
- Coordinates: 40°12′18″N 34°59′58″E
- Country: Turkey
- Province: Çorum
- District: Alaca
- Population (2022): 76
- Time zone: UTC+3 (TRT)

Çatak is a village in the Alaca District of Çorum Province in Turkey. Its population as of 2022 is 76.
