= Kızkaraca, Alaca =

Village in Turkey

Kızkaraca
- Village
- Location within Turkey
- Coordinates: 40°12′N 34°47′E
- Country: Turkey
- Province: Çorum
- District: Alaca
- Population (2022): 72
- Time zone: UTC+3 (TRT)

Kızkaraca is a village in the Alaca District of Çorum Province in Turkey. Its population is 72 (2022).
