= Bozdoğan (surname) =

Turkish surname

Bozdoğan is a Turkish surname formed by the combination of the Turkish words boz ("gray, grey") and doğan ("falcon"). Notable people with the name include:

- Ahmet Mazhar Bozdoğan (born 1953), Turkish swimmer
- Can Bozdoğan (born 2001), German footballer of Turkish descent
