= Çikhasan, Alaca =

Village in Turkey

Çikhasan
- Village
- Location in Turkey
- Coordinates: 40°19′N 34°57′E
- Country: Turkey
- Province: Çorum
- District: Alaca
- Population (2022): 46
- Time zone: UTC+3 (TRT)

Çikhasan is a village in the Alaca District of Çorum Province in Turkey. Its population is 46 (2022). The village is populated by Kurds.turks
