= İsahacı, Alaca =

Village in Turkey

İsahacı
- Village
- Location in Turkey
- Coordinates: 40°09′03″N 34°55′33″E
- Country: Turkey
- Province: Çorum
- District: Alaca
- Population (2022): 89
- Time zone: UTC+3 (TRT)

İsahacı is a village in the Alaca District of Çorum Province in Turkey. Its population is 89 (2022).
