= Yatankavak, Alaca =

Village in Turkey

Yatankavak
- Village
- Location in Turkey
- Coordinates: 40°06′N 34°47′E
- Country: Turkey
- Province: Çorum
- District: Alaca
- Population (2022): 95
- Time zone: UTC+3 (TRT)

Yatankavak is a village in the Alaca District of Çorum Province in Turkey. Its population is 95 (2022).
