= Tutaş, Alaca =

Village in Turkey

Tutaş
- Village
- Location in Turkey
- Coordinates: 40°05′43″N 35°03′03″E
- Country: Turkey
- Province: Çorum
- District: Alaca
- Population (2022): 181
- Time zone: UTC+3 (TRT)

Tutaş is a village in the Alaca District of Çorum Province in Turkey. Its population is 181 (2022).
