= Küçükkeşlik, Alaca =

Village in Turkey

Küçükkeşlik
- Village
- Location in Turkey
- Coordinates: 40°15′31″N 34°38′51″E
- Country: Turkey
- Province: Çorum
- District: Alaca
- Population (2022): 60
- Time zone: UTC+3 (TRT)

Küçükkeşlik is a village in the Alaca District of Çorum Province in Turkey. Its population is 60 (2022).
