= Harhar, Alaca =

Village in Turkey

Harhar
- Village
- Location in Turkey
- Coordinates: 40°17′N 34°46′E
- Country: Turkey
- Province: Çorum
- District: Alaca
- Population (2022): 59
- Time zone: UTC+3 (TRT)

Harhar is a village in the Alaca District of Çorum Province in Turkey. Its population is 59 (2022). The village is populated by Kurds.
