= Akçaköy, Alaca =

Village in Turkey

Akçaköy
- Village
- Location in Turkey
- Coordinates: 40.0225°N 34.8241°E
- Country: Turkey
- Province: Çorum
- District: Alaca
- Population (2022): 180
- Time zone: UTC+3 (TRT)

Akçaköy is a village in the Alaca District of Çorum Province in Turkey. Its population is 180 (2022).

== History ==
The former name of the village was Manışar.
