= Çırçır, Alaca =

Village in Turkey

Çırçır
- Village
- Country: Turkey
- Province: Çorum
- District: Alaca
- Population (2022): 31
- Time zone: UTC+3 (TRT)

Çırçır is a village in the Alaca District of Çorum Province in Turkey. Its population is 31 (2022). The village is populated by Kurds.
