= Yüksekyayla, Alaca =

Village in Turkey

Yüksekyayla
- Village
- Location in Turkey
- Coordinates: 40°1′56″N 34°40′12″E
- Country: Turkey
- Province: Çorum
- District: Alaca
- Population (2022): 185
- Time zone: UTC+3 (TRT)

Yüksekyayla is a village in the Alaca District of Çorum Province in Turkey. Its population is 185 (2022). The village is populated by Kurds.
