= Külah, Alaca =

Village in Turkey

Külah
- Village
- Country: Turkey
- Province: Çorum
- District: Alaca
- Population (2022): 58
- Time zone: UTC+3 (TRT)

Külah is a village in the Alaca District of Çorum Province in Turkey. Its population is 58 (2022).
