= Altıntaş, Alaca =

Village in Turkey

Altıntaş
- Village
- Location in Turkey
- Coordinates: 40.0347°N 35.1307°E
- Country: Turkey
- Province: Çorum
- District: Alaca
- Population (2022): 80
- Time zone: UTC+3 (TRT)

Altıntaş is a Kabardian village in the Alaca District of Çorum Province in Turkey. Its population is 80 (2022).
