= Boğaziçi, Alaca =

Village in Turkey

Boğaziçi
- Village
- Location in Turkey
- Coordinates: 40.2090°N 34.8615°E
- Country: Turkey
- Province: Çorum
- District: Alaca
- Population (2022): 103
- Time zone: UTC+3 (TRT)

Boğaziçi is a village in the Alaca District of Çorum Province in Turkey. Its population is 103 (2022).
