= İsmailli, Alaca =

Village in Turkey

İsmailli
- Village
- Country: Turkey
- Province: Çorum
- District: Alaca
- Population (2022): 320
- Time zone: UTC+3 (TRT)

İsmailli is a village in the Alaca District of Çorum Province in Turkey. Its population is 320 (2022).
