= Çetederesi, Alaca =

Village in Turkey

Çetederesi
- Village
- Location in Turkey
- Coordinates: 40°00′13″N 34°54′32″E
- Country: Turkey
- Province: Çorum
- District: Alaca
- Population (2022): 24
- Time zone: UTC+3 (TRT)

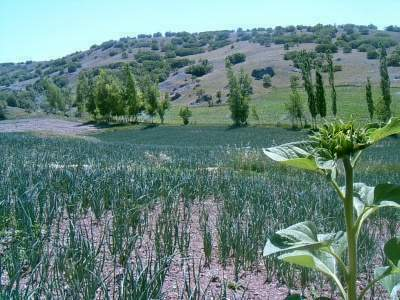
Nature in Çetederesi

Çetederesi is a village in the Alaca District of Çorum Province in Turkey. Its population is 24 (2022).
