= Bolatçık, Alaca =

Village in Turkey

Bolatçık
- Village
- Location in Turkey
- Coordinates: 40°07′N 35°01′E
- Country: Turkey
- Province: Çorum
- District: Alaca
- Population (2022): 214
- Time zone: UTC+3 (TRT)

Bolatçık is a village in the Alaca District of Çorum Province in Turkey. Its population is 214 (2022).
