= Kızılyar, Alaca =

Village in Turkey

Kızılyar
- Village
- Location in Turkey
- Coordinates: 40°4′20″N 34°57′24″E
- Country: Turkey
- Province: Çorum
- District: Alaca
- Population (2022): 45
- Time zone: UTC+3 (TRT)

Kızılyar is a village in the Alaca District of Çorum Province in Turkey. As of 2022, its population is 45.
