= Çopraşık, Alaca =

Village in Turkey

Çopraşık
- Village
- Country: Turkey
- Province: Çorum
- District: Alaca
- Population (2022): 306
- Time zone: UTC+3 (TRT)

Çopraşık is a village in the Alaca District of Çorum Province in Turkey. Its population is 306 (2022). The village is populated by Kurds. Before the 2013 reorganisation, it was a town (belde).
