= Akpınar, Alaca =

Village in Turkey

Akpınar
- Village
- Location in Turkey
- Coordinates: 40.2528°N 34.9868°E
- Country: Turkey
- Province: Çorum
- District: Alaca
- Population (2022): 110
- Time zone: UTC+3 (TRT)

Akpınar is a village in the Alaca District of Çorum Province in Turkey. Its population is 110 (2022).
