= Çatalbaş, Alaca =

Village in Turkey

Çatalbaş
- Village
- Location in Turkey
- Coordinates: 40°02′42″N 34°47′54″E
- Country: Turkey
- Province: Çorum
- District: Alaca
- Population (2022): 130
- Time zone: UTC+3 (TRT)

Çatalbaş is a village in the Alaca District of Çorum Province in Turkey. Its population is 130 (2022).
