= Örükaya, Alaca =

Village in Turkey

Örükaya
- Village
- Location in Turkey
- Coordinates: 40°07′N 34°54′E
- Country: Turkey
- Province: Çorum
- District: Alaca
- Population (2022): 23
- Time zone: UTC+3 (TRT)

Örükaya is a village in the Alaca District of Çorum Province in Turkey. Its population is 23 (2022).
