= Haydarköy, Alaca =

Village in Turkey

Haydarköy
- Village
- Country: Turkey
- Province: Çorum
- District: Alaca
- Population (2022): 56
- Time zone: UTC+3 (TRT)

Haydarköy is a village in the Alaca District of Çorum Province in Turkey. Its population is 56 (2022). The village is populated by Kurds.
