= Kalecikkaya, Alaca =

Village in Turkey

Kalecikkaya
- Village
- Location in Turkey
- Coordinates: 40°07′N 34°41′E
- Country: Turkey
- Province: Çorum
- District: Alaca
- Population (2022): 116
- Time zone: UTC+3 (TRT)

Kalecikkaya is a village in the Alaca District of Çorum Province in Turkey. Its population is 116 (2022).
