= Sarısüleyman, Alaca =

Village in Turkey

Sarısüleyman
- Village
- Location in Turkey
- Coordinates: 40°13′26″N 35°4′58″E
- Country: Turkey
- Province: Çorum
- District: Alaca
- Population (2022): 481
- Time zone: UTC+3 (TRT)

Sarısüleyman is a village in the Alaca District of Çorum Province in Turkey. Its population is 481 (2022).
