= Çöplüavutmuş, Alaca =

Village in Turkey

Çöplüavutmuş
- Village
- Location in Turkey
- Coordinates: 40°11′N 35°02′E
- Country: Turkey
- Province: Çorum
- District: Alaca
- Population (2022): 48
- Time zone: UTC+3 (TRT)

Çöplüavutmuş is a village in the Alaca District of Çorum Province in Turkey. Its population is 48 (2022).
