= Mazıbaşı, Alaca =

Village in Turkey

Mazıbaşı
- Village
- Location in Turkey
- Coordinates: 40°18′10″N 34°55′35″E
- Country: Turkey
- Province: Çorum
- District: Alaca
- Population (2022): 55
- Time zone: UTC+3 (TRT)

Mazıbaşı is a village in the Alaca District of Çorum Province in Turkey. Its population is 55 (2022). The village is populated by Kurds.
