= Sancı, Alaca =

Village in Turkey

Sancı
- Village
- Location in Turkey
- Coordinates: 40°10′13″N 35°06′56″E
- Country: Turkey
- Province: Çorum
- District: Alaca
- Population (2022): 107
- Time zone: UTC+3 (TRT)

Sancı is a village in the Alaca District of Çorum Province in Turkey. Its population is 107 (2022).
