= Kayabüvet, Alaca =

Village in Turkey

Kayabüvet
- Village
- Location in Turkey
- Coordinates: 40°06′N 34°53′E
- Country: Turkey
- Province: Çorum
- District: Alaca
- Population (2022): 29
- Time zone: UTC+3 (TRT)

Kayabüvet is a village in the Alaca District of Çorum Province in Turkey. Its population is 29 (2022).
