= Karnıkara, Alaca =

Village in Turkey

Karnıkara
- Village
- Location in Turkey
- Coordinates: 40°02′15″N 35°02′00″E
- Country: Turkey
- Province: Çorum
- District: Alaca
- Population (2022): 23
- Time zone: UTC+3 (TRT)

Karnıkara is a village in the Alaca District of Çorum Province in Turkey. Its population is 23 (2022).
