= Körpınar, Alaca =

Village in Turkey

Körpınar
- Village
- Country: Turkey
- Province: Çorum
- District: Alaca
- Population (2022): 14
- Time zone: UTC+3 (TRT)

Körpınar is a village in the Alaca District of Çorum Province in Turkey. Its population is 14 (2022).
