= Büyükdona, Alaca =

Village in Turkey

Büyükdona
- Village
- Location in Turkey
- Coordinates: 40°08′N 35°08′E
- Country: Turkey
- Province: Çorum
- District: Alaca
- Population (2022): 354
- Time zone: UTC+3 (TRT)

Büyükdona is a village in the Alaca District of Çorum Province in Turkey. Its population is 354 (2022). The village is populated by Kurds.
