= Beşiktepe, Alaca =

Village in Turkey

Beşiktepe
- Village
- Location in Turkey
- Coordinates: 40.1468°N 34.9955°E
- Country: Turkey
- Province: Çorum
- District: Alaca
- Population (2022): 24
- Time zone: UTC+3 (TRT)

Beşiktepe is a village in the Alaca District of Çorum Province in Turkey. Its population is 24 (2022).
