= Alacahüyük =

Village in Turkey

- Village
- Location in Turkey
- Coordinates: 40.2352°N 34.6979°E
- Country: Turkey
- Province: Çorum
- District: Alaca
- Population (2022): 250
- Time zone: UTC+3 (TRT)

Alacahüyük is a village in the Alaca District of Çorum Province in Turkey. Its population is 250 (2022). Before the 2013 reorganisation, it was a township (belde).
