= Sincan, Alaca =

Village in Turkey

Sincan
- Village
- Country: Turkey
- Province: Çorum
- District: Alaca
- Population (2022): 81
- Time zone: UTC+3 (TRT)

Sincan (Adyghe: Синджан) is a village in the Alaca District of Çorum Province in Turkey. Its population is 81 (2022). The village was founded by the Shapsugh branch of Circassians, however, their population in the village has since decreased and virtually none of them speak Adyghe.

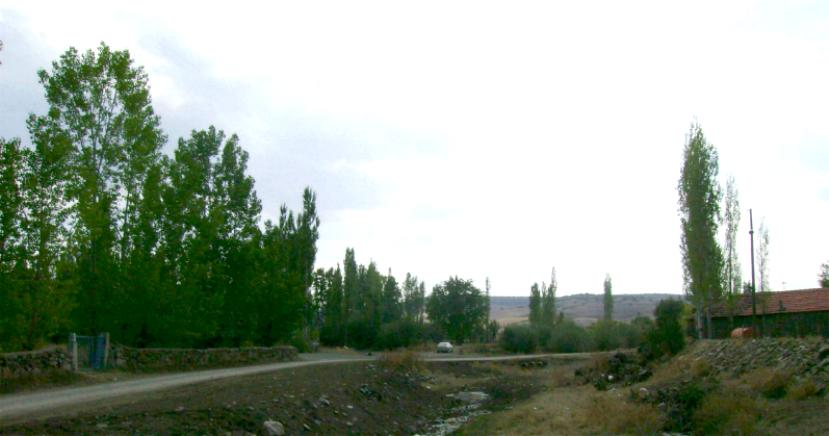
Sincan area
