= Gökören, Alaca =

Village in Turkey

Gökören
- Village
- Country: Turkey
- Province: Çorum
- District: Alaca
- Population (2022): 40
- Time zone: UTC+3 (TRT)

Gökören is a village in the Alaca District of Çorum Province in Turkey. Its population is 40 as of 2022, all ethnic Abazins.
