= Bozdoğan (tribe) =

Turkmen tribe in Turkey

Bozdoğan, or Buztughan (Ottoman Turkish: بوزطوغان, lit. 'grey falcon'; Medieval Greek: Ποσδογάνης, romanized: Posdogánis), is a Turkoman tribe.

== History ==
=== Medieval period ===
The Bozdoğan tribe appeared in Anatolia during the Mongol invasions. The Mongol Empire was later divided into several states, one of which was the Ilkhanate, centered around Iran. The weakening of the Ilkhanid army in Anatolia in the 1330s marked the start of new smaller-scale migrations among the local nomads. The Bozdoğan tribe, along with Chepni, Aq Qoyunlu, and Duharlu, possibly formed a tribal confederation as they migrated from western Anatolia to east following the Black Sea coast. In support of the western origin of the migratory route instead of the inner parts of eastern Anatolia, historian Rustam Shukurov points out the prior existence of the place name Bozdoğan within the Aydinid realm as well as another place in the Pontian region of Trikomia.

In 1348, Bozdoğan became associated with the Aq Qoyunlu tribe through a joint raid on the Empire of Trebizond. The eponymous leader of the tribe, Bozdoğan Beg was a chieftain loyal to Husayn Beg, who was an emir under Pir Muhammad, the ruler of the Sutayids. Following Husayn Beg's murder, Bozdoğan Beg and his tribe ransacked the area around the fortress of Heysem, which belonged to the Emirate of Hasankeyf. In 1352, the local emir and the Suleimani tribe of Kurds attacked Bozdoğan Beg when he attempted to ransack the region a second time on the way back to the yaylak near Mush. Bozdoğan Beg died in the skirmish that took place on 15 June. His sons Zia al-Mulk and Sa'd al-Mulk inherited the leadership and entered the service of Kadi Burhan al-Din, the ruler of the region around Kayseri and Sivas (r. 1381–98). In 1381, the Bozdoğan tribe took sides with Barquq (r. 1382–89, 1390–99), the Mamluk Sultan of Egypt and Syria, against the Dulkadirid ruler Ghars al-Din Khalil (r. 1353–1386) in southern Anatolia and northern Syria. Zia al-Mulk joined the Mamluk forces with a composite army of various Turkoman, Arab, and Kurdish tribes under his command, which assisted the Mamluks in their victory on 6 July seizing Marash. Two years later, following the news that pilgrims to Mosul were robbed by a chieftain of the Döğer tribe named Salim, Zia al-Mulk joined the Qara Qoyunlu chieftain Qara Mahammad (r. 1380–89) as part of an army of more than twelve thousand troops, which defeated Salim. The Bozdoğan tribe's alliance with the Aq Qoyunlu persisted in 1398, when Sa'd al-Mulk was involved in the execution of Kadi Burhan al-Din by Qara Yuluk, the leader of the Aq Qoyunlu (r. 1378–1435). However, sources following this event ceased linking Bozdoğan with the Aq Qoyunlu. During the 14th century, while a portion of the tribe dwelled in northern Syria and parts of Anatolia, a second group inhabited the Karamanid realm to the west.

=== Ottoman period ===
When the Karamanid domains were seized by the Ottoman Empire in the late 15th century, Bozdoğan came under the Ottoman rule. One branch of Bozdoğan inhabited Ichil, near Silifke on the southern Anatolian coastline, while another branch occupied the area around Şereflikoçhisar.

Several clans from Ichil, including Melemenji, Qarahajili, and Tekelu migrated to the Cilician Plain due to insufficient pastures and population increase. The Melemenji tribe settled in the region of Kusun, and the Menemenci family of ayans (notables) were involved in local politics in the region around Karaisalı. According to Victor Langlois, Bozdoğan consisted of about 14,000 tents in 1852 and was completely nomadic.

== Sub-tribes ==
In the 16th-century, the Bozdoğan tribe inhabiting İçil Sanjak contained 31 sub-tribes:

- Burhanlar
- Bahaeddinlu
- Gomech
- Deli Kojalu
- Bichakchilar
- Kulaklu
- Kuchuk Ashiklu
- Qara Fakihler
- Ilhan
- Qara Umarlu
- Karkun
- Koseler
- Gedik Hajjilu
- Sendeller
- Qara Jihanlar
- Qara Qayalu
- Panjarji
- Beghil
- Jivanlar
- Evliya Chavush
- Injirji (Qara Bozdoghan)
- Jabirlu
- Aq
- Esehanlar
- Ahad
- Ali Hoja
- Avjular
- Ejalar
- Goynuklu
- Naljilar
- Nalji Hasan

== Bibliography ==
- Demir, Alpaslan (January 2007). "16. yy.da Bozdoğan Teşekküllerinin Nüfusu ve İktisadi Yapısı (İçel ve Çevresi)" [The Population and Economical Structure of 16th-century Bozdoğan Groups]. In Beşirli, Hayati; Erdal, İbrahim (eds.). Anadolu'da Yörükler Tarihî ve Sosyolojik İncelemeler [The History and Sociological Studies of the Yörüks in Anatolia] (in Turkish). Ankara: Phoenix Yayınevi. ISBN 978-9944-931-21-2. OCLC 144511957.
- Eberhard, Wolfram (1967). Settlement and social change in Asia. Vol. 1. Hong Kong University Press. ISBN 9780608117140.
- Shukurov, Rustam [in Russian] (9 May 2016). The Byzantine Turks, 1204-1461. Brill. ISBN 9789004307759. OCLC 946032551.
- Sümer, Faruk (1967). Kara Koyunlular (Başlangıçtan Cihanşah'a Kadar) [Qara Qoyunlus (From the Beginning until Jahan Shah)] (in Turkish). Ankara: Turkish Historical Society Press. ISBN 978-975-17-4847-8. OCLC 1321247020.
- Sümer, Faruk (2016). "Menemencioğulları". TDV Encyclopedia of Islam, Supplement 2 (Kâfûr, Ebü'l-Misk – Züreyk, Kostantin) (in Turkish). Istanbul: Presidency of Religious Affairs, Centre for Islamic Studies. pp. 249–251. ISBN 978-975-389-889-8.
- Woods, John E. (1999). The Aqquyunlu: Clan, Confederation, Empire (Revised and Expanded ed.). University of Utah Press. ISBN 9780874805659. OCLC 44966081.
- Yinanç, Refet (1989). Dulkadir Beyliği (in Turkish). Ankara: Turkish Historical Society Press. ISBN 9751601711. OCLC 21676736.
