= Akçiçek, Alaca =

Village in Turkey

Akçiçek
- Village
- Location in Turkey
- Coordinates: 40.0813°N 34.6627°E
- Country: Turkey
- Province: Çorum
- District: Alaca
- Population (2022): 57
- Time zone: UTC+3 (TRT)

Akçiçek is a village in the Alaca District of Çorum Province in Turkey. Its population is 57 (2022).
