= Sincan, Azerbaijan =

Sincan
- Municipality
- Location within Azerbaijan Location within Shaki-Zagatala Economic Region
- Coordinates: 40°56′41″N 47°34′54″E
- Country: Azerbaijan
- Rayon: Oghuz

Population
  - Total: 1,419
- Time zone: UTC+4 (AZT)
  - Summer (DST): UTC+5 (AZT)

Sincan (also, Sindzhan and Sindzhav) is a village and municipality in the Oghuz Rayon of Azerbaijan. It has a population of 1,419.

Much of the water supplied to Baku originates in wells at Sincan and is then transferred at 5 cubic metres per second through a 262.5 km pipeline built at the cost of 779,600,000 manats (over half a billion US$).
