= Bozdoğan, Alaca =

Village in Turkey

Bozdoğan
- Village
- Location in Turkey
- Coordinates: 40.1550°N 35.0573°E
- Country: Turkey
- Province: Çorum
- District: Alaca
- Population (2022): 55
- Time zone: UTC+3 (TRT)

Bozdoğan is a village in the Alaca District of Çorum Province in Turkey. Its population is 55 (2022).
