= Alaca District =

District of Çorum Province, Turkey

- District
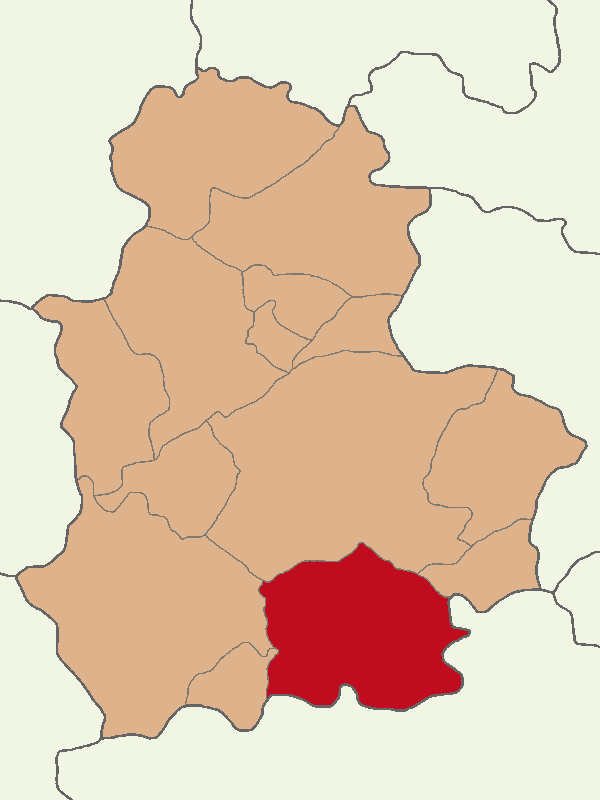
- Map showing Alaca District in Çorum Province

- Location within Turkey
- Coordinates: 40°27′N 34°28′E
- Country: Turkey
- Province: Çorum
- Seat: Alaca

Government
  - Kaymakam: Hicabi Aytemür
- Area: 1,296 km^{2} (500 sq mi)
- Population (2022): 29,929
  - Density: 23.09/km^{2} (59.81/sq mi)
- Time zone: UTC+3 (TRT)
- Website: www.alaca.gov.tr

Alaca District is a district of the Çorum Province of Turkey. Its seat is the town of Alaca. Its area is 1,296 km^{2}, and its population is 29,929 (2022).

== Toponymy ==
It was previous called Hüseyinabad.

== Composition ==
There is one municipality in Alaca District:

- Alaca

There are 101 villages in Alaca District:

- Akçaköy
- Akçiçek
- Akören
- Akpınar
- Alacahüyük
- Altıntaş
- Bahçeli
- Balçıkhisar
- Belpınar
- Beşiktepe
- Boğaziçi
- Bolatçık
- Bozdoğan
- Büyükcamili
- Büyükdona
- Büyükhırka
- Büyükkeşlik
- Büyüksöğütözü
- Çalköy
- Çatak
- Çatalbaş
- Çatalkaya
- Çelebibağı
- Çetederesi
- Çevreli
- Çırçır
- Çikhasan
- Çöplü
- Çöplüavutmuş
- Çopraşık
- Dedepınar
- Değirmendere
- Değirmenönü
- Dereyazıcı
- Dutluca
- Eren
- Eskiyapar
- Evci
- Fakılar
- Gazipaşa
- Gerdekkaya
- Geven
- Gökören
- Gülderesi
- Güllük
- Harhar
- Haydarköy
- İbrahimköy
- İmat
- İsahacı
- İsmailli
- Kalecikkaya
- Kalınkaya
- Kapaklı
- Karaçal
- Karamahmut
- Karatepe
- Kargın
- Karnıkara
- Kayabüvet
- Kıcılı
- Kılavuz
- Killik
- Kızıllı
- Kızılyar
- Kızkaraca
- Koçhisar
- Körpınar
- Koyunoğlu
- Küçükcamili
- Küçükdona
- Küçükhırka
- Küçükkeşlik
- Külah
- Küre
- Kürkçü
- Kuyluş
- Kuyumcusaray
- Kuzkışla
- Mahmudiye
- Mazıbaşı
- Miyanesultan
- Onbaşılar
- Örükaya
- Perçem
- Sancı
- Sarısüleyman
- Seyitnizam
- Sincan
- Soğucak
- Sultanköy
- Suludere
- Tahirabat
- Tevfikiye
- Tutaş
- Ünalan
- Yatankavak
- Yenice
- Yeniköy
- Yeşilyurt
- Yüksekyayla

== Population ==
Population
Year	Alaca town	Villages	Total
2022	19,510	10,419	29,929
2000	24,983	28,210	53,193
1990	20,646	32,757	53,403
1980	15,649	41,075	56,724
1970	9,674	46,983	56,657
1960	7,168	47,147	54,315
1950	3,843	42,601	46,444
1927	2,066	24,721	26,787
