= Mahmudiye, Alaca =

Village in Turkey

Mahmudiye
- Village
- Country: Turkey
- Province: Çorum
- District: Alaca
- Population (2022): 102
- Time zone: UTC+3 (TRT)

Mahmudiye (Adyghe: Хажемыкохаблэ, romanized: Hajemikohablə), formerly Karahisar, is a village in the Alaca District of Çorum Province in Turkey. Its population is 102 (2022). The village is predominantly populated by ethnic Circassians from the Abdzakh tribe.
