= Değirmenönü, Alaca =

Village in Turkey

Değirmenönü
- Village
- Country: Turkey
- Province: Çorum
- District: Alaca
- Population (2022): 63
- Time zone: UTC+3 (TRT)

Değirmenönü is a village in the Alaca District of Çorum Province in Turkey. Its population is 63 (2022). The village is populated by Kurds.
