= Karaçal Dam =

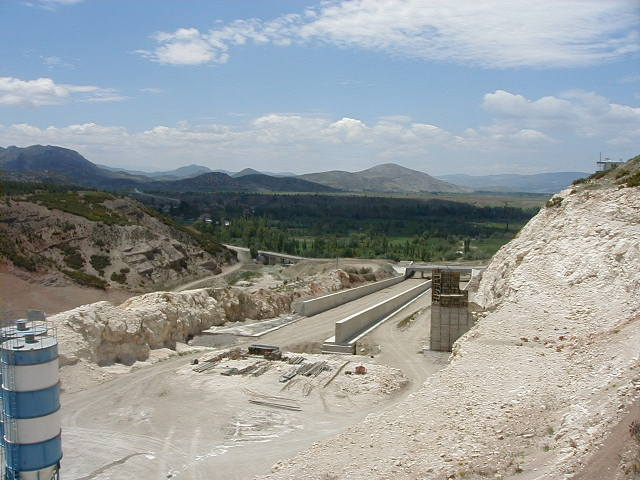
- Interactive map of Karaçal Dam
- Location: Burdur, Turkey
- Construction began: 1993
- Opening date: 2002

Karaçal Dam is a dam in Burdur, Turkey. The development was backed by the Turkish State Hydraulic Works. Construction on the dam began in 1993 and finished in 2002, and it is still in use.

== See also ==
- List of dams and reservoirs in Turkey
