= Kapaklı, Alaca =

Village in Turkey

Kapaklı Altugueyhable
- Village
- Country: Turkey
- Province: Çorum
- District: Alaca
- Population (2022): 69
- Time zone: UTC+3 (TRT)

Kapaklı (Kabardian: Алътыгъуейхьэблэ, romanized: Altugueyhablə) is a village that is located in the Alaca District of Çorum Province in Turkey. Its population was 69 as of 2022.
