= Belpınar, Alaca =

Village in Turkey

Belpınar
- Village
- Location in Turkey
- Coordinates: 40.0561°N 35.1515°E
- Country: Turkey
- Province: Çorum
- District: Alaca
- Population (2022): 149
- Time zone: UTC+3 (TRT)

Belpınar is a village in the Alaca District of Çorum Province in Turkey. Its population is 149 (2022).
