= Ahmet Mazhar Bozdoğan =

Turkish swimmer (1953–2022)

Personal information
- Born: 28 February 1953 Adana, Turkey
- Died: January 25, 2022 (aged 68)

Sport
- Sport: Swimming

Ahmet Mazhar Bozdoğan (28 February 1953–January 25, 2022) was the President of the Turkish Swimming Federation since 2008. He is also a former National and record-holder swimmer, swimming coach and academician.

== Early life ==
He was born in Adana in 1953. He studied primary school at Ata College and Cukurova College, high school at Adana College and Isık College. Ahmet Bozdogan who studied BSc at Cukurova University, is married and has two children.

== Career as an athlete ==
He was introduced to the sport of swimming at the elementary school. He won the first champion title at National Championships which was held in 1966 in Adana, Turkey. He broke 11 national records at National Swimming Championships held in 1970. However, in such a short period of two months, he broke 36 national swimming records so his name can be found in Turkish Sports History. He was called as Golden Child, Platinum Kid, record-breaking machine, etc. He has been the holder of 100, 200, 400, 800, and 1500 metres freestyle junior records, and 200, 400, 800, and 1500 freestyle open age records during the period of 10 years from 1966 to 1976. He has represented his country at World Championships, Mediterranean Games, Balkan Championships, and European Championships for 12 years in a row and has many gold medals at international competitions.

He was transferred from Adana Demirspor Club to Galatasaray Sports Club. He was also a waterpolo player at Galatasaray. He ended his career as an athlete in 1977–1978 season at Galatasaray Sports Club.

== Career as an academician ==
He started his academic career as an instructor at Anadoluhisari Sport Academy in 1977. He coached many swimming trainers and athletes during more than 10 years. He was the member of board who is responsible of National Swim Team at Turkish Swimming Federation from 2000 to 2004. He published the first book of his series of five books about the sport of swimming in 1986.

Bozdogan worked at Marmara University school of physical education and sports as an assistant professor at the division of swimming training until his death.

== President of the Turkish Swimming Federation ==
He was elected as the President of the Turkish Swimming Federation in 2008. One of his major projects was actualized in 2013: He brought Bob Bowman, the Coach of Michael Phelps, to the Turkish Swimming as a fully entitled Advisor.

== Death ==
He died on 25 January 2022.
