= Alaca, Çorum =

Alaca
- Municipality
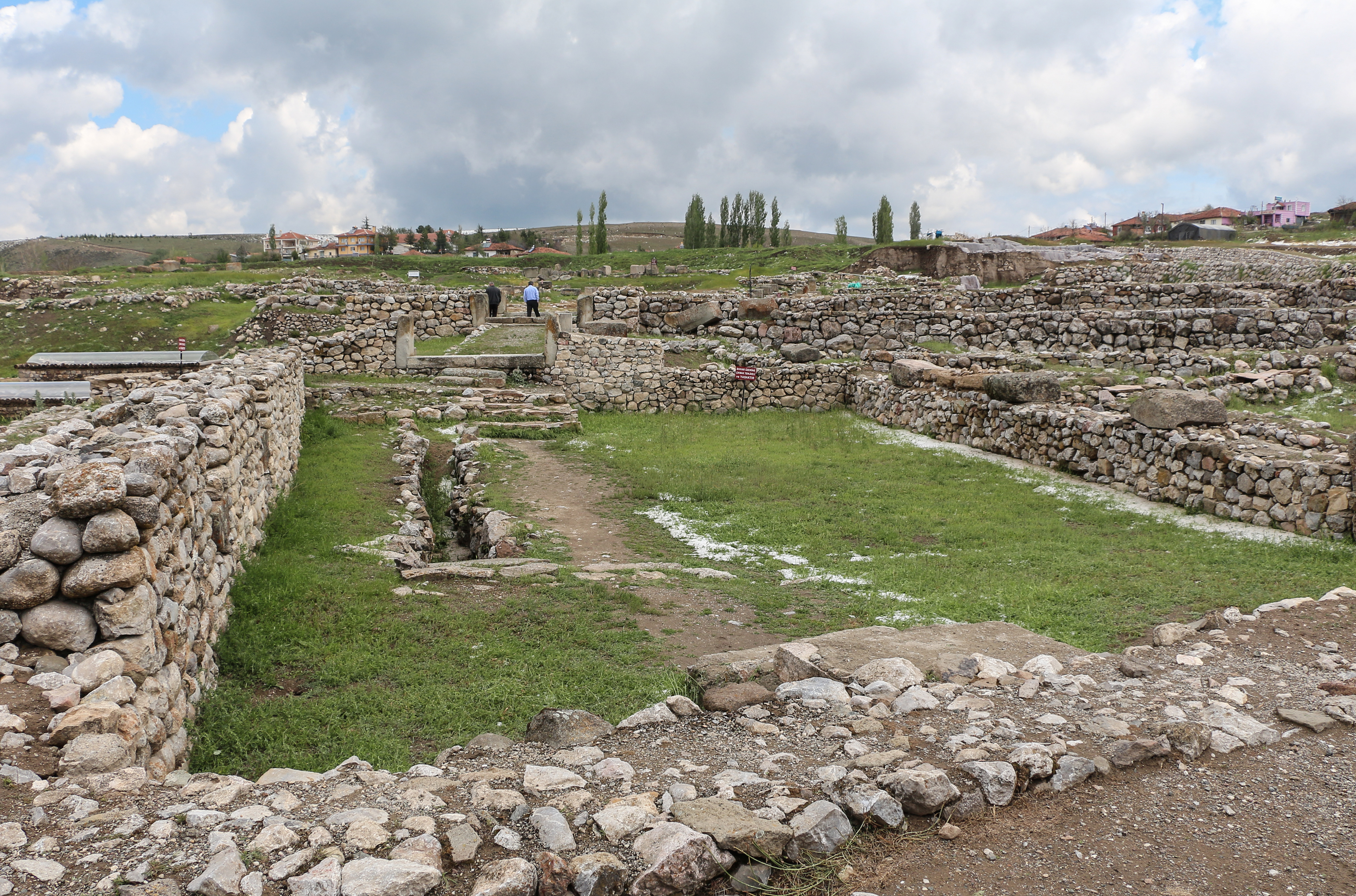
- Alaca Höyük

- Location within Turkey
- Coordinates: 40.1683°N 34.8425°E
- Country: Turkey
- Province: Çorum
- District: Alaca

Government
  - Mayor: Şerif Arslan (MHP)
- Population (2022): 19,510
- Time zone: UTC+3 (TRT)
- Area code: 0364
- Climate: Dsb
- Website: www.alaca.bel.tr

Alaca is a town in Çorum Province in the Black Sea region of Turkey. It is located 52 km (32 mi) from the city of Çorum, on a road from the Black Sea coast to central Anatolia. It is the administrative seat of Alaca District. Its population is 19,510 (2022).

The ancient Hittite settlement of Alaca Höyük is located in Alaca District.

== Demographics ==
=== Population ===
Year	Population
2022	19,510
2000	24,983
1990	20,646
1980	15,649
1970	9,674
1960	7,168
1950	3,843
1927	2,066
