= Sarakap =

Sarakap Սարակապ
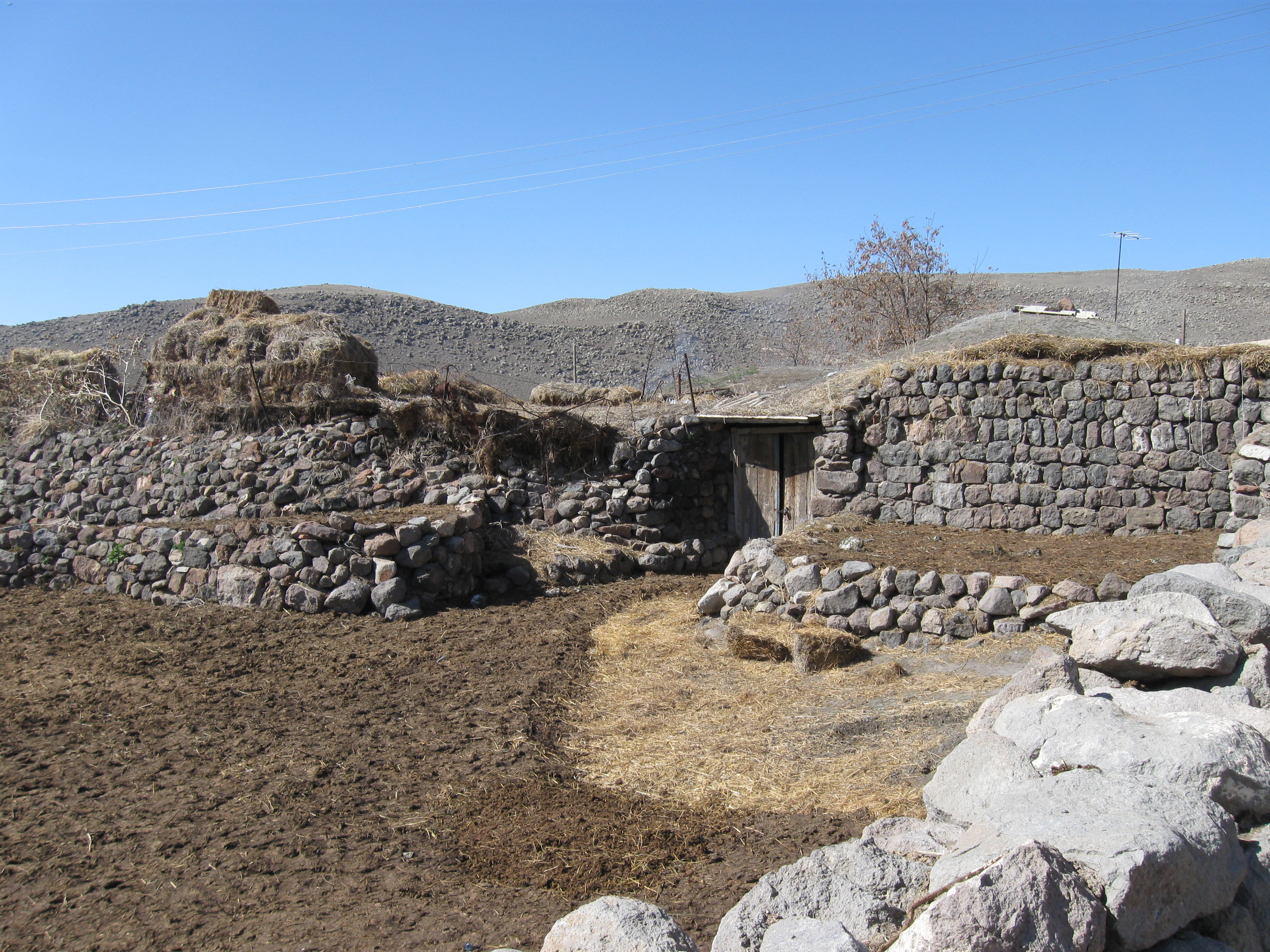

- Location within Armenia Location within Shirak
- Coordinates: 40°33′22″N 43°43′15″E
- Country: Armenia
- Province: Shirak
- Municipality: Ani

Population (2011)
  - Total: 517
- Time zone: UTC+4
  - Summer (DST): UTC+5

Sarakap (Armenian: Սարակապ) is a village in the Ani Municipality of the Shirak Province of Armenia.

== Demographics ==
Historical population
Year	Pop.	±% p.a.
1831	70	—
1897	937	+4.01%
1926	597	−1.54%
1931	762	+5.00%
1939	910	+2.24%
1959	686	−1.40%
1970	657	−0.39%
1979	649	−0.14%
1989	550	−1.64%
2001	591	+0.60%
2011	517	−1.33%
