= Ünalan station =

Station of the Istanbul Metro

Ünalan
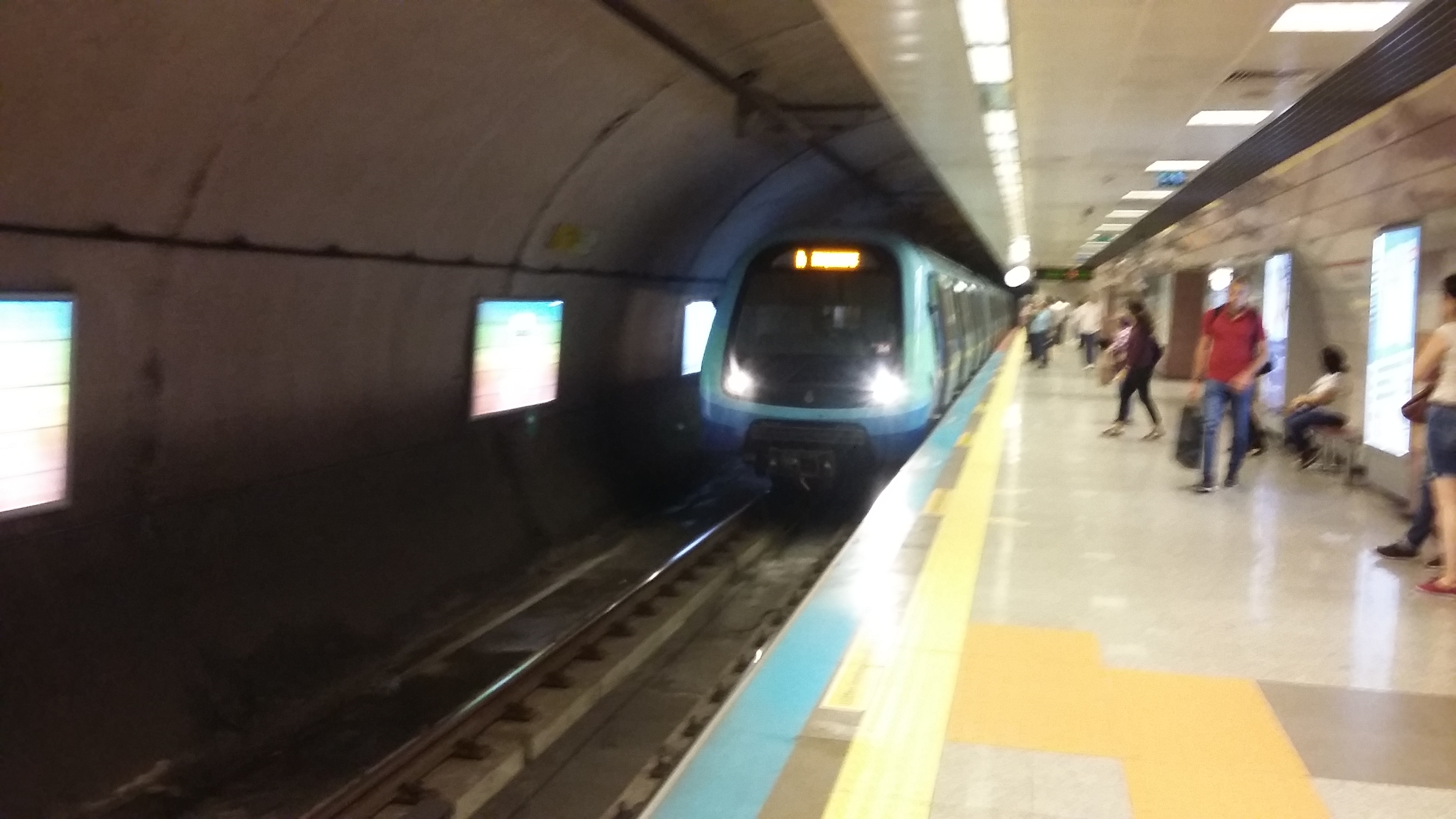

General information
- Location: Uzunçayır Kavşağı, Hasanpaşa Mah., 34722; Kadıköy
- Coordinates: 40.9974°N 29.0593°E
- System: Istanbul Metro rapid transit station
- Owner: Istanbul Metropolitan Municipality
- Operator: Istanbul Metro
- Line: M4
- Platforms: 1 island platform
- Tracks: 2
- Connections: Metrobus: 34A, 34G, 34Z, 34AS at Uzunçayır; İETT Bus: 3A, 11T, 130, 13M, 13Y, 14A, 14BK, 14DK, 15BK, 16A, 16, B, 16C, 16F, 16KH, 16M, 16S, 16U, 16Y, 16Z, 17K, 17P, 18A, 18E, 18K, 18M, 18Ü, 18V, 18Y, 19, 19A, 19B, 19E, 19FK, 19H, 19T, 19Z, 20E, 20Ü, 21B, 21C, 21G, 21K, 21U, 130A, 130Ş, 319, 320A, E-10, E-11; Istanbul Minibüs: Harem-Gebze, Kadıköy-Armağanevler, Kadıköy-Atakent, Kadıköy-Batı Ataşehir, Kadıköy-Bulgurlu, Kadıköy-Kartal, Kadıköy-Uğur Mumcu, Kadıköy-Yukarı Dudullu, Kadıköy-Özel Eyüboğlu Koleji, Üsküdar-Ataşehir, Üsküdar-Ferhatpaşa, Üsküdar-Kozyatağı

Construction
- Structure type: Underground
- Accessible: Yes

History
- Opened: 17 August 2012
- Electrified: 1,500 V DC Overhead line

Services
Preceding station	Istanbul Metro	Following station
Acıbadem towards Kadıköy	M4 Line	Göztepe towards Sabiha Gökçen Airport
Location

Ünalan is an underground station on the M4 line of the Istanbul Metro. Located beneath the Uzunçayır Interchange in the Hasanpaşa neighborhood of Kadıköy, Istanbul, it was opened on 17 August 2012. Connection to the Istanbul Metrobus is available from Ünalan.

== Station Layout ==
P Platform level	Westbound	← toward Kadıköy
P Platform level	Island platform, doors will open on the left
P Platform level	Eastbound	toward Sabiha Gökçen Airport →
