= Büyükcamili, Alaca =

Village in Turkey

Büyükcamili
- Village
- Location in Turkey
- Coordinates: 40.2511°N 34.8385°E
- Country: Turkey
- Province: Çorum
- District: Alaca
- Population (2022): 176
- Time zone: UTC+3 (TRT)

Büyükcamili is a village in the Alaca District of Çorum Province in Turkey. Its population is 176 (2022).
