= Laçın (disambiguation) =

Laçın may refer to:

- Lachin District, Azerbaijan
- Lachin (Hazara tribe)
- Lachin, capital of Lachin Rayon of Azerbaijan (de jure), capital of Qashatagh Province of Nagorno-Karabakh Republic(de facto).
- Laçın, Kalbajar, a village in the Kalbajar Rayon of Azerbaijan (de jure), a village in the Shahumian Province of Nagorno-Karabakh Republic(de facto).
- Laçın corridor

== See also ==
- Laçin, a district center in Çorum Province, Turkey
- Laçin (disambiguation)
