= Battle of Kırkdilim =

14th century battle between Ottoman sultan and ruler of northeastern Anatolia

- Part of the Ottoman wars in Asia
Date	1391 or 1392
Location	Kırkdilim, Çorum
Result	Kadi Burhan al-Din victory

Belligerents
Ottoman Empire	Domains of Kadi Burhan al-Din

Commanders and leaders
(Ottoman Empire) Ertuğrul Çelebi †	Kadi Burhan al-Din

Strength
Unknown	Unknown

The Battle of Kırkdilim was fought in July 1391 or 1392 (Note: On the issue of dating by various scholars, cf. Zachariadou 1980, p. 472 (note 9).) between the Ottoman Ertuğrul Çelebi son of Bayezid I, and Kadi Burhan al-Din, ruler of northeastern Anatolia. The details of the battle are debated: Burhan al-Din's court poet Ibn Ardashir presents Bayezid's campaign being ended by a major victory for his master, which temporarily halted Ottoman expansion in Anatolia, but the contemporary letters of Manuel II Palaiologos, who accompanied Bayezid on his Anatolian campaigns, contain no indications of a major clash, and point to the expedition having been an Ottoman success overall.

== Background ==
A map of the independent Turkic beyliks in Anatolia during the mid-14th century

Kadi Burhan al-Din, a learned Islamic jurist and poet, had risen to power under the latter-day Eretnid rulers of north-eastern Anatolia, before supplanting them altogether and declaring himself sultan at Sivas in 1381/82. During the same period, the nascent Ottoman Empire, under Murad I (r. 1362–1389), began its expansion from northwestern Anatolia into the central and eastern parts of the peninsula. This expansion was, in the words of historian Dimitris Kastritsis, "generally justified through marriage alliances and other diplomatic means."

Following Murad's death at the Battle of Kosovo, however, the Anatolian beyliks sensed an opportunity to restore their fortunes and formed an anti-Ottoman league under the Karamanid ruler Ala ad-Din Ali (r. 1361–1398): the Karamanids advanced up to Eskişehir, the Germiyanid ruler Yakub II restored his principality, and Burhan al-Din took Kırşehir. As a result, Murad's son and successor Bayezid I (r. 1389–1402) crossed the Dardanelles with his own forces, supported by the armies of the Jandarid Süleyman Pasha of Kastamonu and the Christian vassal states of the Balkans—mainly Serbia and the Byzantine Empire—and launched a campaign to "unify Anatolia under Ottoman rule". Much of the information about Bayezid's campaigns in 1390–1391 comes from the letters written by the Byzantine emperor Manuel II Palaiologos, who accompanied Bayezid as his vassal.

In 1390 the Ottoman sultan annexed the beyliks of western Anatolia: the beylik of Sarukhan was annexed, as were Menteshe and Aydın, whose rulers were allowed to retire to estates, while Yakub II of Germiyan was thrown in prison. Bayezid then moved to besiege the Karamanid capital of Konya. The Karamanids sent to Kadi Burhan al-Din for assistance, which induced Bayezid to abandon Konya and conclude a treaty leaving to the Karamanids the territories beyond the Çarşamba River. In the meantime, Bayezid's ally Süleyman Pasha had turned against him, fearing for his own fate, and concluded an alliance with Burhan al-Din. Bayezid quickly attacked and killed Süleyman Pasha, occupying Kastamonu shortly before 5 July 1391, while the eastern half of the Jandarid principality, around Sinop, was left free, as its ruler, İsfendiyar Bey, recognized Ottoman overlordship. This brought Bayezid in immediate contact with Burhan al-Din's domains. The ambitions of the two men now came into direct conflict: Bayezid now intended to march against Amasya, and thereby cut off Burhan al-Din's expansion to the Black Sea, while the latter had been preparing himself to capture the city by occupying various surrounding fortresses in the previous years. Amasya at the time was ruled by Ahmed, the son of the emir Hajji Shadgeldi Pasha, who had wrested it from the Eretnids.

== The Ottoman campaign and the clash with Burhan al-Din ==
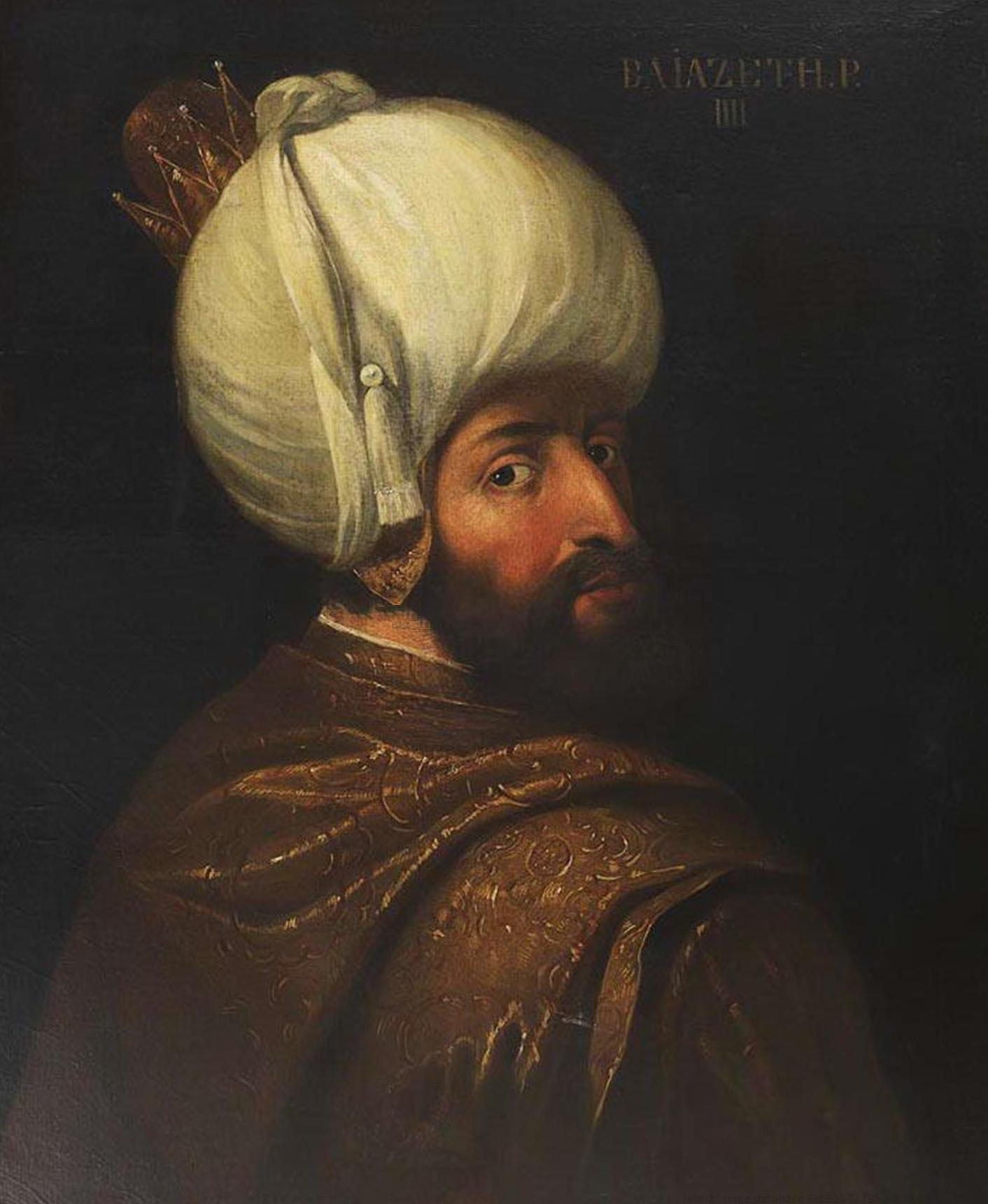
18th-century portrait of Sultan Bayezid

The main source of the events surrounding the battle is the Bazm u Razm, written by Aziz ibn Ardashir Astarabadi, one of Burhan al-Din's courtiers. Manuel II's letters provide additional information, particularly pertaining to the chronology of the campaign; traditionally, historiography placed the campaign in 1392, but Manuel did not participate in a campaign in 1392, and the historian Elisabeth Zachariadou has shown that Bayezid was likely campaigning in the northwestern Balkans in that year (see below).

Ibn Ardashir writes that Burhan al-Din initially marched to Süleyman Pasha's aid, but was still under way when news of the fall of Kastamonu and Süleyman Pasha's death reached him. He nevertheless continued to march towards the Ottoman army, which had reached Osmancık. Ibn Ardashir maintains that Bayezid sent for negotiations, but Burhan al-Din insisted first on the Ottomans leaving Osmancık, which he claimed. Manuel II corroborates this, writing that Bayezid only intended to force the submission of a chieftain called Peitzas, (Note: Peitzas (Πεϊτζᾶς) is probably a hellenized form of the Turkish name Begce. This person is otherwise unidentified among the local rulers. Zachariadou 1980, p. 477.) who ruled between Sinop and Samsun, as well as of İsfendiyar of Sinop, and frighten Burhan al-Din, "the man who rules Sebasteia with the Scythians". (Note: "Scythians" (Σκύθαι) is the anachronistic term typically used by the Byzantines of the period for the Mongols; Burhan al-Din ruled over a mixed Turcoman and Mongol population, and his state was a successor of the old Ilkhanate. Zachariadou 1980, pp. 475–476.)

While Ibn Ardashir maintains that Burhan al-Din marched to confront the Ottomans, Manuel II reports that the "once marvellous Scythians" retreated before the Ottoman advance; indeed, no enemy could be seen far and wide. The Ottomans ravaged the country at will. Although many inhabitants deserted their dwellings for the forests and mountains, Manuel was horrified by the slaughter accompanying the expedition, not only by the Turks, but furthermore by Bayezid's Serbian, Bulgarian, and Albanian vassals, who were eager to "avenge" their sufferings at the hands of the Ottomans on the Muslim population of Anatolia. The Ottoman army passed by Taşköprü and advanced east with the Kızılırmak River to its right, and faced great hardships as the autumn went into winter: already after mid-October Manuel writes of scarcity of food and disease striking the camp, while in his later letters he writes of "terrible famine and cold, the fording of rivers, the crossing of mountains too barren to sustain even wild beasts".

According to Ibn Ardashir, after capturing Osmancık, Bayezid was joined by Ahmed Bey of Amasya, Mahmud Çelebi and Kilic Arslan, the heirs to the Beylik of Tacettin that Burhan al-Din had occupied, the Taşanoğlu rulers of Merzifon, and other local chieftains. Even more flocked to Bayezid after the latter captured the fortress of Kırkdilim from its Kuvvaddaroğlu ruler, Saydi Mahmud. Manuel does not report these events, perhaps because the operation to capture Kırkdilim was not especially difficult. Ibn Ardashir in turn claims that Burhan al-Din took position on the plain of Çorumlu, from where he issued challenges to battle. The reinforcements he expected from the Turcoman tribes failed to materialize, and morale was low, but Burhan al-Din remained in place, and even defeated a detachment sent by Bayezid to win over the tribes. Although likely true, this victory may have been exaggerated by Ibn Ardashir, for Manuel reports that the Ottoman army continued its advance deep into the central Anatolian plateau, advancing beyond Ankara. According to Manuel, Bayezid was satisfied with his progress, and with the Byzantines' contributions, promising to reward them.

Ibn Ardashir asserts that following their earlier defeat, the Ottomans retreated to the mountains and remained passive, prompting Burhan al-Din to launch an assault. The two sides fought over three days outside the narrow pass where Bayezid and his army were encamped. Finally, Burhan al-Din broke through after obtaining information on the local topography, forcing the Ottomans to flee. Manuel on the other hand indicates that Bayezid led an expedition across the Kızılırmak to raid the territories lying beyond the river, and then returned to Ankara after it was over. According to Elisabeth Zachariadou, "the Ottomans did not flee, but merely withdrew after the raid. The situation never became critical for them since, Manuel implies, they pillaged the regions beyond the Kızılırmak without meeting any serious resistance and then finally withdrew to Ankara."

Bayezid then withdrew his army—Manuel II was back in Constantinople by early January—whereupon Burhan al-Din raided the regions of Iskilip, Ankara, Kalecık and Sivrihisar and laid siege to Amasya. As a result, Ahmed Bey surrendered the city to Bayezid, who installed his younger son Mehmed as its ruler.

== Aftermath ==
Bayezid planned to renew his expedition against Burhan al-Din in spring; Venetian informants reported that he planned to subdue Sinop, with Manuel II serving as the commander of the expedition's naval element. This moved the Republic to mobilize its own fleet, and attempt to form a Christian league against the Ottoman designs. In May, however, the King of Hungary, Sigismund, invaded Ottoman territories in the Balkans, and a series of isolated reports and documents suggest that Bayezid campaigned in Serbia during 1392. According to Zachariadou, this strongly suggests that Bayezid called off his Anatolian campaign of that year. In 1393, Bayezid himself visited Amasya, where he received the submission of the local Turcoman rulers: the Taşanoğlu of Merzifon, the Tacettinoğlu, and the ruler of Bafra. Following his defeat of the Crusade of Nicopolis in 1396, Bayezid turned once more to Anatolia, where he defeated and annexed Karaman in autumn 1397. In the next year he took Samsun and Canik; following Burhan al-Din's death, annexed his domains as well, and expanded across eastern Anatolia. Bayezid's conquests proved ephemeral, however: in the Battle of Ankara in 1402, he was defeated and captured by Timur, who restored the various Anatolian beyliks to their original rulers.

== Sources ==
- İnalcık, Halil (1960). "Bāyazīd". In Gibb, H. A. R.; Kramers, J. H.; Lévi-Provençal, E.; Schacht, J.; Lewis, B. & Pellat, Ch. (eds.). The Encyclopaedia of Islam, Second Edition. Volume I: A–B. Leiden: E. J. Brill. pp. 1117–1119. doi:10.1163/1573-3912_islam_SIM_1302. OCLC 495469456.
- Kastritsis, Dimitris (2007). The Sons of Bayezid: Empire Building and Representation in the Ottoman Civil War of 1402-13. BRILL. ISBN 978-90-04-15836-8.
- Rypka, J. (1960). "Burhãn al-Dīn". In Gibb, H. A. R.; Kramers, J. H.; Lévi-Provençal, E.; Schacht, J.; Lewis, B. & Pellat, Ch. (eds.). The Encyclopaedia of Islam, Second Edition. Volume I: A–B. Leiden: E. J. Brill. pp. 1327–1328. doi:10.1163/1573-3912_islam_SIM_1543. OCLC 495469456.
- Taeschner, Fr. [in German] (1960). "Amasya". In Gibb, H. A. R.; Kramers, J. H.; Lévi-Provençal, E.; Schacht, J.; Lewis, B. & Pellat, Ch. (eds.). The Encyclopaedia of Islam, Second Edition. Volume I: A–B. Leiden: E. J. Brill. pp. 431–432. doi:10.1163/1573-3912_islam_SIM_0583. OCLC 495469456.
- Zachariadou, Elizabeth A. (1980). "Manuel II Palaeologos on the Strife between Bāyezīd I and Ḳāḍī Burhān al-Dīn Aḥmad". Bulletin of the School of Oriental and African Studies, University of London. 43 (3): 471–481. doi:10.1017/S0041977X00137395. JSTOR 615736.
