= Laçin (disambiguation) =

Laçin is a town in Çorum Province, Turkey. It may also refer to:

Places in Turkey

- Laçin District, a district in Çorum Province
- Laçin, Eskişehir, a neighbourhood in Eskişehir Province
- Laçin, Devrekani, a village in Kastamonu Province

People

- Berna Laçin, Turkish actress

== See also ==
- Laçın (disambiguation)
