= Yeniyapan, Uğurludağ =

Village in Turkey

Yeniyapan
- Village
- Country: Turkey
- Province: Çorum
- District: Uğurludağ
- Population (2022): 226
- Time zone: UTC+3 (TRT)

Yeniyapan is a village in the Uğurludağ District of Çorum Province in Turkey. Its population is 226 (2022).

== Climate ==
The region experiences relatively cold and snowy winters, with temperatures often falling below freezing during December, January, and February, accompanied by frequent snow accumulation. Summers are mild to warm, with average temperatures ranging between 20–28 °C, and a moderate humidity level compared to the coastal areas.
