= Sazköy, Uğurludağ =

Village in Turkey

Sazköy
- Village
- Country: Turkey
- Province: Çorum
- District: Uğurludağ
- Population (2022): 233
- Time zone: UTC+3 (TRT)

Sazköy is a village in the Uğurludağ District of Çorum Province in Turkey. Its population is 233 (2022). The village is populated by Kurds.
