= Resuloğlu, Uğurludağ =

Village in Turkey

Resuloğlu
- Village
- Location in Turkey
- Coordinates: 40.4277°N 34.1927°E
- Country: Turkey
- Province: Çorum
- District: Uğurludağ
- Population (2022): 18
- Time zone: UTC+3 (TRT)

Resuloğlu is a village in the Uğurludağ District of Çorum Province in Turkey. Its population is 18 (2022). The village is populated by Kurds.
