= Karaevliya, Uğurludağ =

Village in Turkey

Karaevliya
- Village
- Location in Turkey
- Coordinates: 40°24′N 34°20′E
- Country: Turkey
- Province: Çorum
- District: Uğurludağ
- Population (2022): 105
- Time zone: UTC+3 (TRT)

Karaevliya is a village in the Uğurludağ District of Çorum Province in Turkey. Its population is 105 (2022).
