= Üçdam, Uğurludağ =

Village in Turkey

Üçdam
- Village
- Location in Turkey
- Coordinates: 40.505°N 34.3216°E
- Country: Turkey
- Province: Çorum
- District: Uğurludağ
- Population (2022): 172
- Time zone: UTC+3 (TRT)

Üçdam is a village in the Uğurludağ District of Çorum Province in Turkey. Its population is 172 (2022).
