= Gökçekaya =

Gökçekaya can refer to:

- Gökçekaya, Laçin
- Gökçekaya Dam
