= Eskiçeltek, Uğurludağ =

Village in Turkey

Eskiçeltek
- Village
- Location in Turkey
- Coordinates: 40°33′N 34°26′E
- Country: Turkey
- Province: Çorum
- District: Uğurludağ
- Population (2022): 446
- Time zone: UTC+3 (TRT)

Eskiçeltek is a village in the Uğurludağ District of Çorum Province in Turkey. Its population is 446 (2022).
