= Ambarcı, Uğurludağ =

Village in Turkey

Ambarcı
- Village
- Location in Turkey
- Coordinates: 40.5250°N 34.3873°E
- Country: Turkey
- Province: Çorum
- District: Uğurludağ
- Population (2022): 163
- Time zone: UTC+3 (TRT)

Ambarcı is a village in the Uğurludağ District of Çorum Province in Turkey. Its population is 163 (2022).
