= Çamlıca, Laçin =

Village in Turkey

Çamlıca
- Village
- Location in Turkey
- Coordinates: 40.7743°N 34.9510°E
- Country: Turkey
- Province: Çorum
- District: Laçin
- Population (2022): 549
- Time zone: UTC+3 (TRT)

Çamlıca is a village in the Laçin District of Çorum Province in Turkey. Its population is 549 (2022). Before the 2013 reorganisation, it was a town (belde).
