= Gökçeağaç, Uğurludağ =

Village in Turkey

Gökçeağaç
- Village
- Location in Turkey
- Coordinates: 40.479°N 34.458°E
- Country: Turkey
- Province: Çorum
- District: Uğurludağ
- Population (2022): 209
- Time zone: UTC+3 (TRT)

Gökçeağaç is a village in the Uğurludağ District of Çorum Province in Turkey. Its population is 209 (2022).
