= Sıtma, Laçin =

Village in Turkey

Sıtma
- Village
- Country: Turkey
- Province: Çorum
- District: Laçin
- Population (2022): 51
- Time zone: UTC+3 (TRT)

Sıtma is a village in the Laçin District of Çorum Province in Turkey. Its population is 51 (2022). The village is populated by Kurds.
