= İkizce, Laçin =

Village in Turkey

İkizce
- Village
- Location in Turkey
- Coordinates: 40.7685°N 34.9945°E
- Country: Turkey
- Province: Çorum
- District: Laçin
- Population (2022): 95
- Time zone: UTC+3 (TRT)

İkizce is a village in the Laçin District of Çorum Province in Turkey. Its population is 95 (2022).
