= Narlı, Laçin =

Village in Turkey

Narlı
- Village
- Country: Turkey
- Province: Çorum
- District: Laçin
- Population (2022): 593
- Time zone: UTC+3 (TRT)

Narlı is a village in the Laçin District of Çorum Province in Turkey. Its population is 593 (2022). Before the 2013 reorganisation, it was a town (belde).
