= Boztepe, Uğurludağ =

Village in Turkey

Boztepe
- Village
- Location in Turkey
- Coordinates: 40.4837°N 34.3840°E
- Country: Turkey
- Province: Çorum
- District: Uğurludağ
- Population (2022): 61
- Time zone: UTC+3 (TRT)

Boztepe is a village in the Uğurludağ District of Çorum Province in Turkey. Its population is 61 (2022).
