= Kapilikaya Rock Tomb =

Tomb in Turkey

- Laçin Kapılıkaya Kaya Mezarı (Turkish)
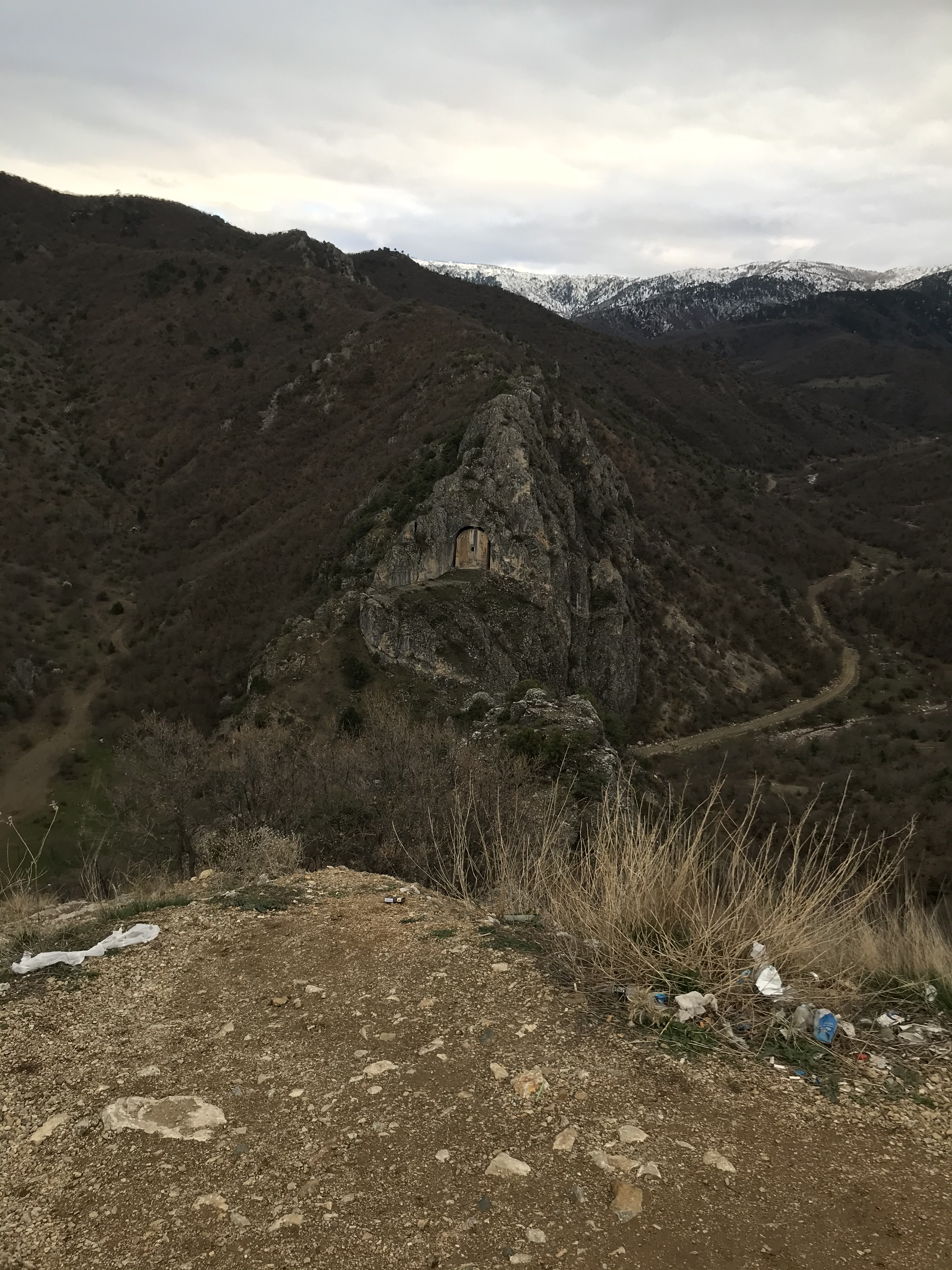
- Interactive map of Kapilikaya Rock Tomb
- 40°45′24″N 34°54′38″E
- Location: Laçin District, Turkey

History
- Built: circa 200-100 BCE

The Kapilikaya Rock Tomb is located between Laçin and Kırkdilim, 27 km north of Çorum, Turkey, on a rocky, steep and rough land formed by rift valleys cracked by river, on the north- west corner of a rock which extends to the north. A steep trail ascends the left side of a rocky outcropping, culminating in stairs before a tomb. Access to its inner chamber is through a small square opening halfway up.

It is a rock tomb of the Hellenistic period, dating back to the 2nd century B.C. The inscription "IKEZIOS" stands on the door of the tomb. The tomb is in a cube shape.
