= Kızağılı, Uğurludağ =

Village in Turkey

Kızağılı
- Village
- Location in Turkey
- Coordinates: 40°29′N 34°30′E
- Country: Turkey
- Province: Çorum
- District: Uğurludağ
- Population (2022): 172
- Time zone: UTC+3 (TRT)

Kızağılı is a village in the Uğurludağ District of Çorum Province in Turkey. Its population is 172 (2022).
