= Doğanlar, Laçin =

Village in Turkey

Doğanlar
- Village
- Location in Turkey
- Coordinates: 40.757°N 34.982°E
- Country: Turkey
- Province: Çorum
- District: Laçin
- Population (2022): 47
- Time zone: UTC+3 (TRT)

Doğanlar is a Circassian village in the Laçin District of Çorum Province in Turkey. Its population is 47 (2022).
