= Yeşilpınar =

Yeşilpınar may refer to:

- Yeşilpınar, Laçin, a village in the Laçin District of Çorum Province in Turkey.
- Yeşilpınar, Polateli, a village in the Polateli District, Kilis Province, Turkey
- Yeşilpınar, Varto, a village in the Varto District of the Muş Province in east Turkey
- Yeşilpınar (Istanbul Metro), an underground station of the Istanbul Metro
