= Aşılıarmut, Uğurludağ =

Village in Turkey

Aşılıarmut
- Village
- Location in Turkey
- Coordinates: 40°28′N 34°31′E
- Country: Turkey
- Province: Çorum
- District: Uğurludağ
- Population (2022): 295
- Time zone: UTC+3 (TRT)

Aşılıarmut is a village in the Uğurludağ District of Çorum Province in Turkey. Its population is 295 (2022).
