= Gökgözler, Laçin =

Village in Turkey

Gökgözler
- Village
- Location in Turkey
- Coordinates: 40°49′N 34°51′E
- Country: Turkey
- Province: Çorum
- District: Laçin
- Population (2022): 528
- Time zone: UTC+3 (TRT)

Gökgözler is a village in the Laçin District of Çorum Province in Turkey. Its population is 528 (2022).
