= Küçükerikli, Uğurludağ =

Village in Turkey

Küçükerikli
- Village
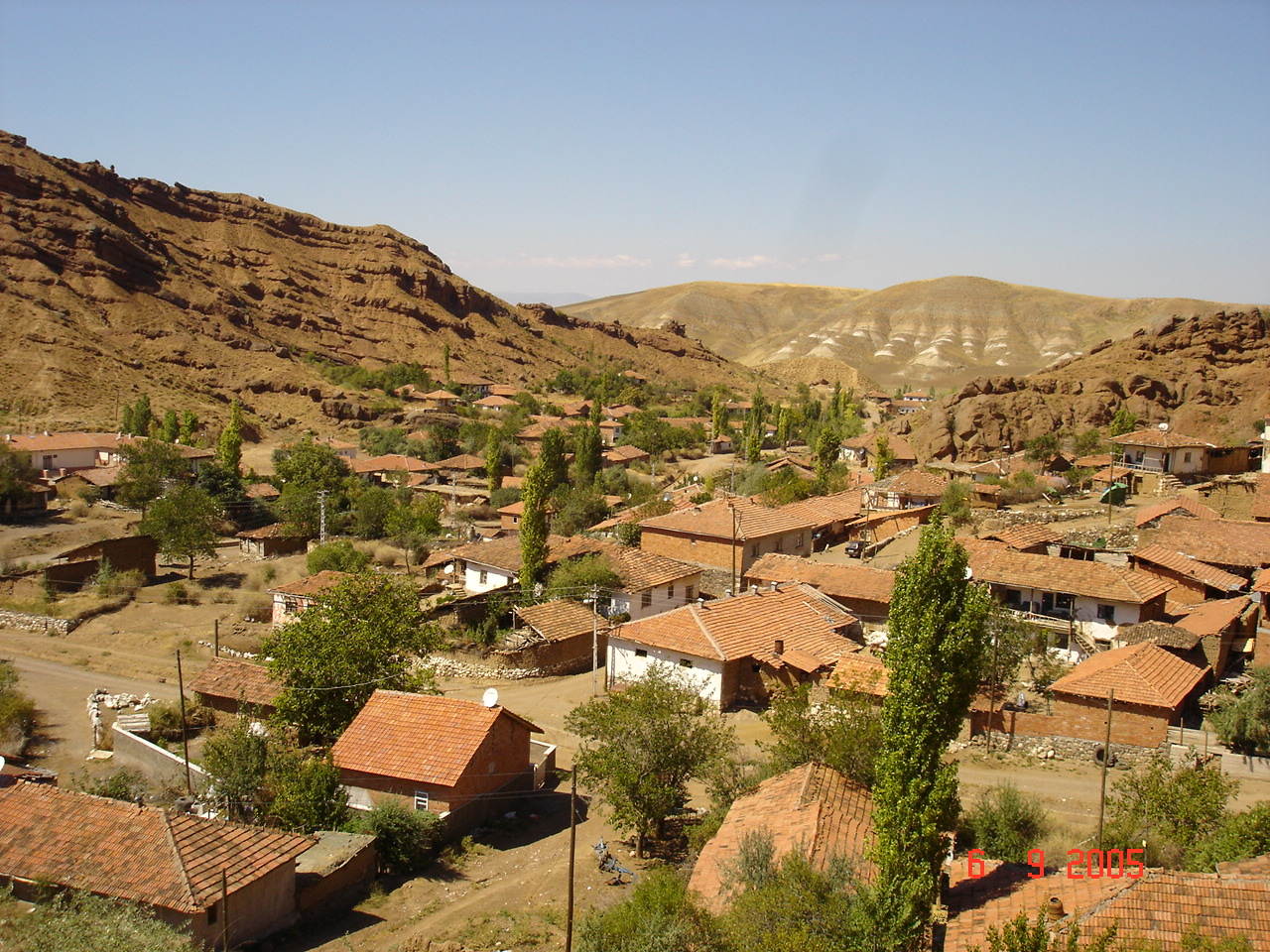

- Location within Turkey
- Coordinates: 40°26′N 34°23′E
- Country: Turkey
- Province: Çorum
- District: Uğurludağ
- Population (2022): 236
- Time zone: UTC+3 (TRT)

Küçükerikli is a village in the Uğurludağ District of Çorum Province in Turkey. Its population is 236 (2022).
