= Dağönü, Uğurludağ =

Village in Turkey

Dağönü
- Village
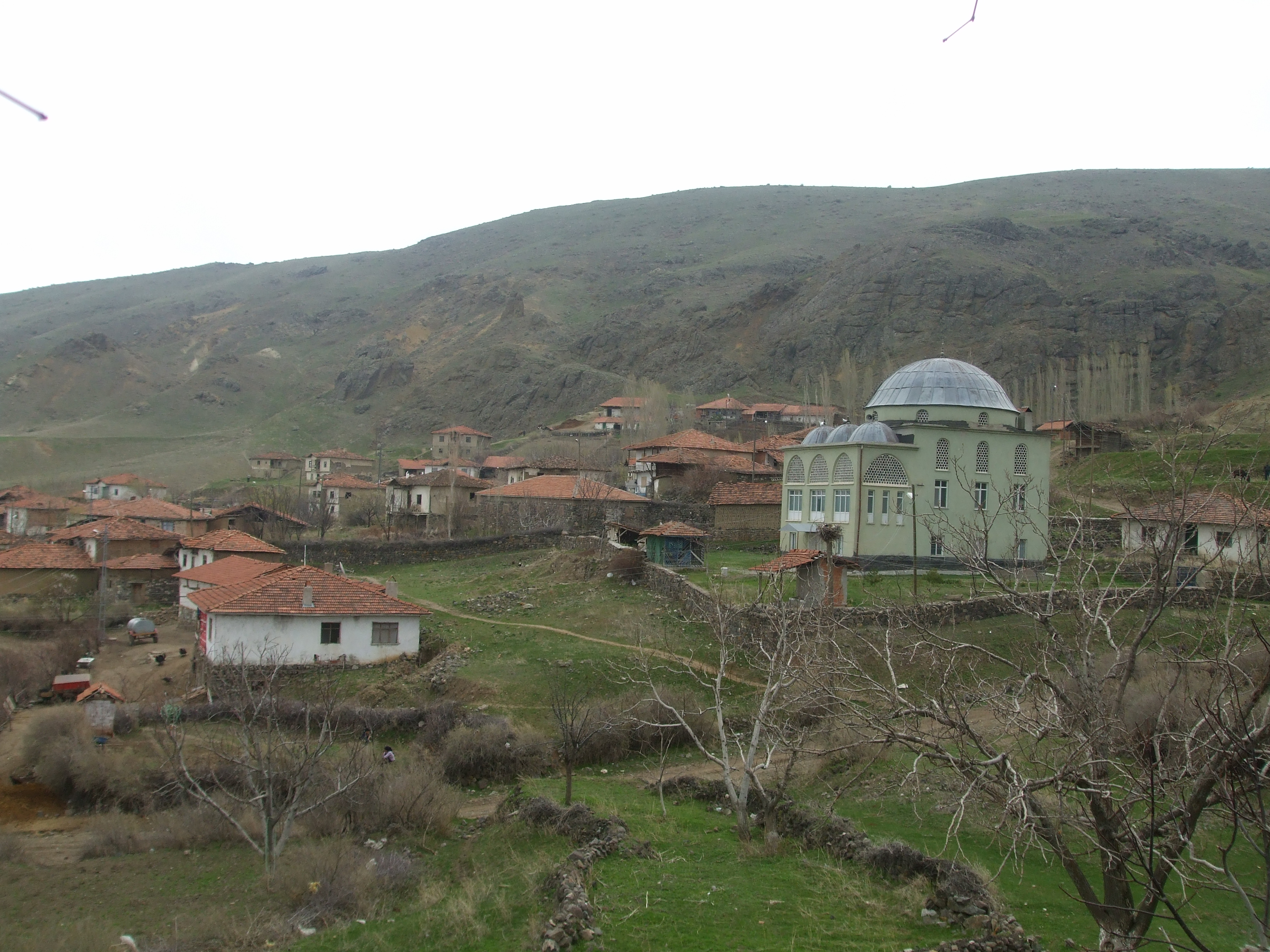

- Location within Turkey
- Coordinates: 40°29′14″N 34°29′25″E
- Country: Turkey
- Province: Çorum
- District: Uğurludağ
- Population (2022): 65
- Time zone: UTC+3 (TRT)

Dağönü is a village in the Uğurludağ District of Çorum Province in Turkey. Its population is 65 (2022).
