= Köpeç, Uğurludağ =

Village in Turkey

Köpeç
- Village
- Country: Turkey
- Province: Çorum
- District: Uğurludağ
- Population (2022): 23
- Time zone: UTC+3 (TRT)

Köpeç (also: Küpeç) is a village in the Uğurludağ District of Çorum Province in Turkey. Its population is 23 (2022).
