= Lallar =

- Municipality
- Location within Azerbaijan
- Coordinates: 39°12′N 48°18′E
- Country: Azerbaijan
- Rayon: Jalilabad

Population
  - Total: 513
- Time zone: UTC+4 (AZT)
  - Summer (DST): UTC+5 (AZT)

Lallar is a village and municipality in the Jalilabad Rayon of Azerbaijan. It has a population of 513.

== Notable natives ==
- Eldar Hasanov — National Hero of Azerbaijan.
