= Büyükerikli, Uğurludağ =

Village in Turkey

Büyükerikli
- Village
- Location in Turkey
- Coordinates: 40°25′N 34°22′E
- Country: Turkey
- Province: Çorum
- District: Uğurludağ
- Population (2022): 38
- Time zone: UTC+3 (TRT)

Büyükerikli is a village in the Uğurludağ District of Çorum Province in Turkey. Its population is 38 (2022).
