= Kavaklıçiftlik, Laçin =

Village in Turkey

Kavaklıçiftlik
- Village
- Location in Turkey
- Coordinates: 40°47′37″N 34°54′16″E
- Country: Turkey
- Province: Çorum
- District: Laçin
- Population (2022): 146
- Time zone: UTC+3 (TRT)

Kavaklıçiftlik is a village in the Laçin District of Çorum Province in Turkey. Its population is 146 (2022).
