= Torunlar =

Torunlar may refer to:

== Places ==
- Torunlar, Uğurludağ, village in the Uğurludağ District of Çorum Province in Turkey

== People with the surname ==
- Kutlu Torunlar (born 1968), Turkish windsurfer
