= Karakısık, Uğurludağ =

Village in Turkey

Karakısık
- Village
- Country: Turkey
- Province: Çorum
- District: Uğurludağ
- Population (2022): 78
- Time zone: UTC+3 (TRT)

Karakısık is a village in the Uğurludağ District of Çorum Province in Turkey. (2022).
