= Çamlıpınar, Laçin =

Village in Turkey

Çamlıpınar
- Village
- Location within Turkey
- Coordinates: 40.7499°N 34.9928°E
- Country: Turkey
- Province: Çorum
- District: Laçin
- Population (2022): 148
- Time zone: UTC+3 (TRT)

Çamlıpınar is a village in the Laçin District of Çorum Province in Turkey. Its population is 148 (2022). The village is populated by Kurds.
