= Kırköy, Uğurludağ =

Village in Turkey

Kırköy
- Village
- Location in Turkey
- Coordinates: 40.5472°N 34.4866°E
- Country: Turkey
- Province: Çorum
- District: Uğurludağ
- Population (2022): 250
- Time zone: UTC+3 (TRT)

Kırköy is a village in the Uğurludağ District of Çorum Province in Turkey. Its population is 250 (2022).
