= Gözübüyük, Laçin =

Village in Turkey

Gözübüyük
- Village
- Country: Turkey
- Province: Çorum
- District: Laçin
- Population (2022): 201
- Time zone: UTC+3 (TRT)

Gözübüyük is a village in the Laçin District of Çorum Province in Turkey. Its population is 201 (2022).
