= Karasoku, Laçin =

Village in Turkey

Karasoku
- Village
- Location in Turkey
- Coordinates: 40°45′2″N 35°00′22″E
- Country: Turkey
- Province: Çorum
- District: Laçin
- Population (2022): 98
- Time zone: UTC+3 (TRT)

Karasoku is a village in the Laçin District of Çorum Province in Turkey. Its population is 98 (2022). The village is populated by Kurds.
