= Uğurludağ =

- Municipality
- Location within Turkey
- Coordinates: 40°27′N 34°28′E
- Country: Turkey
- Province: Çorum
- District: Uğurludağ

Government
  - Mayor: Remzi Torun (MHP)
- Population (2022): 2,630
- Time zone: UTC+3 (TRT)
- Climate: Dsb
- Website: ugurludag.bel.tr

Uğurludağ is a town of Çorum Province in the Black Sea region of Turkey. It is located at 66 km from the city of Çorum. It is the seat of Uğurludağ District. Its population is 2,630 (2022). The mayor is Remzi Torun (MHP).

== Name ==
Formerly known as Kızılören, renamed Uğurludağ after Urlu Mountain which stands behind the town. The name means 'lucky mountain' and is traditionally a place of healing. Other than some caves said to inhabit healing spirits there is little of historical or archaeological interest. But the mountain scenery, with the snow on the peak even in summer, does attract visitors.

== Economy ==
Uğurludağ is a small market town in an agricultural district. The new generations are mostly migrating to larger cities in search of jobs and careers.

Uğurludağ was formerly within the district of İskilip and there is mutual dislike between the people of the two towns.
