= Governor of Çorum =

Governor of a Turkish Province

Governor of Çorum Çorum Valiliği
- Incumbent; Ali Çalgan since August 17, 2023
- Appointer: President of Turkey; On the recommendation of the Turkish government
- Term length: No set term length or limit
- Inaugural holder: Baha Bey; October 10, 1921
- Website: Office of the Governor

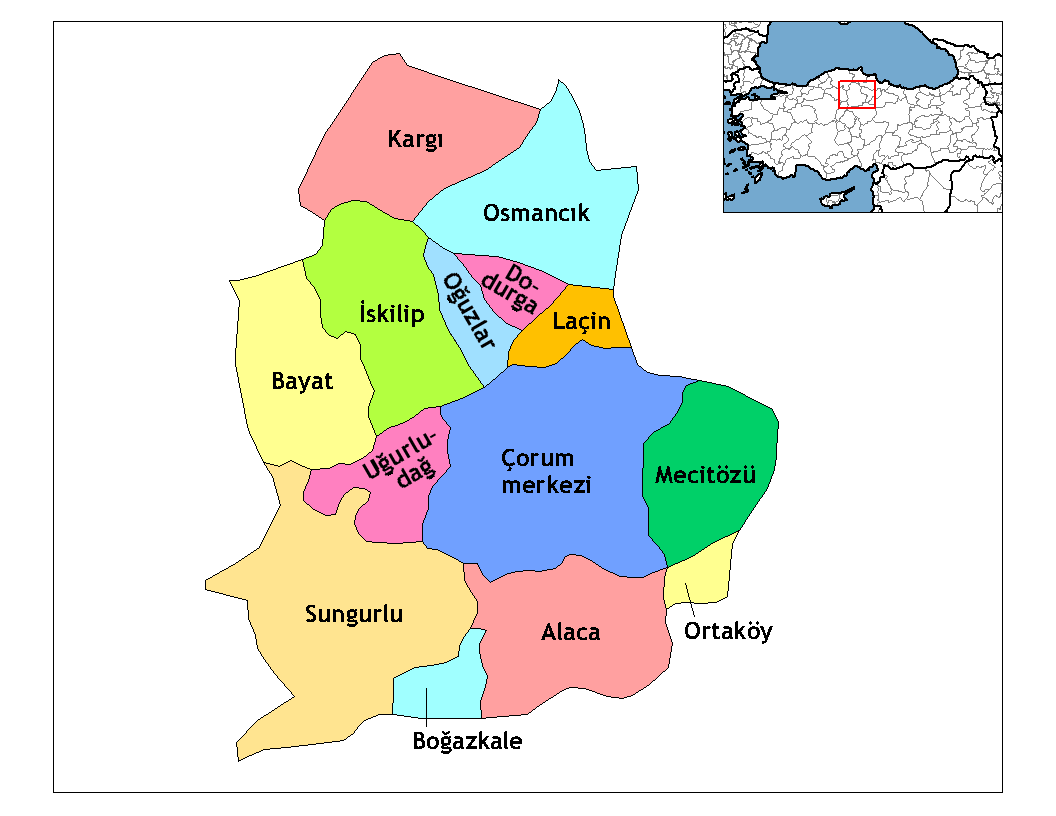
Map of the Province of Çorum, showing the provincial districts.

The Governor of Çorum (Turkish: Çorum Valiliği) is the civil service state official responsible for both national government and state affairs in the Province of Çorum. Similar to the Governors of the 80 other Provinces of Turkey, the Governor of Çorum is appointed by the Government of Turkey and is responsible for the implementation of government legislation within Çorum. The Governor is also the most senior commander of both the Çorum provincial police force and the Çorum Gendarmerie.

== Appointment ==
The Governor of Çorum is appointed by the President of Turkey, who confirms the appointment after recommendation from the Turkish Government. The Ministry of the Interior first considers and puts forward possible candidates for approval by the cabinet. The Governor of Çorum is therefore not a directly elected position and instead functions as the most senior civil servant in the province of Çorum.

=== Term limits ===
The Governor is not limited by any term limits and does not serve for a set length of time. Instead, the Governor serves at the pleasure of the Government, which can appoint or reposition the Governor whenever it sees fit. Such decisions are again made by the cabinet of Turkey. The Governor of Çorum, as a civil servant, may not have any close connections or prior experience in Çorum Province. It is not unusual for Governors to alternate between several different Provinces during their bureaucratic career.

== Functions ==
The Governor of Çorum has both bureaucratic functions and influence over local government. The main role of the Governor is to oversee the implementation of decisions by government ministries, constitutional requirements and legislation passed by Grand National Assembly within the provincial borders. The Governor also has the power to reassign, remove or appoint officials a certain number of public offices and has the right to alter the role of certain public institutions if they see fit. Governors are also the most senior public official within the province, meaning that they preside over any public ceremonies or provincial celebrations being held due to a national holiday. As the commander of the provincial police and Gendarmerie forces, the Governor can also take decisions designed to limit civil disobedience and preserve public order. Although mayors of municipalities and councillors are elected during local elections, the Governor has the right to re-organise or to inspect the proceedings of local government despite being an unelected position.

== List of governors of Çorum ==
- Baha Bey (1921–1923)
- Ahmet Cevdet Ertuğrul (1923–1926)
- Hasan Faiz Ergun (1926–1928)
- İsmail Adil Güven (1928–1929)
- A. Cemal Bardakçı (1929–1933)
- Arif Hikmet Aykaç (1933–1935)
- H. Haydar Berksun (1935–1936)
- Osman Nuri Tekeli (1936–1937)
- Süreyya Yurdakul (1937–1938)
- Ahmet Refik Noyan (1938–1939)
- Ziya Termen (1939–1941)
- Turgut Başkaya (1941–1944)
- Cemal Celal Tüzün (1944–1946)
- Eşref Erkut (1946–1949)
- Nuri Atay (1949–1950)
- Cahit Ortaç (1950–1951)
- Mehmet Hilmi İncesulu (1951–1953)
- Abdullah Zeki Köymen (1953)
- Rıfat Bingöl (1953–1955)
- Şakir Canalp (1955–1956)
- Alaettin Eriş (1956–1958)
- Cenap Aksu (1958–1960)
- Hikmet Baloğlu (1960–1962)
- Mehmet Saraçoğlu (1962–1966)
- Nail Memik (1966–1968)
- Mehmet Aldan (1968–1970)
- Ziya Dönmez (1970–1971)
- Süfyan Emiroğlu (1971–1975)
- Naci Gürcan (1975–1978)
- Kadir Demir (1978–1979)
- Mustafa Gönül (1979–1980)
- Fikret Koçak (1980–1981)
- Refik Arslan Öztürk (1981–1984)
- Arif Atilla Osmançelebioğlu (1984–1987)
- Kamil Demircioğlu (1987–1991)
- Şahabettin Harput (1991–1992)
- Mevlüt Çetinkaya (1992–1996)
- Zeki Şanal (1996–2003)
- Ali Haydar Öner (2003–2006)
- Mustafa Toprak (2006–2010)
- Nurullah Çakır (2010–2012)
- Sabri Başköy (2012–2014)
- Ahmet Kara (2014–2016)
- Necmeddin Kılıç (2016–2018)
- Mustafa Çiftçi (2018–2023)
- Doç. Dr. Zülkif Dağlı (2023–2024)
- Ali Çalgan (2024–)

== See also ==
- Governor (Turkey)
- Çorum Province
- Ministry of the Interior (Turkey)
