= İskilip dolması =

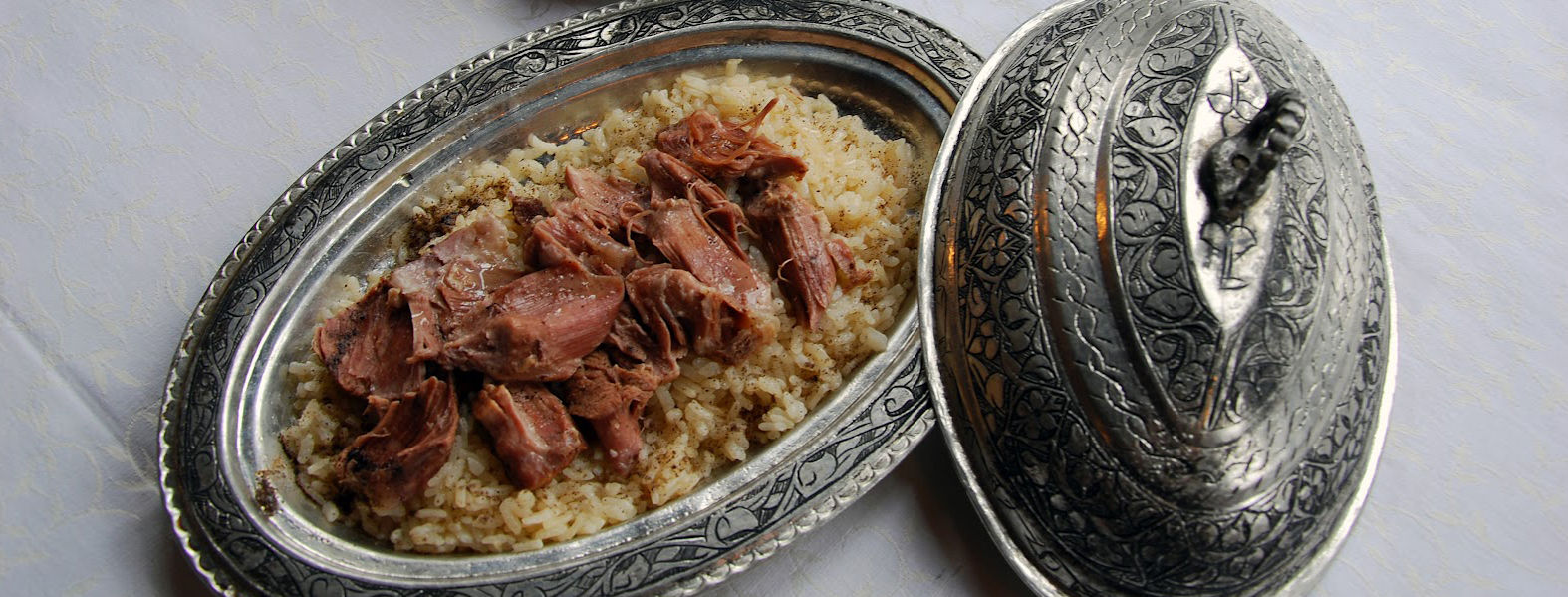
Iskilip dolmasi.jpg

Iskilip dolması is a Turkish dish of caramelized onions, rice and lamb that was traditionally cooked in a cloth bag in a large copper pot or cauldron. During the Ottoman period, this dish was prepared to feed the Ottoman army. The dish is a regional specialty of Çorum, where it is prepared in large quantities using traditional methods and is typically served at weddings. Though it is not a dolma, it is called a dolma because it shares some similar features with some of the stuffed dolma dishes.

Each pot of iskilip dolması includes 20 kilos of meat, 5 kilos of butter, 5 kilos of olive oil and 25 kilos of rice and can feed approximately 150 people. First the meat is added to the pot with some water. The rice is steam cooked over the broth in cloth bags. The pressure cooker pot is sealed with dough and left undisturbed to slow cook over a period of 12 hours. The meat broth is used to prepare a noodle soup that is traditionally served as an appetizer and flour helva made with milk is prepared as a dessert.

Some modern cooks have adapted the recipe for preparation in home kitchens. Onions are first sautéd in a large amount of butter until caramelized. Water is added to the pot and the mixture is brought to a boil. Pieces of meat are layered on the bottom of a very large cold pot and some of the hot butter mixture is poured over the meat. The rice is cooked in the butter mixture and is then steamed over the cooking meat in a cloth bag. The pot is sealed with dough, leaving only a small opening for the steam to escape. After a long period of slow cooking, the meat broth is poured over the rice. The meat is pulled apart and served over the rice.

== See also ==
- Dum biryani
