= Yeşilpınar, Laçin =

Village in Turkey

Yeşilpınar
- Village
- Country: Turkey
- Province: Çorum
- District: Laçin
- Population (2022): 54
- Time zone: UTC+3 (TRT)

Yeşilpınar (Adyghe: Касейхаблэ, romanized: Kaseyhablə) is a village in the Laçin District of Çorum Province in Turkey. Its population is 54 (2022).

== History ==
Yeşilpınar was founded in 1873 by several Circassian families led by Kaseyqo Talustan bey, whom had fled their homeland during the Circassian genocide. Because of this, the settlement was given the name Kaseyhable, literally meaning “Kasey’s town” in Circassian. The name of the village was recorded in Turkish as Karapınar Muhacir in 1928, the first word meaning “black spring” and the other being a term for Muslim refugees. Sometime after, the town was given the name “Yeşilpınar” which translates to “green spring”.

== Demographics ==
Yeşilpınar or Kaseyhable is inhabited by Circassians, most of whom are from the Abdzakh tribe.
