= Uğurludağ District =

District of Çorum Province, Turkey

- District
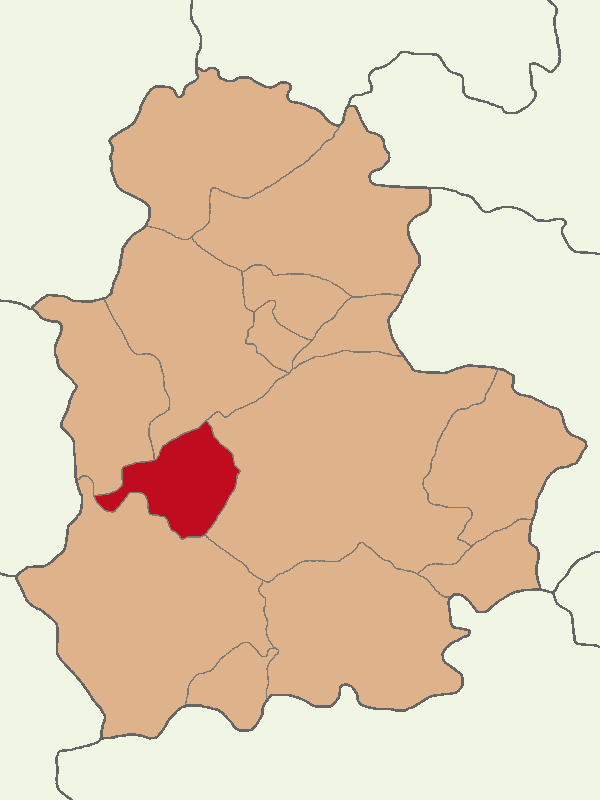
- Map showing Uğurludağ District in Çorum Province

- Location in Turkey
- Coordinates: 40°27′N 34°28′E
- Country: Turkey
- Province: Çorum
- Seat: Uğurludağ

Government
  - Kaymakam: Erkan Şahin
- Area: 428 km^{2} (165 sq mi)
- Population (2022): 5,765
  - Density: 13/km^{2} (35/sq mi)
- Time zone: UTC+3 (TRT)
- Website: www.ugurludag.gov.tr

Uğurludağ District is a district of the Çorum Province of Turkey. Its seat is the town of Uğurludağ. Its area is 428 km^{2}, and its population is 5,765 (2022).

== Composition ==
There is one municipality in Uğurludağ District:

- Uğurludağ

There are 20 villages in Uğurludağ District:

- Ambarcı
- Aşılıarmut
- Belkavak
- Boztepe
- Büyükerikli
- Dağönü
- Eskiçeltek
- Gökçeağaç
- Karaevliya
- Karakısık
- Kırköy
- Kızağılı
- Köpeç
- Küçükerikli
- Resuloğlu
- Sazköy
- Torunlar
- Üçdam
- Yarımca
- Yeniyapan
