= Torunlar, Uğurludağ =

Village in Turkey

Coordinates: 40.4755°N 34.4744°E

Torunlar
- Village
- Location in Turkey
- Coordinates
- Country: Turkey
- Province: Çorum
- District: Uğurludağ
- Population (2022): 89
- Time zone: UTC+3 (TRT)

Torunlar is a village in the Uğurludağ District of Çorum Province in Turkey. Its population is 89 (2022).
