= Laçın, Kalbajar =

Laçın
- Location within Azerbaijan Location within East Zangezur Economic Region
- Coordinates: 40°07′39″N 46°15′13″E
- Country: Azerbaijan
- Rayon: Kalbajar
- Time zone: UTC+4 (AZT)
  - Summer (DST): UTC+5 (AZT)

Laçın (Lachin) is a village in the Kalbajar District of Azerbaijan.

== Notable people ==
- Eldar Hasanov
