= Lachin (Hazara tribe) =

Hazara tribe

Lachin (Note: Hazaragi: لاچین) or Alchin (Note: Hazaragi: الچین) is one of the ancient tribes of the Hazara people living around Balkh, Balkhab and Sangcharak.

== Name ==
The word Lachin (Lachin) is a Turkic word meaning "falcon" (a bird of prey). This name is also mentioned in ethnographic and historical sources of Afghanistan as the name of a Hazara tribe.

== Notables ==
- Amir Khusrau
