= Çarşamba River =

River in Konya Province, Turkey

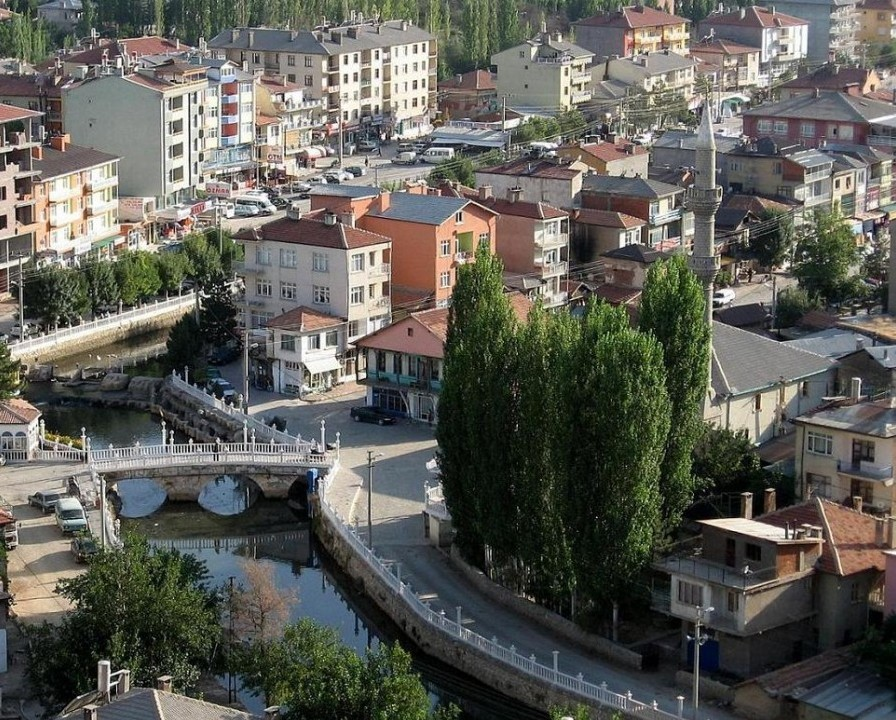
- Çarşamba River, passing through Bozkır town
- Native name: Çarşamba Çayı (Turkish)

Location
- Country: Turkey
- Province: Konya Province

Physical characteristics
- Source
  - location: Geyik Mountains
- Discharge
  - average: 285 m^{3}/s (10,100 cu ft/s)

Basin features
- Progression: Hotamış Marsh (in summer)

Çarşamba River (Turkish: Çarşamba Çayı) is a river in Konya Province in Turkey. The river begins at Karacahisar village in Bozkır district and merges with the canal from Lake Beyşehir in Blue Gorge (Mavi Boğaz). The river diverges into distributaries in Çumra district and ends up in the swamps near Karakaya village in Karatay district. The river is dammed by Apa Dam. The river is 105 km long and it is considered vital for agricultural irrigation in Konya Province.

== Location ==
The river originates from karst spring formations in the north and east slopes of Haydar Mountain, Gül Mountain and Akdağ in Geyik Mountains. Çarşamba Spring (Çarşamba Suyu) merges with Kozlu and Toplar creeks in Aygır Gediği (Sugözü) near Karacahisar village. The river passes first through Çağlayan village, then from Bozkır town. After that, many streams join the river; notably Söğüt Deresi, Kuruçay, Çökelez Deresi and Kaya Pınarı. Most of those tributaries are intermittent and dry in the summer. Çarşamba flows northeast and merges with Beyşehir Canal (Beyşehir Kanalı) in Suçatı locality near Pınarcık village, which drains the outflows of Lake Beyşehir and Lake Suğla. The river passes Blue Gorge before draining into Apa Dam. After the dam, the river passes through Dineksaray village and Çumra town. This 65 km-long stream is the main tributary of Çarşamba River.

Second tributary of the Çarşamba River is 105 km-long Beyşehir Canal. Formerly, the outflows of Lake Beyşehir used to flow into Lake Suğla, and then to Çarşamba River. The canal was constructed between 1908 and 1914, bypassing Lake Suğla. An additional, much shorter canal from Lake Suğla also joins to the canal. They join the main tributary in Suçatı.

The river often causes inundations during rainy periods. Such water is stored in the dam, to be used in the irrigation. Before the dam was constructed, the river had reached to the marshes in Karakaya village and ended there.

Blue Gorge is a 35 km-long water gap, connecting Çumra Plain and Suğla Lake basin. The gorge cuts through steep limestones and it is around 20 meters at its narrowest point. Where it is wider, the villagers use the land for orchards. The water from Blue Tunnel Project joins the river at the gorge via the regulator in Kuşça village, and gets stored in Apa Dam.

== Discharge and floods ==
The upstream basin of Çarşamba River is characterised with Mediterranean type precipitation pattern. Maximum rain falls in winter, especially during December. Flow pattern of the river is intermittent. The yearly average in Pınarcık station is 2.88 m^{3}/second.

The river's flowrate was recorded in Sorkun station as 36 m^{3}/second in 1986, 38.2 m^{3}/second in 2004, and 24.6 m^{3}/second in 2009; however a flood did not occur. The flowrate of over 60.8 m^{3}/second had caused a flood on 15 December 2010. Historically, there was another flood that happened on 10 June 1904, severely damaging Bozkır.

== Irrigation ==
Waters from the river irrigate Konya and Çumra plains; however it reaches much further during winter, up to Hotamış Marsh. There the waters form a 60 km^{2} lake. Hotamış Marsh dries up in the summer as a result of reduced upstream flow.

== Gallery ==
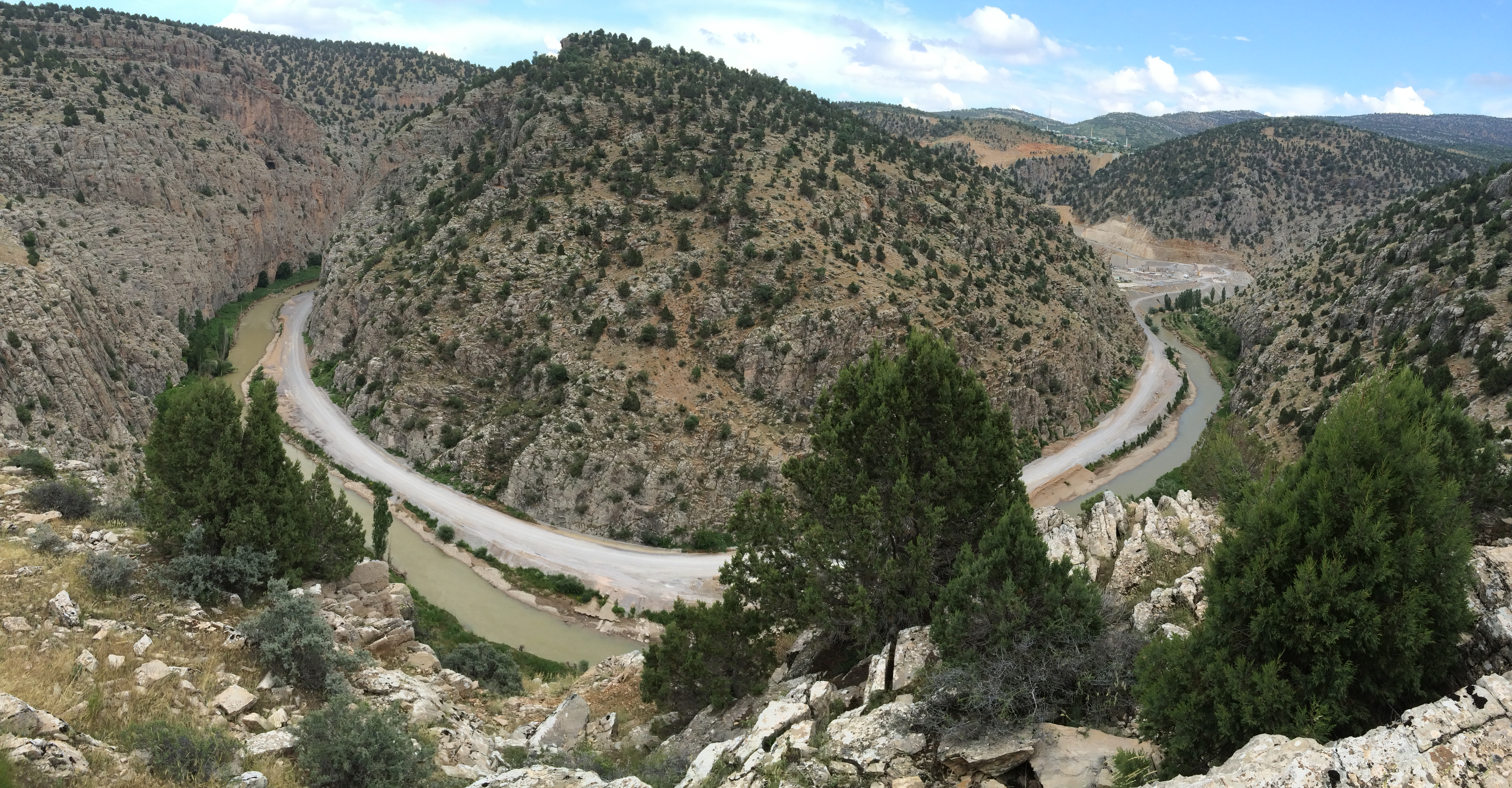
The river's curve, north of Kuşca village

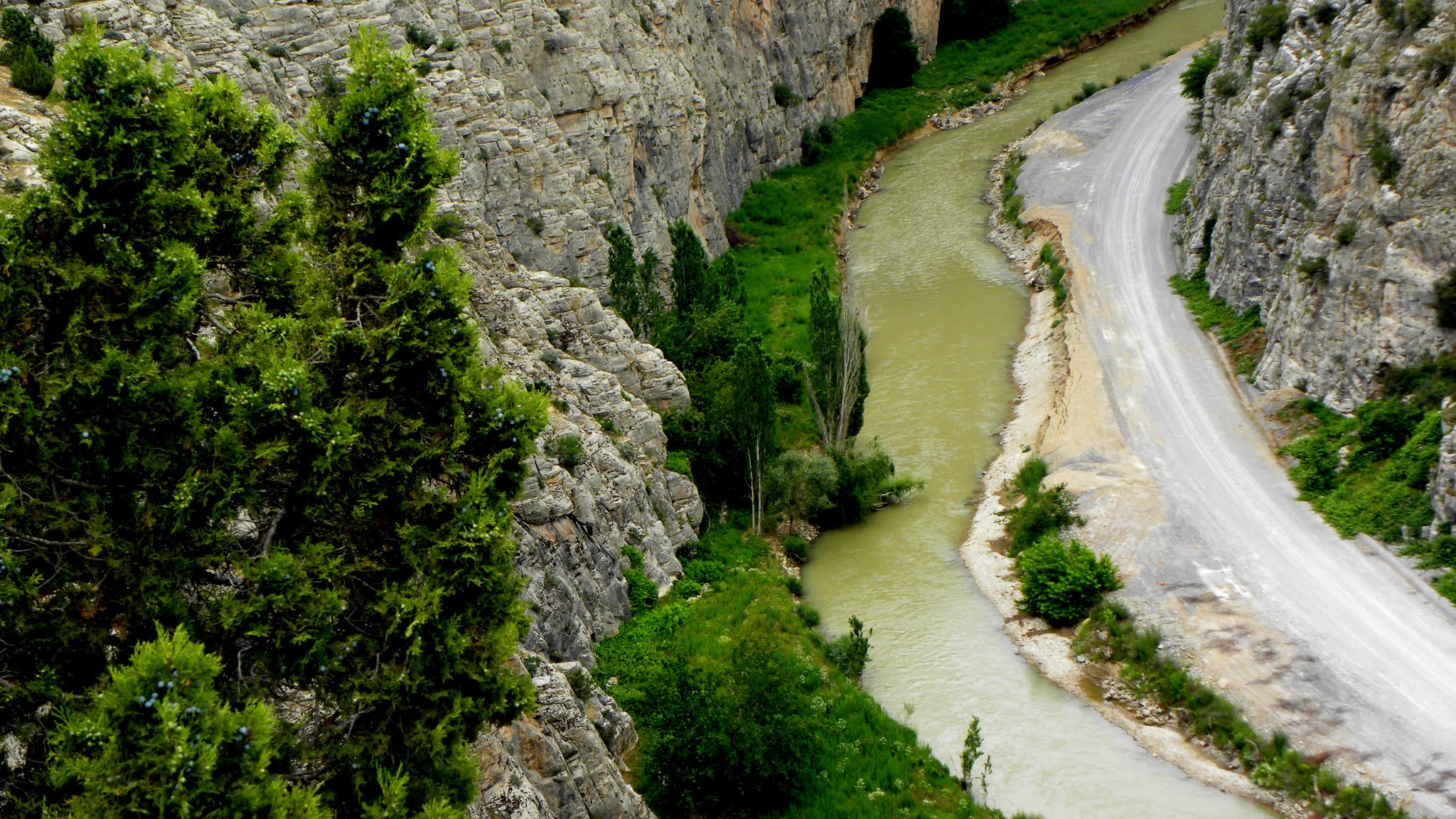
Blue Gorge, from Avdan ramp
