= Eldar Hasanov =

Azerbaijani diplomat (born 1955)

- Eldar Həsənov

Personal details
- Born: Eldar Humbat oglu Hasanov; 10 October 1955 (age 71) Laçın, Kalbajar District, Azerbaijan SSR, Soviet Union
- Occupation: Diplomat, politician

Eldar Hasanov (born October 10, 1955 in Laçın) is an Azerbaijani former Prosecutor General and diplomat who served as the Ambassador Extraordinary and Plenipotentiary of Azerbaijan to Serbia, Montenegro, and Bosnia and Herzegovina from 2010 to 2020.

== Corruption scandal ==
Hasanov was recalled from his diplomatic mission in Montenegro, Bosnia and Herzegovina in 2020 by a presidential decree issued by Ilham Aliyev following allegation of corruption against him. After his return home, he was arrested and detained by the operatives of the State Security Service on August 13, 2020. He was subsequently charged at the Baku Court for Serious Crimes with multiple offenses, including misappropriation of funds, money laundering, abuse of office, misuse of budget resources, and official forgery under the Criminal Code. After the investigation concluded, the case was transferred to the Court for Serious Criminal Cases. Hasanov was accused of embezzling public funds amounting to 28.3 million euros (US$33.14 million). He was sentenced to 10 years in prison.
