= Laçin =

- Municipality
- Location within Turkey
- Coordinates: 40°46′N 34°53′E
- Country: Turkey
- Province: Çorum
- District: Laçin

Government
  - Mayor: İdris Görükmez (AKP)
- Population (2022): 1,291
- Time zone: UTC+3 (TRT)
- Area code: 0364
- Climate: Csb
- Website: www.lacin.bel.tr

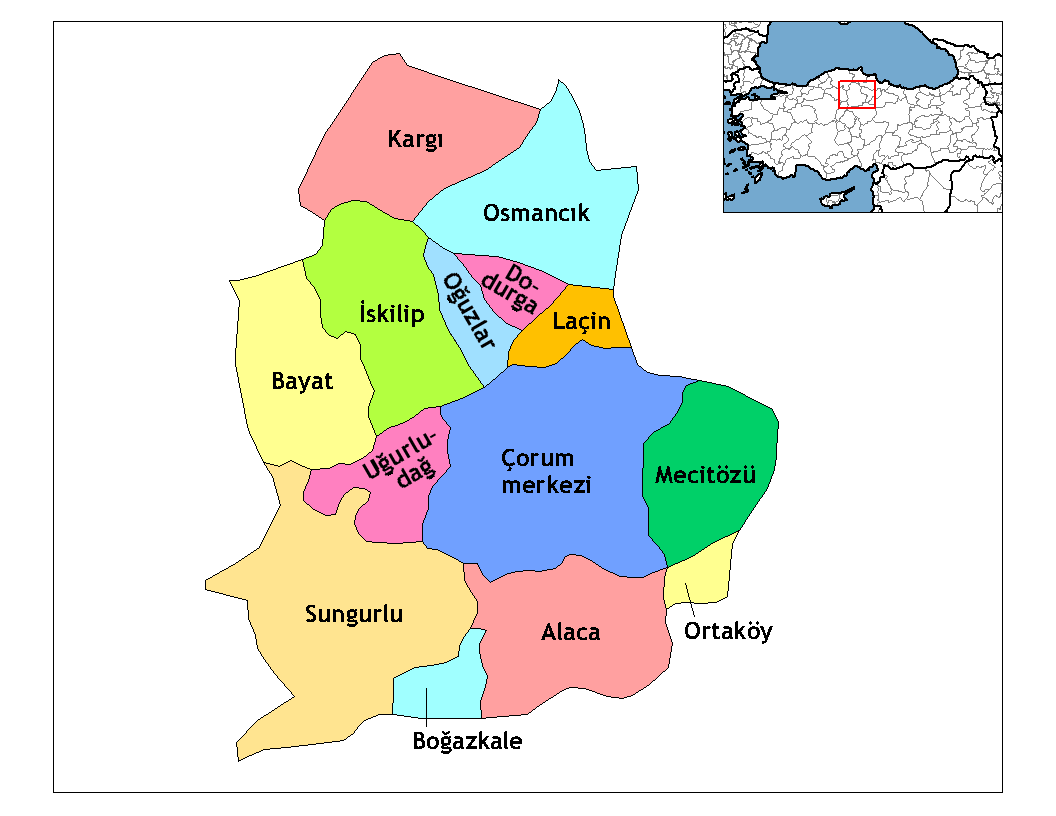
Map of Districts of Çorum, including Laçin

Laçin is a town in Çorum Province in the Black Sea region of Turkey. It is located at 29 km from the city of Çorum. It is the seat of Laçin District. Its population is 1,291 (2022). The mayor is İdris Görükmez (AKP).

== Geography ==
The climate has features of both the dry Central Anatolian plain and the Black Sea coast; winters are cold, summers are hot and dry, with most rainfall in spring. The district is partially mountainous and wooded. Being so close to the city of Çorum the district has little economic strength of its own; people live on growing grains, chickpeas and other crops.

The town of Laçin provides the district with high schools, a hospital and other basic amenities.

== See also ==
- Kapilikaya Rock Tomb
