= Laçin District =

District of Çorum Province, Turkey

- District
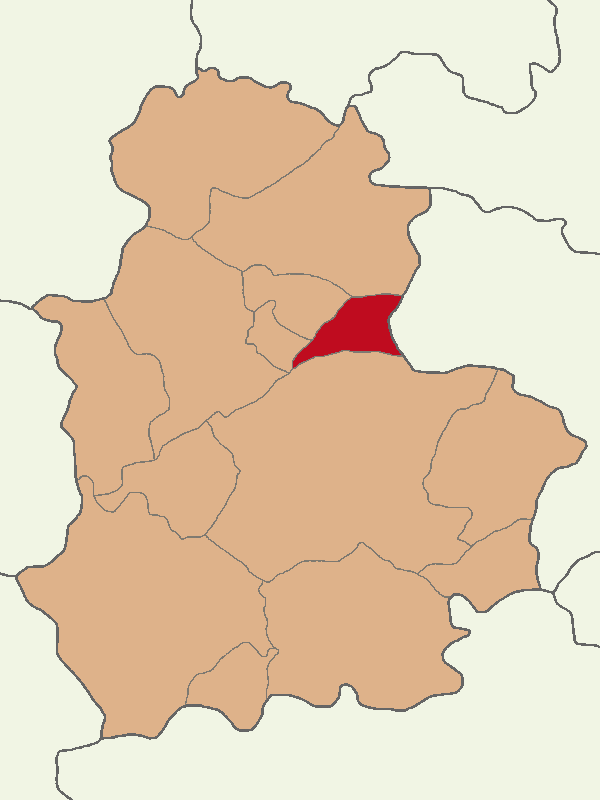
- Map showing Laçin District in Çorum Province

- Location in Turkey
- Coordinates: 40°46′N 34°53′E
- Country: Turkey
- Province: Çorum
- Seat: Laçin

Government
  - Kaymakam: Murat Yeşilyurt
- Area: 196 km^{2} (76 sq mi)
- Population (2022): 4,211
  - Density: 21.5/km^{2} (55.6/sq mi)
- Time zone: UTC+3 (TRT)
- Website: www.lacin.gov.tr

Laçin District is a district of the Çorum Province of Turkey. Its seat is the town of Laçin. Its area is 196 km^{2}, and its population is 4,211 (2022).

== Composition ==
There is one municipality in Laçin District:

- Laçin

There are 14 villages in Laçin District:

- Çamlıca
- Çamlıpınar
- Doğanlar
- Gökçekaya
- Gökgözler
- Gözübüyük
- İkizce
- Karasoku
- Kavaklıçiftlik
- Kuyumcu
- Mescitli
- Narlı
- Sıtma
- Yeşilpınar
