= Çorum Province =

Province of Turkey

Coordinates: 40°33′52″N 34°39′50″E

- Province
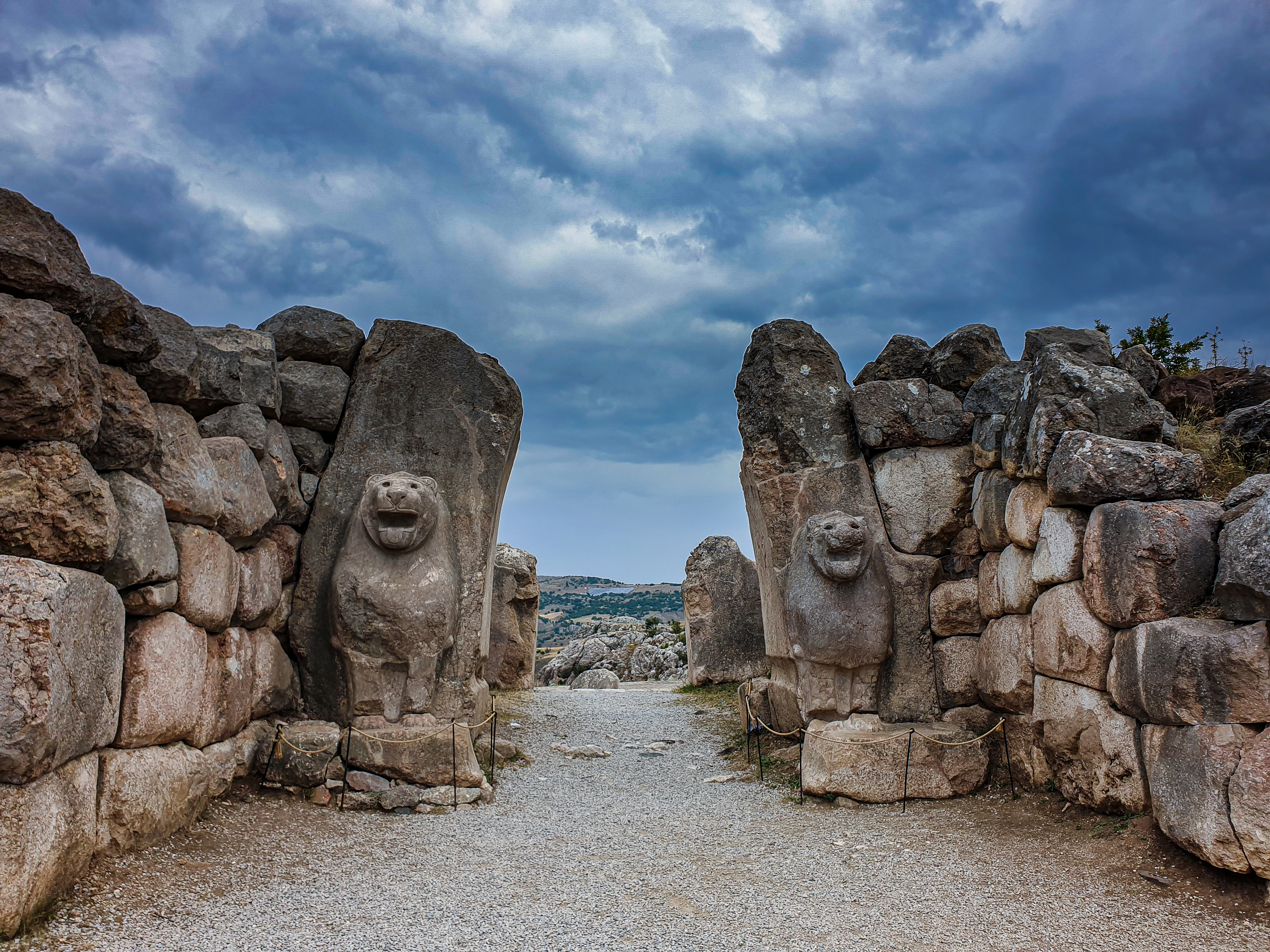
- Lion Gate in Hattusa

- Location of the province within Turkey
- Country: Turkey
- Seat: Çorum

Government
  - Governor: Ali Çalgan
- Area: 12,428 km^{2} (4,798 sq mi)
- Population (2022): 524,130
  - Density: 42.173/km^{2} (109.23/sq mi)
- Time zone: UTC+3 (TRT)
- Area code: 0364
- Website: www.corum.gov.tr

Çorum Province (Turkish: Çorum İli) is a province in the Black Sea Region of Turkey, but lying inland and having more characteristics of Central Anatolia than the Black Sea coast. Its area is 12,428 km^{2}, and its population is 524,130 (2022). Its provincial capital is the city of Çorum, the traffic code is 19.

== History ==
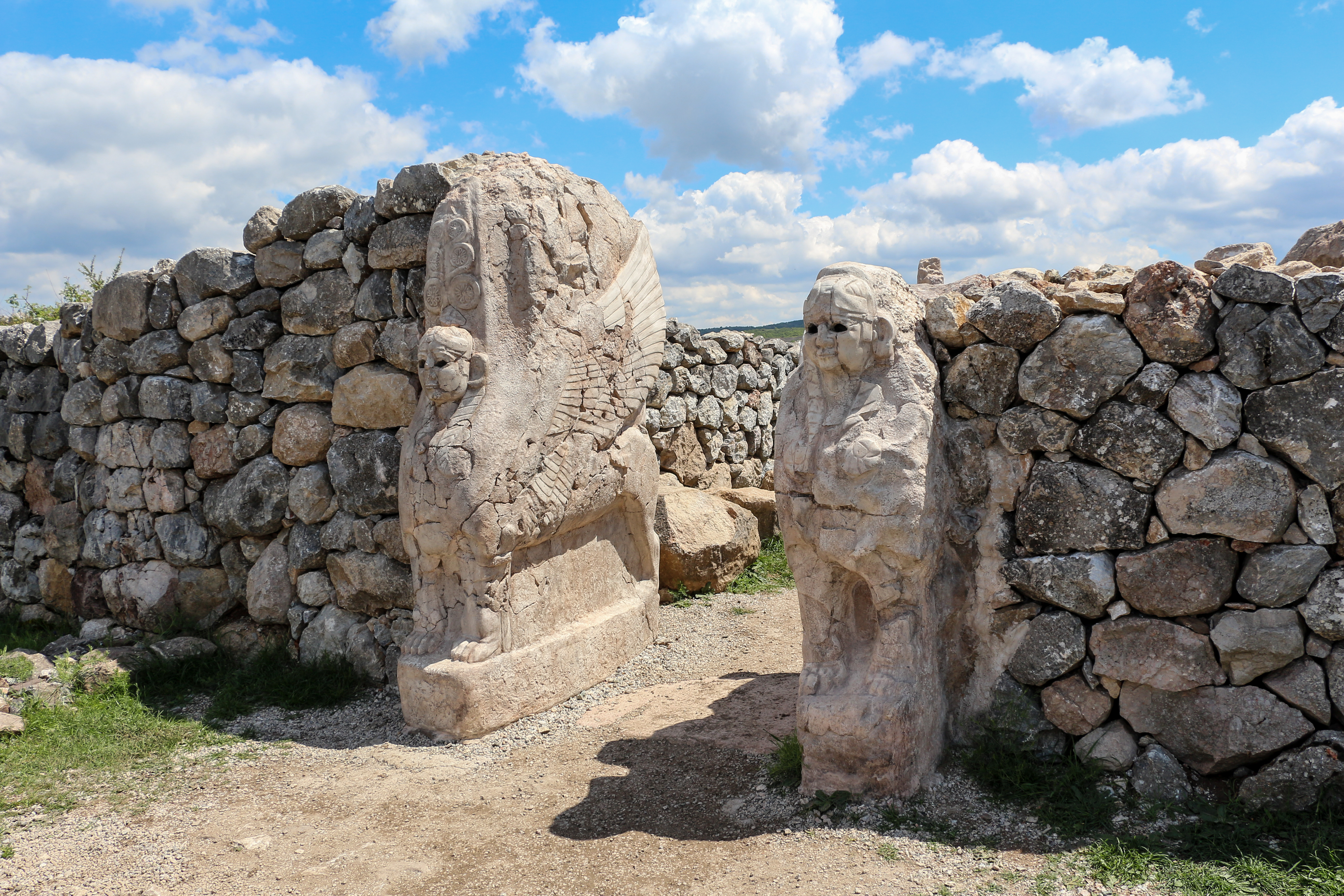
The Sphinx Gate at Hattusa. This was one of the city gates. The arc is typical for Hittite architecture.

Excavations reveal that the Çorum area was inhabited during the Paleolithic, Neolithic period and the 4th stage of the Calcolithic Age. Remains of these periods have been found at Büyük Güllüce, Eskiyapar and Kuşsaray.

In later times Çorum and its environs were dominated by Hittites and in the district of Boğazkale is one of the most important Hittite sites in Anatolia, the UNESCO World Heritage listed Hattusa, the capital of the Hittite Empire from 1700 BC to 1200 BC. Other important Hittite sites include the open-air temples at Yazılıkaya and Alacahöyük; royal tombs; and the excavations of Boğazköy including tablets proving tradings links between the Hittites and the Ancient Egyptians.

Later civilizations such as the Phrygians arrived here who left remains at Pazarlı, north of Çorum. Besides the Phrygians, the Cimmerians, Medes, Persians, Galatians, Romans, Byzantines, Seljuk Turks, Danishmends, Mongol Empire (Ilkhanids), Eretnids, Kadi Burhan al-Din and finally the Ottoman Empire also arrived here. As well as the Hittite archaeology, the province also contains a number of castles, bridges and mosques dating from the Seljuk and Ottoman periods.

== Geography ==
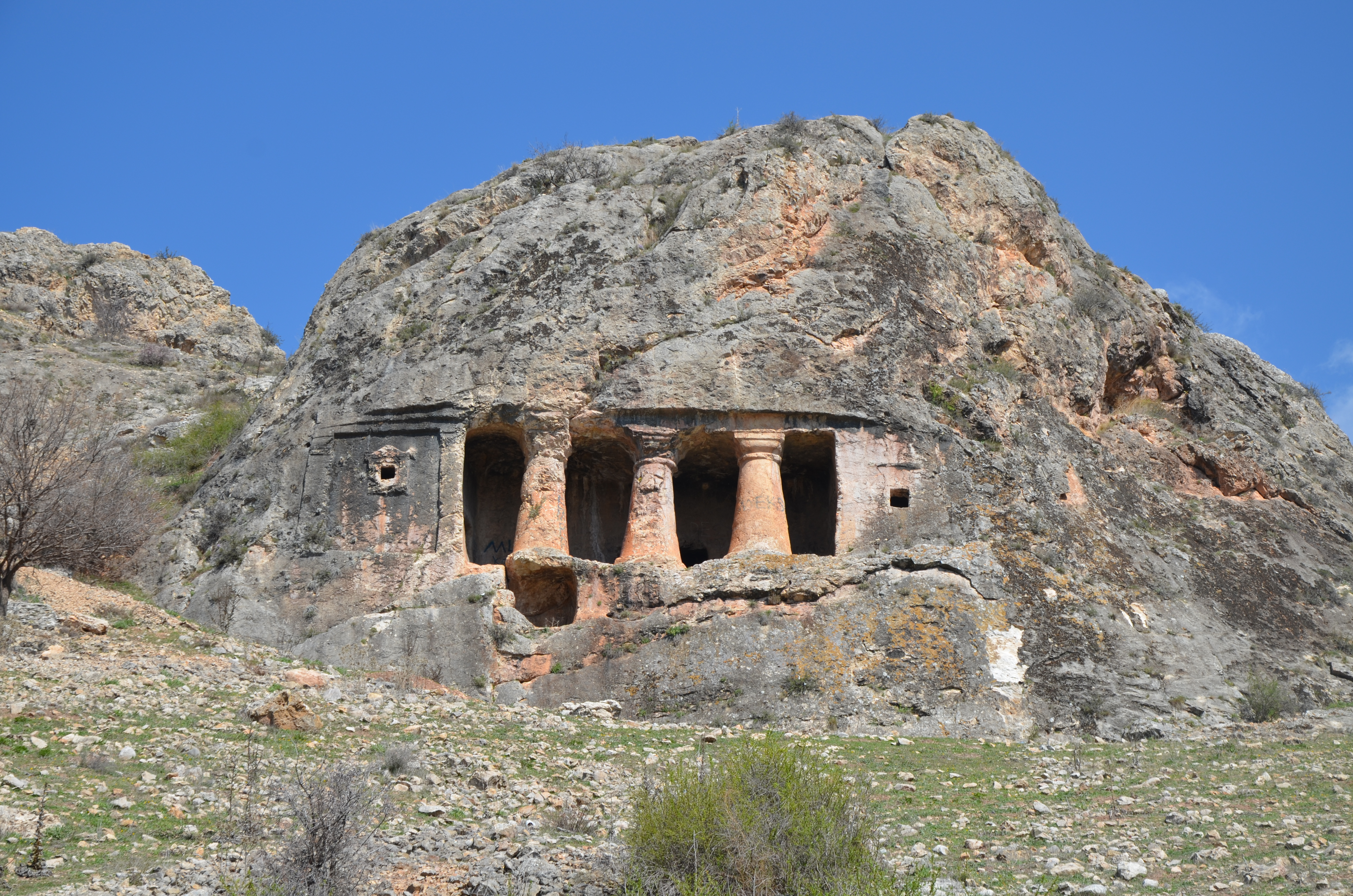
Gerdek Rock Tomb front, Hellenistic period, 2nd century BC, district of Çorum, Turkey.

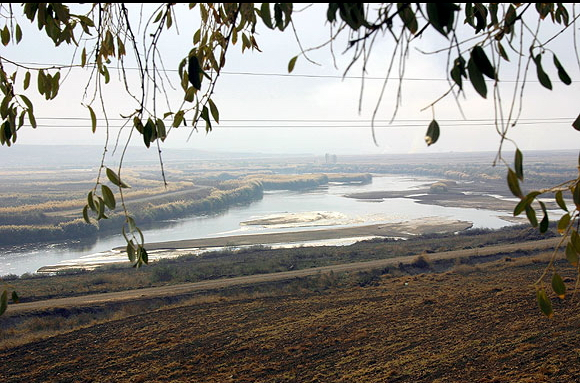
Kızılırmak and Taybı plain, İskilip

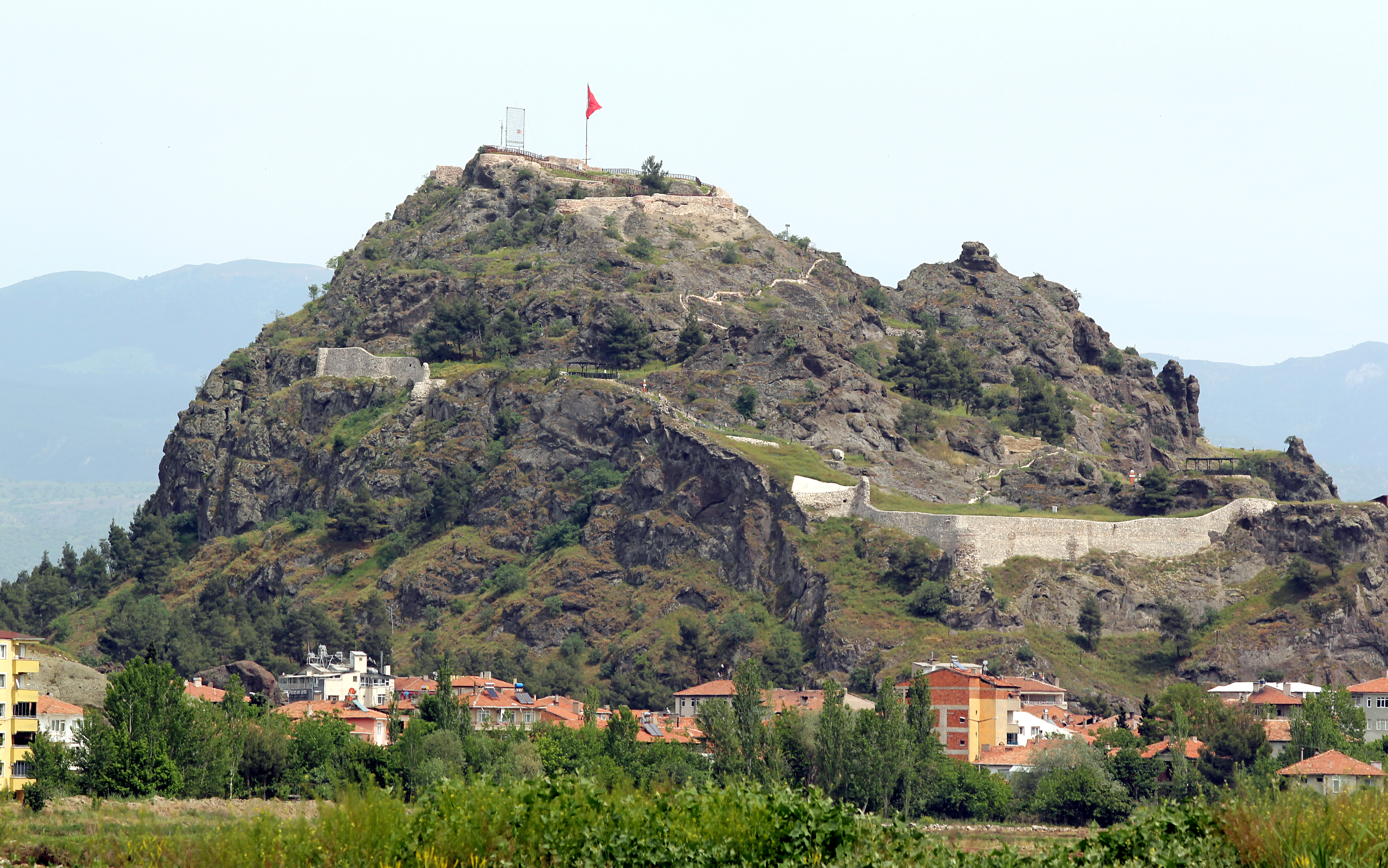
Osmancık Castle

The province of Çorum is a mixture of mountains and high plateaus, some of it watered by the Kızılırmak and Yeşilırmak rivers. The province includes much attractive high meadow and mountain for walking and excursions from the city and towns.

Month	Jan	Feb	Mar	Apr	May	Jun	Jul	Aug	Sep	Oct	Nov	Dec
Average high °C	4.2	6.5	11.5	17.4	21.8	25.6	28.9	29.1	25.6	19.5	12.1	6.0
Ave. low °C	-4.3	-3.8	-1.1	3.7	7.0	9.8	12.1	12.0	8.7	4.7	0.3	-2.3
source: www.meteor.gov.tr

=== Districts ===
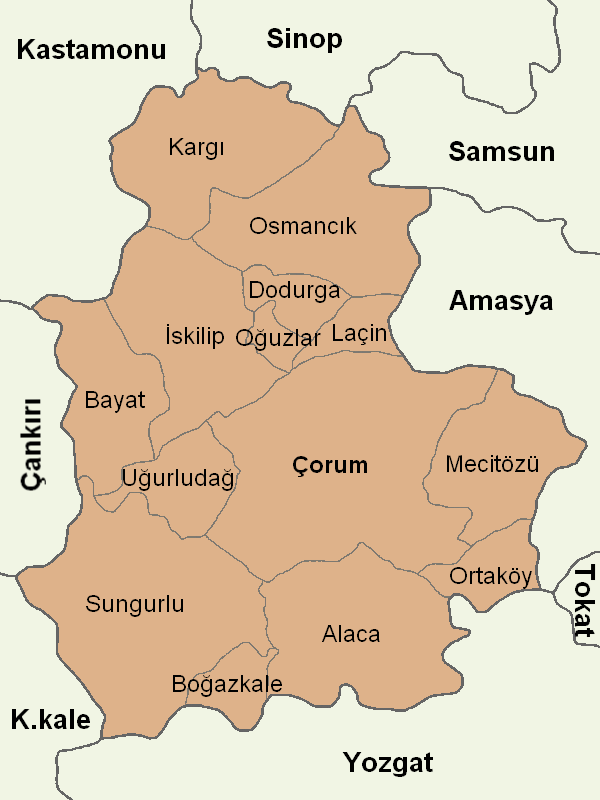

Çorum province is divided into 14 districts (capital district in bold):

- Alaca
- Bayat
- Boğazkale
- **Çorum**
- Dodurga
- İskilip
- Kargı
- Laçin
- Mecitözü
- Oğuzlar
- Ortaköy
- Osmancık
- Sungurlu
- Uğurludağ

== Population ==
Population statistical of districts
District	1831*	1849	1893	1907	1927	1950	1960	1970	1980	1990	2000	2007
Çorum	10.075*		49.057	80.973	60.752	88.056	118.536	144.569	168.985	189.748	221.699	
Alaca	-	-	-	-	26.787	46.444	54.315	56.657	56.724	53.403	53.193	
Bayat	-	-	-	-	-	-	22.836	27.078	31.957	36.294	30.574	
Boğazkale	-	-	-	-	-	-	-	-	-	9.973	8.190	
Dodurga	-	-	-	-	-	-	-	-	-	13.550	10.439	
İskilip	11.450*	43.442	43.271	52.362	53.722	66.611	55.618	67.434	72.569	52.569	45.327	
Kargı	-	-	-	-	-	-	31.564	32.261	31.247	26.762	20.388	
Laçin	-	-	-	-	-	-	-	-	-	11.960	9.425	
Mecitözü	-	-	31.928	1907	36.752	44.319	34.598	35.496	34.911	31.246	26.064	
Oğuzlar	-	-	-	-	-	-	-	-	-	11.154	9.083	
Ortaköy	-	-	-	-	-	-	9.580	11.016	12.420	13.073	11.820	
Osmancık	4.349*		17.639	29.473	29.184	33.494	42.960	53.849	63.018	52.490	53.758	
Sungurlu			67.607	39.793	40.405	62.429	76.382	90.006	100.000	88.327	80.840	
Uğurludağ	-	-	-	-	-	-	-	-	-	18.111	16.265	
Total				202.601	247.602	341.353	446.389	518.366	571.831	608.660	597.065	

- The census data of 1831 is only for the central city. Villages and towns are not included.
- The boxes with (-) sign are the times the before the subprovince was a subprovince.

== Food ==
Iskilip dolması is a Turkish dish of caramelized onions, rice and lamb that was traditionally cooked in a cloth bag in a large copper pot or cauldron, and the dish is a regional specialty of Çorum, where it is prepared in large quantities using traditional methods and is typically served at weddings.
