= Soğuksu =

Soğuksu, meaning "cold water" in English, is a Turkish word, and may refer to:

- Soğuksu Creek, a stream in Mersin Province, Turkey
- Soğuksu National Park, a protected area in Kızılcahamam district of Ankara Province, Turkey
- Soğuksu Nature Park, a protected area in Sarıkamış district of Kars Province, Turkey
- Soğuksu railway station, a railway station on the suburban railway in the European part of Istanbul, Turkey.
- Soğuksu, Manyas, a village
- Soğuksu, Kestel
- Soğuksu, Çorum
- Soğuksu, Gümüşova
- Soğuksu, İspir
- Soğuksu, Köprüköy
