= Mehmet Nesim Öner =

Turkish Paralympic athlete (born 1994)

Personal information
- Born: 20 December 1994 (age 31) Diyarbakır, Turkey

Sport
- Country: Turkey
- Sport: Paralympic athletics
- Disability class: T13
- Event: 1500 metres
Medal record
Paralympic athletics
Representing Turkey
European Championships
Gold medal – first place	2014 Swansea	1500m T13
Bronze medal – third place	2012 Stadskanaal	800m T13
Bronze medal – third place	2018 Berlin	1500m T13

Mehmet Nesim Öner (born 20 December 1994) is a Turkish former Paralympic athlete who competed at international track and field competitions. He is a European champion in middle-distance running, he also competed at the 2012 Summer Paralympics where he did not medal.

== Disability ==
When Öner was ten years old, he stepped on a landmine and lost his left arm and one of his eyes while he was grazing animals in the village of Uzunova in Kulp district near his home.
