= Akkaya =

Akkaya (a Turkish name meaning "white rock") may refer to:

== People ==
- Deniz Akkaya (born 1977), Turkish model and actress
- Gülşah Akkaya (born 1977), Turkish basketball player
- Hakan Akkaya (born 1995), Turkish para fencer
- Sarp Akkaya (born 1980), Turkish actor

== Places ==
- Akkaya, Akçakoca
- Akkaya, Ayaş, a village in Ankara Province, Turkey
- Akkaya, Çamlıdere, a village in Ankara Province, Turkey
- Akkaya, Dodurga
- Akkaya, Kargı
- Akkaya, Kozan, a village in Adana Province, Turkey
- Akkaya, Feke, a village in Adana Province, Turkey

== Other ==
- Akkaya Dam, a dam in Niğde Province, Turkey
