= Doğancı =

Doğancı can refer to:

- Doğancı, Bayramiç
- Doğancı, Biga
- Doğancı, Bolu, a village in Turkey
- Doğancı, Çamlıdere, a village in Turkey
- Doğancı, Hizan, a village in Turkey
- Doğancı, Manyas, a village in Turkey
- Doğancı, Yeniçağa, a village in Turkey
- the Turkish name for Elia, Nicosia in Cyprus
