= Yılanlı =

Yılanlı (Turkic: "with serpents") may refer to:

- Yılanlı, Çamlıdere, a village in the district of Çamlıdere, Ankara Province, Turkey
- Yılanlı, Kalecik, a village in the district of Kalecik, Ankara Province, Turkey
- Yılanlı Island, a Mediterranean island in Silifke ilçe of Mersin Province, Turkey
- The former name of Gurbansoltan Eje, Turkmenistan
- Yılanlı Sütun, the Turkish name of the Serpent Column in Istanbul, Turkey
- Yılanlı, Köprüköy
