= Elmalı (disambiguation) =

Elmalı (literally "with apples" or "place with apples") is a Turkish word that may refer to the following places in Turkey:

== People ==
- Havva Elmalı, Turkish female para athlete

== Places ==
- Elmalı, a town and district of Antalya Province
  - Elmalı, Antalya, a village in the district
- Elmalı, Aziziye
- Elmalı, Biga
- Elmalı, Çameli
- Elmalı, Çamlıdere, a village in the district of Çamlıdere, Ankara Province
- Elmalı, Çorum
- Elmalı, Demirözü, a village in the district of Demirözü, Bayburt Province
- Elmalı, İskilip
- Elmalı, İznik
- Elmalı, Kemah
- Elmalı, Kulp
- Elmalı, Şavşat, a village in the district of Şavşat, Artvin Province
- Elmalı, Tercan
- Elmalı, Uzunköprü, a village in the district of Uzunköprü, Edirne Province
- Elmalı, Vezirköprü, a village in the district of Vezirköprü, Samsun Province

=== Places which has a different pronunciation of the same word with Elmalı ===
- Almaty, the capital city of Kazakhstan (which is a different pronunciation of the same word with Elmalı)

== Other ==
- Elmalı-2 Dam, a dam
