= Boğazpınar =

Boğazpınar can refer to the following villages in Turkey:

- Boğazpınar, Manyas
- Boğazpınar, Tarsus
