= Kuşçular =

Kuşçular (literally "bird owners") is a Turkish populated place name and it may refer to

- Kuşçular, Çamlıdere a village in Çamlıdere district of Ankara Province
- Kuşçular, Nazilli a village in Nazilli district of Aydın Province
- Kuşçular, Tarsus a village in Tarsuse district of Mersin Province
- Kuşçular, Tosya, a village
- Kuşçular, Vezirköprü a village in Vezirköprü district of Samsun Province
