= Alaca =

Alaca (Turkish pronunciation: [aɫad͡ʒa]) may refer to the following places in Turkey:

- Alaca, Çorum, a large district in Çorum Province
  - Alaca Dam
- Alaca, Borçka, a village in Artvin Province
- Alaca, Beşiri, a village in Batman Province
- Alaca, Elâzığ, a village in Elâzığ Province
- Alaca, Aydıntepe, a village in Bayburt Province
- Alaca, Kulp, a village in Diyarbakır Province
- Alaca, Aziziye, a neighbourhood in Erzurum Province
- Alaca, Hınıs, a village in Erzurum Province
- Alaca, İnebolu, a village in Kastamonu Province
- Alaca, Köprüköy

== See also ==
- Alaca Höyük, an archaeological site in Turkey
- Alaja (disambiguation)
