= Hamamlı =

Hamamlı may refer to:

- Hamamlı, Artvin
- Hamamlı, Manyas
- Hamamlu, East Azerbaijan
