= Örenköy =

Örenköy can refer to the following villages in Turkey:

- Örenköy, Balya
- Örenköy, Çamlıdere
- Örenköy, Çerkeş
- Örenköy, Dursunbey
- Örenköy, Emirdağ
- Örenköy, Manyas
