= Bardakçılar =

Bardakçılar can refer to:

- Bardakçılar, Çamlıdere
- Bardakçılar, Çan
