= Çamköy =

Çamköy (literally "pine village" in Turkish) may refer to the following places in Turkey:

- Çamköy, Ayvacık
- Çamköy, Bekilli
- Çamköy, Bigadiç, a village
- Çamköy, Buldan
- Çamköy, Çamlıdere, a village in the district of Çamlıdere, Ankara Province
- Çamköy, Çan
- Çamköy, Dursunbey, a village
- Çamköy, Ezine
- Çamköy, Germencik, a village in the district of Germencik, Aydın Province
- Çamköy, Gölhisar
- Çamköy, Karacasu, a village in the district of Karacasu, Aydın Province
- Çamköy Dam
