= Aygün =

Aygün is both a surname and a given name. Notable people with the name include:

- Emre Aygün, Turkish footballer
- Necat Aygün, Turkish footballer
- Aygun Kazimova, Azerbaijani singer

== See also ==
- Aygün, Kulp
- Ayios Yeoryios, Famagusta, Cyprus village
