= Meşeler =

Meşeler can refer to:

- Meşeler, Çamlıdere
- Meşeler, Eğil
