= Alakoç =

Alakoç may refer to:

- Alakoç, Çamlıdere, village in Turkey
- Alakoç, Çermik

== People with the surname ==
- Metin Alakoç (born 1942), Turkish sport wrestler
