= Baloğlu =

Baloğlu can refer to:

- Baloğlu, Kulp
- Baloğlu, Refahiye
