= Kuyubaşı =

Kuyubaşı can refer to:

- Kuyubaşı, Batman
- Kuyubaşı, Bilecik
- Kuyubaşı, Bucak
- Kuyubaşı, Çamlıdere
