= Çakırca =

Çakırca can refer to the following villages in Turkey:

- Çakırca, Dursunbey
- Çakırca, Manyas
