= Pelitcik =

Pelitcik or Pelitçik can refer to the following villages in Turkey:

- Pelitcik, Bolu
- Pelitçik, Çamlıdere
- Pelitcik, Göynük
- Pelitçik, Kargı
- Pelitçik, Osmancık
- Pelitcik, Savaştepe
