= Tuzlaköy =

Tuzlaköy can refer to:

- Tuzlaköy, Kulp
- Tuzlaköy, Lice
- Tuzlaköy, Oltu
