= Müsellim (disambiguation) =

Müsellim, a Turkish word meaning 'deputy', was a title during the Ottoman Empire. It may also refer to the following places in Turkey:

- Müsellim, Çamlıdere, Ankara Province
- Müsellim, Yapraklı, Çankırı Province
