= Kayaca =

Kayaca can refer to:

- Kayaca, Manyas
- Kayaca, Tavas
