= Aşağıçakmak =

Aşağıçakmak can refer to:

- Aşağıçakmak, Keban
- Aşağıçakmak, Köprüköy
