= Kalfa =

Kalfa may refer to:

- Kalfa (harem title)
- Kalfa, Manyas
