= Carus Vicus =

Town of ancient Bithynia

Coordinates: 40°28′57″N 32°12′15″E

Carus Vicus was a town of ancient Bithynia. It was on the main road from Claudiopolis through Cratia (Flaviopolis) and Carus Vicus to Ancyra in Galatia. It was 30 M.P. from Cratia.

Its site is located near Çukurören, Asiatic Turkey.
