= Doğanlar =

Doğanlar can refer to the following villages in Turkey:

- Doğanlar, Balya
- Doğanlar, Çamlıdere
- Doğanlar, İscehisar
- Doğanlar, Laçin
- Doğanlar, Orta
- Doğanlar, Yığılca
