= Ayhanköy, Kulp =

Village in Turkey

Ayhanköy
- Neighbourhood
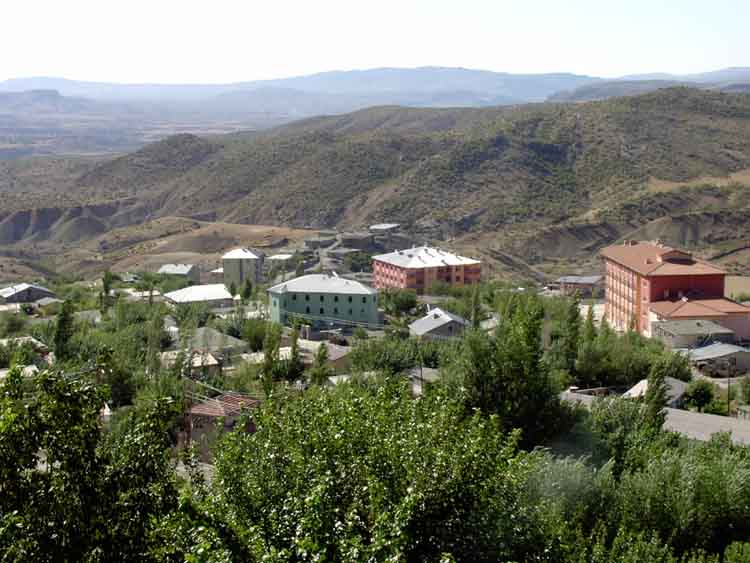
- Kulp

- Location within Turkey
- Coordinates: 38°19′N 41°09′E
- Country: Turkey
- Province: Diyarbakır
- District: Kulp
- Population (2022): 171
- Time zone: UTC+3 (TRT)

Ayhanköy (Armenian: Բահմեդա, romanized: Bahmeda, Kurdish: Bahemdan) is a neighbourhood in the municipality and district of Kulp, Diyarbakır Province in Turkey. It is populated by Kurds and had a population of 171 in 2022.
