= Darıca, Manyas =

Village in Turkey

Darıca
- Neighbourhood
- Location in Turkey Darıca (Marmara)
- Coordinates: 40.020°N 27.863°E
- Country: Turkey
- Province: Balıkesir
- District: Manyas
- Population (2022): 317
- Time zone: UTC+3 (TRT)

Darıca is a neighbourhood in the municipality and district of Manyas, Balıkesir Province in Turkey. Its population is 317 (2022).
