= Sarıkavak, Çamlıdere =

Sarıkavak
- Neighbourhood
- Country: Turkey
- Province: Ankara
- District: Çamlıdere
- Population (2022): 223
- Time zone: UTC+3 (TRT)

Sarıkavak is a neighbourhood in the municipality and district of Çamlıdere, Ankara Province, Turkey. Its population is 223 (2022).
