= Yayıkköy, Kulp =

Village in Turkey

Yayıkköy
- Neighbourhood
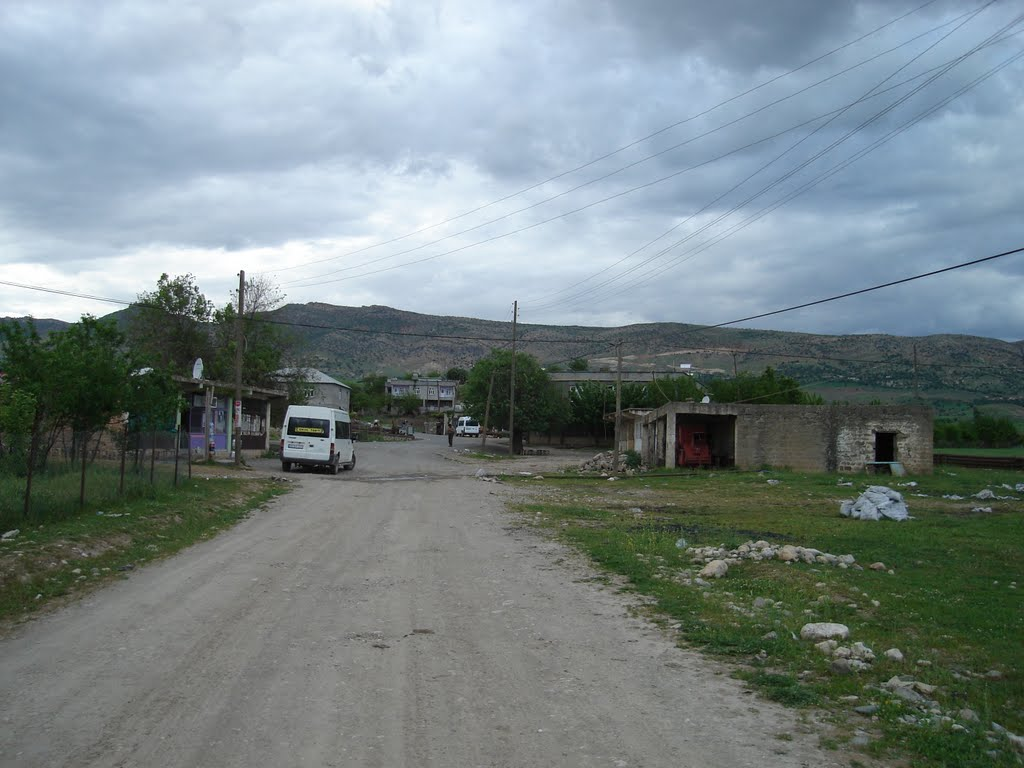

- Location within Turkey
- Coordinates: 38°16′N 41°06′E
- Country: Turkey
- Province: Diyarbakır
- District: Kulp
- Population (2022): 439
- Time zone: UTC+3 (TRT)

Yayıkköy (Kurdish: Mala Xerzê) is a neighbourhood in the municipality and district of Kulp, Diyarbakır Province in Turkey. It is populated by Kurds and had a population of 439 in 2022.
