= Karaağaç, Kulp =

Village in Turkey

Karaağaç
- Neighbourhood
- Location in Turkey
- Coordinates: 38.430°N 40.864°E
- Country: Turkey
- Province: Diyarbakır
- District: Kulp
- Population (2022): 497
- Time zone: UTC+3 (TRT)

Karaağaç (Kurdish: Bênîn) is a neighbourhood in the municipality and district of Kulp, Diyarbakır Province in Turkey. It is populated by Kurds and had a population of 497 in 2022.
