= Eskiçatal, Manyas =

Village in Turkey

Eskiçatal
- Neighbourhood
- Location in Turkey Eskiçatal (Marmara)
- Coordinates: 40°04′N 28°01′E
- Country: Turkey
- Province: Balıkesir
- District: Manyas
- Population (2022): 389
- Time zone: UTC+3 (TRT)

Eskiçatal is a neighbourhood in the municipality and district of Manyas, Balıkesir Province in Turkey. Its population is 389 (2022).
