= Çavuşköy, Manyas =

Village in Turkey

Çavuşköy
- Neighbourhood
- Location in Turkey Çavuşköy (Marmara)
- Coordinates: 40.072°N 27.898°E
- Country: Turkey
- Province: Balıkesir
- District: Manyas
- Population (2022): 243
- Time zone: UTC+3 (TRT)

Çavuşköy is a neighbourhood in the municipality and district of Manyas, Balıkesir Province in Turkey. Its population is 243 (2022).
