= Işıklar, Manyas =

Village in Turkey

Işıklar
- Neighbourhood
- Location in Turkey Işıklar (Marmara)
- Coordinates: 40.010°N 27.845°E
- Country: Turkey
- Province: Balıkesir
- District: Manyas
- Population (2022): 103
- Time zone: UTC+3 (TRT)

Işıklar is a neighbourhood in the municipality and district of Manyas, Balıkesir Province in Turkey. Its population is 103 (2022).
