= Güney, Çamlıdere =

Güney
- Neighbourhood
- Country: Turkey
- Province: Ankara
- District: Çamlıdere
- Population (2022): 66
- Time zone: UTC+3 (TRT)

Güney is a neighbourhood in the municipality and district of Çamlıdere, Ankara Province, Turkey. Its population is 66 (2022).
