= Manyas =

- District and municipality
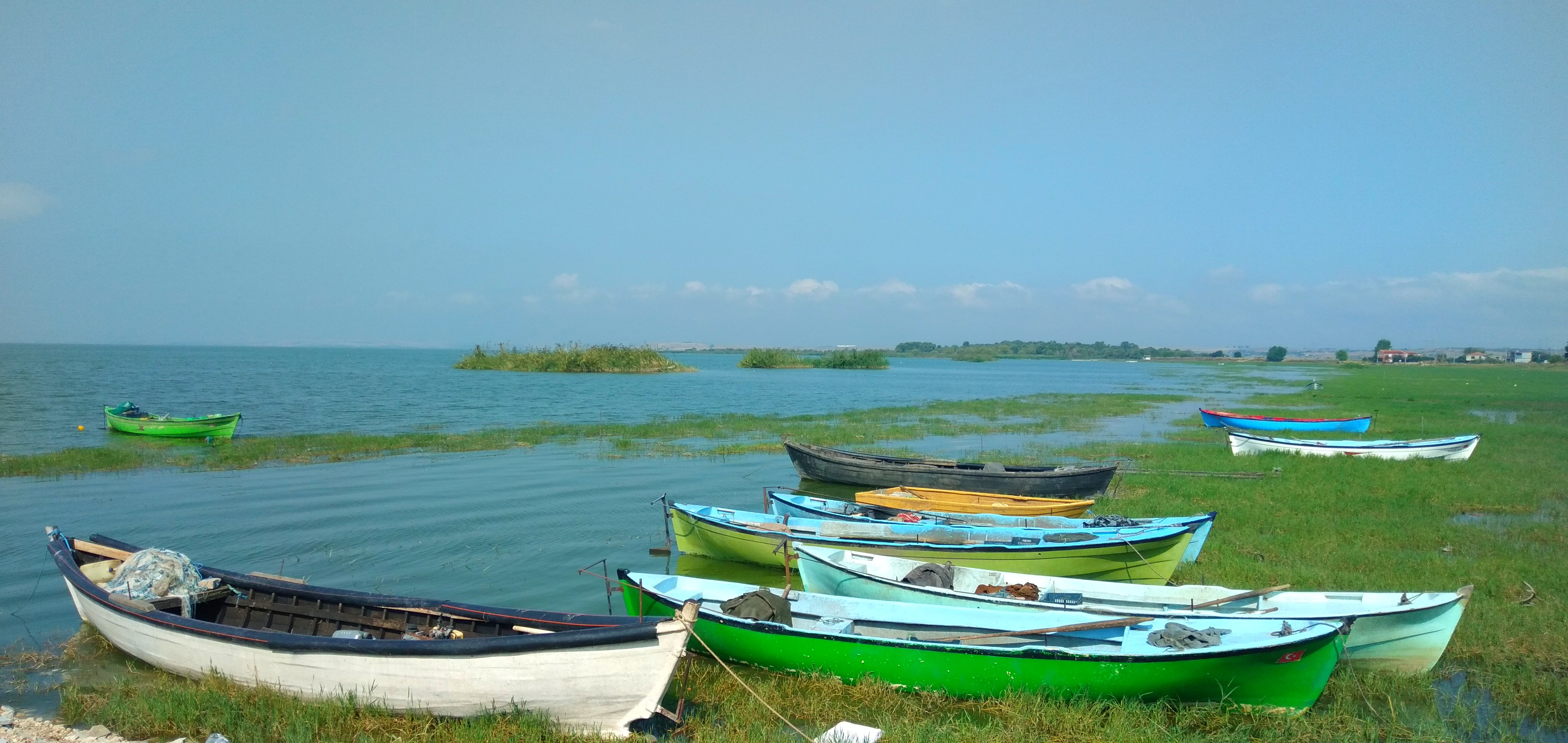
- Kuşcenneti (Bird Paradise), Manyas

- Map showing Manyas District in Balıkesir Province

- Location within Turkey Location within Marmara
- Coordinates: 40°2′47″N 27°58′12″E
- Country: Turkey
- Province: Balıkesir

Government
  - Mayor: Tancan Barcin (CHP)
- Area: 634 km^{2} (245 sq mi)
- Population (2022): 18,066
  - Density: 28.5/km^{2} (73.8/sq mi)
- Time zone: UTC+3 (TRT)
- Postal code: 10470
- Area code: 0266
- Website: www.manyas.bel.tr

Manyas is a municipality and district of Balıkesir Province, Turkey. Its area is 634 km^{2}, and its population is 18,066 (2022). The mayor is Tancan Barçın (CHP). The important bird area Lake Kuş and the Kuşcenneti National Park cover part of the district.

== Composition ==
There are 50 neighbourhoods in Manyas District:

- Akçaova
- Atatürk
- Boğazpınar
- Bölceağaç
- Çakırca
- Çal
- Çamlı
- Çarşı
- Çataltepe
- Çavuşköy
- Cumhuriyet
- Darıca
- Değirmenboğazı
- Dereköy
- Doğancı
- Dura
- Ericek
- Eşen
- Eskiçatal
- Eskimanyas
- Hacıibrahimpınarı
- Hacıosman
- Hacıyakup
- Hamamlı
- Haydarköy
- Hekim
- İrşadiye
- Işıklar
- Kalebayır
- Kalfa
- Kapaklı
- Karakabaağaç
- Kayaca
- Kızık
- Kızıksa
- Kocagöl
- Koçoğlu
- Kubaş
- Kulakköy
- Maltepe
- Necipköy
- Örenköy
- Peynirkuyusu
- Salur
- Şevketiye
- Süleymanlı
- Tepecik
- Yaylaköy
- Yeni
- Yeniköy

== Gallery ==
Kuşcenneti National Park.

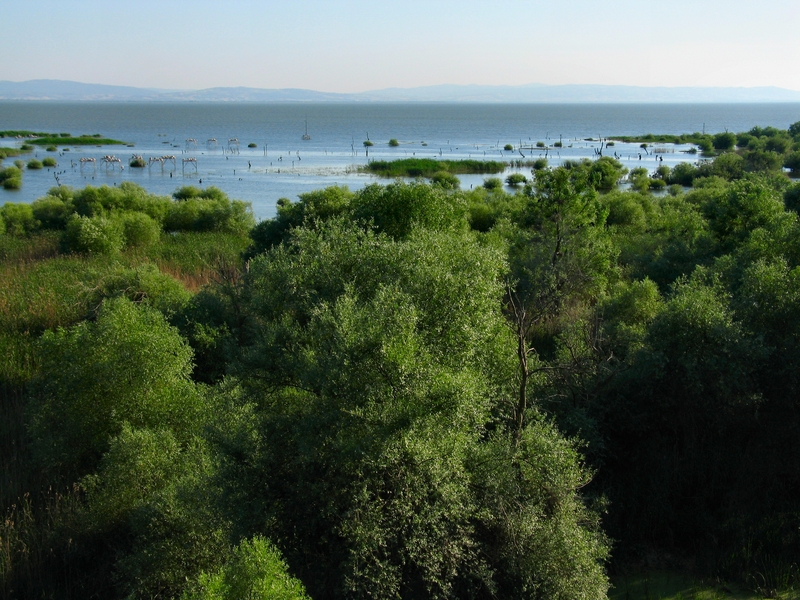

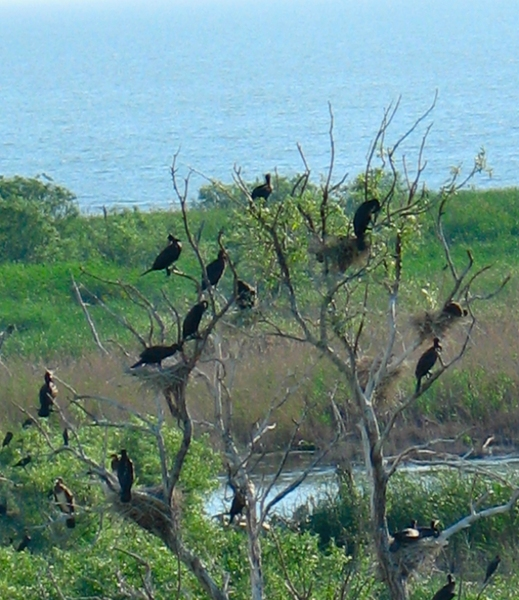

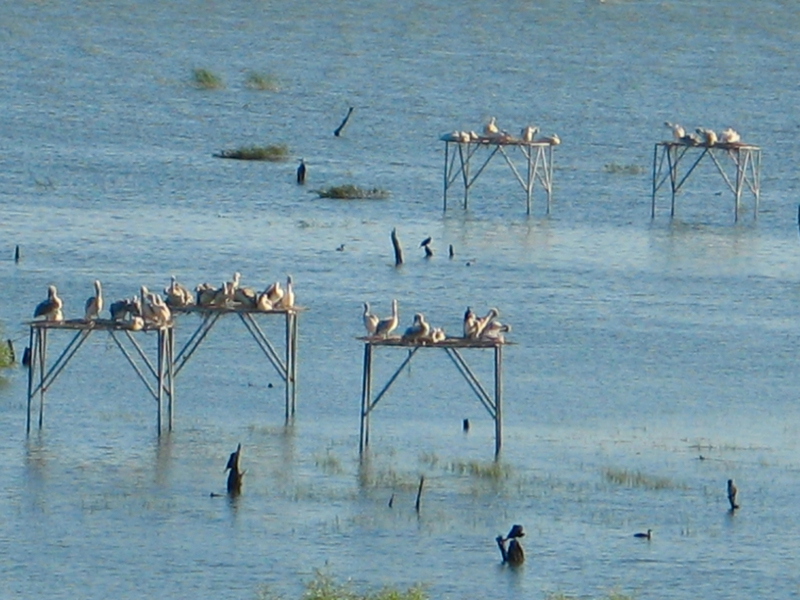

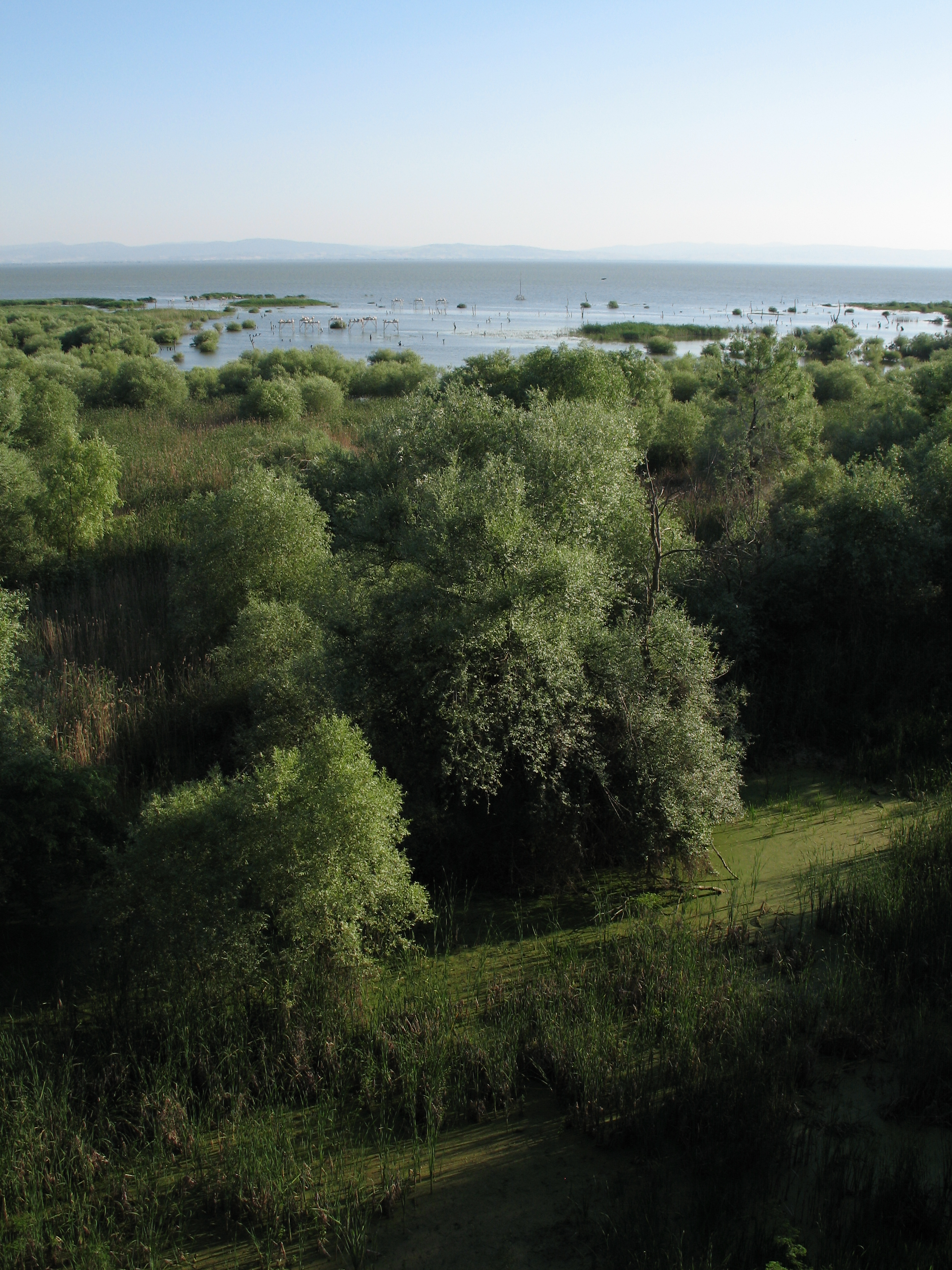

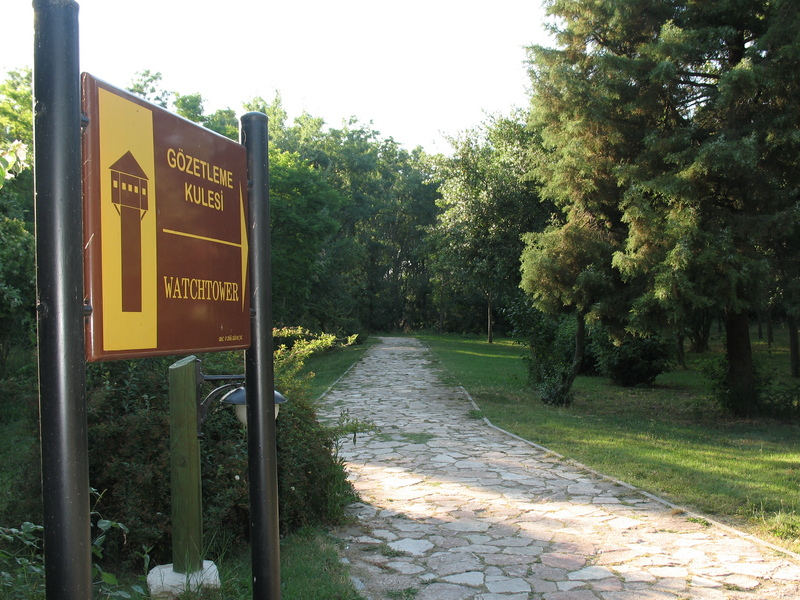

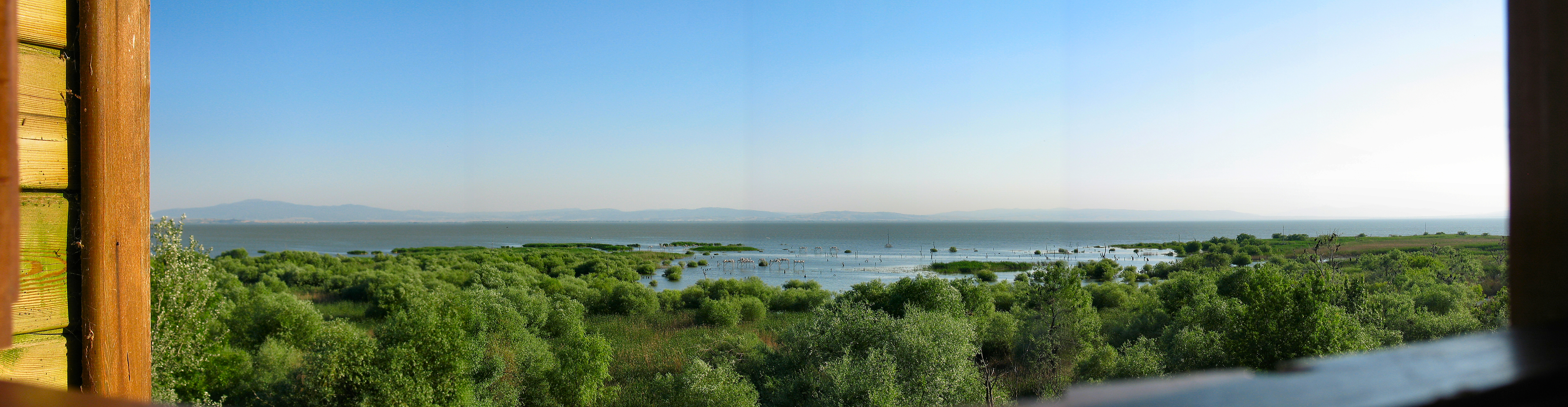
