= Güleç, Kulp =

Village in Turkey

Güleç
- Neighbourhood
- Location in Turkey
- Coordinates: 38°21′35″N 41°01′10″E
- Country: Turkey
- Province: Diyarbakır
- District: Kulp
- Population (2022): 327
- Time zone: UTC+3 (TRT)

Güleç (Kurdish: Şawîşan) is a neighbourhood in the municipality and district of Kulp, Diyarbakır Province in Turkey. It is populated by Kurds and had a population of 327 in 2022.
