= Köprüköy =

- District and municipality
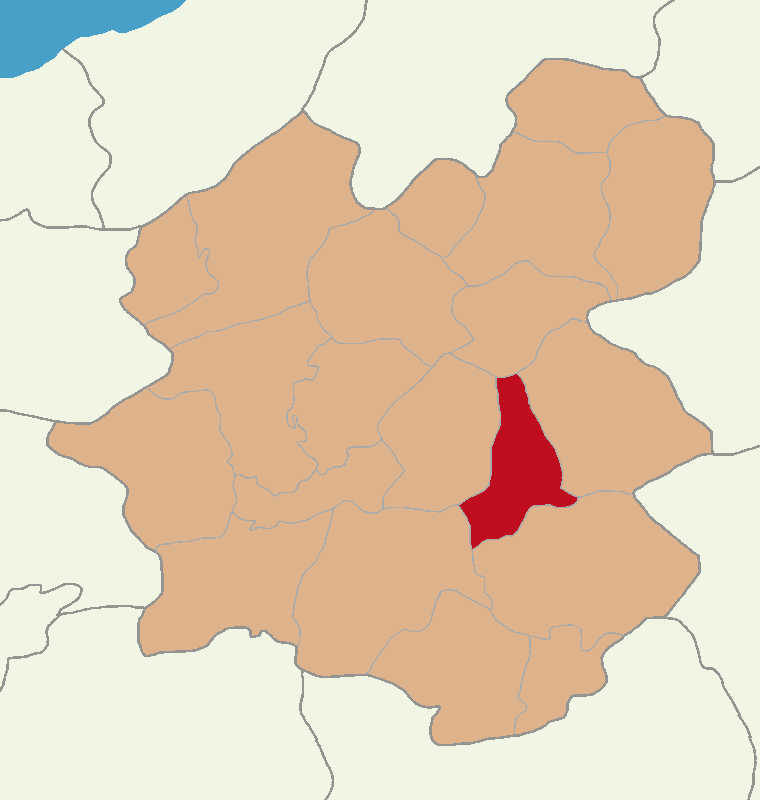
- Map showing Köprüköy District in Erzurum Province

- Location within Turkey
- Coordinates: 39°58′32″N 41°52′16″E
- Country: Turkey
- Province: Erzurum

Government
  - Mayor: Nevzat Karasu (AKP)
- Area: 777 km^{2} (300 sq mi)
- Population (2022): 14,204
  - Density: 18.3/km^{2} (47.3/sq mi)
- Time zone: UTC+3 (TRT)
- Postal code: 25300
- Area code: 0442
- Climate: Dfb
- Website: www.koprukoy.bel.tr

Köprüköy,(lit. 'Bridge village') (Kurdish: Avnîk) is a municipality and district of Erzurum Province, Turkey. Its area is 777 km^{2}, and its population is 14,204 (2022). The mayor is Nevzat Karasu (AKP).

== Composition ==
There are 42 neighbourhoods in Köprüköy District:

- Ağcaşar
- Akçam
- Alaca
- Aşağıçakmak
- Aşağıkızılkale
- Ataköy
- Buğdaylı
- Camikebir
- Çullu
- Derebaşı
- Dilek
- Duatepe
- Dumankaya
- Eğirmez
- Emre
- Eyüpler
- Geyikli
- Gölçayır
- Güzelhisar
- Ilıcasu
- Karataşlar
- Kayabaşı
- Kıyıkonak
- Marifet
- Mescitli
- Örentaş
- Ortaklar
- Pekecik
- Sarıtaş
- Savatlı
- Şehitler
- Soğuksu
- Topçu
- Yağan
- Yapağılı
- Yemlik
- Yeşilöz
- Yılanlı
- Yukarıkızılca
- Yukarıkızılkale
- Yukarısöğütlü
- Ziyaret
