= Eğirmez, Köprüköy =

Village in Turkey

Eğirmez
- Neighbourhood
- Location in Turkey
- Coordinates: 39°57′N 41°50′E
- Country: Turkey
- Province: Erzurum
- District: Köprüköy
- Population (2022): 298
- Time zone: UTC+3 (TRT)

Eğirmez is a neighbourhood in the municipality and district of Köprüköy, Erzurum Province in Turkey. Its population is 298 (2022).
