= Karaorman, Kulp =

Village in Turkey

Karaorman
- Neighbourhood
- Location in Turkey
- Coordinates: 38°17′31″N 41°5′10″E
- Country: Turkey
- Province: Diyarbakır
- District: Kulp
- Population (2022): 160
- Time zone: UTC+3 (TRT)

Karaorman (Kurdish: Kerra, Kerran) is a neighbourhood in the municipality and district of Kulp, Diyarbakır Province in Turkey. It is populated by Kurds and had a population of 160 in 2022.
