= Demirli, Kulp =

Village in Turkey

Demirli
- Neighbourhood
- Location in Turkey
- Coordinates: 38°22′48″N 40°54′40″E
- Country: Turkey
- Province: Diyarbakır
- District: Kulp
- Population (2022): 199
- Time zone: UTC+3 (TRT)

Demirli (Kurdish: Temiran) is a neighbourhood in the municipality and district of Kulp, Diyarbakır Province in Turkey. It is populated by Kurds and had a population of 199 in 2022.
