= Yukarıkızılca, Köprüköy =

Village in Turkey

Yukarıkızılca
- Neighbourhood
- Location in Turkey
- Coordinates: 39.892°N 42.029°E
- Country: Turkey
- Province: Erzurum
- District: Köprüköy
- Population (2022): 116
- Time zone: UTC+3 (TRT)

Yukarıkızılca is a neighbourhood in the municipality and district of Köprüköy, Erzurum Province in Turkey. Its population is 116 (2022).
