= Yuvacık, Kulp =

Village in Turkey

Yuvacık
- Neighbourhood
- Location in Turkey
- Coordinates: 38°29′06″N 41°08′38″E
- Country: Turkey
- Province: Diyarbakır
- District: Kulp
- Population (2022): 282
- Time zone: UTC+3 (TRT)

Yuvacık (Armenian: Հեղին, romanized: Heghin, Kurdish: Hêlîn) is a neighbourhood in the municipality and district of Kulp, Diyarbakır Province in Turkey. It is populated by Kurds and had a population of 282 in 2022.
