= Konuklu, Kulp =

Village in Turkey

Konuklu
- Neighbourhood
- Location in Turkey
- Coordinates: 38°24′01″N 41°05′39″E
- Country: Turkey
- Province: Diyarbakır
- District: Kulp
- Population (2022): 711
- Time zone: UTC+3 (TRT)

Konuklu (Kurdish: Duderyan) is a neighbourhood in the municipality and district of Kulp, Diyarbakır Province in Turkey. It is populated by Kurds and had a population of 711 in 2022.
