= Marifet, Köprüköy =

Village in Turkey

Marifet
- Neighbourhood
- Location in Turkey
- Coordinates: 39°50′33″N 41°49′35″E
- Country: Turkey
- Province: Erzurum
- District: Köprüköy
- Population (2022): 239
- Time zone: UTC+3 (TRT)

Marifet is a neighbourhood in the municipality and district of Köprüköy, Erzurum Province in Turkey. Its population is 239 (2022).
