= Çataltepe, Manyas =

Village in Turkey

Çataltepe
- Neighbourhood
- Location in Turkey Çataltepe (Marmara)
- Coordinates: 40°00′27″N 27°54′03″E
- Country: Turkey
- Province: Balıkesir
- District: Manyas
- Population (2022): 97
- Time zone: UTC+3 (TRT)

Çataltepe is a neighbourhood in the municipality and district of Manyas, Balıkesir Province in Turkey. Its population is 97 (2022).
