= Ağıllı, Kulp =

Village in Turkey

Ağıllı
- Neighbourhood
- Location in Turkey
- Coordinates: 38.5626°N 40.8671°E
- Country: Turkey
- Province: Diyarbakır
- District: Kulp
- Population (2022): 31
- Time zone: UTC+3 (TRT)

Ağıllı (Kurdish: Gomag) is a neighbourhood in the municipality and district of Kulp, Diyarbakır Province in Turkey. It is populated by Kurds and had a population of 31 in 2022.
