= Yaylak, Kulp =

Village in Turkey

Yaylak
- Neighbourhood
- Location in Turkey
- Coordinates: 38°34′54″N 41°02′05″E
- Country: Turkey
- Province: Diyarbakır
- District: Kulp
- Population (2022): 231
- Time zone: UTC+3 (TRT)

Yaylak (Armenian: Էհուբ, romanized: Ehub, Kurdish: Eskar) is a neighbourhood in the municipality and district of Kulp, Diyarbakır Province in Turkey. It is populated by Kurds and had a population of 231 in 2022.

Before the Armenian genocide, Ehub was a large Armenian village.
