= Değirmenboğazı, Manyas =

Village in Turkey

Değirmenboğazı
- Neighbourhood
- Location in Turkey Değirmenboğazı (Marmara)
- Coordinates: 39.998°N 27.831°E
- Country: Turkey
- Province: Balıkesir
- District: Manyas
- Population (2022): 84
- Time zone: UTC+3 (TRT)

Değirmenboğazı is a neighbourhood in the municipality and district of Manyas, Balıkesir Province in Turkey. Its population is 84 (2022).
