= Hacıyakup, Manyas =

Village in Turkey

Hacıyakup
- Neighbourhood
- Location in Turkey Hacıyakup (Marmara)
- Coordinates: 40.043°N 27.880°E
- Country: Turkey
- Province: Balıkesir
- District: Manyas
- Population (2022): 61
- Time zone: UTC+3 (TRT)

Hacıyakup is a neighbourhood in the municipality and district of Manyas, Balıkesir Province in Turkey. Its population is 61 (2022).
