= Buğdaylı, Köprüköy =

Village in Turkey

Buğdaylı
- Neighbourhood
- Location in Turkey
- Coordinates: 39.9744°N 41.9841°E
- Country: Turkey
- Province: Erzurum
- District: Köprüköy
- Population (2022): 421
- Time zone: UTC+3 (TRT)

Buğdaylı is a neighbourhood in the municipality and district of Köprüköy, Erzurum Province in Turkey. Its population is 421 (2022).
