= Koçoğlu, Manyas =

Village in Turkey

Koçoğlu
- Neighbourhood
- Location in Turkey Koçoğlu (Marmara)
- Coordinates: 39°57′29″N 27°52′51″E
- Country: Turkey
- Province: Balıkesir
- District: Manyas
- Population (2022): 315
- Time zone: UTC+3 (TRT)

Koçoğlu is a neighbourhood in the municipality and district of Manyas, Balıkesir Province in Turkey. Its population is 315 (2022).
