= Yahşihan, Çamlıdere =

Yahşihan
- Neighbourhood
- Country: Turkey
- Province: Ankara
- District: Çamlıdere
- Population (2022): 71
- Time zone: UTC+3 (TRT)

Yahşihan is a neighbourhood in the municipality and district of Çamlıdere, Ankara Province, Turkey. Its population is 71 (2022).
