= Bağcılar, Kulp =

Village in Turkey

Bağcılar
- Neighbourhood
- Location in Turkey
- Coordinates: 38.4224°N 40.9636°E
- Country: Turkey
- Province: Diyarbakır
- District: Kulp
- Population (2022): 398
- Time zone: UTC+3 (TRT)

Bağcılar (Kurdish: Hacanan) is a neighbourhood in the municipality and district of Kulp, Diyarbakır Province in Turkey. It is populated by Kurds and had a population of 398 in 2022.
