= Avşarlar, Çamlıdere =

Avşarlar
- Neighbourhood
- Location in Turkey Avşarlar (Turkey Central Anatolia)
- Coordinates: 40°31′N 32°26′E
- Country: Turkey
- Province: Ankara
- District: Çamlıdere
- Population (2022): 66
- Time zone: UTC+3 (TRT)

Avşarlar is a neighbourhood in the municipality and district of Çamlıdere, Ankara Province, Turkey. Its population is 66 (2022).

== Geography ==
It is located 120 km from Ankara and west of Çamlıdere town. The geographic structure of the neighborhood is uneven. Therefore, its arable land is 140 hectares. The residential area of the quarter is flat. According to the records of the General Directorate of Forestry, the village is a forest district as it is covered by Article 31.
