= Tatlak, Çamlıdere =

Tatlak
- Neighbourhood
- Location in Turkey Tatlak (Turkey Central Anatolia)
- Coordinates: 40°28′N 32°22′E
- Country: Turkey
- Province: Ankara
- District: Çamlıdere
- Population (2022): 135
- Time zone: UTC+3 (TRT)

Tatlak is a neighbourhood in the municipality and district of Çamlıdere, Ankara Province, Turkey. As of 2022, its population was 135.
