= Ağaçlı, Kulp =

Village in Turkey

Ağaçlı
- Neighbourhood
- Location in Turkey
- Coordinates: 38.5188°N 40.9108°E
- Country: Turkey
- Province: Diyarbakır
- District: Kulp
- Population (2022): 495
- Time zone: UTC+3 (TRT)

Ağaçlı (Armenian: Գազկե, romanized: Gazke, Kurdish: Cixsê) is a neighbourhood of the municipality and district of Kulp, Diyarbakır Province, Turkey. It is populated by Kurds and had a population of 495 in 2022.

Before the 2013 reorganisation, it was a town (belde).

== Demographics ==
On the eve of the first World War, the medieval village of Gazken had 2,000 houses. There were 100 Armenians.
