= Salkımlı, Kulp =

Salkımlı
- Neighbourhood
- Location in Turkey
- Coordinates: 38°23′47″N 41°9′28″E
- Country: Turkey
- Province: Diyarbakır
- District: Kulp
- Population (2022): 581
- Time zone: UTC+3 (TRT)

Salkımlı (Armenian: Փառկա, romanized: Pʿaṙka, Kurdish: Firqê) is a neighbourhood in the municipality and district of Kulp, Diyarbakır Province in Turkey. It is populated by Kurds and had a population of 581 in 2022.
