= Hekim, Manyas =

Village in Turkey

Hekim
- Neighbourhood
- Location in Turkey Hekim (Marmara)
- Coordinates: 40°01′N 27°58′E
- Country: Turkey
- Province: Balıkesir
- District: Manyas
- Population (2022): 234
- Time zone: UTC+3 (TRT)

Hekim is a neighbourhood in the municipality and district of Manyas, Balıkesir Province in Turkey. Its population is 234 (2022).
