= Ağaçkorur, Kulp =

Village in Turkey

Ağaçkorur
- Neighbourhood
- Location in Turkey
- Coordinates: 38.5903°N 41.1147°E
- Country: Turkey
- Province: Diyarbakır
- District: Kulp
- Population (2022): 248
- Time zone: UTC+3 (TRT)

Ağaçkorur (Armenian: Ընձաքար, romanized: Endzakar; Kurdish: Beyrok) is a neighbourhood in the municipality and district of Kulp, Diyarbakır Province in Turkey. It is populated by Kurds and had a population of 248 in 2022.

On the eve of the First World War, Endzakar was a large Armenian village with 140 inhabitants. The Surb Gevorg monastery was a place of pilgrimage. Geghrvan/Yüklüce was merged into Ağaçkorur.
