= Kayahan, Kulp =

Village in Turkey

Kayahan
- Neighbourhood
- Location in Turkey
- Coordinates: 38°16′55″N 41°08′42″E
- Country: Turkey
- Province: Diyarbakır
- District: Kulp
- Population (2022): 1,119
- Time zone: UTC+3 (TRT)

Kayahan (Armenian: Խոշըկան, romanized: Khoshekan, Kurdish: Xweşikan) is a neighbourhood in the municipality and district of Kulp, Diyarbakır Province in Turkey. It is populated by Kurds and had a population of 1,119 in 2022.
