= Savatlı, Köprüköy =

Village in Turkey

Savatlı
- Neighbourhood
- Country: Turkey
- Province: Erzurum
- District: Köprüköy
- Population (2022): 51
- Time zone: UTC+3 (TRT)

Savatlı is a neighbourhood in the municipality and district of Köprüköy, Erzurum Province in Turkey. Its population is 51 (2022).
