= Kapaklı, Manyas =

Village in Turkey

Kapaklı
- Neighbourhood
- Location in Turkey Kapaklı (Marmara)
- Coordinates: 40.016°N 27.952°E
- Country: Turkey
- Province: Balıkesir
- District: Manyas
- Population (2022): 200
- Time zone: UTC+3 (TRT)

Kapaklı is a neighbourhood in the municipality and district of Manyas, Balıkesir Province in Turkey. Its population is 200 (2022).
