= Uygur, Kulp =

Village in Turkey

Uygur
- Neighbourhood
- Location in Turkey
- Coordinates: 38.4442°N 40.9410°E
- Country: Turkey
- Province: Diyarbakır
- District: Kulp
- Population (2022): 188
- Time zone: UTC+3 (TRT)

Uygur (Kurdish: Havingê) is a neighbourhood in the municipality and district of Kulp, Diyarbakır Province in Turkey. It is populated by Kurds and had a population of 188 in 2022.
