= Yemlik, Köprüköy =

Village in Turkey

Yemlik
- Neighbourhood
- Location in Turkey
- Coordinates: 39°48′N 41°49′E
- Country: Turkey
- Province: Erzurum
- District: Köprüköy
- Population (2022): 38
- Time zone: UTC+3 (TRT)

Yemlik is a neighbourhood in the municipality and district of Köprüköy, Erzurum Province in Turkey. Its population is 38 (2022).
