= Dolun, Kulp =

Village in Turkey

Dolun
- Neighbourhood
- Location in Turkey
- Coordinates: 38°33′N 40°59′E
- Country: Turkey
- Province: Diyarbakır
- District: Kulp
- Population (2022): 79
- Time zone: UTC+3 (TRT)

Dolun (Kurdish: Arqetin) is a neighbourhood in the municipality and district of Kulp, Diyarbakır Province in Turkey. It is populated by Kurds and had a population of 79 in 2022.
