= Yukarıkızılkale, Köprüköy =

Village in Turkey

Yukarıkızılkale
- Neighbourhood
- Location in Turkey
- Coordinates: 39°43′32″N 41°44′48″E
- Country: Turkey
- Province: Erzurum
- District: Köprüköy
- Population (2022): 63
- Time zone: UTC+3 (TRT)

Yukarıkızılkale is a neighbourhood in the municipality and district of Köprüköy, Erzurum Province in Turkey. Its population is 63 (2022).
