= Eşen, Manyas =

Village in Turkey

Eşen
- Neighbourhood
- Location in Turkey Eşen (Marmara)
- Coordinates: 40.101°N 28.058°E
- Country: Turkey
- Province: Balıkesir
- District: Manyas
- Population (2022): 169
- Time zone: UTC+3 (TRT)

Eşen is a neighbourhood in the municipality and district of Manyas, Balıkesir Province in Turkey. Its population is 169 (2022).
