= Süleymanlı, Manyas =

Village in Turkey

Süleymanlı
- Neighbourhood
- Location in Turkey Süleymanlı (Marmara)
- Coordinates: 40.042°N 27.840°E
- Country: Turkey
- Province: Balıkesir
- District: Manyas
- Population (2022): 405
- Time zone: UTC+3 (TRT)

Süleymanlı is a neighbourhood in the municipality and district of Manyas, Balıkesir Province in Turkey. Its population is 405 (2022).
