= İnceöz, Çamlıdere =

İnceöz
- Neighbourhood
- Location in Turkey İnceöz (Turkey Central Anatolia)
- Coordinates: 40°26′N 32°21′E
- Country: Turkey
- Province: Ankara
- District: Çamlıdere
- Population (2022): 50
- Time zone: UTC+3 (TRT)

İnceöz is a neighbourhood in the municipality and district of Çamlıdere, Ankara Province, Turkey. As of 2022, its population was 50.
