= Akçam, Köprüköy =

Village in Turkey

Akçam
- Neighbourhood
- Location in Turkey
- Coordinates: 39.8599°N 41.9815°E
- Country: Turkey
- Province: Erzurum
- District: Köprüköy
- Population (2022): 541
- Time zone: UTC+3 (TRT)

Akçam is a neighbourhood in the municipality and district of Köprüköy, Erzurum Province in Turkey. Its population is 541 (2022).
