= Zeyrek, Kulp =

Village in Turkey

Zeyrek
- Neighbourhood
- Location in Turkey
- Coordinates: 38.4661°N 40.8547°E
- Country: Turkey
- Province: Diyarbakır
- District: Kulp
- Population (2022): 257
- Time zone: UTC+3 (TRT)

Zeyrek (Kurdish: Seyrek) is a neighbourhood in the municipality and district of Kulp, Diyarbakır Province in Turkey. It is populated by Kurds and had a population of 257 in 2022.
