= Özmüş, Çamlıdere =

Özmüş
- Neighbourhood
- Country: Turkey
- Province: Ankara
- District: Çamlıdere
- Population (2022): 203
- Time zone: UTC+3 (TRT)

Özmüş is a neighbourhood in the municipality and district of Çamlıdere, Ankara Province, Turkey. As of 2022, its population was 203.
