= Düzce, Kulp =

Village in Turkey

Düzce
- Neighbourhood
- Location in Turkey
- Coordinates: 38°22′45″N 40°58′21″E
- Country: Turkey
- Province: Diyarbakır
- District: Kulp
- Population (2022): 156
- Time zone: UTC+3 (TRT)

Düzce (Armenian: Մելիքան, romanized: Melikan, Kurdish: Mîlikan) is a neighbourhood in the municipality and district of Kulp, Diyarbakır Province in Turkey. It is populated by Kurds and had a population of 156 in 2022.
