= Bölceağaç, Manyas =

Village in Turkey

Bölceağaç
- Neighbourhood
- Location in Turkey Bölceağaç (Marmara)
- Coordinates: 40°05′N 27°58′E
- Country: Turkey
- Province: Balıkesir
- District: Manyas
- Population (2022): 372
- Time zone: UTC+3 (TRT)

Bölceağaç is a neighbourhood in the municipality and district of Manyas, Balıkesir Province in Turkey. Its population is 372 (2022).
