= Çukurca, Kulp =

Village in Turkey

Çukurca
- Neighbourhood
- Location in Turkey
- Coordinates: 38.407°N 40.944°E
- Country: Turkey
- Province: Diyarbakır
- District: Kulp
- Population (2022): 178
- Time zone: UTC+3 (TRT)

Çukurca (Kurdish: Çirik) is a neighbourhood in the municipality and district of Kulp, Diyarbakır Province in Turkey. It is populated by Kurds and had a population of 178 in 2022.
