= Atça, Çamlıdere =

Atça
- Neighbourhood
- Location in Turkey Atça (Turkey Central Anatolia)
- Coordinates: 40.5089°N 32.4013°E
- Country: Turkey
- Province: Ankara
- District: Çamlıdere
- Population (2022): 164
- Time zone: UTC+3 (TRT)

Atça is a neighbourhood in the municipality and district of Çamlıdere, Ankara Province, Turkey. Its population is 164 (2022).

== Population ==
Year	Residents
2009	7,397
2013	7,575
2017	7,751
2022	7,563
