= Elören, Çamlıdere =

Elören
- Neighbourhood
- Location in Turkey Elören (Turkey Central Anatolia)
- Coordinates: 40.4216°N 32.5270°E
- Country: Turkey
- Province: Ankara
- District: Çamlıdere
- Population (2022): 79
- Time zone: UTC+3 (TRT)

Elören is a neighbourhood in the municipality and district of Çamlıdere, Ankara Province, Turkey. As of 2022, its population was 79.
