= Güllük, Kulp =

Village in Turkey

Güllük
- Neighbourhood
- Location in Turkey
- Coordinates: 38.469°N 40.901°E
- Country: Turkey
- Province: Diyarbakır
- District: Kulp
- Population (2022): 162
- Time zone: UTC+3 (TRT)

Güllük (Kurdish: Qoqan) is a neighbourhood in the municipality and district of Kulp, Diyarbakır Province in Turkey. It is populated by Kurds and had a population of 162 in 2022.
