= Kubaş, Manyas =

Village in Turkey

Kubaş
- Neighbourhood
- Location in Turkey Kubaş (Marmara)
- Coordinates: 40°02′N 27°54′E
- Country: Turkey
- Province: Balıkesir
- District: Manyas
- Population (2022): 85
- Time zone: UTC+3 (TRT)

Kubaş is a neighbourhood in the municipality and district of Manyas, Balıkesir Province in Turkey. Its population is 85 (2022).
