= Alaja =

Alaja may refer to:

- Alaja, Turkmenistan, a populated place
- Pertti Alaja, Finnish footballer

== See also ==
- Alaca (disambiguation) (pronounced alaja)
