= Akçasır, Kulp =

Village in Turkey

Akçasır
- Neighbourhood
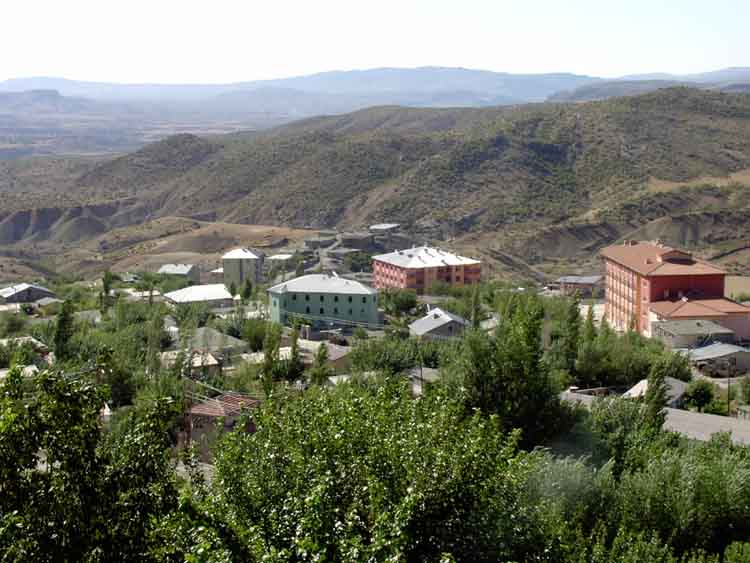

- Location within Turkey
- Coordinates: 38.4476°N 41.2652°E
- Country: Turkey
- Province: Diyarbakır
- District: Kulp
- Population (2022): 617
- Time zone: UTC+3 (TRT)

Akçasır (Kurdish: Axçesêr) is a neighbourhood in the municipality and district of Kulp, Diyarbakır Province in Turkey. It is populated by Kurds and had a population of 617 in 2022.
