= Akdoruk, Kulp =

Village in Turkey

Akdoruk
- Neighbourhood
- Location in Turkey
- Coordinates: 38°34′N 40°56′E
- Country: Turkey
- Province: Diyarbakır
- District: Kulp
- Population (2022): 104
- Time zone: UTC+3 (TRT)

Akdoruk (Kurdish: Gagvas) is a neighbourhood in the municipality and district of Kulp, Diyarbakır Province in Turkey. It is populated by Kurds and had a population of 104 in 2022.
