= Karabulak, Kulp =

Village in Turkey

Karabulak
- Neighbourhood
- Location in Turkey
- Coordinates: 38.5357°N 41.0927°E
- Country: Turkey
- Province: Diyarbakır
- District: Kulp
- Population (2022): 300
- Time zone: UTC+3 (TRT)

Karabulak (Armenian: Ներջիկ, romanized: Nerdjik, Kurdish: Nêrçik) is a neighbourhood in the municipality and district of Kulp, Diyarbakır Province in Turkey. It is populated by Kurds and had a population of 300 in 2022.

== Demographics ==
Aharonk/Karlık was a large Armenian village prior to the Armenian genocide, merged into Karabulak/Nerdjik.
