= Çamlıdere, Ankara =

Çamlıdere
- District and municipality
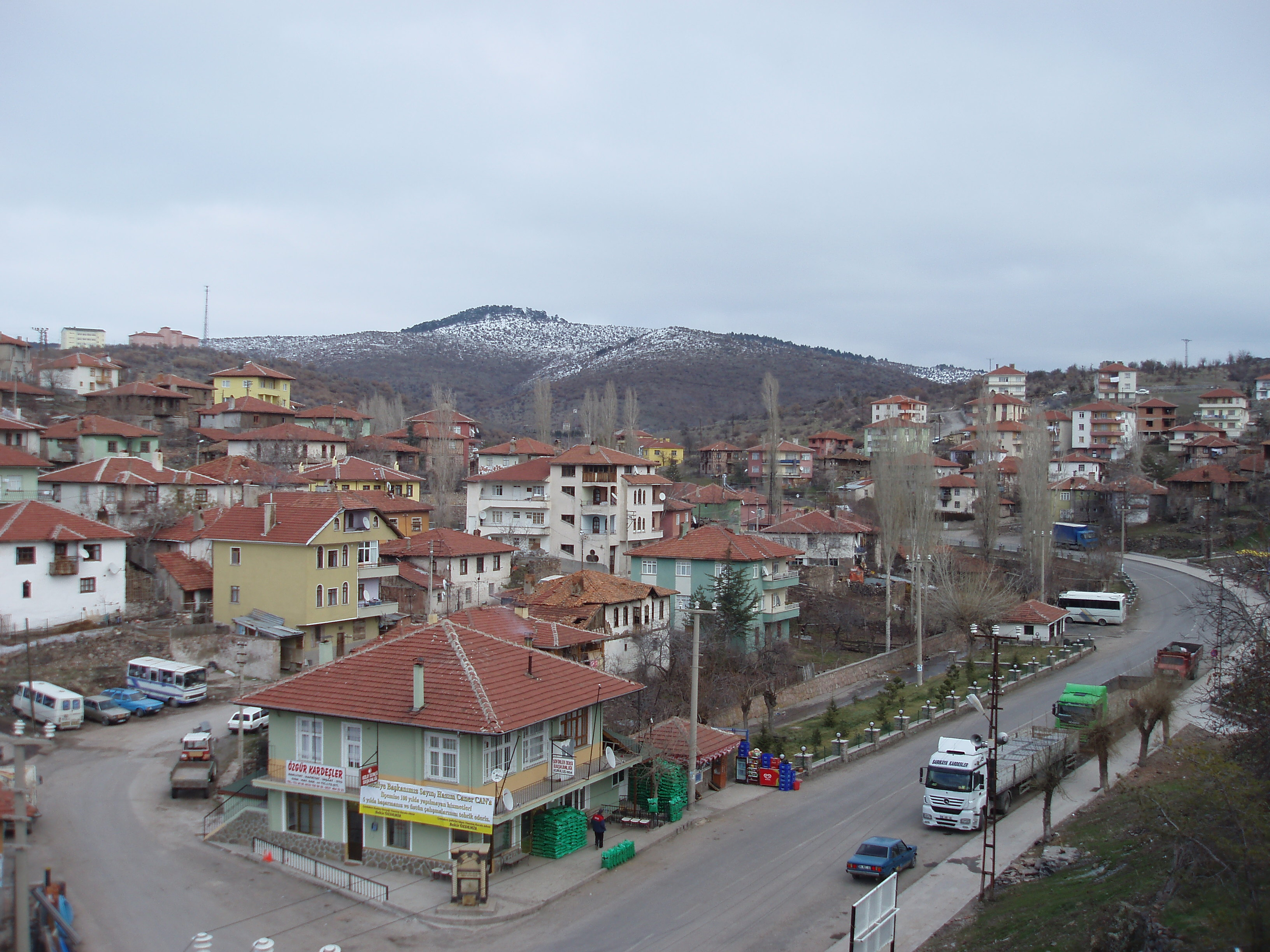

- Map showing Çamlıdere District in Ankara Province

- Location within Turkey Location within Turkey Central Anatolia
- Coordinates: 40°29′25″N 32°28′43″E
- Country: Turkey
- Province: Ankara

Government
  - Mayor: Adem Ceylan (Ind.)
- Area: 782 km^{2} (302 sq mi)
- Elevation: 1,240 m (4,070 ft)
- Population (2022): 8,100
  - Density: 10/km^{2} (27/sq mi)
- Time zone: UTC+3 (TRT)
- Postal code: 06740
- Area code: 0312
- Website: www.camlidere.bel.tr

Çamlıdere is a municipality and district of Ankara Province, Turkey. Its area is 782 km^{2}, and its population is 8,100 (2022). It is 108 km north-west of the city of Ankara. Its elevation is 1,240 m (4,068 ft).

Çamlıdere was settled by the Seljuk Turks and there are a number of Seljuk period buildings in the area.

Many fossils and a petrified forest have been found in the area.

== Demographics ==
The district of Çamlıdere experienced a rapid depopulation, especially in rural villages, like many other rural and remote areas in Central Anatolia.

Historical population
Year	Pop.	±% p.a.
1965	19,596	—
1980	18,521	−0.38%
1990	19,365	+0.45%
2000	15,339	−2.30%
2007	9,329	−6.86%
2012	6,739	−6.30%
2017	7,389	+1.86%
2022	8,100	+1.85%
Source: TÜIK (2007-2022)

== Composition ==
There are 48 neighbourhoods in Çamlıdere District:

- Ahatlar
- Akkaya
- Alakoç
- Atça
- Avdan
- Avşarlar
- Bardakçılar
- Bayındır
- Beşbeyler
- Beyler
- Bökeler
- Buğralar
- Çamköy
- Çukurören
- Dağkuzören
- Doğancı
- Doğanlar
- Dörtkonak
- Doymuş
- Eldelek
- Elmalı
- Elören
- Elvanlar
- Gümele
- Güney
- İnceöz
- Kayabaşı
- Körler
- Kuşçular
- Kuyubaşı
- Meşeler
- Müsellim
- Muzrupağacın
- Ömerağa
- Örenköy
- Orta
- Osmansin
- Özmüş
- Peçenek
- Pelitçik
- Sarıkavak
- Tatlak
- Yahşihan
- Yahyalar
- Yayalar
- Yediören
- Yılanlı
- Yoncatepe

== Çamlıdere today ==
This is an attractive woodland district with lakes, meadows, a deer park, a scout camp and many other places for camping, walking and picnics. In summertime Çamlıdere is busy with day-trippers from Ankara and there is a growing number of guest-houses for weekenders coming to enjoy the fresh air and open skies. The people in this rural area are typically conservative and religious in outlook.

The summer festival in July features oil-wrestling, music, dance, circumcisions of boys, and pilgrimage to the tomb of Sheikh Ali Semerkandi.

== Places of interest ==
- The country house of former president İsmet İnönü.
