= Necipköy, Manyas =

Village in Turkey

Necipköy
- Neighbourhood
- Location in Turkey Necipköy (Marmara)
- Coordinates: 39.997°N 27.789°E
- Country: Turkey
- Province: Balıkesir
- District: Manyas
- Population (2022): 151
- Time zone: UTC+3 (TRT)

Necipköy is a neighbourhood in the municipality and district of Manyas, Balıkesir Province in Turkey. Its population was 151 in 2022.
