= Kaynak, Kulp =

Village in Turkey

Kaynak
- Neighbourhood
- Location in Turkey
- Coordinates: 38.5222°N 40.9357°E
- Country: Turkey
- Province: Diyarbakır
- District: Kulp
- Population (2022): 159
- Time zone: UTC+3 (TRT)

Kaynak (Armenian: Խոռոչ, romanized: Khoroch, Kurdish: Xuruç) is a neighbourhood in the municipality and district of Kulp, Diyarbakır Province in Turkey. It is populated by Kurds and had a population of 159 in 2022.
