= Çağlayan, Kulp =

Village in Turkey

Çağlayan
- Neighbourhood
- Location in Turkey
- Coordinates: 38.5214°N 40.8234°E
- Country: Turkey
- Province: Diyarbakır
- District: Kulp
- Population (2022): 167
- Time zone: UTC+3 (TRT)

Çağlayan (Kurdish: Zara) is a neighbourhood in the municipality and district of Kulp, Diyarbakır Province in Turkey. It is populated by Kurds and had a population of 167 in 2022.
