= Bayındır, Çamlıdere =

Bayındır
- Neighbourhood
- Location in Turkey Bayındır (Turkey Central Anatolia)
- Coordinates: 40.3825°N 32.3329°E
- Country: Turkey
- Province: Ankara
- District: Çamlıdere
- Population (2022): 91
- Time zone: UTC+3 (TRT)

Bayındır is a neighbourhood in the municipality and district of Çamlıdere, Ankara Province, Turkey. Its population is 91 (2022).
