= Taşköprü, Kulp =

Village in Turkey

Taşköprü
- Neighbourhood
- Location in Turkey
- Coordinates: 38°20′43″N 40°55′23″E
- Country: Turkey
- Province: Diyarbakır
- District: Kulp
- Population (2022): 135
- Time zone: UTC+3 (TRT)

Taşköprü (Kurdish: Godernê) is a neighbourhood in the municipality and district of Kulp, Diyarbakır Province in Turkey. It is populated by Kurds and had a population of 135 in 2022.
