= Karakabaağaç, Manyas =

Village in Turkey

Karakabaağaç
- Neighbourhood
- Location in Turkey Karakabaağaç (Marmara)
- Coordinates: 39°58′N 27°49′E
- Country: Turkey
- Province: Balıkesir
- District: Manyas
- Population (2022): 70
- Time zone: UTC+3 (TRT)

Karakabaağaç is a neighbourhood in the municipality and district of Manyas, Balıkesir Province, Turkey. Its population is 70 (2022).
