= Kocagöl, Manyas =

Village in Turkey

Kocagöl
- Neighbourhood
- Location within Turkey Location within Marmara
- Coordinates: 40.155°N 27.842°E
- Country: Turkey
- Province: Balıkesir
- District: Manyas
- Population (2022): 492
- Time zone: UTC+3 (TRT)

Kocagöl is a neighbourhood in the municipality and district of Manyas, Balıkesir Province in Turkey. Its population is 492 (2022).

Nekrasov Cossacks lived there until the 1960s.
