= Hamzalı, Kulp =

Village in Turkey

Hamzalı
- Neighbourhood
- Location in Turkey
- Coordinates: 38°20′45″N 41°10′07″E
- Country: Turkey
- Province: Diyarbakır
- District: Kulp
- Population (2022): 1,253
- Time zone: UTC+3 (TRT)

Hamzalı (Armenian: Շեխհամզա, romanized: Shekhhamza, Kurdish: Şêxhemza) is a neighbourhood in the municipality and district of Kulp, Diyarbakır Province in Turkey. It is populated by Kurds and had a population of 1,253 in 2022.
