= Kıyıkonak, Köprüköy =

Village in Turkey

Kıyıkonak
- Neighbourhood
- Location in Turkey
- Coordinates: 39°55′26″N 41°53′14″E
- Country: Turkey
- Province: Erzurum
- District: Köprüköy
- Population (2022): 220
- Time zone: UTC+3 (TRT)

Kıyıkonak is a neighbourhood in the municipality and district of Köprüköy, Erzurum Province in Turkey. Its population is 220 (2022).
