= Elvanlar, Çamlıdere =

Elvanlar
- Neighbourhood
- Country: Turkey
- Province: Ankara
- District: Çamlıdere
- Population (2022): 78
- Time zone: UTC+3 (TRT)

Elvanlar is a neighbourhood in the municipality and district of Çamlıdere, Ankara Province, Turkey. As of 2022, its population was 78.

== History ==
Research has revealed that the neighborhood's name comes from Elvan Bey, a raider commander. Elvan Bey and his sons, who belonged to the Pecheneg tribe of the Oghuz Turks, went to Istanbul as vanguard units under the direct order of Sultan Mehmed the Conqueror during the conquest of Istanbul. They conducted site surveys and made significant contributions to the preparation of pre-conquest plans, serving the Ottoman army.
