= Narlıca, Kulp =

Village in Turkey

Narlıca
- Neighbourhood
- Location in Turkey
- Coordinates: 38.5248°N 40.9493°E
- Country: Turkey
- Province: Diyarbakır
- District: Kulp
- Population (2022): 285
- Time zone: UTC+3 (TRT)

Narlıca (Armenian: Թիախս, romanized: Tiakhs, Kurdish: Tiyaqs) is a neighbourhood in the municipality and district of Kulp, Diyarbakır Province in Turkey. It is populated by Kurds and had a population of 285 in 2022.
