= Avdan, Çamlıdere =

Avdan
- Neighbourhood
- Location in Turkey Avdan (Turkey Central Anatolia)
- Coordinates: 40°32′N 32°31′E
- Country: Turkey
- Province: Ankara
- District: Çamlıdere
- Population (2022): 142
- Time zone: UTC+3 (TRT)

Avdan is a neighbourhood in the municipality and district of Çamlıdere, Ankara Province, Turkey. Its population is 142 (2022).
