= Akbulak, Kulp =

Village in Turkey

Akbulak
- Neighbourhood
- Location in Turkey
- Coordinates: 38.3934°N 40.9917°E
- Country: Turkey
- Province: Diyarbakır
- District: Kulp
- Population (2022): 709
- Time zone: UTC+3 (TRT)

Akbulak (Kurdish: Kamikan) is a neighbourhood in the municipality and district of Kulp, Diyarbakır Province in Turkey. It is populated by Kurds and had a population of 709 in 2022.
