= Çamlı, Manyas =

Village in Turkey

Çamlı
- Neighbourhood
- Location in Turkey Çamlı (Marmara)
- Coordinates: 40.050°N 28.071°E
- Country: Turkey
- Province: Balıkesir
- District: Manyas
- Population (2022): 363
- Time zone: UTC+3 (TRT)

Çamlı is a neighbourhood in the municipality and district of Manyas, Balıkesir Province in Turkey. Its population is 363 (2022).
