= Eyüpler, Köprüköy =

Village in Turkey

Eyüpler
- Neighbourhood
- Country: Turkey
- Province: Erzurum
- District: Köprüköy
- Population (2022): 328
- Time zone: UTC+3 (TRT)

Eyüpler is a neighbourhood in the municipality and district of Köprüköy, Erzurum Province in Turkey. Its population is 328 (2022).
