= Koçkar, Kulp =

Village in Turkey

Koçksr
- Neighbourhood
- Location in Turkey
- Coordinates: 38°27′36″N 41°13′37″E
- Country: Turkey
- Province: Diyarbakır
- District: Kulp
- Population (2022): 1,042
- Time zone: UTC+3 (TRT)

Koçkar is a neighbourhood in the municipality and district of Kulp, Diyarbakır Province in Turkey. Its population is 1,042 (2022).
