= Ağcaşar, Köprüköy =

Village in Turkey

Ağcaşar
- Neighbourhood
- Location in Turkey
- Coordinates: 39.9155°N 41.9824°E
- Country: Turkey
- Province: Erzurum
- District: Köprüköy
- Population (2022): 678
- Time zone: UTC+3 (TRT)

Ağcaşar is a neighbourhood in the municipality and district of Köprüköy, Erzurum Province in Turkey. Its population is 678 (2022).
