= Kulakköy, Manyas =

Village in Turkey

Kulakköy
- Neighbourhood
- Location in Turkey Kulakköy (Marmara)
- Coordinates: 40.061°N 27.992°E
- Country: Turkey
- Province: Balıkesir
- District: Manyas
- Population (2022): 440
- Time zone: UTC+3 (TRT)

Kulakköy is a neighbourhood in the municipality and district of Manyas, Balıkesir Province in Turkey. Its population is 440 (2022).
