= Muzrupağacın, Çamlıdere =

Muzrupağacın
- Neighbourhood
- Location in Turkey Muzrupağacın (Turkey Central Anatolia)
- Coordinates: 40°27′N 32°26′E
- Country: Turkey
- Province: Ankara
- District: Çamlıdere
- Population (2022): 190
- Time zone: UTC+3 (TRT)

Muzrupağacın is a neighbourhood in the municipality and district of Çamlıdere, Ankara Province, Turkey. As of 2022, its population was 190.
