= Osmansin, Çamlıdere =

Osmansin
- Neighbourhood
- Location in Turkey Osmansin (Turkey Central Anatolia)
- Coordinates: 40°26′N 32°15′E
- Country: Turkey
- Province: Ankara
- District: Çamlıdere
- Population (2022): 288
- Time zone: UTC+3 (TRT)

Osmansin is a neighbourhood in the municipality and district of Çamlıdere, Ankara Province, Turkey. As of 2022, its population was 288.

== Geography ==
Osmansin Village is 140 km from Ankara via the old Istanbul road and 110 km via the highway. It is 30 km from Çamlıdere. Osmansin Village borders the villages of Çukurören, Dağkuzören, Yılanlı, and the Peçenek district.
