= Karataşlar, Köprüköy =

Village in Turkey

Karataşlar
- Neighbourhood
- Location in Turkey
- Coordinates: 39°51′00″N 41°57′44″E
- Country: Turkey
- Province: Erzurum
- District: Köprüköy
- Population (2022): 213
- Time zone: UTC+3 (TRT)

Karataşlar is a neighbourhood in the municipality and district of Köprüköy, Erzurum Province in Turkey. Its population is 213 (2022).
