= Yediören, Çamlıdere =

Yediören
- Neighbourhood
- Location in Turkey Yediören (Turkey Central Anatolia)
- Coordinates: 40°24′N 32°20′E
- Country: Turkey
- Province: Ankara
- District: Çamlıdere
- Population (2022): 54
- Time zone: UTC+3 (TRT)

Yediören is a neighbourhood in the municipality and district of Çamlıdere, Ankara Province, Turkey. As of 2022, its population was 54.
