= Karpuzlu, Kulp =

Village in Turkey

Karpuzlu
- Neighbourhood
- Location in Turkey
- Coordinates: 38.493°N 40.852°E
- Country: Turkey
- Province: Diyarbakır
- District: Kulp
- Population (2022): 898
- Time zone: UTC+3 (TRT)

Karpuzlu (Armenian: Հրդա, romanized: Herda, Kurdish: Herta) is a neighbourhood in the municipality and district of Kulp, Diyarbakır Province in Turkey. It is populated by Kurds and had a population of 898 in 2022.
