= Ataköy, Köprüköy =

Village in Turkey

Ataköy
- Neighbourhood
- Location in Turkey
- Coordinates: 39.7063°N 41.8263°E
- Country: Turkey
- Province: Erzurum
- District: Köprüköy
- Population (2022): 26
- Time zone: UTC+3 (TRT)

Ataköy is a neighbourhood in the municipality and district of Köprüköy, Erzurum Province in Turkey. Its population is 26 (2022).
