= Kamışlı, Kulp =

Village in Turkey

Kamışlı
- Neighbourhood
- Location in Turkey
- Coordinates: 38.429°N 40.932°E
- Country: Turkey
- Province: Diyarbakır
- District: Kulp
- Population (2022): 764
- Time zone: UTC+3 (TRT)

Kamışlı (Kurdish: Zilek) is a neighbourhood in the municipality and district of Kulp, Diyarbakır Province in Turkey. It is populated by Kurds and had a population of 764 in 2022.
