= Doymuş, Çamlıdere =

Doymuş
- Neighbourhood
- Country: Turkey
- Province: Ankara
- District: Çamlıdere
- Population (2022): 65
- Time zone: UTC+3 (TRT)

Doymuş is a neighbourhood in the municipality and district of Çamlıdere, Ankara Province, Turkey. Its population is 65 (2022).
