= Bayırköy, Kulp =

Village in Turkey

Bayırköy
- Neighbourhood
- Location in Turkey
- Coordinates: 38.3746°N 40.9598°E
- Country: Turkey
- Province: Diyarbakır
- District: Kulp
- Population (2022): 108
- Time zone: UTC+3 (TRT)

Bayırköy (Kurdish: Dinar) is a neighbourhood in the municipality and district of Kulp, Diyarbakır Province in Turkey. It is populated by Kurds and had a population of 108 in 2022.
