= Gölçayır, Köprüköy =

Village in Turkey

Gölçayır
- Neighbourhood
- Location in Turkey
- Coordinates: 39.863°N 41.915°E
- Country: Turkey
- Province: Erzurum
- District: Köprüköy
- Population (2022): 325
- Time zone: UTC+3 (TRT)

Gölçayır is a neighbourhood in the municipality and district of Köprüköy, Erzurum Province in Turkey. Its population is 325 (2022).
