= Argunköy, Kulp =

Village in Turkey

Argunköy
- Neighbourhood
- Location in Turkey
- Coordinates: 38°29′N 41°05′E
- Country: Turkey
- Province: Diyarbakır
- District: Kulp
- Population (2022): 433
- Time zone: UTC+3 (TRT)

Argunköy (Armenian: Շողեք, romanized: Shughek, Kurdish: Şirnas) is a neighbourhood in the municipality and district of Kulp, Diyarbakır Province in Turkey. It is populated by Kurds and had a population of 433 in 2022.

Before the Armenian genocide, Shughek was a large Armenian village.
