= Yukarısöğütlü, Köprüköy =

Village in Turkey

Yukarısöğütlü
- Neighbourhood
- Location in Turkey
- Coordinates: 40.0063°N 41.9292°E
- Country: Turkey
- Province: Erzurum
- District: Köprüköy
- Population (2022): 32
- Time zone: UTC+3 (TRT)

Yukarısöğütlü is a neighbourhood in the municipality and district of Köprüköy, Erzurum Province in Turkey. Its population is 32 (2022).
