= Topçu, Köprüköy =

Village in Turkey

Topçu
- Neighbourhood
- Location in Turkey
- Coordinates: 39.7898°N 41.9081°E
- Country: Turkey
- Province: Erzurum
- District: Köprüköy
- Population (2022): 126
- Time zone: UTC+3 (TRT)

Topçu is a neighbourhood in the municipality and district of Köprüköy, Erzurum Province in Turkey. Its population is 126 (2022).
