= Eldelek, Çamlıdere =

Eldelek
- Neighbourhood
- Location in Turkey Eldelek (Turkey Central Anatolia)
- Coordinates: 40.4779°N 32.3692°E
- Country: Turkey
- Province: Ankara
- District: Çamlıdere
- Population (2022): 115
- Time zone: UTC+3 (TRT)

Eldelek is a neighbourhood in the municipality and district of Çamlıdere, Ankara Province, Turkey. As of 2022, its population was 115.
