= Akçaova, Manyas =

Village in Turkey

Akçaova
- Neighbourhood
- Location in Turkey Akçaova (Marmara)
- Coordinates: 40.121°N 27.854°E
- Country: Turkey
- Province: Balıkesir
- District: Manyas
- Population (2022): 474
- Time zone: UTC+3 (TRT)

Akçaova is a neighbourhood in the municipality and district of Manyas, Balıkesir Province in Turkey. Its population is 474 (2022).

== History ==
The former name of the village was Deydin.
