= Dağkuzören, Çamlıdere =

Dağkuzören
- Neighbourhood
- Location in Turkey Dağkuzören (Turkey Central Anatolia)
- Coordinates: 40°25′N 32°13′E
- Country: Turkey
- Province: Ankara
- District: Çamlıdere
- Population (2022): 177
- Time zone: UTC+3 (TRT)

Dağkuzören is a neighbourhood in the municipality and district of Çamlıdere, Ankara Province, Turkey. Its population is 177 (2022).
