= Yeniköy, Manyas =

Village in Turkey

Yeniköy
- Neighbourhood
- Location in Turkey Yeniköy (Marmara)
- Coordinates: 40.096°N 28.064°E
- Country: Turkey
- Province: Balıkesir
- District: Manyas
- Population (2022): 241
- Time zone: UTC+3 (TRT)

Yeniköy is a neighbourhood in the municipality and district of Manyas, Balıkesir Province in Turkey. Its population is 241 (2022).
