= Kurudere, Kulp =

Village in Turkey

Kurudere
- Neighbourhood
- Location in Turkey
- Coordinates: 38°27′14″N 40°54′04″E
- Country: Turkey
- Province: Diyarbakır
- District: Kulp
- Population (2022): 129
- Time zone: UTC+3 (TRT)

Kurudere (Armenian: Քարիք, romanized: Karik, Kurdish: Kerrka) is a neighbourhood in the municipality and district of Kulp, Diyarbakır Province in Turkey. It is populated by Kurds and had a population of 129 in 2022.
