= Ahatlar, Çamlıdere =

Ahatlar
- Neighbourhood
- Location in Turkey Ahatlar (Turkey Central Anatolia)
- Coordinates: 40.4915°N 32.4107°E
- Country: Turkey
- Province: Ankara
- District: Çamlıdere
- Population (2022): 95
- Time zone: UTC+3 (TRT)

Ahatlar is a neighbourhood in the municipality and district of Çamlıdere, Ankara Province, Turkey. Its population is 95 (2022).
