= Bökeler, Çamlıdere =

Bökeler
- Neighbourhood
- Location in Turkey Bökeler (Turkey Central Anatolia)
- Coordinates: 40°27′N 32°20′E
- Country: Turkey
- Province: Ankara
- District: Çamlıdere
- Population (2022): 126
- Time zone: UTC+3 (TRT)

Bökeler is a neighbourhood in the municipality and district of Çamlıdere, Ankara Province, Turkey. Its population is 126 (2022).
