= Kayacık, Kulp =

Village in Turkey

Kayacık
- Neighbourhood
- Location in Turkey
- Coordinates: 38.5642°N 41.2072°E
- Country: Turkey
- Province: Diyarbakır
- District: Kulp
- Population (2022): 187
- Time zone: UTC+3 (TRT)

Kayacık (Kurdish: Înikan) is a neighbourhood in the municipality and district of Kulp, Diyarbakır Province in Turkey. It is populated by Kurds and had a population of 187 in 2022.
