= Üçkuyu, Kulp =

Village in Turkey

Üçkuyu
- Neighbourhood
- Location in Turkey
- Coordinates: 38°20′02″N 41°03′52″E
- Country: Turkey
- Province: Diyarbakır
- District: Kulp
- Population (2022): 132
- Time zone: UTC+3 (TRT)

Üçkuyu (Kurdish: Araşkan) is a neighbourhood in the municipality and district of Kulp, Diyarbakır Province in Turkey. It is populated by Kurds and had a population of 132 in 2022.
