= Yoncatepe, Çamlıdere =

Yoncatepe
- Neighbourhood
- Location in Turkey Yoncatepe (Turkey Central Anatolia)
- Coordinates: 40°26′N 32°19′E
- Country: Turkey
- Province: Ankara
- District: Çamlıdere
- Population (2022): 141
- Time zone: UTC+3 (TRT)

Yoncatepe is a neighbourhood in the municipality and district of Çamlıdere, Ankara Province, Turkey. Its population is 141 (2022).
