= Aşağıkızılkale, Köprüköy =

Village in Turkey

Aşağıkızılkale
- Neighbourhood
- Location in Turkey
- Coordinates: 39°42′N 41°47′E
- Country: Turkey
- Province: Erzurum
- District: Köprüköy
- Population (2022): 130
- Time zone: UTC+3 (TRT)

Aşağıkızılkale is a neighbourhood in the municipality and district of Köprüköy, Erzurum Province in Turkey. Its population is 130 (2022).
