= Gümele, Çamlıdere =

Gümele
- Neighbourhood
- Location in Turkey Gümele (Turkey Central Anatolia)
- Coordinates: 40.3841°N 32.3008°E
- Country: Turkey
- Province: Ankara
- District: Çamlıdere
- Population (2022): 66
- Time zone: UTC+3 (TRT)

Gümele is a neighbourhood in the municipality and district of Çamlıdere, Ankara Province, Turkey. As of 2022, its population was 66.
