= Derebaşı, Köprüköy =

Village in Turkey

Derebaşı
- Neighbourhood
- Country: Turkey
- Province: Erzurum
- District: Köprüköy
- Population (2022): 88
- Time zone: UTC+3 (TRT)

Derebaşı is a neighbourhood in the municipality and district of Köprüköy, Erzurum Province in Turkey. Its population is 88 (2022).
