= Tepecik, Manyas =

Village in Turkey

Tepecik
- Neighbourhood
- Location in Turkey Tepecik (Marmara)
- Coordinates: 40.067°N 28.048°E
- Country: Turkey
- Province: Balıkesir
- District: Manyas
- Population (2022): 212
- Time zone: UTC+3 (TRT)

Tepecik is a neighbourhood in the municipality and district of Manyas, Balıkesir Province in Turkey. Its population is 212 (2022).
