= İnkaya, Kulp =

Village in Turkey

İnkaya
- Neighbourhood
- Location in Turkey
- Coordinates: 38.3458°N 41.0437°E
- Country: Turkey
- Province: Diyarbakır
- District: Kulp
- Population (2022): 178
- Time zone: UTC+3 (TRT)

İnkaya (Kurdish: Kanikan) is a neighbourhood in the municipality and district of Kulp, Diyarbakır Province in Turkey. It is populated by Kurds and had a population of 178 in 2022.

In 2025, archaeologists uncovered a church which is believed to date back to the reign of Roman Emperor Constantius II. Excavations, which began in 2021, have revealed numerous graves and artifacts. The discoveries confirm that the Byzantine Empire maintained a strong and lasting presence beyond the Euphrates and that Christianity had taken root in the area much earlier than previously believed. Researchers expect further discoveries that could push the church's history even further back.
