= Buğralar, Çamlıdere =

Buğralar
- Neighbourhood
- Location in Turkey Buğralar (Turkey Central Anatolia)
- Coordinates: 40°26′N 32°26′E
- Country: Turkey
- Province: Ankara
- District: Çamlıdere
- Population (2022): 362
- Time zone: UTC+3 (TRT)

Buğralar is a neighbourhood in the municipality and district of Çamlıdere, Ankara Province, Turkey. Its population is 362 (2022).
