= Çal, Manyas =

Village in Turkey

Çal
- Neighbourhood
- Location in Turkey Çal (Marmara)
- Coordinates: 40.023°N 27.940°E
- Country: Turkey
- Province: Balıkesir
- District: Manyas
- Population (2022): 152
- Time zone: UTC+3 (TRT)

Çal is a neighbourhood in the municipality and district of Manyas, Balıkesir Province in Turkey. Its population is 152 (2022).
