= İslamköy, Kulp =

Village in Turkey

İslamköy
- Neighbourhood
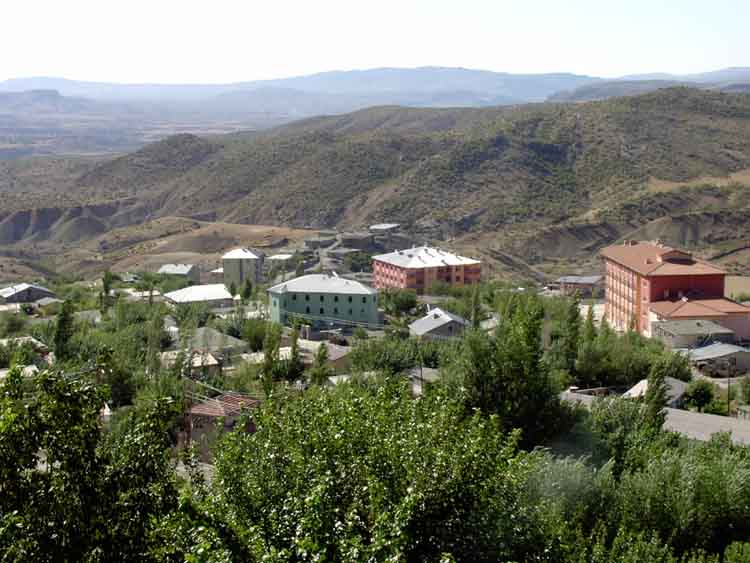
- Kulp

- Location within Turkey
- Coordinates: 38.5766°N 40.9747°E
- Country: Turkey
- Province: Diyarbakır
- District: Kulp
- Population (2022): 388
- Time zone: UTC+3 (TRT)

İslamköy (Kurdish: Kuyê) is a neighbourhood in the municipality and district of Kulp, Diyarbakır Province in Turkey. It is populated by Kurds and had a population of 388 in 2022.
