= Çullu, Köprüköy =

Village in Turkey

Çullu
- Neighbourhood
- Location in Turkey
- Coordinates: 39.748°N 41.867°E
- Country: Turkey
- Province: Erzurum
- District: Köprüköy
- Population (2022): 877
- Time zone: UTC+3 (TRT)

Çullu is a neighbourhood in the municipality and district of Köprüköy, Erzurum Province in Turkey. Its population is 877 (2022).
