= Dereköy, Manyas =

Village in Turkey

Dereköy
- Neighbourhood
- Location in Turkey Dereköy (Marmara)
- Coordinates: 40.068°N 27.885°E
- Country: Turkey
- Province: Balıkesir
- District: Manyas
- Population (2022): 65
- Time zone: UTC+3 (TRT)

Dereköy is a neighbourhood in the municipality and district of Manyas, Balıkesir Province in Turkey. Its population is 65 (2022).
