= Örentaş, Köprüköy =

Village in Turkey

Örentaş
- Neighbourhood
- Location in Turkey
- Coordinates: 40°05′06″N 41°51′36″E
- Country: Turkey
- Province: Erzurum
- District: Köprüköy
- Population (2022): 79
- Time zone: UTC+3 (TRT)

Örentaş is a neighbourhood in the municipality and district of Köprüköy, Erzurum Province in Turkey. Its population is 79 (2022).
