= Başbuğ, Kulp =

Village in Turkey

Başbuğ
- Neighbourhood
- Location in Turkey
- Coordinates: 38°18′N 41°06′E
- Country: Turkey
- Province: Diyarbakır
- District: Kulp
- Population (2022): 911
- Time zone: UTC+3 (TRT)

Başbuğ (Kurdish: Reşikan) is a neighbourhood in the municipality and district of Kulp, Diyarbakır Province in Turkey. It is populated by Kurds and had a population of 911 in 2022.
