= Barın, Kulp =

Village in Turkey

Barın
- Neighbourhood
- Location in Turkey
- Coordinates: 38°20′N 41°01′E
- Country: Turkey
- Province: Diyarbakır
- District: Kulp
- Population (2022): 59
- Time zone: UTC+3 (TRT)

Barın (Kurdish: Barin) is a neighbourhood in the municipality and district of Kulp, Diyarbakır Province in Turkey. It is populated by Kurds and had a population of 59 in 2022.
