= Cumhuriyet, Manyas =

Village in Turkey

Cumhuriyet
- Neighbourhood
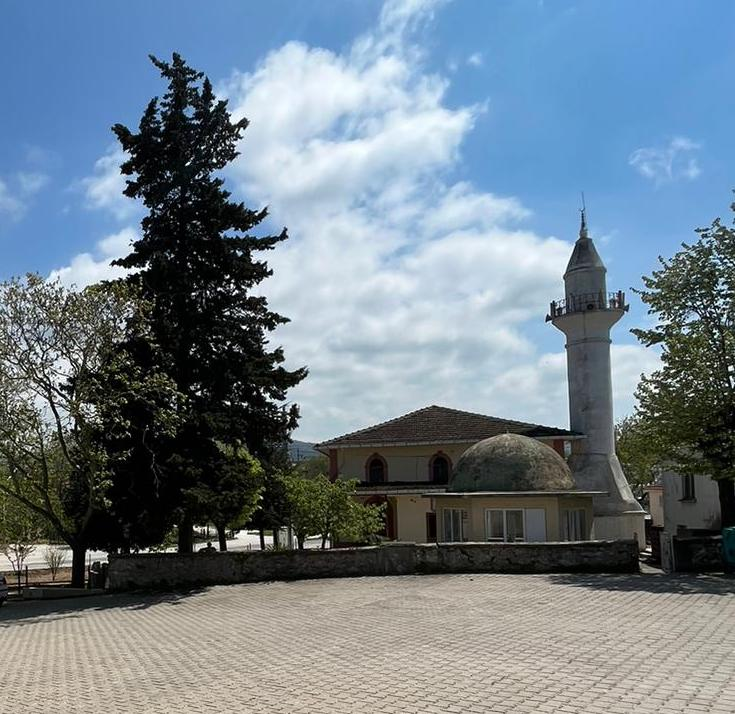
- Georgian village of Cumhuriyet (former Sultaniye) in Manyas, Balıkesir.

- Location within Turkey Location within Marmara
- Coordinates: 40.012°N 27.973°E
- Country: Turkey
- Province: Balıkesir
- District: Manyas
- Population (2022): 157
- Time zone: UTC+3 (TRT)

Cumhuriyet is a neighbourhood in the municipality and district of Manyas, Balıkesir Province in Turkey. Its population is 157 (2022).
