= Peynirkuyusu, Manyas =

Village in Turkey

Peynirkuyusu
- Neighbourhood
- Location in Turkey Peynirkuyusu (Marmara)
- Coordinates: 39°58′N 27°57′E
- Country: Turkey
- Province: Balıkesir
- District: Manyas
- Population (2022): 313
- Time zone: UTC+3 (TRT)

Peynirkuyusu is a neighbourhood in the municipality and district of Manyas, Balıkesir Province in Turkey. Its population is 313 (2022).
