= Kızık, Manyas =

Village in Turkey

Kızık
- Neighbourhood
- Location in Turkey Kızık (Marmara)
- Coordinates: 40°03′06″N 27°56′08″E
- Country: Turkey
- Province: Balıkesir
- District: Manyas
- Population (2022): 341
- Time zone: UTC+3 (TRT)

Kızık is a neighbourhood in the municipality and district of Manyas, Balıkesir Province in Turkey. Its population is 341 (2022).
