= Pekecik, Köprüköy =

Village in Turkey

Pekecik
- Neighbourhood
- Location in Turkey
- Coordinates: 39°53′25″N 41°52′18″E
- Country: Turkey
- Province: Erzurum
- District: Köprüköy
- Population (2022): 60
- Time zone: UTC+3 (TRT)

Pekecik is a neighbourhood in the municipality and district of Köprüköy, Erzurum Province in Turkey. Its population is 60 (2022).
