= Örenköy, Manyas =

Village in Turkey

Örenköy
- Neighbourhood
- Location in Turkey Örenköy (Marmara)
- Coordinates: 39°57′20″N 27°45′44″E
- Country: Turkey
- Province: Balıkesir
- District: Manyas
- Population (2022): 50
- Time zone: UTC+3 (TRT)

Örenköy is a neighbourhood in the municipality and district of Manyas, Balıkesir Province in Turkey. Its population is 50 (2022).
