= Akkaya, Çamlıdere =

Akkaya
- Neighbourhood
- Location in Turkey Akkaya (Turkey Central Anatolia)
- Coordinates: 40.3734°N 32.2774°E
- Country: Turkey
- Province: Ankara
- District: Çamlıdere
- Population (2022): 89
- Time zone: UTC+3 (TRT)

Akkaya is a neighbourhood in the municipality and district of Çamlıdere, Ankara Province, Turkey. Its population is 89 (2022).
