= Hamamlı, Manyas =

Village in Turkey

Hamamlı
- Neighbourhood
- Location in Turkey Hamamlı (Marmara)
- Coordinates: 40.111°N 27.911°E
- Country: Turkey
- Province: Balıkesir
- District: Manyas
- Population (2022): 290
- Time zone: UTC+3 (TRT)

Hamamlı is a neighbourhood in the municipality and district of Manyas, Balıkesir Province in Turkey. Its population is 290 (2022).
