= Tuzlaköy, Kulp =

Village in Turkey

Tuzlaköy
- Neighbourhood
- Location within Turkey
- Coordinates: 38°24′20″N 41°10′58″E
- Country: Turkey
- Province: Diyarbakır
- District: Kulp
- Population (2022): 451
- Time zone: UTC+3 (TRT)

Tuzlaköy (Kurdish: Xerzikan) is a neighbourhood in the municipality and district of Kulp, Diyarbakır Province in Turkey. It is populated by Kurds and had a population of 451 in 2022.
