= Baloğlu, Kulp =

Village in Turkey

Baloğlu
- Neighbourhood
- Location in Turkey
- Coordinates: 38.4684°N 41.1160°E
- Country: Turkey
- Province: Diyarbakır
- District: Kulp
- Population (2022): 763
- Time zone: UTC+3 (TRT)

Baloğlu (Kurdish: Dimilyan) is a neighbourhood in the municipality and district of Kulp, Diyarbakır Province in Turkey. It is populated by Kurds and had a population of 763 in 2022.
