= Çakırca, Manyas =

Village in Turkey

Çakırca
- Neighbourhood
- Location in Turkey Çakırca (Marmara)
- Coordinates: 40°03′49″N 27°50′51″E
- Country: Turkey
- Province: Balıkesir
- District: Manyas
- Population (2022): 276
- Time zone: UTC+3 (TRT)

Çakırca is a neighbourhood in the municipality and district of Manyas, Balıkesir Province in Turkey. Its population is 276 (2022).
