= Kulp, Turkey =

Kulp
- District and municipality
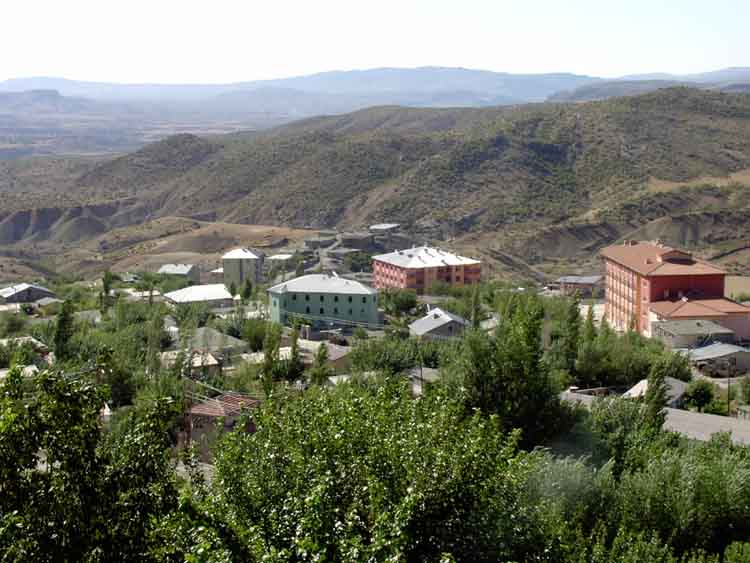
- The city of Kulp

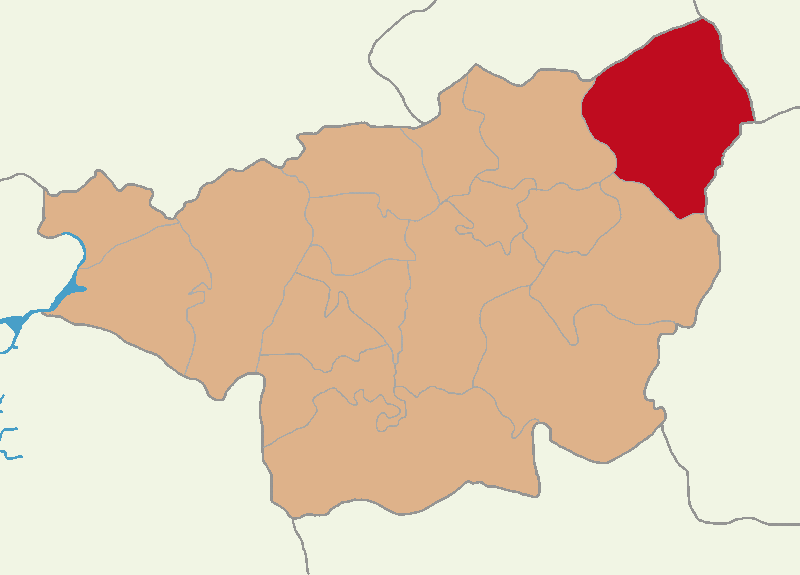
- Map showing Kulp District in Diyarbakır Province

- Location within Turkey
- Coordinates: 38°39′51″N 41°00′24″E
- Country: Turkey
- Province: Diyarbakır
- Area: 1.600 km^{2} (0.618 sq mi)
- Population (2022): 34,357
  - Density: 21,470/km^{2} (55,620/sq mi)
- Time zone: UTC+3 (TRT)
- Postal code: 21900
- Area code: 0412
- Website: www.kulp.bel.tr

Kulp (Kurdish: Pasûr, Ottoman Turkish: قولب, romanized: Qulb, central district: Ottoman Turkish: پاصور, romanized: Pasur, Armenian: Խուլփ, romanized: Khulp) is a municipality and district of Diyarbakır Province, Turkey. Its area is 1,493 km^{2}, and its population is 34,357 (2022). It is populated by Kurds.

== History ==
The Kulp region gained importance as a center for the Kurdish chiefdoms in Kulp itself and nearby Zeyrek (to the west).

In 1993, Kulp was under siege by the Kurdistan Workers' Party (PKK). Inhabitants whom the Turkish Government suspected of siding with the PKK were resettled to Diyarbakır.

== Politics ==
In the local elections on 31 March 2019 Mehmet Fatih Taş of the Peoples' Democratic Party (HDP) was elected Mayor. But he was dismissed by the Ministry of the Interior due to an investigation relating to a terrorist attack. Kaymakam Mustafa Gözlet acts as a trustee instead.

== Demographics ==
Until the 15th century, the area was inhabited by Armenians only. Then nomadic Kurdish tribes started to settle in the area. On the eve of the First World War, more than 5,000 Armenians lived in the kaza, especially in:

- Endzakar (Ընձաքարի, now Ağaçkorur): 140 inhabitants,
- Gazken (now Ağaçlı): 2,000 houses, 100 Armenians,
- Aharonk (now Karabulak),
- Ehub (Eyub, now Yaylak),
- Geghervank (Geghervan, Yüklüce in Turkish, merged with Ağaçkorur),
- Shughek (now Argunköy),
- Pasur (now Kulp proper): rural town with 40 Armenian and 40 Kurdish houses.

Many Armenians converted to Islam and were linguistically Kurdified. Many of them joined the Kurdish movement.

== Culture ==
Some Armenian cultural features have been preserved such as Armenian dances and Armenian cuisine.

== Composition ==
There are 58 neighbourhoods in Kulp District:

- Ağaçkorur
- Ağaçlı
- Ağıllı
- Akbulak
- Akçasır
- Akdoruk
- Alaca
- Argunköy
- Aşağıelmalı
- Aygün
- Ayhanköy
- Bağcılar
- Baloğlu
- Barın
- Başbuğ
- Bayırköy
- Çağlayan
- Çukurca
- Demirli
- Dolun
- Düzce
- Güleç
- Güllük
- Hamzalı
- İnkaya
- İslamköy
- Kamışlı
- Karaağaç
- Karabulak
- Karaorman
- Karpuzlu
- Kayacık
- Kayahan
- Kaynak
- Koçkar
- Konuklu
- Kurudere
- Merkez Eski
- Merkez Yeni
- Narlıca
- Özbek
- Salkımlı
- Saltukköy
- Taşköprü
- Temren
- Tepecik
- Turgut Özal
- Tuzlaköy
- Üçkuyu
- Ünal
- Uygur
- Uzunova
- Yakıtköy
- Yayıkköy
- Yaylak
- Yeşilköy
- Yuvacık
- Zeyrek
