= Doğanlar, Çamlıdere =

Doğanlar
- Neighbourhood
- Location in Turkey Doğanlar (Turkey Central Anatolia)
- Coordinates: 40.481°N 32.353°E
- Country: Turkey
- Province: Ankara
- District: Çamlıdere
- Population (2022): 249
- Time zone: UTC+3 (TRT)

Doğanlar is a neighbourhood in the municipality and district of Çamlıdere, Ankara Province, Turkey. Its population is 249 (2022).
