= Yılanlı, Köprüköy =

Village in Turkey

Yılanlı
- Neighbourhood
- Country: Turkey
- Province: Erzurum
- District: Köprüköy
- Population (2022): 137
- Time zone: UTC+3 (TRT)

Yılanlı is a neighbourhood in the municipality and district of Köprüköy, Erzurum Province in Turkey. Its population is 137 (2022).

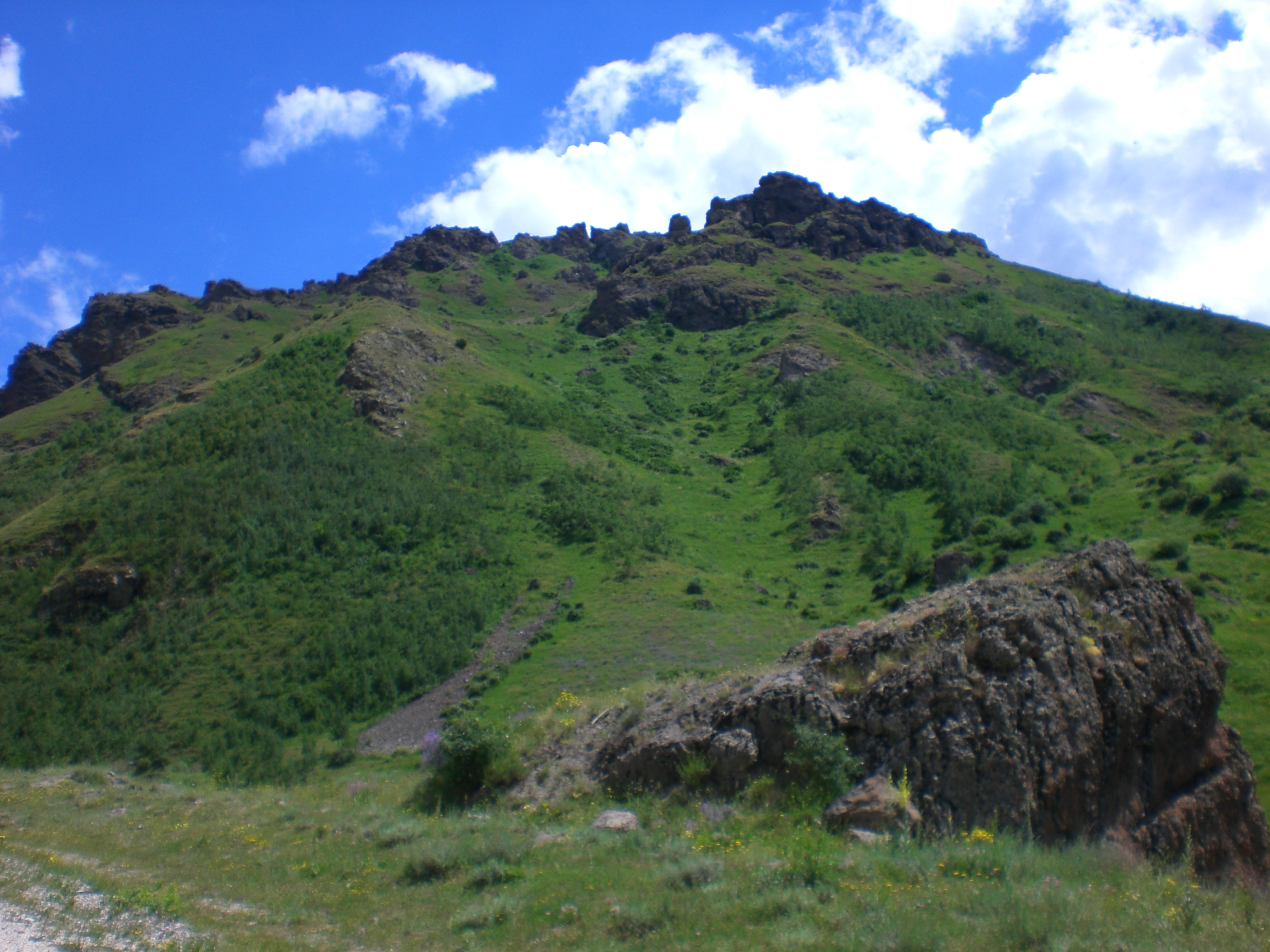
Yılanlı landscape
