= Kalfa, Manyas =

Village in Turkey

Kalfa
- Neighbourhood
- Location in Turkey Kalfa (Marmara)
- Coordinates: 39.993°N 27.931°E
- Country: Turkey
- Province: Balıkesir
- District: Manyas
- Population (2022): 60
- Time zone: UTC+3 (TRT)

Kalfa is a neighbourhood in the municipality and district of Manyas, Balıkesir Province in Turkey. Its population is 60 (2022).
