= Uzunova, Kulp =

Village in Turkey

Uzunova
- Neighbourhood
- Location in Turkey
- Coordinates: 38°22′28″N 41°07′18″E
- Country: Turkey
- Province: Diyarbakır
- District: Kulp
- Population (2022): 928
- Time zone: UTC+3 (TRT)

Uzunova (Armenian: Ջումարա, romanized: Jumara, Kurdish: Cumar) is a neighbourhood in the municipality and district of Kulp, Diyarbakır Province in Turkey. It is populated by Kurds and had a population of 928 in 2022.
