= Pelitçik, Çamlıdere =

Pelitçik
- Neighbourhood
- Country: Turkey
- Province: Ankara
- District: Çamlıdere
- Population (2022): 156
- Time zone: UTC+3 (TRT)

Pelitçik is a neighbourhood in the municipality and district of Çamlıdere, Ankara Province, Turkey. As of 2022, its population was 156.
