= Çukurören, Çamlıdere =

Çukurören
- Neighbourhood
- Location in Turkey Çukurören (Turkey Central Anatolia)
- Coordinates: 40.467°N 32.247°E
- Country: Turkey
- Province: Ankara
- District: Çamlıdere
- Population (2022): 226
- Time zone: UTC+3 (TRT)

Çukurören is a neighbourhood in the municipality and district of Çamlıdere, Ankara Province, Turkey. Its population is 226 (2022).
