= Doğancı, Manyas =

Village in Turkey

Doğancı
- Neighbourhood
- Location in Turkey Doğancı (Marmara)
- Coordinates: 40.075°N 27.799°E
- Country: Turkey
- Province: Balıkesir
- District: Manyas
- Population (2022): 54
- Time zone: UTC+3 (TRT)

Doğancı is a neighbourhood in the municipality and district of Manyas, Balıkesir Province in Turkey. Its population is 54 (2022).
