= Kayaca, Manyas =

Village in Turkey

Kayaca
- Neighbourhood
- Location in Turkey Kayaca (Marmara)
- Coordinates: 40.070°N 27.964°E
- Country: Turkey
- Province: Balıkesir
- District: Manyas
- Population (2022): 178
- Time zone: UTC+3 (TRT)

Kayaca is a neighbourhood in the municipality and district of Manyas, Balıkesir Province in Turkey. Its population is 178 (2022).
