= Aygün, Kulp =

Village in Turkey

Aygün
- Neighbourhood
- Location in Turkey
- Coordinates: 38°26′N 41°15′E
- Country: Turkey
- Province: Diyarbakır
- District: Kulp
- Population (2022): 1,371
- Time zone: UTC+3 (TRT)

Aygün (Kurdish: Mehmedkan) is a neighbourhood in the municipality and district of Kulp, Diyarbakır Province in Turkey. It is populated by Kurds and had a population of 1,371 in 2022.
