= Alaca, Kulp =

Village in Turkey

Alaca
- Neighbourhood
- Location in Turkey
- Coordinates: 38.6069°N 41.1769°E
- Country: Turkey
- Province: Diyarbakır
- District: Kulp
- Population (2022): 209
- Time zone: UTC+3 (TRT)

Alaca (Armenian: Կըրնկան, romanized: Kregan/Kerikan/Kerengan/Kurungan, Kurdish: Nederan) is a neighbourhood in the municipality and district of Kulp, Diyarbakır Province in Turkey. It is populated by Kurds and had a population of 209 in 2022.

Kregan/Kerikan had 34 Armenians, 3 houses, and one church before the Armenian genocide.
