= Boğazpınar, Manyas =

Village in Turkey

Boğazpınar
- Neighbourhood
- Location in Turkey Boğazpınar (Marmara)
- Coordinates: 40.021°N 28.018°E
- Country: Turkey
- Province: Balıkesir
- District: Manyas
- Population (2022): 495
- Time zone: UTC+3 (TRT)

Boğazpınar is a neighbourhood in the municipality and district of Manyas, Balıkesir Province in Turkey. Its population is 495 (2022).
