= Kuşçular, Tarsus =

Kuşçular
- Neighbourhood
- Location in Turkey
- Coordinates: 37°16′N 34°57′E
- Country: Turkey
- Province: Mersin
- District: Tarsus
- Elevation: 985 m (3,232 ft)
- Population (2022): 187
- Time zone: UTC+3 (TRT)
- Area code: 0324

Kuşçular is a neighbourhood in the municipality and district of Tarsus, Mersin Province, Turkey. Its population is 187 (2022). It is situated in the Toros Mountains. It is located 70 kilometres (43 mi) away from Tarsus and 100 kilometres (62 mi) away from Mersin.
