= Meşeler, Çamlıdere =

Meşeler
- Neighbourhood
- Location in Turkey Meşeler (Turkey Central Anatolia)
- Coordinates: 40.4898°N 32.4484°E
- Country: Turkey
- Province: Ankara
- District: Çamlıdere
- Population (2022): 75
- Time zone: UTC+3 (TRT)

Meşeler is a neighbourhood in the municipality and district of Çamlıdere, Ankara Province, Turkey. As of 2022, its population was 75.
