= Çamköy, Çamlıdere =

Çamköy
- Neighbourhood
- Country: Turkey
- Province: Ankara
- District: Çamlıdere
- Population (2022): 108
- Time zone: UTC+3 (TRT)

Çamköy is a neighbourhood in the municipality and district of Çamlıdere, Ankara Province, Turkey. Its population is 108 (2022).
