= Kuşçular, Çamlıdere =

Kuşçular
- Neighbourhood
- Location in Turkey Kuşçular (Turkey Central Anatolia)
- Coordinates: 40.5478°N 32.4982°E
- Country: Turkey
- Province: Ankara
- District: Çamlıdere
- Population (2022): 113
- Time zone: UTC+3 (TRT)

Kuşçular is a neighbourhood in the municipality and district of Çamlıdere, Ankara Province, Turkey. As of 2022, its population was 113.
