= Eskimanyas, Manyas =

Village in Turkey

Eskimanyas
- Neighbourhood
- Location within Turkey Location within Marmara
- Coordinates: 40.01°N 28.05°E
- Country: Turkey
- Province: Balıkesir
- District: Manyas
- Population (2022): 177
- Time zone: UTC+3 (TRT)

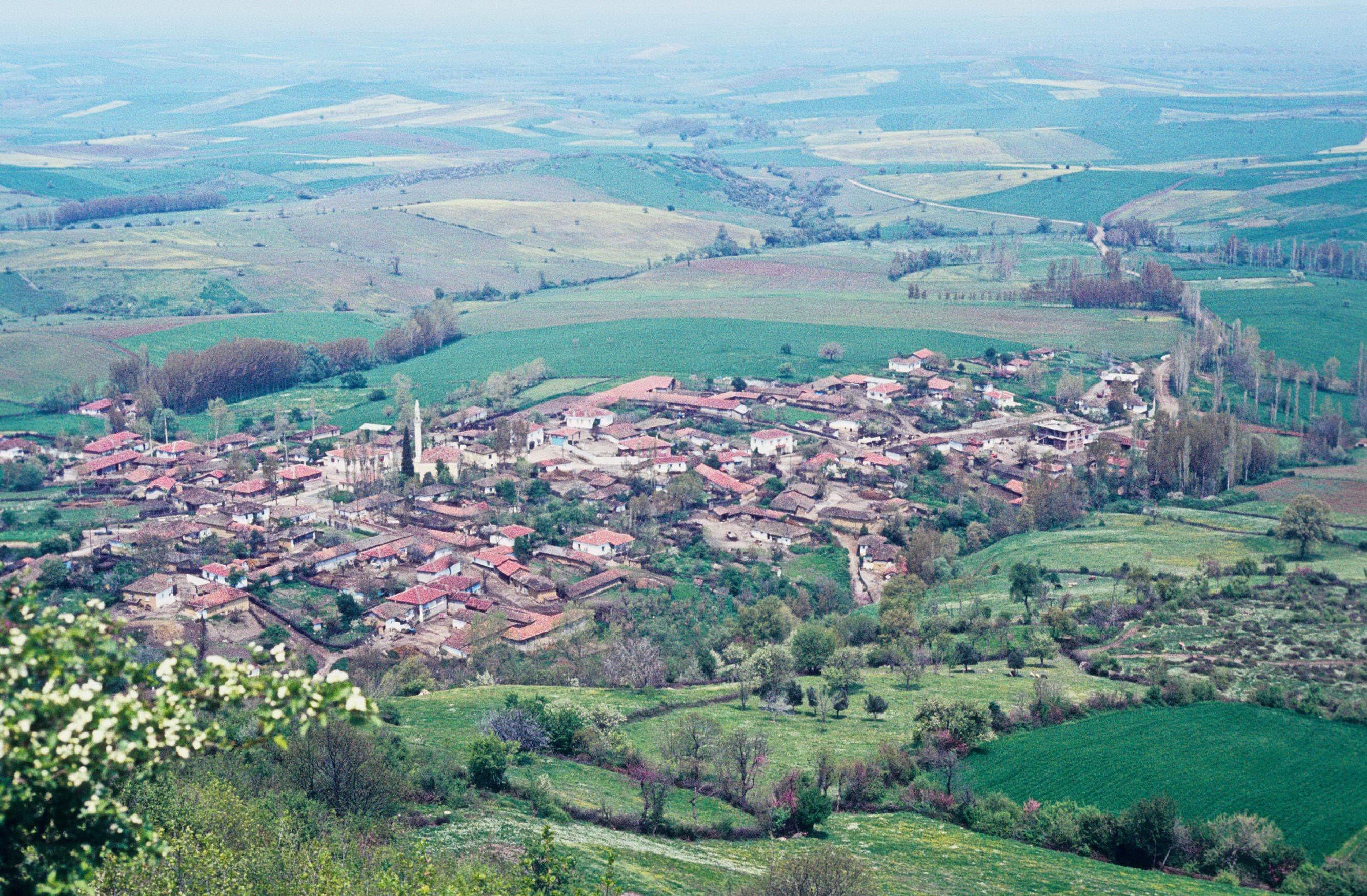
Eskimanyas (Soğuksu), 1984

Eskimanyas (formerly: Soğuksu) is a neighbourhood in the municipality and district of Manyas, Balıkesir Province in Turkey. Its population is 177 (2022).
