= Akkaya Dam =

Dam in Niğde Province, Turkey

Coordinates: 37.9196°N 34.608°E

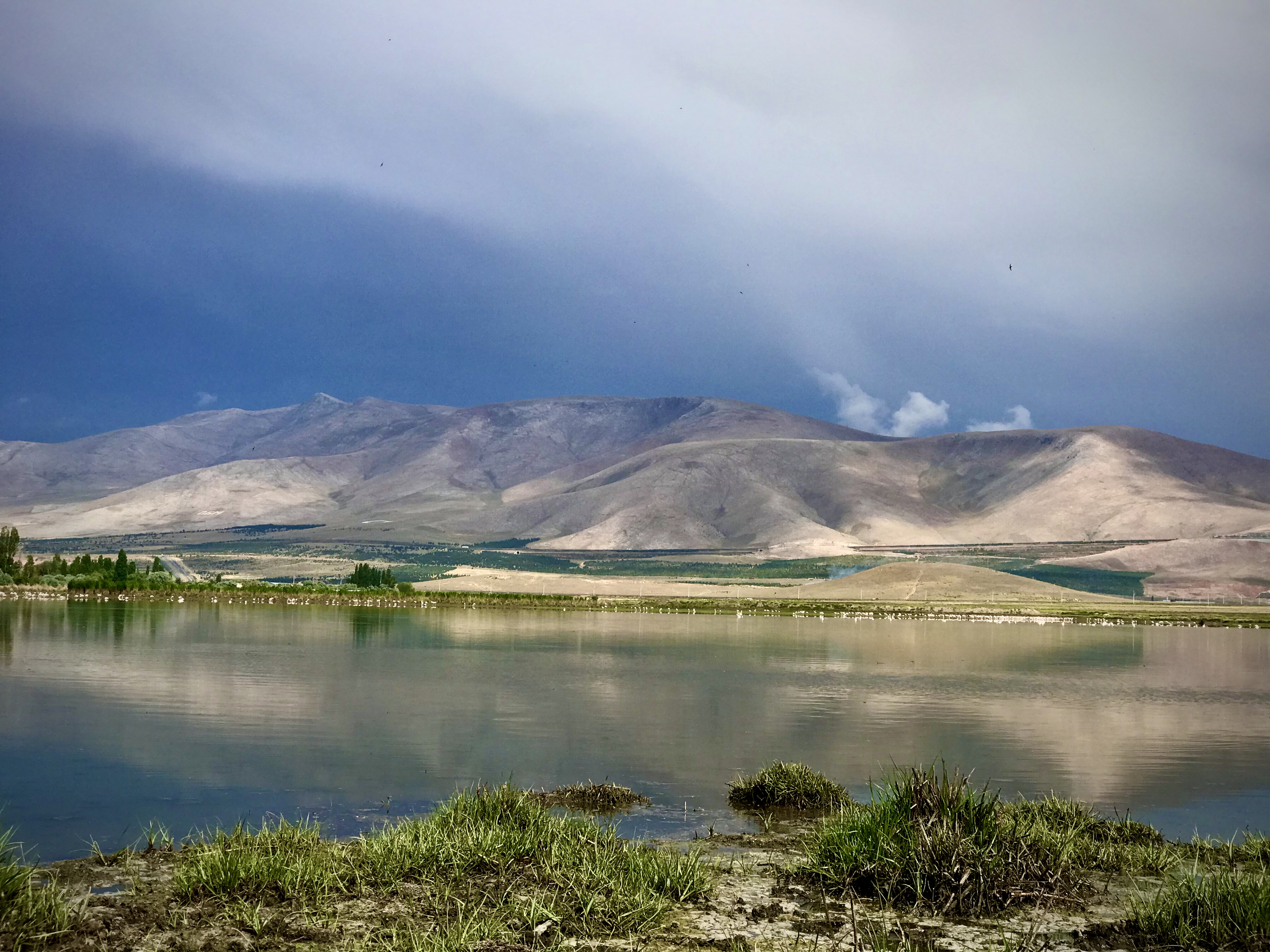
- Interactive map of Akkaya Dam
- Location: Turkey
- Construction began: 1964
- Opening date: 1967

Dam and spillways
- Type of dam: Earth-fill

Akkaya Dam is a dam located in Niğde Province, Turkey, and was built between 1964 and 1967.

== See also ==
- List of dams and reservoirs in Turkey
