= Bardakçılar, Çamlıdere =

Bardakçılar
- Neighbourhood
- Location in Turkey Bardakçılar (Turkey Central Anatolia)
- Coordinates: 40.5209°N 32.5247°E
- Country: Turkey
- Province: Ankara
- District: Çamlıdere
- Population (2022): 71
- Time zone: UTC+3 (TRT)

Bardakçılar is a neighbourhood in the municipality and district of Çamlıdere, Ankara Province, Turkey. Its population is 71 (2022).
