= Alakoç, Çamlıdere =

Alakoç
- Neighbourhood
- Location in Turkey Alakoç (Turkey Central Anatolia)
- Coordinates: 40.5584°N 32.4773°E
- Country: Turkey
- Province: Ankara
- District: Çamlıdere
- Population (2022): 130
- Time zone: UTC+3 (TRT)

Alakoç is a neighbourhood in the municipality and district of Çamlıdere, Ankara Province, Turkey. Its population is 130 (2022).
