= Meisamia =

Meisamia مېيٛسەمييٛە
- Village
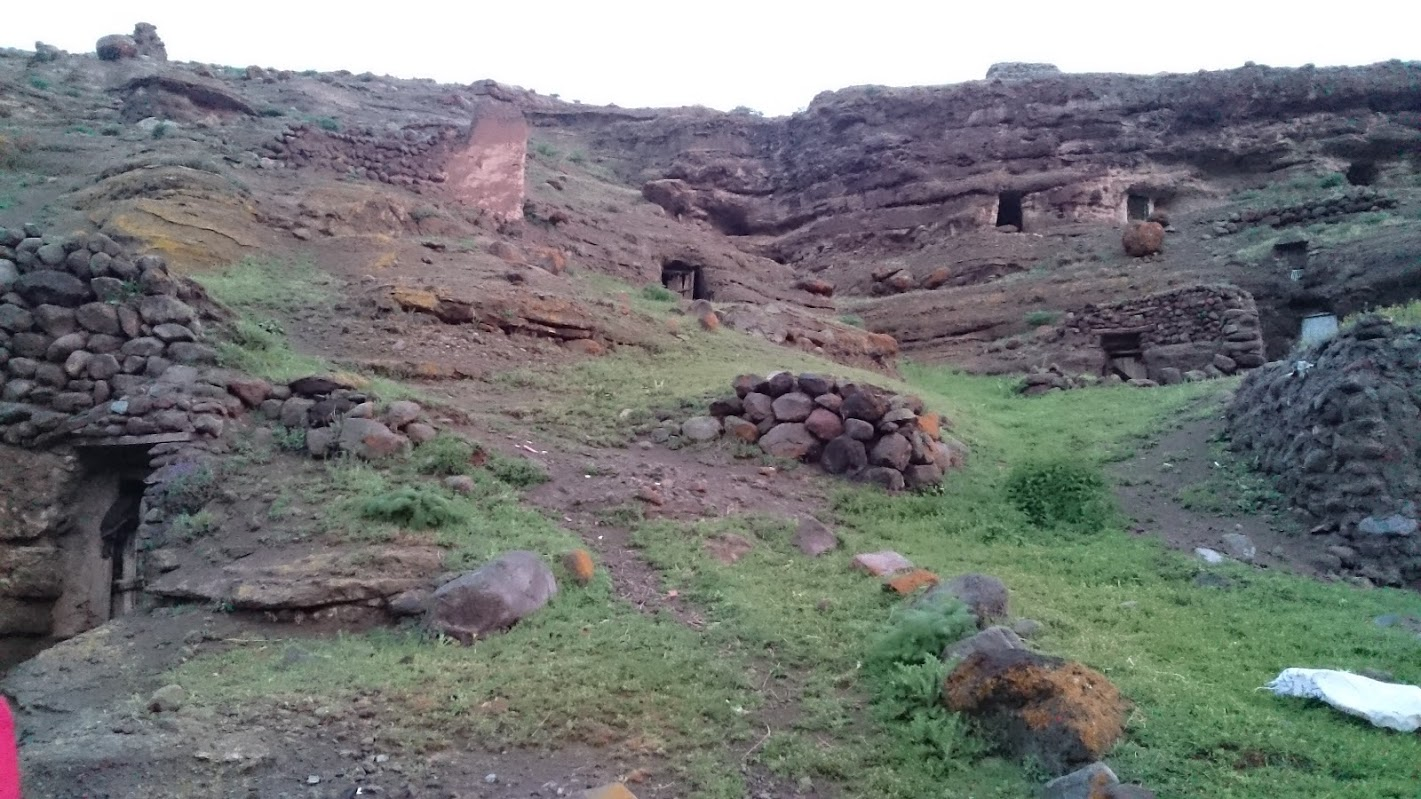

- Location within Iran
- Coordinates: 38°29′03″N 46°31′57″E
- Country: Iran
- Province: East Azerbaijan
- County: Varzaqan
- Bakhsh: Central
- Rural District: Günej Üzümdil

Population (649)
  - Total: 135
- Time zone: UTC+3:30 (IRST)
  - Summer (DST): UTC+4:30 (IRDT)

Meisamia (/mejˈsæmiˈjæ/; Mejsämijä; Azerbaijani Turkic: Meysəmiyə/مېيٛسەمييٛە; Farsi: میثمیه) is a village in Üzümdil, in the Central District of Varzaqan County, East Azerbaijan Province, Iran. At the 2006 census, its population was 135, in 35 families.

== Etymology ==
The village is called Meisamia because it belongs to Meisam Khan. The previous name was Hamamly and was subsequently renamed to Meisamia.

The name Meisamia is divided into two components: Meisam (Name of the Khan) and -ia suffix that created the content of "Place, Land and Country".

== Economy ==
Products of this village are cereals. People living on agriculture and cattle and they do crafts village is Kilim.

== Geography ==
Is mountainous and temperate zone.

== Demographics ==
According to official census of 2006, the population of Meisamia is about 135. The majority of the village's population are Turks.

=== Language ===
Today, the predominant language spoken in Meisamia is Azerbaijani Turkic, which belongs to the Turkic languages family. Azerbaijani is a member of Oghuz branch of Turkic language, and it is closely related to Turkish and Turkmeni. It is known to speakers as Turki.

=== Religion ===
The majority of people are followers of Islam.

== Culture and art ==
=== Music ===
The popular music between Meisamia people is Ashyq that play the Qopuz, a form of lute. Their songs are partly improvised around a common base.

=== Cuisine ===
Some traditional Meisamia dishes are:

Āsh is a kind of soup which are prepared with bouillon, various vegetables, carrot, noodle and spices.

Dolma is a traditional delicious Azerbaijani food. It is prepared with eggplant, capsicum, tomato or zucchini filled with a mixture of meat, split pea, onion and various spices.

== Main sights & Landscape ==
there are many sights in Meisamia that which include:

- Meisamia castle hill
- Pishik dashy rock, is rock that is like Cat
- Dägirmän Boǧazy
- Kasabulaq, spring in the form of two nested bowls

== Meisamia Castle Hill ==
Meisamia Castle Hill The Meisamia Castle Hill was discovered to the geographical location of the central part of Meisamia, No. 25218, dating back to the First millennium BC in the Meisamia.

== Property stolen ==
In an area called the Meisamia village Aq Dashlyq cemetery that Tombstone block with a variety of shapes and lines, and written and of course before it has owned over 100 pieces of the local language is called the Qoch Dashy in 1985 after years of neglect of relevant people and organizations and so-called historical books knack smugglers loot and plunder were completely destroyed and burnt to the ground and has been.

== Tourism ==
There are some of the most important tourist destinations in Meisamia;

Monuments: Goegaerchin kiran; Pishik dashy; Daegirmaen boghazy; Kasabulaq; Baghyr bulaghy; Kiran bulaghy; Nov bulaq; Sheikh Ojaghy; Meisamia Caves	Museums: Great Museum of Meisamia; Khan Museum	Hotels: Meisamia Hotel; Gögärčin Hotel	Universities: University of Meisamia; Technical University of Meisamia; Zira'at University of Applied Science and Technology
