= Aşağıçakmak, Köprüköy =

Village in Turkey

Aşağıçakmak
- Neighbourhood
- Location in Turkey
- Coordinates: 40.0280°N 41.9309°E
- Country: Turkey
- Province: Erzurum
- District: Köprüköy
- Population (2022): 34
- Time zone: UTC+3 (TRT)

Aşağıçakmak is a neighbourhood in the municipality and district of Köprüköy, Erzurum Province in Turkey. Its population is 34 (2022).
