= Elmalı, Çamlıdere =

Elmalı
- Neighbourhood
- Location in Turkey Elmalı (Turkey Central Anatolia)
- Coordinates: 40.4075°N 32.4804°E
- Country: Turkey
- Province: Ankara
- District: Çamlıdere
- Population (2022): 239
- Time zone: UTC+3 (TRT)

Elmalı is a neighbourhood in the municipality and district of Çamlıdere, Ankara Province, Turkey. Its population is 239 (2022).
