= Kuyubaşı, Çamlıdere =

Kuyubaşı
- Neighbourhood
- Country: Turkey
- Province: Ankara
- District: Çamlıdere
- Population (2022): 42
- Time zone: UTC+3 (TRT)

Kuyubaşı is a neighbourhood in the municipality and district of Çamlıdere, Ankara Province, Turkey. As of 2022, its population was 42.
