= Boğazpınar, Tarsus =

Boğazpınar
- Neighbourhood
- Location in Turkey
- Coordinates: 37°11′N 34°43′E
- Country: Turkey
- Province: Mersin
- District: Tarsus
- Elevation: 740 m (2,430 ft)
- Population (2022): 298
- Time zone: UTC+3 (TRT)
- Area code: 0324

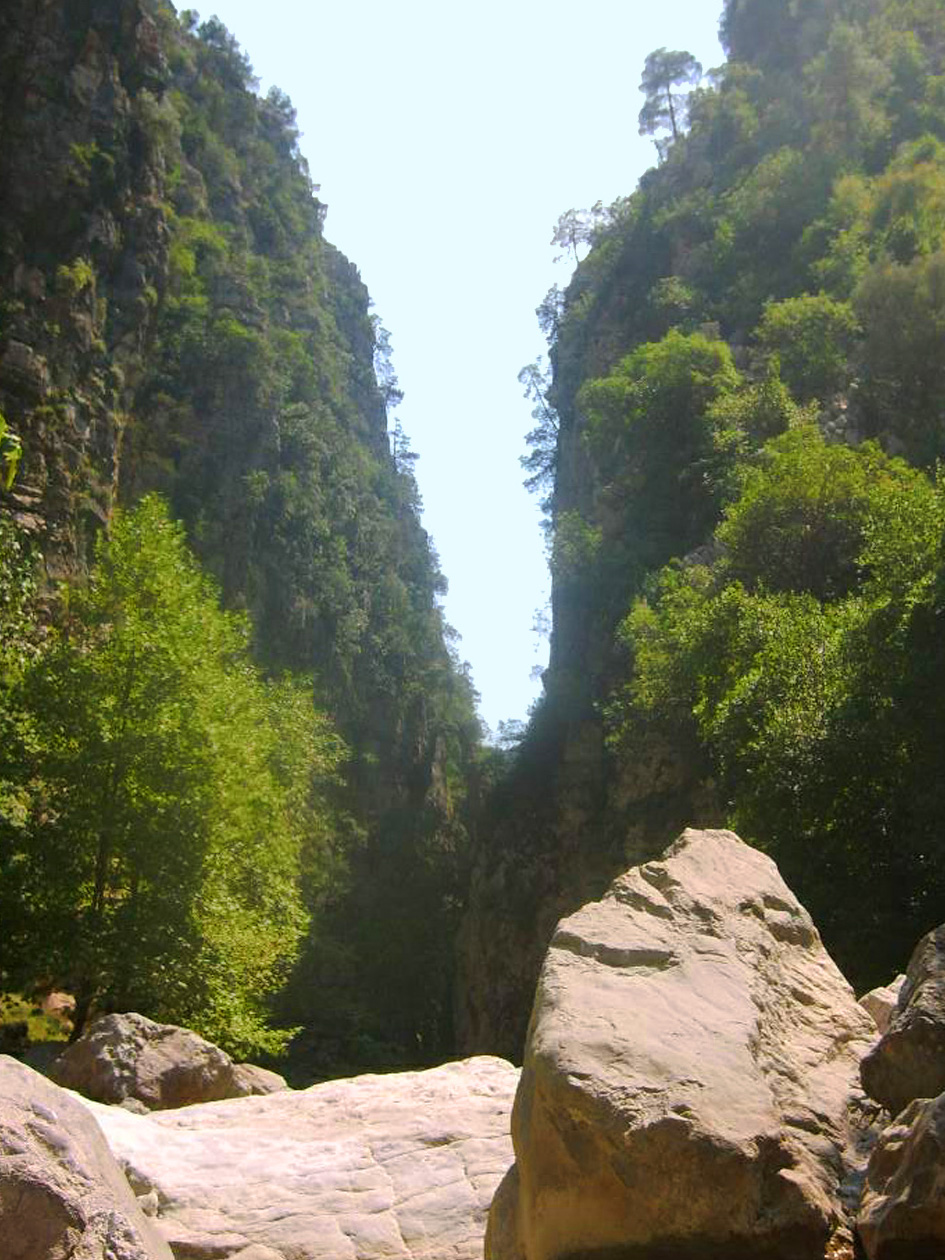
Boğazpınar Canyon, Mersin Province, Turkey

Boğazpınar (formerly Boğazkinir) is a neighbourhood in the municipality and district of Tarsus, Mersin Province, Turkey. Its population is 298 (2022). Its distance to Tarsus is 60 kilometres (37 mi) and its distance to Mersin is 76 kilometres (47 mi). The village is situated in mountainous terrain at the eastern side of a canyon. The 4 kilometres (2.5 mi) canyon is about 200 metres (660 ft) deep with respect to the village.
