= Doğancı, Çamlıdere =

Doğancı
- Neighbourhood
- Location in Turkey Doğancı (Turkey Central Anatolia)
- Coordinates: 40.4229°N 32.4287°E
- Country: Turkey
- Province: Ankara
- District: Çamlıdere
- Population (2022): 53
- Time zone: UTC+3 (TRT)

Doğancı is a neighbourhood in the municipality and district of Çamlıdere, Ankara Province, Turkey. Its population is 53 (2022).
