= Alaca, Köprüköy =

Village in Turkey

Alaca
- Neighbourhood
- Location in Turkey
- Coordinates: 39.8390°N 41.8945°E
- Country: Turkey
- Province: Erzurum
- District: Köprüköy
- Population (2022): 1,095
- Time zone: UTC+3 (TRT)

Alaca is a neighbourhood in the municipality and district of Köprüköy, Erzurum Province in Turkey. Its population was 1,095 as of 2022.
