= Aşağıelmalı, Kulp =

Village in Turkey

Aşağıelmalı
- Neighbourhood
- Location in Turkey
- Coordinates: 38.5297°N 40.8716°E
- Country: Turkey
- Province: Diyarbakır
- District: Kulp
- Population (2022): 220
- Time zone: UTC+3 (TRT)

Aşağıelmalı, also known as Elmalı, (Armenian: Թիասիս, romanized: Tiasis, Kurdish: Deyas) is a neighbourhood in the municipality and district of Kulp, Diyarbakır Province in Turkey. It is populated by Kurds and had a population of 220 in 2022.
