= Yılanlı, Çamlıdere =

Yılanlı
- Neighbourhood
- Location in Turkey Yılanlı (Turkey Central Anatolia)
- Coordinates: 40.4153°N 32.2592°E
- Country: Turkey
- Province: Ankara
- District: Çamlıdere
- Population (2022): 136
- Time zone: UTC+3 (TRT)

Yılanlı is a neighbourhood in the municipality and district of Çamlıdere, Ankara Province, Turkey. As of 2022, its population was 136.
