= Müsellim, Çamlıdere =

Müsellim
- Neighbourhood
- Location in Turkey Müsellim (Turkey Central Anatolia)
- Coordinates: 40.5289°N 32.3738°E
- Country: Turkey
- Province: Ankara
- District: Çamlıdere
- Population (2022): 74
- Time zone: UTC+3 (TRT)

Müsellim is a neighbourhood in the municipality and district of Çamlıdere, Ankara Province, Turkey. As of 2022, its population was 74.
