= Dad (disambiguation) =

Dad is a synonym for father in English.

Dad, DAD, or Dads may also refer to:

== Places ==
- Dad, Hungary, a village
- Dad, Wyoming, a ghost town

== People ==
- Dad (nickname), a list of people
- Sameer Dad (born 1978), Indian field hockey player
- Sher Mian Dad (born 1968), a Pakistani singer
- Dad Mohammad Khan (died 2009), Member of Parliament in the National Assembly of Afghanistan
- Nathan Barnatt (born 1981), American YouTuber known for portraying "Dad" character

== Acronyms ==
=== Computer science ===
- Dictionary of Algorithms and Data Structures
- Disciplined agile delivery, a decision-making framework for large-scale Agile software development projects
- Drag-and-drop, or DaD
- Duplicate Address Detection, a component of the IPv6 electronic communications protocol

=== Medicine ===
- Delayed Afterdepolarization, a type of cardiac dysrhythmia
- Diffuse alveolar damage, a histological pattern of lung disease seen in Acute Respiratory Distress Syndrome and Acute Interstitial Pneumonia
- Disinhibited attachment disorder, a psychological disorder in the ICD-10

=== Chemistry ===
- Diallyl disulfide, a constituent of garlic oil
- 1,4-Diazabutadiene, a class of diimines

=== Other ===
- Dilbilim Araştırmaları, a linguistic journal published in Turkey
- Diode array detector, a type of detector in chromatographic methods
- Texas Department of Aging and Disability Services (DADS)
- Deutscher Aufbaudienst

== Film and television ==
- Dad (1989 film), a 1989 comedy-drama starring Jack Lemmon and Ted Danson
- Dad (2005 film), a British television film
- Dad (TV series), a former British television sitcom
- Dads (1986 TV series), an ABC series
- Dads (2013 TV series), a Fox Broadcasting Company series
- "Dad" (Angel), a 2001 television episode
- "Dads" (Not Going Out), a 2012 television episode
- "Dad" (Red Dwarf), an unmade television episode
- Dad, a shortened title of the American web series Dad Feels
- Abbreviation for Die Another Day

== Music ==
- D-A-D, a Danish rock band formerly known as "Disneyland After Dark"
- Dads (band), an American indie rock/math rock/emo band
- Dad (A Band Called Bud album) (1989)
- Dad (Breakfast with Amy album) (1991)
- "Dad", by Meghan Trainor from the album Meghan Trainor

== Brands ==
- Dad, a Beanie Baby teddy bear made by Ty, Inc. in 2004
- Dad's Root Beer, an American root beer

== Codes ==
- DAD, IATA airport code for Da Nang International Airport
- dad, ISO 639-3 code for the Marik language, spoken in Papua New Guinea

== Other uses ==
- Ḍād (ﺽ), a letter of the Arabic alphabet
- Dad (novel), a novel by William Wharton and the basis for the 1989 film of the same name

== See also ==
- American Dad!, American animated sitcom
- Father
- My Two Dads, American sitcom television series
