= Die Päkhy-Sprache =

Die Päkhy-Sprache (which means The Ubykh Language in German) is the title of a treatise in the Ubykh language, written by Gyula Mészáros and published in 1934 by the University of Chicago Press.

It was the first major descriptive work written in Ubykh. At the time of the treatise, the phonological complexities of the language were not fully understood. The transcription system used in the book was somewhat lacking, distinguishing only about 80% of Ubykh's 80-odd phonemes. Despite this shortcoming, Mészáros's account of the grammar was quite accurate. The quality and scope of the 402 page book drew much attention to this obscure language, paving the way for the further documentation of the Ubykh language by Georges Dumézil, Hans Vogt and Tevfik Esenç.
