= Ubykh language =

Dormant Northwest Caucasian language

Ubykh
- tuex̂ıbze
- Pronunciation: /tʷɜxɨbzɜ/
- Native to: Circassia
- Region: Ubykhia (Sochi)
- Ethnicity: Ubykh
- Extinct: 7 October 1992, with the death of Tevfik Esenç
- Language family: Northwest Caucasian: Ubykh
- Writing system: Unwritten, but provisional orthographies have been developed

Language codes
- ISO 639-3: uby
- Glottolog: ubyk1235
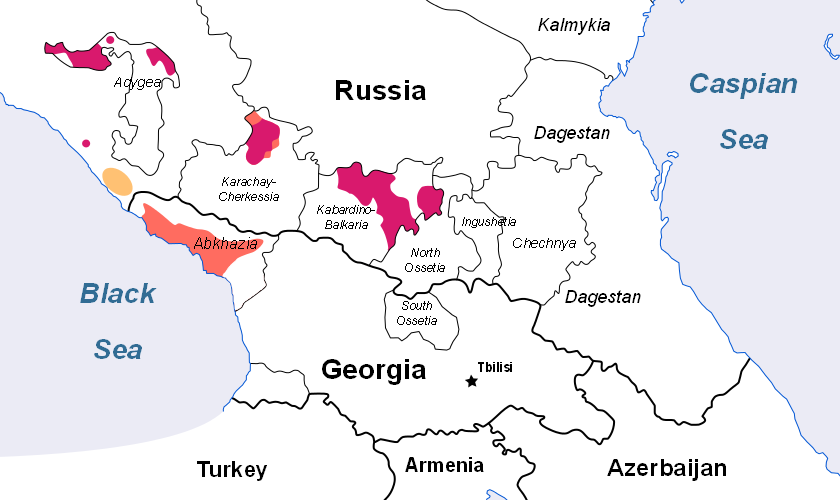
- Ubykh (extinct)

- Ubykh is classified as Extinct according to the UNESCO Atlas of the World's Languages in Danger

Ubykh (Note: Turkish: Vubıh) is an extinct Northwest Caucasian language once spoken by the Ubykh people, an ethnic group of Circassians who originally inhabited the eastern coast of the Black Sea before being killed or deported en masse by Russia to the Ottoman Empire during the Circassian genocide. The last speaker was Tevfik Esenç, who died in 1992. Ubykh is ergative and polysynthetic, with a high degree of agglutination, with polypersonal verbal agreement and a very large number of distinct consonants but only two phonemically distinct vowels. With around eighty consonants, it has one of the largest inventories of consonants in the world, and the largest number for any language without clicks.

== Name ==
The name Ubykh is derived from Убых (/wɨbɨx/), from Убыхыбзэ, its name in the Adyghe language. It is known in linguistic literature by many names: variants of Ubykh, such as Ubikh, Oubykh (French); and its Germanised variant Päkhy (from Ubykh /tʷɜχɨ/).

== Evolution ==
In the scheme of Northwest Caucasian evolution, despite its parallels with Adyghe and Abkhaz, Ubykh forms a separate third branch of the family. It has fossilised palatal class markers where all other Northwest Caucasian languages preserve traces of an original labial class: the Ubykh word for 'heart', /ɡʲɨ/, corresponds to the reflex /ɡʷə/ in Abkhaz, Abaza, Adyghe, and Kabardian. Ubykh also possesses groups of pharyngealised consonants. All other NWC languages possess true pharyngeal consonants, but Ubykh is the only language to use pharyngealisation as a feature of secondary articulation.

With regard to the other languages of the family, Ubykh is closer to Adyghe and Kabardian but shares many features with Abkhaz due to geographic influence; many later Ubykh speakers were bilingual in Ubykh and Adyghe.

=== Dialects ===
While not many dialects of Ubykh existed, one divergent dialect of Ubykh has been noted (in Dumézil 1965:266-269). Grammatically, it is similar to standard Ubykh (i.e. Tevfik Esenç's dialect), but has a very different sound system, which had collapsed into just 62 phonemes:

- /dʷ/ /tʷ/ /tʷʼ/ have collapsed into /b/ /p/ /pʼ/.
- /ɕʷ/ /ʑʷ/ are indistinguishable from /ʃʷ/ /ʒʷ/.
- /ɣ/ seems to have disappeared.
- Pharyngealisation is no longer distinctive, having been replaced in many cases by geminate consonants.
- Palatalisation of the uvular consonants is no longer phonemic.

== History ==
Ubykh was spoken in the eastern coast of the Black Sea around Sochi until 1864, when the Ubykhs were driven out of the region by the Russians. They eventually came to settle in Turkey, founding the villages of Hacı Osman, Kırkpınar, Masukiye and Hacı Yakup. Arabic and Circassian eventually became the preferred languages for everyday communication, and many words from these languages entered Ubykh in that period.

The Ubykh language died out on 7 October 1992, when its last fluent speaker, Tevfik Esenç, died. Before his death, thousands of pages of material and many audio recordings had been collected and collated by a number of linguists, including Georges Charachidzé, Georges Dumézil, Hans Vogt, George Hewitt and A. Sumru Özsoy, with the help of some of its last speakers, particularly Tevfik Esenç and Huseyin Kozan. Ubykh was never written by its speech community, but a few phrases were transcribed by Evliya Çelebi in his Seyahatname and a substantial portion of the oral literature, along with some cycles of the Nart saga, was transcribed. Tevfik Esenç also eventually learned to write Ubykh in the transcription that Dumézil devised.

Julius von Mészáros, a Hungarian linguist, visited Turkey in 1930 and took down some notes on Ubykh. His work Die Päkhy-Sprache was extensive and accurate to the extent allowed by his transcription system (which could not represent all the phonemes of Ubykh) and marked the foundation of Ubykh linguistics.

The Frenchman Georges Dumézil also visited Turkey in 1930 to record some Ubykh and would eventually become the most celebrated Ubykh linguist. He published a collection of Ubykh folktales in the late 1950s, and the language soon attracted the attention of linguists for its small number of phonemic vowels. Hans Vogt, a Norwegian, produced a monumental dictionary that, in spite of its many errors (later corrected by Dumézil), is still one of the masterpieces and essential tools of Ubykh linguistics.

Later in the 1960s and into the early 1970s, Dumézil published a series of papers on Ubykh etymology in particular and Northwest Caucasian etymology in general. Dumézil's book Le Verbe Oubykh (1975), a comprehensive account of the verbal and nominal morphology of the language, is another cornerstone of Ubykh linguistics.

Since the 1980s, Ubykh linguistics has slowed drastically with the most recent treatise being Fenwick's A Grammar of Ubykh (2011), who was also working on a dictionary.

The Abkhaz writer Bagrat Shinkuba's historical novel The Last of the Departed is about the Ubykh people.

People who have published literature on Ubykh include:

- Brian George Hewitt
- Georges Dumézil
- Hans Vogt
- John Colarusso
- Tevfik Esenç
- Viacheslav Chirikba

== Major features ==
Ubykh is distinguished by the following features, some of which are shared with other Northwest Caucasian languages:

- It is ergative, making no syntactic distinction between the subject of an intransitive sentence and the direct object of a transitive sentence. Split ergativity plays only a small part, if at all.
- It is highly agglutinating and polysynthetic, using mainly monosyllabic or bisyllabic roots, but with single morphological words sometimes reaching nine or more syllables in length: /ɜχʲɜzbɜtɕʼɜʁɜwdɨtʷɐjlɜfɜqʼɜjtʼmɜdɜχ/ ('if only you had not been able to make him take [it] all out from under me again for them'). Affixes rarely fuse in any way.
- It has a simple nominal system, contrasting just three noun cases, and not always marking grammatical number in the direct case.
- Its system of verbal agreement is quite complex. English verbs must agree only with the subject; Ubykh verbs must agree with the subject, the direct object and the indirect object, and benefactive objects must also be marked in the verb.
- It is phonologically complex as well, with 84 distinct consonants (four of which, however, appear only in loan words). It has three phonemic vowels [ɐ ɜ ɨ] which correspond to Dumézil's [aa a ə] respectively and this is evident in the minimal triplet of /ɐsʃɨn/ ('I milk X'), /ɐsʃɜn/ ('I reap X'), and /ɐsʃɐn/ ('I milk them; I reap them').

=== Notable characteristics ===
Ubykh had been cited in the Guinness Book of Records (1996 ed.) as the language with the most consonant phonemes, but since 2017 the !Xóõ language (a member of the Tuu languages) has been considered by the book to have broken that record, with 130 consonants. Ubykh has 20 uvular and 29 pure fricative phonemes, more than any other known language.

== Phonology ==
=== Consonants ===
Ubykh has 84 phonemic consonants, a record high amongst languages without click consonants, but only 3 phonemic vowels. Four of these consonants are found only in loanwords and onomatopoeiae. There are nine basic places of articulation for the consonants and extensive use of secondary articulation, such that Ubykh has 20 different uvular phonemes. Ubykh distinguishes three types of postalveolar consonants: apical, laminal, and laminal closed.

		Labial		Alveolar			Postalveolar					Palatal	Velar				Uvular					Glottal
		Labial		Alveolar			laminal closed		laminal		apical	Palatal	Velar				Uvular					Glottal
		plain	phar.	plain	lab.	sib.	plain	lab.	plain	lab.	apical	Palatal	pal.	plain	lab.	phar. & lab.	pal.	plain	lab.	phar.	phar. & lab.	Glottal
Plosive/ Affricate	voiceless	p	pˤ	t	tʷ	t͡s	t̠͡ʃ		t͡ɕ	t͡ɕʷ	ʈ͡ʂ		kʲ	k	kʷ		qʲ	q	qʷ	qˤ	qˤʷ	(ʔ)
Plosive/ Affricate	voiced	b	bˤ	d	dʷ	d͡z	d̠͡ʒ		d͡ʑ	d͡ʑʷ	ɖ͡ʐ		ɡʲ	ɡ	ɡʷ							
Plosive/ Affricate	ejective	pʼ	pˤʼ	tʼ	tʷʼ	t͡sʼ	t̠͡ʃʼ		t͡ɕʼ	t͡ɕʷʼ	ʈ͡ʂʼ		kʲʼ	kʼ	kʷʼ		qʲʼ	qʼ	qʷʼ	qˤʼ	qˤʷʼ	
Fricative	voiceless	f		ɬ	(sʷ)	s	ʃ	ʃʷ	ɕ	ɕʷ	ʂ			x	(xʷ)		χʲ	χ	χʷ	χˤ	χˤʷ	h
Fricative	voiced	v	vˤ		(zʷ)	z	ʒ	ʒʷ	ʑ	ʑʷ	ʐ			ɣ			ʁʲ	ʁ	ʁʷ	ʁˤ	ʁˤʷ	
Fricative	ejective			ɬʼ																		
Nasal		m	mˤ	n																		
Approximant				l								j			w	wˤ						
Trill				r																		

=== Vowels ===
Regarding the vowels, since there are only three phonemic vowels, there is a great deal of allophony.

	Central	Back
Close		(u)
Mid	ə	
Open	a	

== Orthography ==
Writing systems for the Ubykh language have been proposed, but there has never been a standard written form. However, Fenwick gives a guide for their "practical Ubykh orthography", intended to be typeable on a Turkish computer keyboard, which is shown below:

Practical Ubykh Orthography
IPA	Orthography	IPA	Orthography	IPA	Orthography	IPA	Orthography
[ɐ]	a	[z]	z	[tʃʼ]	ç'	[qʼ]	q'
[ɜ]	e	[s]	s	[ʒ]	j	[ʁ]	ğ
[ɨ]	ı	[r]	r	[ʃ]	ş	[χ]	x
[b]	b	[n]	n	[ʒʷ]	ju	[qʲ]	qi
[p]	p	[l]	l	[ʃʷ]	şu	[qʲʼ]	q'i
[pʼ]	p'	[ɬ]	lh	[ɖʐ]	cr	[ʁʲ]	ği
[v]	v	[ɬʼ]	l'h	[ʈʂ]	çr	[χʲ]	xi
[f]	f	[dʷ]	du	[ʈʂʼ]	ç'r	[qʷ]	qu
[w]	w	[tʷ]	tu	[j]	y	[qʷʼ]	q'u
[m]	m	[tʷʼ]	t'u	[ɡ]	g	[ʁʷ]	ğu
[bˤ]	bh	[dʑ]	ci	[k]	k	[χʷ]	xu
[pˤ]	ph	[tɕ]	çi	[kʼ]	k'	[qˤ]	qh
[pˤʼ]	p'h	[tɕʼ]	ç'i	[ɣ]	ĝ	[qˤʼ]	q'h
[vˤ]	vh	[ʑ]	ji	[x]	x̂	[ʁˤ]	ğh
[wˤ]	wh	[ɕ]	şi	[ɡʲ]	gi	[χˤ]	xh
[mˤ]	mh	[dʑʷ]	cü	[kʲ]	ki	[qʷˤ]	qö
[d]	d	[tɕʷ]	çü	[kʲʼ]	k'i	[qʷˤʼ]	q'ö
[t]	t	[tɕʷʼ]	ç'ü	[ɡʷ]	gu	[ʁʷˤ]	ğö
[tʼ]	t'	[ʑʷ]	jü	[kʷ]	ku	[χʷˤ]	xö
[dz]	dz	[ɕʷ]	şü	[kʷʼ]	k'u	[h]	h
[ts]	ts	[dʒ]	c	[xʷ]	x̂u	[ʐ]	jr
[tsʼ]	ts'	[tʃ]	ç	[q]	q	[ʂ]	şr

== Grammar ==
=== Morphosyntax ===
Ubykh is agglutinative and polysynthetic: /ʃɨkʲʼɐjɨfɜnɜmɨt/ ('we will not be able to go back'), /ɐwqʼɜqʼɜjtʼbɜ/ ('if you had said it'). It is often extremely concise in its word forms.

The boundaries between nouns and verbs is somewhat blurred. Any noun can be used as the root of a stative verb (/mɨzɨ/ 'child', /sɨmɨzɨjtʼ/ 'I was a child'), and many verb roots can become nouns simply by the use of noun affixes (/qʼɜ/ 'to say', /sɨqʼɜ/ 'what I say').

==== Nouns ====
Nouns in Ubykh have three main cases (the oblique-ergative case may be two homophonous cases with differing function, thus presenting four cases in total):

- direct or absolutive case, marked with the bare root; this indicates the subject of an intransitive sentence and the direct object of a transitive sentence (e.g. /tɨt/ 'a man')
- oblique-ergative case, marked in -/n/; this indicates either the subject of a transitive sentence, targets of preverbs, or indirect objects which do not take any other suffixes (/mɨzɨn/ '(to) a child')
- locative case, marked in -/ʁɜ/, which is the equivalent of English in, on or at.

There are X other cases that exist in Ubykh too:

- instrumental case (-/ɜwn(ɨ)/) was also treated as a case in Dumézil (1975).
- instrumental-comitative case (-/ɐlɜ/).
- Another pair of postpositions, -/lɐq/ ('to[wards]') and -/ʁɐfɜ/ ('for'), have been noted as synthetic datives (e.g. /ɜχʲɨlɐq ɜstʷɜdɜw/ 'I will send it to the prince'), but their status as cases is also best discounted.

Nouns do not distinguish grammatical gender. The definite article is /ɐ/ (e.g. /ɐtɨt/ 'the man'). There is no indefinite article directly equivalent to the English a or an, but /zɜ/-(root)-/ɡʷɜrɜ/ (literally 'one'-(root)-'certain') translates French un : e.g. /zɜnɜjnʃʷɡʷɜrɜ/ ('a certain young man').

Number is only marked on the noun in the ergative case, with -/nɜ/. The number marking of the absolutive argument is either by suppletive verb roots (e.g. /ɐkʷɨn blɜs/ 'he is in the car' vs. /ɐkʷɨn blɜʒʷɜ/ 'they are in the car') or by verb suffixes: /ɐkʲʼɜn/ ('he goes'), /ɐkʲʼɐn/ ('they go'). The second person plural prefix /ɕʷ/- triggers this plural suffix regardless of whether that prefix represents the ergative, the absolutive, or an oblique argument:

- Absolutive: /ɕʷɜstʷɐn/ ('I give you all to him')
- Oblique: /sɨɕʷɨntʷɐn/ ('he gives me to you all')
- Ergative: /ɐsɨɕʷtʷɐn/ ('you all give it/them to me')

Note that, in this last sentence, the plurality of it (/ɐ/-) is obscured; the meaning can be either 'You all give it to me' or 'You all give them to me'.

Adjectives, in most cases, are simply suffixed to the noun: /tʃɨbʒɨjɜ/ ('pepper') with /pɬɨ/ ('red') becomes /tʃɨbʒɨjɜpɬɨ/ ('red pepper'). Adjectives do not decline.

Postpositions are rare; most locative semantic functions, as well as some non-local ones, are provided with preverbal elements: /ɐsχʲɜwtxqʼɜ/ ('you wrote it for me'). However, there are a few postpositions: /sɨʁʷɜ sɨɡʲɐtɕʼ/ ('like me'), /ɐχʲɨlɐq/ ('near the prince').

==== Pronouns ====
Free pronouns in all North-West Caucasian languages lack an ergative-absolutive distinction.

Free personal pronouns
		First person	Second person	Third person
Singular	Standard	/s(ɨ)ʁʷɜ/	/(w(ɨ))ʁʷɜ/(joc. /χɜʁʷɜ/)	/ɐʁʷɜ/
Singular	AB	/(s)χɜ/	/(w(ɨ))ʁʷɜ/(joc. /χɜʁʷɜ/)	/ɐʁʷɜ/
Plural	Standard	/ʃɨʁʷɜɬɜ/	/ɕʷɨʁʷɜɬɜ/	/ɐʁʷɜɬɜ/
Plural	Tevfik Esenç	/ʃɜɬɜ/	/ɕʷɜɬɜ/	/ɐʁʷɜɬɜ/
Plural	Osman Güngür	/ʃɨʁʷɜ/	/ɕʷɨʁʷɜ/	/ɐʁʷɜɬɜ/

===== Possession =====
Possessive pronouns
	First person	Second person		Third person
	First person	Normal	Jocular	Third person
Singular	/sɨ/-	/wɨ/-	/χɜ/-	/ʁɜ/-
Plural	/ʃɨ/-	/ɕʷɨ/-	/χɜ/-	/ɐʁɜ/-

Possessed nouns have their plurality marked with the affix /-ɜw-/.

/ʃɜwtʃɨ/
/ʃ(ɨ)-ɜw-tʃɨ/
1.POSS-PL-horse
Our horses

==== Verbs ====
A past–present–future distinction of verb tense exists (the suffixes -/qʼɜ/ and -/ɜwt/ represent past and future) and an imperfective aspect suffix is also found (-/jtʼ/, which can combine with tense suffixes). Dynamic and stative verbs are contrasted, as in Arabic, and verbs have several nominal forms. Morphological causatives are not uncommon. The conjunctions /ɡʲɨ/ ('and') and /ɡʲɨlɜ/ ('but') are usually given with verb suffixes, but there is also a free particle corresponding to each:

- -/ɡʲɨ/ 'and' (free particle /ve/, borrowed from Arabic);
- -/ɡʲɨlɜ/ 'but' (free particle /ɜʁʷɜ/)

Pronominal benefactives are also part of the verbal complex, marked with the preverb /χʲɜ/-, but a benefactive cannot normally appear on a verb that has three agreement prefixes already.

Gender only appears as part of the second person paradigm, and then only at the speaker's discretion. The feminine second person index is /χɜ/-, which behaves like other pronominal prefixes: /wɨsχʲɜntʷɨn/ ('he gives [it] to you [normal; gender-neutral] for me'), but compare /χɜsχʲɜntʷɨn/ 'he gives [it] to you [feminine] for me').

===== Agreement =====
Oblique 1 markers are limited to marking the agreement of a noun before a relational preverb and Oblique 2 markers are used for not only marking agreement with local and directional preverbs but also the simple oblique, or dative, arguments.

Pronominal Agreement Markers
		Absolutive	Oblique (1 and 2)	Ergative
First person	sg.	/s(ɨ)/-	/s(ɨ)/- ~ /z/	/s(ɨ)/- ~ /z/
First person	pl.	/ʃ(ɨ)/-	/ʃ(ɨ)/- ~ /ʒ/-	/ʃ(ɨ)/- ~ /ʒ/-
Second person	sg.	/wɨ/-	/w(ɨ)/-	/w(ɨ)/-
Second person	pl.	/ɕʷ(ɨ)/-	/ɕʷ(ɨ)/- ~ /ʑʷ(ɨ)/-	/ɕʷ(ɨ)/- ~ /ʑʷ(ɨ)/-
Second person	sg. (joc., arc.)	/χɜ/-	/χɜ/-	/χɜ/-
Third person	sg.	/ɐ/-, /jɨ/-, /ɨ/-, /Ø/-	/Ø/-	n(ɨ)/- /Ø/-
Third person	pl.	/ɐ/-, /jɨ/-, /Ø/-	/ɐ/-	/ɐ/-, /nɐ/-

The second-person /χɜ/- is an archaic pronoun used to indicate that the person being referred to is a female, or heckling the speaker in some way.

===== Dynamic verb conjugation =====
Dynamic Ubykh verbs are split up in two groups: Group I which contain the simple tenses and Group II which contain derived counterpart tenses. Only the Karaclar dialect uses the progressive tense and the plural is unknown.

The singular-plural distinction is used when the subject, the ergative, is singular or plural.

Square brackets indicate elided vowels; parenthesis indicate optional parts of the stem; and the colon indicates the boundary of a morpheme.

Group I
	Singular	Plural
Simple Past	-/qʼɜ/	-/qʼɜ-n(ɜ)/
Mirative Past	-/jtʼ/	-/jɬ(ɜ)/
Present	-/n/	-/ɐ-n/
Future I	-/ɜw/	-/n[ɜ]-ɜw/
Future II	-/ɜwːt/	-/n[ɜ]-ɜwːt/
(Progressive)	-/ɜwɨːn/	?

Group II
	Singular	Plural
Pluperfect	-/qʼɜːjtʼ/	-/qʼɜːjɬ(ɜ)/ ~ -/qʼɜːnɜːjtʼ/
Imperfect	-/nɜːtjʼ/	-/ɐ-nɜːjɬ(ɜ)/
Conditional I	-/ɜwɨːjtʼ/	-/n[ɜ]-ɜwɨːjɬ(ɜ)/
Conditional II	-/ɜwːtʷːqʼɜ/	-/(n[ɜ]-)ɜwːtʷːqʼɜ(-n)/

====== Simple past ======
The verbs in the simple past tense are conjugated with -/qʼɜ/ in the singular and -/qʼɜ-n(ɜ)/ in the plural.

Examples:

- /qʼɜ/ - to say → /ɐ-qʼɜ-qʼɜ/ (s)he said
- /fɨ/ - to eat → /ɐ-fɨ-qʼɜ/ (s)he ate
- /tɕʼɜ/ - to know → /ɐ-tɕʼɜ-qʼɜ/ (s)he knew
- /kʲʼɜ/ - to go → /ɐ-kʲʼɜ-qʼɜ/ (s)he went

Plurality	Person	Ubykh	Meaning
Singular	First-person	/s(ɨ)-fɨ-qʼɜ/	I ate
Singular	Second-person	/wɨ-fɨ-qʼɜ/	you ate
Singular	Third-person	/ɐ-fɨ-qʼɜ/	(s)he ate
Plural	First-person	/ʃ(ɨ)-fɨ-qʼɜ-n(ɜ)/	we ate
Plural	Second-person	/ɕʷ(ɨ)-fɨ-qʼɜ-n(ɜ)/	you (all) ate
Plural	Third-person	/ɐ-fɨ-qʼɜ-n(ɜ)/	they ate

====== Mirative past ======
The verbs in the mirative past tense are conjugated with -/jtʼ/ in the singular and -/jɬ(ɜ)/ in the plural.

Examples:

- /qʼɜ/ - to say → /ɐ-qʼɜ-jtʼ/ (s)he said apparently
- /fɨ/ - to eat → /ɐ-fɨ-jtʼ/ (s)he ate apparently
- /tɕʼɜ/ - to know → /ɐ-tɕʼɜ-jtʼ/ (s)he knew apparently
- /kʲʼɜ/ - to go → /ɐ-kʲʼɜ-jtʼ/ (s)he went apparently

Plurality	Person	Ubykh	Meaning
Singular	First-person	/s(ɨ)-fɨ-jtʼ/	I ate apparently
Singular	Second-person	/wɨ-fɨ-jtʼ/	you ate apparently
Singular	Third-person	/ɐ-fɨ-jtʼ/	(s)he ate apparently
Plural	First-person	/ʃ(ɨ)-fɨ-jɬ(ɜ)/	we ate apparently
Plural	Second-person	/ɕʷ(ɨ)-fɨ-jɬ(ɜ)/	you (all) ate apparently
Plural	Third-person	/ɐ-fɨ-jɬ(ɜ)/	they ate apparently

====== Present ======
The verbs in the present tense are conjugated with -/n/ in the singular and -/ɐ-n/ in the plural.

Examples:

- /qʼɜ/ - to say → /ɐ-qʼɜ-n/ (s)he says
- /fɨ/ - to eat → /ɐ-fɨ-n/ (s)he eats
- /tɕʼɜ/ - to know → /ɐ-tɕʼɜ-n/ (s)he knows
- /kʲʼɜ/ - to go → /ɐ-kʲʼɜ-n/ (s)he goes

Plurality	Person	Ubykh	Meaning
Singular	First-person	/s(ɨ)-fɨ-n/	I eat
Singular	Second-person	/wɨ-fɨ-n/	you eat
Singular	Third-person	/ɐ-fɨ-n/	(s)he eats
Plural	First-person	/ʃ(ɨ)-f-ɐ-n/	we eat
Plural	Second-person	/ɕʷ(ɨ)-f-ɐ-n/	you (all) eat
Plural	Third-person	/ɐ-f-ɐ-n/	they eat

====== Future I ======
The verbs in the present tense are conjugated with -/ɜw/ in the singular and -/n[ɜ]-ɜw/ in the plural. It conveys a sense of certainty, immediacy, obligation, or intentionality.

Examples:

- /qʼɜ/ - to say → /ɐ-qʼ-ɜw/ (s)he certainly will say
- /fɨ/ - to eat → /ɐ-f-ɜw/ (s)he certainly will eat
- /tɕʼɜ/ - to know → /ɐ-tɕʼ-ɜw/ (s)he certainly will know
- /kʲʼɜ/ - to go → /ɐ-kʲʼ-ɜw/ (s)he certainly will go

Plurality	Person	Ubykh	Meaning
Singular	First-person	/s(ɨ)-fɨ-n[ɜ]-ɜw/	I certainly will eat
Singular	Second-person	/wɨ-fɨ-n[ɜ]-ɜw/	you certainly will eat
Singular	Third-person	/ɐ-fɨ-n[ɜ]-ɜw/	(s)he certainly will eat
Plural	First-person	/ʃ(ɨ)-fɨ-n[ɜ]-ɜw/	we certainly will eat
Plural	Second-person	/ɕʷ(ɨ)-fɨ-n[ɜ]-ɜw/	you (all) certainly will eat
Plural	Third-person	/ɐ-fɨ-n[ɜ]-ɜw/	they certainly will eat

====== Future II ======
The verbs in the present tense are conjugated with -/ɜwːt/ in the singular and -/n[ɜ]-ɜwːt/ in the plural. It conveys a generic sense of the future as well as an exhortative sense such as: /ʃɨ-kʲʼɜ-n[ɜ]-ɜw/ (let's go!).

Examples:

- /qʼɜ/ - to say → /ɐ-qʼ-ɜwːt/ (s)he will say
- /fɨ/ - to eat → /ɐ-f-ɜwːt/ (s)he will eat
- /tɕʼɜ/ - to know → /ɐ-tɕʼ-ɜwːt/ (s)he will know
- /kʲʼɜ/ - to go → /ɐ-kʲʼ-ɜwːt/ (s)he will go

Plurality	Person	Ubykh	Meaning
Singular	First-person	/s(ɨ)-f-ɜwːt/	I will eat
Singular	Second-person	/wɨ-f-ɜwːt/	you will eat
Singular	Third-person	/ɐ-f-ɜwːt/	(s)he will eat
Plural	First-person	/ʃ(ɨ)-fɨ-n[ɜ]-ɜwːt/	we will eat
Plural	Second-person	/ɕʷ(ɨ)-fɨ-n[ɜ]-ɜwːt/	you (all) will eat
Plural	Third-person	/ɐ-fɨ-n[ɜ]-ɜwːt/	they will eat

===== Static verb conjugation =====
In all dialects and speakers, only two static tenses exist: present and past.

	Singular	Plural
Present	-/Ø/	-/n(ɜ)/
Past	-/jtʼ/	-/jɬ(ɜ)/

===== Aspect =====
There are five basic aspects that exist besides the aspects that exist within the Ubykh tense system. They are: habitual, iterative, exhaustive, excessive, and potential.

A speaker may combine one of these aspects with another to convey more complex aspects in conjunction with the tenses.

habitual	-/ɡʲɜ/
iterative	-/ɐj(ɨ)/
exhaustive	-/lɜ/
excessive	-/tɕʷɜ/
potential	-/fɜ/

A few meanings covered in English by adverbs or auxiliary verbs are given in Ubykh by verb suffixes:

- /ɐsfɨfɜn/ ('I can eat it') - /ɐzdʑʷɜfɜn/ ('I can drink it')
- /ɐsfɨɡʲɜn/ ('I eat it all the time') - /ɐzdʑʷɜɡʲɜn/ ('I drink it all the time')
- /ɐsfɨlɜn/ ('I am eating it all up') - /ɐzdʑʷɜlɜn/ ('I am drinking it all up')
- /ɐsfɨtɕʷɜn/ ('I eat it too much') - /ɐzdʑʷɜtɕʷɜn/ ('I drink it too much')
- /ɐsfɐjɨn/ ('I eat it again') - /ɐzdʑʷɐjɨn/ ('I drink it again')

example of Ubykh verbal aspects
	First person		Second person		Third person	
	singular	plural	singular	plural	singular	plural
simple	/s(ɨ)-fɨ-n/	/ʃ(ɨ)-f-ɐ-n/	/wɨ-fɨ-n/	/ɕʷ(ɨ)-f-ɐ-n/	/ɐ-fɨ-n/	/ɐ-f-ɐ-n/
habitual	/s(ɨ)-fɨ-ɡʲɜ-n/	/ʃ(ɨ)-f-ɡʲ[ɜ]-ɐ-n/	/wɨ-fɨ-ɡʲɜ-n/	/ɕʷ(ɨ)-fɨ-ɡʲ[ɜ]-ɐ-n/	/ɐ-fɨ-ɡʲɜ-n/	/ɐ-fɨ-ɡʲ[ɜ]-ɐ-n/
iterative	/s(ɨ)-f-ɐj(ɨ)-n/	/ʃ(ɨ)-f-ɐj(ɨ)-ɐ-n/	/wɨ-f-ɐj(ɨ)-n/	/ɕʷ(ɨ)-f-ɐj(ɨ)-ɐ-n/	/ɐ-f-ɐj(ɨ)-n/	/ɐ-f-ɐj(ɨ)-ɐ-n/
exhaustive	/s(ɨ)-fɨ-lɜ-n/	/ʃ(ɨ)-fɨ-l[ɜ]-ɐ-n/	/wɨ-fɨ-lɜ-n/	/ɕʷ(ɨ)-fɨ-l[ɜ]-ɐ-n/	/ɐ-fɨ-lɜ-n/	/ɐ-fɨ-l[ɜ]-ɐ-n/
excessive	/s(ɨ)-fɨ-tɕʷɜ-n/	/ʃ(ɨ)-fɨ-tɕʷ[ɜ]-ɐ-n/	/wɨ-fɨ-tɕʷɜ-n/	/ɕʷ(ɨ)-fɨ-tɕʷ[ɜ]-ɐ-n/	/ɐ-fɨ-tɕʷɜ-n/	/ɐ-fɨ-tɕʷ[ɜ]-ɐ-n/
potential	/s(ɨ)-fɨ-fɜ-n/	/ʃ(ɨ)-fɨ-f[ɜ]-ɐ-n/	/wɨ-fɨ-fɜ-n/	/ɕʷ(ɨ)-fɨ-f[ɜ]-ɐ-n/	/ɐ-fɨ-fɜ-n/	/ɐ-fɨ-f[ɜ]-ɐ-n/

==== Questions ====
Questions may be marked grammatically, using verb suffixes or prefixes:

- Yes–no questions with -/ɕ/: /wɜnɜ ɐwbjɜqʼɜɕ/? ('did you see that?')
- Complex questions with -/j/: /sɐkʲʼɜ wɨpʼtsʼɜj/? ('what is your name?')

Other types of questions, involving the pronouns 'where' and 'what', may also be marked only in the verbal complex: /mɐwkʲʼɜnɨj/ ('where are you going?'), /sɐwqʼɜqʼɜjtʼɨj/ ('what had you said?').

==== Preverbs and determinants ====
Many local, prepositional, and other functions are provided by preverbal elements providing a large series of applicatives, and here Ubykh shows remarkable complexity. Two main types of preverbal elements exist: determinants and preverbs. The number of preverbs is limited, and mainly show location and direction. The number of determinants is also limited, but the class is more open; some determinant prefixes include /tʃɜ/- ('with regard to a horse') and /ɬɜ/- ('with regard to the foot or base of an object').

For simple locations, there are a number of possibilities that can be encoded with preverbs, including (but not limited to):

- above and touching
- above and not touching
- below and touching
- below and not touching
- at the side of
- through a space
- through solid matter
- on a flat horizontal surface
- on a non-horizontal or vertical surface
- in a homogeneous mass
- towards
- in an upward direction
- in a downward direction
- into a tubular space
- into an enclosed space

There is also a separate directional preverb meaning 'towards the speaker': /j/-, which occupies a separate slot in the verbal complex. However, preverbs can have meanings that would take up entire phrases in English. The preverb /jtɕʷʼɐ/- signifies 'on the earth' or 'in the earth', for instance: /ʁɜdjɜ ɐjtɕʷʼɐnɐɬqʼɜ/ ('they buried his body'; literally, "they put his body in the earth"). Even more narrowly, the preverb /fɐ/- signifies that an action is done out of, into or with regard to a fire: /ɐmdʒɜn zɜtʃɨtʃɜqʲɜ fɐstχʷɨn/ ('I take a brand out of the fire').

== Lexicon ==
=== Native vocabulary ===
Ubykh syllables have a strong tendency to be CV, although VC and CVC also exist. Consonant clusters are not as large as in Abzhywa Abkhaz or in Georgian, rarely being larger than two terms. Three-term clusters exist in two words - /ndʁɜ/ ('sun') and /pstɜ/ ('to swell up'), but the latter is a loan from Adyghe, and the former more often pronounced /nədʁa/ when it appears alone. Compounding plays a large part in Ubykh and, indeed, in all Northwest Caucasian semantics. For instance, the verb to love is expressed as /ʈʂʼɜn bɨjɜ/ (lit. 'to see well'), as in /ʈʂʼɜn zbɨˈjɜn/ 'I love him'.

Reduplication occurs in some roots, often those with onomatopoeic values (/χˤɜχˤɜ/, 'to curry[comb]' from /χˤɜ/ 'to scrape'; /kʼɨrkʼɨr/, 'to cluck like a chicken' [a loan from Adyghe]); and /wɜrqwɜrq/, 'to croak like a frog').

Roots and affixes can be as small as one phoneme. The word /wɜntʷɐn/, 'they give you to him', for instance, contains six phonemes, each a separate morpheme:

- /w/ - 2nd singular absolutive
- /ɜ/ - 3rd singular dative
- /n/ - 3rd ergative
- /tʷ/ - to give ^{a}
- /ɐ/ - ergative plural
- /n/ - present tense

However, some words may be as long as seven syllables (although these are usually compounds): /ʂɨqʷʼɜwɨɕɜɬɐdɨtʃɜ/ ('staircase').

=== Slang and idioms ===
As with all other languages, Ubykh is replete with idioms. The word /ntʷɜ/ ('door'), for instance, is an idiom meaning either "magistrate", "court", or "government." However, idiomatic constructions are even more common in Ubykh than in most other languages; the representation of abstract ideas with series of concrete elements is a characteristic of the Northwest Caucasian family. As mentioned above, the phrase meaning "You loved him" translates literally as 'You saw him well'; similarly, "she pleased you" is literally 'she cut your heart'. The term /wɨrɨs/ ('Russian') has come to be a slang term meaning "infidel", "non-Muslim" or "enemy" (see History below).

=== Foreign loans ===
The majority of loanwords in Ubykh are derived from either Adyghe or Arabic, with smaller numbers from Persian, Abkhaz, and the South Caucasian languages. Towards the end of Ubykh's life, a large influx of Adyghe words was noted; Vogt (1963) notes a few hundred examples. The phonemes /ɡ/ /k/ /kʼ/ were borrowed from Arabic and Adyghe. /ɬʼ/ also appears to come from Adyghe, although it seems to have arrived earlier on. It is possible, too, that /ɣ/ is a loan from Adyghe, since most of the few words with this phoneme are obvious Adyghe loans: /pɐɣɜ/ ('proud'), /ɣɜ/ ('testis').

Many loanwords have Ubykh equivalents, but were dwindling in usage under the influence of Arabic, Circassian, and Russian equivalents:

- /bɨrwɨ/ ('to make a hole in, to perforate' from Iranic languages) = /pɕɐtχʷ/
- /tʃɐj/ ('tea' from Chinese) = /bzɨpɕɨ/
- /wɨrɨs/ ('enemy' from Persian) = /bˤɜqˤʼɜ/

Some words, usually much older ones, are borrowed from less influential stock: Colarusso (1994) sees /χˤʷɜ/ ('pig') as a borrowing from Proto-Semitic *huka, and /ɜɡʲɜrɨ/ ('slave') from an Iranian root; however, Chirikba (1986) regards the latter as being of Abkhaz origin ( ← Abkhaz agər-wa 'lower cast of peasants; slave', literally 'Megrelian').

== Samples ==
All examples from Dumézil 1968 and retranscribed by Fenwick.

Fáxie zebıyale zewaqʼalé azecíne
fɐ́χʲɜ zɜ-bɨj-ɐlɜ zɜ-wɜqʼ-ɐlɜ́ ɐ-zɜ-dʒɨ́-nɜ-n
long.ago one-sheep-COM one-goat-COM 3pABS-RECIP.OBL-accompany-PL-CONV

yaxhewtıní aduıgiıqʼén.
j[ɜ]-ɐ-χˤ-ɜw:tɨ-nɨ́ ɐ-dʷɨ:gʲɨ-kʲɜ-qʼɜ́-n.
NULL.ABS-3pERG-graze-FUT.II-CONV 3pABS-PVB-enter(PL)-PAST-PL

daxiebzínetʼın ábıj ácʼrefén
d[ɜ]-ɐ-Ø-χʲɜ-bzɨ́-nɜ-tʼɨn ɐ́-bɨj ɐ-ʈʂʼɜfɜ́-n
SUB-3pABS-3sOBL-BEN-meet-IMPF-NFIN the-sheep -the-front-OBL

giıtıní aqárğue şreğecʼiedeqʼé
Ø-Ø-gʲɨ-tɨ-nɨ́ ɐ-qɐ́rʁʷɜ[-n] Ø-Ø-ʂɜ:ʁɜ-tɕʼɜdɜ-qʼɜ́
3pABS-3sOBL-PVB-be.standing(SG)-CONV the-gully[-OBL] 3sABS-3sOBL-PVB-jump-PAST

deşreğe-çʼiedetʼín ğekʼuecé qʼéşieqʼe ğélheqʼen
dɜ-Ø-Ø-ʂɜ:ʁɜ-tɕʼɜdɜ-tʼɨ́n ʁɜ-kʷʼɜtʃɜ́ Ø-qʼɜ́ɕɜ-qʼɜ ʁɜ́-ɬɜqʼɜ-n
SUB-3sABS-3sOBL-PVB-jump-CONV 3sPOSS-tail 3sABS-raise-PAST 3sPOSS-footprint-OBL

giıtuqʼejtʼ wuqʼí aşueçegií
Ø-Ø-gʲɨ́-tʷ-qʼɜ:jtʼ wɜqʼɨ́ ɐ-ʃʷɜtʃɜ-gʲɨ́
3sABS-3sOBL-PVB-be.standing(SG)-PLUP[.NFIN] goat 3sABS-laugh-CONV

mğiawqʼé «wıtxiéşeçen
Ø-mʁʲɐ-w-qʼɜ́ «wɨ-t-χʲɜ́-ʃʷɜtʃɜ-n
3sABS-PVB-enter(SG)-PAST «2sABS-REL-BEN-laugh-PRES

sákiıy?» qʼɜn aweqʼín
Ø-sɐ́kʲɨ-j?» Ø-qʼɜ-n ɐ-wɜqʼɨ́-n
3sABS-what[.STAT.PRES.NFIN]-INTERR 3sABS-say-CONV the-goat-OBL

déğadzğetʼín «wípşe zbyeqʼé
dɜ́-Ø-ʁ[ɜ]-ɐ-dzʁɜ-tʼɨn «wɨ́-pʃɜ Ø-z-bjɜ-qʼɜ́
SUB-3sABS-3sPOSS-PVB-ask-CONV «3sPOSS-bottom 3sABS-1sERG-see-PAST

wenéci sıtxieşeçén» qʼɜqʼé
Ø-wɜnɜ́-dʑ sɨ-t-χʲɜ-ʂɜ-ʃʷɜtʃɜ́-n» Ø-Ø-qʼɜ-qʼɜ́
3sABS-that-COP[.STAT.PRES] 1sABS-REL-PVB-laugh-PRES[.NFIN]» 3sABS-3sERG-say-PAST

ábıyıytʼíngiı díbrazen «ğue
Ø-ɐ́-bɨjɨ-jtʼɨ-n-gʲɨ Ø-Ø-dɨ́-brɐzɜ-n «ʁʷɜ
3sABS-the-sheep-STAT.PAST[.NFIN]-ERG-EMPH 3sABS-3sERG-CAUS-turn-CONV «you(SG)

mışüe-sresrıní wípşe ɐduın giıt
mɨɕʷɜ-ʂɜʂɨnɨ́ wɨ́-pʃɜ ɐ-dʷɨ-n Ø-Ø-gʲɨ-t
day-every 2sPOSS-bottom the-field-OBL 3sABS-3sOBL-PVB-be.standing(SG)[.STAT.PRES]

wıgié wmcʼiáyın, ğue zekié
wɨ-gʲɜ́ Ø-w-m-tɕʼ[ɜ]-ɐ́jɨ-n, ʁʷɜ zɜ:kʲɜ́
2sPOSS-self 3sABS-3sERG-NEG-know-ITER-CONV you(SG) once

sípşe déwbyeqʼeğafé wışueçén
sɨ́-pʃɜ dɜ́-Ø-w-bjɜ-qʼɜ-ʁ[ɜ]:ɐfɜ́ wɨ-ʃʷɜtʃɜ́-n»
1sPOSS-bottom SUB-3sABS-3sERG-see-PAST[.NFIN]-becayuse 2sABS-laugh-PRES»

ınqʼeqʼé.
ɨ-Ø-n-qʼɜ-qʼɜ́.
3sABS-3sOBL-3sERG-say-PAST

==== Free English translation ====
Once, a sheep and a goat went into the field to go grazing. Where they went to graze, they came upon a gully, and the sheep, who was in front, jumped over it. When the sheep jumped, its tail flew up. The goat, who had been following behind it, began to laugh.

"What are you laughing for?" the sheep asked the goat. "I saw your arse, that's what I'm laughing about," said the goat. The sheep turned to the goat and said, "your arse is out in the open every day without you knowing it. And you laugh because you saw mine once."

== Notable speakers ==
- Çule İbrahim Hakkı Bey (1876–1932), Circassian nationalist who founded the Association for the Strengthening of Near Eastern Circassian Rights in 1921, with the aim of creating a joint Greek–Circassian protectorate in the South Marmara region.

== See also ==
- North Caucasian languages

== Notes ==
^a Fenwick lists a plural form for /tʷ/ ('to give') but it is never used in the grammar even when a plural form is expected.

== Bibliography ==
- Chirikba, V. (1986). Abxazskie leksicheskie zaimstvovanija v ubyxskom jazyke (Abkhaz Lexical Loans in Ubykh). Problemy leksiki i grammatiki jazykov narodov Karachaevo-Cherkesii: Sbornik nauchnyx trudov (Lexical and Grammatical Problems of the Karachay-Cherkessian National Languages: A Scientific Compilation). Cherkessk, 112–124.
- Chirikba, V. (1996). Common West Caucasian. The Reconstruction of its Phonological System and Parts of its Lexicon and Morphology. Leiden: CNWS Publications.
- Colarusso, J. (1994). Proto-Northwest Caucasian (Or How To Crack a Very Hard Nut). Journal of Indo-European Studies 22, 1–17.
- Fenwick, R. (2011). A Grammar of Ubykh. Munich: Lincom Europa.
- Dumézil, G. (1957). Contes et Légendes des Oubykhs (Tales and Legends of the Ubykhs). Paris: L'Institut d'ethnologie.
- Dumézil, G. (1959). Trois récits oubykhs (Three Ubykh narratives). Baden: Anthropos, vol. 54.
- Dumézil, G. (1961). Etudes oubykhs (Ubykh Studies). Paris: Librairie A. Maisonneuve.
- Dumézil, G. (1965). Documents anatoliens sur les langues et les traditions du Caucase (Anatolian Documents on the Languages and Traditions of the Caucasus), III: Nouvelles études oubykhs (New Ubykh Studies). Paris: Librairie A. Maisonneuve.
- Dumézil, G. (1968). Eating Fish Makes You Clever. Annotated recording available via.
- Dumézil, G. (1975). Le verbe oubykh: études descriptives et comparatives (The Ubykh Verb: Descriptive and Comparative Studies). Paris: Imprimerie Nationale.
- Hewitt, B. G. (2005). North-West Caucasian. Lingua. 115, 91–145.
- Mészáros, J. von. (1930). Die Päkhy-Sprache (The Ubykh Language). Chicago: University of Chicago Press.
- Vogt, H. (1963). Dictionnaire de la langue oubykh (Dictionary of the Ubykh Language). Oslo: Universitetsforlaget.
