= Ubykh people =

Caucasian ethnic group

Ubykh
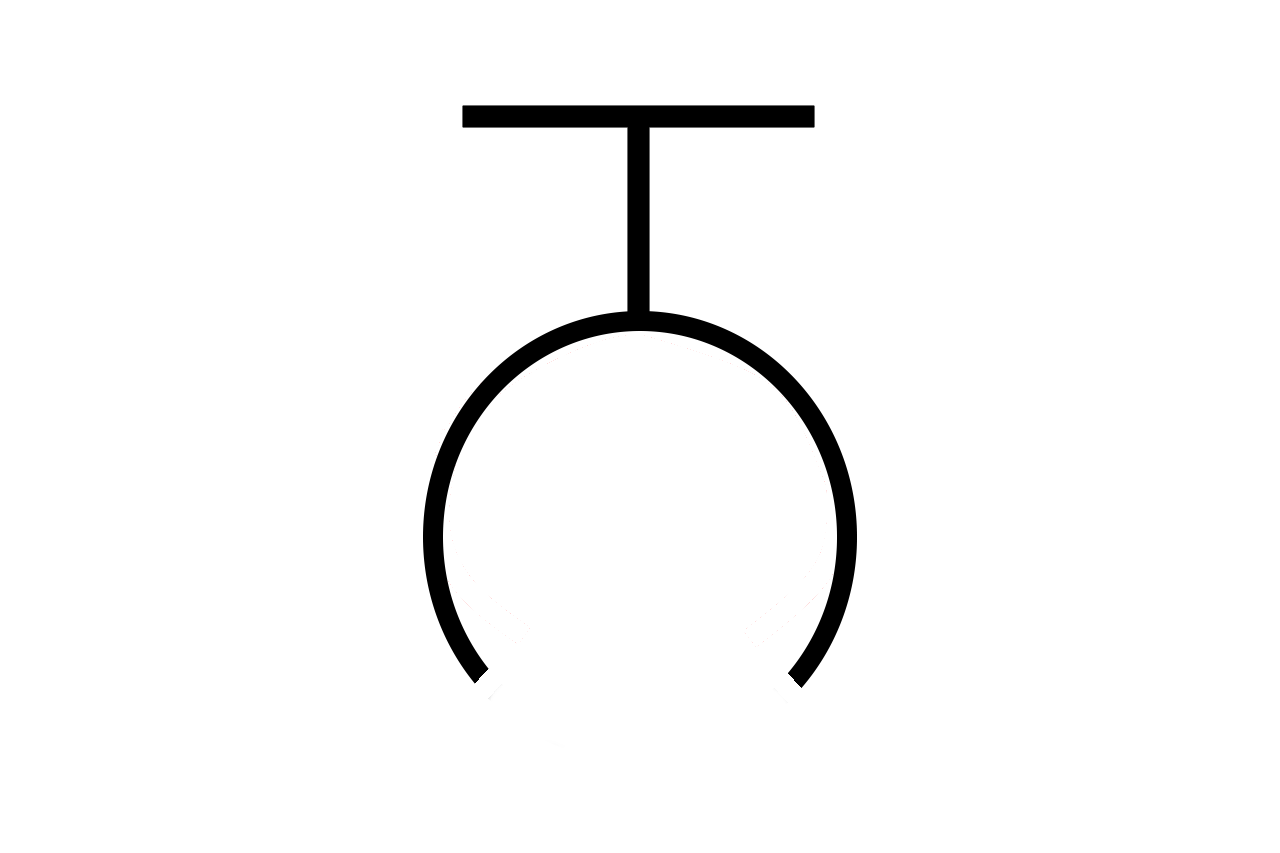
- Tamga of the House of Berzeg, one of the most influential clans of Ubykhia

Regions with significant populations
- Turkey

Languages
- Ubykh (historically), Turkish, Circassian languages

Related ethnic groups
- Abazins, Abkhazians, Circassians

The Ubykh (Note: Ubykh: Твэхы, romanized: Tvəxy, IPA: [tʷɜxɨ]; Adyghe: Убых, romanized: Ubyx, IPA: [wɘbɘ́x]; Russian: Убыхи, romanized: Ubýkhi, IPA: [ʊˈbɨxʲɪ]; Turkish: (V)ubıhlar, IPA: [(v)ubɯhˈɫaɾ]) (/ʊˈbɪk/ uu-BIK) are one of the Circassian tribes, represented by one of the twelve stars on the green-and-gold Circassian flag. Along with the Circassian tribes of Natukhai and Shapsug, the Ubykh formed the Circassian Assembly in 1860. Historically, they spoke the Ubykh language, which never existed in written form and went extinct in 1992 when Tevfik Esenç, the last speaker, died.

== History ==
The Ubykh used to inhabit the capital of Circassia, Sache (Circassian: Шъачэ, lit. seaside) — present-day Sochi, Krasnodar Krai, Russia. The province of the Ubykh tribe was situated between the Shapsug tribe near Tuapse and the Sadz (Dzhigets) in the north of Gagra. The Ubykh tribe were mentioned in book IV of Procopius' De Bello Gothico (The Gothic War), under the name βροῦχοι (Bruchi), a corruption of the native term tʷaχ. In the 1667 book of Evliya Çelebi, the Ubykh were mentioned as Ubúr without any other information.

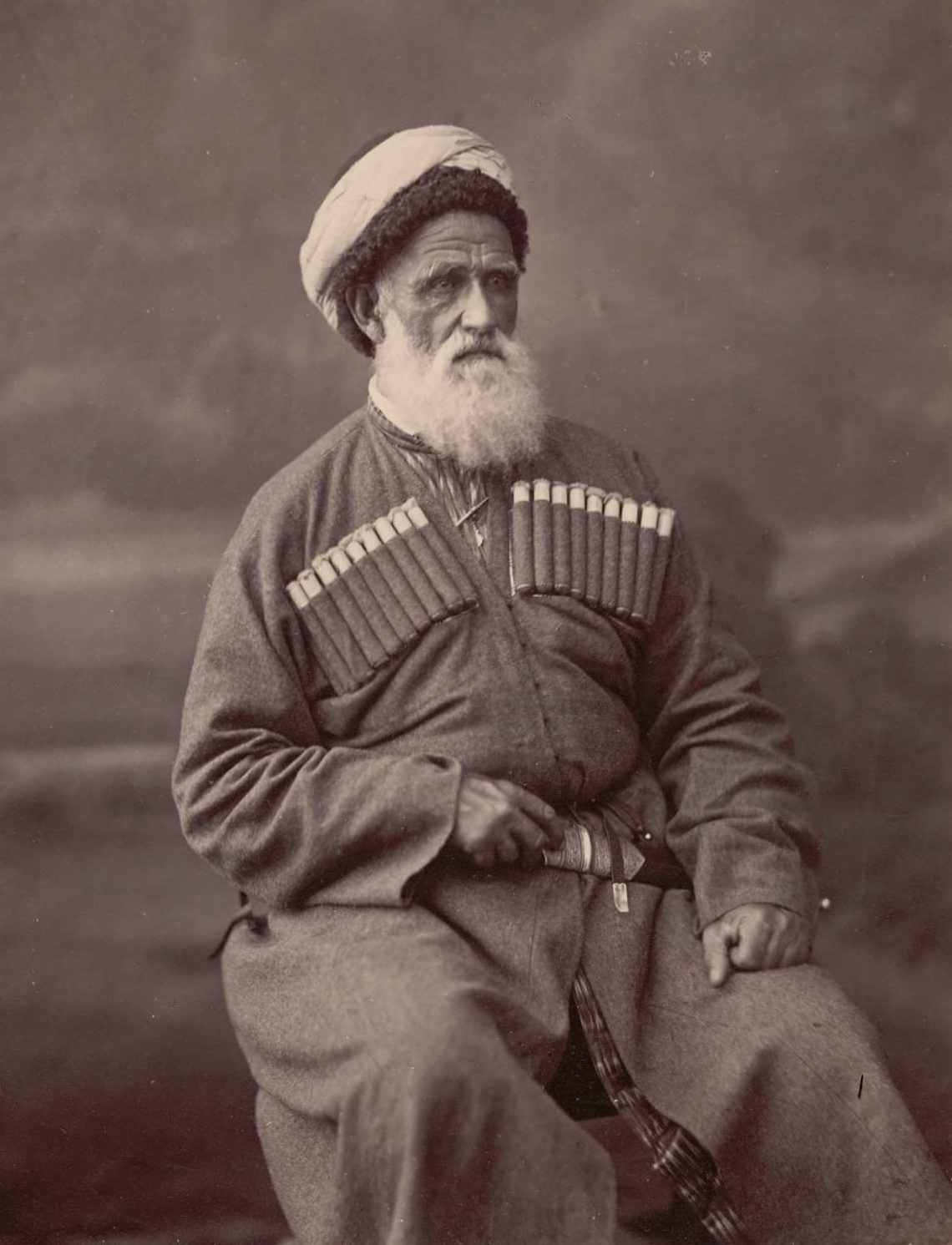
Kirantukh Berzeg (Бэрзэг Кэрэнтыхъу), an Ubykh prince

The Ubykh were semi-nomadic horsemen, and had a finely-differentiated vocabulary related to horses and tack. Some Ubykh also practiced favomancy and scapulimancy. However, the Ubykh gained more prominence in modern times. By 1864, during the reign of Tsar Alexander II, the Russian conquest of the Northwestern Caucasus had been completed. The other Circassian tribes and the Abkhaz were decimated, and the Abaza were partially driven out of the Caucasus.

Faced with the threat of subjugation by the Russian army, the Ubykh, as well as other Muslim peoples of Caucasus, left their homeland en masse beginning on 6 March 1864. By May 21, the entire Ubykh nation had departed from the Caucasus. They eventually settled in a number of villages in western Turkey around the municipality of Manyas.

In order to avoid discrimination, the Ubykh elders encouraged their people to assimilate into Turkish culture. Having abandoned their traditional nomadic culture, they became a nation of farmers. The Ubykh language was rapidly displaced by Turkish and other Circassian dialects; the last native speaker of Ubykh, Tevfik Esenç, died in 1992.

Today, the Ubykh diaspora has been scattered about Turkey and—to a much lesser extent—Jordan. The Ubykh nation per se no longer exists, although those who are of Ubykh ancestry are proud to call themselves Ubykh, and a couple of villages are still found in Turkey where the vast majority of the population is Ubykh by descent.

Ubykh society was patrilineal; many Ubykh descendants today know five, six, or even seven generations of their agnatic ancestry. Nevertheless, as in other Northwest Caucasian tribes, women were especially venerated, and the Ubykh retained a special second person pronoun prefix used exclusively with women (χa-).

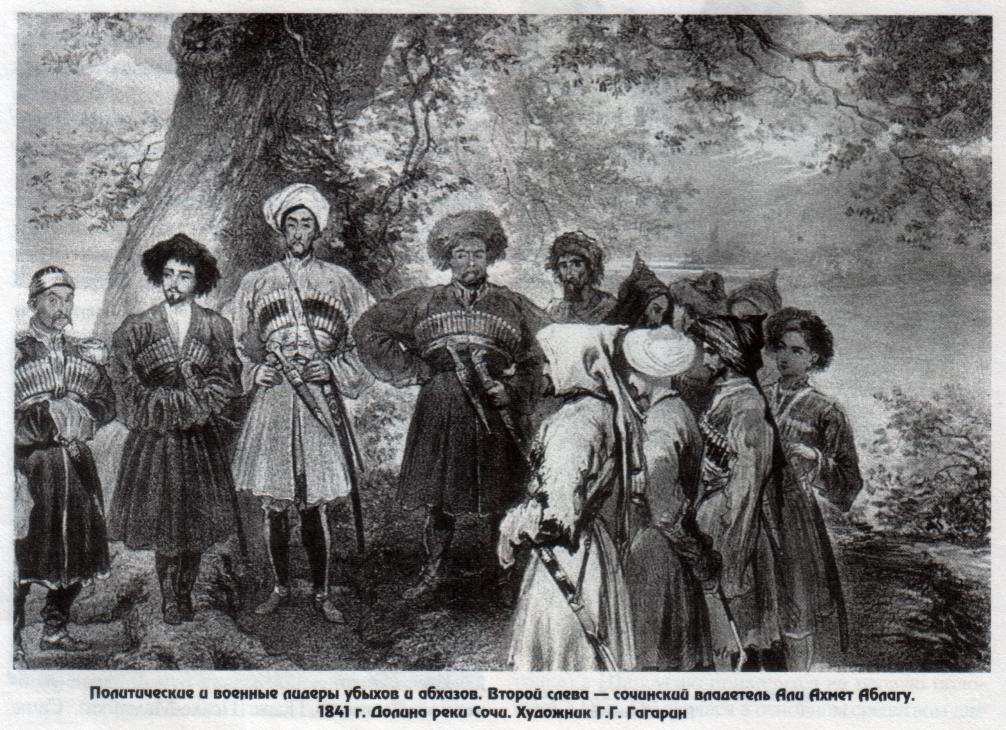
The Ubykh and Abkhazian leaders in the Sochi valley 1841

== Notable people ==
- Keriman Halis Ece (Adyghe: Пщызэмыгъу Кэриман) – winner of Miss Turkey 1932 and Miss Universe 1932 beauty pageants
- Perestü Valide Sultan of Гогэн family – Valide Sultan (Empress mother) of Abdulhamid II of the Ottoman Empire
- Şevkefza Valide Sultan of Заурмыкъу family – Valide Sultan (Empress mother) of Murad V of the Ottoman Empire
- Düzdidil Kadın - consort of Sultan Abdulmejid I of the Ottoman empire.
- Setenay Özbek (Adyghe: Дэчэн Сэтэней) - artist. From the Dechen (Adyghe: Дэчэн) clan.
- Tevfik Esenç (Adyghe: Зэйшъо Тэуфик) - politician, last known speaker of the Ubykh language (1904-1992)
- Çule İbrahim Hakkı Bey (Цулэ Ибрахьим-бей; 1876–1932), Circassian nationalist who founded the Association for the Strengthening of Near Eastern Circassian Rights in 1921, with the aim of creating a joint Greek–Circassian protectorate in the South Marmara region.
- Habil Bey (Дыпшъэ Хьэбил-бей), Ottoman Circassian landowner and philanthropist from Bafra helped rescue 122 Greek civilians from his native region during the Greek genocide in 1921.

== See also ==
- Ubykhia, a region in Circassia
- Other Circassian tribes:
  - Abzakh
  - Besleney
  - Bzhedug
  - Hatuqwai
  - Kabardians
  - Mamkhegh
  - Natukhai
  - Shapsug
  - Temirgoy
  - Yegeruqway
  - Zhaney
