= North Caucasian cooperation with Greece during the Greco-Turkish War (1919–1922) =

Greek and Circassian soldiers on 22 August 1921.

During the Greco-Turkish War (1919–1922), a sizeable proportion of North Caucasian and Northwest Caucasian people living in the Ottoman Empire, mostly Circassians, but also Abkhazians and others, militarily cooperated with Greece, the Greek Army or Greek irregular forces; while others joined the Kuva-yi Milliye.

== Background ==
After the Young Turk revolution and during the era in which the Young Turks ruled the Ottoman Empire (1908–1918), North Caucasians occasionally faced oppressive policies. For example, the Cerkez Ittihad ve Teavun Cemiyeti (Circassian Unity and Mutual Assistance Association), was sanctioned due to its name. Turkish officials also sought to assimilate Circassians into becoming "Turks", through settlement policies aimed at preventing ethnic clustering.

North and South Caucasian cooperation with Greeks was predicted and seen already by the end World War I. For example, Kâzım Karabekir wrote in 1918 how Georgian and other Caucasian corps were expected to ally with Armenian and Greek bands, and noticed that "the Greek and Ossetian forces were also trying to get organized in divisions" in the Russian Army to fight against the Ottoman Empire.

In 1917, a CUP official proposed deporting all Circassians and Georgians from Karesi and Hüdavendigar provinces, though this plan was overruled. Nevertheless, many Circassians were still deported. Donald Bloxham and A. Dirk Moses write:

Circassians, Albanian, Bosnian and Georgian Muslims, Kurds, ‘Gypsies’, and some Jews and Arab groups were moved around the empire, during and after the war, for purposes of assimilation and, in some cases, punishment, though none were so comprehensively dislocated as the Armenians, and none subject to the same near-total murder.

== Circassian volunteers in the Greek Army ==
Circassians who directly cooperated with or joined the Greek Army numbered in the thousands, but they were not counted officially; estimates vary, but they might have numbered up to 20,000 in total. 1,400 was the number specifically identified in a military report as being attached to the II and III Infantry Divisions. A Greek officer of the III Army Corps stated that there were approximately 4,000 Circassians under Greek orders. Circassian chiefs estimated the total strength of their voluntary forces to have been 6,000. A report by the Smyrniote newspaper Amalthia wrote of 20,000 Circassians. A document of the British War Office from 13 May 1922 estimated that "between 6,000 and 10,000 Circassians and approximately 2,000 Turks [were] fighting with the Greek army". They were lauded for their bravery, mobility, and fierce anti-Kemalist zeal. According to the 1921 Inter-Allied Commission of Enquiry, 30,000 Circassians went to eastern Izmit in order to assist the Greek Army.

Circassian volunteers in the Greek Army posing for a picture.

These Circassians notably fought with the Greek Army in the Battle of Kütahya–Eskişehir and in the Battle of Sakarya, among others. They also deployed behind the front to eliminate Kemalist irregulars (Çetes), as well as to disarm hostile Turkish villagers, while mounted Circassian units secured supply routes and ammo convoys for the Greek Army across Anatolia.

Beyond Greek lines at the Turkish village of Cumalıkızık, Circassian volunteers pretended to be Turks, convinced local armed villagers that the Greek army had retreated, led the armed locals straight into Greek lines, and turned them in as prisoners. Individual Circassians also served as terrain guides, including for Nikolaos Plastiras's 5/42nd Evzone Regiment during operations in Susurluk. Meanwhile, Circassian chiefs and riders participated in Greek divisional military sports (e.g. V Division), frequently winning horseback competitions due to their skilled horsemanship.

In July 1921, around the time of the Battle of Kütahya–Eskişehir, representatives of 169 Circassian villages in Balıkesir offered to form a cavalry regiment to fight alongside the Greek Army and sent their request to Nikolaos Theotokis, the Greek Minister of Military Affairs. However, Theotokis never replied.

Circassians fought in the Great Offensive and followed the Greek retreat in August 1922, with Circassian units helping protect retreating Greek soldiers and panicked officers. After the retreat, some of those Circassians began engaging in harsh reprisals against Turkish civilians. A Greek volunteer prisoner, Dimitrios Kirmizas, explicitly noted that Circassians in the army burned and destroyed local Turkish villages due to "open scores"; Circassian communities suffered severely under Mustafa Kemal's forces, who pillaged and burned Circassian villages, executed their people, and drove thousands of refugees into the Greek occupation zone.

During the Turkish recapture of Bursa on 11 September 1922, a force of approximately 300 Abkhazian/Abazin cavalrymen, approaching from the direction of Demirtaş, Osmangazi and Tepecik (a former village between Kazıklı and İsmetiye), fought directly with Turkish soldiers, sheltering the Greek soldiers retreating. The clashes resulted in several casualties.

=== Notable figures ===
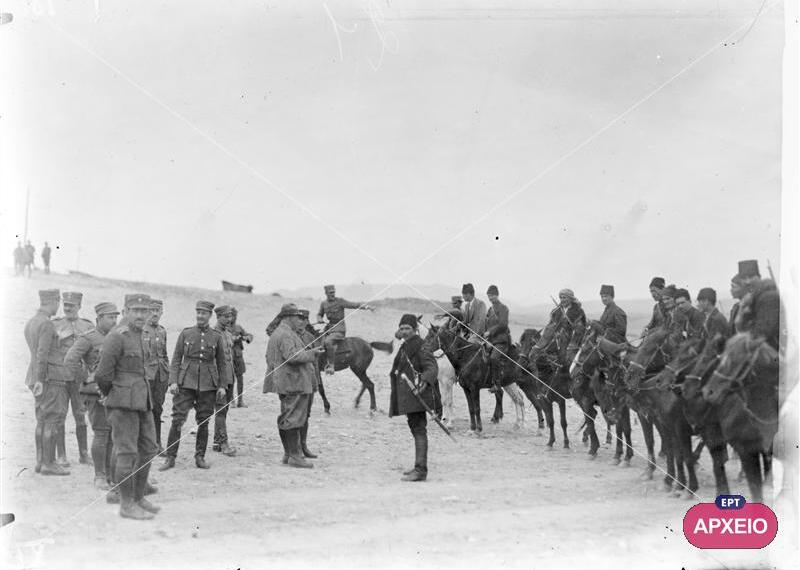
Circassian cavalrymen with officers of the Greek XI Division.

Maanzâde Mustafa Bey was a commander of a Circassian volunteer cavalry unit. He declared to journalist Konstantinos Missailidis in 1921 that the Circassians sought to escape Kemalist "barbarism" and that religion was their only bond with the Turks.

Ibrahim Bey, the Circassian governor (mutasarrif) of Nicomedia (Izmit), stated to Greek war correspondent Konstantinos Faltaits that his people suffered martyrdom at the hands of Kemalist forces, who burned Circassian villages and drove refugees into the Greek occupation zone.

Osman Bey was an ex-captain in the Ottoman army from Çanakkale and nephew of Ahmet Anzavur. Having lost his uncle, alongside all his property and possessions during the conflict, Osman Bey faced extreme hardship and applied at Uşak to join the Greek army. However, the Greek High Commission in Smyrna rejected his application on July 14, 1921, because Greek military law barred foreign officers.

During the Battle of Bergama in 1919, after a Greek battalion was encircled, the Circassian chief Hamit Çavuş, "a sworn enemy of the Turks and a protector of the Greeks", appeared "like a deus ex machina" to break off the encirclement by guiding the Greek troops towards Menemen, along unfamiliar paths, in order to save the force. He was seriously wounded in fighting against a Turkish çete force, but ultimately managed to guide the Greeks to Menemen successfully. Bergama was captured by the Greeks a few days later. Çavuş had previously rendered many services to Joachim of Ephesus. The latter had even provided the former with a letter of recommendation addressed to the Greek Army.

Petros Apostolidis, a Greek reserve doctor who was captured by Kemalist forces in August 1922, mentions in his memoirs that "Many of these Circassians were fighting alongside us, and the Circassian mounted detachments that went ahead of our units as scouts were well known". He also notes that Turks did not trust them, "because they had shown sympathy for the Greek army and quite a few had already cooperated with us". Apostolidis reports a particular incident of a young Circassian soldier, captured alongside him, who fought with Greeks but was taken a prisoner by the Turks:

After they had brutally mistreated him, they stood him upright with his hands tightly bound behind his back in the square of the Railway Station, opposite our room, and any Turkish civilian or soldier who wished would go over, slap him, insult him, or spit on him. From our room I witnessed this sad and savage scene. A young man, with his hands tightly bound behind his back; on his pale, very sympathetic face there was no sign of fear or anguish, but rather a deep melancholy, apathy, and indifference. His eyes were looking sadly downward as he endured the slaps and spitting and listened to the most vulgar insults. Another image from the Greek School religious textbook came to my mind: "Christ before Pilate". They then took him away from there. What became of him is unknown, but his end was certainly a martyr's fate.

Apostolidis also described Circassian women:

A little further from the hospital there was a fountain from which the whole neighborhood fetched water, and many Circassian women passed back and forth to it. They were all pleasant-looking, with graceful figures, and with the jug on their shoulder they reminded you of Caryatids. They looked sympathetically at our prisoners, and it struck me that they did not call them giaour [infidels], but Yunan [Greeks].

Many captured Circassian volunteers were sent to the so-called "labour battalions" by the Turks.

== Circassian Volunteer Corps of Mytilene and Chios Corps ==
Photo from the archives of the Hellenic Broadcasting Corporation: "Turkish horsemen lined up together with Greek officers. They are probably Circassians who cooperated with the Greek Army".

In 1923, Greek authorities formed the Circassian Volunteer Corps of Mytilene, a military unit organized in Mytilene, Lesbos comprising 1,400 Circassians and 50 Armenians, which sought to support Greece if an attack on Thrace by Turkey happened. It was led by Eşref Sencer Kuşçubaşı, with the men receiving 3 drachmas per day plus food from the Greek government, while the leaders received the regular pay of Greek officers. Some pro-Greek Albanians also went to Mytilene to assist the unit.

The Chios Corps was also formed in 1923 in Chios, as a 513-man volunteer unit of Circassians, Armenians, and Greeks under ex-Ottoman Circassian commander Kütahyi Bekir.

These units were deployed in clandestine amphibious raid operations (coups de main) along the Anatolian coastline to raid Turkish posts, rescue stranded Greek refugees or POWs, gather intelligence, and tie down Kemalist troops.In April 1923, nine Circassian volunteers from Emin Bey's group landed at Urla, overran a Turkish outpost, and captured a Turkish soldier of the 57th Division, who was brought back to Mytilene and interrogated by Greek captain Kleanthis Boulalas on May 7, 1923.

On June 25, 1923, ahead of the Treaty of Lausanne, the Greek Minister of War issued a circular ordering the complete disbandment of all irregular volunteer corps, including the abovementioned corps. They were provided with civilian clothing, 15 days of post-discharge pay, food rations for their journey, and travel tickets to their destinations. Some of them chose to re-emigrate to France, the United States, or Cyprus, while others chose to remain in Greece, where they settled in shantytowns alongside Greek refugees.

== Circassian assistance to Greek guerrillas ==
=== Pontus ===
Habil Bey, a Circassian landowner from Bafra, sheltered 122 Greek civilians and paid for their escape by sea in 1921. He subsequently fled to Greece after the Turkish authorities began searching for him.

The Circassians also had good relations with the Pontic Greek guerrillas fighting against the Turks in Pontus, supplying them with food and ammunition, as well as valuable information. Solidarity groups were formed between Greek and Circassian guerrillas; at least one Pontic Greek band is documented to have included Circassians and Armenians. In the Samsun area, the guerrilla groups included 200 Armenians and 100 Circassians, while in the wider area of Erbaa, they included 170 Circassians, Armenians, and people from other Ottoman nationalities. Circassians also protected Greek civilians from Turkish attackes in these areas.

In the Seventh Battle of Dazli, Circassians preemptively informed the Pontic Greek guerrillas of the incoming Turkish attack and also supplied them with weapons, ammunition, clothing and food, ultimately producing a Greek victory.

In a 24 June 1920 letter to Eleftherios Venizelos, during the Greek Summer Offensive, two Pontic Greek notables (Christos Kalandides and Konstantinos Kansiz) wrote that Circassians in Pontus were sympathetic to the Greeks and ready to take up arms against the Turks.

=== Western Anatolia ===
Self-defense units were also organized by the Greeks, Armenians and a group of Circassians in two villages of Adapazarı in Western Anatolia (Sarı-Soğan and Çiftlik). A certain Avedis (probably Armenian) and a certain Stavri (probably Greek) were the leaders of these two self-defense units, with both leading a force of around 100 volunteers each.

In the village of Sıizıköy, civilian refugee Angelis Mavridis stated that forces under Anzavur were welcoming to him and his father, offering them food. He noted that the Circassians were sympathetic toward Greeks.

== Ahmet Anzavur ==
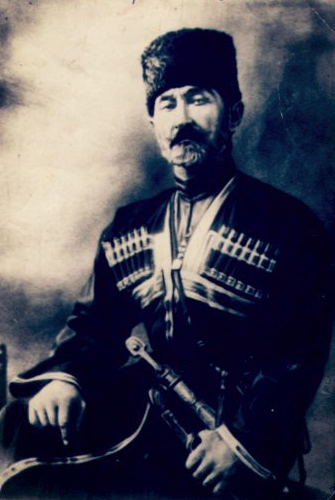
Ahmet Anzavur

Ahmet Anzavur was an Ottoman soldier, pasha, gendarme officer and militia leader of Circassian descent. He began fighting the Turkish National Movement in October 1919 and, although he briefly professed willingness to join the nationalist war effort in November 1919, believing he had been misled, his soon resumed his anti-Kemalist activities and, since then, his stance remained unwavering.

From 1920 onwards, Anzavur instigated several revolts and attacks against the Turkish National Movement which served Greek interests and was "entirely aimed at assisting the Greeks". For his efforts, he was granted the pasha title by Sultan Mehmed VI.

Anzavur was killed by Çerkes Ethem, a then-pro-Turkish Circassian figure who later also became pro-Greek. After the war, Anzavur's son, Kadir, along with other Circassians, was trained for armed expeditions against Ankara in 1923, before the Treaty of Lausanne was signed. He remained in Greece and he was known to gather in a pub in Athens.

== Çerkes Ethem and Green Army ==
The Greeks treat those who surrender and fall into their hands very well. The greatest proof of this is our situation. It is our patriotic duty and a matter of humanity not to be an instrument of evil for the legitimate government of Ankara, whose intentions for the homeland are clearly not pure.

— Çerkes Ethem, March 1921

Left to right: An unnamed Greek officer, Cerkes Ethem, Eşref Sencer (Kuşçubaşı) and Christos D. Karassos. 28 January 1921, Susurluk.

Çerkes Ethem was a notable Circassian guerilla leader, social bandit, efe and soldier who led the "Green Army" and originally fought with the Turkish National Movement before switching sides to cooperate with Greece. According to Mustafa Kemal, Çerkes Ethem had entered into a feud with Ankara since August 1920. By November 1920, the dispute had escalated a lot. The Turks and Ethem's Circassians entered an open conflict in December 1920, when they refused to join Ismet İnönü's regular army forces. On 27 December 1920, he was declared a "rebel". On 8 January 1920, Mustafa Kemal accused Ethem and his brothers, Tevfik and Reşit, of rebellious actions and of providing secrets to the Greek Army. On 26 January 1921, Ethem and his Kuva-yi Seyyare surrendered to the Greeks and proceeded to cooperate with them. He later gave an interview to the Greek newspaper Cosmos explaining his anti-Kemalist stance.

In June 1921, Ethem proposed a joint Greek–Circassian military expedition intended to strike the Turkish National Movement from Pontus. The situation was immediately communicated to Athens, and Çerkes Ethem was urgently summoned there, with Ethem even being brought before King Constantine I of Greece, but the plan never materialized. Nevertheless, Çerkes Reşit, Ethem's brother, personally believed in Constantine, stating that a Greek army of 50,000 men commanded by the King could capture Ankara within 20–30 days.

During the final Greek retreat in August–September 1922, Turkish sources allege that Ethem and his Circassians participated in brutalities against Turks, stating that they took part in burnings, destruction, looting, killings and other atrocities in Manisa, Salihli and Turgutlu.

After the Treaty of Lausanne was officially signed and hostilities were over, Ethem lived in Athens and spent a lot of his time in Greek kafenia and breweries, discussing with other Circassian leaders. Alongside his brothers and several former officers, Ethem led one of the four anti-Kemalist organizations operating in Greece. He devised many plans to assassinate Mustafa Kemal and to overthrow the Kemalist government, supported initially by the Greek government, as well as other European governments.

== Association for the Strengthening of Near Eastern Circassian Rights ==
The Association for the Strengthening of Near Eastern Circassian Rights was a Pan-Caucasianist and Circassian nationalist organization created in 1921 by North Caucasian nationalists who opposed Mustafa Kemal and the Turkish National Movement. Its members included many Circassian notables. The association produced a statement which read, partly, as follows:

This meeting, which is in the form of a congress, undertakes its national rights as a minority based on the national rights as determined by the national principles accepted and declared by the Great Powers at the end of the Great War. The representatives ask for their national demands with the declaration that the Circassians will seek refuge under the Allied Great Powers and its partners, in particular the Greek government, who agreed among themselves to force the acceptance [of these rights] of the losing states...

The population of Circassians today residing in Anatolia is at the very least two million. Circassians defend and maintain their national traditions through language, customs, feelings, and civilization... They are in the contemporary family of civilizations and are a part of the white race and the distinguished Aryan family...

Thirteen years before with the institution of constitutional rule, the Turkish administration became bereft of correct policies. Now filled with feelings [stemming] from Turkism and Turanism, Turkish administrators followed at this unique moment in history a false policy of terrorism, by means of Turkification, towards the various Ottoman nationalities. With the destruction of the nationalities and the destruction of the vital security of non-Turks, the Circassians were stirred with a just grievance coming from a pure desire of self-preservation. Because of these continuous calamities, Circassians have [moved toward] a national goal of self-preservation and commit themselves to armed resistance against the mass murder of the Circassian nation.

Because of this, Circassians have lost thousands of their precious children. Their property and animals have been stolen and their villages burned. In short, Circassians have been and continue to be in a state of defiance in this war despite being allotted no sanctuary and the destruction and seizure of their property...

After seeing that they will not be saved, Circassians decided correctly and naturally to join the Greek army, which promises to preserve them, in the occupation zone. (There is no doubt that Albania and the Arab States similarly sought in foreign saviors well before.) These Circassians, who have struggled for a year and a half and who have saved thousands of innocent Muslims and non-Muslims from mass murder, should be praised for their services...

The understanding Greek government, which is included in the highest levels of civilization and humanity among nations, recognizes no difference among Circassians, Armenians, and especially Rum [Greeks]. It has provided for the welfare of Circassian immigrants and refugees in the form of substance and settlement...

The goals of this petition are:

A – Recognition of our national existence.
B – To make known that the secular Circassian nation lives in constant danger.
C – To advance the demand that the Circassians wish to live as an element of peace under Greek protection in order to protect the Circassians of the Near East from the sins of the Turkish administration.

— Şark-ı Karib Çerkesleri Temin-i Hukuk Cemiyeti, The General Statement of the Circassian Nation to the Great Powers and the Civilized World

The Association was founded by Çule İbrahim Hakkı Bey, a Ubykh-speaking Circassian, who claimed that approximately 5,000 men were under his influence. Müşir Fuad Paşa, an opponent of İbrahim Hakkı, reported that only 300–400 men had joined the Association. Both figures appear to have been tendentious, the former apparently overstating the movement's support and the latter understating it. Many prominent Circassians (such as Kirmastılı Çerkes Davut, Osman Çavuş, Anzavuroglu Kadir Anzavur (Ahmet Anzavur's son), and Kısıkça Çerkes Hasan Bey) believed that there was a Turkish plan to "wipe the Circassians from the region [South Marmara]", which led them to see Greeks as natural allies.

In January 1922, the Association sent a New Year's congratulatory telegram to King Constantine I of Greece. He replied, thanking them, and also expressed his "sincere pleasure to his Circassian friends settled in Asia Minor". A separate letter by a Greek representative of the high command of the Army of Asia Minor read:

I extend my thanks both to you and to the members of the Circassian Association for your wishes on the occasion of the New Year celebrations and for the realization of Greek national objectives.

Bağ Talustan Bey, the president of the association and a representative of Adapazarı, was captured after the 11 September 1922 clashes in Bursa. After the Greek defeat, the association was disbanded.

Despite being nominally "Circassian", the Association was open to and included all North Caucasian people, including Abkhazians, Lazes, Chechens, Lezgins, Abazins, Kumyks and others.

== Turkish reactions ==
The head of the local gendarmerie in Manyas said that:

Any place that they were accepted into our kind homeland, these refugee Circassians would threaten, “Give over the cash box otherwise I will kill you,” before attacking a house and stealing.

Akıncı Ibrahim was already arguing by 1920 that Circassians desired to "crush the Turks" after Ahmet Anzavur's rebellion. After Ethem's defection he, too, blamed all Circassians for Ethem's departure, going even further by stating that:

The Circassians are the ones who have brought disaster upon us. While we were fighting, they would do no other thing other than sell their homeland. Now they are corrupt to the basest level, surrendering to the Greeks while they fill up their saddlebags. The penalty for them is the bullet.

According to historian Ryan Gingeras, "statements such as these suggest that many within the Nationalist camp, particularly in the south Marmara, linked Circassians, crime, treason, and apostasy". Gingeras summarizes:

Ethem’s capitulation to the Greeks was soon followed by an even more vulgar display of “Circassian treason.” In November of 1921, a meeting of provincial Circassian notables was held in Greek-occupied Izmir. In a series of declarations circulated throughout Anatolia and to various Western delegations, the congress, calling itself the Association for the Strengthening of Near Eastern Circassian Rights, declared that it was the intention of all North Caucasians in Anatolia to abandon the Nationalist struggle and to form a joint Greek-Circassian protectorate in northwestern Anatolia. After decades of mistreatment by the Ottoman government following their mass exodus from the Caucasus, the congress argued that Circassians now feared that the National Movement was seeking to exterminate them much as the Ottoman government had previously attempted to wipe out Anatolia’s Greek and Armenian population.

== Abkhazians ==
Abkhazians also fought for Greece or worked for the Greek authorities during the war. After its end, thousands of Abkhazians, especially from Adapazarı, Düzce, Hendek and Bolu, fled to Greece in order to avoid ethnic persecution by the Turks. Many of them later migrated to Abkhazia in the Soviet Union. By 1929, it was reported that 700 of these Abkhazians had stayed in Greece, particularly in Greek Macedonia, adapting to local customs and conditions. According to Abkhaz ethnographer and historian Shalva Inal-ipa in 2017, this number should've at least doubled since then, but there is no exact estimate.

== Flight, expulsions, deportations and ethnic cleansing ==
Historian Сem Kumuk summarizes how many Circassians, as well as Abkhazians, were forced to flee the region after Ethem's defection, in fear of Turkish reprisals. He writes: "A large number of North Caucasian immigrants living in the Southern and Eastern Marmara regions began to worry about their future and sought refuge in Greece towards the end of 1921. These refugee groups, numbering around 4,000 people, were accommodated in Athens and Thessaloniki". Many more thousands were deported and exiled to eastern Anatolia by the Kemalists. Beginning in December 1922, a new, harsher, wave of deportations began. Between May and November 1923, approximately 10,000 North Caucasians from 43 villages were moved forcefully to the Anatolian interior, where they found their villages destroyed upon returning in 1925. During the deportations, the victims suffered "significant losses" and lived in miserable conditions; 45 elderly people and children from one village alone, Üçpınar, died or were killed.

These deportations are considered to have been part of a demographic engineering process. Murat Özden, a notable Circassian activist and author, has called the expulsions "ethnic cleansing" and "genocide". This had long-lasting effects on the North Caucasian population of Turkey after the war, with the Northwest Caucasian languages being repressed and, in some places, explicitly prohibited through the state-backed "Citizen, Speak Turkish!" campaign, as part of the then-ongoing Turkification policies. Notably, the Ubykh language died out entirely in 1992.
