= A. Sumru Özsoy =

Turkish academic and linguist

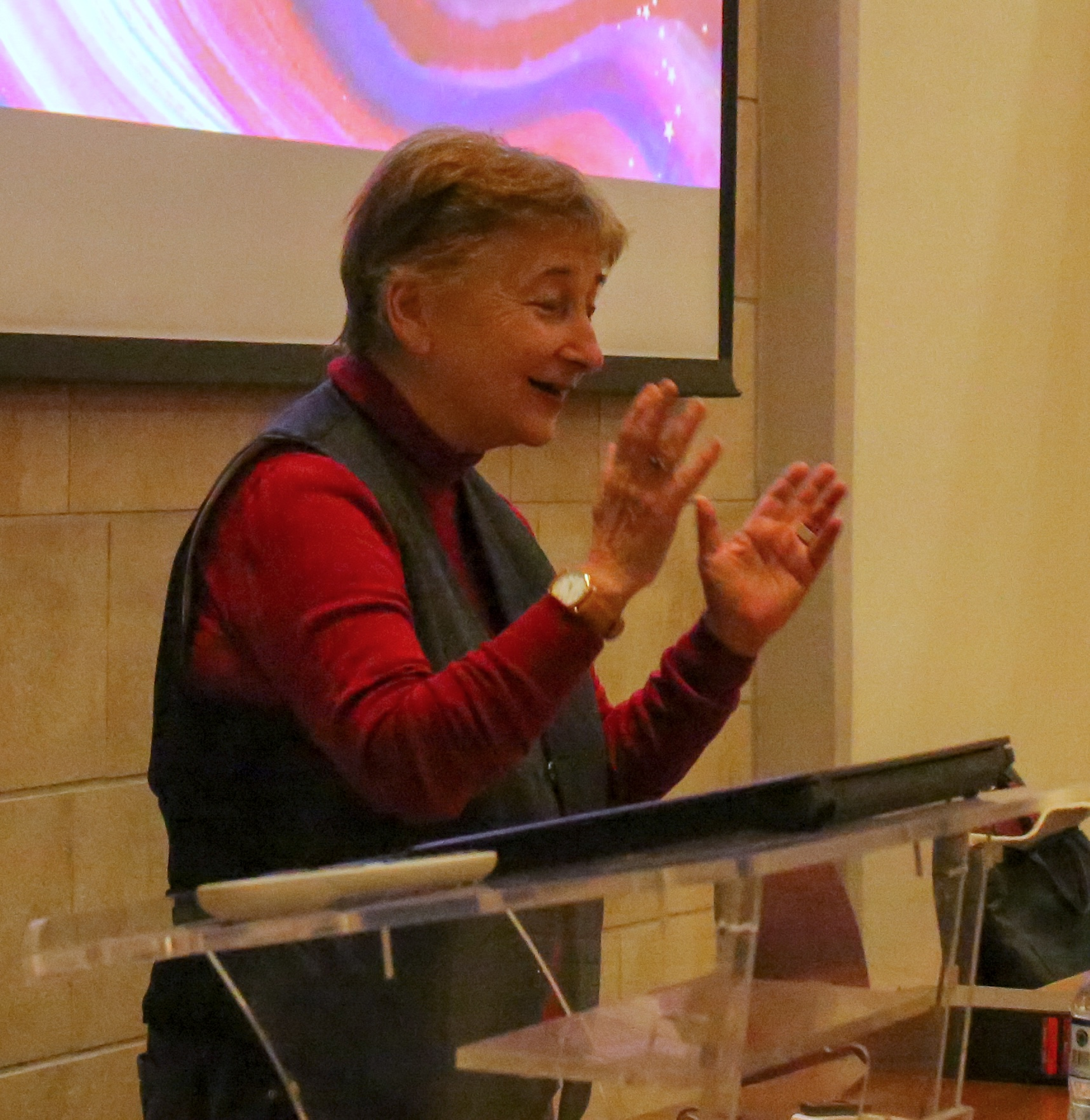
- Professor Sumru Özsoy at Boğaziçi University Ibrahim Bodur Auditorium giving a talk on syntax.
- Citizenship: Turkey
- Education: Robert College; Boğaziçi University; University of Michigan
- Known for: Structure of Turkish
- Scientific career
- Fields: Syntax and morphology of Turkish, cognitive science
- Workplaces: Boğaziçi University

A. Sumru Özsoy is a leading linguist and Turkish academic working at Boğaziçi University, Istanbul.

== Education ==
Özsoy received a bachelor's degree in comparative literature from Robert College in 1971. She obtained a master's degree in linguistics from Boğaziçi University in 1975 and a PhD in linguistics from the University of Michigan in 1983. Title of her PhD thesis is "Kendi-reflexivization in Turkish: A syntactic, semantic and discourse analysis".

== Career ==
Özsoy started her career as an English instructor in 1972. She was a teaching assistant at the University of Michigan from 1977 to 1983. Then she joined Boğaziçi University in 1983 and became professor of linguistics at the Department of Western Languages and Literatures in 1994. She took part in the founding of the Linguistics Department of Boğaziçi University and was forced to retired in 2022 by the appointed rector Naci İnci who has close relations with AK Parti. Her entry to the campus was forbidden unlawfully.

She represents the Turkish Linguistics Community at the Permanent International Committee of Linguists (CPIL).

== Work ==
Özsoy's fields of study are syntax, structure of Turkish, Caucasian languages, cognitive linguistics, sign languages and Turkish Sign Language. She is one of the linguists who studied the now extinct language Ubykh focusing on its syntax. She studied with Tevfik Esenç, the last fluent speaker of Ubykh, in his later years. She organized an international conference, namely Conference on Northwest Caucasian Linguistics, at Boğaziçi University in 1994 in memory of Georges Dumézil, who analysed the language in detail, and Esenç.

She is the author of several books, including Türkçe-Turkish (1999) and Türkçe'nin Yapısı. Sesbilim (2004; Structure of Turkish. Phonology). She has also published numerous articles in her fields of study.

She was the coeditor of Dilbilim Araştırmaları from 1990 to 2011 and has been among the editors of Turkic Languages since 1997 which is published by the Harrassowitz publishing house.
