= Keriman Halis Ece =

Turkish beauty pageant, model and pianist

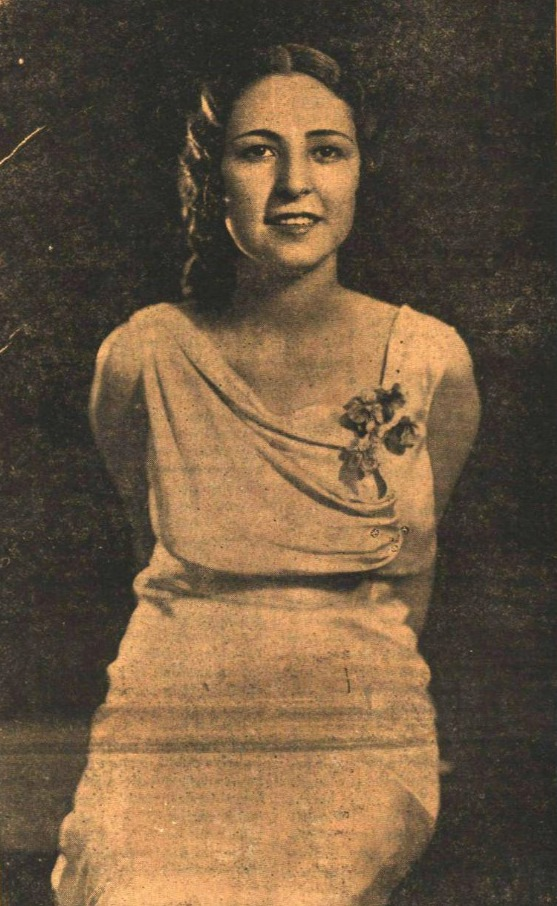
- Cumhuriyet, 4 July 1933.
- Born: Keriman Halis; February 16, 1913; Istanbul, Ottoman Empire
- Died: January 28, 2012 (aged 98); Istanbul, Turkey
- Resting place: Feriköy Cemetery, Istanbul
- Occupations: Beauty pageant titleholder, model, pianist
- Spouses: Dr. Orhan Sanus; Hasip Tamer
- Modeling information
- Height: 1.70 m (5 ft 7 in)
- Hair color: Black
- Eye color: Dark brown
- Education: Lycée de Boğaziçi (Feyziati)
- Children: 3
- Beauty pageant titleholder
- Title: Miss Turkey 1932; Miss Universe 1932
- Years active: 1932–2012
- Major competitions: Miss Turkey, Miss Universe, International Pageant of Pulchritude

Keriman Halis Ece (February 16, 1913 – January 28, 2012) was a Turkish beauty pageant titleholder, pianist, and fashion model who won the Miss Turkey 1932 title. She was also crowned Miss Universe 1932 in Spa, Belgium and thus became Turkey's first Miss Universe.

== Biography ==
Of Ubykh Circassian origin, Keriman Halis was born in Istanbul, Ottoman Empire, as one of the six children of a merchant from Hacıosman, Manyas, Tevfik Halis Bey, in 1913. She grew up in a family with a religious background. During her childhood, her family lived in Fındıkzade, where she was surrounded by French nannies. Her grandfather was a sheikh al-Islam, an advisor to the Ottoman Sultan Mehmed V. According to the Atlanta Constitution, her grandfather was a conservative mighty religious man who kept her secluded from the public in a palace in order to hide her beauty from the public. Only as environment for women became more liberal following the establishment of Turkiye was she allowed to interact with the public with the consent of her grandfather. He father was approached several times in order to allow her to compete in beauty contests which he finally allowed in 1932. She participated in the 1932 Miss Turkiye beauty pageant which had been organized by the newspaper Cumhuriyet since 1929. She was elected the most beautiful Turkish woman in the contest held on July 2, 1932, in İstanbul among eight candidates. Keriman Halis was sent then to the International Pageant of Pulchritude contest held in Spa, Belgium to represent Turkiye. On July 31, 1932, she finished first among competitors from 27 countries, achieving Turkiye's first title at an international beauty contest after three years only of its existence and less than a decade after the founding of the Republic. In 1933 she visited Egypt in a tour organized in cooperation with the Turkish Embassy in Egypt.

== Personal life ==
Her uncle was a renowned operetta composer, Muhlis Sabahattin Ezgi and her aunt a well-known musician and composer Neveser Kökdeş. Her brother is one of the former presidents of the Turkish sports club Galatasaray S.K., Turgan Ece. She was fluent in French and Turkish. Following the introduction of the surname act on June 21, 1934, Mustafa Kemal Atatürk gave her the family name "Ece", which means "queen" in Turkish.

Unlike other beauty pageant winners, Keriman Halis Ece did not pursue a career on stage or in film and settled for domestic life. She was first married to Orhan Sanus, with whom she had a son, Sezai Biltin Sanus, and a daughter, Ece Sanus. Her second marriage was to the merchant Hasip Tamer Bey; together they had a son, Cenk Tamer.

She died at her daughter's home of heart failure on January 28, 2012, nineteen days shy of her 99th birthday. She was laid to rest at the Feriköy Cemetery, Istanbul.

== Reception ==
As a Turkish beauty queen, she was a symbol of the new liberty of women in the Middle East, following the end of World War I and was celebrated in the Arab press in Egypt and the Syrian Mandate. Having come back to Turkey, President Mustafa Kemal (Atatürk) who was thrilled by the fact that an international jury chose a Turkish girl as the Miss Universe, congratulated her for her manifestation of "the noble beauty of the Turkish race".

Awards
Preceded by Naşide Saffet Esen	Miss Turkey; 1932	Succeeded by Nazire Hanım
Preceded by Belgium; Netta Duchâteau (Galveston, United States)	Miss Universe (Spa, Belgium); 1932	Succeeded by Egypt; Charlotte Wassef (Brussels, Belgium)

== See also ==
- Azra Akın
