= Brian George Hewitt =

English linguist

Brian George Hewitt FBA
- Born: 11 November 1949 (age 76); Doncaster, England
- Education: University of Cambridge
- Occupation: Linguist
- Spouse: Zaira Kiazimovna Khiba
- Children: 2
- Website: http://georgehewitt.net/

Brian George Hewitt, FBA (born 11 November 1949) is an English academic linguist who is Emeritus Professor of Caucasian languages as the School of Oriental and African Studies (Soas), University of London. Since 1993, he has been the Honorary Consul of the self-proclaimed Republic of Abkhazia in Great Britain, despite the fact that the Great Britain does not actually recognizes Abkhazia and that the British Foreign Office requested him not to use this title.

== Life ==
=== Early life ===
Hewitt was born in Doncaster, England into the family of Thomas Douglas and Joan Hewitt (née Cousins). He received his primary and secondary education in his hometown where he attended the former Doncaster Grammar School for boys (now called the Hall Cross Academy), which has been in existence since at least 1350. Here he focussed his studies on Latin, Ancient Greek, and ancient history, which he completed in 1968.

=== Study at Cambridge and study tours ===
He then enrolled at St John's College, Cambridge where he read Classics. During his time in Cambridge, he received (in addition to his Open Henry Arthur Thomas Scholarship in Classics) a College Henry Arthur Thomas Travel Grant. In addition, he was awarded a John Stewart of Rannoch Scholarship during his second undergraduate-year and at the end of that year won from his college a Graves Prize. He successfully completed undergraduate studies in 1972, earning a Bachelor's degree (BA), selecting for his final year of the Classics Tripos the philology option (Group E). He continued his studies in 1972–1973 for the Cambridge Diploma in Linguistics, having been awarded a Warr Classical Studentship. His dissertation for the Diploma was entitled Some Semantic Aspects of Complementation in Latin. In 1976 he took his Master of Arts (MA) degree. Later in 1982, he received his PhD; his doctoral dissertation compared subordination in the Georgian and Abkhaz languages.

After flirting with the idea of joining the police service in Liverpool, he decided to embark in 1973 on a doctorate, wanting to compare/contrast Ancient Greek with another Indo-European language. The advice of Cambridge’s then-Emeritus Professor of Sanskrit, the distinguished Indo-Europeanist Sir Harold Bailey, whom he consulted was to choose either Lithuanian or Armenian. Initially Hewitt thought that Lithuanian might be the more attractive option. However, as he would need a long-distance adviser for whichever language he selected (Cambridge not having a specialist in either), he contacted Oxford’s Professor of Comparative Slavonic Philology, Robert Auty, for Lithuanian and Oxford’s Professor of Armenian, Charles Dowsett, for Armenian. Prof. Auty proved difficult to reach and by the time his positive response was received, Hewitt had already elected to work on Old Armenian under the general supervision of Alan Sommerstein, but, when the latter moved to Nottingham in 1974, Bernard Comrie took over.

Although for two years Hewitt was gathering relevant data for Greek and Armenian, he was developing an ever keener interest in Georgian and other Caucasian languages. He persuaded the British Council to send him for the academic year 1975–1976 to Tbilisi State University (Georgian SSR) to receive tuition in Georgian. This was to change his life, for he soon became acquainted with Abkhazian post-graduate student Zaira Kiazimovna Khiba, whom he married on 25 June 1976 in Tbilisi, and with whom he has two daughters: Amra Shukia Hewitt and Gunda Amza-Natia Hewitt, each of whom has two children.

From 1976 to 1978 he de-registered as a doctoral student and worked as research-assistant on a project on the Non-Slavic languages of the USSR led by Bernard Comrie, which was funded by the British Social Science Research Council. Hewitt was able to contribute materials on Caucasian languages, and thereby began his career as a caucasologist.

In 1978, he received the Marjory Wardrop Scholarship (administered by the Oxford-based Board of Management of the Wardrop Fund) to study the differences between Georgian, Old Georgian and Abkhazian, and for this he re-registered for a doctorate (albeit with a revised topic) at Cambridge University’s Faculty of Modern and Medieval Languages and Linguistics, where ultimately he defended his thesis which was now entitled Comparative-contrastive Study of the Syntax of Subordinate Clauses in Georgian and Abkhaz. During the Academic Year 1979-1980 he made another study-trip to Soviet Georgia on a second exchange-visit courtesy of the British Council, where he gathered further materials for inclusion in the aforementioned doctoral thesis, together with other materials for later use.

=== Academic career ===
After his second return from Georgia, he became a Lecturer in Linguistics at the University of Hull where he worked from 1981 to 1988. In 1982, his doctorate was awarded following a viva voce examination before internal examiner Prof. W. Sidney Allen and external examiner Prof. David Marshall Lang, though his publishing career had already begun with the appearance in 1979 of Lingua Descriptive Studies 2: Abkhaz, which he co-authored with his wife.

When the Linguistics Department at the University of Hull was closed in 1988, he was transferred to London where he worked firstly as a lecturer in Caucasian languages and Linguistics at the School of Oriental and African Studies (SOAS). In 1992, he became Reader in Caucasian languages there and finally a Professor in 1996.

During his academic career, he has been a member of the Board of Management of the Marjory Wardrop Fund in Oxford (since 1983); in 1985, he became a member of the editorial board of the French publication Revue des Etudes Géorgiennes et Caucasiennes which was published regularly until 1993. He was on the Editorial board of the journal Central Asia Survey (CAS) from 1993 to 2015 and has similarly served since 2015 on the board of Journal of Caucasian Studies (JOCAS).

From 1985 to 1990 he was a member of the Council of the Philological Society and from 1986 to 1990 became the first president of the Societas Caucasologica Europaea. In 1997 he was elected a Fellow of the British Academy. Since 1995 he has been an honorary member of the International Circassian Academy of Sciences, and an honorary member of the Abkhazian Academy of Sciences. in 2004 he was awarded Abkhazia’s Order of Honour and Glory (2nd grade) and holds medals from both Abkhazia's Ministry of Foreign Affairs and Abkhazia's Ministry of Defence.

In 2015 he retired from SOAS.

=== Hewitt's role in the Georgian-Abkhazian conflict ===
Until 1989, he continued to visit Soviet Georgia to gather additional material for his research and noted with growing alarm, largely on the basis of what was being written in such outlets as the weekly organ of the Georgian Writers' Union Literary Georgia (Georgian: ლიტერატურული საქართველო, Russian: Литературная Грузия), the growing tension between the Abkhazians and the Georgians. It was in 1989 that Georgia's relationship with him suddenly changed when, despite his wife's warning, he sent to the editorial office 'Literary Georgia' his Open Letter to the Georgian People (in Georgian) in May of that year.

Though initially unpublished in Tbilisi, its content became known in Abkhazia, thanks to the posting in the centre of Abkhazia's capital, Sukhumi, of a Russian translation. It was only after the first fatal clashes between Georgians and Abkhazians in Sukhumi on 15–16 July and Hewitt's subsequent meeting with the head of the Georgian Communist Party, Givi Gumbaridze, in Ochamchire on 17 July that the 'letter' was published in 'Literary Georgia' on 21 July. Although the 'Letter' was designed to explain to its Georgian readership something of Abkhazian grievances against domination from Tbilisi and to warn of the dangers he foresaw to be the likely consequence if Georgian society were to be persuaded to support the chauvinist, anti-minority politics of the likes of the late Merab Kostava and the forthcoming president of Georgia, Zviad Gamsakhurdia, Georgians rather saw his intervention as a 'stab in the back'. Hewitt became an instant target of abuse and mud-slinging across the entire Georgian media.

As a result of the events of the War in Abkhazia from 1992 to 1993, he became a supporter of independent Abkhazia and accepted an offer from Abkhazian leader Vladislav Ardzinba to serve as its Honorary Consul in the United Kingdom, virtually earning the title of Persona non grata in Georgia. Nevertheless, in the mid-2000s (c.2006) he considered returning to Tbilisi to discuss participation in a research-project funded by the Volkswagenstiftung. However, the day before he planned to book his ticket, he was alerted to a question that had been posed that week in the Parliament of Georgia to Georgia's ambassador-elect to the UK, namely: "When you get to London, what will you do about the anti-Georgian activities of George Hewitt?" Seeing this, Hewitt immediately decided that he would make no further visits to the Republic of Georgia which over the years called for his dismissal from his academic posts. The British Foreign Office was prevailed upon to request that he desist from calling himself honorary consul of a state that the British government does not recognize. However, when asked to cite the treaty or convention which prohibits British citizens from calling themselves whatever they wish, the Foreign and Commonwealth Office accepted that there exists no such prohibition and simply requested that he cease so styling himself.

He was present in person in Abkhazia on 26 August 2008 when Russia declared its recognition of the independence of Abkhazia and South Ossetia, and witnessed the celebrations in Sukhumi. However, he remains skeptical about the likelihood of wider recognition of Abkhazia's independence, even though he believes that this would be the best outcome for the future not only of the young republic but also of Georgia too. Indeed he would like to see Georgia being the next to offer such recognition in the belief that, if Georgia were to take this step, the rest of the world would surely follow, and normal inter-state, neighbourly relations would be established between the two republics and one of the world’s frozen conflicts would be resolved.

Although he has written several important scholarly works on Abkhaz and has a good understanding of its grammar, he does not speak the language, though he does speak Georgian.

On 23 July 2025 his wife Zaira died.

== Works ==
- Lingua Descriptive Studies 2: Abkhaz, 1979 (with wife Zaira Khiba)
- Svan-English Dictionary, 1985, (editor and writer of the introduction)
- Typology of Subordination in Georgian and Abkhaz, Mouton de Gruyter, 1987
- Indigenous Languages of the Caucasus 2: North West Caucasus, Caravan Books, 1989 (as editor and contributor)
- Caucasian Perspectives, Lincom Europa, 1992 (as editor and contributor)
- Subject, Voice and Ergativity: Selected Essays, SOAS, 1995 (as editor and contributor)
- Georgian: A Learner's Grammar, Routledge, 1995
- Georgian: A Structural Reference Grammar of Georgian, Benjamins / SOAS Handbook of Oriental Languages, 1995
- Central Asian Survey (volume 14.1, 1995; paper on pages 43–189 about the Caucasus)
- A Georgian Reader, SOAS, 1996
- Abkhaz Newspaper Reader (with supplements), Dunwoody Press, Maryland, 1998 (with wife Zaira Khiba)
- The Abkhazians: A Handbook, Curzon Press, 1998 (as co-author)
- The Languages of the Caucasus: scope for study and survival (Inaugural Lecture), 1998
- Central Asian Survey (vol. 22.4, 2003; paper on the all-day SOAS conference on Chechnya in November 2002, co-organized by Hewitt)
- Introduction to the Study of the Languages of the Caucasus, Lincom Europa, 2004
- Abkhazian Folktales (with grammatical introduction, translation, notes and vocabulary), Lincom Europa, 2005
- Pages from Abkhazian Folklore, Sukhumi, 2008 (with Zurab Dzhapua)
- Abkhaz: A Comprehensive Self-tutor, Lincom Europa, 2010
- Discordant Neighbours. A Reassessment of the Georgian-Abkhazian and Georgian-South Ossetian Conflicts, Brill, 2013
- Various articles on Caucasian languages and politics in various encyclopaedias, Central Asian Survey, Bedi Kartlisa, Revue des Etudes Géorgiennes et Caucasiennes.
