= I'll Be the Tornado =

Studio album by Dads
- Released: October 14, 2014
- Genre: Emo, math rock, indie rock, punk rock
- Label: 6131 Records
- Producer: Neil Strauch

Dads chronology
Pretty Good (2013)	I'll Be the Tornado (2014)

I'll Be the Tornado is the second and final studio album by American emo band Dads. It was released on October 14, 2014 in the United States.

== Critical reception ==
Professional ratings
Aggregate scores
Source	Rating
Metacritic	81/100
Review scores
Source	Rating
AbsolutePunk	(7.5/10)
Pitchfork	(7.5/10)
PopMatters	8/10 stars
PunkNews.org	4/5 stars

I'll Be the Tornado has received positive reviews from music critics. Metacritic, which assigns a normalized rating out of 100 to reviews from mainstream critics, the album received an average score of 81, based on five reviews.

== Track listing ==
No.	Title	Length
1.	"Grand Edge, MI"	4:46
2.	"Chewing Ghosts"	3:45
3.	"The Romantic Ocean"	2:44
4.	"Fake Knees"	4:36
5.	"Sold Year / Transitions"	4:01
6.	"You Hold Back"	3:37
7.	"But"	3:53
8.	"Sunburnt Jet Wings"	2:24
9.	"Take Back Today"	3:45
10.	"Only You"	7:21
11.	"Do You Still Think of Me?"	5:50

== Charts ==
Chart (2014)	Peak position
US Top Heatseekers Albums (Billboard)	17
