= American Radass (This Is Important) =

Studio album by Dads
- Released: August 7, 2012
- Genre: Emo, math rock, indie rock
- Label: 6131 Records

Dads chronology
Brush Your Teeth, Again ;) (2011)	American Radass (This Is Important) (2012)	Pretty Good (2013)

American Radass (This Is Important) is the first studio album by the American emo band Dads. It was released on August 7, 2012 by Flannel Gurl Records.

== Critical reception ==
Professional ratings
Review scores
Source	Rating
AbsolutePunk	(8.6/10)

American Radass (This Is Important) has received critical acclaim from music critics. At Metacritic, which assigns a normalized rating out of 100 to reviews from mainstream critics, the album received an average score of 83, based on two reviews. Vulture ranked the song "Shit Twins" at No. 95 on their list of the 100 Greatest Emo Songs of All Time.

== Track listing ==
No.	Title	Length
1.	"If Your Song Title Has The Word "Beach" in It, I'm Not Listening to It."	2:38
2.	"Get to the Beach!"	1:47
3.	"Honestly, Chroma, Q&A"	2:10
4.	"Aww, C'mon Guyz"	3:01
5.	"Shit Twins"	6:55
6.	"Grunt Work (The '69 Sound)"	1:09
7.	"Groin Twerk"	1:47
8.	"Big Bag of Sandwiches"	3:31
9.	"Bakefast at Piffany's"	4:20
10.	"Heavy to the Touch (Think About Tonight, Forget About Tomorrow)"	4:18
