= Northwest Caucasian languages =

Language family

Northwest Caucasian
- West Caucasian; Circassic; Abkhazo–Circassian; Abkhazo–Adyghe; North Pontic; Pontic
- Geographic distribution: Ciscaucasia in Eastern Europe
- Linguistic classification: One of the world's primary language families
- Proto-language: Proto-Northwest Caucasian
- Subdivisions: Abaza–Abkhaz; Circassian; Ubykh †

Language codes
- Glottolog: abkh1242
- Linguasphere: 42-A
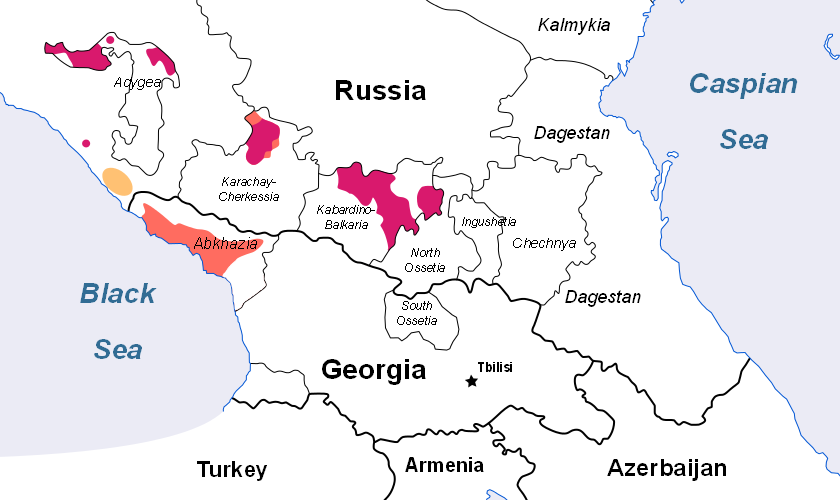
- Circassian Abaza–Abkhaz Ubykh (extinct)

The Northwest Caucasian languages, also called West Caucasian, Circassic, Abkhazo–Circassian, Abkhazo–Adyghe, North Pontic, or sometimes Pontic languages (from Ancient Greek, pontos, referring to the Black Sea, in contrast to the Northeast Caucasian languages as the Caspian languages), is a family of languages spoken in the northwestern Caucasus region, chiefly in three Russian republics (Adygea, Kabardino-Balkaria, Karachay-Cherkessia), the disputed territory of Abkhazia, Georgia, and Turkey, with smaller communities scattered throughout the Middle East.

The group's relationship to any other language family is uncertain and unproven. One language, Ubykh, became extinct in 1992, while all of the other languages are in some form of endangerment, with UNESCO classifying all as either "vulnerable", "endangered", or "severely endangered". Within the Northwest Caucasian languages, only Abkhaz has a first-set code in the ISO 639 standard.

The Northwest Caucasian languages possess highly complex sets of consonant distinctions paired with a lack of vowel distinctions, often providing archetypical cases of vertical vowel systems, also known as "linear" vowel systems.

== Main features ==
=== Phonetics ===
Linguistic reconstructions suggest that both the richness of the consonantal systems and the poverty of the vocalic systems may be the result of a historical process, whereby vowel features such as labialization and palatalization were reassigned to adjacent consonants. For example, ancestral */ki/ may have become /kʲə/ and */ku/ may have become /kʷə/, losing the old vowels */i/ and */u/ but gaining the new consonants /kʲ/ and /kʷ/. The linguist John Colarusso has further postulated that some instances of this may also be due to the levelling of an old grammatical class prefix system (so */w-ka/ may have become /kʷa/), on the basis of pairs like Ubykh /ɡʲə/ vs. Kabardian and Abkhaz /ɡʷə/ heart. This same process is claimed by some to lie behind the development of labiovelars in Proto-Indo-European, which once neighboured Proto-NWC.

==== Lack of distinctive vowels and wealth of distinctive consonants ====
The entire family is characterised by a paucity of phonemic vowels (two or three, depending upon the analysis) coupled with rich consonantal systems that include many forms of secondary articulation. Ubykh (Ubyx), for example, had two vowels and probably the largest inventory of consonants outside Southern Africa.

=== Grammar ===
Northwest Caucasian languages have rather simple noun systems, with only a handful of cases at the most, coupled with highly agglutinative verbal systems that can contain almost the entire syntactic structure of the sentence. All finite verbs are marked for agreement with three arguments: absolutive, ergative, and indirect object, and there are also a wide range of applicative constructions. There is a split between "dynamic" and "stative" verbs, with dynamic verbs having an especially complex morphology. A verb's morphemes indicate the subject's and object's person, place, time, manner of action, negative, and other types of grammatical categories.

All Northwest Caucasian languages are left-branching, so that the verb comes at the end of the sentence and modifiers such as relative clauses precede a noun.

Northwest Caucasian languages do not generally permit more than one finite verb in a sentence, which precludes the existence of subordinate clauses in the Indo-European sense. Equivalent functions are performed by extensive arrays of nominal and participial non-finite verb forms, though Abkhaz appears to be developing limited subordinate clauses, perhaps under the influence of Russian.

== Classification ==
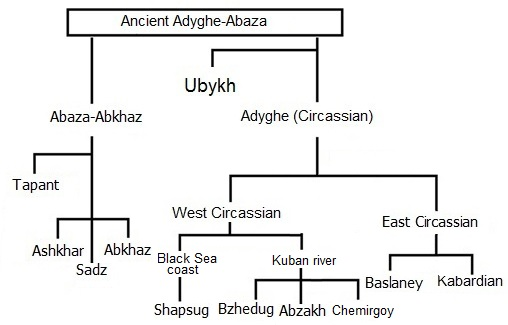
Northwest Caucasian family tree

Percentage of total Northwest Caucasian speakers, by language
1. Kabardian (67.0%)
2. Adyghe (23.5%)
3. Abkhaz (7.60%)
4. Abaza (1.90%)
5. Ubykh (0.00%)

There are five recognized languages in the Northwest Caucasian family: Abkhaz, Abaza, Kabardian or East Circassian, Adyghe or West Circassian, and Ubykh. They are classified as follows:

- Northwest Caucasian family
  - Abaza–Abkhaz languages
    - Abaza (49,800 speakers)
    - Abkhaz (190,110 speakers)
  - Circassian
    - Adyghe (590,000)
    - Kabardian (East Adyghe) (1,685,000)
  - Ubykh †

=== Circassian dialect continuum ===
Circassian (Cherkess) is a cover term for the series of dialects that include the literary languages of Adyghe and Kabardian.

==== Adyghe ====
Adyghe is one of the more widely spoken Northwest Caucasian languages. It has 500,000 speakers spread throughout Russia and the Middle East: 280,000 in Turkey; 125,000 in Russia, where it is official in the Republic of Adygea; 45,000 in Jordan, 25,000 in Syria, 20,000 in Iraq, and 4,000 in Israel. There is even a small community in the United States. Four main dialects are recognised: Temirgoy, Abadzekh, Shapsugh and Bzhedugh, as well as many minor ones such as Hakuchi spoken by the last speakers of Ubykh in Turkey. Adyghe has many consonants: between 50 and 60 consonants in the various Adyghe dialects but it has only three phonemic vowels. Its consonants and consonant clusters are less complex than the Abkhaz–Abaza dialects.

An example of spoken Adyghe and Kabardian.

==== Kabardian ====
Kabardian has just over one million speakers: 550,000 in Turkey and 450,000 in Russia, where it is an official language of the republics of Kabardino-Balkaria and Karachay-Cherkessia. Kabardian has the fewest consonants of any North-Western Caucasian language, with 48, including some rather unusual ejective fricatives and a small number of vowels. Kabardian itself has several dialects, including Terek, the literary standard, and Besleney, which is intelligible with both Terek and Adyghe. Unlike the Adyghe, Kabardian lost many of the consonants that existed in the Proto-Circassian language, for example, the consonants /ʃʷʼ, ʐʷ, ʂʷ, ʐ, ʂ, tsʷ, dzʷ/ became /fʼ, v, f, ʑ, ɕ, f, v/.

=== Abkhaz–Abaza dialect continuum ===
==== Abkhaz ====
Abkhaz has 100,000 speakers in Abkhazia (a de facto independent republic, but a de jure autonomous entity within Georgia), where it is the official language, and an unknown number of speakers in Turkey. It has been a literary language from the beginning of the 20th century. Abkhaz and Abaza may be said to be dialects of the same language, but each preserves phonemes which the other has lost. Abkhaz is characterised by unusual consonant clusters and one of the world's smallest vowel inventories: It has only two distinctive vowels, an open vowel /a/ and a mid vowel /ə/. Next to palatalized or labialized consonants, /a/ is realized as [e] or [o], and /ə/ as [i] or [u]. There are three major dialects: Abzhuy and Bzyp in Abkhazia and Sadz in Turkey.

==== Abaza ====
Abaza has some 45,000 speakers, 35,000 in Russia and 10,000 in Turkey. It is a literary language, but nowhere official. It shares with Abkhaz the distinction of having just two phonemic vowels. Abaza is phonologically more complex than Abkhaz, and is characterised by large consonant clusters, similar to those that can be found in Georgian. There are two major dialects, Tapant and Ashkhar. Some are partially intelligible with Abkhaz.

=== Ubykh ===
Ubykh forms a third branch, with parallels to both Adyghe and Abkhaz. The population switched to speaking Adyghe, and Ubykh became extinct on 7 October 1992, with the death of Tevfik Esenç. A dialectal division within Ubykh was suspected by Georges Dumézil, but the divergent form he described in 1965 was never investigated further. With eighty-one consonants, Ubykh had perhaps the largest inventory in the world aside from the Kxʼa and Tuu families of southern Africa with their extensive system of clicks. There are pharyngealised consonants and a four-way place contrast among sibilants. It was the only Northwest Caucasian language never to have a literary form.

== See also ==
- Proto-Northwest Caucasian language
- Northeast Caucasian languages
- North Caucasian languages

== Sources ==
- Burney, Charles (2004). Historical dictionary of the Hittites. Historical Dictionaries of Ancient Civilizations and Historical Era. Lanham, MD: Scarecrow Press. ISBN 978-0810849365.
- Chirikba, Viacheslav (1996). Common West Caucasian. The Reconstruction of its Phonological System and Parts of its Lexicon and Morphology. Leiden: Research School CNWS, School of Asian, African, and Amerindian Studies. ISBN 978-9073782716.
- Colarusso, John (1997). "Phyletic Links between Proto-Indo-European and Proto–Northwest Caucasian". The Journal of Indo-European Studies. 25 (1–2). Chicago Linguistic Society: 119–151.
- Colarusso, John (2003). "Further Etymologies between Indo-European and Northwest Caucasian". In Holisky, Dee Ann; Tuite, Kevin (eds.). Current Trends in Caucasian, East European and Inner Asian Linguistics, Papers in Honor of Howard Aronson. Current Issues in Linguistic Theory. Amsterdam: John Benjamins Publishing Company. pp. 41–60. ISBN 978-1588114617.
- Hoiberg, Dale H., ed. (2010). "Abkhazo-Adyghian languages". Encyclopedia Britannica. Vol. I: A-ak Bayes (15th ed.). Chicago, IL: Encyclopedia Britannica Inc. p. 33. ISBN 978-1-59339-837-8.
- Nichols, Johanna (March 1986). "Head-Marking and Dependent-Marking Grammar". Language. 62 (1). Linguistic Society of America: 56–119. doi:10.1353/lan.1986.0014. JSTOR 415601. S2CID 144574879.
