= Tevfik Esenç =

Last known speaker of the Ubykh language (1904–1992)

- Tevfik Esenç, aged 57
- Born: 1904; Hacıosman, Ottoman Empire
- Died: 7 October 1992 (aged 88); Hacıosman, Turkey
- Known for: being the last native speaker of Ubykh
- Movement: Circassian movement

Tevfik Esenç (Turkish pronunciation: [tevˈfic esɛnt͡ʃ]; Adyghe: Зэйшъо Тэуфик; 1904 – 7 October 1992) was an Ubykh Circassian citizen of Turkey, known for being the last speaker of the Ubykh language. After his death in 1992, the Ubykh language went extinct despite the efforts and work of numerous linguists to revive it. Nevertheless, Esenç is single-handedly responsible for the world's extensive and detailed knowledge of the Ubykh language and culture. He was fluent in Ubykh, Adyghe, and Turkish.

== Biography ==
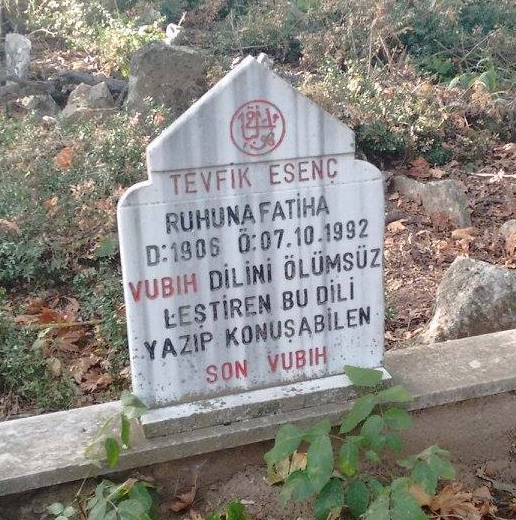
Esenç's gravestone. Tevfik Esenç [recite] a Fatiha for his soul Who immortalised the Ubykh language, the last Ubykh who could write and speak this language

Esenç was raised by his Ubykh-speaking grandparents for a time in the village of Hacıosman (Ubykh: Lek'uaşüa /lɜkʷʼɐ́ɕʷɜ/; Adyghe: Hundjahabl) in Turkey, and he served a term as the muhtar (mayor) of that village, before receiving a post in the civil service of Istanbul. There, he was able to do a great deal of work with the French linguist Georges Dumézil and his associate Georges Charachidzé to help record his language, although not all the writings of Charachidzé (1930–2010) have been published. Others who met Esenç and produced work on Ubykh are: the Norwegian Hans Vogt (1903–86); the British George Hewitt, who made recordings with Esenç in Istanbul; the Abkhazian Viacheslav Chirikba, who has written on Ubykh settlements and Ubykh surnames; and the Turkish linguist A. Sumru Özsoy.

Having an excellent memory and understanding quickly the goals of Dumézil and the other linguists who came to visit him, he was a primary source of not only the Ubykh language, but also of the mythology, culture history, and customs of the Ubykh people. He spoke Turkish, Ubykh, and Adyghe (West Circassian), allowing some comparative work to be done between these two members of the Northwest Caucasian family. A purist, his idiolect of Ubykh was considered by Dumézil as the closest thing to a standard "literary" Ubykh language that existed.

He finished his work for Ubykh with the following speech to his long-time collaborator Georges Charachidzé:

My great friend Prof. Charachidzé,

"Much talk is not without lies; much wealth is not without a shepherd" (Ubykh Proverb).

Please forgive me if I have made any mistakes. This is how I am finishing my work with Ubykh. From this day forward, if I find someone who knows more Ubykh than I do, I will speak with them too.

You are now the Ubykh language. From today on, you are the one who will explain it and speak it.

I am calling out to those who read this: if there is anyone who knows it better or more truly than me, let them speak; I would be very pleased.

May Allah grant you goodness and beauty!

This is where Ubykh comes to an end.

— Tevfik Esenç

Esenç died on the night of 7 October 1992, at the age of 88; he was buried in the village cemetery of Hacıosman, his birthplace, alongside his wife Emine. He was survived by three sons and two daughters.

In 1994, A. Sumru Özsoy organized the international Conference on Northwest Caucasian Linguistics at Boğaziçi University, in memory of Dumézil and Esenç.

== See also ==
- List of last known speakers of languages
