= List of institutions of the University of Cambridge =

The following institutions form part of the University of Cambridge.

== Main ==
- Six schools (composed of over 100 faculties and departments):
  - School of Arts and Humanities
  - School of the Biological Sciences
  - School of Clinical Medicine
  - School of the Humanities and Social Sciences
  - School of the Physical Sciences
  - School of Technology
- Thirty one constituent colleges.

== Other ==
- ADC Theatre
- Cambridge University Press and Assessment, formed from a merger of:
  - Cambridge Assessment (previously the University of Cambridge Local Examinations Syndicate)
  - Cambridge University Press
- Cambridge University Library
- University of Cambridge Professional and Continuing Education (previously the Institute of Continuing Education)
- Millennium Mathematics Project
- University of Cambridge Museums
  - Fitzwilliam Museum
    - Hamilton Kerr Institute
  - Kettle's Yard
  - Museum of Archaeaology and Anthropology
  - Museum of Classical Archaeology
  - Polar Museum
  - Sedgwick Museum of Earth Sciences
  - Museum of Zoology
  - Whipple Museum of the History of Science
- Cambridge University Boat Club
- Cambridge University Students' Union (CUSU)
- Cambridge Union

== University sites ==
- Cambridge Bio-Medical Campus
- Cambridge Science Park
- Downing Site
- New Museums Site
- Old Addenbrooke's Site
- Sidgwick Site
- West Cambridge

== Associated organisations and institutions ==
The following are organisations and institutions associated with but not part of the University of Cambridge.

- Cambridge Auto-ID Lab
- Cambridge Crystallographic Data Centre
- Cambridge Network — industry networking organisation
- Cambridge SCA
- Cambridge Theological Federation
- Cambridge University Air Squadron
- Cambridge University Constabulary
- Granta - literary magazine founded by Cambridge students
- The Naked Scientists – science radio show and podcasts created by Cambridge University scientists

== See also ==
- Divisions of the University of Oxford
