= Dads (band) =

American emo duo band

- Origin: Piscataway, New Jersey, U.S.
- Genres: Emo; indie rock; math rock; emo revival
- Years active: 2010–2015
- Labels: 6131 Records; Flannel Gurl; Stiff Slack; Get Into It; Beach; Day By Day; Broken World
- Past members: John Bradley; Scott Scharinger; Michael Nazzaro; Ryan Azada

Dads was an American emo band from Piscataway, New Jersey, composed of guitarist/vocalist Scott Scharinger and drummer/vocalist John Bradley. The band relocated to Ann Arbor, Michigan in 2014. In 2020, Vulture named their song "Shit Twins" as one of the 100 greatest emo songs of all time.

== History ==
=== Formation and American Radass ===
Dads formed in the summer of 2010 as a trio consisting of guitarist/vocalist Scott Scharinger, drummer/vocalist John Bradley, and bassist Michael Nazzaro, all from various parts of the Central New Jersey area. The band quickly gained the attention of the emo revival scene. Dads soon decided to part ways with Nazzaro as they found it easier to connect as a two-piece and released The Essential John Denver EP the same year. In 2011, the band recorded and released the EPs Brush Your Teeth ;) and Brush Your Teeth, Again ;) respectively, with the latter being a repress that also included three new songs as well as a re-recorded song. After developing an audience in the emo revival scene through extensive touring, the band released their debut LP, American Radass (This Is Important), in 2012. The release brought the band minor commercial success along with critical acclaim. Through further touring, the band built a national audience and released an EP in 2013 entitled Pretty Good via 6131 Records, which led to the band charting on various Billboard charts for the first time. The following year, the band released a Record Store Day exclusive EP entitled Woman, which included covers of the songs "Good Woman" by Cat Power and "I Never" by Rilo Kiley.

=== I'll Be the Tornado and breakup ===
Sometime in early 2014, Bradley and Scharinger decided to move the band to Ann Arbor, Michigan. In October 2014, Dads released their sophomore effort, I'll Be the Tornado which reached 17th on the Billboard Top Heatseekers album chart and received considerable critical praise. Around this time they added Ryan Azada to the band's lineup as a permanent bassist. However, months after the album's release, Dads dropped off multiple tours in summer 2015 as a result of a speculated breakup, which was confirmed by Scott Scharinger in a post on the band's Facebook page in the fall of 2016.

When asked about the breakup of Dads, Bradley stated that the band's breakup was a matter of their personal friendships. He said that the project became increasingly stressful as the band continued to grow and started opening for larger acts, and was concerned that the band would not look professional while still trying to "have fun" playing music. The vocalist commented, "everything just kind of came to a head, and we all decided to just go away, like, 'let’s just part and do our own thing.'"

=== Post-breakup ===
John Bradley was diagnosed with testicular cancer in 2016. He is currently in remission, and has since released new music as early as 2017.

== Discography ==
Studio albums

- American Radass (This Is Important) (2012)
- I'll Be the Tornado (2014)

Extended plays

- The Essential John Denver EP (2010)
- Brush Your Teeth ;) (2011)
- Brush Your Teeth, Again ;) (2011)
- Pretty Good (2013)
- Woman (2014)
