= John Colarusso =

Canadian linguist

- Born: 30 June 1945 (age 81)
- Occupation: Linguist

Academic work
- Institutions: McMaster University
- Main interests: Northwest Caucasian languages

John Colarusso is a linguist specializing in Caucasian languages. Since 1976, he has taught at McMaster University in Hamilton, Ontario.

Colarusso has published more than sixty-five articles on linguistics, myths, politics, and the Caucasus; he has also authored three books, edited one, and is finishing two further books.

Among other works, he has published grammar books of the Kabardian language.

== Selected publications ==
- John Colarusso (1992). A Grammar of the Kabardian Language. University of Calgary Press.
- Colarusso, John (1997). "Phyletic Links between Proto-Indo-European and Proto–Northwest Caucasian". The Journal of Indo-European Studies (Chicago Linguistic Society) 25 (1–2): 119–151.
- John Colarusso (2002). Myths from the Caucasus: the Nart Sagas of the Circassians, Abazas, Abkhaz, and Ubykhs. Princeton University Press.
- Colarusso, John (2003). "Further Etymologies between Indo-European and Northwest Caucasian". In Holisky, Dee Ann; Tuite, Kevin. Current Issues in Linguistic Theory. Amsterdam: John Benjamins Publishing Company. pp. 41–60. ISBN 978-1588114617.
- Colarusso, John (2014). The Northwest Caucasian Languages (RLE Linguistics F: World Linguistics): A Phonological Survey (Routledge Library Editions: Linguistics) Kindle Edition
- John Colarusso (2015). A North West Caucasian Linguistics Reader. LINCOM-Europa.
- John Colarusso; Tamirlan Salbiev (2016). Tales of the Narts: Ancient Myths and Legends of the Ossetians. Princeton University Press. ISBN 978-1-4008-8112-3.
