= Turkic Languages (journal) =

Biannual linguistic journal

- Discipline: Linguistics
- Language: English
- Edited by: Lars Johanson

Publication details
- History: 1997–present
- Publisher: Harrassowitz
- Frequency: Biannual

Standard abbreviations
- ISO 4: Turk. Lang.

Indexing
- ISSN: 1431-4983
- OCLC no.: 760059298

Links
- Journal homepage

Turkic Languages is a peer-reviewed biannual academic journal published by Harrassowitz. The journal covers research on all aspects of linguistics concerning Turkic languages.

== History and profile ==
Turkic Languages was launched in 1997. The journal is published biannually by Harrassowitz. Its publication is supported by Deutsche Forschungsgemeinschaft (DFG; "German Research Foundation" in English). The editor-in-chief of the journal is Lars Johanson, professor of Turcology at the University of Mainz.

The journal includes contributions on linguistic studies of Turkic languages. In addition, it also publishes review articles, reviews, discussions, reports, and news on recent publications in linguistics. The issues from 1997 to 2010 were digitized by DFG.
