= Dad, Wyoming =

Ghost town in Wyoming, United States

Coordinates: 41.3261°N 107.7584°W

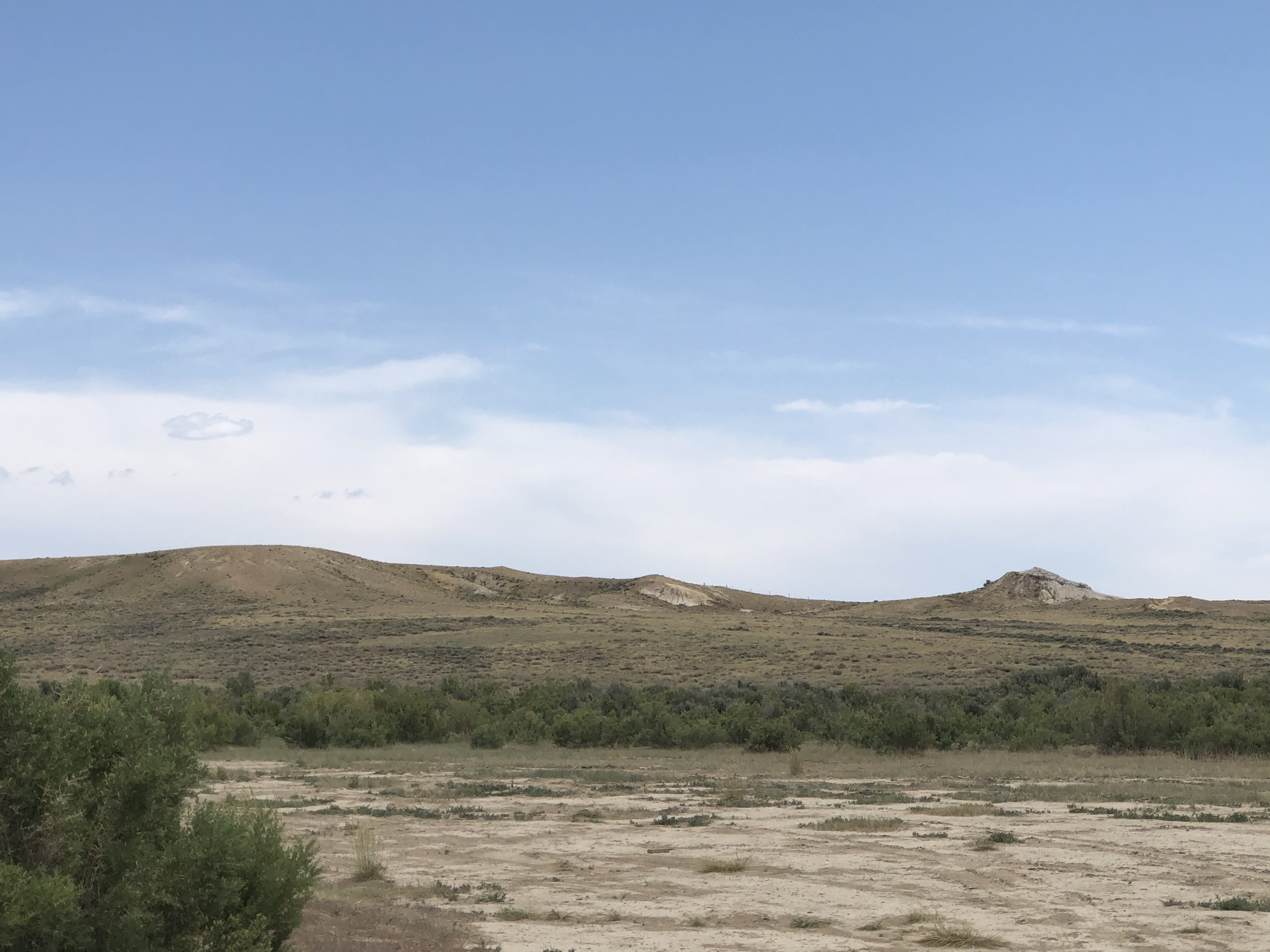
A flat patch of land on the area of Dad, Wyoming

Dad is an extinct town in Carbon County, Wyoming, United States.

A post office called Dad was established in 1910, and remained in operation until 1940. The origin of the name "Dad" is obscure. It is believed that it is named after A.T. Dad Corlett, a rancher who lived in the area.
