= Hacıosman, Manyas =

Village in Turkey

Hacıosman Lek'uaşüa
- Neighbourhood
- Location in Turkey Hacıosman (Marmara)
- Coordinates: 39.99228°N 27.81269°E
- Country: Turkey
- Province: Balıkesir
- District: Manyas
- Population (2022): 81
- Time zone: UTC+3 (TRT)

Hacıosman (Ubykh: Lek'uaşüa [lɜkʷʼɐ́ɕʷɜ]; Adyghe: Хунджахъабл, romanized: Hundjahabl) is a neighbourhood in the municipality and district of Manyas, Balıkesir Province in Turkey. Its population is 81 (2022).

Until 1992, it was one of the few villages in the world where the inhabitants spoke the Ubykh language in their daily lives. The last speaker of Ubykh, Tevfik Esenç, was born, and died, in this village.

Other villages where Ubykh was spoken included Kırkpınar and Hacıyakup.
