= Dad Mohammad Khan =

Afghan politician

Dado Mohammad Khan داد محمد خان

Afghanistan Parliament

Personal details
- Born: Afghanistan
- Died: March 19, 2009 Helmand province, Afghanistan
- Occupation: Politician

Dad Mohammad Khan, was locally known as Amir Dado, was a Member of Parliament in the National Assembly of Afghanistan representing the Helmand province. He was the former chief of intelligence for the Helmand province, and ran unsuccessfully as second vice-presidential running mate to Sayyed Abdul Hadi Dabir in the 2004 Afghan presidential election.

== Biography ==
Originally a wealthy fruit vendor from the Sangin, he became a Mujahideen commander during the Soviet–Afghan War. After the collapse of the pro-Soviet government in 1992, he became one of the most powerful warlords in Helmand province. He was alleged to have committed serious war crimes against Afghan civilians and to have run a repressive local regime, including bans on women leaving their homes and arbitrary death sentences handed out by his religious court, during the following civil war. He was eventually overthrown by the Taliban and fled to Pakistan.

After the United States invasion of Afghanistan in 2001, Dado returned to Afghanistan and was named chief of intelligence for the Helmand province under the new Islamic Republic of Afghanistan. Members of his immediate family also returned to positions of power within the province, including one of his brothers as governor of the Sangin district and another as Sangin chief of police. Further allegations of war crimes followed, including violent extortion of money from civilians and summary executions of suspected Taliban sympathisers. Despite civilian and United Nations efforts to have Dado removed from power, the United States military argued that his methods were "the time-tested solution for controlling rebellious Pashtuns."

In 2004, he ran unsuccessfully as second vice-presidential running mate to Sayyed Abdul Hadi Dabir in the 2004 Afghan presidential election.

Dad Mohammad was the target of several Taliban attacks as were members of his family.

Dad Mohammad Khan was killed in road bomb blast in the southern province of Helmand of Afghanistan on March 19, 2009.
