= Üçpınar =

Üçpınar can refer to:

- Üçpınar, Araç
- Üçpınar, Çüngüş
- Üçpınar, Keban
- Üçpınar, Lapseki
- Üçpınar, Polatlı
- Üçpınar, Tercan
