= Dilbilim Araştırmaları =

Linguistic journal in Turkey

- First volume of Dilbilim Araştırmaları
- Discipline: Linguistics
- Language: English, Turkish
- Edited by: Deniz Zeyrek

Publication details
- History: 1990-present
- Publisher: Boğaziçi University Press (Turkey)
- Frequency: Biannual

Standard abbreviations
- ISO 4: Dilbilim Araştırmaları

Indexing
- ISSN: 1300-8552
- LCCN: 92968471
- OCLC no.: 29482153

Links
- Journal homepage

Dilbilim Araştırmaları (DAD; English: Journal of Linguistic Research) is a peer-reviewed academic journal published by Boğaziçi University Press. The journal covers research on all aspects of linguistics concerning Turkish language.

== History and profile ==
Dilbilim Araştırmaları was established in 1990 by linguists in Turkey. The journal has been published by different publishing houses, including Hitit Publishing House and Bizim Büro Publishers. The current publisher is Boğaziçi University Press.

Until 2008 one volume was published each year. It has been published biannually, specifically in May and in September, since 2009. Both English and Turkish articles are published in the journal.

The founding editors-in-chief were Gül Durmuşoğlu, Kamile İmer, Ahmet Kocaman, and A. Sumru Özsoy. Durmuşoğlu served in the post from 1990 to 1993, İmer, Kocaman, and Özsoy from 1990 to 2011. The current editor of the journal has been Deniz Zeyrek, professor of linguistics at Middle East Technical University, since 2011.

The University of California digitized some issues of the journal.

== Abstracting and indexing ==
The journal is abstracted and indexed in TÜBİTAK-ULAKBİM SBVT, Linguistic Bibliography, MLA International Bibliography and Ulrich's Periodicals Directory.
