= Sadz =

Group of Abkhazians

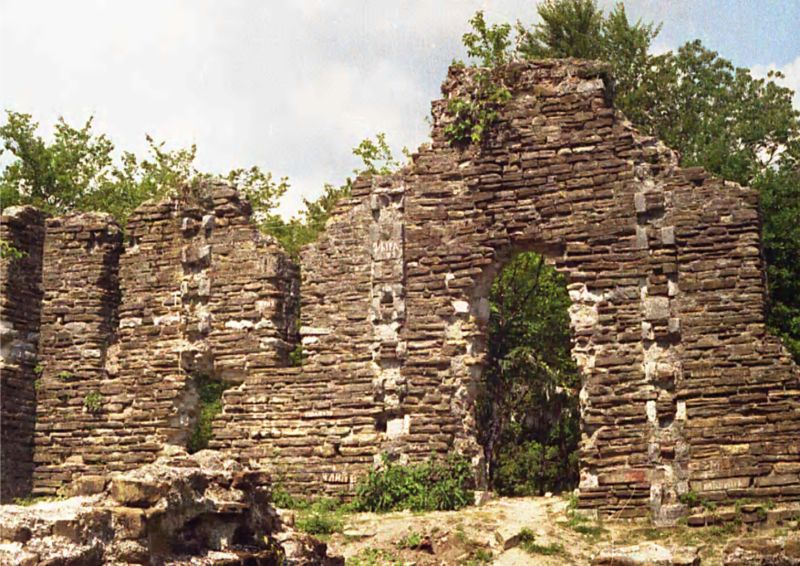
A ruined medieval Sadz church in modern-day Sochi

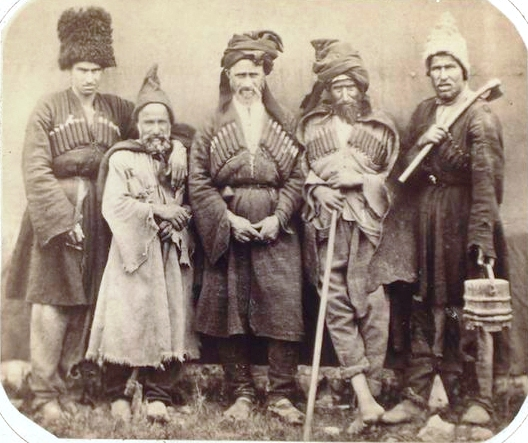
An 1865 photograph of Jigets

The Sadz or Asadzwa, also Jigets, are a subethnic group of the Abkhazians. The Sadzy tribe historically inhabited the territory between Gagra and Khosta, in a region traditionally referred to as Lesser Abkhazia (or Lesser Abasia).

== See also ==
- Peoples of the Caucasus
