= Hans Vogt (linguist) =

Norwegian linguist

Hans Kamstrup Vogt (1 June 1903 – 25 September 1986) was a Norwegian linguist who specialized in the Caucasian languages, especially Georgian. He also did significant early work on the Kalispel language and produced an interesting dictionary of the Ubykh language.

He was a member of the Norwegian Academy of Science and Letters since 1937, the Royal Danish Academy of Sciences and Letters from 1957 and of the Norwegian Academy for Language and Literature from 1971. He was an honorary member of the Linguistic Society of America, the Societas Caucasologica Europaea and the Georgian Academy of Languages. He held an honorary degree at the Tbilisi State University and won the Nansen Medal in 1967. He was decorated as a Commander of the Order of St. Olav (1966) and Chevalier of the Legion of Honour.

Politically he was a member of the organization Mot Dag from 1926 to 1936.

Academic offices
Preceded by Johan Tidemann Ruud	Rectors of the University of Oslo; 1964–1969	Succeeded by Johs. Andenæs
