= Aga =

Aga or AGA may refer to:

== Aviation ==
- IATA airport code for Agadir–Al Massira Airport in Souss-Massa Region, Morocco

== Business ==
- Abellio Greater Anglia, former train company in England
- AGA AB, Aktiebolaget Svenska Gasaccumulator, a Swedish company, the originator of the AGA cooker
- AGA (automobile), Aktiengesellschaft für Automobilbau, 1920s German car company
- AGA Rangemaster Group, British manufacturer
  - AGA cooker, an oven and cooker
- Architectural Glass and Aluminum, a glazing contractor, established in 1970

== Groups ==
- American Gaming Association
- American Gas Association
- American Gastroenterological Association
- American Go Association, organization to promote the board game of Go
- American Grandprix Association
- Assemblies of God in Australia, a Pentecostal denomination
- Association of Government Accountants, government accounting professional organization that issues the Certified Government Financial Manager
- Australian Go Association, governing body for the board game Go

== Medicine ==
- Androgenetic alopecia
- Anti-gliadin antibodies
- Appropriate for gestational age, referring to prenatal growth rate
- Aspartylglucosaminidase

== People ==
- Aga Khan (disambiguation)
- Ağa (Ottoman Empire), an Ottoman Turkish military and administrative rank
- Aga Radwańska, Polish tennis player
- AGA (singer), Hong Kong singer
- Aga vom Hagen (1872–1949), German painter, author, and art patron
- Alejandro G. Abadilla (1906–1969), Filipino poet

=== Given name ===
- Aga, a diminutive of the Russian female first name Agafa
- Aga, a diminutive of the Russian female first name Agapa
- Aga, a diminutive of the Russian female first name Agapiya
- Aga, a diminutive of the Russian female first name Agata (a variant of Agatha)
- Aga, a diminutive of the Russian female first name Avgusta
- Aga, a diminutive of the Russian male first name Agafangel
- Aga, a diminutive of the Russian male first name Agafon
- Aga, a diminutive of the Russian male first name Agafonik
- Aga, a diminutive of the Russian male first name Agap
- Aga, a diminutive of the Russian male first name Agapit
- Aga, a diminutive of the Russian male first name Agav
- Aga, a diminutive of the Russian male first name Agavva
- Ağa Aşurov (1880–1936), Azerbaijani statesman
- Aga Muhlach (born 1969), Filipino actor and producer
- Aga of Kish, Ensi of Kish and King of Sumer
- Aga Zaryan (born 1976), Polish vocalist

=== Surname ===
- Ağa, a Turkish surname
- Alemu Aga (born 1950), Ethiopian musician
- Anu Aga (born 1942), Indian businesswoman
- Maria-Laura Aga (born 1994), Belgian footballer
- Patrick Aga, Nigerian politician
- Ragheb Aga (born 1984), Kenyan cricketer
- Selim Aga (c. 1826 – 1875), Sudanese writer

== Places ==
- Aga, Egypt
- Aga, Niigata, Japan
- Aga Point, Guam
- Aga (river), a tributary of the Onon in Zabaykalsky Krai, Russia
- Brestovăț, Timiș County, Romania, called Aga in Hungarian
- Monte Aga, mountain in Italy

== Other ==
- AGA, a codon for the amino acid arginine
- Aga (bird), Chamorro language name of Corvus kubaryi, the Mariana crow
- Aga (bug), a genus of assassin bugs in the tribe Harpactorini
- Ága (film), a 2018 Bulgarian film
- Aga saga
- Aguano language
- Alcohol and Gaming Authority, government body in Nova Scotia, Canada
- Alte Gesamt-Ausgabe, 19th century publication of compositions by Franz Schubert
- Amiga Advanced Graphics Architecture, a Commodore Amiga graphics chipset
- Art Gallery of Alberta, an art museum in Edmonton, Alberta, Canada

== See also ==
- Agga (disambiguation)
- Aegea
- Agha (disambiguation)
