= Agasha =

Agasha may refer to:

- Agasha Temple of Wisdom, a US spiritualist group
- Juliet Bashiisha Agasha, a Ugandan politician
- Agasha, a diminutive of the Russian male first name Agafon
- Agasha, a diminutive of the Russian male first name Agap
- Agasha, a diminutive of the Russian female first name Agapiya
- Agasha, a diminutive of the Russian male first name Agav
- Agasha, a diminutive of the Russian male first name Agavva
