= Fire of Manisa =

1922 burning of Manisa, Turkey

- Part of Greek retreat during the Greco-Turkish War (1919–1922)
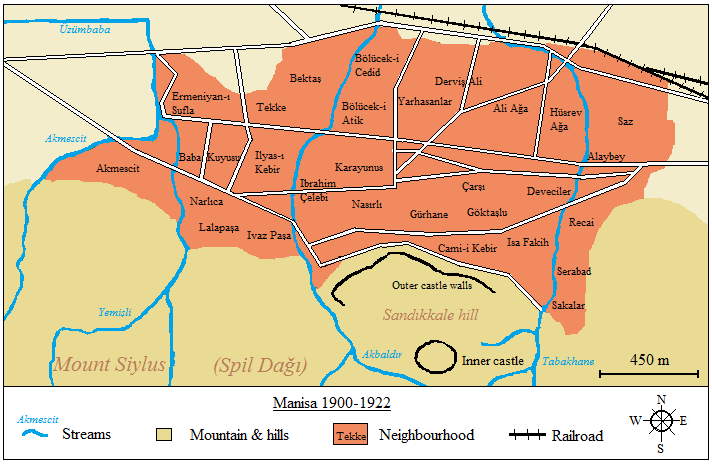
- Map of the town and its neighborhoods before the fire.
- Date: 5–8 September 1922
- Location: Manisa, Greek Zone of Smyrna (now Republic of Turkey)
- Participants: Hellenic Army, with Greek and Armenian irregulars (per Turkish sources); Çerkes Ethem and Kuva-yi Seyyare remnants
- Outcome: Destruction of 90% of the town (~10,000 buildings)
- Deaths: See § Victims

The Fire of Manisa (Turkish: Manisa yangını) refers to the burning of the city of Manisa, present-day Turkey, which started on the night of Tuesday, 5 September 1922 and continued until 8 September. The fire was ignited by parts of the retreating Hellenic Army during the Greco-Turkish War of 1919-1922, and as a result 90 percent of the buildings in the town were destroyed.

== Background ==
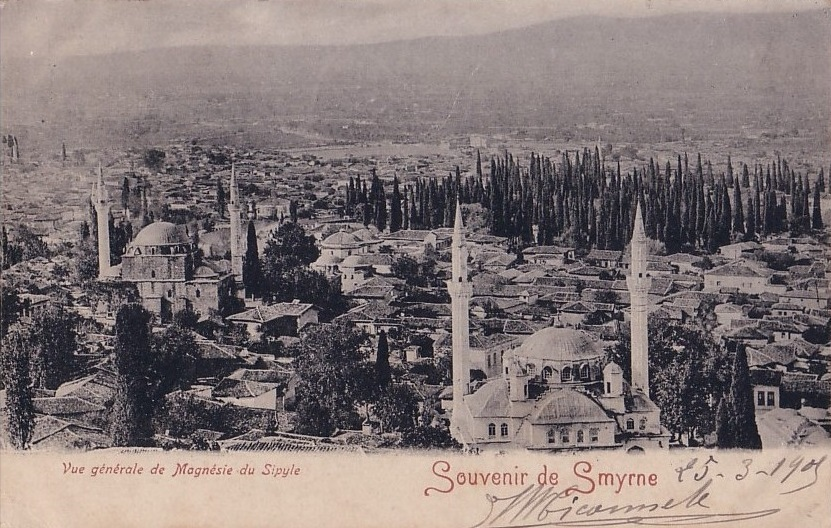
A view of Manisa before the fire. Photograph taken from the south in northerly direction and showing the area around the Cami-i Kebir neighborhood with the Sultan and Muradiye imperial Ottoman mosques in front. A small area around these mosques were saved from the fire.

Manisa is a historic town in Western Anatolia beneath the north side of Mount Sipylus that became part of the Ottoman Empire in the 15th century. During Ottoman rule, the town was governed by several princes (called Şehzade) and so is also known as a "town of the princes" (Şehzadeler şehri). Many examples of Ottoman architecture were built over the next few centuries, such as the Muradiye Mosque, designed by the famous architect Mimar Sinan in 1586, and built for Murad III who was a governor of the town.

By the 19th century, Manisa was among the largest towns in the Aegean region of Anatolia, and its population before the fire is estimated to have been between 35,000 and 50,000. Manisa had a religiously and ethnically diverse population made up of Muslims, Christians and Jews but Turkish Muslims were the largest group. During the 19th century, there was an increase in other groups, most notably Greeks. In 1865 the population was estimated by the British at 40,000 with minorities of 5,000 Greeks, 2,000 Armenians and 2,000 Jews. In 1898 the population was estimated by the Ottoman linguist Sami Bey at 36,252 of which 21,000 were Muslims, 10,400 Greeks, and 2,000 Armenians.

After World War I, Greece, supported by the Allied Powers, decided that the area known as the "Smyrna territory" would be occupied and could later be incorporated into Greece. In accordance with this plan, Greek forces (with Allied support) landed in Smyrna on 15 May 1919 and the town was occupied on 26 May without armed opposition. (Note: Some local Turks collaborated with the Greeks authorities such as the sub-governor Giritli Hüsnü who fled with the Greeks before the fire.) During the Greek Occupation, which lasted more than three years, there were alleged complaints by the local Turks of alleged bad treatment. (Note: According to Turkish sources, the town could only be left with soldier's permission, occasional murders, rapes, theft, looting and desecration of Muslim mosques and Muslim graveyards by the Greeks. Some Turkish villages around the town had been burned (On 25 June 1919, Cin Obası village was burned and the men killed ) or looted (24–25 July 1919, Develi, Koldere, Mütevelli, Kumkuyucak, Çerkesyenice. In January 1920, Keçili). These claims were not independently verified.) Nevertheless, official Greek policy was to punish perpetrators of crimes and the occupation before the Greek retreat generally went well. In an incident, the Greek Orthodox archbishop's representative in Manisa apologized to the mutasarrıf of the city on behalf of the Greek community for the insulting treatment of him by a Greek officer.

== Fire ==
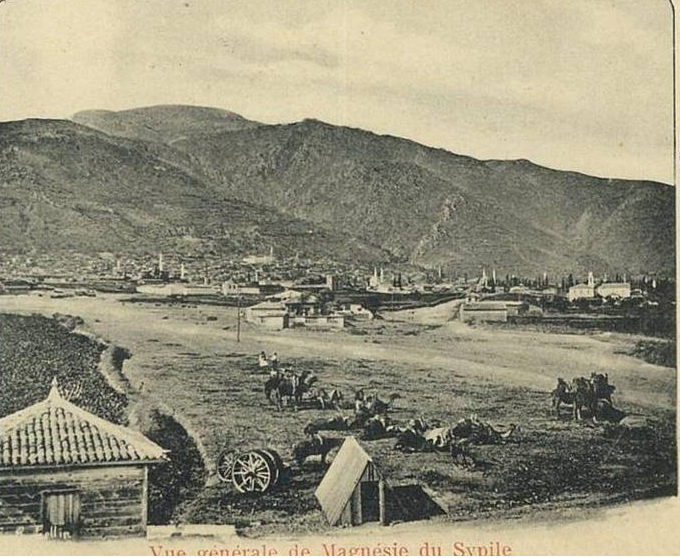
A general view of the town with Mount Sipylus.

A Turkish offensive started in August 1922 and the Greek army retreated towards Smyrna and the Aegean coast. During their retreat they carried out a scorched earth policy, burning towns and villages and committing atrocities along the way. Towns to the east of Manisa, such as Alaşehir and Salihli, were burned. Several days before the actual fire in Manisa, rumours had started that the town would be burned. A Turkish source claims that the Greek army had permitted the Greek and Armenian population to leave and that they had already evacuated the area, while the same source claims that the local Turks and Muslims were ordered to stay in their houses. However, another Turkish source writes how a significant part of the people actually left and took shelter somewhere else, watching the fire from there. This is also corroborated by Turkish eyewitnesses which stated: "As Manisa was torched by the Greeks, the townspeople fled to the hills".

According to Turkish sources, fires were started at multiple places by specially organized groups. According to Turkish Lieutenant Colonel "Cassim Pacha":

The main Greek Army did not pass through the city but around it. The damage was done by this organized band who seemed to have no other duties, and it was claimed that the work was carried out under the personal supervision of Col. Turner Poweljn [sic] and his chief of staff, Phillips.

Other Turkish sources call them colonel "Bagorçi" or "Yagorçi" and lieutenant colonel "Filipos". According to the same Turkish sources, a significant number of the arsonists were "local Greeks and Armenians", especially Armenian refugees from Cilicia who were very hostile to the Turks.

Çerkes Ethem and his Circassian Kuva-yi Seyyare were also alleged to have participated in igniting and spreading the fire, while looting and committing various atrocities against Turks.

During the night of Tuesday 5 September and the morning of 6 September, fires were started in the commercial Çarşı district (while looted was taking place) and at various other sites. Many people left their houses and fled to safety in the mountains and hills. During this chaos some people were killed by the Greeks or burnt to death. The population hid in the mountains for several days. Meanwhile, the Turkish army continued its rapid advance and, after some fighting with remaining Greek troops, they took control of the remains of the town on 8 September. By then most of the town had been destroyed.

Gülfem Kaatçılar İren, witnessed the fire as a little girl and remembers when she fled to the hills with her family:

After escaping the militia towards dawn, we climbed up a dry stream bed to hide in the hills. As we climbed, the city was burning, and we were lit by its light and warmed by its heat. It burned for three days and three nights. I saw the windowpanes of houses explode like bombs. Sacks of grapes stuck together, bubbling like jam. Dead cows and horses, balloons with their legs in the air. Ancient trees keeled over, their roots burning like logs. I did not forget these things. The heat, the hunger, the fear, the smell. After three days we saw the dust rise in the valley below. Turkish soldiers on horseback; we thought they were Greeks come to kill us in the hills. I remember three soldiers carrying green and red flags. People kissed the hooves of their horses, crying "Our saviors have come."

This witness testimony is also verified with the testimony of General Fahrettin Altay, the commander of the 5th Cavalry Army Corps, the Army Corps to save the remaining buildings and people of Manisa from fire on 8 September:

On the night of SEPTEMBER 7, we saw from afar with sadness that MANISA was burned and when we arrived there on September 8th, the people of Manisa, who fled from the fire to the mountains, came down from the mountains in heaps and began to hug us among the ashes. All possible help was given to the people of Manisa and the GOVERNMENT was ESTABLISHED. I gave the order to "ADVANCE TO IZMIR WITH HASTE the next morning".

== Aftermath ==
The town is believed to have lost many buildings and objects of historical significance, but a small area around the two imperial Ottoman mosques was saved from destruction.

=== Damage ===
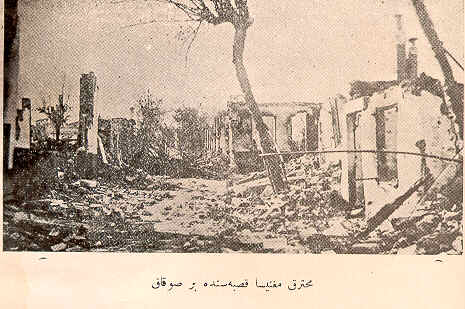
A picture of a street after the fire.

The Turkish government set up a commission called Tetkik-i Mezalim or Tetkik-i Fecayi Heyeti "the atrocity committee" to research and document the events and atrocities. The Turkish author Halide Edip saw the town after the fire, as did Henry Franklin-Bouillon, the French government representative, who declared that out of 11,000 houses in the city of Magnesia (Manisa) only 1,000 remained. Patrick Kinross wrote, "Out of the eighteen thousand buildings in the historic holy city of Manisa, only five hundred remained." The total economic damage was estimated to be more than fifty million lira (in contemporary value). Some of the captured Greek soldiers were employed in the reconstruction, such as in the rebuilding of the destroyed Karaköy mosque. During the Lausanne negotiations the Turkish delegation stated that 9,084 buildings in the Sanjak of Manisa, outside the city, town centres were burned by the Greek Army. More than 92% of all buildings in the centre of Manisa were destroyed - 13,638 out of 14,773 buildings.

Loder Park, who toured much of the devastated area immediately after the Greek evacuation, described the situation he had seen as follows:

Manisa ... almost completely wiped out by fire ... 10,300 houses, 15 mosques, 2 baths, 2,278 shops, 19 hotels, 26 villas ... [destroyed]..."
"1. The destruction of the interior cities visited by our party was carried out by Greeks."

"3. The burning of these cities was not desultory, nor intermittent, nor accidental, but well planned and thoroughly organized."

"4. There were many instances of physical violence, most of which was deliberate and wanton. Without complete figures, which were impossible to obtain, it may safely be surmised that 'atrocities' committed by retiring Greeks numbered well into thousands in the four cities under consideration. These consisted of all three of the usual type of such atrocities, namely murder, torture and rape."

=== Victims ===
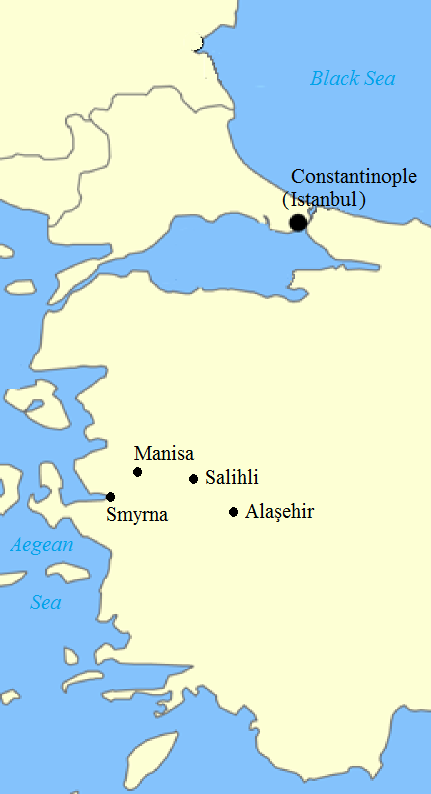
Map of western Anatolia and location of Manisa and other towns.

The total number of victims during the fire is not known, with Turkish government sources from the period claiming either 2,000, 3,500, 3,766 and 4,355 deaths. Turkish sources also variously state that either 300 cases of rape were recorded, 180 or 59.

The United States Office of Naval Intelligence was invited by the Turkish government to "tour" Manisa and verify the atrocities, but actually concluded that, outside the city's burning, no atrocities could be verified.

==== Veracity of allegations ====
Benny Morris and Dror Ze’evi note that the veracity of Turkish allegations against Greeks was questionable and that Western diplomats came to regard most Turkish charges as fraudulent, giving the events in Manisa as an example.

Colonel Stylianos Gonatas in his memoirs wrote that, when he and his men arrived in the city, it was already burning with many of the Turks shooting at Greek soldiers inside the houses, like in Kasaba. This is corroborated in the memoirs of soldier Vasilis Diamantopoulos, who writes that Kasaba caught fire after fighting with Turkish irregulars.

After the Turkish regular soldiers reached Manisa, Greek sources report that the Greek inhabitants of the city were massacred, while, according to eyewitness Elias Venezis, the surviving ones were sent to labour battalions, where they died.

The United States Office of Naval Intelligence was invited by the Turkish government to "tour" the region and verify the atrocities. The author of the report wrote:

The whole thing was evidently a propaganda trip, well laid out and all of the actors coached in their various parts. We were to see nothing except what they wished to show us and were to hear lots of wild tales without any material evidence being shown us. Believing that to be the case, we just settled back and decided to let them go to it and then we would write as we felt.

At the next stop, in Kasaba, the report writes: "We heard the same story of rape and loot, murder and wanton destruction, but still we were skeptical", adding that "We were still looking for concrete evidence and were not finding it". The author of the report only accepted "some evidences of atrocities" in Salihli, close to Manisa. He also stated that there were no corpses in Alaşehir.

=== In Turkish literature ===
The event is mentioned in a work by Turkish journalist Falih Rıfkı Atay. The Turkish poet İlhan Berk was a small child living in the Deveciler neighborhood at the time of the fire and fled to the mountains with his family. His older sister, who was "mentally ill", refused to leave with them and, when the fire engulfed her house, her hair caught fire and she burned to death. He wrote that he could never forget the flight to the mountains and wrote of other childhood memories of the events in his work Uzun Bir Adam. The historian Kamil Su also witnessed the fire as a 13-year-old living in the Alaybey neighborhood. On the morning of 6 September he fled with his family to the mountains. When he returned to his neighborhood he allegedly found corpses in the streets and most buildings razed to their foundations, only the walls of the historic Aydın mosque still standing; the corpse of an unknown man lay in the street in front of where Su's house had stood. He later wrote Manisa ve Yöresinde İşgal Acıları, a book about the Greek occupation and the fire. Gülfem gives a similar account, but does not mention seeing corpses of people.

== Gallery ==
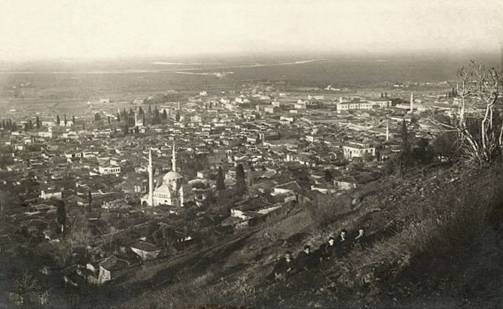
A view from the hills above the town.

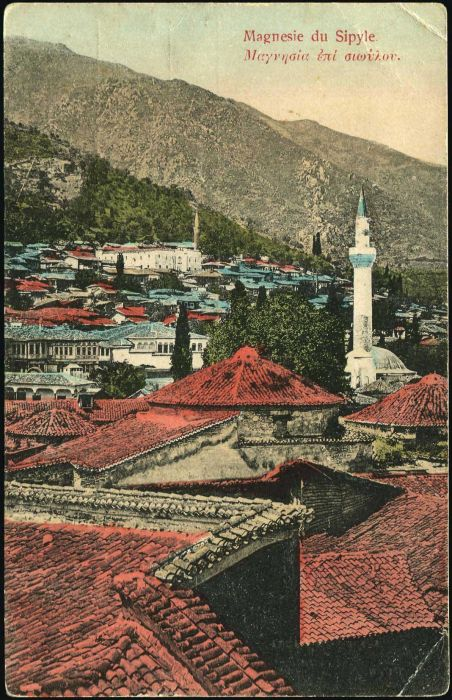
Picture taken from the north in southerly direction, showing Mount Sipylus and in the distance the Ulu Camii, grand mosque, built in 1366.

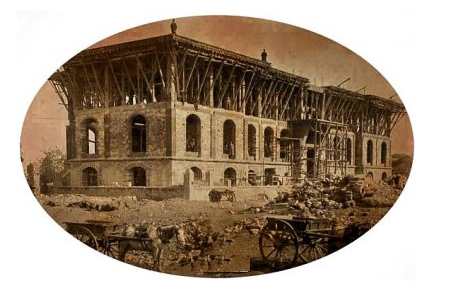
The reconstruction of the burned Municipal building.

== See also ==
- Fire of Smyrna (occurred a short time after Manisa on 13 September 1922)
- Outline and timeline of the Greek genocide
- List of massacres in Turkey

== Bibliography ==
- Fisher, Sydney Nettleton (1969), The Middle East: a History, New York: Alfred A Knopf
- Kinross, Lord (1960). Atatürk: The Rebirth of a Nation. Weidenfeld & Nicolson. ISBN 978-0-297-82036-9.
