= Agakha =

Agakha may refer to:

- Agakha, a diminutive of the Russian male first name Agav
- Agakha, a diminutive of the Russian male first name Agavva
