= Saint Nicholas Church, Dnipro =

Eastern Orthodox church in Dnipro, Ukraine

Saint Nicholas Church
- Свято-Миколаївський храм
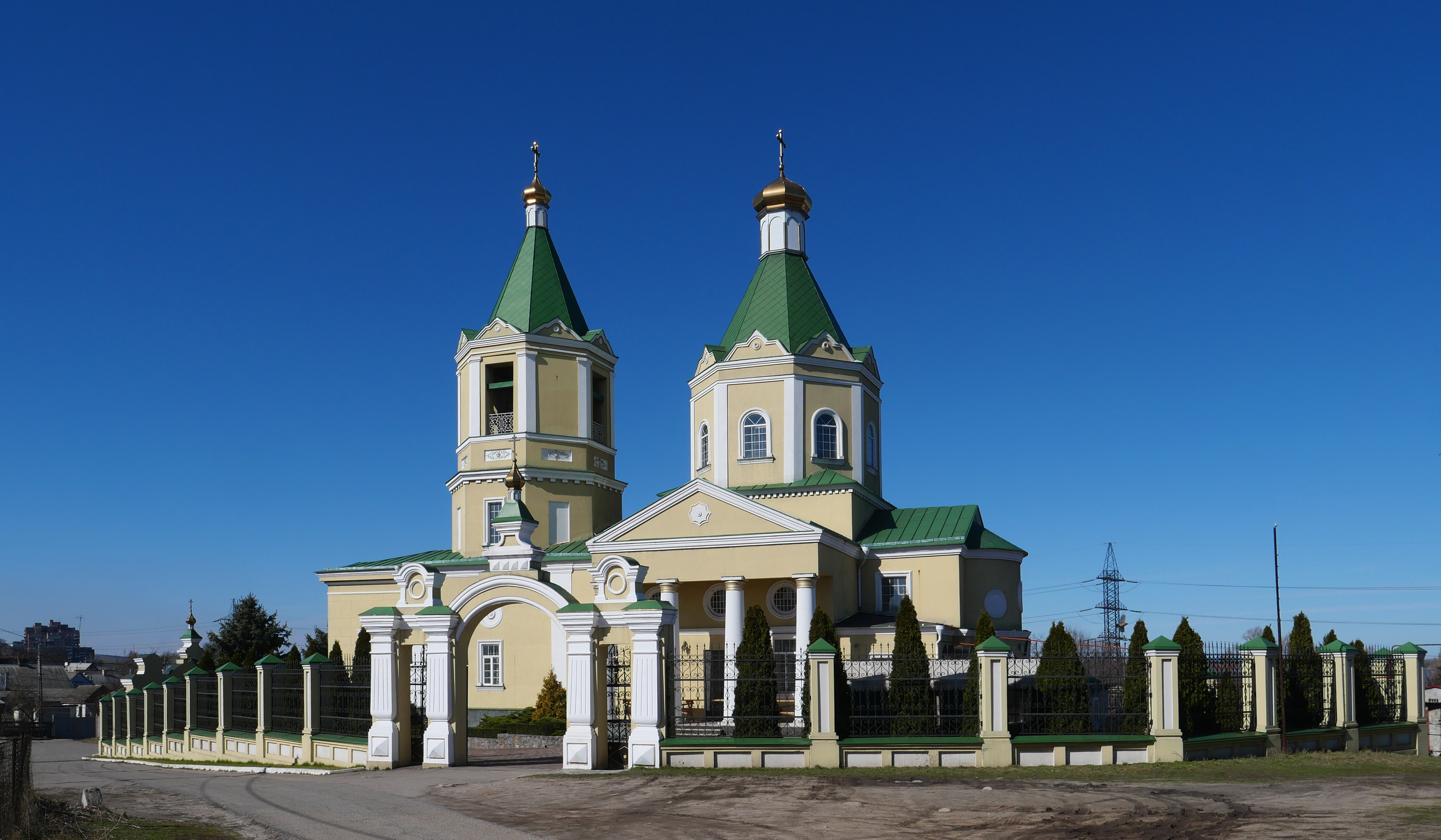
- The church in 2023
- Saint Nicholas Church
- 48°29′23″N 34°57′06″E
- Location: Dnipro
- Address: 108 Fortechna Street
- Country: Ukraine
- Denomination: Eastern Orthodoxy

History
- Status: Active
- Founded: 1640
- Dedication: Saint Nicholas
- Consecrated: 1807

Architecture
- Functional status: Cathedral and monument
- Architectural type: Classicism
- Years built: 1807–1810
- Completed: 1810

Administration
- Archdiocese: Ukrainian Orthodox Church

Immovable Monument of National Significance of Ukraine
- Official name: Миколаївська церква в Кодаках (Saint Nicholas Church in Kodaky)
- Type: Architecture
- Reference no.: 040042

The Saint Nicholas Church (Ukrainian: Свято-Миколаївський храм, romanized: Sviato-Mykolaivskyi khram) is a 19th-century Eastern Orthodoxy cathedral of the Ukrainian Orthodox Church (UOC) and national monument in Dnipro, Ukraine. Additionally, it is the oldest church in Dnipro and situated on land that was formerly Novi Kodaky.

== Design ==
The wooden church, which had stood since 1650, was replaced with the classicism-style stone church. The structure is made of stone and has a cross plan with a semicircular apse and a substantially extended western section with square additions. Doric porticos with four columns adorn the northern and southern facades, while a two-column portico highlights the main entry on the western face. The layout shows a two-tiered, octagonal structure above the western porch. It is completed by a rectangular bell tower and sits over the middle portion of the octagonal dome, which is topped with an onion-shaped top.

The church was renovated in 2006. The two baths with roofs had their shapes changed during the so-called reconstruction, and the only forged metal crosses that still stood in the Dnipropetrovsk Oblast were taken down. These crosses were examples of late 18th- and early 19th-century Ukrainian stained glass art. During the renovations of the church, these crosses were moved from the old wooden church to the newly constructed stone one. The preserved paintings from the early 1900s still sit inside the church.

== History ==
In the settlement of Novi Kodaky, there has been a church from at least from 1640 to 1650. The little wooden chapel was covered with reeds and straw. According to Bishop Theodosius's writings, lyakhov was destroyed when Zaporozhians and Tatars burnt down the city and the church in 1650. This suggests that the church is most likely Catholic. The town was reconstructed and the church, now Orthodox, was rebuilt by the Zaporozhians in 1650.

The wooden Saint Nicholas Church was already referred to as cathedral in 1750. Regretfully, there is currently no information available on the architecture of this building; all that is known about it is that the image of the Mother of God, which was carried there by an unidentified individual, initially appeared there. The image was allegedly already present in the church entryway in 1736, according to Semen Bardadym, the founder of the Novonikolayevsky Church. The picture was discovered a second time after the old church burnt down and was taken to a newly constructed wooden church, where it was initially placed in the sacristy and then transferred to the altar.

The actual date of construction of the new wooden church is yet unknown. It is without dispute that it was constructed following the previous church's fire in 1736 and before to the erection of the new building. The parish church took two or three building seasons to complete. It is known that the new church had five priests in 1770 and seven two years later. The throne was reconstructed and the altar vestibule's foundations were refurbished when the temple underwent renovations in 1780.

The wooden St. Nicholas Church needed restoration and was in total disrepair by 1800. The uppermost portion and half of the structure were demolished. The decision was made to stop using wood. However, since building wooden temples was already tightly forbidden by government decree during this time, a prohibition on new materials was also established. Following much thought, discussion, and hesitation, the Novi Kodaky community decided that a new church, made of stone.

It was decided in 1801, instead of building a wooden church, to build a stone one with the consent and blessing of Athanasius (Ivanov), the archbishop of Novorossiysk and Dnieper. A charter was issued on 25 August 1804, for the reconstruction of the church. On 23 June 1807, Ekaterinoslav Governorate priest Archpriest John Stanislavsky dedicated the area under the church, set the cornerstone for its building, and placed a cross on the location of the construction. The church's construction was finished in 1810.

The church was closed and converted into an ammo depot in 1933, according to the available archival data. The old picture of the Mother of God, was housed there before the church was closed. The church was opened in 1943 and remained open during the Nazi occupation. Although there were smashed windows and shards of shell and bomb debris all over the walls, the monument itself was unharmed. It is believed that an altar dedicated to Saint Seraphim of Sarov was previously consecrated during the post-war era. In the 1960s, the church's status was reinstated.

The church's parish life greatly improved when Archpriest Serhiy Kapov was named abbot on 8 October 1993, by proclamation of Bishop Agafangel. It has undergone additional renovations over the next ten years, including the construction of a two-story addition and a baptism room. The church opened a parish school with a three-year curriculum in January 2004.

Mitroforny Archpriest Serhiy Kapov (died 8 January 2004), the temple's permanent abbot, was buried on the church grounds. The chapel was dedicated and ceremoniously inaugurated on 5 January 2010, the anniversary day, in honor of Reverend Seraphim. In the co-service of the temple and municipal clergy, Metropolitan Iriney officiated over the grand consecration ceremony.

== Gallery ==
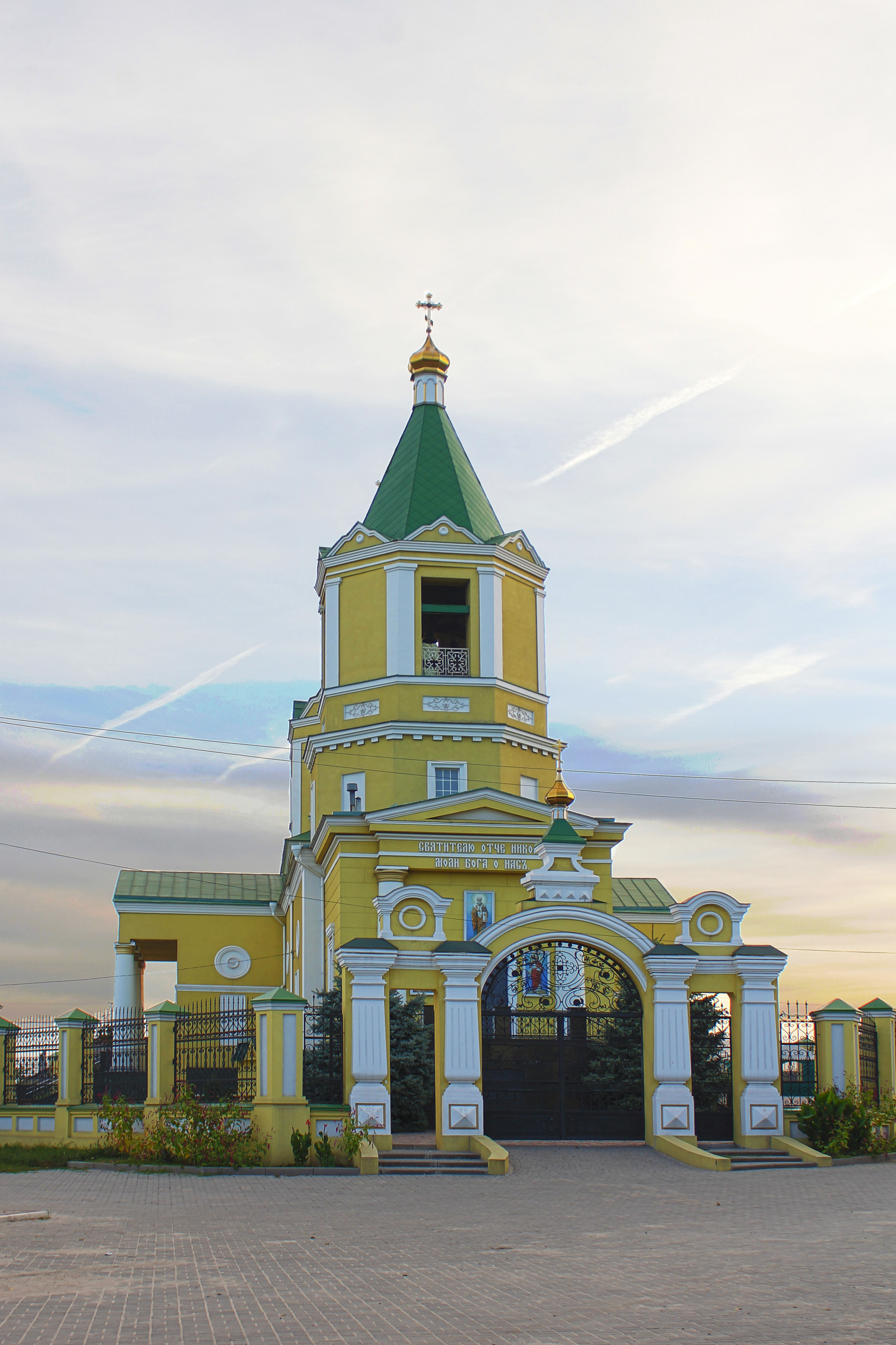
The church in 2012

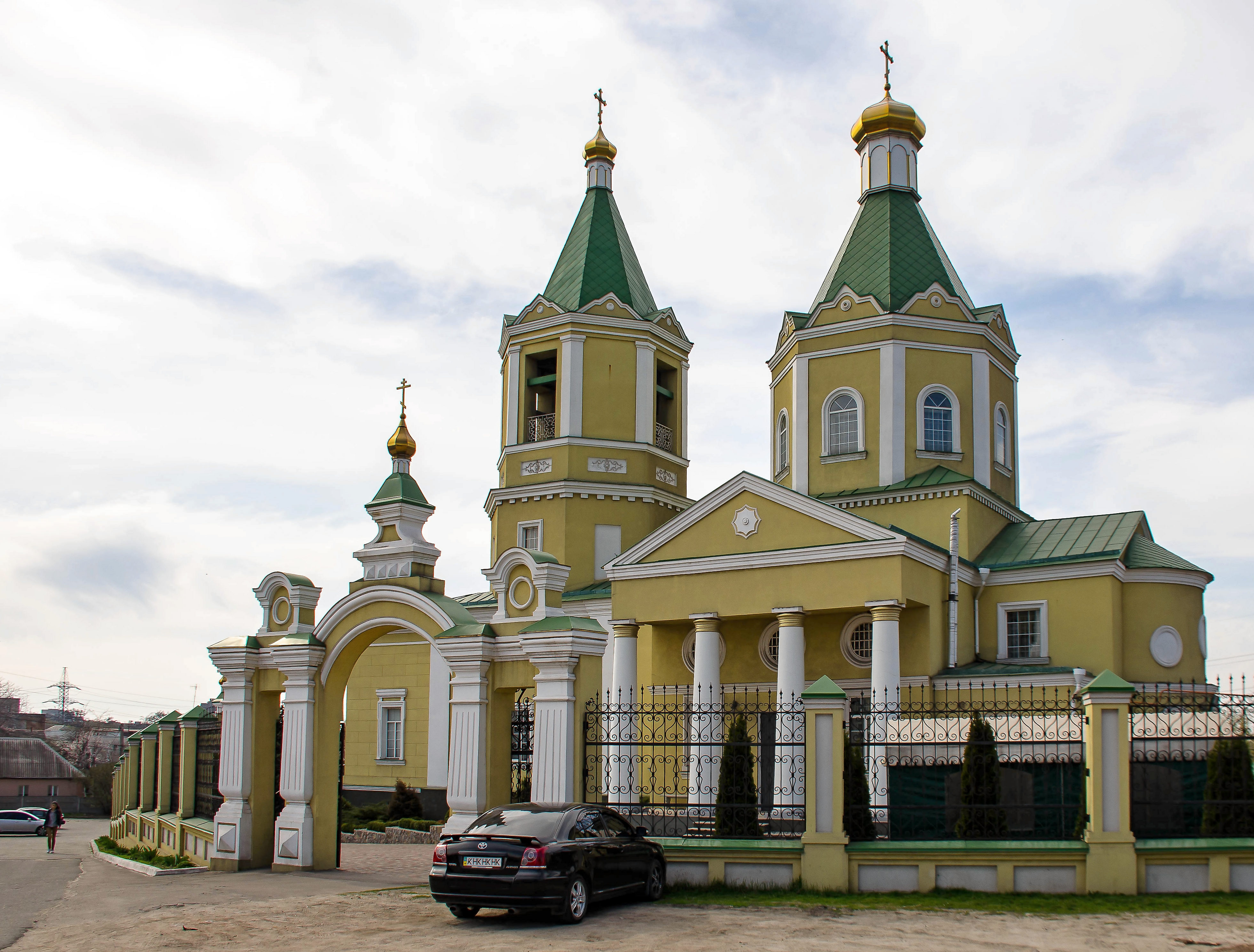
The church's main entrance in 2017

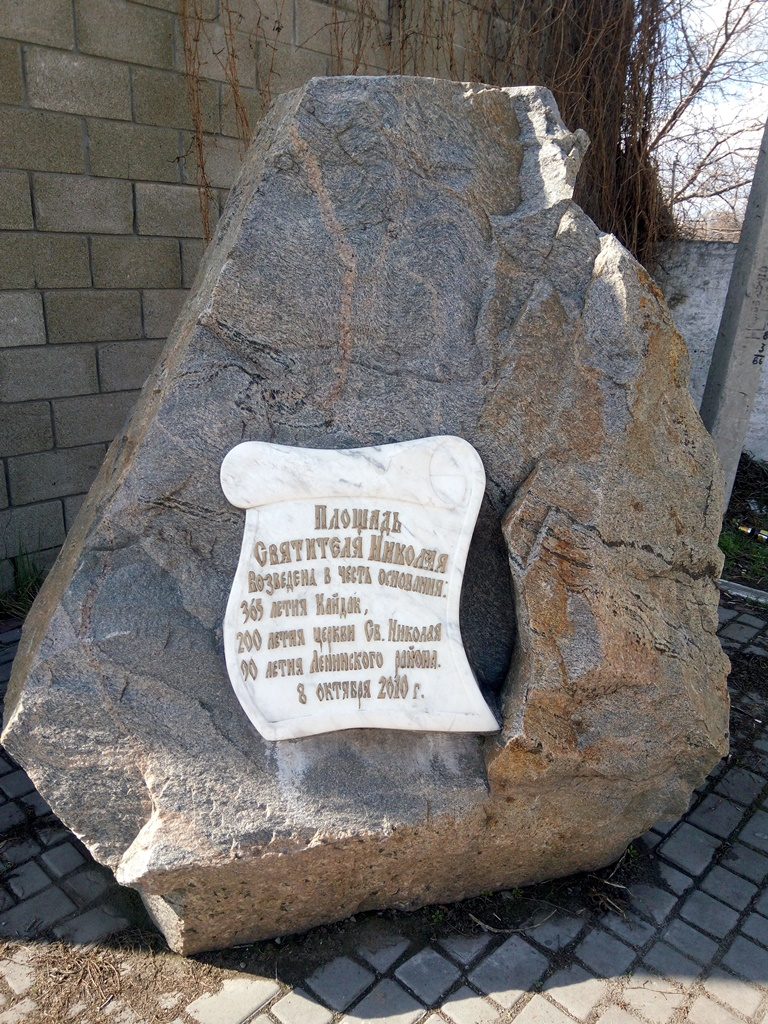
The 200th anniversary of the foundation of the church in 2020

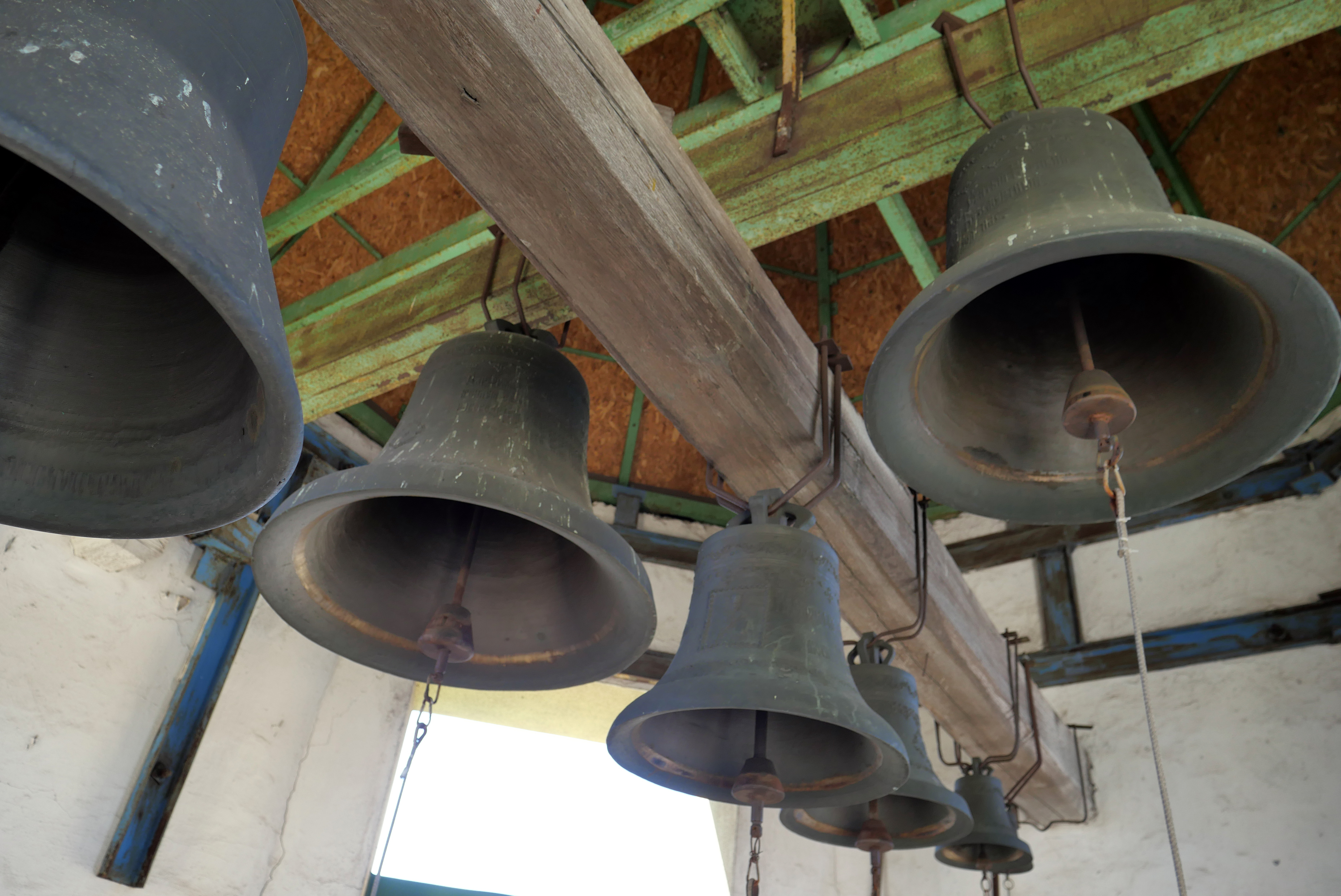
Bells at the top of the bell tower in 2023

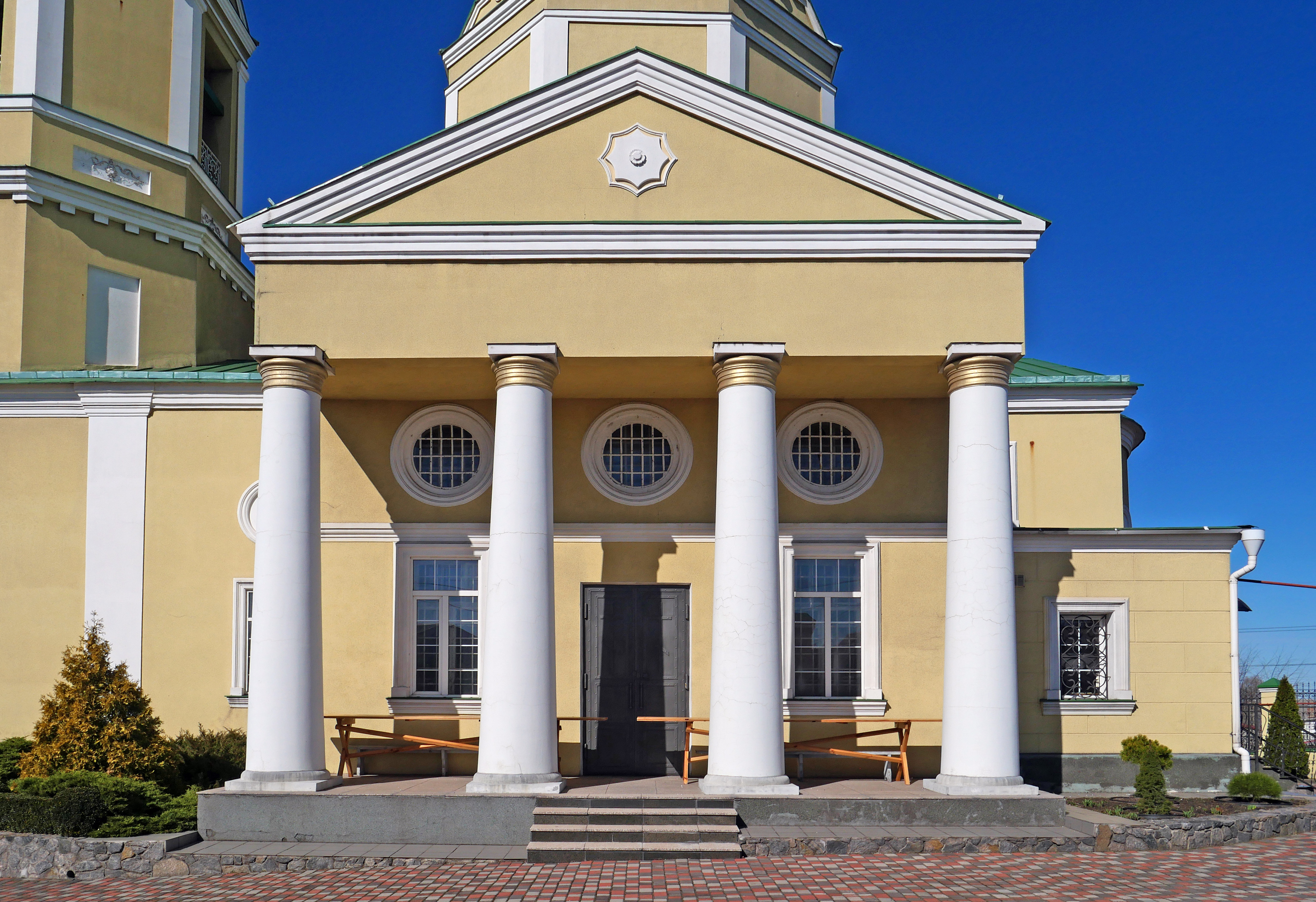
The church's porticos in 2023

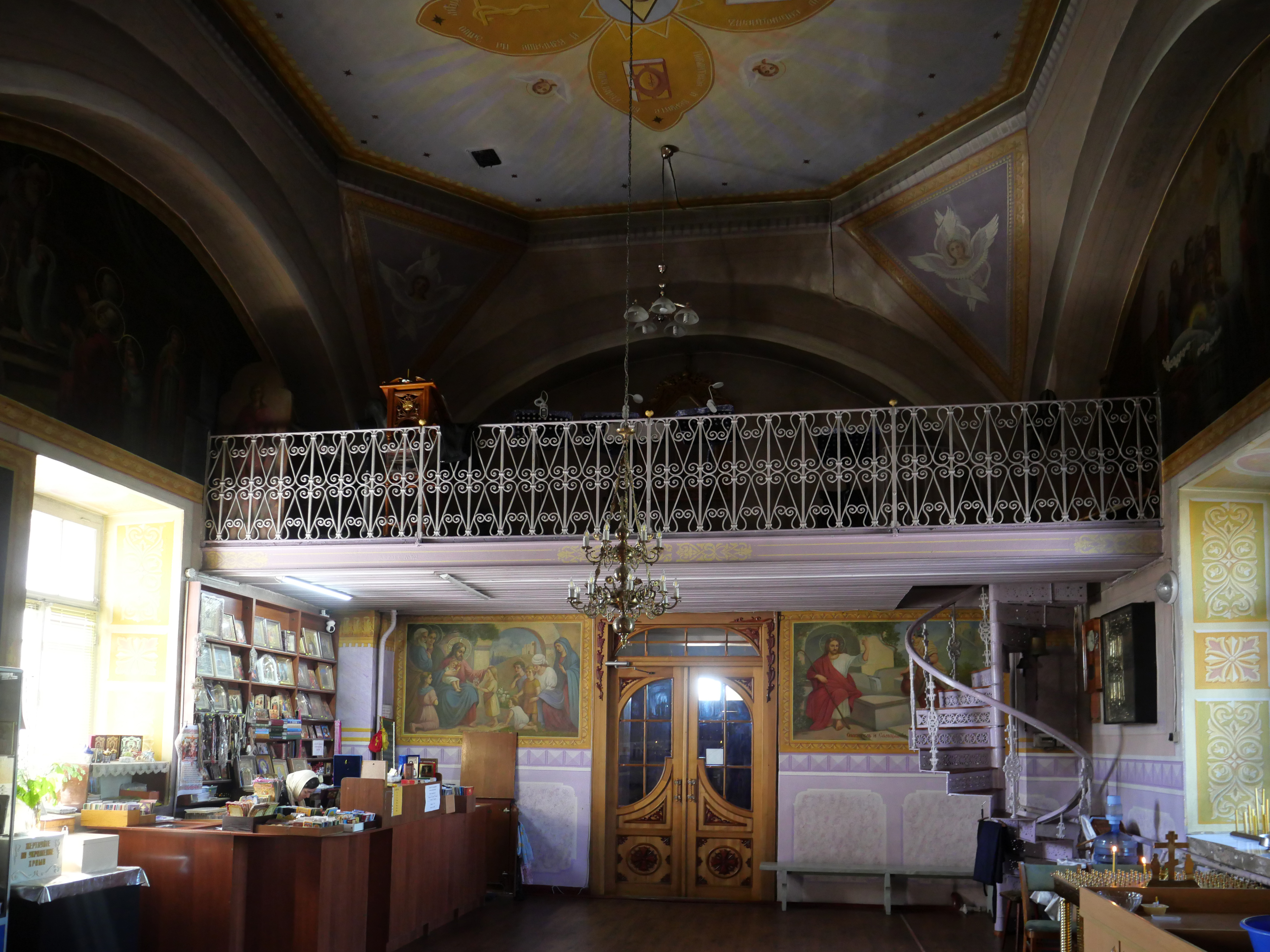
The church's interior in 2023
