= Son =

Male offspring

A son is a male offspring; a boy or a man in relation to his parents. The female counterpart is a daughter. From a biological perspective, a son constitutes a first degree relative.

== Social issues ==
In pre-industrial societies and some current countries with agriculture-based economies, a higher value was, and still is, assigned to sons rather than daughters, giving males higher social status, because males could perform farming tasks more effectively.

In China, a one-child policy was in effect until 2015 in order to address rapid population growth. Official birth records showed a rise in the level of male births since the policy was brought into law. This was attributed to a number of factors, including the illegal practice of sex-selective abortion and widespread under-reporting of female births.

In patrilineal societies, sons will customarily inherit an estate before daughters.

In some cultures, the eldest son has special privileges. For example, in Biblical times, the first-born male was bequeathed the most goods from his father. Some Japanese social norms involving the eldest son are: "that parents are more likely to live with their eldest child if their eldest child is a son" and "that parents are most likely to live with their eldest son even if he is not the eldest child".

== Christian symbolism ==
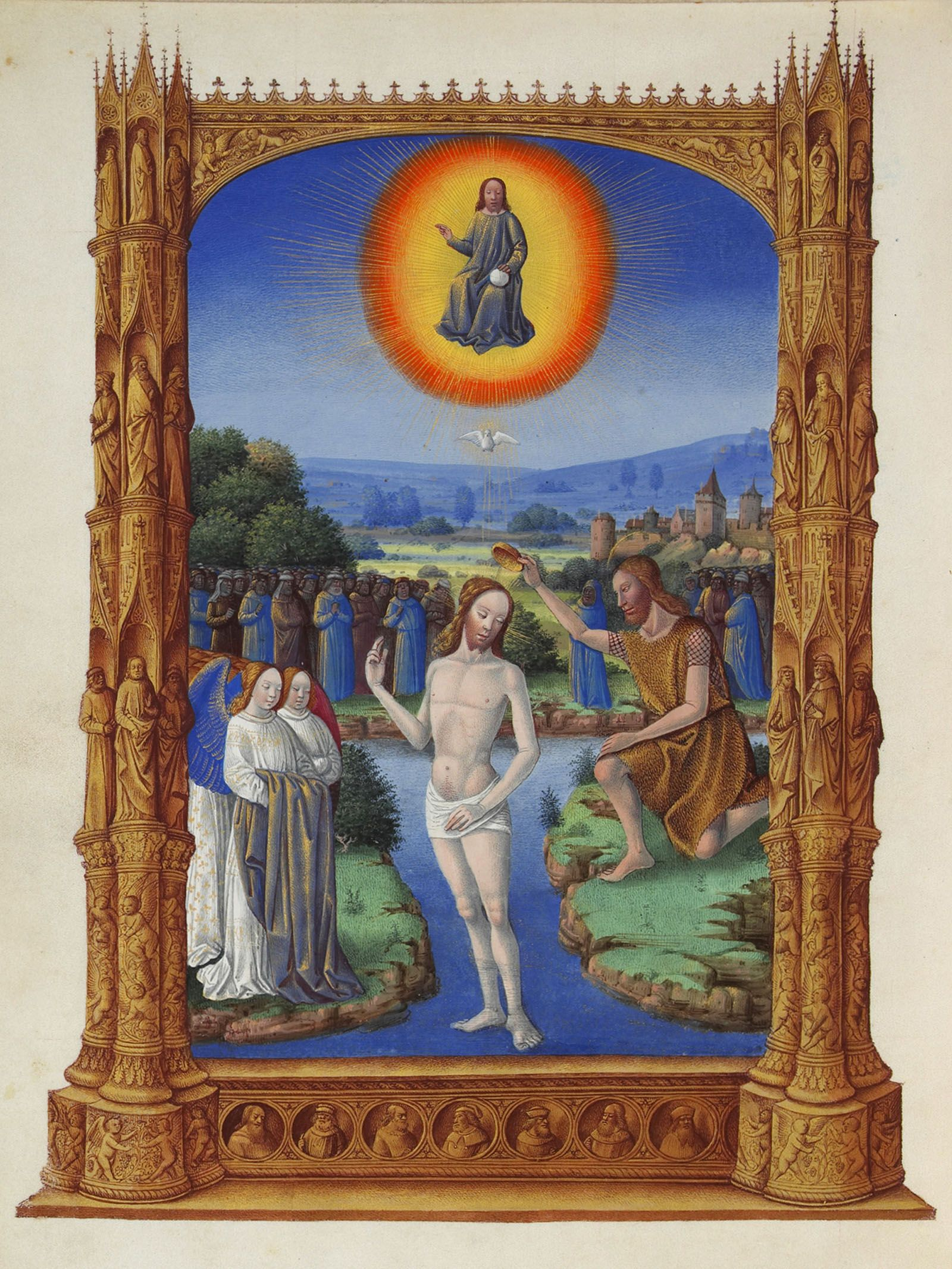
Miniature in Les Très Riches Heures du Duc de Berry depicting the Baptism of Jesus, where God the Father proclaimed Jesus to be his Son

Among Christians, "the Son" or Son of God refers to Jesus Christ. Trinitarian Christians see Jesus as the human incarnation of God the second person of the Trinity, known as God the Son. In the Gospels, Jesus sometimes refers to himself as the Son of Man in the Bible.

== Indications in names ==
In many cultures, the surname of the family means "son of", indicating a possible ancestry—i.e., that the whole family descends from a common ancestor. It may vary between the beginning or the termination of the surname.

Arabic

- bin or ibn. Examples: "Ibn Sina" ("son of Sina"), "Ibn Khaldun" ("son of Khaldun").

Berber

- U (also spelled ou). Examples: "Usadden" ("son of Sadden"), "Uâli" ("son of Âli").
- Ayt (also spelled ait or aït). Examples: "Ayt Buyafar" ("sons of Buyafar"), "Ayt Mellul" ("sons of Mellul").
- n Ayt (also spelled nait or naït). Examples: "n Ayt Ndir" ("son of the Ndir tribe/family"), "Naït Zerrad" ("son of the Zerrad tribe or family").

Danish

- Sen. Examples: "Henriksen" ("son of Henrik"), "Jensen" ("son of Jens"), "Andersen" ("son of Anders").

Dutch

- Sen. Examples: "Jansen" ("son of Jan"), "Petersen" ("son of Peter"), "Pietersen" ("son of Pieter")
- Zoon. Examples: "Janszoon" ("son of Jan"), "Peterszoon" ("son of Peter"), "Pieterszoon" ("son of Pieter")

English

- s. Examples: "Edwards" ("son of Edward"), "Williams" ("son of William"), "Jeffreys" ("son of Jeffrey")
- Son. Examples: "Jefferson" ("son of Jeffery"), "Wilson" ("son of William"), "Edson" ("son of Edward"), "Anderson" ("son of Ander").

French

- es. Example: "Fernandes" ("son of Fernand").
- ot. Example: "Pierrot" ("son of Pierre").
- de or d'. Example: "Danton" ("son of Anton").

Hebrew

- ben or bin before 1300 BC. Example: "Benjamin" ("son of a right-hand man"). Also, the Hebrew word for "person" is ben Adam, meaning "son of Adam".

Hindi

- beta. Example: "Mera beta Tim" ("my son Tim").
- बेटा. Example "मेरा बेटा टिम" ("my son Tim").

Hungarian

- -fi or -ffy. Examples: "Petőfi" ("son of Pető"), "Sándorfi" ("son of Sándor"), "Péterffy" ("son of Péter") (archaic spelling, indicates aristocratic origins).

Irish

- Mac or Mc. Examples: "MacThomas" ("son of Thomas"), "McDonald" ("son of Donald"), "MacLean" ("son of Lean").

Italian

- di. Examples: "di Stefano" ("son of Steven"), "di Giovanni" ("son of John"), "di Giuseppe" ("son of Joseph").
- de. Examples: "de Paolo" ("son of Paul"), "de Mauro" ("son of Maurus"), "de Giorgio" ("son of George").
- d`. Examples: "d'Antonio" ("son of Anthony"), "d'Adriano" ("son of Adrian"), "d'Agostino" ("son of Augustine").
- -i, which comes from Latin ending for Genitive. Examples: "Paoli" ("son of Paolo"), "Richetti" ("son of Richetto, a short name for Enrico").

Norwegian

- Son. Examples: "Magnusson" ("son of Magnus"); "Sigurdson" ("son of Sigurd"), "Odinson" ("son of Odin").

Persian

- pur/pour. Example: "Mahdipur" ("son of Mahdi").
- zadeh. Example: "Muhammadzadeh" ("son/daughter of Muhammad").

Tagalog

- Anak Example: mga Anak ni Pedro (son and daughter of Pedro)

Tamil

- Magan. Example: "En Magan Murugan" ("my son Murugan").
- மகன். Example "என் மகன் முருகன்" ("my son Murugan").

Polish

- ski. Examples: "Janowski" ("son of John"), "Piotrowski" ("son of Peter"), "Michalski" ("son of Michael").

Portuguese

- Es. Examples: "Gonçalves" ("son of Gonçalo"), "Henriques" ("son of Henrique"), "Fernandes" ("son of Fernando").

Romanian

- a as prefix (except for female names that start in "a" and probably for others that start in vowels) and ei as suffix. Example: "Amariei" ("son of Mary"), "Adomniței" ("son of Domnița"), "Alenei" ("son of Elena/Leana").
- escu or sometimes aşcu comes from the Latin -iscus which means "belonging to the people". Examples: "Petrescu" ("Petre's son"), "Popescu" ("Popa's son", Popa meaning Priest), "Constantinescu" ("son of Constantin").

Russian

- ov /ɒf/, ovich /əvɪtʃ/. Example: "Ivanov" ("son of Ivan").
- ev /ɛf/, evich /ɨvɪtʃ/. Example: "Dmitriev" ("son of Dmitri").

Spanish

- Ez. Examples: "González" ("son of Gonzalo"), "Henríquez" ("son of Henrique"), "Fernández" ("son of Fernando"), Gómez ("son of Gome"), Sánchez ("son of Sancho").

Turkish

- oğlu. Examples: "Elbeyioğlu" ("son of foreigner Bey"), "Ağaoğlu" ("son of Ağa"), "Yusufoğlu" ("son of Yusuf").
- zade. Examples: "Beyzade" (son of a Bey), "Aşıkpaşazade" ("son of Ashik Paşa), "Mehmedzade" (son of Mehmet).

Ukrainian

- -enko or -ko, meaning simply "son of". Example: "Kovalenko" ("son of Koval")
- sky . Examples: "Stanislavsky" ("son of Stanislav"), "Chaykovsky" ("son of Chayko"), "Petrovsky" ("son of Petro").
- shyn. Examples: "Petryshyn" ("son of Petro"), "Danylyshyn" ("son of Danylo").
- chuk. Example: "Ivanchuk" ("son of Ivan").

Welsh

- ap or ab. Examples: "ap Rhys" ("son of Rhys", anglicized to "Price"), "ab Owain" ("son of Owen", anglicized to Bowen).

=== Semitic ===
The Arabic word for son is ibn. Because family and ancestry are important cultural values in the Arab world and Islam, Arabs and most Muslims (e.g. Bruneian) often use bin, which is a form of ibn, in their full names. The bin here means "son of." For example, the Arab name "Saleh bin Tarif bin Khaled Al-Fulani" translates as "Saleh, son of Tarif, son of Khaled; of the family Al-Fulani" (cf. Arab family naming conventions). Accordingly, the opposite of ibn/bin is abu, meaning "the father of." It is a retronym, given upon the birth of one's first-born son, and is used as a moniker to indicate the newly acquired fatherhood status, rather than a family name. For example, if Mahmoud's first-born son is named Abdullah, from that point on Mahmoud can be called "Abu Abdullah."

This is cognate with the Hebrew language ben, as in "Judah ben Abram HaLevi," which means "Judah, son of Abram, the Levite." Ben is also a standalone name.
