= Habil Bey =

Circassian landowner who helped rescue Greeks in 1921

- Bikmezzade Habil Bey
- Died: 1926; Dysvato, Greece
- Occupation: Landowner
- Known for: Helping rescue 122 Pontic Greeks from Bafra during the Pontic Greek genocide
- Family: House of Dipsheu

Habil Bey, also known as Bikmezzade Habil Bey (Ottoman Turkish: بيكمززاده هابيل بك) or Dipsheu Habil Bey (Adyghe: Дыпшъэ Хьэбил-бей; died 1926), was an Ottoman Circassian landowner and philanthropist from Bafra.

Nicknamed Bafra's Oskar Schindler, he helped rescue 122 Greek civilians from his native region during the Greek genocide in 1921, personally paying for their escape. He later fled to Greece, where he died in 1926. He was buried with Muslim rites in a Christian cemetery.

== Biography ==
Habil's birth date is unknown, but he was known to have been in his forties in 1921. He lived in the village of Koşu, in Bafra. A descendant of victims of the Circassian genocide, he heard various stories about it from his elders in his youth. His father's name was Pshimaf (Adyghe: Пщымаф). He belonged to the House of Dipsheu, of Shapsug-Ubykh origin. Some of his relatives still live in Samsun today.

Habil owned an estate near Bafra and lived in the village Koşu, where Circassian immigrants had settled among the local Greek population. He was a devout Muslim and maintained friendly relations with the local Christians, some of whom were among his close friends.

=== Rescue of Greeks ===
During the Pontic Greek genocide, Habil learnt of an incoming attack against the inhabitants of a Greek village near Samsun by Turkish irregulars (çetes). The attack was to take place the following day. He firmly opposed it and, rather than participate in it, warned the villagers and accompanied them into the mountains, where they took shelter alongside Greek resistance fighters.

In June 1921, Hippocrates Dedeoglou, known by his nom de guerre "İppok Ağa", sought to remove his relatives and other Greeks from Bafra after he heard reports of killings and murders of Greeks. Dedeoglou asked Habil for help. The two worked with each other, alongside Habil's two nephews, Eyüp and Kadir, in order to take 122 Greek civilians out of the town at night. Some were taken to the mountains and others to Habil's estate near the coast.

Habil helped arrange their escape by sea, contacting captains of boats carrying goods to Bafra from Constantinople and personally paying the refugees' fares. The refugees left in two groups of 101 and 21 people, eventually reaching Greece.

When the Turkish authorities began searching for him, Habil abandoned all of his property and, in disguise, fled through Trabzon to Constantinople. He later sent himself into exile to Greece with Eyüp and Kadir, settling in Athens.

=== Exile and death ===
Habil developed tuberculosis while living in Athens. Dedeoglou personally invited him to join him near Kavala, where he was living among other refugees from Bafra. Habil took up on the offer and settled in the refugee village of Dysvato in 1926, dying there the same year.

The Greek refugees buried him with Muslim rites in their Christian cemetery, with an imam brought from Xanthi to conduct his Islamic funeral. They placed a marble inscription on his grave commemorating his rescue of their compatriots. Following the funeral, one of the refugees became concerned that the inscription identifying Habil as a Muslim might eventually become illegible, leading future generations to place a Christian cross on his grave. To prevent this, he travelled to Kavala, took a turbaned gravestone and erected it at the head of Habil's grave. Even today, his grave remains marked by a marble inscription and that same headstone instead of a cross. The inscription on his grave reads:

A philhellene Circassian landowner from Bafra, who saved 122 Bafraians from slaughter by the Turks in 1921. Persecuted by the Kemalist authorities, he fled to Athens, where he contracted tuberculosis. In 1926, he came to Dysvato to be near his friend, the resistance commander Hippocrates Dedeoglou, and died. The inhabitants of Dysvato who came from Bafra in Pontus buried him in their cemetery, honouring this philhellene, compassionate and noble man. Eternal be the memory of the philhellene Circassian Habil Bey.

== Legacy ==
Habil's grave continued to be maintained by the local community after his death. In his native Bafra, some regarded him as a humanitarian, while others denounced him as a "collaborator" who helped Greeks.

On 22 September 2017, descendants of the Bafra refugees held a ceremony in Habil's memory at Dysvato, the village in which he died. In April 2025, the Pontic association of Zygos announced a tribute for him as part of its annual celebration of Pontic wedding customs.

Habil has been compared to Oskar Schindler, a German industrialist and humanitarian who is credited with saving the lives of 1,200 Jews during the Holocaust.

== Sources ==
- Ahıshalıoğlu, Alptekin (1 January 2013). "Habil Bey'in listesi". Jineps (in Turkish).
- Andreadis, Georgios (20 June 2024). "Ο Χαμπίλ Μπέης" [Habil Bey]. Excerpt from Μαγκάλι μνήμης – Ιστορίες ξεχασμένες κι απ’ τον Θεό ακόμα. Pontos News (in Greek).
- Özsoy, İskender (27 November 2015). "Bafra'nın saklı tarihinden bir özel sayfa: Sürgün yollarını dostlukla aştılar". BRT Haber (in Turkish).
- Özsoy, İskender (20 September 2024). "Bafra'nın Schindler'i Çerkes Beyi Bikmezzade Habil". Barış İçin Aktivite (in Turkish).
- Pavlidis, Theodoros (13 March 2013). "Ένας αληθινός φιλέλληνας και ανθρωπιστής" [A true philhellene and humanitarian]. Eidisis (in Greek).
- Pontos News (30 September 2017). "Τιμήθηκε ο Χαμπίλ μπέης, ο άνθρωπος που έσωσε 122 Παφραίους" [Habil Bey, the man who saved 122 people from Bafra, honoured]. Pontos News (in Greek).
- Pontos News (24 April 2025). "Ποντιακός Σύλλογος Ζυγού Καβάλας: Ένα διαφορετικό διήμερο με γλέντι, ποντιακό γάμο και αφιέρωμα στον Χαμπίλ μπέη" [Pontic association of Zygos, Kavala: A two-day programme with festivities, a Pontic wedding and a tribute to Habil Bey]. Pontos News (in Greek).
- Süren, Jiy Zafer (1 August 2026). "Üç kuzen operasyonu mu?". Jineps Gazetesi (in Turkish).
- Şıble, Ferhatıko (2022). Batı Çerkesya'nın Türkiye'deki evlatları (in Turkish). ISBN 978-605-71993-1-7.
