= House of Dipsheu =

Circassian house of privateer origin

House of Dipsheu Дыпшъэ Пшъаукъо
- Circassian house of privateer origin
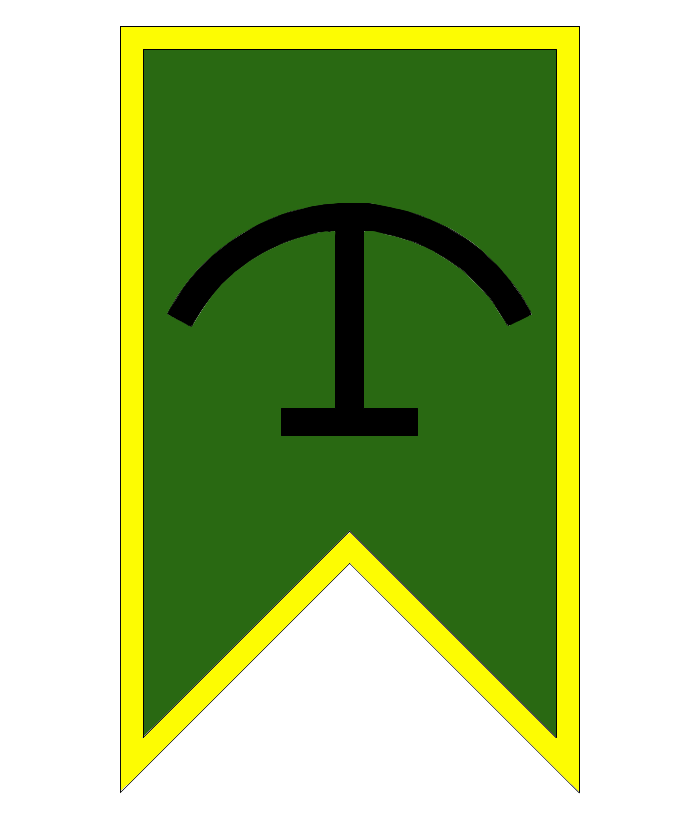
- Country: Circassia (formerly); Russian Empire (formerly); Mountainous Republic of the Northern Caucasus (formerly); Soviet Union (formerly); Russia; Turkey
- Etymology: Dipsheu (Дыпщэу) meaning "our Psheu"
- Origin: Psheu valley, Ubykhia, Circassia (present-day Psou River, Krasnodar Krai, Russia and northwesternmost Abkhazia)
- Founded: Unknown
- Traditions: Khabzeism; Sunni Islam

House of Dipsheu (also referred to as Psheu) (Ubykh: Дыпшъэ, Russian: Дипшов) is a Circassian privateer house of Ubykhia and Shapsugia of Circassia, who controlled the entirety of Psou River until the end of Russo-Circassian War. The Shapsug branch was known as Psheu or Psheuqo (Adyghe: Пшъаукъо). They were known for their privateer activities along the Black Sea coast of Circassia. They are found in Adygea and Krasnodar Krai within Russian Federation; as well as in Republic of Turkey due to Circassian genocide in the present day. The family has Shapsug and Ubykh branches.

== Etymology ==
Dipsheu means "our Psheu" in Ubykh: Дипшэу, referring that the family ruled over the valley which Psou River is flowing through, which is the present-day border of Russian Federation and Abkhazia.

== Notable members ==
- Psheu Ali Bey
- Psheu Ethem
- Psheu Reşit
- Psheu Tevfik
- Dipsheu Habil Bey
