= Çerkes Ethem =

Ottoman militia leader (1886–1948)

Efe Çerkes Ethem Bey
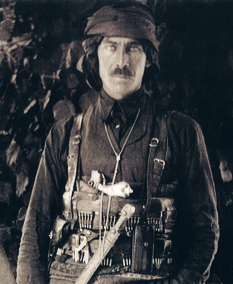
- Born: 1886; Bandırma, Hüdavendigâr Vilayet, Ottoman Empire (present-day Balıkesir, Turkey)
- Died: September 21, 1948 (aged 61–62); Amman, Jordan
- Burial place: Al-Misdar islamic cemetery, Amman, Jordan
- Education: Bakırköy Cavalry Junior Officer School
- Relatives: House of Dipsheu
- Military career
- Allegiance: Ottoman Empire (1900–1919) (Turkey) Ankara Government (1919–1920) (Kingdom of Greece) Greece (since 1920)
- Branch: Kuva-yi Seyyare
- Conflicts: Balkan Wars; World War I Turkish War of Independence: Greco-Turkish War (1919–1922); Revolt of Ahmet Anzavur

Çerkes Ethem (1886 – 21 September 1948, also known as Psheu Ethem; Adyghe: Пшъаукъо ӏэтхьэм), known in English as Edhem the Circassian, was an Ottoman Circassian guerilla leader, social bandit, efe and soldier. He established the Kuva-yi Seyyare.

Initially siding with the Ankara Government, he put down multiple large-scale rebellions and gained several victories during the Turkish War of Independence. However, as Ethem's Islamic socialist views clashed with the Turkish nationalism of the Turkish National Movement, he cut ties with them to act independently, and was later attacked and defeated by İsmet İnönü. On 27 December 1920, Ethem was declared a "rebel" by the Ankara Government and on 26 January 1921, he surrendered to the Greek Army. After the Treaty of Lausanne, he moved to Greece and later travelled throughout the Middle East, seeking support to overthrow Mustafa Kemal.

He is widely considered one of the most prominent "traitors" in Turkish national historiography, despite his prominent role at key junctures in the independence war: after his fallout with Ataturk and İnönü, his collaboration with Greece and his undisguised dislike of the new nationalist regime meant that he would be seen as a villain by the nation-state they founded.

== Early life and family ==
His family, House of Dipsheu, was originally a famous pirate clan from the coastal provinces of Circassia, who were exiled to Ottoman Empire in the 1860s during the Circassian genocide. Ethem himself spoke the Adyghe language fluently.

Ethem was born in the Emre village of Bandırma as the son of Psheu Ali Bey. One of his brothers, Reshit, was a Member of Parliament for Saruhan (present-day Manisa) in the Grand National Assembly of Turkey's first legislative term and previously in the fourth term of the Chamber of Deputies of the Ottoman Empire. His other brother Tevfik was a senior military officer who graduated from the Ottoman Military College in 1902.

Ethem had blond hair, light blue eyes, and very pale skin, as described by Halide Edib Adıvar. He stood at 2.00 m (6 ft 7 in) tall.

== Education and military career ==
He ran away from home when he was 14 years old to join Bakırköy Cavalry Junior Officer School. He joined the Balkan War and was wounded on the Bulgarian front. As a result, he was awarded with honours and seniority allowance. Later he joined the Ottoman Special Organization organized by Eşref Kuşçubaşı and participated in operations in Afghanistan and Iraq during World War I. He was again wounded and retired to his village.

He later founded Kuvâ-yi Seyyâre which was the only organized military force in Anatolia during 1919–1920 period between the Armistice of Mudros and the Treaty of Sèvres. He coordinated his military operations with Ali Fuat Pasha in Ankara and harassed the Greek armies with his fast cavalry. He was instrumental in putting down various rebellions against the authority of the Grand National Assembly of Turkey. Çerkes Ethem was initially an ally of Mustafa Kemal Atatürk who appreciated him for his successful fight against invading Allied armies and bandits in different regions of Turkey. Atatürk awarded Ethem the Circassian with the title of Millî Kahraman (National Hero).

=== Kuva-yi Seyyare ===
The Kuvâ-yi Seyyâre was a force of Islamic socialist North Caucasian volunteers, led by Ethem against the allied invasion forces in Anatolia during the Turkish War of Independence. The group saw themselves as a force to fight against "those who caused disturbance to the greater good of Anatolia".

=== Surrender to the Greek Army and consequences ===
The Greeks treat those who surrender and fall into their hands very well. The greatest proof of this is our situation. It is our patriotic duty and a matter of humanity not to be an instrument of evil for the legitimate government of Ankara, whose intentions for the homeland are clearly not pure.

— Çerkes Ethem, March 1921

Left to right: An unnamed Greek officer, Çerkes Ethem, Eşref Sencer (Kuşçubaşı) and Christos D. Karassos. 28 January 1921, Susurluk.

According to Mustafa Kemal, Çerkes Ethem had entered into a feud with Ankara since August 1920. By November 1920, the dispute had escalated a lot. The Turks and Ethem's Circassians entered an open conflict in December 1920, when they refused to join Ismet İnönü's regular army forces. On 27 December 1920, he was declared a "rebel". On 8 January 1920, Mustafa Kemal accused Ethem and his brothers, Tevfik and Reşit, of rebellious actions and of providing secrets to the Greek Army. On 26 January 1921, Ethem and his Kuva-yi Seyyare surrendered to the Greeks. He later gave an interview to the Greek newspaper Cosmos explaining his anti-Kemalist stance.

Ethem's defection was considered so egregious amongst Turkish nationalists of the time, that all Circassians were blamed. The head of the local gendarmerie in Manyas said that:

Any place that they were accepted into our kind homeland, these refugee Circassians would threaten, “Give over the cash box otherwise I will kill you,” before attacking a house and stealing.

Akıncı Ibrahim was already arguing by 1920 that Circassians desired to "crush the Turks" after Ahmet Anzavur's rebellion. After Ethem's defection he, too, blamed all Circassians for Ethem's departure, going even further by stating that:

The Circassians are the ones who have brought disaster upon us. While we were fighting, they would do no other thing other than sell their homeland. Now they are corrupt to the basest level, surrendering to the Greeks while they fill up their saddlebags. The penalty for them is the bullet.

According to historian Ryan Gingeras, "statements such as these suggest that many within the Nationalist camp, particularly in the south Marmara, linked Circassians, crime, treason, and apostasy".

After the defection, Gingeras summarizes:

Ethem’s capitulation to the Greeks was soon followed by an even more vulgar display of “Circassian treason.” In November of 1921, a meeting of provincial Circassian notables was held in Greek-occupied Izmir. In a series of declarations circulated throughout Anatolia and to various Western delegations, the congress, calling itself the Association for the Strengthening of Near Eastern Circassian Rights, declared that it was the intention of all North Caucasians in Anatolia to abandon the Nationalist struggle and to form a joint Greek-Circassian protectorate in northwestern Anatolia. After decades of mistreatment by the Ottoman government following their mass exodus from the Caucasus, the congress argued that Circassians now feared that the National Movement was seeking to exterminate them much as the Ottoman government had previously attempted to wipe out Anatolia’s Greek and Armenian population.

In June 1921, Ethem proposed a joint Greek–Circassian military expedition intended to strike the Turkish National Movement from Pontus. The situation was immediately communicated to Athens, and Çerkes Ethem was urgently summoned there, with Ethem even being brought before King Constantine I of Greece, but the plan never materialized. Nevertheless, Çerkes Reşit, Ethem's brother, personally believed in Constantine, stating that a Greek army of 50,000 men commanded by the King could capture Ankara within 20–30 days.

Historian Сem Kumuk summarizes how many Circassians, as well as Abkhazians, were forced to flee the region after Ethem's defection, in fear of Turkish reprisals. He writes: "A large number of North Caucasian immigrants living in the Southern and Eastern Marmara regions began to worry about their future and sought refuge in Greece towards the end of 1921. These refugee groups, numbering around 4,000 people, were accommodated in Athens and Thessaloniki". Ethem and his brothers took part in a meeting of the "Association for the Strengthening of Near Eastern Circassian Rights", as representatives (amongst many others), producing a statement which read, partly, as follows:

This meeting, which is in the form of a congress, undertakes its national rights as a minority based on the national rights as determined by the national principles accepted and declared by the Great Powers at the end of the Great War. The representatives ask for their national demands with the declaration that the Circassians will seek refuge under the Allied Great Powers and its partners, in particular the Greek government, who agreed among themselves to force the acceptance [of these rights] of the losing states...

The population of Circassians today residing in Anatolia is at the very least two million. Circassians defend and maintain their national traditions through language, customs, feelings, and civilization... They are in the contemporary family of civilizations and are a part of the white race and the distinguished Aryan family...

Thirteen years before with the institution of constitutional rule, the Turkish administration became bereft of correct policies. Now filled with feelings [stemming] from Turkism and Turanism, Turkish administrators followed at this unique moment in history a false policy of terrorism, by means of Turkification, towards the various Ottoman nationalities. With the destruction of the nationalities and the destruction of the vital security of non-Turks, the Circassians were stirred with a just grievance coming from a pure desire of self-preservation. Because of these continuous calamities, Circassians have [moved toward] a national goal of self-preservation and commit themselves to armed resistance against the mass murder of the Circassian nation.

Because of this, Circassians have lost thousands of their precious children. Their property and animals have been stolen and their villages burned. In short, Circassians have been and continue to be in a state of defiance in this war despite being allotted no sanctuary and the destruction and seizure of their property...

After seeing that they will not be saved, Circassians decided correctly and naturally to join the Greek army, which promises to preserve them, in the occupation zone. (There is no doubt that Albania and the Arab States similarly sought in foreign saviors well before.) These Circassians, who have struggled for a year and a half and who have saved thousands of innocent Muslims and non-Muslims from mass murder, should be praised for their services...

The understanding Greek government, which is included in the highest levels of civilization and humanity among nations, recognizes no difference among Circassians, Armenians, and especially Rum [Greeks]. It has provided for the welfare of Circassian immigrants and refugees in the form of substance and settlement...

The goals of this petition are:

A – Recognition of our national existence.
B – To make known that the secular Circassian nation lives in constant danger.
C – To advance the demand that the Circassians wish to live as an element of peace under Greek protection in order to protect the Circassians of the Near East from the sins of the Turkish administration.

— Şark-ı Karib Çerkesleri Temin-i Hukuk Cemiyeti, The General Statement of the Circassian Nation to the Great Powers and the Civilized World

This debacle resulted in Ethem's citizenship getting revoked on the grounds of treason and he was declared persona non grata by the TBMM, amongst many others. Circassians lived under an assimiliationist and oppressive regime in the newly established Republic of Turkey.

During the Greek retreat in August–September 1922, Turkish sources allege that Ethem and his Circassians participated in brutalities against Turks, stating that they took part in burnings, destruction, looting, killings and other atrocities in Manisa, Salihli and Turgutlu.

== Later anti-Kemalist activities ==
After the war, Ethem fled to the Greek islands near the Anatolian shore. Circassians supporting Greece were thousands, but they were not counted officially; estimates vary, but they might have numbered up to 20,000 in total. In February 1923, they also created the "Circassian Volunteer Corps of Mytilene", in order to support Greece if an attack on Thrace by Turkey happened. A 1923 correspondence report from Turkish military services suggested that Circassian dissidents, including Ethem and Eşref Sencer Kuşçubaşı, were expected to organize an attack with 20,000 Circassians and 8,000 Greek volunteers, though the report was likely exaggerated, as the Turkish government slowly started becoming extremely paranoid.

After the Treaty of Lausanne was officially signed and hostilities were over, Ethem lived in Athens and spent a lot of his time in Greek kafenia and breweries, discussing with other Circassian leaders. Alongside his brothers and several former officers, Ethem led one of the four anti-Kemalist organizations operating in Greece. He devised many plans to assassinate Mustafa Kemal and to overthrow the Kemalist government, supported initially by the Greek government, as well as other European governments.

In April 1925, he left Greece to go to Baghdad, British Iraq, using a Greek passport, in order to negotiate with Tahir al-Jazairi. In June–July 1925, he was in French Lebanon and Syria, first in Beirut and then in Aleppo, contacting associates and sending agents in Urfa. In 1927, he was involved in an assassination plan against Mustafa Kemal, which was meant to organize a team to blow up the presidential train of Kemal and incite a large-scale rebellion against him. In 1928, he established contacts with Kurdish tribes in northern Iraq. As Greek-Turkish relations improved, Greek support for Ethem's projects waned.

In 1932, Amman, in British Transjordan, became Ethem's base. Plans were discussed by Ethem and his associates to build Circassian-dominated anti-Kemalist movement, recruiting Circassians from Egypt, Jordan, Syria, and Greece, as well as for Circassian, Kurdish and Armenian cooperation against Kemalist Turkey. These plans were supported by Ottoman prince Şehzade Mehmed Selim. In 1935, Turkish prosecutors alleged that Ethem was involved in another assassination attempt against Kemal, but all defendants in the case were acquitted in 1936 due to lack of evidence. In 1938, he created the "Türkiye-Anadolu Yıldırım Komitesi" (Turkey–Anatolia Thunderbolt Committee), aimed to overthrow the Kemalist regime and establish a state "that would provide freedom and equality to its citizens".

In 1941, Ethem sought to move to Damascus, in French Syria, but he was prevented from doing so by French authorities. Following pressure from Turkey, he was arrested briefly by the French, but was later freed. He moved to Aleppo, where he met with Circassian activists and discussed the possibility of a German victory over the Soviet Union and the creation of Circassian political structures under German protection.

In 1942, Ethem tried to return to Turkey, but was rejected by Turkish authorities. The General Directorate of Security requested his citizenship to be revoked, although this wasn't carried out. He, once again, tried to return to Turkey in 1947 but was, once again, refused entry.

== Death and burial ==
Ethem continued to discuss about, and wish for, the overthrow of the Kemalist regime until the end of his life. He died on 21 September 1948 near River Jordan in Amman, Jordan. He was buried in the Islamic cemetery. Before his death, he had requested for his grave to be unmarked and he was buried next to the wall of the cemetery.

=== Remembrance in literature ===
In her 1928 work The Turkish Ordeal, Halide Edib Adıvar mentions the first time she saw Ethem the Circassian and how respected he was by Mustafa Kemal Atatürk in addition to describing Ethem Bey's physical appearance in a very positive way.

=== Exhumation and reburial plans ===
In 2015, the deputy prime minister of Turkey, Bülent Arınç announced the planned exhumation and reburial of Ethem Bey in Turkey where he was born. This has not been carried out.
