= Kuva-yi Seyyare =

Force of Circassian volunteers in Anatolia

Kuvâ-yi Seyyâre
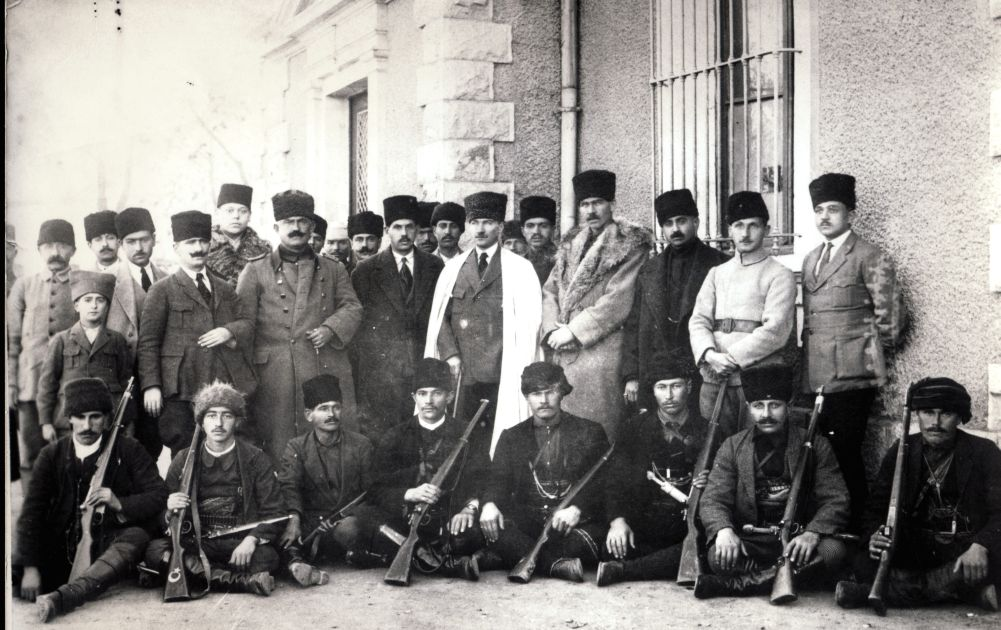
- Ethem the Circassian and Mustafa Kemal Pasha meet in Yozgat, they are posing with the Kuva-yi Seyyare. 1920.
- Active: 1919–1921
- Country: Ottoman Empire
- Allegiance: Turkish National Movement (1919–1920) (Kingdom of Greece) Greece (since 1920)
- Type: Field Army
- Nicknames: Green Army; Anatolian Army
- Engagements: Turkish War of Independence; Revolt of Ahmet Anzavur

Commanders
- Notable commanders: Çerkes Ethem

Kuvâ-yi Seyyâre (Ottoman Turkish: قواى سياره, lit. 'The Traveling Forces' or 'The Mobilized Forces'), also known as the Green Army Society (Turkish: Yeşil Ordu Cemiyeti) or the People's Branch (Turkish: Halk Zümresi) was a force of Circassian and Abkhazian volunteers led by Çerkes Ethem during the Turkish War of Independence.

Initially siding with the Ankara Government, it put down multiple large-scale rebellions and gained several victories in the Turkish War of Independence. However, as the group's Islamic socialist views and its desire to retain its independent military structure clashed with the Turkish nationalism and increasing centralization of the Turkish National Movement, it cut ties with them to act independently, and was later attacked and defeated by İsmet İnönü. By December 1920, its leadershad entered into negotiations with the Greeks, sending envoys to Uşak in an attempt to reach an agreement. On 27 December, Ethem was declared a "rebel" by the Ankara Government, and by 22 January 1921 the Kuva-yi Seyyare had been dispersed. Then, Ethem and a number of the Kuva-yi Seyyare's remnants officially crossed over to the Greek Army. After the Treaty of Lausanne, its leaders moved to Greece and later travelled throughout the Middle East, seeking support to overthrow Mustafa Kemal.

== History ==
Kuvâ-yi Seyyâre, founded by Ethem Dipsheu, was the only semi-organized military force in Anatolia during 1919–1920 period between the Armistice of Mudros and the Treaty of Sèvres. It initially sided with the Kemalist insurgents.

However, according to Mustafa Kemal, Çerkes Ethem and the Kuvâ-yi Seyyâre had entered into a feud with Ankara since August 1920. By November 1920, the dispute had escalated a lot. The Turks and Ethem's Circassians entered an open conflict in December 1920, when they refused to join Ismet İnönü's regular army forces. During the same month, the Kuva-yi Seyyare leadership sent envoys to Greek-held Uşak in an attempt to reach an agreement with the Greeks, after which Reşit Bey, Çerkes Ethem’s older brother and one of the political leaders behind the force, followed them to the Greek headquarters. On 27 December 1920, the Kuvâ-yi Seyyâre were declared rebels. On 8 January 1920, Mustafa Kemal accused Ethem and his brothers, Tevfik and Reşit, of rebellious actions and of providing secrets to the Greek Army. On 22 January, Refet Bele Pasha dispersed the movement, while on 26 January, Ethem and some of the Kuva-yi Seyyare remnants officially surrendered to the Greeks.

Ethem's defection was considered so egregious amongst Turkish nationalists of the time, that all Circassians were blamed. The head of the local gendarmerie in Manyas said that:

Any place that they were accepted into our kind homeland, these refugee Circassians would threaten, “Give over the cash box otherwise I will kill you,” before attacking a house and stealing.

Akıncı Ibrahim was already arguing by 1920 that Circassians desired to "crush the Turks" after Ahmet Anzavur's rebellion. After Ethem's defection he, too, blamed all Circassians for Ethem's departure, going even further by stating that:

The Circassians are the ones who have brought disaster upon us. While we were fighting, they would do no other thing other than sell their homeland. Now they are corrupt to the basest level, surrendering to the Greeks while they fill up their saddlebags. The penalty for them is the bullet.

According to historian Ryan Gingeras, "statements such as these suggest that many within the Nationalist camp, particularly in the south Marmara, linked Circassians, crime, treason, and apostasy". After the defection, Gingeras summarizes:

Ethem’s capitulation to the Greeks was soon followed by an even more vulgar display of “Circassian treason.” In November of 1921, a meeting of provincial Circassian notables was held in Greek-occupied Izmir. In a series of declarations circulated throughout Anatolia and to various Western delegations, the congress, calling itself the Association for the Strengthening of Near Eastern Circassian Rights, declared that it was the intention of all North Caucasians in Anatolia to abandon the Nationalist struggle and to form a joint Greek-Circassian protectorate in northwestern Anatolia. After decades of mistreatment by the Ottoman government following their mass exodus from the Caucasus, the congress argued that Circassians now feared that the National Movement was seeking to exterminate them much as the Ottoman government had previously attempted to wipe out Anatolia’s Greek and Armenian population.

Historian Сem Kumuk summarizes how many Circassians, as well as Abkhazians, were forced to flee the region after Ethem's defection, in fear of Turkish reprisals. He writes: "A large number of North Caucasian immigrants living in the Southern and Eastern Marmara regions began to worry about their future and sought refuge in Greece towards the end of 1921. These refugee groups, numbering around 4,000 people, were accommodated in Athens and Thessaloniki". Ethem and his brothers took part in a meeting of the "Association for the Strengthening of Near Eastern Circassian Rights", as representatives (amongst many others), producing a statement which read, partly, as follows:

This meeting, which is in the form of a congress, undertakes its national rights as a minority based on the national rights as determined by the national principles accepted and declared by the Great Powers at the end of the Great War. The representatives ask for their national demands with the declaration that the Circassians will seek refuge under the Allied Great Powers and its partners, in particular the Greek government, who agreed among themselves to force the acceptance [of these rights] of the losing states...

The population of Circassians today residing in Anatolia is at the very least two million. Circassians defend and maintain their national traditions through language, customs, feelings, and civilization... They are in the contemporary family of civilizations and are a part of the white race and the distinguished Aryan family...

Thirteen years before with the institution of constitutional rule, the Turkish administration became bereft of correct policies. Now filled with feelings [stemming] from Turkism and Turanism, Turkish administrators followed at this unique moment in history a false policy of terrorism, by means of Turkification, towards the various Ottoman nationalities. With the destruction of the nationalities and the destruction of the vital security of non-Turks, the Circassians were stirred with a just grievance coming from a pure desire of self-preservation. Because of these continuous calamities, Circassians have [moved toward] a national goal of self-preservation and commit themselves to armed resistance against the mass murder of the Circassian nation.

Because of this, Circassians have lost thousands of their precious children. Their property and animals have been stolen and their villages burned. In short, Circassians have been and continue to be in a state of defiance in this war despite being allotted no sanctuary and the destruction and seizure of their property...

After seeing that they will not be saved, Circassians decided correctly and naturally to join the Greek army, which promises to preserve them, in the occupation zone. (There is no doubt that Albania and the Arab States similarly sought in foreign saviors well before.) These Circassians, who have struggled for a year and a half and who have saved thousands of innocent Muslims and non-Muslims from mass murder, should be praised for their services...

The understanding Greek government, which is included in the highest levels of civilization and humanity among nations, recognizes no difference among Circassians, Armenians, and especially Rum [Greeks]. It has provided for the welfare of Circassian immigrants and refugees in the form of substance and settlement...

The goals of this petition are:

A – Recognition of our national existence.
B – To make known that the secular Circassian nation lives in constant danger.
C – To advance the demand that the Circassians wish to live as an element of peace under Greek protection in order to protect the Circassians of the Near East from the sins of the Turkish administration.

— Şark-ı Karib Çerkesleri Temin-i Hukuk Cemiyeti, The General Statement of the Circassian Nation to the Great Powers and the Civilized World

This debacle resulted in Ethem's citizenship getting revoked on the grounds of treason and he was declared persona non grata by the TBMM, amongst many others.

During the Greek retreat in August–September 1922, Turkish sources allege that Ethem and his Kuvâ-yi Seyyâre participated in brutalities against Turks, stating that they took part in burnings, destruction, looting, killings and other atrocities in Manisa, Salihli and Turgutlu.

After the war, Ethem and the remnants of the Kuvâ-yi Seyyâre fled to the Greek islands near the Anatolian shore. Circassians supporting Greece were thousands, but they were not counted officially; estimates vary, but they might have numbered up to 20,000 in total. In February 1923, they also created the "Circassian Volunteer Corps of Mytilene", in order to support Greece if an attack on Thrace by Turkey happened. A 1923 correspondence report from Turkish military services suggested that Circassian dissidents, including Ethem and Eşref Sencer Kuşçubaşı, were expected to organize an attack with 20,000 Circassians and 8,000 Greek volunteers, though the report was likely exaggerated, as the Turkish government slowly started becoming extremely paranoid.

Circassians proceeded to live under an assimiliationist and oppressive regime in the newly established Republic of Turkey.
