= Agafangel =

Agafangel (Russian: Агафа́нгел) is an old and rare Russian Christian male first name. The name is derived from the Greek name Agathangelos, which in turn derives from the words agathos—meaning kind, good—and angelos—meaning bearer of news, messenger.

The diminutives of "Agafangel" are Aga (А́га), Fanya (Фа́ня), and Agafangelka (Агафа́нгелка).

The patronymics derived from "Agafangel" are "Агафа́нгелович" (Agafangelovich; masculine) and "Агафа́нгеловна" (Agafangelovna; feminine). Notable individuals with the surname include:

- Agafangel (Savvin) (born 1938), Bishop of the Ukrainian Orthodox Church
