= Henry Franklin-Bouillon =

French politician

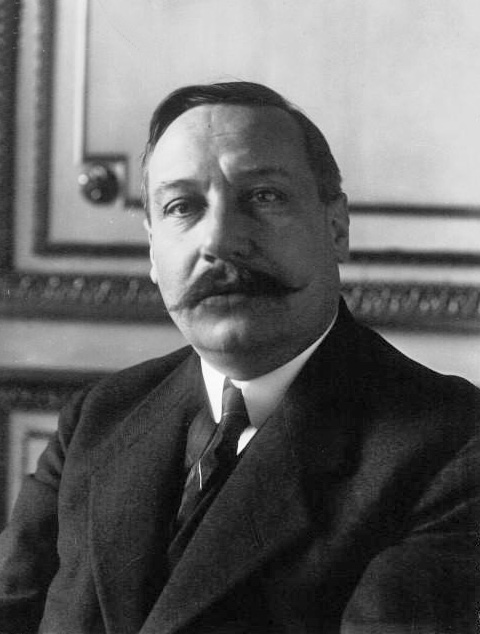

French parliamentarian
- In office 1910–1936
- Constituency: Seine-et-Oise

Personal details
- Born: 3 September 1870
- Died: 12 November 1937 (aged 67)
- Party: Social and Radical Left
- Other political affiliations: Radical-Socialist Party (1910-1928)

Henry Franklin-Bouillon (3 September 1870 - 12 November 1937) was a French politician.

Franklin-Bouillon was born in St Helier, Jersey. He began as a member of the Radical-Socialist Party, but belonged to its furthest right-wing: he advocated that the Radical-Socialists join with Poincaré's alliance of centre-right and right-wing parties to oppose communism and socialism and support punitive military policy towards Germany. In 1927 these stances prompted him to lead two-dozen like-minded deputies to quit the Radical-Socialist Party, forming a mid-sized centre-right parliamentary party of Independent Radicals, named the Social and Radical Left group.

He met Mustafa Kemal Atatürk in Ankara in 1921 and they became close friends. In 1922 he travelled through the devastated areas by the retreating Greek army and after visiting the burned town of Manisa, he declared that out of 11,000 houses in the city of Magnesia (Manisa) only 1,000 remained.

Franklin-Bouillon died aged 67 in Paris.
