= Mafia: A Global History =

2026 non-fiction book by Ryan Gingeras

- Author: Ryan Gingeras
- Language: English
- Subject: Organized Crime
- Genre: Non-fiction
- Publisher: Simon & Schuster
- Publication date: 2026
- ISBN: 978-1668056424

Mafia: A Global History is a historical analysis of mafias by Ryan Gingeras, published in 2026 by Simon & Schuster. It traces the growth of organised crime in the US, Latin America, Southern Europe and Southeast Asia from the beginning of the nineteenth century.

== Synopsis ==
The book is divided into three parts, titled Genesis, Consolidation and Transformation.

The first part traces the evolution of banditry into organised crime networks. He mentions that some bandits were in fact co-opted by young states, who "needed a muscle". The second part deals with the rise of "true mafias" in the beginning of the 20th century and the growth of global networks of illegal drug trade. Among other things, the author tries to establish a connection between prohibition, be it gambling or opium or alcohol, and the growth of mafia. The last part deals with the evolution of organised crime in the post Second War period.

The author views mafia as a kind of "rogue entrepreneurialism" which have had their impact in shaping the world as we see it now. He argues that mafia often run tandem with terrorist networks, citing examples. The book includes interpolations from movies ranging from The Godfather and Scarface to lesser known movies such as Salvatore Giuliano.

The work refers to the impact the Racketeer Influenced and Corrupt Organizations Act of 1970 had on the decline of mafia the United States and also to the Palermo Convention against transnational organised crime.

== Reception ==
Ian Thomson, writing in The Times Literary Supplement, stated that it is "an excellent history of all things murderous and mobster". Sara Wheeler, in a review published by Financial Times, mentioned that the range of the book is very vast, that "the history at times has a potted flavour" and it "occasionally teeters into bathos".
