= Social and Radical Left =

The Social and Radical Left (French: Gauche sociale et radicale, GSR) was a parliamentary group in the Chamber of Deputies of France during the French Third Republic founded in 1928 by Henry Franklin-Bouillon. The Social-Radicals or Social-Unionists were members of the right wing of the Radical-Socialist Party who refused a new Cartel des Gauches and supported the conservative coalition led by Raymond Poincaré. Most later became members of the Independent Radicals (PRI) or even the centre-right Democratic Republican Alliance.

The Social and Radical Left had 17 seats out of 607 in the Chamber of Deputies in 1929

== See also ==
- Liberalism and radicalism in France
- History of the Left in France
- Independent Radicals
- Sinistrisme
