= Firuz Agha Mosque =

Mosque in Fatih, Istanbul, Turkey

Firuz Ağa Mosque
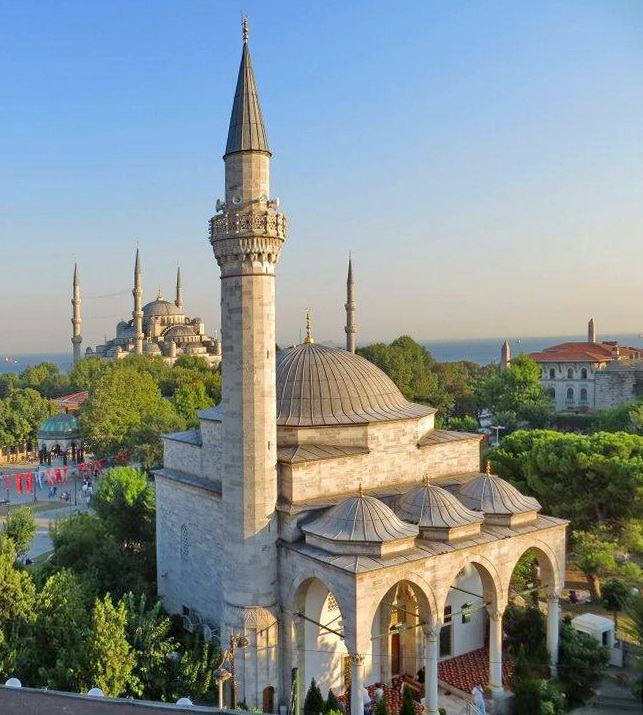

- Location within Istanbul

Religion
- Affiliation: Islam

Location
- Municipality: Istanbul
- Country: Turkey
- Interactive map of Firuz Ağa Mosque
- Coordinates: 41.007708°N 28.976290°E

Architecture
- Type: mosque
- Style: Ottoman
- Creator: Firuz Ağa
- Completed: 1491

Specifications
- Minaret: 1
- Materials: stone

The Firuz Ağa Mosque (Turkish: Firuz Ağa Camii) is a 15th-century Ottoman mosque in the Fatih district of Istanbul, Turkey. It was built by Firuz Ağa, the head treasurer of Sultan Beyazıt II. The marble sarcophagus of Firuz Ağa is located in the mosque complex. The mosque is located in the historical center of the city of Istanbul, on the Divanyolu Street, close to other prominent historical landmarks, Sultanahmet Mosque, Aya Sofya and Basilica Cistern.
