= Monte Aga =

Mountain in Italy

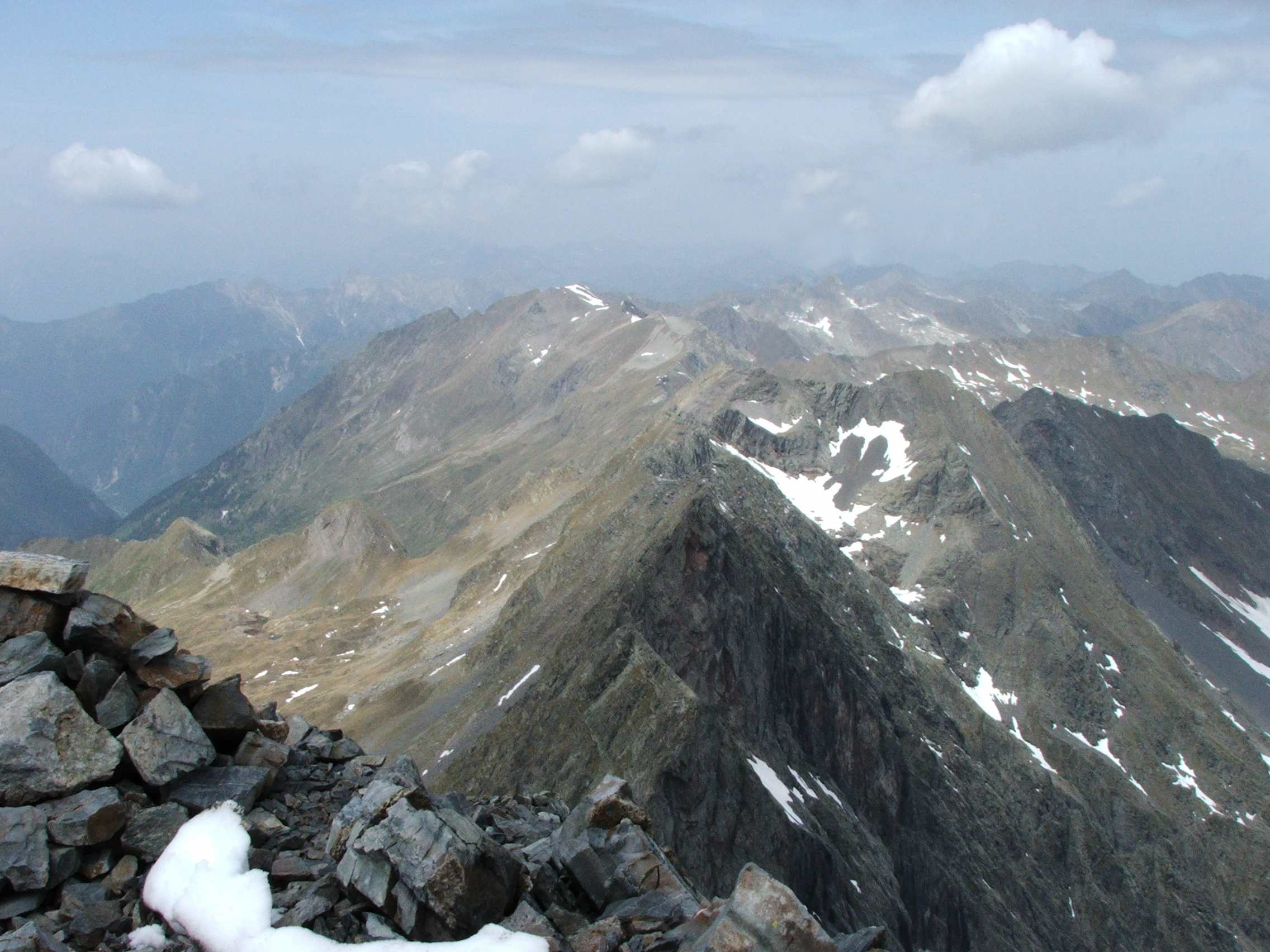

Highest point
- Elevation: 2,720 m (8,920 ft)
- Coordinates: 46°02′49″N 9°52′50″E

Geography
- Location within Italy
- Location: Lombardy, Italy
- Parent range: Bergamo Alps

Monte Aga is a mountain of Lombardy, Italy. It is located within the Bergamo Alps. Hiking is a popular pastime on Monte Aga, up to its peak, and there is a rifugio in the summer season.
