= Agafangel (Savvin) =

Bishop of Ukrainian Orthodox Church (Moscow Patriarchate)

Metropolitan Agafangel of Odesa and Izmail
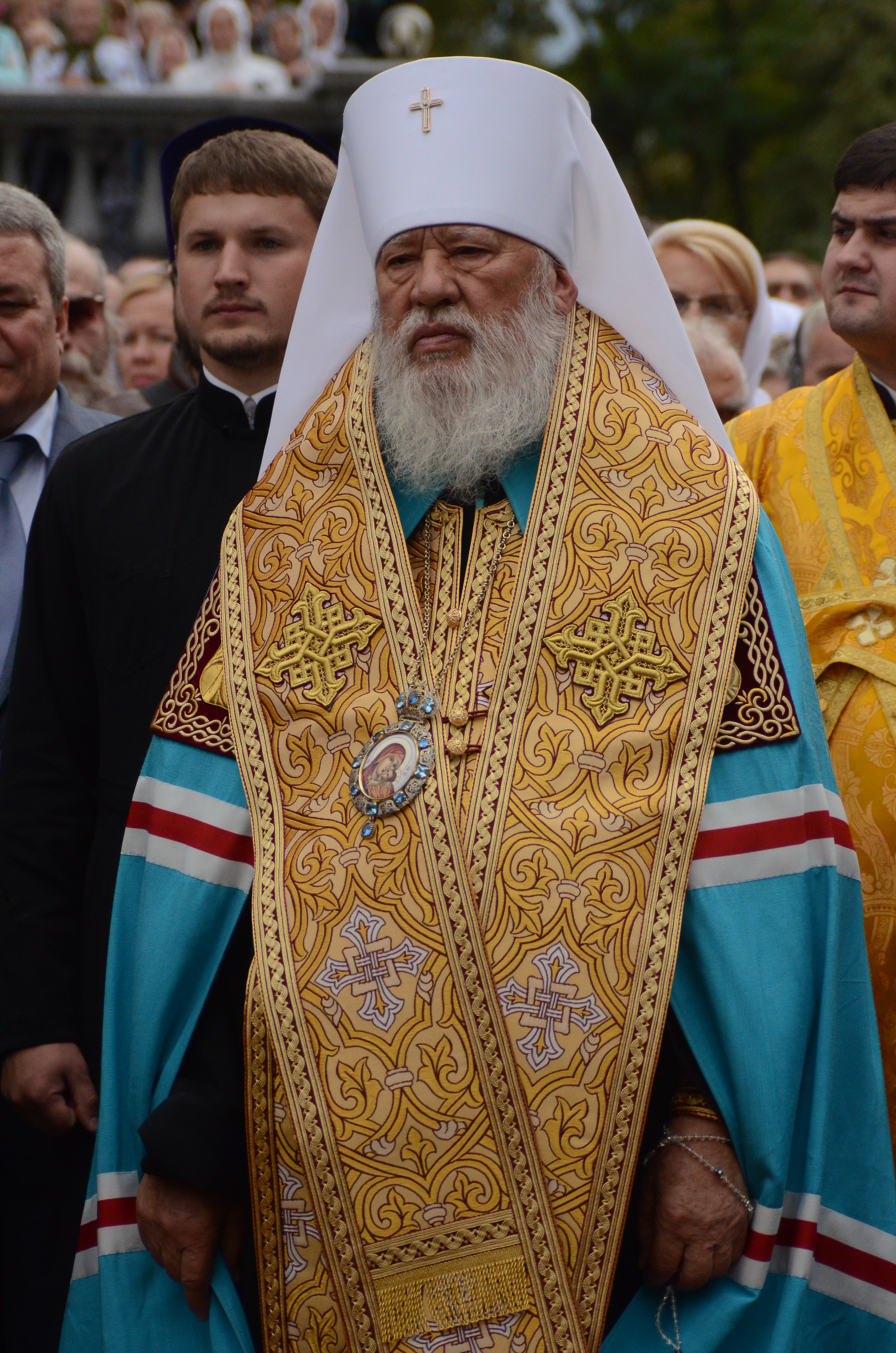
- Agafangel (Savvin) in Donetsk on 19 September 2013
- Native name: Олексій Михайлович Саввін
- Church: Ukrainian Orthodox Church (Moscow Patriarchate)
- Metropolis: Odesa and Izmail
- Elected: 20 June 1992
- In office: 26 July 1992
- Predecessor: Lazar (Svets)

Personal details
- Born: Oleksiy Mykhailovych Savvin; 2 September 1938 (age 88) Burdino, Terbunsky District, Lipetsk Oblast, Russian SFSR, Soviet Union

Metropolitan Agafangel (secular name Олексій Михайлович Саввін; born 2 September 1938), is the Bishop of the Ukrainian Orthodox Church (Moscow Patriarchate), Metropolitan of Odesa and Izmail, elected on 20 June 1992, and is the permanent member of the Holy Synod of the Ukrainian Orthodox Church. He had also served as the Member of the Verkhovna Rada from 1990 to 1992.

== Biography ==
Savvin was born in Burdino in Lipetsk Oblast on 2 September 1938 to a large family of peasants, and is of Russian origin.

From 1942 to 1947, he and his family were evacuated to the city of Oyash in the Novosibirsk Oblast.

In 1956, he graduated from secondary school.

From 1958 to 1960, he studied at the Kyiv Theological Seminary, after its closure he continued his studies at the Odesa Theological Seminary, which he graduated in 1962.

Between 1962 and 1966 he studied at the Moscow Theological Academy, graduating with a candidate of theology degree for his essay “The Idea of Redemption among the Ancient Pagan Peoples and in the Old Testament Religion.”

On 2 April 1965, he accepted monasticism with the name Agafangel and was enrolled among the brothers of the Trinity-Sergius Lavra. On 18 April 1965, he was ordained to the rank of hierodeacon, and on 22 April, he was promoted to the rank of hieromonk.

In 1966, he worked as a senior assistant inspector and taught at the Odesa Theological Seminary.

On 7 April 1967, he was elevated to the rank of abbot, and on 1 June, to the rank of archimandrite.

In 1967, he became the rector of the seminary.

Since January 1968, he was a member of the diocesan council of the Odesa diocese.

In July 1969, he was a member of the delegation of the Russian Orthodox Church at the conference of representatives of all religions of the USSR for cooperation and peace between nations. In September of the same year, he participated in the interviews of theologians of the Russian Orthodox Church and the Evangelical Church of West Germany.

In 1971, he was a member of the Local Council of the Russian Orthodox Church from the Odesa Theological Seminary.

On 11 November 1975, he was inducted the Holy Synod of the Russian Orthodox Church determined to be the Bishop of Vinnytsia and Bratslav.

Since 16 November 1975, the consecration was performed by Metropolitan of Kyiv and Galicia Filaret (Denisenko), Metropolitan of Kherson and Odesa Sergius (Petrov), Archbishop of Chernihiv and Nizhyn Anthony (Vakarik), Bishop of Uman Macarius (Svistun), Bishop of Pereiaslav-Khmelnytskyi Varlaam (Ilyushchenko).

On 7 September 1981, he was elevated to the rank of archbishop, and on 10 March 1989, to the rank of metropolitan.

In 1990, he was dismissed from the administration of the Khmelnytskyi diocese.

== Early politics ==
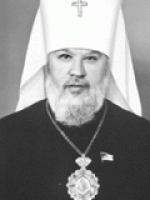
Savvin as a Member of the Verkhovna Rada in 1990

In 1990, the Vinnytsia regional branch of the Soviet Culture Fund nominated him as a candidate for People's Deputies of Ukraine in the Verkhovna Rada. He took part in the elections in Vinnytsia's Old Town electoral district, where he was elected among six candidates in the second round, receiving 57.18% of the votes. On 15 May 1990, he became a People's Deputy of Ukraine of the Verkhovna Rada the 1st convocation. In the parliament, he was a member of the Commission on Village Revival and Social Development.

By decision of the Holy Synod of the UOC MP dated 7 August 1991, he was appointed Metropolitan of Ivano-Frankivsk and Kolomyysk, head of the Ivano-Frankivsk Eparchy of the UOC MP. Metropolitan Agafangel refused to go to Ivano-Frankivsk, so he submitted a request to count him to rest, which was granted by the Synod on 7 September 1991.

After the Bishops' Council of the Russian Orthodox Church, which refused to grant the UOC MP autocephaly while it is headed by Metropolitan Filaret (Denysenko), on April 30, 1992, in Zhytomyr, Metropolitan Agafangel headed the Assembly of representatives of the clergy, monasteries, brotherhoods and believers, which expressed distrust of Metropolitan Filaret of Kyiv, called his oath-breaker and announced the need to convene the Bishops' Council of the UOC MP, which would accept Filaret's resignation and choose a new superior.

Shortly after that, he returned to the post of head of the Vinnytsia Diocese, Metropolitan of Vinnytsia and Bratslav, despite the fact that there was no corresponding decision of the Synod of the Russian Orthodox Church.

After the final split of the UOC MP and the election of Volodymyr (Sabodan) as Metropolitan of Kyiv, by the decision of the Synod of the Russian Orthodox Church dated 20 June 1992, Agafangel was appointed Metropolitan of Odesa and Izmail, the head of the Odesa Diocese of the UOC MP, part of whose faithful were dissatisfied with the pro-Ukrainian policy of the previous Archbishop Lazar. At the same time, Savvin was appointed a permanent member of the Synod.

From 1993 to 1998, he was the rector of the Odesa Theological Seminary.

From 27 August 1995 to 8 May 2008, he was the Chairman of the Educational Committee at the Holy Synod of the UOC.

On 18 February 1997, on the first day of the Bishops' Council of the Russian Orthodox Church 23 February 1997, he was elected chairman of the Credentials Commission.

From 23 December 2011 to 8 May 2012, due to the illness of the Primate of the UOC, Metropolitan Vladimir (Sabodan), as the oldest permanent member of the UOC Synod by consecration, he convened and presided over the meetings of the Holy Synod of the UOC.

== Activity ==
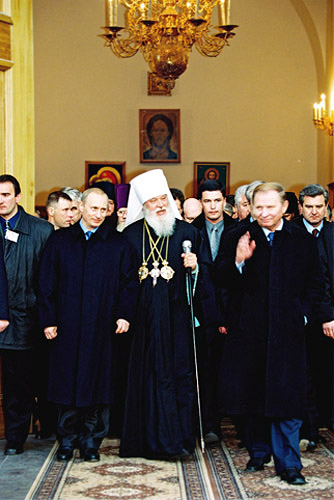
Agafangel (Savvin) with Russian President Vladimir Putin and Ukrainian President Leonid Kuchma on 17 March 2002

During his stay at the Odesa See, the Panteleimonsky, Ilyinsky, Iversky, Konstantino-Eleninsky monasteries, as well as the Mikhailovskaya and Preobrazhenskaya convents were opened. More than 300 churches have been opened in the diocese, about 20 new churches have been built in Odesa and the Odesa region, and new ones are being built. The three-story building of St. Andrew's Metochion in Odesa was returned to the Odesa Metropolis, all previously destroyed bell towers on city churches were restored, and the Transfiguration Cathedral was restored.

On April 30, 1992, in Zhytomyr, under his chairmanship, a meeting of bishops, clergy, monastics, representatives of church fraternities and laity of the Ukrainian Orthodox Church was held, which condemned the then Metropolitan of Kyiv Philaret (Denisenko).

Between 1995 and 1997, upon his proposal, by decision of the Holy Synod of the UOC, the Venerables Kuksha of Odesa, Gabriel of Athos, Jonah of Odesa, as well as Archbishop Innocent (Borisov), Hieromartyr and Confessor Anatoly (Grisyuk), Metropolitan of Kherson and Odesa, were canonized.

Since 2000, on behalf of the Holy Synod of the UOC-MP, he represented the Ukrainian Orthodox Church of the Moscow Patriarchate in negotiations between the Russian Orthodox Church and the Patriarchate of Constantinople to overcome the church schism in Ukraine.

In 2006, he headed the electoral list of the Party of Regions in the Odesa region and was elected to the Odesa Regional Council. At the beginning of March 2014, after the events of early 2014, he resigned as deputy.

At the end of January 2012, in connection with the upcoming elections in Russia, he came out in support of Vladimir Putin as a candidate for the presidency of Russia.

== Political views ==
He positioned himself as a consistent supporter of rapprochement between Ukraine and Russia and an opponent of Ukraine's integration into Europe. In particular, in 2006, he called on the Ukrainian authorities to refuse to join NATO and the European Union, and also to give the Russian language the status of a state language. He motivated his views by the fact that Ukraine's desire for Europe “is another attempt to implement the centuries-old desire of the Protestant-Catholic, Masonic and godless West to tear Ukraine away from unity with the world center of Orthodoxy - Moscow and drag it into the orbit of Western false values, to make it part of the new world system order."

== Political activities and intrigues ==
Despite the fact that the church has no right to interfere in political affairs, Agafangel blessed the activities of the radical pro-Russian public organization "Edynoe Otechestvo" created by Valeriy Kaurov in 2001.

Later, in 2007, he was condemned by the Synod of Bishops of the UOC.

In 2004, during the Orange Revolution, he supported Viktor Yanukovych.

Viktor Fedorovych Yanukovych is a person deservedly elected by the people of Ukraine. He became the leader of the Ukrainian state and today we support him as the legally elected president of our country.

— Savvin at the rally on 23 November 2004 in Odesa

In 2006 and 2010, Metropolitan Agafangel headed the list of the Party of Regions in the elections to the Odesa Regional Council, twice becoming its deputy.

On 27 July 2009, he was appointed a member of the Inter-Catholic Presence of the Russian Orthodox Church.

Due to the fact that at these meetings, Archbishop of Pereyaslav-Khmelnytskyi Oleksandr (Drabinka), the secretary and "right hand" of Metropolitan Volodymyr, was dismissed from several of the most influential positions in the UOC, the mass media and independent observers accused a group of permanent members of the Synod as part of Metropolitans of Vyshgorod Pavlo (Lebedya ) and Hilarion of Donetsk (Shukal) led by Agafangel in an attempt to remove its superior from the practical management of the church, take power into his own hands and eliminate the independence of the UOC.

Due to the illness of the superior, Agafangel also led the traditional thanksgiving prayer on Volodymyr Hill in 2011 with the participation of the country's highest officials.

In October 2020, he banned Viktor Kochmar, a priest of the Odesa Diocese, from his ministry for participating in local elections as a candidate of the OTG.

== Odesa diocese under the leadership of Agafangel ==
During the stay of Metropolitan Agafangel at the Odesa Cathedral, 7 new monasteries were opened in the diocese: Panteleimonivskyi, Illinskyi, Iverskyi, Konstantino-Yelenivskyi and Mykolaivskyi for men, Michaelivskyi and Spaso-Preobrazhenskyi for women. More than 300 churches have been opened in the diocese, and the Transfiguration Cathedral has been restored. The building of the Andriivskyi Athos courtyard in Odesa was returned to the diocesan administration.

In 1995 to 1997, at the request of Metropolitan Agafangel, the Holy Synod of the Ukrainian Orthodox Church canonized monks Kuksha of Odesa, Gabriel of Athos, righteous Ion of Odesa, Archbishop Innokenty (Borisov), holy martyr Anatoly (Hrysyuk).

The Odesa diocese, headed by Agafangel, is one of the few in the UOC (MP) that has not been divided for a long time since Ukraine gained independence.

Due to the efforts of Metropolitan Agafangel, the activity of the Bessarabian Metropolis of the Romanian Orthodox Church, which claims canonical jurisdiction over the region, was not extended to the Odesa Oblast.

In May 2015, employees of the Security Service of Ukraine conducted a search in one of Odesa's recreation areas, where Dmytro P., an employee of the Odesa diocese of the UOC (MP), who also works as a journalist on the Odesa TV channel and is an assistant to one of the people's deputies, was celebrating his 25th birthday. . The citizen invited his colleagues from the Odesa Diocese of the Ukrainian Orthodox Church to the party: seminarians of the Odesa and Kyiv Theological Academy and Seminary (UPC of the Ukrainian Orthodox Church of Ukraine) and clergy of the Ukrainian Orthodox Church of Ukraine (UOC). The guests presented the culprit of the celebration with a large cake with the image of the emblem and flag of the terrorist organization "DNR", as well as the flag of Russia. In response, the man set the table with expensive imported drinks and invited to the holiday a dozen girls who provide intimate services, who were immigrants from the occupied Donbas. During the search, SBU officers seized a 5.45-caliber pistol and cartridges from one of the guests.

== Criticisms ==
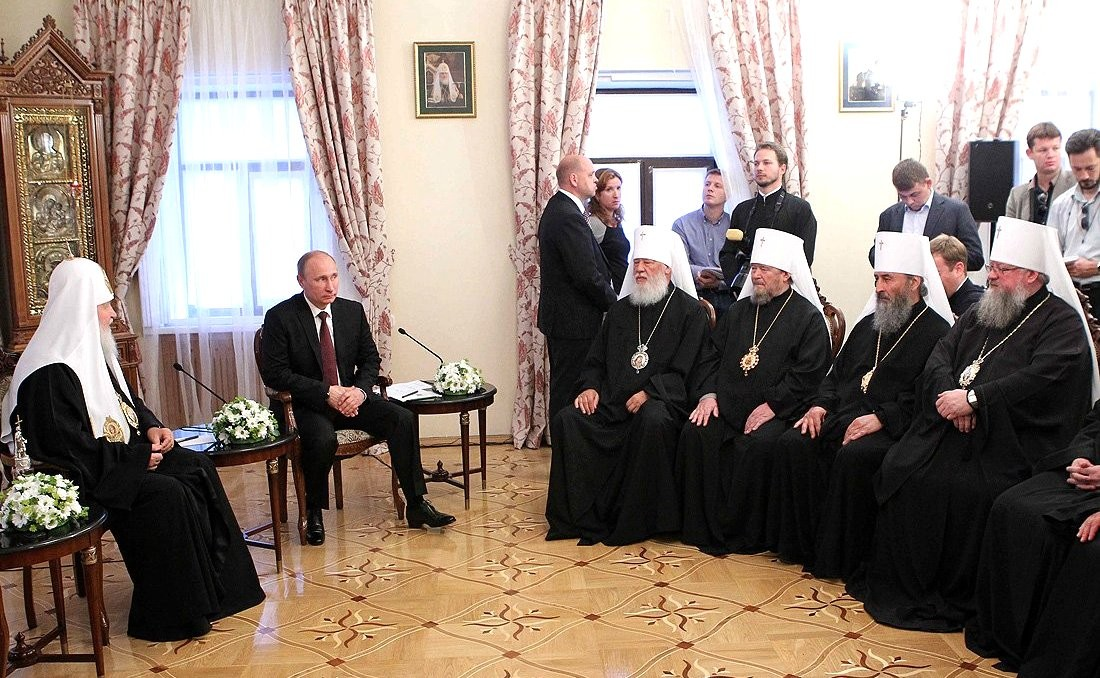
Arafangel (Savvin) and other Bishops with Russian president Vladimir Putin in 2013

His Eminence is accused of pro-Russian and, in some places, even chauvinistic views:

Agafangel's nationalism is a chauvinistic black-hundred-year-old newspaper "Nabat", which is distributed in Odesa churches. These are radical statements against everything Ukrainian, this is even a denial of the term "Ukraine", and instead the use of such a favorite for chauvinists - "Little Russia"

— Andrii Yurash accuses Agafangel

Protodeacon of the ROC Andriy Kuraev accuses Agafangel of unconventional orientation.

Agafangel is a supporter of the concept "Moscow is the Third Rome" and the concept "Russian Peace" proposed by Patriarch Kirill of Moscow.

The need for the consolidation of Orthodox states is long overdue. First of all, the union with Russia of Ukraine, Belarus, Central Asian and Caucasian peoples, which were previously part of the Russian Empire, is necessary. Eventually, the Balkan states and Greece may join this block of states.

— Savvin in March 2004

He is a categorical opponent of Ukraine's integration into the European Union and NATO.

Metropolitan Agafangel is a staunch supporter of the Transnistrian separatists in Moldova.

The Metropolitan is an opponent of globalization and ecumenism, believing that they need to be opposed with the help of the purity of faith and the preservation of traditions: the Julian calendar, fasting and the Church Slavonic language.

Bishop Agafangel is also a categorical opponent of the declaration of canonical autocephaly of the Ukrainian Orthodox Church.

According to the holy canons, no "unification" with the "UPC KP" or "UAPC" is possible. It is only possible for schismatics to join the canonical Church. And for this, the Ukrainian Orthodox Church does not need to fulfill the demands of schismatics and nationalist politicians, severing the sacred, God-given unity with the Russian Orthodox Church, but the schismatics themselves need to humbly accept the teachings, practices and ecclesiastical structure of the Mother Church.

— Savvin on the Ukrainian Orthodox Church

Agafangel is known for his intransigence towards opponents. He is credited with saying that "Lviv is our Chechnya."

The reaction of the leadership of the Odessa diocese to the article in the Segodnya newspaper gained some publicity about the price list of church services. As reported by the official website of the diocese, whose editor-in-chief is the metropolitan, "from now on in the Holy Dormition Patriarchal Odesa, Holy Panteleimon, Holy Illina and Holy Iversky men's monasteries, they will pray for the Lord to remind them of the sorrows and illnesses of the embittered, maddened slanderers on Christ and His Holy Church", i.e. female journalists of the newspaper.

In 2021, giving an interview to the pro-Russian media Vesta, he said that God "will not forgive" and "punish" the defenders of Odesa, who defended it in 2014.
