= Aegea =

Mythological queen of the Amazons

Aegea is a back-formation from "Aegean", the sea that was named after an eponymous Aegeus in early levels of Greek mythology. The Encyclopædia Britannica (1911) mentioned an Aegea, queen of the Amazons, as an alternative eponym of the Aegean Sea. Legend says she commanded an army of Amazon women warriors that traveled from Libya to Asia Minor to fight at Troy, and that she perished at sea with her army.

Modern Italian has the adjective Egea ("Aegean"), but Classical Latin had none. Modern botanical Latin sometimes uses the specific epithet aegea to mean "of the Aegean".
