= Burdino =

Burdino Бурдино
- Village
- Location within Perm Krai Location within Russia
- Coordinates: 57°36′N 54°51′E
- Country: Russia
- Region: Perm Krai
- District: Bolshesosnovsky District
- Time zone: UTC+5:00

Burdino (Russian: Бурдино) is a rural locality (a village) in Levinskoye Rural Settlement, Bolshesosnovsky District, Perm Krai, Russia. The population was 79 as of 2010. There are 4 streets.

== Geography ==
Burdino is located 24 km southeast of Bolshaya Sosnova (the district's administrative centre) by road. Dolgany is the nearest rural locality.
