= Ağa =

Surname list

Ağa is a Turkish surname. Notable people with the surname include:

- Mustapha Aga, Ottoman Empire ambassador to the Swedish Court
- Osman Aga of Temesvar, Ottoman army officer
- Sedefkar Mehmed Agha, Ottoman architect of the Sultan Ahmed Mosque
- Suleiman Aga, Ottoman Empire ambassador to the French king Louis XIV
- Silahdar Findiklili Mehmed Aga, Turkish historian
- Yakup Ağa, Ottoman cavalry knight
- Zaro Aga, claimed to be one of the longest-lived humans in the history of mankind
- Receb Ağa, Ottoman general

== See also ==
- Firuz Ağa Mosque
- Agha (Ottoman Empire)
