= Agavva =

Agavva (Russian: Ага́вва) is an old and rare Russian Christian male first name. It is supposedly derived from the Biblical Hebrew word hāgāb, meaning locust.

Its diminutives are Aga (А́га), Agakha (Ага́ха), and Agasha (Ага́ша).

The patronymics derived from "Agavva" are "Ага́ввич" (Agavvich; masculine) and "Ага́ввична" (Agavvichna; feminine).

== See also ==
- Agav
