= Ryan Gingeras =

American historian (born 1978)

Ryan Gingeras (born 1978) is an American historian. He is a professor at the Naval Postgraduate School in California and a historian of the late Ottoman Empire.

He is the author of five books, including Eternal Dawn: Turkey in the Age of Ataturk and Sorrowful Shores: Violence, Ethnicity, and the End of the Ottoman Empire and Mafia: A Global History. He has published on a wide variety of topics related to history and politics in such publications as Foreign Affairs, New York Times, International Journal of Middle East Studies, Middle East Journal, Iranian Studies, Past & Present, and War on the Rocks.

Gingeras stated that he wanted to write his dissertation about Kars during World War I, or how Nakhichevan became part of Azerbaijan, but was warned that writing about controversial topics such as Kurds and Armenians would be akin to "professional suicide".

== Works ==
- Gingeras, Ryan (2009). Sorrowful Shores: Violence, Ethnicity, and the End of the Ottoman Empire 1912-1923. Oxford University Press. ISBN 978-0-19-160979-4.
- Gingeras, Ryan (2014). Heroin, Organized Crime, and the Making of Modern Turkey. Oxford University Press. ISBN 978-0-19-871602-0.
- Gingeras, Ryan (22 September 2015). Mustafa Kemal Atatürk: Heir to an Empire. Oxford University Press. ISBN 9780190250010.
- Gingeras, Ryan (2016). Fall of the Sultanate: The Great War and the End of the Ottoman Empire, 1908-1922. Oxford University Press. ISBN 978-0-19-967607-1.
- Gingeras, Ryan (2019). Eternal Dawn: Turkey in the Age of Atatürk. Oxford University Press. ISBN 978-0-19-879121-8.
- Gingeras, Ryan (12 March 2024). The Last Days of the Ottoman Empire. Penguin UK. ISBN 9780141992778.
- Gingeras, Ryan (2026). Mafia: A Global History. Simon & Schuster. ISBN 978-1-39-853165-9.
