= Agav =

Agav (Russian: Ага́в) is an old and uncommon Russian Christian male first name. There are several theories about the origins of this first name. According to one, the name is possibly derived from the Greek word agauos, meaning famous, celebrated. It is also possible that the name is of Biblical Hebrew origins and derives from the word hāgāb, meaning locust. Finally, it could have been derived from the name of an Ethiopian tribe.

Its diminutives are Aga (А́га), Agava (Ага́ва), Agakha (Ага́ха), and Agasha (Ага́ша).

The patronymics derived from "Agav" are "Ага́вович" (Agavovich; masculine) and "Ага́вовна" (Agavovna; feminine).
