= Circassian verbs =

Verb system of the Circassian languages

In the Circassian languages — Adyghe (West Circassian) and Kabardian (East Circassian) — as in all Northwest Caucasian languages, the verb is the most inflected part of speech. Verbs are typically head final and are conjugated for tense, person, number, and more. Some Circassian verbs are morphologically simple, consisting of a single morpheme (Adyghe кӀо / Kabardian кӀуэ "go"; Adyghe штэ / Kabardian щтэ "take"). In general, however, Circassian verbs are structurally and semantically complex. The morphological structure of a verb includes prefixes and suffixes that express subject, direct and indirect object, adverbial, number, negation, mood, direction, mutuality, compatibility, and reflexivity, so that a single verb can amount to a whole sentence. For example, Adyghe уакъыдэсэгъэгущыӀэжьы / Kabardian уакъыдэсогъэпсэлъэжы "I am forcing you to talk to them again" breaks down as "you (у) with them (а) from there (къы) together (дэ) I (сэ/со) am forcing (гъэ) to speak (гущыӀэн/псэлъэн) again (жьы/жы)".

This article describes the verb system of both varieties together, noting differences between Adyghe and Kabardian where they occur.

Colour legend for arguments:

- Absolutive (Abs): marks the subject of intransitive verbs and the direct object of transitive verbs.
- Ergative (Erg): marks the subject (agent) of transitive verbs.
- Oblique (Obl): marks indirect objects.

== Structure of the verbal complex ==
The verbal word in Circassian consists of both prefixes and suffixes arranged in a rigid sequence of slots relative to the root, numbered from −12 (leftmost prefix) to +7 (rightmost suffix). An argument-structure zone of prefixes cross-references the verb's absolutive, oblique and ergative participants; these are followed by pre-stem elements and a series of suffixes marking aspect, tense, mood and negation. The slot template is essentially identical in the two languages, with two differences: Kabardian fills the −11 slot with both a cislocative (къ-) and a translocative (ны-) marker where Adyghe has only the cislocative, and the actual phonological shapes of the markers differ (e.g. tense and mood suffixes).

=== Slot template (overview) ===
Order of slots in the verb (negative = prefix, 0 = root, positive = suffix)
Prefixes												Root	Suffixes						
−12	−11	−10	−9	−8	−7	−6	−5	−4	−3	−2	−1	0	+1	+2	+3	+4	+5	+6	+7
Abs	Cisl (/Transl)	Manner/ Fact	IO (Obl)	Appl	Loc	Prep	Agt (Erg)	Dyn	Opt (/Juss)	Neg	Caus	√ ROOT	Rep	Pot	Tense	Real	Pl	Dyn	Mood/ Neg

=== Markers filling each slot ===
Where Adyghe and Kabardian share a marker the two columns are merged into one; where they differ, the Adyghe form is given first and the Kabardian second.

Markers filling each slot of the Circassian verb
Slot	Category	Adyghe	Kabardian	Gloss / meaning
−12	Absolutive	с-		1SG
−12	Absolutive	у-		2SG
−12	Absolutive	т-	д-	1PL
−12	Absolutive	шъу-	ф-	2PL
−12	Absolutive	∅		3 (no overt marker)
−11	Cislocative (/ Translocative)	къ-		hither (cislocative)
−11	Cislocative (/ Translocative)	—	ны-	toward (translocative; Kabardian only)
−10	Manner / Factive	зэрэ-	зэры-	the way that…; factive
−9	Indirect object (Oblique)	с-		1SG
−9	Indirect object (Oblique)	у-, п-		2SG
−9	Indirect object (Oblique)	т-	д-	1PL
−9	Indirect object (Oblique)	шъу-	ф-	2PL
−9	Indirect object (Oblique)	е-		3SG
−9	Indirect object (Oblique)	а-, я-		3PL
−8	Applicative	фэ-	хуэ-	for (benefactive)
−8	Applicative	шӀо-	фӀэ-	against (malefactive)
−8	Applicative	дэ-		with (comitative)
−7	Locative	щы-		at
−6	Prepositional (locative preverbs)	те-		on
−6	Prepositional (locative preverbs)	чӀэ-	щӀэ-	under
−6	Prepositional (locative preverbs)	хэ-		within / among
−6	Prepositional (locative preverbs)	дэ-		in
−6	Prepositional (locative preverbs)	пы-		on / attached to
−6	Prepositional (locative preverbs)	и-		in(side)
−6	Prepositional (locative preverbs)	къо-	къуэ-	behind
−6	Prepositional (locative preverbs)	Ӏу-		at / near
−6	Prepositional (locative preverbs)	го-	гуэ-	beside
−6	Prepositional (locative preverbs)	кӀоцӀы-	кӀуэцӀы-	within / inside
−5	Agent (Ergative)	с-		1SG
−5	Agent (Ergative)	у-		2SG
−5	Agent (Ergative)	т-	д-	1PL
−5	Agent (Ergative)	шъу-	ф-	2PL
−5	Agent (Ergative)	е-	и-	3SG
−5	Agent (Ergative)	а-, я-		3PL
−4	'Dynamic' prefix	мэ-		3rd person
−4	'Dynamic' prefix	э-	о-	positive present
−3	Optative (/ Jussive)	рэ-		optative (Kabardian also jussive)
−2	Negation	мы-		negation (NEG)
−1	Causative	гъэ-		causative (CAUS)
0	Root	[verb]		verb stem
+1	Repetition	-жь	-ж	again (re-)
+2	Potential	-шъу	-ф	can / be able to
+3	Tense	-гъэ	-ащ	past (PST)
+3	Tense	-щт	-ну	future (FUT)
+3	Tense	-щтыгъ	-(р)т	imperfect (IMPF)
+3	Tense	-гъагъ	-ат	past perfect (PP)
+4	Realization / Completion	-х		realization / completion
+5	Plural	-х	-хэ	3rd person plural absolutive (PL)
+6	Dynamic suffix	-рэ		dynamic suffix
+7	Mood / Negation	-п	-къым	negative (NEG)
+7	Mood / Negation	-мэ		conditional (COND)
+7	Mood / Negation	-ми		concessive (CONC)
+7	Mood / Negation	-а / -ба	-къэ	(negative) interrogative (Q / NEG.Q)
+7	Mood / Negation	-и		and (additive)
+7	Mood / Negation	-эу	-у	adverbial (ADV)

== Transitivity and valency ==
Verbs in Circassian can be ditransitive, transitive or intransitive. By valency (the number of arguments they require) they fall into four main types: monovalent intransitive, bivalent intransitive, bivalent transitive, and trivalent ditransitive.

A fundamental rule is that a verb can contain at most three arguments: one absolutive (marked -р), one ergative (marked -м), and one oblique (marked -м). The ergative and oblique share the suffix -м; they are told apart by the verb's transitivity and by word order, not by the ending. Beyond these four types there are labile (ambitransitive) verbs, where the direct object of the transitive use corresponds to the subject of the intransitive use, and causative verbs, which raise valency.

=== Monovalent intransitive verbs ===
A monovalent intransitive verb has no direct object; its single argument — the subject — stands in the absolutive case (-р).

Language	Example	Gloss	Translation
Adyghe	ЛӀыр мэчъые	Man-ABS sleeps	"The man is sleeping."
Kabardian	ЛӀыр мэжей	Man-ABS sleeps	"The man is sleeping."
Adyghe	ПэсакӀор макӀо	Guard-ABS goes	"The security guard is going."
Kabardian	ПэсакӀуэр макӀуэ	Guard-ABS goes	"The security guard is going."

In an intransitive verb the absolutive subject is the participant undergoing change (created, altered, moved or ended), e.g. Kabardian ЩӀалэр макӀуэ "the boy is going" (the boy changes by moving).

=== Bivalent intransitive verbs ===
Intransitive verbs may also take an indirect object: the subject stays absolutive (-р), while the indirect object (target, source or location) takes the oblique case (-м). A verb such as Circassian еуэн "to hit" describes the motion of hitting rather than the impact, so its target is oblique rather than a changed (absolutive) object.

Language	Example	Gloss	Translation
Adyghe	КӀалэр тхылъым еджэ	Boy-ABS book-OBL reads	"The boy reads the book."
Kabardian	ЩӀалэр тхылъым йоджэ	Boy-ABS book-OBL reads	"The boy reads the book."
Adyghe	КӀалэр пшъашъэм ебэу	Boy-ABS girl-OBL kisses	"The boy kisses the girl."
Kabardian	ЩӀалэр пщащэм йобэу	Boy-ABS girl-OBL kisses	"The boy kisses the girl."

=== Bivalent transitive verbs ===
In a transitive clause the subject (agent) is ergative (-м) and the direct object absolutive (-р); the agent causes a change to the object.

Language	Example	Gloss	Translation
Adyghe	КӀалэм письмэр етхы	Boy-ERG letter-ABS writes	"The boy is writing the letter."
Kabardian	ЩӀалэм письмор етх	Boy-ERG letter-ABS writes	"The boy is writing the letter."
Adyghe	Хьэм тхьакӀумкӀыхьэр къыубытыгъ	Dog-ERG hare-ABS caught	"The dog has caught the hare."
Kabardian	Хьэм тхьакӀумкӀыхьыр къиубыдащ	Dog-ERG hare-ABS caught	"The dog has caught the hare."

The distinction between intransitive and transitive verbs matters because case and person-marking depend on it. In Kabardian, for example, елъэгъун "to see" is transitive while еплъын "to look at" is intransitive, so ЩӀалэм пщащэр йолъэгъу means "the boy sees the girl" but ЩӀалэм пщащэр йоплъ means "the girl is looking at the boy", even though "boy" carries the same -м.

=== Trivalent ditransitive verbs ===
Ditransitive verbs involve three participants: an ergative agent (-м), an absolutive theme (-р), and an oblique recipient or goal (-м).

Language	Example	Gloss	Translation
Adyghe	КӀалэм мыӀэрысэр пшъашъэм реты	Boy-ERG apple-ABS girl-OBL gives	"The boy gives the apple to the girl."
Kabardian	ЩӀалэм мыӀэрысэр пщащэм ирет	Boy-ERG apple-ABS girl-OBL gives	"The boy gives the apple to the girl."
Adyghe	ЛӀым мыжъор хым хедзэ	Man-ERG rock-ABS sea-OBL throws-into	"The man throws the rock into the sea."
Kabardian	ЛӀым мывэр хым хедзэ	Man-ERG rock-ABS sea-OBL throws-into	"The man throws the rock into the sea."

=== Active and antipassive voice ===
Monovalent intransitive verbs split into two voices. Active intransitive verbs keep the patient/undergoer in the absolutive, whereas antipassive verbs keep the actor/agent in the absolutive (the usual object having been dropped). The contrast is visible with Adyghe укъэбзын "to clean":

укъэбзын "to clean" (Adyghe)
Voice	Example	Translation
Active transitive	КӀалэм унэр еукъэбзы.	"The boy cleans the house."
Active intransitive	Унэр мэукъэбзы.	"The house becomes clean." (agent dropped)
Antipassive intransitive	КӀалэр мэукъабзэ.	"The boy cleans." (object dropped)

The same symmetry appears with the root "to write" (Circassian тхын), where the antipassive матхэ "(s)he writes" is heavily used. The full three-way system survives only in certain dialects; in the standard languages most roots show only two of the three forms.

=== Valency increase ===
Some verbs shift between monovalent, bivalent and trivalent forms without marking. Valency can also be raised explicitly with the causative affix -гъэ- ("to make, force"), with prepositional preverbs (e.g. Adyghe/Kabardian хэ- "into", те- "on"), and with applicative prefixes (benefactive, malefactive, comitative). Because a verb has only one oblique slot, each can be added only when that slot is free. The causative fills in the "missing" argument:

Language	Base	Causative	Translation
Adyghe	КӀалэр мачъэ (ABS VERB)	ЛӀым кӀалэр егъачъэ (ERG ABS VERB)	"The boy runs." → "The man makes the boy run."
Kabardian	ЩӀалэр мажэ	ЛӀым щӀалэр егъажэ	"The boy runs." → "The man makes the boy run."
Adyghe	КӀалэр пшъашъэм еплъы (ABS OBL VERB)	ЛӀым кӀалэр пшъашъэм регъэплъы (ERG ABS OBL VERB)	"The boy looks at the girl." → "The man makes the boy look at the girl."
Kabardian	ЩӀалэр пщащэм йоплъ	ЛӀым щӀалэр пщащэм регъэплъ	"The boy looks at the girl." → "The man makes the boy look at the girl."

When the causative applies to a bivalent transitive, the original ergative agent is demoted into the free oblique slot and a new causer enters as the ergative subject.

== Verb conjugation ==
Both languages have highly polysynthetic verbal morphology: a single verb can encode all of its arguments — subject, direct object, and indirect object — through an ordered sequence of personal prefixes attached to the root.

=== Person markers ===
Circassian has a strict ergative–absolutive alignment. There are three core cases, each with its own series of personal prefixes:

- Absolutive — the single argument (S) of an intransitive verb and the direct object (P) of a transitive verb.
- Ergative — the subject (A) of a transitive verb.
- Oblique — indirect objects (recipients, addressees) and the obligatory objects of bivalent intransitive verbs (e.g. "to look at", "to wait for").

The same person can therefore appear on the verb in up to three different shapes depending on its syntactic role.

Adyghe personal prefixes
Person	Absolutive	Ergative	Oblique
1SG (I / me)	сы-	с-	сэ-
2SG (you)	у- / п-	бэ- / о-	о-
3SG (he / she / it)	Ø	ы-	е- / ы-
1PL (we / us)	ты-	т-	тэ-
2PL (y'all)	шъу-	шъу-	шъо-
3PL (they / them)	Ø … -х	а-	а-

Kabardian personal prefixes
Person	Absolutive	Ergative	Oblique
1SG (I / me)	сы-	с- (~з-)	сэ- / къызэ-
2SG (you)	у-	п- / б- / у-	уэ-
3SG (he / she / it)	Ø	и- (past) / е- (present)	е- / йо-
1PL (we / us)	ды-	т- (~д-)	дэ-
2PL (y'all)	фы-	ф- (~в-)	вэ- / фо-
3PL (they / them)	Ø … -хэ	а- / я-	е- (see note)

In both languages the 3rd person singular absolutive is a zero-morpheme (Ø), with plurality shown by a suffix (Adyghe -х, Kabardian -хэ). In some present-tense intransitive verbs a "dynamic" prefix (Adyghe мэ-, Kabardian мэ-/-о-) appears for the 3rd person; this is a tense/aspect marker, not a pronoun.

Which case a verb uses depends on its valency and transitivity:

Case alignment by verb class
Verb class	Subject	Direct object	Indirect / oblique object	Person markers
Monovalent intransitive	Absolutive	—	—	1
Bivalent intransitive	Absolutive	—	Oblique	2
Bivalent transitive	Ergative	Absolutive	—	2
Trivalent ditransitive	Ergative	Absolutive	Oblique	3

==== A key difference: 3PL oblique in bivalent intransitives ====
Adyghe explicitly distinguishes singular and plural 3rd-person oblique objects: Сеплъы "I look at him" vs. Саплъы "I look at them" (present), Сеплъыгъ vs. Саплъыгъ (past). Kabardian does not make this distinction in the bivalent intransitive class: the 3PL oblique object uses the same prefix as the 3SG, namely е- (with allomorphs йо- / о-), and plurality of the oblique is left unmarked. Thus Kabardian Соплъ means both "I look at him" and "I look at them", and Йоплъ both "he looks at him" and "he looks at them". The я-/а- prefix is used in Kabardian, but only in transitive verbs (e.g. лъагъун "to see", 3PL ergative я-).

=== Verb template ===
Every Circassian verb is built around an ordered sequence of prefix slots before the root, plus tense/mood suffixes after it. A fundamental rule is that the 3rd person singular absolutive ("he/she/it") is a zero-morpheme (∅-); when a slot's argument is 3SG, the slot is simply empty.

Circassian verb template at a glance
Slot 1	Slot 2	Slot 3	Slot 4	Slot 5	Slot 6	Slot 7
ABS	DIR (Ady. къы-/къэ-, Kab. къы-/нэ-)	OBL	ERG	DYN (Ady. э-/мэ-, Kab. -о-)	Root	TNS (Ady. -гъ, Kab. -ащ, …)

Function of the slots
Slot	Abbr.	Function
1	ABS	Absolutive — intransitive subject or transitive direct object
2	DIR	Directional — cislocative "toward me / a reference point"; optional
3	OBL	Oblique / indirect object
4	ERG	Ergative — agent (subject) of a transitive verb
5	DYN	Dynamic — present-tense vowel (Adyghe э-, Kabardian -о-)
6	Root	The verb stem
7	TNS	Tense/aspect suffix; the present carries no suffix and is signalled by the dynamic prefix in slot 5

The case slots stay constant between present and past; only the tense suffix changes. For instance, monovalent Сэплъэ / Сыплъагъ "I look / I looked" (Adyghe), Kabardian Соплъэ / Сыплъащ; trivalent Сыуеты / Сыуетыгъ "he gives / gave me to you" (Adyghe), Kabardian Сыует / Сыуетащ.

=== Morphophonology (Kabardian) ===
Because of the highly agglutinative structure, Kabardian person markers undergo regular phonological changes:

- Voicing assimilation: prefixes adopt the voicing of the following consonant, e.g. Птхащ "you wrote it" (2SG /w/ + /t/ → п), Здзащ "I threw it" (1SG /s/ + /dz/ → з).
- Intervocalic voicing: voiceless prefixes voice between vowels, e.g. Узолъагъу "I see you" (1SG с- → з-), but stay voiceless word-initially.
- 2SG hardening: the underlying 2SG /w/ (written у) hardens to п- before voiceless consonants and б- before the dynamic -о-, e.g. Ибот "you give it to him", Ептащ "you gave it to him". The sequence ы-у typically contracts to о (e.g. Къоплъ "he looks at you").

Adyghe shows comparable but lighter morphophonology; notably the 2SG ergative is standard -о- in the literary language, while many dialects also allow word-medial -бэ- (e.g. Сэолъэгъу = dialectal Сэбэлъэгъу).

=== Monovalent intransitive verbs ===
A monovalent intransitive verb has a single argument — its absolutive subject — so only one personal prefix appears. The example is "to look" (Circassian плъэн). The 3rd person carries the dynamic prefix (Adyghe мэ-, Kabardian ма-), which drops in the past; the past suffix is Adyghe -гъ / Kabardian -ащ.

Monovalent intransitive плъэн (to look), present and past
Subject (Abs)	Adyghe		Kabardian	
Subject (Abs)	Present	Past	Present	Past
I	Сэплъэ	Сыплъагъ	Соплъэ	Сыплъащ
You	Оплъэ	Уплъагъ	Уоплъэ	Уплъащ
He/she	Мэплъэ	Плъагъэ	Маплъэ	Плъащ
We	Тэплъэ	Тыплъагъ	Доплъэ	Дыплъащ
Y'all	Шъоплъэ	Шъуплъагъ	Фоплъэ	Фыплъащ
They	Мэплъэх	Плъагъэх	Маплъэхэ	Плъахэщ

=== Intransitive bivalent verbs ===
A bivalent intransitive verb takes an absolutive subject and an oblique object, in the order [Subject (Abs)] – (optional cislocative) – [Object (Obl)] – [Root]. The canonical example is "to look at" (Circassian еплъын). In Adyghe the optional cislocative къы- adds "toward me / a reference point"; in Kabardian the dynamic -о- is visible in most cells. The Adyghe paradigm distinguishes 3SG and 3PL oblique objects ("at him" vs "at them"), which the standard Kabardian paradigm collapses.

==== The directional prefix and the person hierarchy ====
The directional (cislocative) къы- does not appear at random: it tracks a person hierarchy, 1st ≥ 2nd > 3rd. The ranking mirrors how central each person is to the act of speaking. The 1st person (the speaker) is the natural deictic centre, since one normally speaks from one's own point of view. The 2nd person (the addressee) comes next: present in the conversation and the one being spoken to, so when the talk turns to them the centre readily shifts onto them. The 3rd person, absent from the exchange, is the least central. This is why 1st and 2nd sit together at the top (1st ≥ 2nd) while the 3rd trails behind.

"Come" vs. "go". The cislocative къы- is essentially the grammar of "come" — orientation toward the deictic centre — while its absence is "go", away from it. English shows the same instinct in its choice of verb: one says "I'll come to you", not "I'll go to you", and "you come to me" — movement between speaker and addressee is always "come". Circassian generalises this: because къы- can attach to any verb, the "come/go" contrast surfaces on every verb, not just verbs of motion. An action running between 1st and 2nd person — in either direction — therefore patterns as "come" and takes къы-, and that mutual "come" is exactly why the two tie (1st ≥ 2nd, not 1st > 2nd). Toward a mere 3rd person English prefers "go" ("I go to him", "you go to him"), and Circassian likewise leaves the 1st/2nd → 3rd forms bare; but a 3rd person acting back on the speaker or addressee moves toward the centre — "come" — and so takes къы-.

Stated as one rule: the cislocative appears whenever the object stands no lower than the subject on 1st ≥ 2nd > 3rd — the whole 1st↔2nd zone, plus every "inverse" case in which a lower person acts on a higher one (3rd→1st, 3rd→2nd, 2nd→1st). In this oblique-object class the pattern is semi-mandatory: the bare form is dispreferred in those cells, while the "outbound" cells (1st/2nd → 3rd, and a 3rd person on a distinct 3rd) stay bare by default.

The cislocative (CISL) and the hierarchy 1st ≥ 2nd > 3rd in the bivalent intransitive
Subject ↓	Object →		
Subject ↓	1st	2nd	3rd
1st	—	+CISL	−CISL
2nd	+CISL	—	−CISL
3rd	+CISL	+CISL	−CISL

+CISL (red) = the cislocative is (semi-)obligatory (the "come" cells); −CISL (yellow) = the plain outbound form, no къы- (the "go" cells). The 1st→1st and 2nd→2nd cells are greyed because a speaker or addressee acting on itself is reflexive (formed separately with зэ-/зы-); a 3rd person acting on a distinct 3rd person ("he looks at him") is the ordinary direct form and stays bare. In Kabardian the 1st→2nd cell is filled by the translocative н(ы)- instead of the cislocative (see below).

The two languages differ in the 1st→2nd cell. Adyghe uses the cislocative къы- in both directions of the 1st↔2nd zone (Сыкъыоплъы "I look at you", Укъысэплъы "you look at me"). Kabardian keeps the cislocative for the inbound 2nd→1st (Укъызоплъ) but marks the outbound 1st→2nd with the mirror-image translocative н(ы)- ("away"), Сыноплъ "I look at you" — making the "go" orientation of that single cell explicit while still marking it overtly.

Because this is orientation and not rigid agreement, a speaker can override it to shift the centre onto a 3rd person: adding къы- to an otherwise outbound form recentres the scene on that 3rd party. So beside the default Сеплъыгъ "I looked at him" one also finds К1элэц1ык1ум сыкъеплъыгъ "I looked at the little boy" (e.g. to check whether he was asleep), where къы- pulls the deictic centre onto the child. Such recentrings are possible on any verb but are marked; the unmarked default remains 1st ≥ 2nd > 3rd.

==== present ====
Adyghe еплъын (to look at), present
Subject (Abs)	Object (Oblique)						
Subject (Abs)	At me	At you	At him	At us	At y'all	At them	At oneself
I		Сыоплъы	Сеплъы		Сышъоплъы	Саплъы	Сызэплъыжьы
You	Укъысэплъы		Уеплъы	Укъытэплъы		Уаплъы	Узэплъыжьы
He	Къысэплъы	Къыоплъы	Еплъы	Къытэплъы	Къышъоплъы	Аплъы	Зэплъыжьы
We		Тыоплъы	Теплъы		Тышъоплъы	Таплъы	Тызэплъыжьы
Y'all	Шъукъысэплъы		Шъуеплъы	Шъукъытэплъы		Шъуаплъы	Шъузэплъыжьы
They	Къысэплъых	Къыоплъых	Еплъых	Къытэплъых	Къышъоплъых	Аплъых	Зэплъыжьых

Kabardian еплъын (to look at), present
Subject (Abs)	Object (Oblique)						
Subject (Abs)	At me	At you	At him/them	At us	At y'all	(3PL)	At oneself
I		Сыноплъ	Соплъ		Сынывоплъ	Соплъ	Сызоплъыж
You	Укъызоплъ		Уоплъ	Укъыдоплъ		Уоплъ	Узоплъыж
He	Къызоплъ	Къоплъ	Йоплъ	Къыдоплъ	Къывоплъ	Йоплъ	Зоплъыж
We		Дыноплъ	Доплъ		Дынывоплъ	Доплъ	Дызоплъыж
Y'all	Фыкъызоплъ		Фоплъ	Фыкъыдоплъ		Фоплъ	Фызоплъыж
They	Къызоплъ(хэ)	Къоплъ(хэ)	Йоплъ(хэ)	Къыдоплъ(хэ)	Къыводоплъ(хэ)	Йоплъ(хэ)	Зоплъыж(хэ)

In Kabardian the cells "at him" and "at them" are identical (Соплъ, Йоплъ) because the dynamic -о- absorbs the oblique prefix. Verbs with spatial preverbs (e.g. пэ-, хэ-, те-) do keep the 3PL oblique а- visible, since the preverb sits between the object prefix and the dynamic vowel: Сэ абыхэм сахоплъэ "I look among them".

==== past ====
The past replaces the present suffix with Adyghe -гъ (3PL -гъэ-…-х) / Kabardian -ащ; the person prefixes are unchanged. Compare Adyghe Сеплъы "I look at him" → Сеплъыгъ "I looked at him"; Kabardian Соплъ → Сеплъащ.

Adyghe еплъыгъ (looked at) — selected forms
Subject (Abs)	At me	At you	At him	At them	At oneself
I	—	Сыоплъыгъ	Сеплъыгъ	Саплъыгъ	Сызэплъыжьыгъ
You	Укъысэплъыгъ	—	Уеплъыгъ	Уаплъыгъ	Узэплъыжьыгъ
He	Къысэплъыгъ	Къыоплъыгъ	Еплъыгъ	Аплъыгъ	Зэплъыжьыгъ
They	Къысэплъыгъэх	Къыоплъыгъэх	Еплъыгъэх	Аплъыгъэх	Зэплъыжьыгъэх

Kabardian еплъащ (looked at) — selected forms
Subject (Abs)	At me	At you	At him/them	At us	At oneself
I	—	Сыноплъащ	Сеплъащ	—	Сызэплъыжащ
You	Укъызэплъащ	—	Уеплъащ	Укъыдэплъащ	Узэплъыжащ
He	Къызэплъащ	Къоплъащ	Еплъащ	Къыдэплъащ	Зэплъыжащ
They	Къызэплъа(хэ)щ	Къоплъа(хэ)щ	Еплъа(хэ)щ	Къыдэплъа(хэ)щ	Зэплъыжа(хэ)щ

In Kabardian past forms, an "о" beside a 2nd-person argument (e.g. Сыноплъащ "I looked at you", Къоплъащ "he looked at you") is the contraction of the 2SG pronoun уэ, not the dynamic present prefix; replacing "you" with "me" or "y'all" makes the "о" disappear (Къызэплъащ, Къывэплъащ).

=== Transitive bivalent verbs ===
A transitive bivalent verb has an ergative subject and an absolutive object, ordered [Object (Abs)] – (optional cislocative) – [Subject (Erg)] – [Root]. The example is "to see" (Adyghe ылъэгъун, Kabardian лъагъун). The 3SG absolutive object is zero-marked (so Adyghe Сэлъэгъу "I see him"), and the reflexive is built with зэ-/зы- plus the re- suffix (Adyghe -жьы, Kabardian -ж).

Here the object is absolutive (a core argument, not an oblique), so the hierarchy 1st ≥ 2nd > 3rd has a weaker grip: it is more optional than in the semi-mandatory intransitive, with no categorical inverse split. Adyghe leaves the cislocative къэ- optional in every cell, inverse ones included (Селъэгъу ~ Скъелъэгъу "he sees me"); Kabardian still tends to mark a local (1st/2nd-person) object (Сыкъелъагъу "he sees me", Укъелъагъу "he sees you").

==== present ====
Adyghe ылъэгъун (to see), present — selected forms
Subject (Erg)	Me	You	Him/It	Them	Oneself
I	—	Усэлъэгъу	Сэлъэгъу	Сэлъэгъух	Зэсэлъэгъужьы
You	Сыолъэгъу	—	Улъэгъу	улъэгъух	Зэолъэгъужьы
He	Селъэгъу	Уелъэгъу	Елъэгъу	Елъэгъух	Зелъэгъужьы
They	Салъэгъу	Уалъэгъу	Алъэгъу	Алъэгъух	Залъэгъужьы

Kabardian лъагъун (to see), present — selected forms
Subject (Erg)	Me	You	Him/It	Them	Oneself
I	—	Узолъагъу	Солъагъу	Солъагъу(хэ)	Зысолъэгъужы
You	Сыболъагъу	—	Болъагъу / Уолъагъу	Болъагъу(хэ)	Зыболъэгъуж
He	Сыкъелъагъу	Укъелъагъу	Елъагъу	Елъагъу(хэ)	Зелъэгъуж
They	Сыкъалъагъу	Укъалъагъу	Ялъагъу	Ялъагъу(хэ)	Залъэгъуж

==== past ====
The past uses Adyghe -гъ / Kabardian -ащ (with the root vowel often shifting, Kabardian лъагъу- → лъэгъу-). In the Kabardian past the dynamic -о- disappears, exposing the "pure" ergative prefixes (1SG с-, 2SG п-, 1PL т- < д-, 2PL ф-, 3SG и-, 3PL я-), e.g. Слъэгъуащ "I saw him", Илъэгъуащ "he saw him", Ялъэгъуащ "they saw him". The 1PL prefix devoices before the voiceless lateral (тлъэгъуащ, not *длъэгъуащ).

Adyghe ылъэгъугъ (saw), past — selected forms
Subject (Erg)	Me	You	Him/It	Them	Oneself
I	—	Услъэгъугъ	Слъэгъугъ	Слъэгъугъх	Зыслъэгъужьыгъ
You	Сыплъэгъугъ	—	Плъэгъугъ	Плъэгъугъх	Зыплъэгъужьыгъ
He	Сылъэгъугъ	Улъэгъугъ	Ылъэгъугъ	Ылъэгъугъэх	Зилъэгъужьыгъ
They	Салъэгъугъ	Уалъэгъугъ	Алъэгъугъ	Алъэгъугъэх	Залъэгъужьыгъ

Kabardian лъэгъуащ (saw), past — selected forms
Subject (Erg)	Me	You	Him/It	Them	Oneself
I	—	Услъэгъуащ	Слъэгъуащ	Слъэгъуа(хэ)щ	Зыслъэгъужащ
You	Сыплъэгъуащ	—	Плъэгъуащ	Плъэгъуа(хэ)щ	Зыплъэгъужащ
He	Сыкъилъэгъуащ	Укъилъэгъуащ	Илъэгъуащ	Илъэгъуа(хэ)щ	Зилъэгъужащ
They	Сыкъалъэгъуащ	Укъалъэгъуащ	Ялъэгъуащ	Ялъэгъуа(хэ)щ	Залъэгъужащ

In the Kabardian past, the 3rd-person subject prefix shifts from present е- to и- (Елъагъу "he sees him" → Илъэгъуащ "he saw him"), and the 3PL absolutive object is optionally marked with (хэ). As in the present, Adyghe keeps the cislocative къэ- variants (e.g. Къэслъэгъугъ) available alongside the plain forms.

== Dynamic and stative verbs ==
Circassian verbs fall into two aspectual classes: dynamic (expressing actions, processes, or changes of state — what the subject does) and stative (also static or steady-state, expressing a condition, result, or quality — what the subject is or has). The contrast can be seen with "standing": stative Circassian щыт "(s)he is standing" versus dynamic Circassian къэтэджын "to stand up".

Dynamic verbs take the dynamic prefixes (Adyghe мэ- 3rd person, сэ- 1st person; Kabardian fused со-, уо- etc.) in the present, e.g. Adyghe ар макӀо / Kabardian сокӀуэ "I am going", Adyghe сэ сэлъэгъу / Kabardian сэ солъэгъу "I am seeing it". Stative verbs mark the subject with absolutive prefixes (1SG сы-, 2SG у-, 3SG zero), and nouns of profession or role can function as statives:

Type	Adyghe	Kabardian	Translation
Positional	ар щыс	сэ сыщысщ	"(s)he is sitting / I am sitting"
Positional	сэ сыщыт	сэ сыщытщ	"I am standing"
Existence / state	ащ иӀ	—	"(s)he has (possession)"
Equational (noun as verb)	сэ сыпхъашӀ	сэ сыпхъащӀщ	"I am a carpenter"

In Adyghe a stative verb such as щысын "to be sitting" conjugates with absolutive prefixes: сыщыс "I am sitting", ущыс "you are sitting", щыс "(s)he is sitting", тыщыс, шъущыс, щысх. Positional statives may add locative prefixes: Adyghe КӀалэр пхъэнтӀэкӀум тес "the boy is sitting on the chair", КӀалэр унэм ис "the boy is sitting inside the house". A characteristic Kabardian difference is the assertive suffix -щ on independent statives (сыщытщ "I am standing", сыпхъащӀщ "I am a carpenter").

== Participle ==
Both languages have rich participle morphology. Participles are verb forms functioning as nouns or noun modifiers, referring to one of the verb's arguments (subject, object, indirect object) or to circumstances of the action (time, place, manner, reason). They are formed by adding noun case markers (absolutive -р, oblique/ergative -м, instrumental -кӀэ, adverbial Adyghe -эу / Kabardian -у) directly to the verb form, turning it into a noun or adjective.

=== Overview: valency and arguments ===
Verb type	Adyghe	Kabardian	Gloss
Monovalent intransitive	КӀалэр макӀо	ЩӀалэр макӀуэ	Boy-ABS goes — "The boy goes"
Bivalent intransitive	КӀалэр тхылъым еджэ	ЩӀалэр тхылъым йоджэ	Boy-ABS book-OBL reads — "The boy reads the book"
Bivalent transitive	КӀалэм тхылъыр елъэгъу	ЩӀалэм тхылъыр елъагъу	Boy-ERG book-ABS sees — "The boy sees the book"
Trivalent transitive	КӀалэм пшъашъэм тхылъыр ритыгъ	ЩӀалэм хъыджэбзым тхылъыр иритащ	Boy-ERG girl-OBL book-ABS gave — "The boy gave the book to the girl"

=== The dynamic suffix -рэ: a key Adyghe–Kabardian difference ===
The suffix -рэ is a marker of dynamic action inherited from Proto-Circassian (*-ra). In Adyghe it is dropped in the plain present affirmative (макӀо) but reappears before another suffix, so present-tense dynamic participles always retain it: МакӀо → КӀорэр "the one who is going", Еплъы → Еплъырэр "the one looking at it". For Adyghe static verbs, -рэ marks a habitual reading: Щысыр "the one who is sitting (now)" vs Щысырэр "the one who usually sits". In Kabardian, by contrast, the forms without -рэ have been generalized, so the case marker attaches directly to the stem or tense suffix for both dynamic and static verbs:

Tense / type	Adyghe participle	Kabardian participle	Translation
Present dynamic	КӀорэр	КӀуэр	"the one who is going"
Present static	Щысыр	Щысыр	"the one who is sitting"
Past	Ылъэгъугъэм	Илъэгъуам	"(to) the one who saw it"

In the past and future, Adyghe also drops -рэ and attaches the case marker directly to the tense suffix, so the two languages pattern alike there.

=== Argument participles ===
Any argument of a verb can be the pivot of a participle. The base form (no prefix) refers to the absolutive argument (intransitive subject or transitive object). The prefix зы- (or з- before a vowel) marks the ergative or oblique argument (transitive subject, or an object marked by a preverb). Participles themselves take case endings (-р absolutive, -м oblique/ergative) according to their role in the larger sentence.

Prefix	Intransitive verbs	Transitive verbs
(Base / no prefix)	Absolutive subject (the one who does)	Absolutive object (the thing acted upon)
зы- (or з-)	Oblique object (the thing interacted with)	Ergative subject (the one performing the action)

For a monovalent intransitive, the base participle references the sole (absolutive) subject: Adyghe кӀон → кӀорэр / кӀуагъэр "the one who goes / went"; Kabardian кӀуэн → кӀуэр / кӀуар. For a bivalent intransitive, the subject is the base participle and the oblique object takes зы-: Adyghe еджэрэр "the one who reads" vs зэджэрэр "the thing being read"; Kabardian еджэр vs зэджэр. For a bivalent transitive, the base form is the absolutive object and зы- the ergative subject: Adyghe ылъэгъурэр "the one being seen" vs зылъэгъурэр "the one who sees it"; Kabardian илъагъур vs зылъагъур.

For trivalent verbs the base form refers to the absolutive theme (Adyghe ритырэр / Kabardian иритыр "the thing being given"), while зы- targets any non-absolutive argument (giver or recipient) and is therefore ambiguous out of context. Kabardian additionally has a dedicated ergative participle prefix combination yielding forms such as езытыр "the one who gives" alongside зритыр "the recipient", giving slightly less ambiguity than Adyghe зритырэр (which covers both).

=== Specifying the referent with the adverbial case -у ===
A stand-alone participle means "the one who…". To pin down its referent, the relevant noun is marked with the adverbial case (Adyghe -эу / Kabardian -у); since only one noun in the clause carries this marker, the participle's referent is unambiguous, even across intervening words:

- Adyghe КӀалэу макӀорэр дахэ / Kabardian ЩӀалэу кӀуэр дахэщ "the boy that is going is beautiful".
- Adyghe КӀалэр тхылъэу зеджэрэр дахэ / Kabardian ЩӀалэр Тхылъу зэджэр дахэщ "the book that the boy reads is beautiful".
- Kabardian ЩӀалэу хъыджэбзыр зылъэгъуам сыхуэзащ "I met the boy that saw the girl" (the participle зылъэгъуам refers to щӀалэу despite the intervening хъыджэбзыр).

=== Circumstantial participles ===
Circumstantial participles refer to the time, place, manner, or reason of the action. The prefixes differ between the languages:

Circumstance	Language	Prefix	Example
Temporal ("when")	Adyghe	зы-	Сызелъэгъум, ар чъагъэ "When he saw me, he ran away."
Temporal ("when")	Kabardian	щы-	Сыщилъагъум, ар жащ "When he saw me, he ran away."
Locative ("where")	Adyghe	зыдэ-	Сэ зыдэсыпсэурэр Мыекъуапэ ары "Where I live is Maykop."
Locative ("where")	Kabardian	здэ-	Сэ здэсыпсэур Налшыкщ "Where I live is Nalchik."
Manner ("how")	Adyghe	зэрэ-	Ащ зэрэгущыӀэрэр дахэ "The way he speaks is beautiful."
Manner ("how")	Kabardian	зэры-	Абы зэрыпсалъэр дахэщ "The way he speaks is beautiful."
Reason ("why")	Adyghe	зыкӀэ-	Ар зыкӀэлажьэрэр иунагъор ары "The reason he works is his family."
Reason ("why")	Kabardian	щӀэ-	Ар щӀэлажьэр и унагъуэрщ "The reason he works is his family."

== Masdar ==
The masdar (a verbal noun close to a gerund) is formed with the suffix -н in both languages: Adyghe тхы-н "writing", чъэ-н "running"; Kabardian тхы-н "a write", жэ-н "a run", псэлъэ-н "a talk". The masdar inflects for the four cases (absolutive -р, ergative -м, instrumental -мкӀэ, adverbial Adyghe -эу / Kabardian -у), e.g. Adyghe чъэны-р, чъэны-м, чъэны-мкӀэ, чъэн-эу. It can also carry person markers (Kabardian сы-жэн "I will run", у-жэн "you will run", жэн "he will run"). Example: Adyghe университетэм ущеджэныр къины "studying at university is hard".

== Negation ==
Negation uses two main morphemes, differing in shape between the languages but identical in distribution.

The suffix negates finite indicative statements (present, past, future), attaching at the end of the verb after the tense suffixes: Adyghe -эп, Kabardian -къым.

Verb (to go)	Person	Present	Past	Future
Adyghe кӀон	1SG	сыкӀорэп	сыкӀуагъэп	сыкӀощтэп
Adyghe кӀон	3SG	кӀорэп	кӀуагъэп	кӀощтэп
Kabardian кӀуэн	1SG	сыкӀуэркъым	сыкӀуакъым	сыкӀуэнукъым
Kabardian кӀуэн	3SG	кӀуэркъым	кӀуакъым	кӀуэнукъым

The prefix -мы- negates non-finite and dependent forms — imperatives, conditionals, concessives, participles, masdars, and interrogatives — attaching directly before the lexical root: Adyghe умыкӀу / Kabardian умыкӀуэ "don't go!"; Adyghe сэ сымыкӀомэ / Kabardian сэ сымыкӀуэмэ "if I don't go"; participles Adyghe мытхэрэр / Kabardian мытхэр "the one who does not write". In transitive forms the relative participle adds the ergative/oblique зы-: Adyghe зымытхыр / Kabardian зимытхыр "the one who doesn't write it".

== Tense ==
The two languages share the same tense system but use different suffixes. The most striking difference is in the distant-past zone: Adyghe collapses pluperfect, discontinuous and remote readings into a single suffix ~гъагъ, whereas Kabardian has a polysemous ~ат plus dedicated remote-past forms ~гъащ / ~гъат.

Tense	Adyghe suffix	Kabardian suffix	Meaning
Present	~∅	~∅	(s)he is going; goes
Simple past	~агъэ / ~гъ	~ащ	(s)he went
Discontinuous past	~гъагъ	~ат	(s)he went (but is not there anymore)
Pluperfect	~гъагъ	~ат	(s)he had gone
Remote past	~гъагъ	~ат / ~гъащ	(s)he went a long time ago
Remote pluperfect	~гъагъ	~гъат	(s)he had gone a long time ago
Categorical future	~н	~нщ	(s)he will go
Factual future	~щт	~нущ	(s)he will go; is about to go
Imperfect	~щтыгъ	~(р)т	(s)he was going; used to go
Conditional perfect	~щтыгъ	~нт / ~нут	(s)he would have gone
Future perfect	~гъэщт	~гъахэнущ	(s)he will have gone
Recent past	~гъакӀ	—	(s)he just went

=== Present tense ===
The present has no tense suffix of its own; it is marked by the dynamic prefix, descending from Proto-Circassian *уэ- and surfacing as the vowel immediately before the root — Adyghe -э-, Kabardian -о-. This prefix appears only in positive present dynamic forms; it is absent in the past and future, in negatives, and in mood-marked forms. Kabardian -о- frequently fuses with adjacent vowels to give со-, уо-, до-, фо-, where Adyghe -э- remains more separable. An underlying dynamic suffix *-р also belongs to the present, surfacing as -р before another suffix but silent when word-final. The present covers both the simple present and the present continuous: Adyghe сэлажьэ / Kabardian солажьэ "I work" or "I am working".

In modern spoken Kabardian the dynamic suffix -р is increasingly dropped even when not word-final, especially before the negative -къым: standard сыкӀуэркъым → spoken сыкӀуэкъым.

==== Disappearance of the dynamic prefix ====
The dynamic prefix surfaces only when the verb is at once present, positive, and mood-less. A shift to past or future, a negative, or a mood such as the conditional makes it vanish, leaving the personal prefix directly on the root. The potential (-шъу/-ф) and repetitive (-жьы/-ж) suffixes are not moods, so the prefix is retained beside them.

Retention vs. dropping of the dynamic prefix ("to go")
Context	1st sg. "I go"		3rd sg. "(s)he goes"	
Context	Ady	Kbd	Ady	Kbd
Present positive (active)	сэкӀо	сокӀуэ	мэкӀо	макӀуэ
Present + potential (retained)	сэкӀошъу	сокӀуэф	мэкӀошъу	мэкӀуэф
Present + repetitive (retained)	сэкӀожьы	сокӀуэж	мэкӀожьы	мэкӀуэж
Past (drops)	скӀуагъ	скӀуащ	кӀуагъ	кӀуащ
Future (drops)	скӀощт	скӀуэнущ	кӀощт	кӀуэнущ
Negative (drops)	сыкӀорэп	сыкӀуэркъым	кӀорэп	кӀуэркъым
Conditional (drops)	сыкӀомэ	сыкӀуэмэ	кӀомэ	кӀуэмэ

In the 3rd person there is no overt personal prefix, so the dynamic prefix would stand word-initially; because it cannot open a word as a bare vowel, it mutates to мэ- (Adyghe э-кӀо → мэкӀо, Kabardian о-кӀуэ → макӀуэ). This мэ- is the dynamic prefix in disguise, not a pronoun, and so it too drops in the past, future, negative and conditional. Once the prefix is no longer word-initial (in bivalent and transitive forms) it never mutates to мэ-; in transitive verbs it fuses with the 3rd-person ergative pronoun (Adyghe ы- → е-, Kabardian и- → е-).

=== Past tenses ===
The simple past (Adyghe ~гъ, Kabardian ~ащ) is the neutral past for completed events: Adyghe кӀуагъ / Kabardian кӀуащ "(s)he went"; the dynamic prefix is always dropped. A second past (Adyghe ~гъагъ, Kabardian ~ат) covers three readings disambiguated by context: a true pluperfect ("had gone"), a discontinuous past (the result no longer holds: Adyghe Америкэм сыщыӀэгъагъ / Kabardian Америкэм сыщыӀат "I was in America [but no longer]"), and a remote past ("back then").

Where Adyghe uses the single suffix ~гъагъ for all these distant timelines, Kabardian additionally has a dedicated pair built on the remote-past marker -гъа- (the same element inside Adyghe ~гъагъ): ~гъащ (distant past, "a long time ago": кӀуэгъащ) and ~гъат (pluperfect of the distant past: кӀуэгъат). Both correspond to the single Adyghe ~гъагъ. Adyghe alone has a recent past in ~гъакӀ (кӀогъакӀ "just went").

=== Future tenses ===
Both languages distinguish a factual future (Adyghe ~щт, Kabardian ~нущ) — a concrete plan or near-certain fact — from a categorical future (Adyghe ~н, Kabardian ~нщ) of slightly weaker certainty. Examples: Adyghe седжэщт / Kabardian седжэнущ "I will read"; Adyghe кӀон / Kabardian кӀуэнщ "(s)he will go". A future perfect (Adyghe ~гъэщт, Kabardian ~гъахэнущ) marks an action finished before a future point: Adyghe седжагъэщт / Kabardian седжэгъахэнущ "I will have read".

=== Imperfect and conditional perfect ===
The imperfect (Adyghe ~щтыгъ, Kabardian ~(р)т) has both habitual ("used to") and continuous ("was …ing") readings: Adyghe Тутын сешъощтыгъ / Kabardian Тутын сефэрт "I used to smoke". The conditional perfect ("would have done") is the same imperfect suffix ~щтыгъ in Adyghe but a distinct ~нт / ~нут (future + past) in Kabardian, in both cases recovered from an accompanying conditional clause in -мэ: Adyghe Университетым сыщеджэгъагъэмэ, джы Ӏоф нахь дэгъу сӀэщтыгъ / Kabardian Университетым сыщеджагъэтэмэ, иджы лэжьапӀэ нэхъыфӀ сиӀэнут "If I had studied at university, I would have a better job now."

== Infinitives ==
Circassian infinitives are formed by suffixing -н to the verb stem, e.g. Adyghe кӀон "to go", чъыен "to sleep", гущыӀэн "to talk" (Kabardian кӀуэн, жеин, псэлъэн). Unlike many European languages, the infinitive can retain person markers, indicating who performs the action: Adyghe ошхэ "you are eating" → ушхэн "(for) you to eat". Because nouns and verbs are interchangeable, stative infinitives can be built from nouns or adjectives: Adyghe фабэ "hot" → фэбэн "to be hot", дахэ "pretty" → дэхэн "to be pretty". The infinitive often combines with modals like фай "must/want": Adyghe Пшъашъэр дэхэн фай "the girl must be pretty". For the future or purpose (supine) Adyghe uses -нэу (infinitive -н + adverbial -эу): Сэ къыосӀонэу сыфай "I want to tell you".

== Andative and venitive ==
Circassian encodes the spatial orientation of an action on the verb. The venitive (cislocative) prefix къ(ы)~ signals an action directed toward the deictic centre (the "here" of the speech situation); its absence gives the andative reading (directed away or neutral). Compare Adyghe макӀо "(s)he goes (away)" → къакӀо "(s)he comes (here)"; Kabardian мэкӀуэ → къокӀуэ. A major difference is that Kabardian also has a productive translocative prefix н(э)~ marking the opposite pole — motion explicitly away from the centre — so both directions can be made overt; Adyghe lacks this and simply leaves the "away" direction unmarked.

=== The 1 > 2 > 3 hierarchy ===
The centre is fixed by a deictic (empathy) hierarchy, 1st person (speaker) > 2nd person (addressee) > 3rd person, and is always the highest-ranked participant in the clause. If the action points up the hierarchy (toward the centre) the verb takes the venitive къ(ы)~; if it points down, the bare andative (or, in Kabardian, the translocative н~) is used. Three consequences follow: an action whose goal is the 1st person almost always carries къ~; when addressing someone the centre may project onto the 2nd person; and when a speech-act participant interacts with a 3rd person, къ~ marks the "upward" (3 → 1/2) direction and therefore inverts the expected subject–object reading.

=== Action toward the centre ===
An action aimed at the speaker travels to the top of the hierarchy, so the venitive is effectively obligatory there, across every verb class:

Verb type	Language	Andative	Venitive (toward "me / here")
Transfer (give)	Adyghe	ты "give it"	къэт "give it to me"
Transfer (give)	Kabardian	ты	къызот
Speech (say)	Adyghe	Ӏо "say it"	къаӀу "say it to me"
Speech (say)	Kabardian	жыӀэ	къызоӀэ
Perception (look)	Adyghe	плъэ "look"	къаплъ "look at me"
Perception (look)	Kabardian	плъэ	къызоплъ
Carrying	Adyghe	хьы "carry away"	къэхь "bring it to me"
Carrying	Kabardian	хьы	къэхь

When addressing someone, the centre can project onto the 2nd person, so an action aimed at the addressee also takes къ~: Adyghe къыосэты / Kabardian укъызоплъ.

=== 3rd person: inverse marking ===
The hierarchy is most visible when a 1st/2nd person interacts with a 3rd person. Here къ~ swaps the perspective, the action being read as moving up (3 → 1/2): Adyghe Сыфэд "I am like him" → Къысфэд "he is like me"; Kabardian Сыхуэдэщ → Къысхуэдэщ.

When the 1st and 2nd persons interact directly, with no third party, къ~ contributes only a directional nuance and does not invert: Adyghe Усфэд "you are like me" → Укъысфэд (still "you are like me", directional); Kabardian Усхуэдэщ → Укъысхуэдэщ.

=== The hierarchy across the verb classes ===
The ranking can be read off the conjugation paradigms. With a monovalent intransitive there is nothing to outrank, so the venitive keeps only its "toward here" sense and is optional for every person. With a bivalent intransitive (oblique object) the directional tracks the hierarchy exactly: the three "inverse" cells (2→1, 3→1, 3→2) obligatorily take къ~, while direct cells stay bare. Here the two languages diverge instructively at the 1→2 cell ("I look at you"): Adyghe leaves it unmarked (Сыоплъы), whereas Kabardian marks it with the translocative Сыноплъ — the exact mirror of Укъызоплъ "you look at me" — spelling out that, from the speaker, the addressee lies away from the centre.

With a bivalent transitive the object is absolutive, not oblique, so there is no inverse gap: even would-be inverse cells keep a bare base form (Adyghe Сэлъэгъу, Селъагъу; Kabardian likewise), and the venitive stays optional. With a trivalent ditransitive the oblique recipient behaves like the bivalent-intransitive object, so inverse cells again carry къ~ (Adyghe Къысеты "he gives it to me"; Kabardian Къызет). In short, where the object is oblique (look at, give) the cislocative is forced in every inverse combination; where it is absolutive (see) no such gap exists; and Kabardian's extra translocative н~ makes the outward direction explicit.

The Kabardian translocative also adds outward emphasis elsewhere — ЛӀыр хасэм ныхохьэ "the man joins the council [there, away from the speaker]" vs къыхохьэ "[here]" — yielding a clean three-way contrast Adyghe cannot express morphologically.

== Morphology ==
A single Circassian verb can function as a complete sentence thanks to its polypersonal nature. Beyond the negation and tense markers already described, the verb takes a set of valency-changing prefixes and aspectual/manner suffixes.

=== Prefixes ===
==== Causative ====
The prefix гъэ~ /ʁa/ indicates causation and raises valency by adding a causer: Adyghe фабэ "hot" → егъэфабэ "(s)he heats it"; макӀо "(s)he goes" → егъакӀо "(s)he sends him"; еджэ "reads" → регъаджэ "teaches him". Kabardian patterns identically: хуабэ → егъэхуабэ, мэкӀуэ → егъакӀуэ, еджэ → регъаджэ.

==== Comitative ====
The prefix дэ~ /da/ means "together with": Adyghe макӀо → дакӀо "(s)he goes with him"; Kabardian мэкӀуэ → докӀуэ. Example: Adyghe КӀалэр пшъашъэм дэгущыӀэ / Kabardian ЩӀалэр пщащэм догущыӀэ "the boy is talking with the girl".

==== Benefactive ====
"For someone's benefit": Adyghe фэ~ /fa/, Kabardian хуэ~ /xʷa/ (the East Circassian cognate). Adyghe макӀо → факӀо "(s)he goes for him"; Kabardian мэкӀуэ → хуокӀуэ. Example: Adyghe КӀалэм псы лӀым фехьы / Kabardian ЩӀалэм псы лӀым хуехь "the boy is bringing water for the man".

==== Malefactive ====
"Against someone's interest", strongly implying taking something away: Adyghe шӀу~ /ʃʷʼa/, Kabardian фӀэ~ /fʼa/. Adyghe ехьы "carries it" → шӀуехьы "takes it from him"; Kabardian ехь → фӀехь. Example: Adyghe СичӀыгу къэсшӀуахьыгъ / Kabardian Си щӀыгур къысфӀахьащ "they took my land away from me".

=== Suffixes ===
==== Frequentative / reversive ====
"Again" or "back" (also completion): Adyghe ~жь /ʑ/, Kabardian ~ж /ʐ/. Adyghe ехьы → ехьыжьы "takes it back/again"; Kabardian ехь → ехьыж. Example: Adyghe Хым сыкӀожьынэу сыфай / Kabardian Хым сыкӀуэжыну сыхуейщ "I want to return to the sea".

==== Duration / converb ====
Marks a simultaneous action ("while"): Adyghe ~эу /aw/, Kabardian ~у /w/ (Kabardian durative ~урэ). Adyghe макӀо → кӀоу "while going"; Kabardian мэкӀуэ → кӀуэу. Example: Adyghe СыкӀоу слъэгъугъ кӀалэр / Kabardian СыкӀуэу щӀалэр слъагъуащ "while I was going, I saw the boy".

==== Capability ====
"Can, be able to": Adyghe ~шъу /ʃʷə/, Kabardian ~ф /f/. Adyghe ехьы → ехьышъу "can carry it"; Kabardian ехь → ехьыф. Example: Adyghe Фылымым сеплъышъугъэп / Kabardian Фильмым сеплъыфакъым "I could not watch the movie".

==== Manner ====
~акӀэ/~кӀэ /aːt͡ʃʼa/ turns the verb into a noun "way of [verb]ing": Adyghe макӀо → кӀуакӀэ "gait, way of walking"; Kabardian мэкӀуэ → кӀуэкӀэ. Example: Adyghe Пшъашъэм икӀуакӀэ дахэ / Kabardian Пщащэм и кӀуэкӀэ дахэщ "the girl's way of walking is beautiful". Alternatively the prefix зэрэ~/зэры~ with a case marker forms a relative-clause manner ("how (s)he does it").

== Moods ==
The 2nd-person imperative uses the bare root in the singular (Adyghe кӀо / Kabardian кӀуэ "go!") and a 2PL prefix in the plural (Adyghe шъу- → шъукӀу; Kabardian фы- → фыкӀуэ); the negative imperative takes мы- (Adyghe умыкӀу / Kabardian умыкӀуэ). Other moods are suffixal and shared: conditional -мэ ("if": Adyghe сыкӀомэ / Kabardian сыкӀуэмэ); concessive -ми ("even if": Adyghe сыкӀоми / Kabardian сыкӀуэми); interrogative (yes/no question) Adyghe -а (кӀуагъа? "did he go?"), Kabardian using -къэ for the negative interrogative; and negative interrogative Adyghe -ба (макӀоба? "he is going, isn't he?"). Adyghe additionally has an optative in ~гъот (укӀуагъот "if only you went").

== Positional conjugation ==
Positional prefixes express location and the spatial direction of a verb. The same set of preverbs combines productively with dynamic roots such as "to look" and "to throw", and with static roots for "stands/sits/lies". The two languages use cognate prefixes (Adyghe чӀэ- = Kabardian щӀэ- "under", Adyghe къо- = Kabardian къуэ- "behind", etc.); the Kabardian forms additionally show the fusion of the dynamic -о- into the preverb (e.g. Adyghe теплъэ "looks on" vs Kabardian топлъ).

Position	Prefix		"Looking"		"Throwing"	
Position	Ady	Kbd	Ady	Kbd	Ady	Kbd
Body position/pose	щы~		щеплъэ	щоплъ	щедзы	щедз
On	те~		теплъэ	топлъ	тедзэ	тедз
Under	чӀэ~	щӀэ~	чӀаплъэ	щӀоплъ	чӀедзэ	щӀедз
Through / within a mass	хэ~		хаплъэ	хоплъ	хедзэ	хедз
Within an area / inside object	дэ~		даплъэ	доплъ	дедзэ	дедз
Around	Ӏу~		Ӏуаплъэ	Ӏуоплъ	Ӏуедзэ	Ӏуедз
Inside	и~		еплъэ	йоплъ	редзэ	редз
Behind	къо~	къуэ~	къуаплъэ	къуоплъ	къуедзэ	къуедз
Past	блэ~		блэплъы	блоплъ	бледзэ	бледз

Static positional verbs change the root for "stands / sits / lies" after the same preverbs: Adyghe щыт / щыс / щылъ, тет / тес / телъ, чӀэт / чӀэс / чӀэлъ (Kabardian щыт / щыс / щылъ, тет / тес / телъ, щӀэт / щӀэс / щӀэлъ).

=== Transitivity and the positional prefix ===
Adding a positional prefix introduces a new locative argument in the oblique case, raising valency. A monovalent intransitive becomes bivalent intransitive (the default 3rd-person dynamic prefix мэ-/ма- drops): Adyghe Ар мэплъэ "he is looking" → Ар ащ теплъэ "he is looking at that"; Kabardian Ар маплъэ → Ар абы топлъ. A bivalent intransitive has the positional prefix replace the standard directional, shifting the existing oblique from a general target to a specific locative one. A bivalent transitive becomes trivalent transitive, the positional prefix stacking with the ergative marker: Adyghe КӀалэм мыжъор едзы "the boy throws the stone" → КӀалэм мыжъор хым хедзэ "…into the sea"; Kabardian ЩӀалэм мывэр едз → ЩӀалэм мывэр хым хедз. A trivalent transitive cannot take a positional prefix, since its single oblique slot is already filled.

=== Bound positional roots ===
Certain motion roots cannot stand alone and require a positional prefix. The same root combines with те- (on), чӀэ-/щӀэ- (under), и- (inside), хэ- (within a mass): for "to enter", Adyghe техьан / чӀэхьан / ихьан / хэхьан, Kabardian техьэн / щӀэхьэн / ихьэн / хэхьэн; for "to exit/go off", Adyghe текӀын / чӀэкӀын / икӀын / хэкӀын, Kabardian текӀын / щӀэкӀын / икӀын / хэкӀын. For transitive roots the 3SG ergative -е- fuses with the preverb (Adyghe чӀэ+е+хы+н = чӀехын "to take out from under"; Kabardian щӀехын).

=== Direction by stem vowel (Adyghe) ===
Adyghe also marks direction by the stem vowel inside a positional circumfix: -э- for motion to and -ы- for motion from. Thus тепкӀэн "to jump onto" vs тепкӀын "to jump off"; хэпкӀэн "to jump into" vs хэпкӀын "to jump out of"; the same alternation applies to дзын "to throw", плъэн "to look", and тӀэрэн "to drop".
