= List of chickpea dishes =

Foods using chickpeas or their flour as a primary ingredient

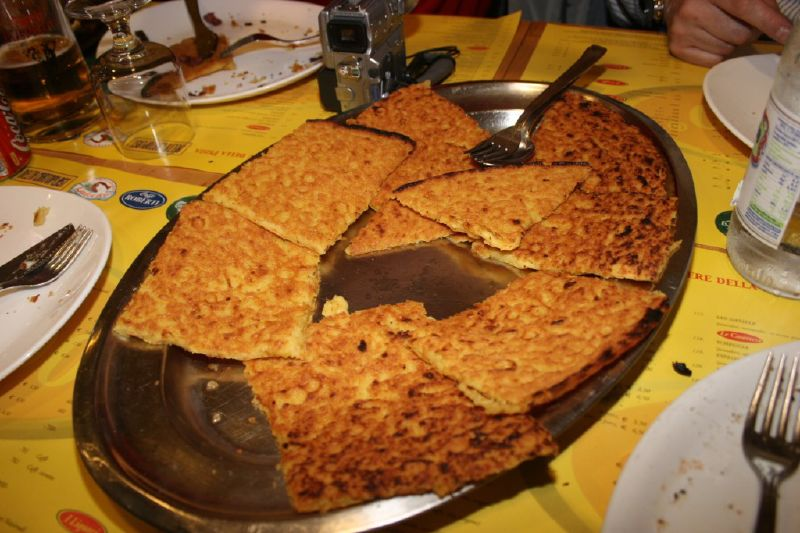
Farinata

This is a list of chickpea dishes and foods that use chickpeas (also known as garbanzo beans) or chickpea flour (gram flour) as a primary ingredient.

== Chickpea dishes ==
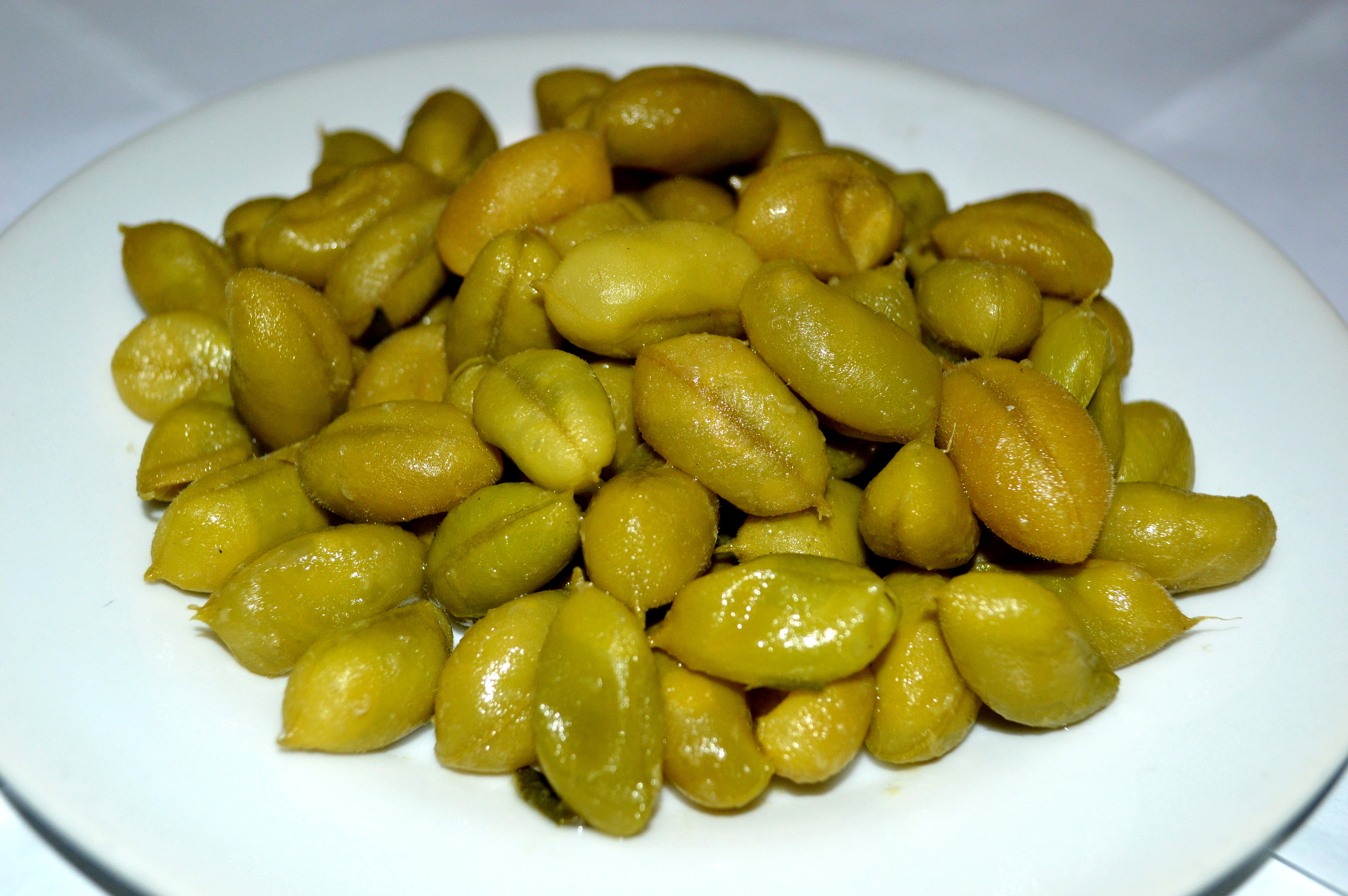
Guasanas

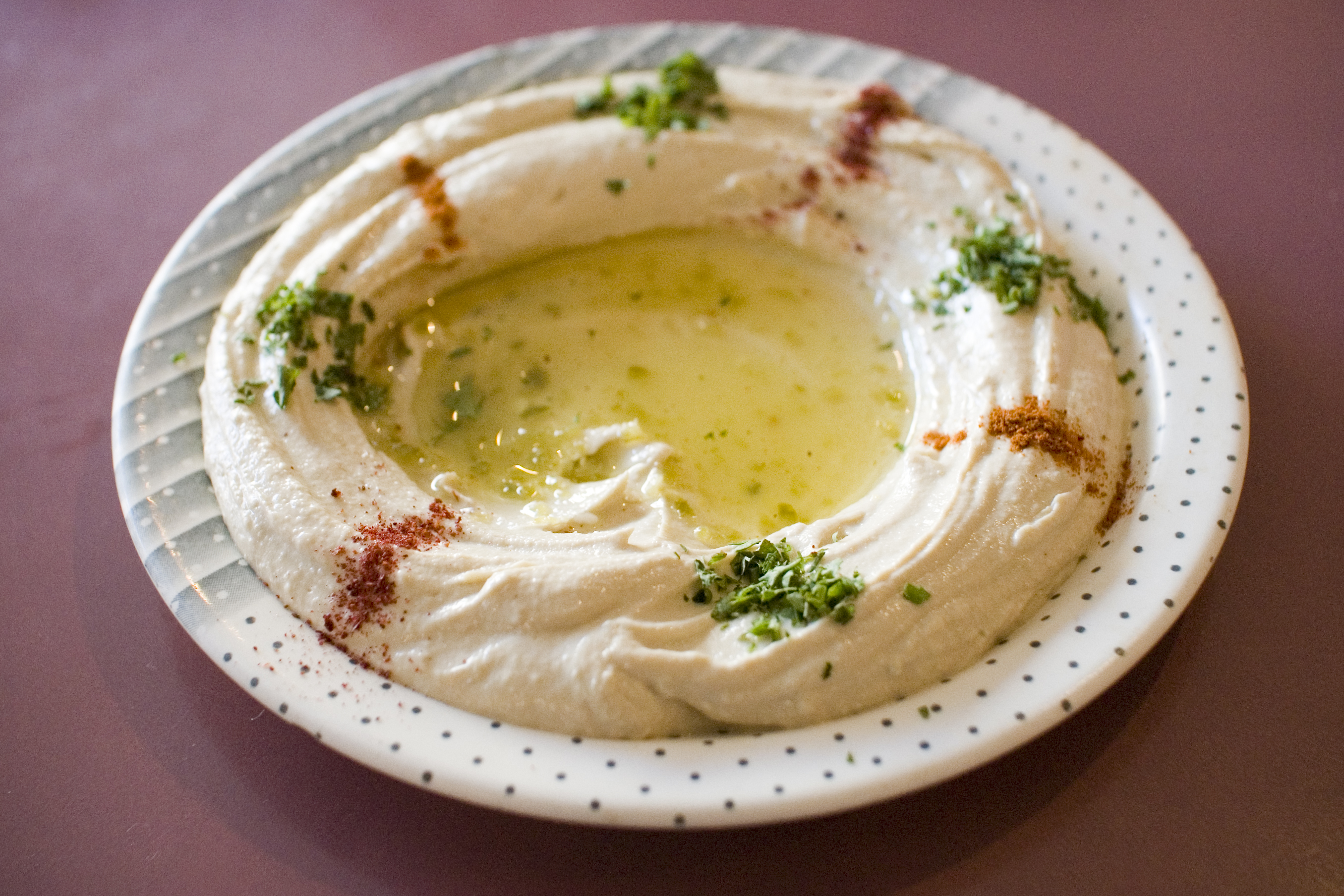
Hummus

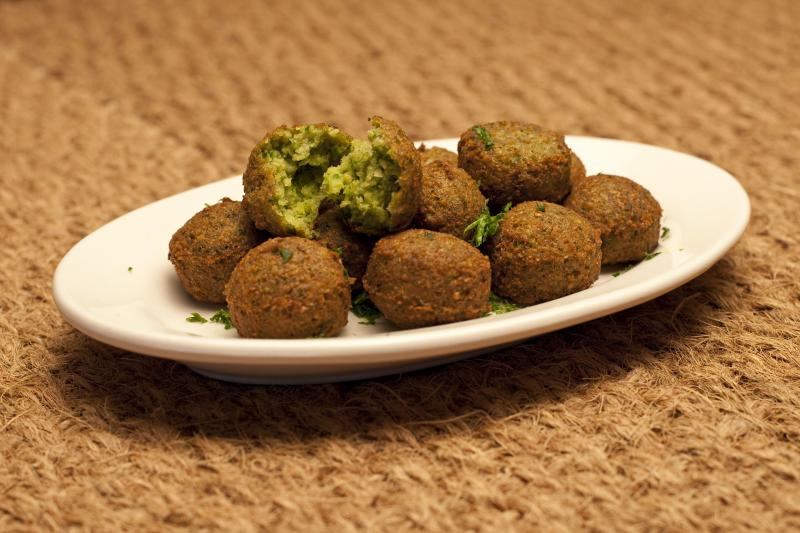
Falafel

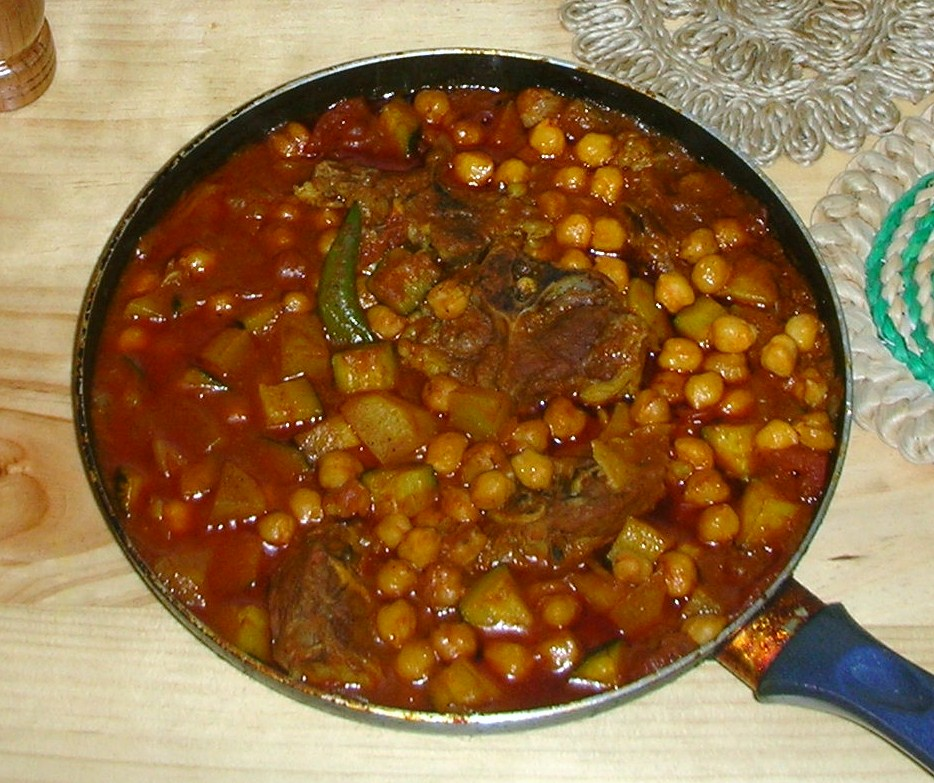
Marqa, with the chickpeas visible on the surface. This is part of the dish chakhchoukha, which is also served with rougag, a flatbread.

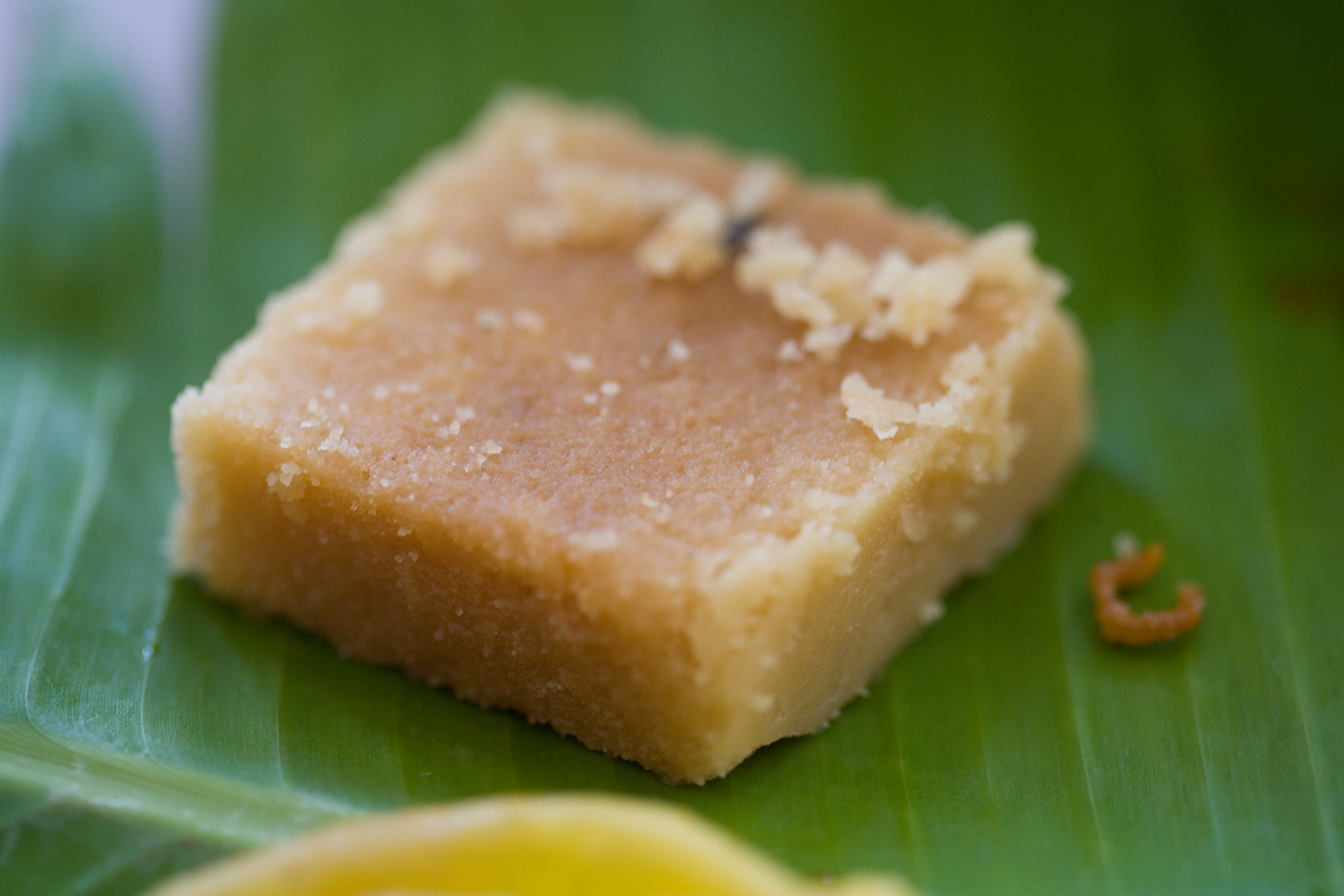
Mysore pak is a rich, sweet dish prepared with ghee, sugar, gram flour, and often cardamom.

- Abgoosht – Traditional and original Iranian stew and food
- Aquafaba – Legume seed cooking water
- Beguni - Deep-fried gram flour-dipped eggplant, popular in Bangladesh. The European version is known as aubergine fritters.
- Besan barfi – Indian dessert
- Besan halwa – Confections often made from nut butters or flours
- Bhajji – Spiced fritter originally from the Indian subcontinent
- Bikaneri bhujia – Indian snack food
- Bonda – Deep-fried potato snack
- Boondi – Indian snack made from fried chickpea flour
- Bread pakora – Indian deep-fried snack
- Burmese tofu – includes chickpea flour in its preparation
- Caldo tlalpeño – Chicken and vegetable soup in Mexican cuisine
- Chakhchoukha – Algerian dish of torn bread and stew
- Chakli – Savoury Indian snack
- Chana dal – Dried, split pulses used for cooking
- Chana masala – Chickpea dish from the Indian subcontinent
- Chickpea bread – Type of bread made from chickpea flour from Albania and Turkey
- Chickpea noghl – Iranian, Afghan, and Turkish confection
- Ciceri e tria
- Cocido madrileño – Spanish chickpea-based stew
- Cocido lebaniego – Traditional dish from Cantabria containing chickpeas
- Dhokla – Indian vegetarian dish
- Falafel – Middle Eastern fried bean dish
- Farinata – Chickpea pancake
- Ganthiya – Indian snack food
- Guasanas – a dish from Mexico consisting of chickpeas, water and salt. The chickpeas are steamed and shelled before serving.
- Hummus – Middle Eastern chickpea puree dish
- Kadhi – Yogurt-based dish from India
- Karantika – Algerian street dish – Algerian chickpea flan
- Keledoş – Soup of Iran, Armenia, Azerbaijan, and Turkey
- Khaman – Snack in Gujarat, India
- Lablabi, Tunisian chickpea soup
- Laddu – Spherical sweet from the Indian subcontinent
- Lagane e cicciari – Italian pasta dish
- Leblebi – Turkish toasted chickpea snack
- Meia-desfeita – Portuguese cod and chickpea dish
- Minestra di ceci – Italian soup based on chickpeas
- Msabbaha – Variation of hummus
- Mysore pak – Sweet dish in India
- Pakora – Spiced fritter originally from the Indian subcontinents
- Panelle - Fried Italian chickpea fritters; common street food in Sicily
- Panisse - Smaller and thicker sort of socca from Marseille to Nice
- Papadum – Flatbread from the Indian subcontinents
- Patra – Vegetarian dish from India
- Pitaroudia — chickpea fritters or dumplings, in Greek cuisine
- Puchero – Spanish and South American stew
- Revithada — dish, in Greek cuisine, that involves baked chickpeas
- Revithia — chickpea soup, in Greek cuisine
- Sev – South Asian snack food
- Shiro – Powdered stew from Ethiopia and Eritrea
- Socca – Chickpea pancake
- Sohan papdi – Indian dessert
- Topik – American chickpea-based dish
- Zunka (also known as pithla – Vegetarian traditional dish of India

== See also ==
- List of legume dishes
- Lists of prepared foods
