= Çorum =

- Municipality
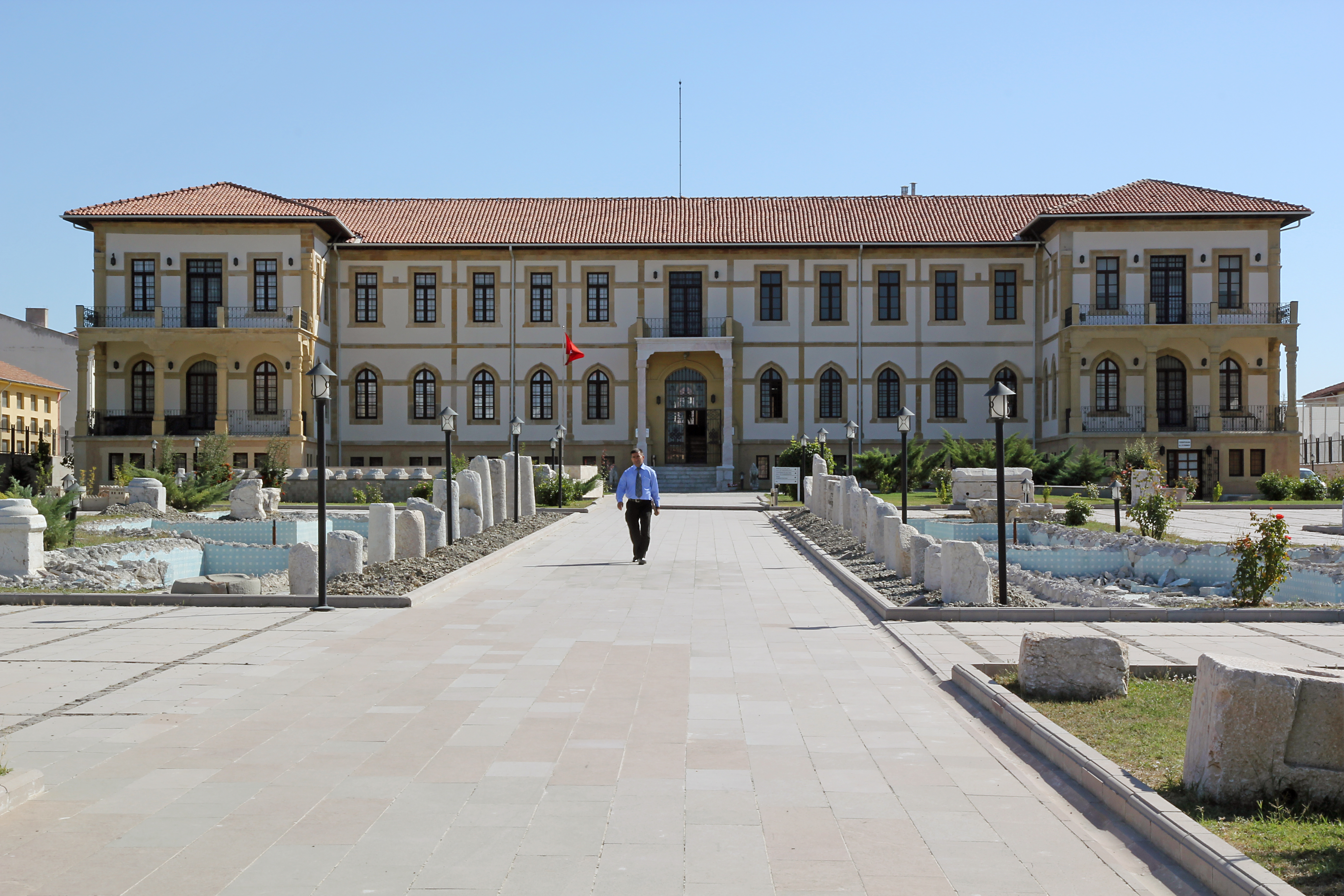
- Çorum Archaeological Museum

- Coat of arms

- Location within Turkey
- Coordinates: 40°33′0″N 34°57′14″E
- Country: Turkey
- Province: Çorum
- District: Çorum

Government
  - Mayor: Halil İbrahim Aşgın (AK Party)
- Population (2022): 269,595
- Time zone: UTC+3 (TRT)
- Website: www.corum.bel.tr

Çorum (Turkish pronunciation: [ˈtʃoɾum]) is a northern Anatolian city in Turkey. Çorum is located inland in the central Black Sea Region of Turkey and is approximately 244 km (152 mi) from Ankara and 608 km (378 mi) from Istanbul. It is the seat of Çorum Province and of Çorum District. Its population is 269,595 (2022). The city has an elevation of 801 m (2,628 ft) above sea level.

Çorum is primarily known for its Phrygian and Hittite archaeological sites, its thermal springs, and its native roasted chickpea snacks known nationally as leblebi.

== History ==
There is ample archaeological evidence for human presence in the area since the Paleolithic Age. The area prospered during the Bronze Age, with the emergence of the Hittite Empire between 1650 and 1200 BCE. Hattusa, the Hittite capital, was located in the region owing to its inherent geographic protection and the well-established local economy as supported by the regional Karum system.

There is a hypothesis that the Byzantine town of Euchaneia was at or near the site of the modern city, but others place Euchaneia further east, at Euchaita. In Ancient Greek sources, Çorum was known as Niconia (Nikonya), and in the Byzantine period known as Evkaite.

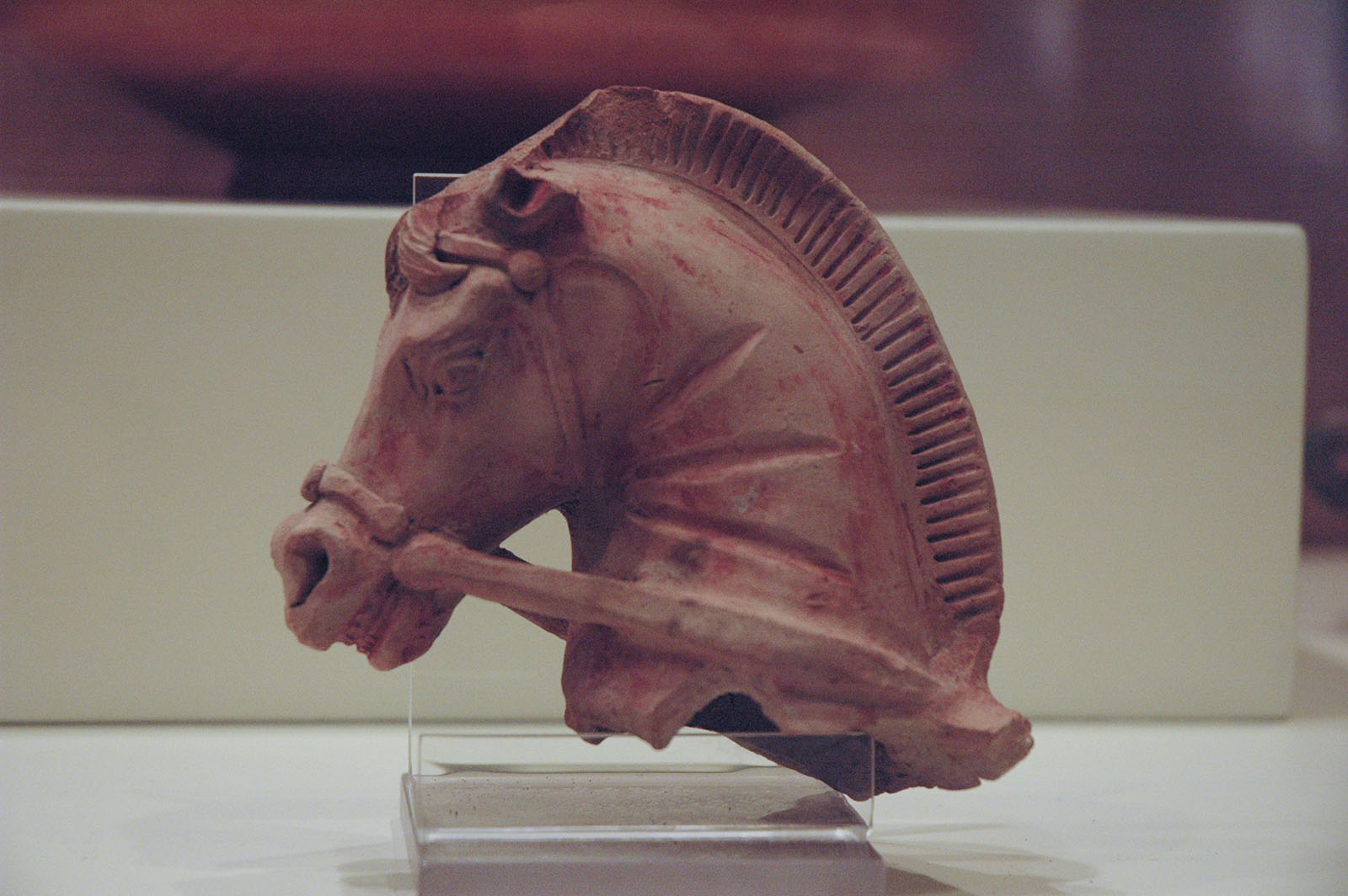
A fragment of a ceramic Phrygian pottery in the Çorum Archaeological Museum.

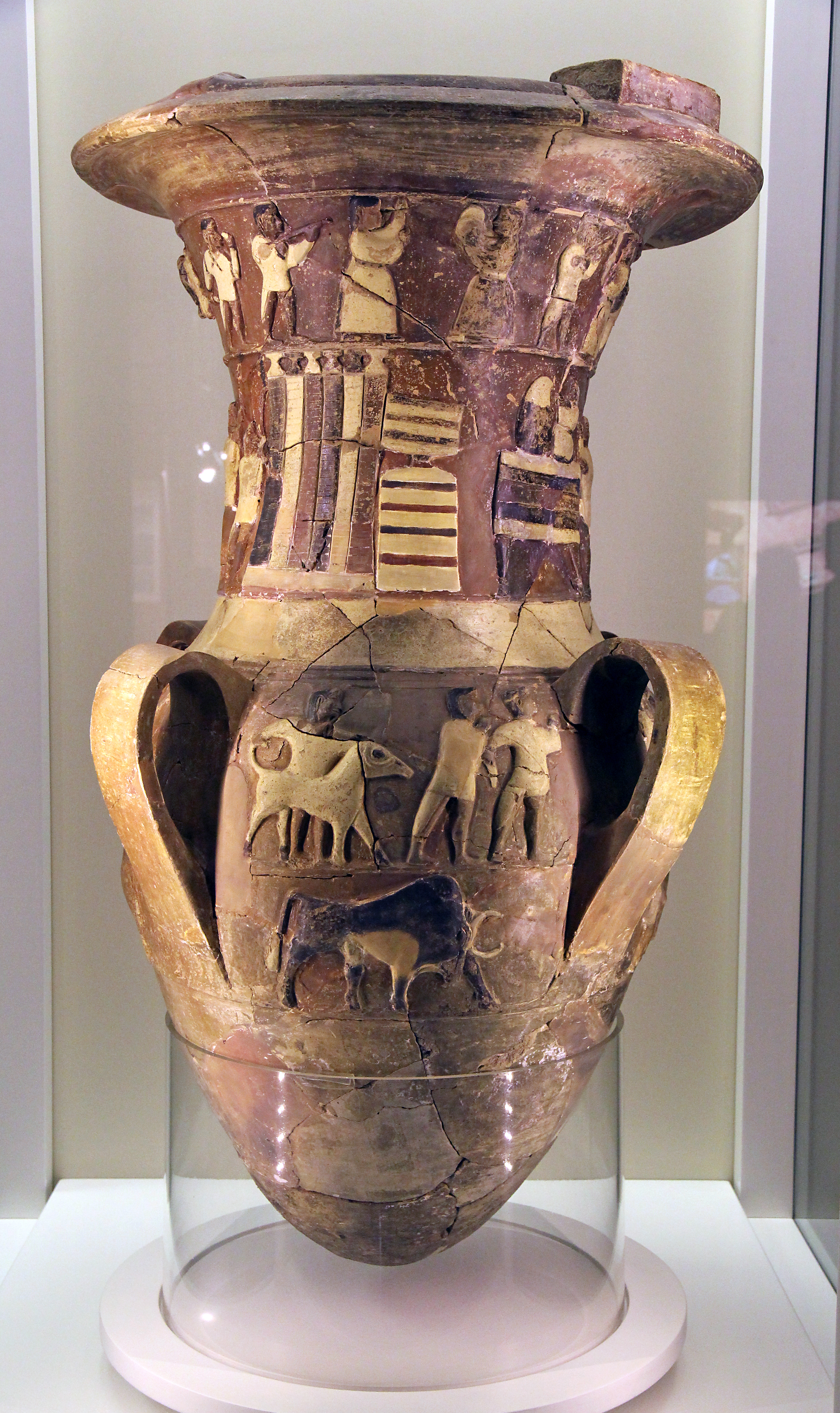
An Early Hittite era Hüseyindede vase fragment in the Çorum Archaeological Museum.

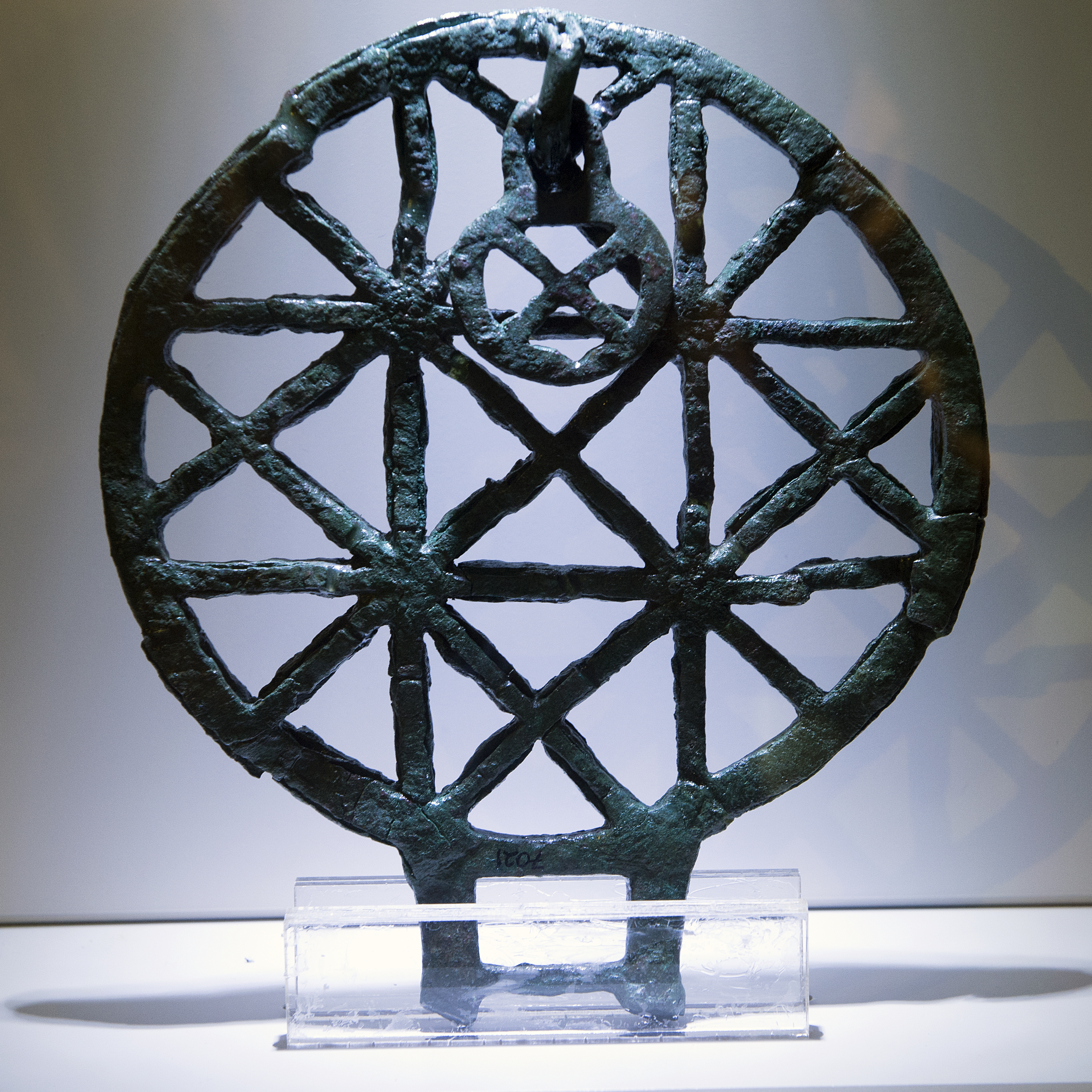
Sun disk, (2400-2200 BC, Early Bronze age) from Alahöyük in the Eskişehir Archaeology Museum.

The settlement of Çorum proper can be traced only to the 16th century. The name is of unknown origin and is first attested in Ottoman records about a Seljuk fortress, Çorum Kalesi, described by Evliya Çelebi. In the mid-16th century, the fortress was divided into four mahalle, or quarters. From 1867 until 1922, Çorum was part of the Angora vilayet.

== Çorum today ==
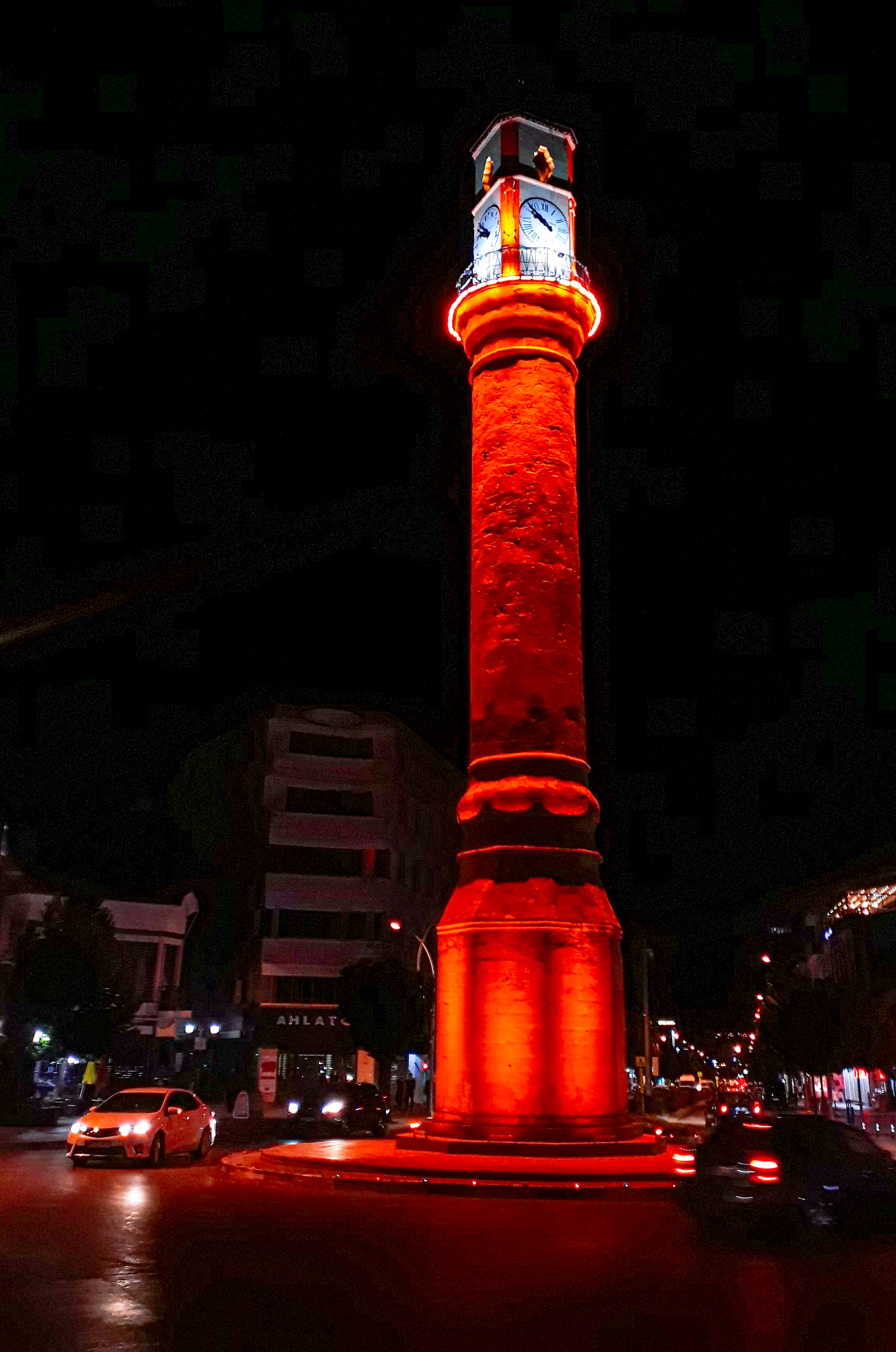
Çorum Clock Tower.

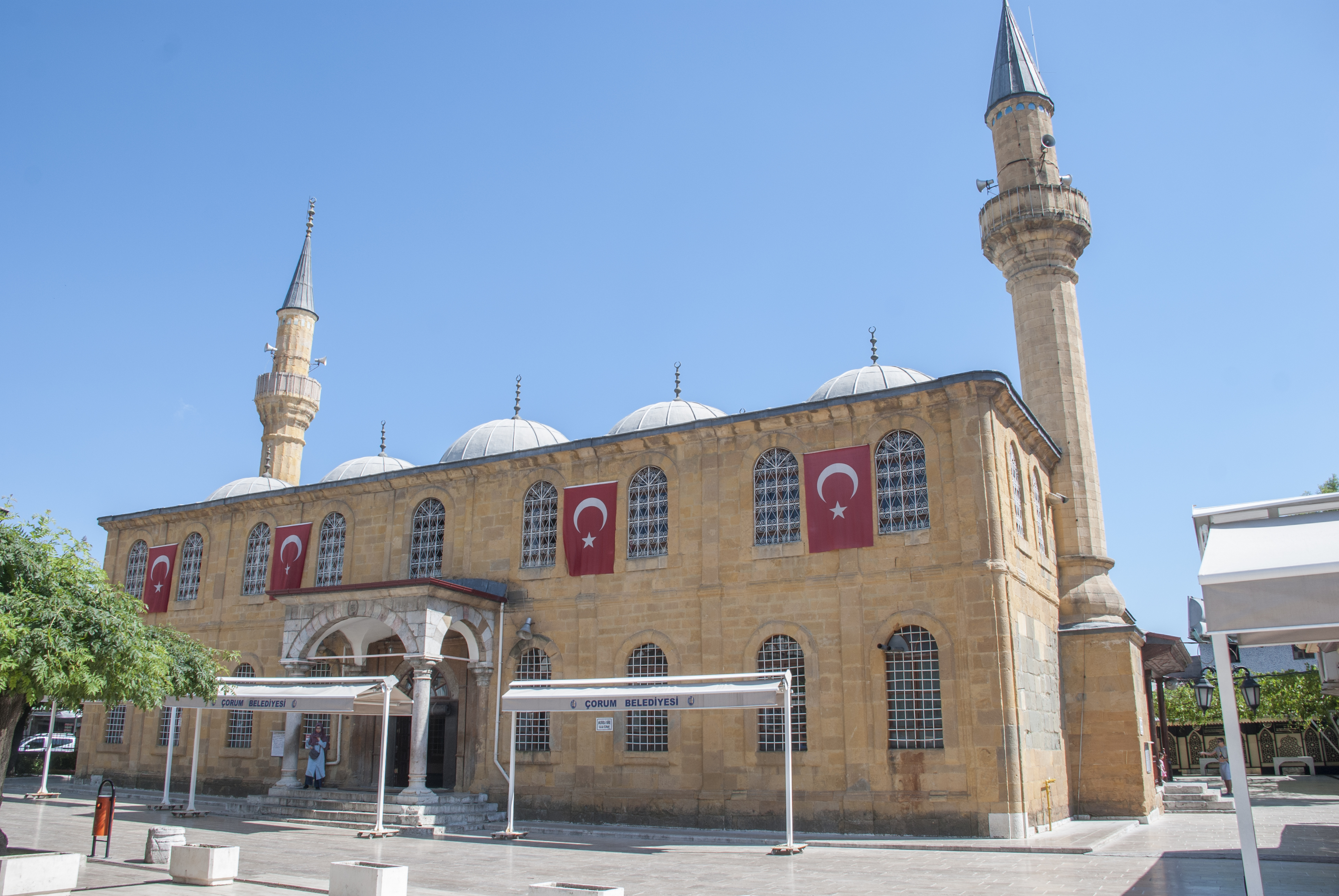
Çorum Ulu Mosque

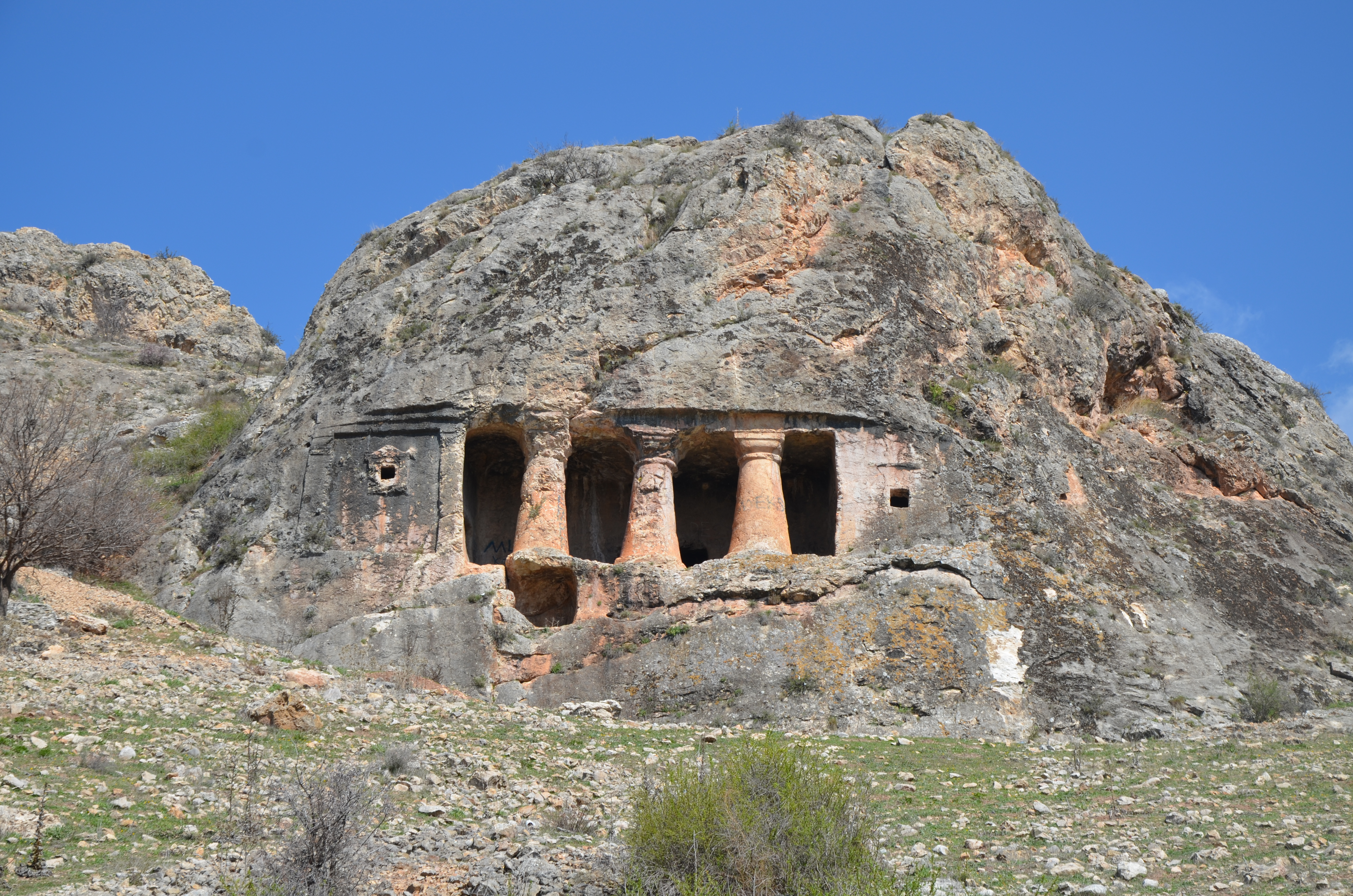
Gerdek Rock-cut tomb, Hellenistic period, 2nd century BCE, District of Çorum.

The town today is generally tidy and pleasant, with a locally popular countryside. As with most Central Anatolian and inland Black Sea towns, the population is largely conservative, leading to a generally more restricted nightlife that favors dry establishments, although there are some bars, pubs, and cafés that offer a mix of contemporary and traditional Turkish folk music. Within the city, there is a good range of shops, cafés, and restaurants, with a cuisine that includes a variety of pastries including the nationally known Çorum Mantısı - a popular dish similar to ravioli that is slowly baked in a brick oven or steamed in a beef broth. As well as the archeological and other historic sites, the countryside surrounding Çorum offers many places for picnics, particularly near the Çomar reservoir or in the mountains around the province.

The old Ottoman houses, the 19th-century clock tower, and the Çorum Museum, which displays a range of artefacts from excavations in the region, are popular tourist attractions. An International Hittite Congress of archaeologists is held in Çorum every three years. Hittite University is the city's primary higher education institute.

== Economy ==
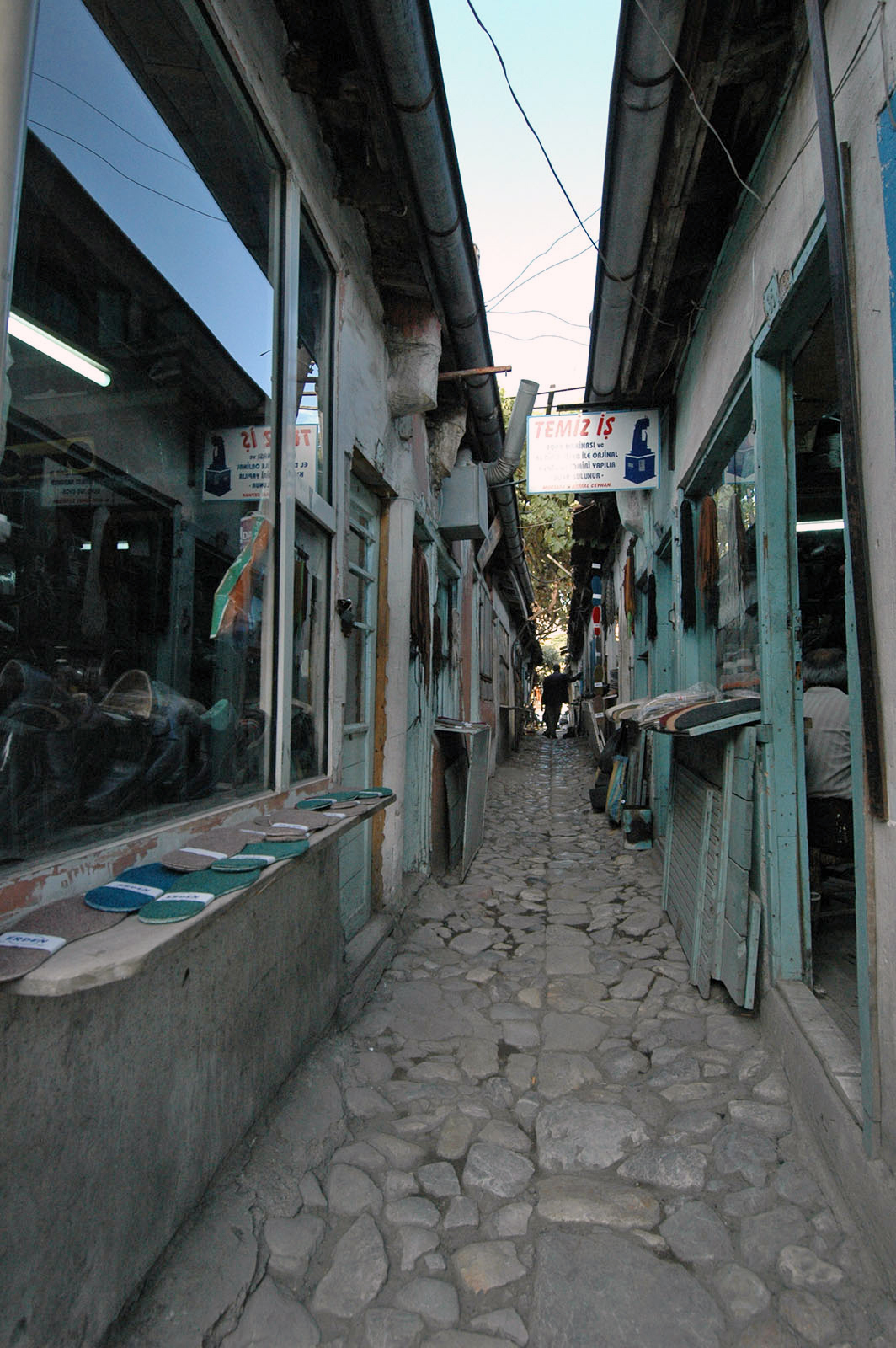
Old shoe repair street, Çorum.

Although the economic output of the city has historically been relatively small, with a focus on traditional crafts such as coppersmithing, tanning, hand weaving, agriculture, and animal husbandry, over the past two decades, the city has shown a significant growth in industrial production and light engineering, making it one of the most industrially advanced cities relative to its population size.

Originally home to about 20 tile and brick manufacturing facilities and 10 flour and feed mills, the city today produces a wide variety of products ranging from cement to automobile parts, refined sugar to dairy products, textiles to computer parts, and, more recently, poultry through chicken farming.

== Population ==
Population of the city of Çorum
| 2017 | 227,863 |
| 2009 | 206,600 |
| 2000 | 161,321 |
| 1990 | 116,810 |
| 1985 | 96,725 |
| 1980 | 75,726 |
| 1970 | 57,576 |

== Geography ==
Çorum is on the northern edge of the Central Anatolian Plateau. The city is on a plain surrounded by mountains. The Merzifon branch of the North Anatolian Fault passes about 25 km (16 mi) north of Çorum, with the main fault line passing about 60 km (37 mi) north.

=== Climate ===
Çorum has a warm summer continental climate (Köppen climate classification: Dfb or Trewartha climate classification: Dcb) with dry summers and cold, snowy winters. It also has mild to cool wet springs and autumns with light rain.

Highest recorded temperature: 42.6 °C (108.7 °F) on 30 July 2000.
Lowest recorded temperature:−27.2 °C (−17.0 °F) on 23 February 1985.

Climate data for Çorum (1991–2020, extremes 1929–2023)
| Month | Jan | Feb | Mar | Apr | May | Jun | Jul | Aug | Sep | Oct | Nov | Dec | Year |
|---|---|---|---|---|---|---|---|---|---|---|---|---|---|
| Record high °C (°F) | 20.6 (69.1) | 20.4 (68.7) | 28.6 (83.5) | 30.4 (86.7) | 35.1 (95.2) | 37.5 (99.5) | 42.6 (108.7) | 40.2 (104.4) | 38.7 (101.7) | 33.6 (92.5) | 25.6 (78.1) | 19.2 (66.6) | 42.6 (108.7) |
| Mean daily maximum °C (°F) | 4.6 (40.3) | 7.4 (45.3) | 12.5 (54.5) | 17.9 (64.2) | 22.9 (73.2) | 26.8 (80.2) | 30.2 (86.4) | 30.7 (87.3) | 26.7 (80.1) | 20.7 (69.3) | 12.9 (55.2) | 6.5 (43.7) | 18.3 (64.9) |
| Daily mean °C (°F) | −0.2 (31.6) | 1.4 (34.5) | 5.6 (42.1) | 10.4 (50.7) | 15.0 (59.0) | 18.7 (65.7) | 21.7 (71.1) | 21.9 (71.4) | 17.8 (64.0) | 12.5 (54.5) | 5.6 (42.1) | 1.6 (34.9) | 11.0 (51.8) |
| Mean daily minimum °C (°F) | −4.1 (24.6) | −3.5 (25.7) | −0.3 (31.5) | 3.4 (38.1) | 7.4 (45.3) | 10.7 (51.3) | 12.8 (55.0) | 13.1 (55.6) | 9.6 (49.3) | 5.7 (42.3) | 0.2 (32.4) | −2.2 (28.0) | 4.4 (39.9) |
| Record low °C (°F) | −25.6 (−14.1) | −27.2 (−17.0) | −23.3 (−9.9) | −9.4 (15.1) | −4.3 (24.3) | 0.2 (32.4) | 3.4 (38.1) | 3.0 (37.4) | −3.0 (26.6) | −6.3 (20.7) | −15.7 (3.7) | −21.6 (−6.9) | −27.2 (−17.0) |
| Average precipitation mm (inches) | 37.4 (1.47) | 28.5 (1.12) | 42.0 (1.65) | 46.6 (1.83) | 61.7 (2.43) | 63.5 (2.50) | 21.4 (0.84) | 19.0 (0.75) | 24.9 (0.98) | 27.9 (1.10) | 32.9 (1.30) | 43.0 (1.69) | 448.8 (17.67) |
| Average precipitation days | 11.33 | 10.57 | 11.73 | 11.93 | 13.53 | 11.47 | 4.03 | 3.33 | 4.97 | 7.5 | 7.73 | 11.77 | 109.9 |
| Average snowy days | 9.8 | 6.2 | 5.08 | 0.8 | 0 | 0 | 0 | 0 | 0 | 0.12 | 1.12 | 5.12 | 28.24 |
| Average relative humidity (%) | 81 | 75.2 | 70.2 | 66.7 | 67.8 | 66.3 | 59.6 | 58.9 | 61.9 | 68.5 | 75.5 | 81.8 | 69.5 |
| Mean monthly sunshine hours | 67.1 | 96.5 | 144.7 | 191.1 | 233.7 | 267.3 | 316.7 | 309.6 | 244.4 | 173.6 | 116.0 | 61.2 | 2,222 |
| Mean daily sunshine hours | 2.2 | 3.5 | 4.7 | 6.4 | 7.6 | 8.9 | 10.2 | 10.0 | 8.2 | 5.6 | 3.9 | 2.0 | 6.1 |
Source 1: Turkish State Meteorological Service
Source 2: NOAA NCEI(humidity, sun 1991-2020), Meteomanz(snow days 2000-2024)

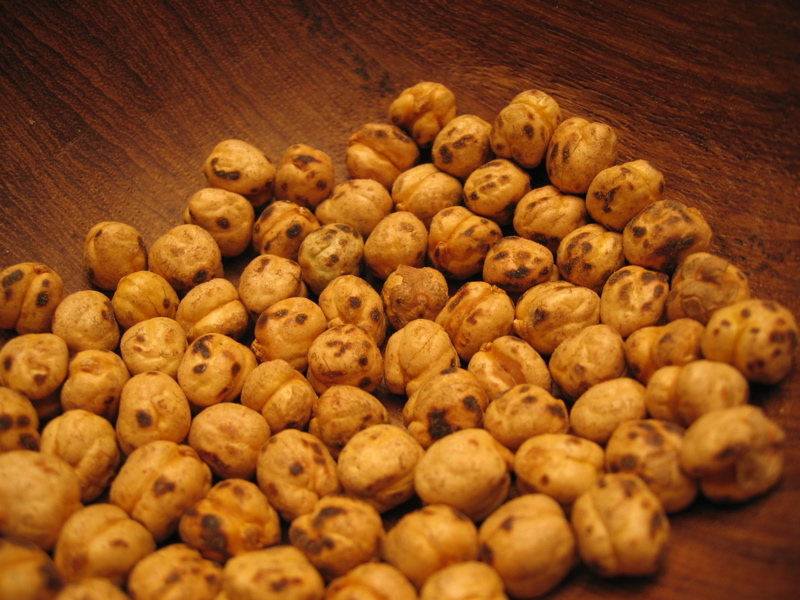
Çorum leblebi

== Transport ==
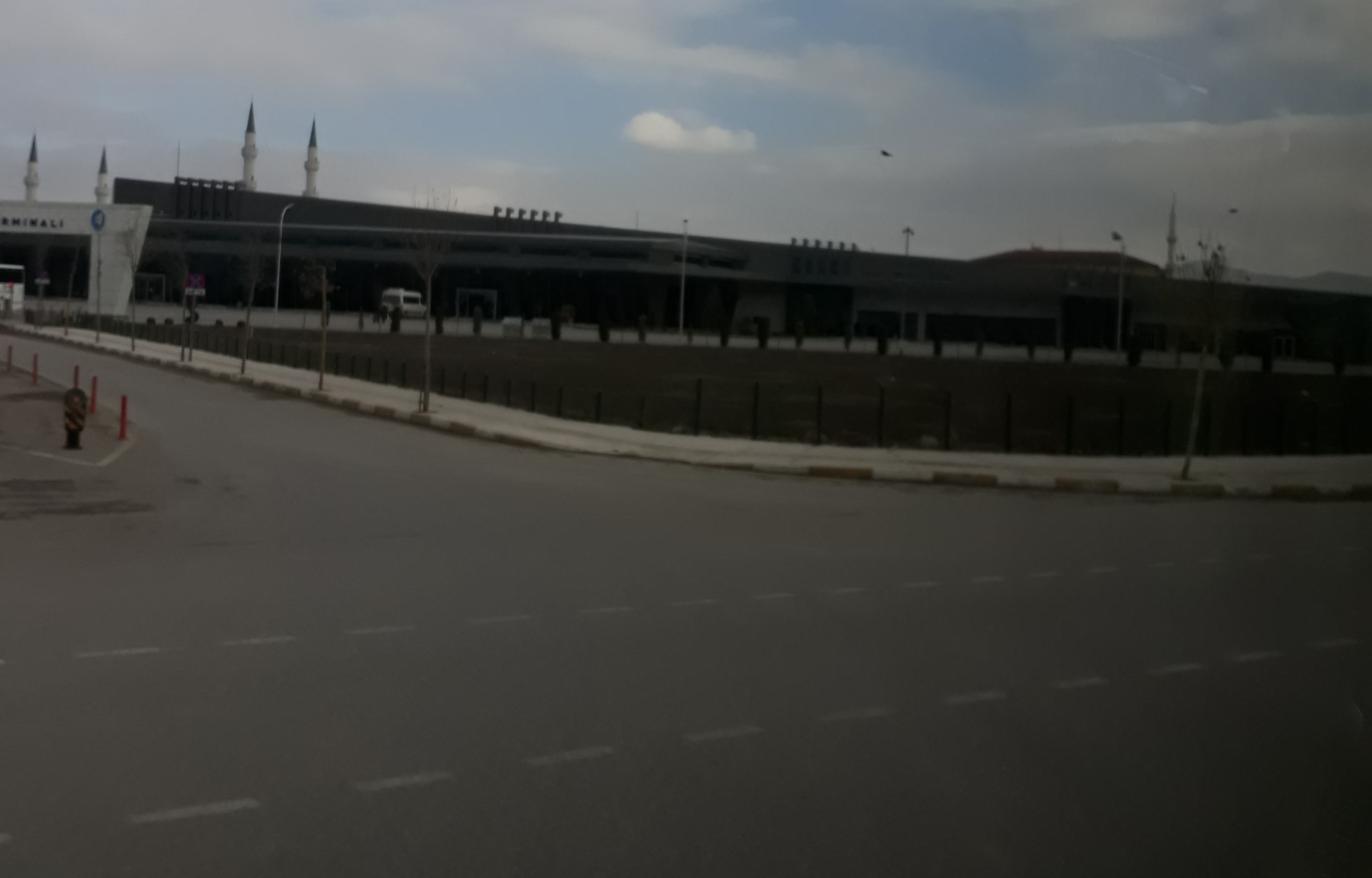
Bus Terminal

There are many ways to reach Çorum by road. The transportation by road from the capital Ankara is via E88. A station point was created for the high-speed train line to be built between Ankara-Samsun by TCDD, passing through Çorum. It is possible to reach Çorum Intercity Bus Terminal by bus from anywhere in Turkey.

== Twin towns – sister cities ==
- Gimhae, South Gyeongsang, South Korea
- Merribek, Victoria, Australia

== Notable People of Çorum ==
- İskilipli Mehmed Atıf Hoca, Islamist
- Süleyman Özmen, Idealist student
- Elif Çakır, journalist
- Nihat Nikerel, actor
- Aşık Gülabi, folk poet
- Mahmut Atalay, wrestler

== Mayors of Çorum Province ==
- 1973-1984 and 1989-1994 Turhan Kılıççıoğlu CHP, SHP
- 1984-1989 Necdet Diken ANAP
- 1994-2002 Arif Ersoy Refah Party, Fazilet Partisi, AK Party
- 2002-2003 Ömer Abuhanoğlu AK Party
- 2003-2009 Turan Atlamaz AK Party
- 2009-2018 Muzaffer Külcü AK Party
- 2018-2019 Zeki Gül AK Party
- 2019-present Halil İbrahim Aşgın AK Party

== See also ==
- Anatolian Tigers
- Amasya
- Chickpea noghl
- Leblebi
