= Hüseyindede vases =

Early Hittite vases found in Turkey

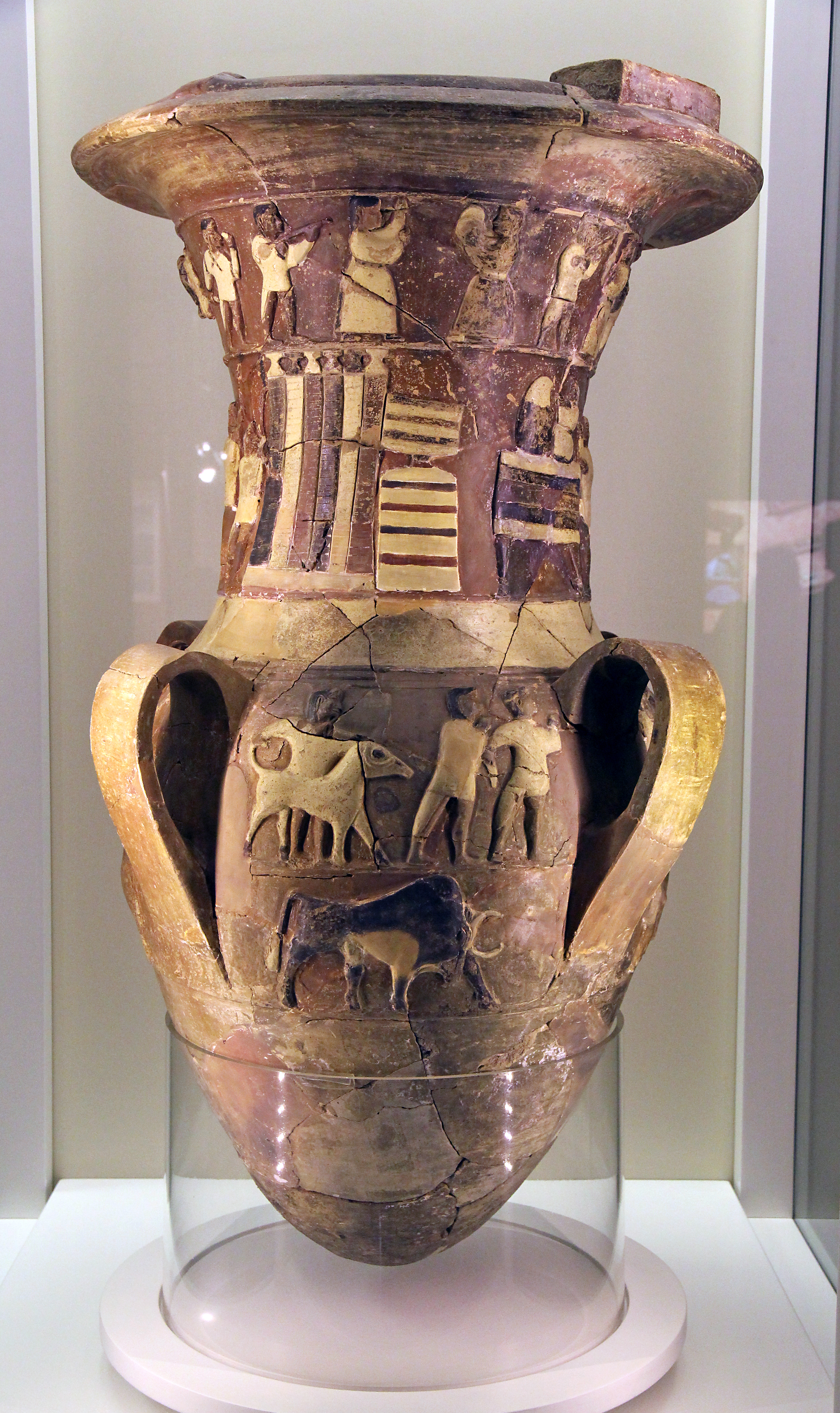
Vase A

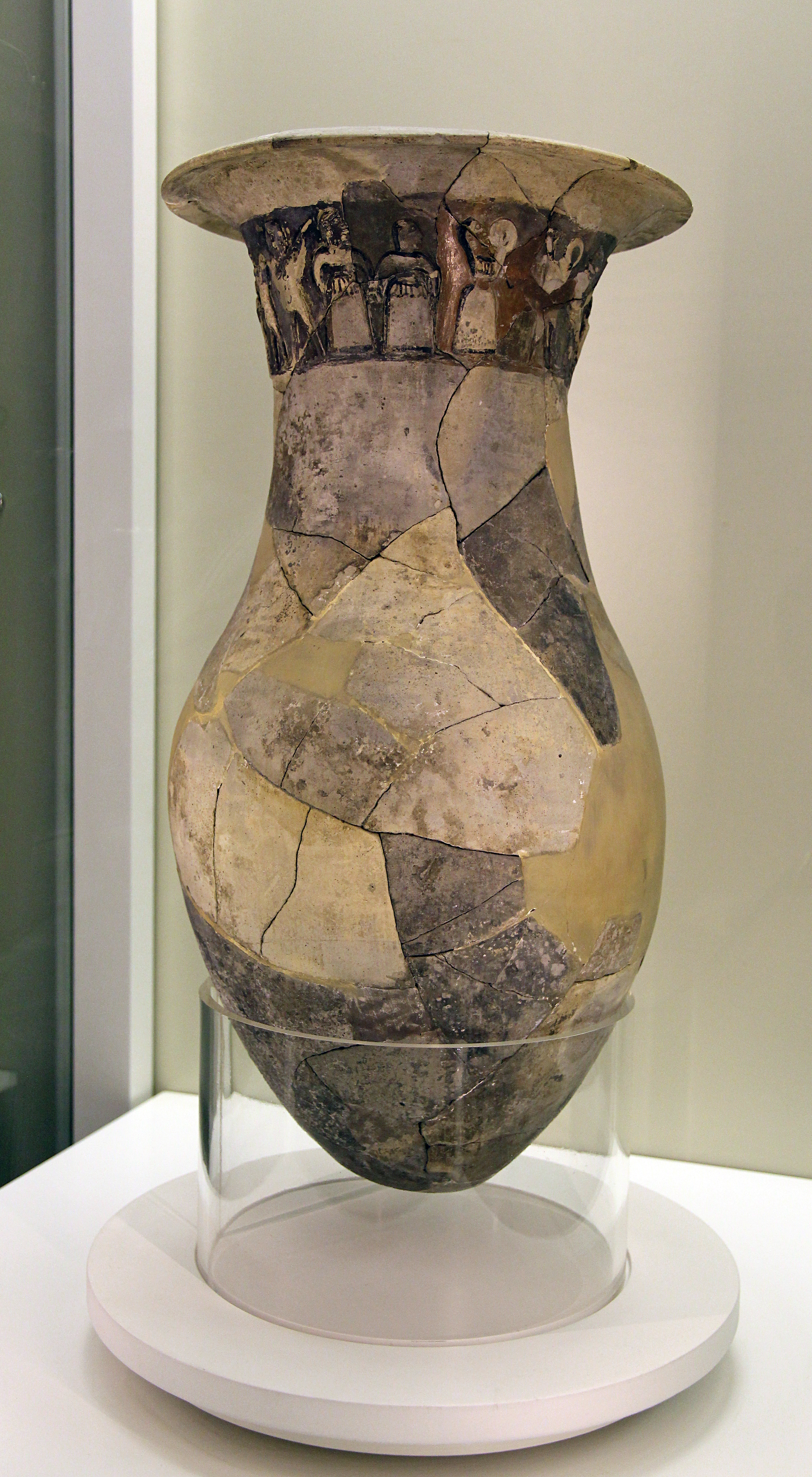
Vase B

The Hüseyindede vases are Early Hittite vases decorated with reliefs, which were found in excavations at Hüseyindede Tepe near Yörüklü in the Turkish province of Çorum. There are fragments of four vases in total. Two of them were nearly complete and were able to be restored. The vases, dated to approximately 1650 BCE, are on display in the Çorum Archaeological Museum.

== Discovery ==
During site inspections by the Turkish archaeologists Tunç Sipahi und Tayfun Yıldırım in 1996, sherds of Early Hittite pottery were found on the surface on the south side of Hüseyindede Tepe among other things. During an emergency excavation in 1997 and further regular excavations from 1998 in collaboration with the Çorum Archaeological Museum, fragments of earthenware pottery and parts of four distinct Hittite relief vases were brought to light. Two of them were found in an ancient storeroom; the other two amongst the surrounding debris. They were restored in the museum. Vase B, the smaller one, which includes an image frieze, was published by Sipahi in 2001, while the restoration of Vase A, which has four image friezes, was still ongoing. Vase A was finally published in 2002 by Yıldırım, at the Hittitology congress in Ankara.

== Background ==
Hittite relief vases have been known since the excavations of Boğazköy (the Hittite capital of Hattusa). Fragments have also been found at Alişar, Alaca Höyük, Eskiyapar, Kabaklı, Elbistan-Karahöyük und Kaman-Kalehöyük. They have generally been dated to the early period of the Hittite Empire, in the first quarter of the second millennium BC. The sole reconstructed example was a four frieze vase from İnandıktepe, which is on display in the Museum of Anatolian Civilizations in Ankara, and a fragment with three friezes from Bitik. The motifs depicted on these vases consist of ritual activities, offering scenes, and festivals with acrobats, dancers and musicians.

== Description ==
The clay of the vases is mixed with gold mica, which is normal in Hittite pottery. They were turned on a potter's wheel. After they were turned, figures made of high-quality clay were attached to the surface of the vases, in friezes. The surfaces were hatched to encourage adhesion. The resulting composition consists of red, black and cream coloured clays.

=== Vase A ===
Rotating view of Vase A

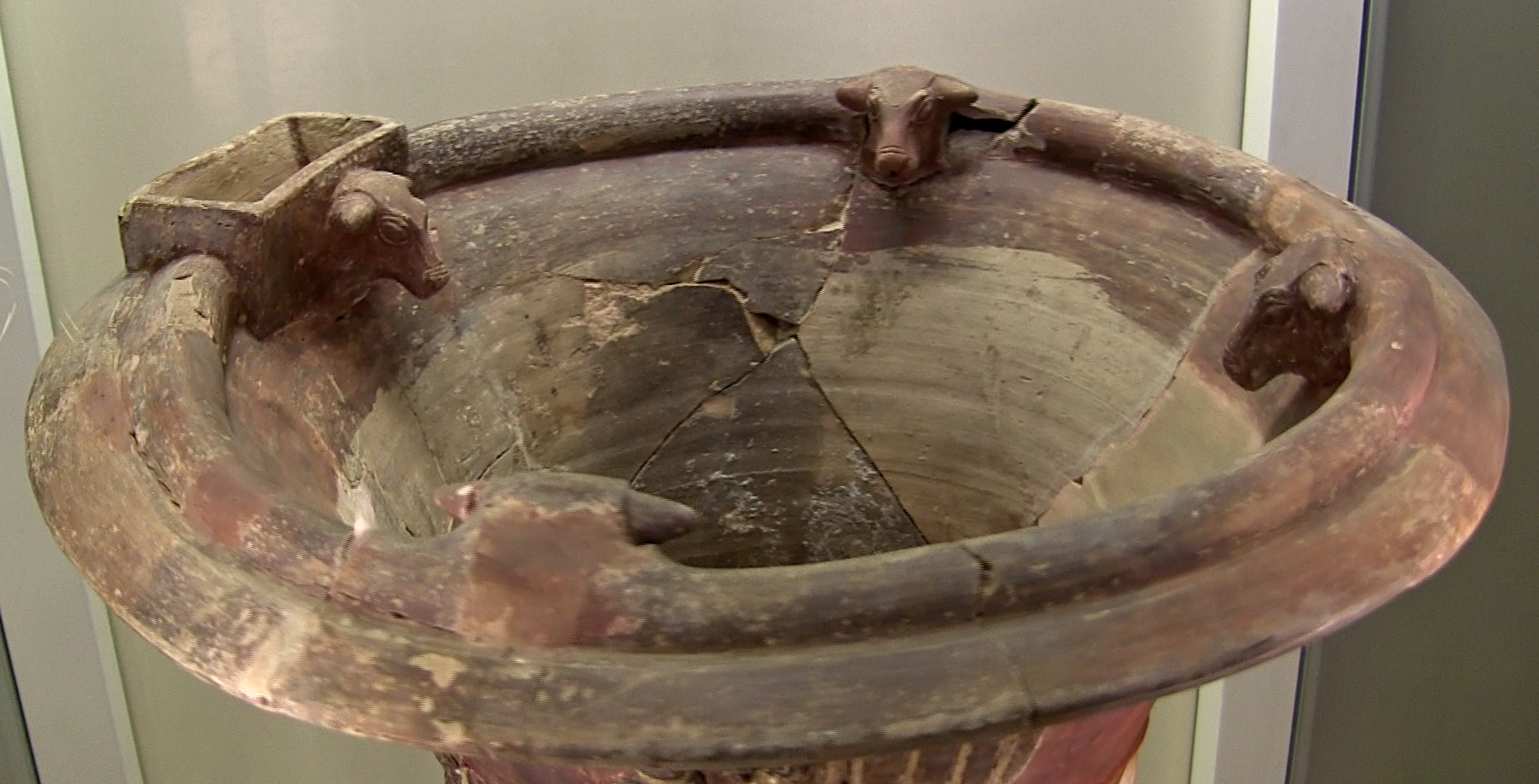
Bulls' heads on the upper lip

Vase A is an example of the Bitik-İnandık-Type, which is to say that it has four bands of frieze. It is 86 cm high, 50 cm in diameter and has four handles. These seem to be the usual dimensions for vases of this type. The upper lip is a tube of clay broken up by a small basin and four bulls' head protomes facing inwards. Liquid might have been poured into the basin in the course of offering ceremonies; from the basin it would flow out of the bull protome's mouth and into the vessel. This structure is also typical of the Bitik-İnandık vase type and is also known from rhyta from Kültepe.

The two lower friezes are divided into four scenes by the handles. The bottom frieze shows four bulls facing in alternate directions, with their heads lowered towards the ground. They are generally linked to the local weather god. Their dynamic posture is unique in Hittite iconography of this time and contrasts with other depictions in which they are led away to be sacrificed. They support the scene above on their shoulders, a feature seen also in seal impressions, a bronze plate from Alaca Höyük, and an ivory plaque from Megiddo. The four scenes of the second layer show an offering procession for a god. The first three images probably show people bringing a roe deer, a red deer and a ram. The two deer are led by a rope by men with a short kilt, while the ram is led by a man at its side. In front of the ram there are two other men, probably priests, in a pose of prayer. In the fourth scene of this layer, the god is shown at right, seated on a high-backed chair, with a worshiper and a musician playing the lyre in front of him. A similar scene is seen on the İnandık vase, but in that case the object of worship is the weather god in the form of a bull, as also on the orthostate reliefs from Alaca Höyük.

The third frieze, which is the widest and most elaborate, shows another procession, which in this case leads to a temple and an altar. The mudbricks of the temple building are shown in different coloured clays. Objects on the roof are probably altars, though Yıldırım alternatively suggests that they are decorative objects or a railing. To the right of the temple, there is an altar, which also recalls the Alaca Höyük orthostate reliefs. Several people approach the building from the left. The last of these is a musician who plays a string instrument which looks a lot like the Turkish Bağlama. In front of him is a woman with a pair of cymbals in her hands. Three women with cult objects precede her. The objects held by the two leftmost women cannot be identified, but Yıldırım thinks the third woman has a type of incense burner which is mentioned in Hittite texts about religious rituals. The procession is led by two men with swords. The final scene in the third frieze, right of the altar, is remarkable. It shows two female figures sitting next to each other on a bed, with a man standing next to it holding up a bowl. The right woman seems to be helping the other with her jewellery or makeup. The left woman, dressed in black, might be a queen or goddess. A possible connection has been suggested with a Hieros gamos. In that case, the standing man would be the divine or royal bridegroom. But we can only speculate about the identity of the depicted individuals, since they have no identifying attributes. According to another interpretation, the left figure is a sculpture, like another sitting figure in a carriage in the uppermost frieze. Textual evidence records that statues in temples were decorated on ceremonial occasions and led in processions.

The fourth and uppermost frieze of the vase is missing a large piece, but depicts another procession. An ox-drawn carriage transports two individuals: a priest and a goddess (or, as mentioned above, a statue of a goddess) who sit on the raised area at the back. The middle part of the carriage, which probably had ritual implements hidden under a cover, is missing. Further to the right, the ox's head and horns are visible, along with the yoke, which is held by a man who guides the animal. The other figures on this level are musicians: two men who play lutes, a woman with cymbals and a female dancer. A male figure, who wears a quiver-like item on his back, is not fully preserved.

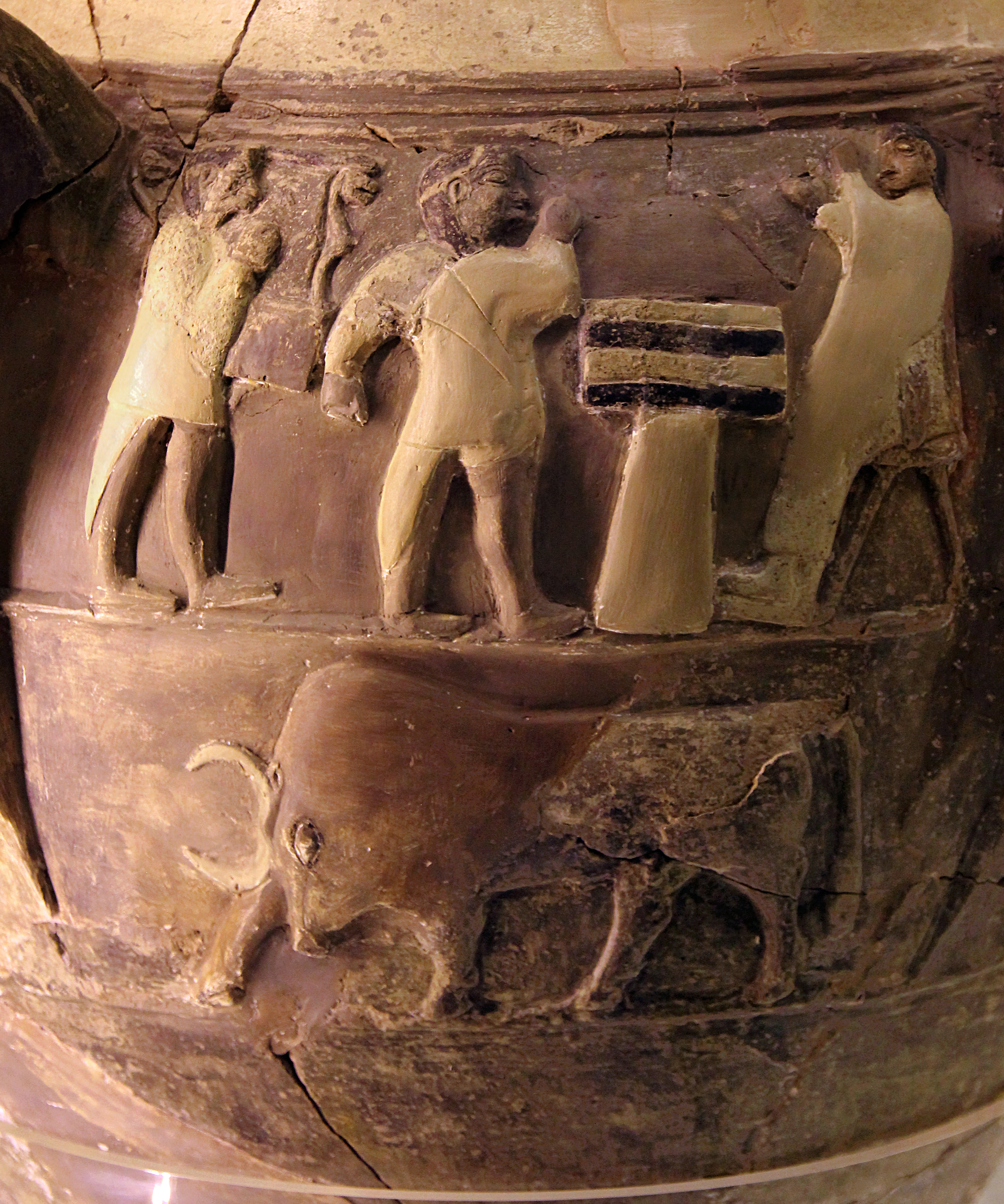
above: Lyre-player, worshipper, altar and seated god; below: a bull.

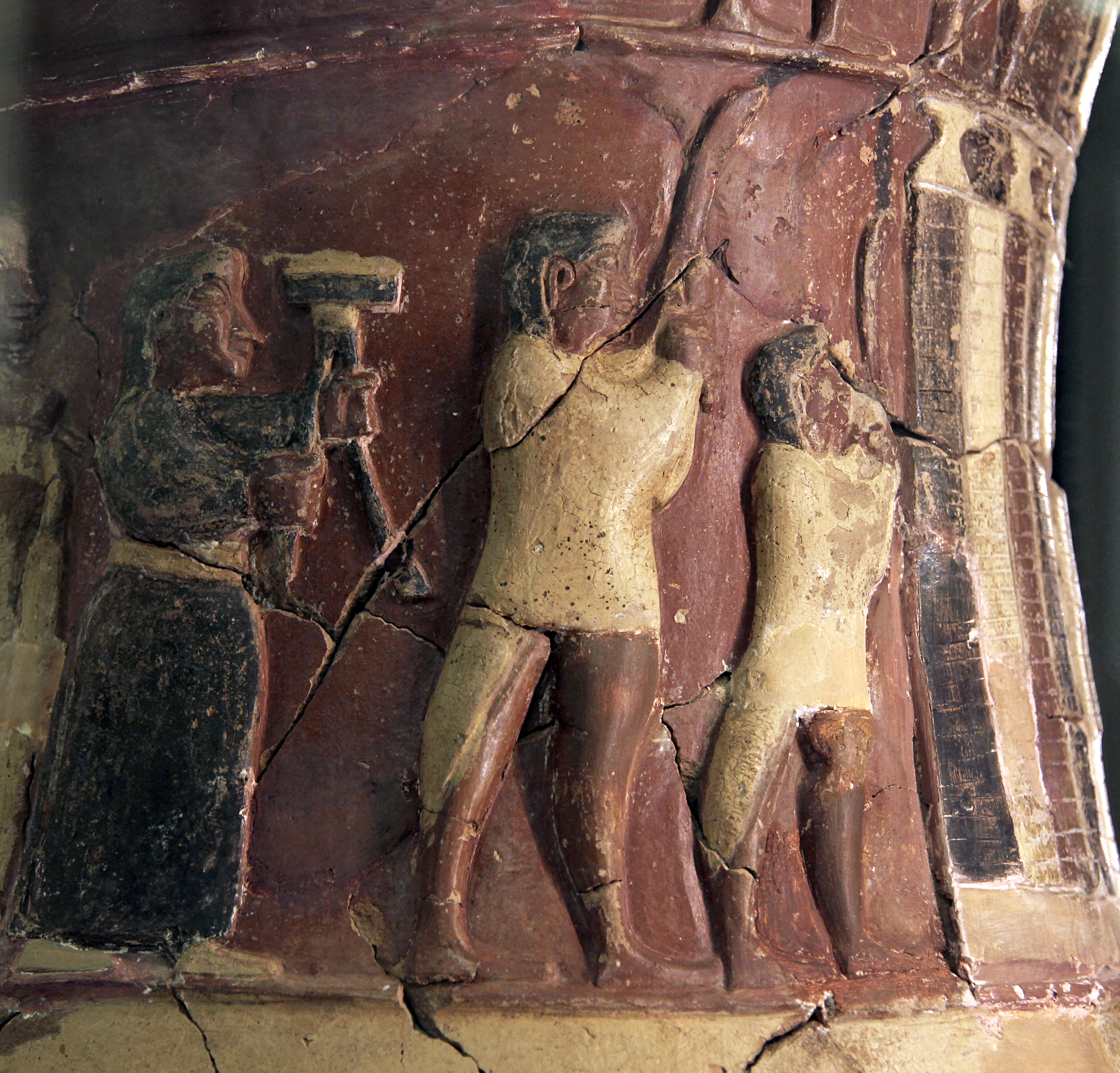
Woman with incense burner and swordsmen

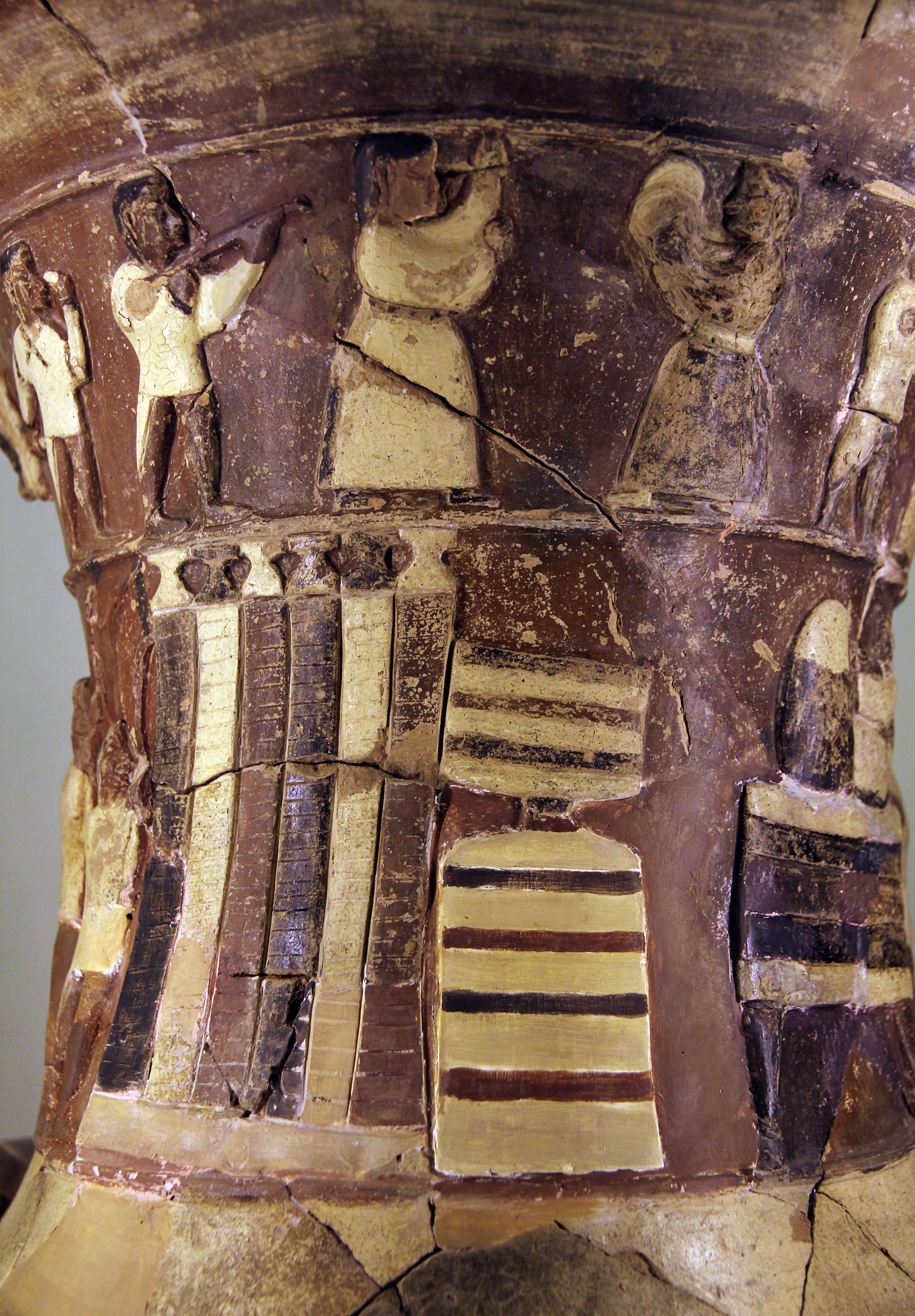
Temple and altar; above: musicians

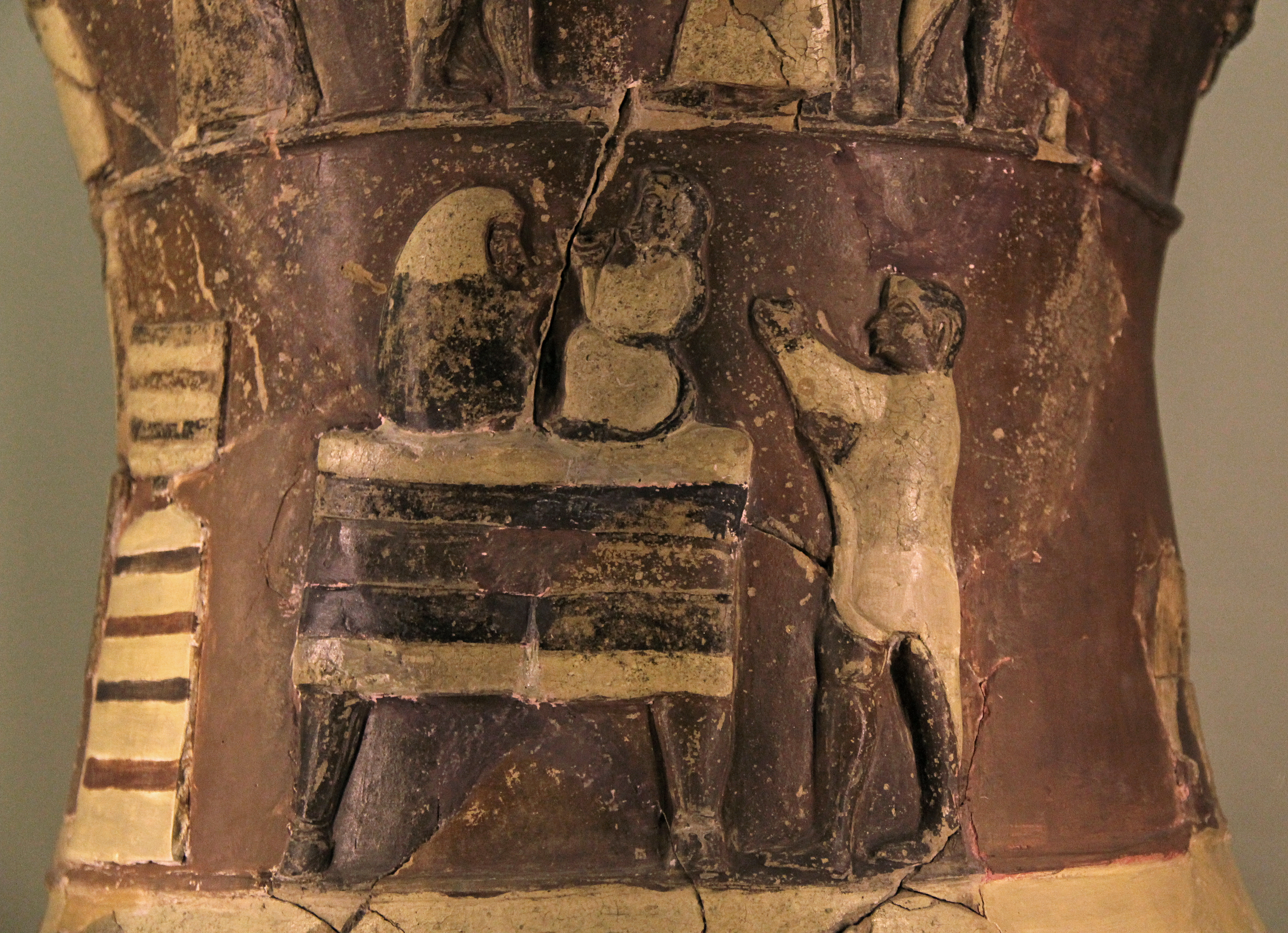
Bed scene

=== Vase B ===
Rotating view of the frieze on Vase B

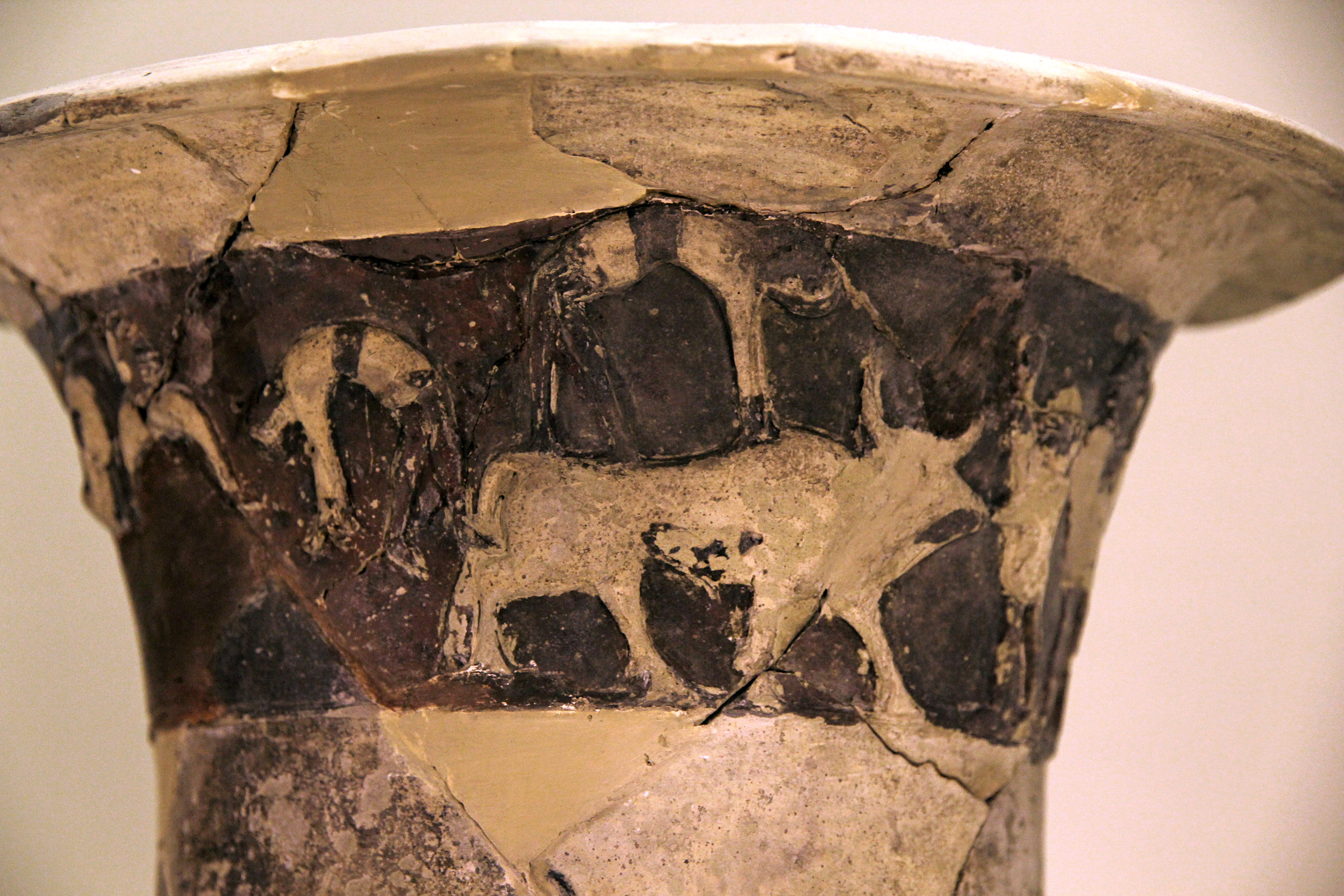
Bull-leaping scene

Vase B has no handles and at 52 cm in height is smaller than Vase A. It has only one frieze, running around the neck, under the projecting rim of the vase. As a result of fire damage after the vase was smashed, the colours have been altered. The original red and cream colours have turned into dark browns, reds and blacks. Only one fragment of the frieze, showing a woman with cymbals, retains the original colours. The band of images is between 7 and 7.5 cm high and is 52 cm long. It depicts an acrobatic scene, accompanied by musicians and dancers.

According to the general view, two frontally depicted women are to be understood as the left margin of the whole scene. They have their hands on their hips and wear long, sweeping dresses with some kind of variegated apron. Sipahi considers them to be dancers, leading a circle dance, similar to the Yalli practiced in modernday East Turkey. A woman and a man playing cymbals come after them. This instrument which is identified with the galgaturi of Hittite texts by Hans Gustav Güterbock (among others), is a common motif in Hittite art, especially on relief vases. Usually the instrument is shown being played by women; the depiction of a male player here is unusual. The next figure is a male musician with a long-necked lute, similar to the modern Saz, which commonly appears on Early Hittite relief vases. The next two men are not fully preserved, but appear to be squatting with cymbals in their hands. The position of their legs suggests a dancing movement. Then there is another standing musician, with only part of the head and the hands holding a cymbal preserved. After that comes the main scene of the frieze.

This central scene shows three acrobats jumping over a bull. The bull faces right and is held by a man with a halter. This man holds an object in his right hand, possibly for providing a rhythm to the performers. Of the leftmost bull-leaper, only arms and the head are preserved. By comparison with similar vases from İnandık and Boğazköy it is assumed that he was shown springing up from a crouching position. A second man is shown doing a backflip, landing his feet on the hindquarters of the bull. The third leaper is shown leaping over the back of the bull. Since the positions of the three leapers are very different, they probably do not represent three phases of a single leap. Rather, they depict simultaneous action, with acrobats and dancers performing all around a quiescent bull. In this way the Hittite image differs from Minoan depictions of bull-leaping, which are well known from Knossos. In depictions from the Aegean athletes are shown jumping over a charging bull's head or flank, but in this case a ritual performance on and around a calm bull seems to be depicted.

=== Fragments ===
Three additional fragments of a vase of the Bitik-İnandık-Type (i.e. with four friezes) show a male figure, probably a cook, with two-handled cooking pots of a type known from the Assyrian trading colonies and the Hittite period. On the fragments of a distinct vase of the same type, a divinity, a lion and another figure are depicted.

== Bibliography ==
- Tayfun Yıldırım: "Yörüklü/Hüseyindede. Eine neue hethitische Siedlung im Südwesten von Çorum." Istanbuler Mitteilungen 50, 2001, pp. 43–62.
- Tunç Sipahi: "Eine althethitische Reliefvase vom Hüseyindede Tepesi." Istanbuler Mitteilungen 50, 2001a, pp. 63–85.
- Tunç Sipahi: "New Evidence from Anatolia Regarding Bull-Leaping Scenes in the Art of the Aegean and the Near East." Anatolica 27, 2001b, pp. 107–125.
- Tayfun Yıldırım, “Hüseyindede Tepesinde Bulunan Yeni Bir Kült Vazosu”, V.Uluslararası Hititoloji Kongresi Bildirileri, Çorum 02-08 Eylül 2002. Ankara 2005, pp. 761–774, fig. 1–4.
- Piotr Taracha: "Bull-leaping on a Hittite vase. New light on Anatolian and Minoan religion." Archeologia (Warszawa) 53, 2002, pp. 7–20.
- Tayfun Yıldırım: "Music in Hüseyindede/Yörüklü: Some New Musical Scenes on the Second Hittite Relief Vase" Anadolu Araştırmaları / Jahrbuch für Kleinasiatische Forschung 16, 2002, pp. 591–600. PDF
- Tayfun Yıldırım: "New scenes on the second relief vase from Hüseyindede" Studi micenei ed egeo anatolici 5, 2008 pp. 837–850
- Jurgen Seeher: "The Plateau: The Hittites" in Sharon R. Steadman, Gregory McMahon (ed.) The Oxford Handbook of Ancient Anatolia: (10,000–323 BCE). OUP 2011: 376–392.
