= Bread pakora =

Indian deep-fried snack

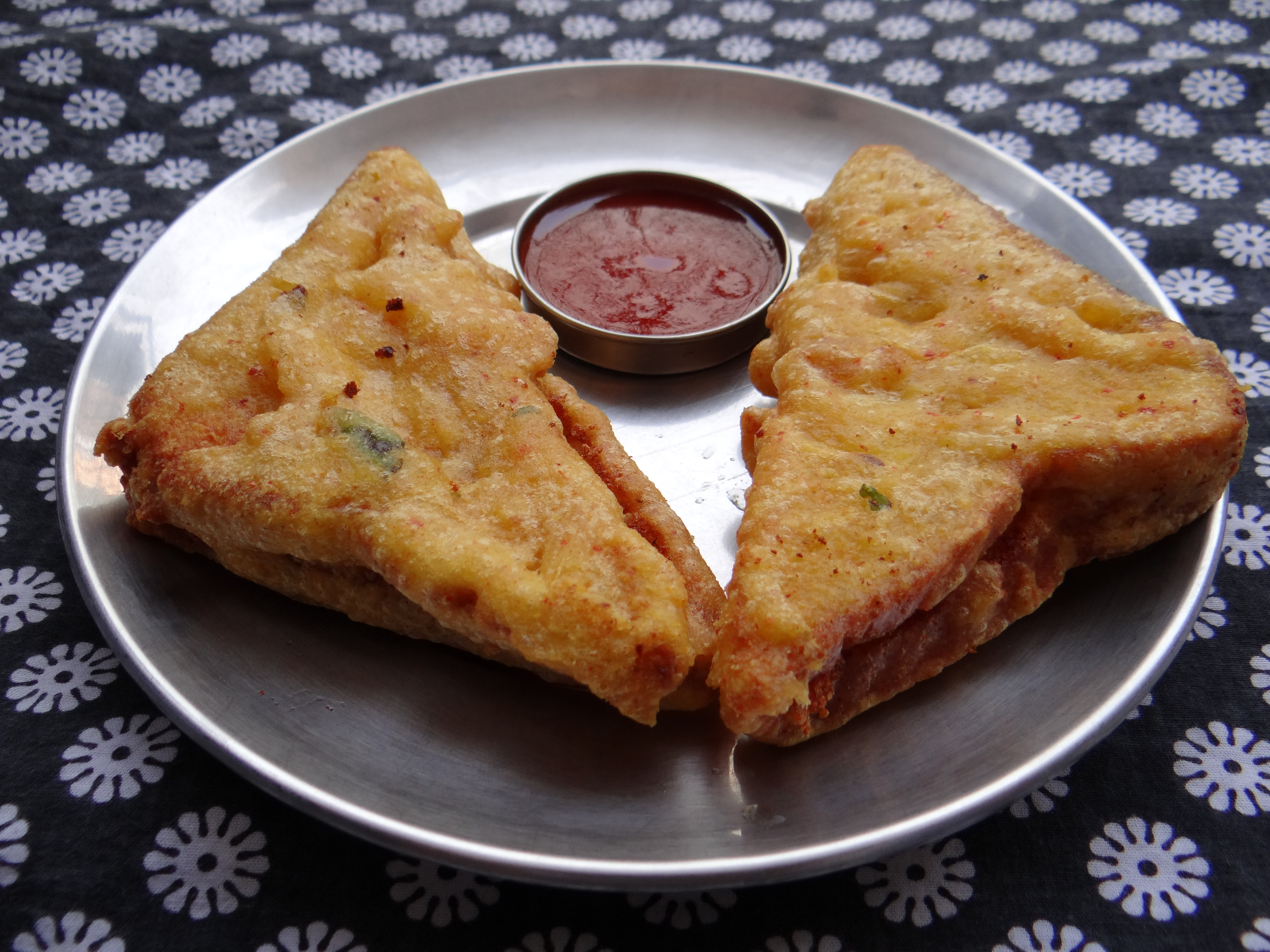
- Bread Pakoda with Ketchup
- Course: Snack
- Place of origin: India
- Associated cuisine: India
- Serving temperature: Hot or warm
- Main ingredients: bread slices, gram flour, mashed potato & Indian spices

Bread pakora is an Indian fried snack (pakora or fritter). It is also known as bread bhaji (or bajji). A common street food, it is made from bread slices, gram flour, and spices among other ingredients.

The snack is prepared by dipping triangular bread slices in a spicy gram flour batter and frying them. Stuffing such as mashed potatoes is common. It can be deep-fried or pan-fried, and is served with chutneys or ketchup.

== Etymology ==
The word pakoṛā is derived from the Sanskrit word पक्ववट pakvavaṭa, a compound of pakva ('cooked') and vaṭa ('a small lump') or its derivative vaṭaka, 'a round cake made of pulse fried in oil or ghee'. The word Bhajji is derived from the Sanskrit word Bharjita meaning fried.

== Preparation ==
Bread pakora is made by frying a slice of bread dipped in a spiced gram flour batter. It is often served with chutney, like tamarind or cilantro-lime.

== Variation ==
One variation of bread pakora is adding mashed potatoes to create a sandwich with two slices of bread and then frying it.

== See also ==
- List of chickpea dishes – Foods using chickpeas or their flour as a primary ingredient
- List of Indian dishes
- List of Pakistani dishes – Culinary traditions of Pakistan
- List of street foods
