= Çorum Clock Tower =

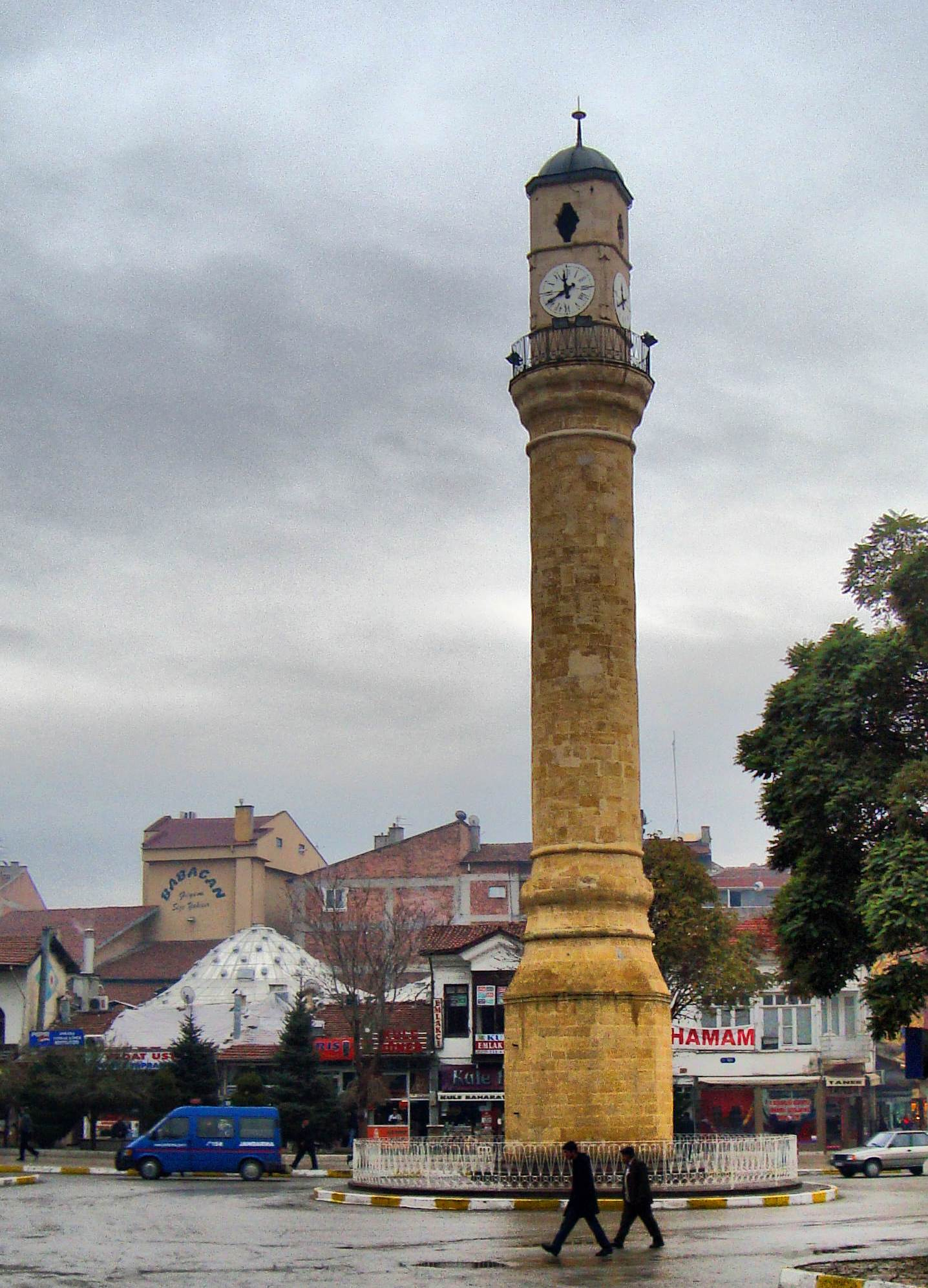

General information
- Type: Clock tower
- Location: Çorum, Turkey
- Completed: 1894
- Height: 27.5 m (90 ft 2 1/2 in)

Çorum Clock Tower is a clock tower in the Central district of Çorum province, Turkey. It was built either in 1894 according to Çorum Provincial Culture and Tourism Directorate and Meltem Cansever, or in 1896 according to Hakkı Acun. Built by Seven-Eight Hasan Pasha, the tower is 27.5 metres (90 ft) high and 3.9 metres (13 ft) in diameter.
