= Hittite University =

Public university in Çorum, Turkey

Hitit University
- Hitit Üniversitesi
- Motto: The Sun of Knowledge Enlightening the Civilization
- Type: Public
- Established: 2006
- Vice-Chancellor: Halil İbrahim Şimşek
- Rector: Ali Osman Öztürk
- Academic staff: 592
- Administrative staff: 347
- Students: 15,838
- Undergraduates: 8245
- Postgraduates: 1,214
- Doctoral students: 116
- Location: Hitit Üniversitesi Rektörlüğü Kuzey Kampüs 19030 Çorum/Türkiye, Çorum, Turkey
- Colors: Orange, blue, white
- Website: Official website

Hitit University (Turkish: Hitit Üniversitesi) is a university in Çorum, Turkey, founded in 2006. The university was affiliated to Gazi University before splitting into an independent university, with existing educational units affiliated to this newly founded university in 2006.

Hitit University comprises three institutes, eight faculties, two schools and seven vocational schools. The university provides education to 6,263 short cycle students, 8,245 bachelor students, 1,214 master's degree students and 116 PhD students through 592 academic staff and 347 administrative staff.

== Academic units ==
=== Faculties ===
Faculty of Arts and Sciences

- Archaeology
- Ancient Languages and Cultures
- Anthropology
- Art History
- Biology
- Chemistry
- History
- Mathematics
- Molecular Biology and Genetics
- Physics
- Psychology
- Sociology
- Turkish Language and Literature
- Western Languages and Literature

Faculty of Economics and Administrative Sciences

- Banking and Finance
- Business Management
- Economics
- International Trade and Logistics
- International Relations
- Public Finance
- Political Science and Public Administration
- Management of Health Institutions

Faculty of Divinity

- Basic Islamic Sciences
- Islamic History and Arts
- Philosophy and Religion Sciences
- Elementary Religion and Morals Education

Faculty of Engineering

- Chemical Engineering
- Civil Engineering
- Computer Engineering
- Electrical and Electronic Engineering
- Food Engineering
- Industrial Engineering
- Mechanical Engineering
- Metallurgy and Materials Engineering
- Polymer Engineering

Faculty of Medicine

- Surgical Medicine Sciences
- Internal Medicine Sciences
- Basic Medicine Sciences

Faculty of Fine Arts, Design and Architecture

- Architecture
- Art
- Art and Design
- Ceramics
- Music
- Plastic Arts
- Textile and Fashion Design
- Graphic Design
- Interior Architecture and Environmental Design
- Visual Communication Design
- Industrial Design
- Landscape Architecture

Faculty of Veterinary Medicine

Faculty of Tourism

=== Institutes ===
Institute of Social Sciences

- Archeology
- History
- Business Management
- Economics
- Basic Islamic Sciences
- Islamic History and Arts
- Philosophy and Religion Sciences
- Physical Education and Sports
- Political Science and Public Administration
- Political and Social Sciences

Doctorate Programs

- Business Management
- Economics
- Basic Islamic Sciences
- Philosophy and Religion Sciences
- Physical Education and Sports

Institute of Science

- Biology
- Chemistry
- Physics
- Mathematics
- Chemical Engineering
- Mechanical Engineering
- Food Engineering

Doctorate Programs

- Mechanical Engineering
- Chemical Engineering

Institute of Health Sciences

=== Schools ===
- Physical Education and Sports School
- Coaching Education
- Physical Education and Sports
- Recreation
- Sport Management
- Health School
- Child Development
- Nursing
- Nutrition and Dietetics
- Physiotherapy and Rehabilitation
- Social Services

=== Vocational Schools ===
- Vocational School of Technical Sciences
- Vocational School of Social Sciences
- İskilip Vocational School
- Osmancık Ömer Derindere Vocational School
- Sungurlu Vocational School
- Alaca Vocational School
- Health Services Vocational School
- School of Foreign Languages

== Academic Research and Application Centers ==
- Alternative Energy Systems and Biomedical Application and Research Center
- Aquaculture and Water Sports Application and Research Center
- Black Sea Archaeology Application and Research Center
- Continuing Education Application and Research Center
- Distance Learning Application and Research Center
- Food Product Safety and Agricultural Application and Research Center
- Hacı Bektaş-ı Veli Application and Research Center
- Hittite Civilization Application and Research Center
- Scientific and Technical Application and Research Center
- Women and Family Affairs Application and Research Center
- Experimental Consumer Research and Application Center

== Hitit University Library ==
The library offers computer-supported services.

Hitit University library collection

- Printed publication 46,035
- e-Journal 43,700
- E-Book 155,924
- Periodicals 1,178
- Databases 50

The Yordam Library Automation System enables the users to scan the university catalogue or use online databases through the Hitit University webpage without going to the library.

The library enables visually-disabled students to benefit from printed material by scanning via Eye-Pal scanning system, with the pages read to them by means of Jaws 13 program and 689 audio books. Two computers are allocated to the visually-disabled students and assigned staffs provide them with guidance. The visually-disabled students can access thousands of audio books within the scope of protocol between Hitit University and Boğaziçi University Laboratory for Individuals with Visual Disabilities (GETEM).

== Academic research journals ==
The university publishes biannual journals:

- The Journal of Divinity Faculty of Hitit University, first published in 2002, is a refereed academic journal including academic studies on Islam, world religions, theology, and social sciences related to those fields.
- The Journal of Hitit University Social Sciences Institute is a refereed journal which has been published since 2008,
- Hünkar the Journal of Academic Researches of Alevism Bektashism is an internationally refereed journal published by Hacı Bektaş-ı Veli Application and Research Center,
- Hittite Journal of Science & Engineering is an international, peer-reviewed, multidisciplinary journal containing original research papers, review articles, short communications and letters in English.

== International vision ==
The university carries out student exchange programs and projects, international academic collaborations, conferences and events worldwide. Having been involved in the Erasmus Programme and the Mevlana program, Hitit University has opened an opportunity to widen transnational cooperation between higher education institutions by promoting mobility for students and teaching staff.

With the aim of improving recognition, the departments of Mechanical Engineering and Chemical Engineering of Hitit University Faculty of Engineering were accredited by Association for Evaluation and Accreditation of Engineering Programs (MÜDEK).

An international symposium on Meskhetian Turks in the 70th Year of Exile was hosted by Hitit University with the attendance of national and international participants on 14–15 November 2014. Additionally, the 4th International Turkish World Economic Forum was organized with the collaboration of the University of Foreign Languages and Professional Career and Hitit University in 7–9 May 2015. Moreover, Hitit University hosted the 12th World University Wrestling Championships (WUC) between 25–30 October 2016 and the European Universities Futsal Championship (Futsal’2017).

== Student life ==
During the annual Spring Fest of the university, concerts, dance performances, folk dance shows, and contests are organized. Hitit University has four indoor and nine outdoor sports facilities, for handball, basketball, volleyball, and football teams. Sports activities such as table-tennis, court tennis, fitness, cross country and wrestling are also performed. The university has 83 student clubs.
