= Hüseyindede Tepe =

Early Hittite site in the Sungurlu district, Çorum Province, Turkey

Coordinates: 40.13°N 34.34°E

Hüseyindede Tepe is an Early Hittite site in the Sungurlu district of Turkey's Çorum Province, about 2 km south of a town called Yörüklü (pop. 2,988 as of 2000). The site has been surveyed in 1997, leading to the discovery of the Hüseyindede vases, one of which depicts dancers and processions and the other of which shows thirteen figures, with two in the act of somersaulting over a bull. A third Hittite vase depicting dancers, musicians and acrobats was found in İnandık. The artwork is in Anatolian style and not an import from Minoan Crete, the area mostly associated with bull-leaping.

== Bibliography ==
- Yildirim, Tayfun, Yörüklü/Hüseyindede: Eine neue hethitische Siedlung im Südwesten von Çorum, Istanbuler Mitteilungen (ISSN 0341-9142) 50 (2000), 43–62.
- Sipahi, Tunç, New Evidence From Anatolia Regarding Bull Leaping Scenes in the Art of the Aegean and the Near East, Anatolica 27 (2001), 107–125.
