= Topik =

Armenian chickpea-based dish

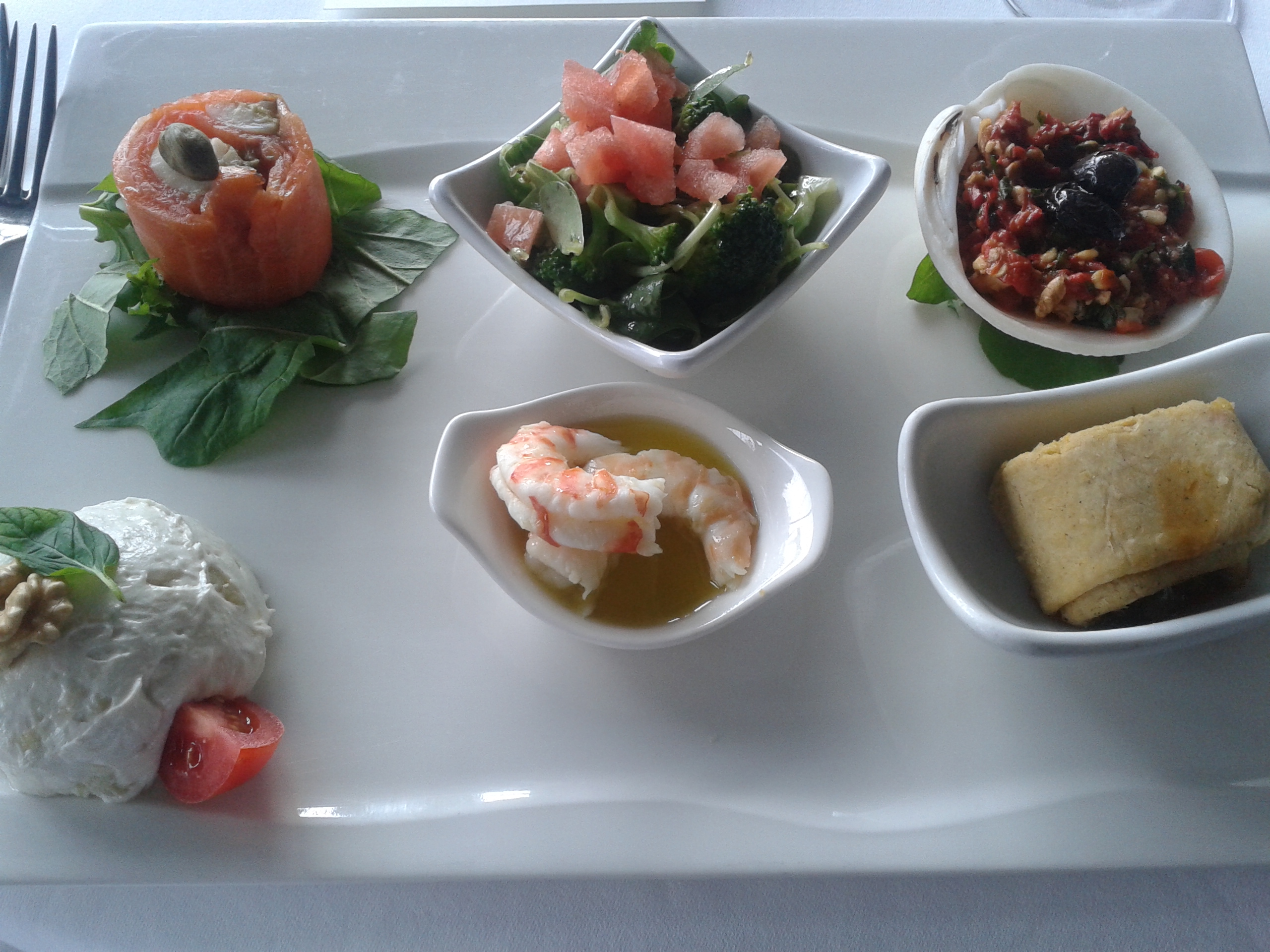
- Topik (bottom right) in Istanbul, made into a casserole-shape
- Region or state: Caucasus
- Associated cuisine: Armenian cuisine
- Main ingredients: Chickpea
- Ingredients generally used: Potatoes, flour, onions, nuts, currants, tahini

Topik or topig (Armenian: Թոփիկ) is an Armenian dish, sometimes thought of as a vegetarian meatball, consisting of a chickpea-based paste, usually mixed with potatoes or flour, surrounding a filling of onions, nuts, and currants, and flavored with herbs, spices, and tahini.

Topik is primarily a Lenten dish and is often served at Michink (the middle of Lent).
