= Guasanas =

Dish from Mexico consisting of green chickpeas, water and salt

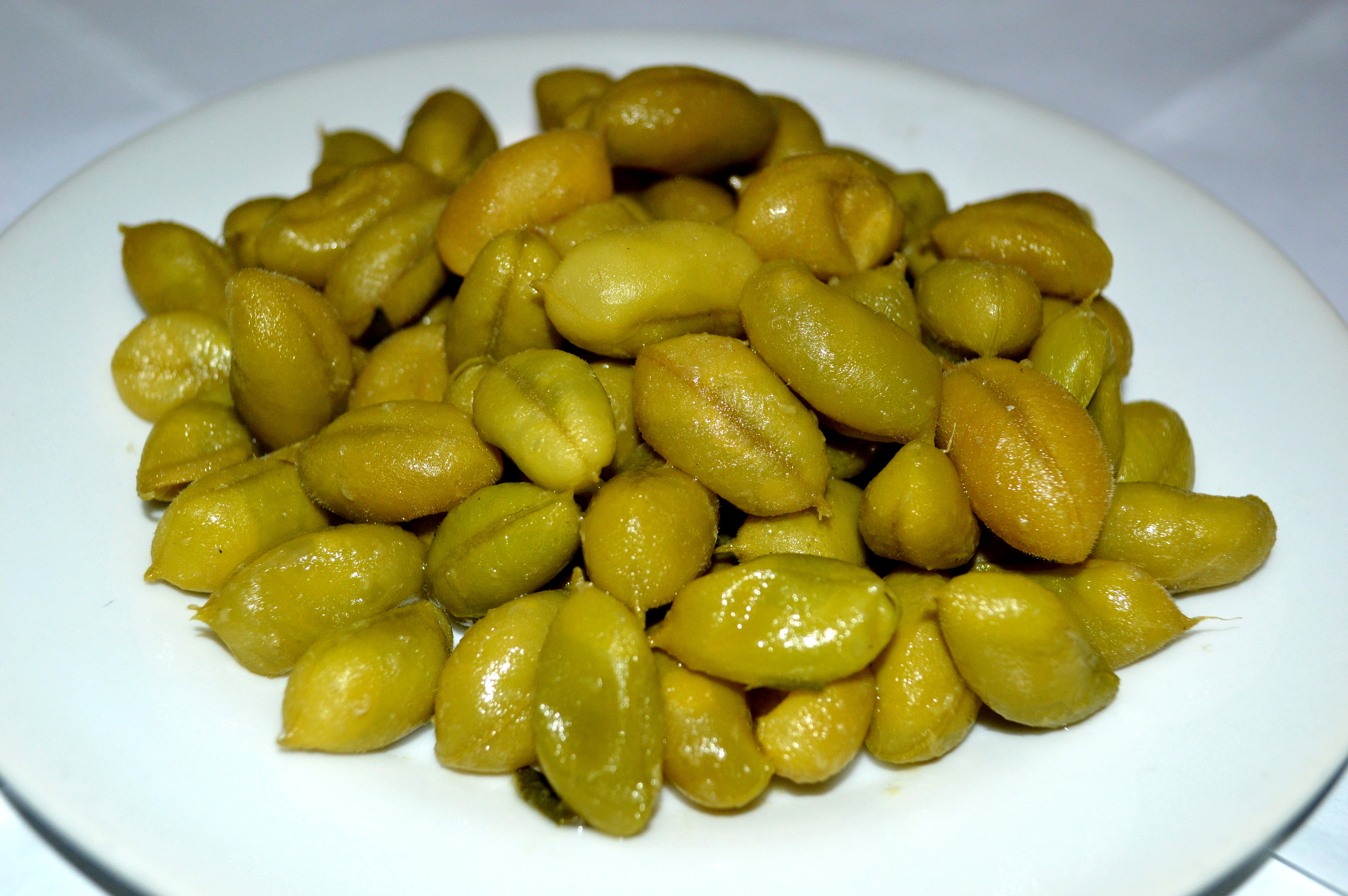
- Guasanas
- Alternative names: Guasanas
- Place of origin: Mexico
- Main ingredients: Chickpea, water, salt

Guasanas is a dish from Mexico consisting of green chickpeas, water and salt. The chickpeas are steamed and shelled before serving.

Guasanas are green chickpeas. They come from a legume plant of about 50 cm in height, it has small white flowers and it sprouts small pods that contain about two to three guasana seeds.
