= Çorum Archaeological Museum =

Museum in Çorum, Turkey

Coordinates: 40.5411°N 34.9511°E

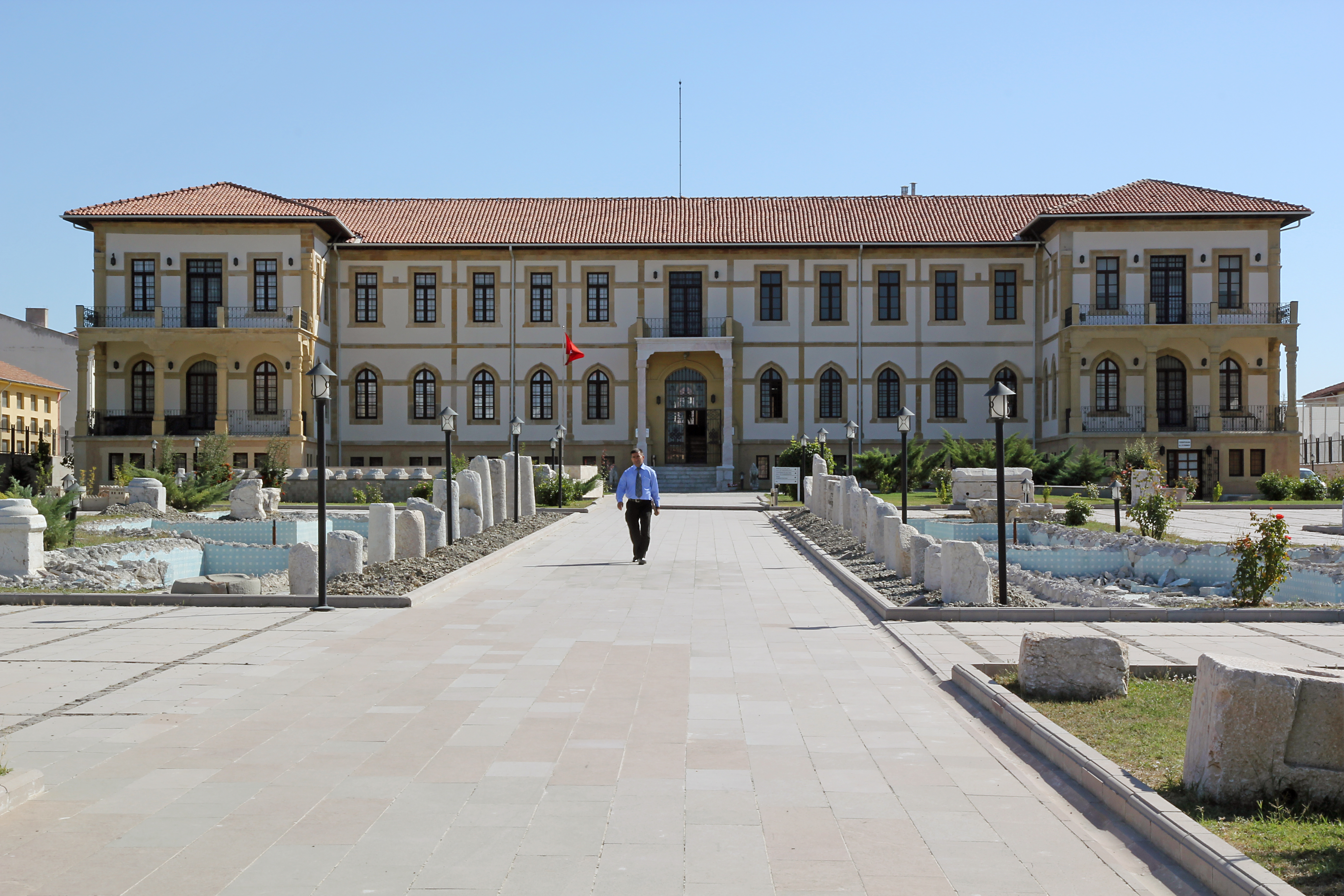
Çorum Archaeological Museum

Çorum Archaeological Museum is an archaeological museum in Çorum, Turkey. It was formally established in 1968, with items found in Alacahöyük, Boğazköy, Ortaköy, Eskiyapar, Pazarlı, Kuşsaray and Alişar Höyük.

== Collection ==
The collection, amounting to 12,337 pieces in 1997, is divided into four principal areas. The First Hall and corridor contains Hellenistic, Roman and Byzantine era "coins, ceramics, glass perfume cups and lachrymatories, figurines and statuettes, offering cups, steles, sarcophagi and column capitals and jewellery", the Second Hall contains numerous jugs, vases, rythones and crucibles, cap-shaped discs and seals from the Hittite and Phrygian periods, while the Third and Fourth Halls contain rugs, jewellery and items of clothing, weapons, scriptures and wood and metal objects dating to the Seljuk and Ottoman eras. The garden contains a fountain with a statue of a bull.
