= Leblebi =

Turkish toasted chickpea snack

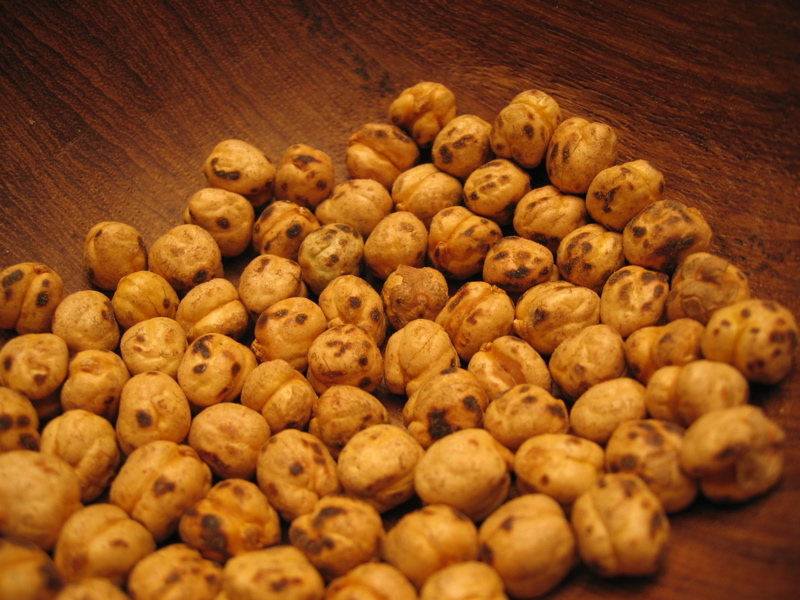
- Leblebi, dehulled
- Type: Snack
- Main ingredients: Chickpeas

Leblebi, nondehulled
Nutritional value per 100 g (3.5 oz)
- Energy: 1,493 kJ (357 kcal)
- Carbohydrates: 58.06 g
- Dietary fiber: 7.74 g
- Fat: 5.04 g
- Saturated: 0.74 g
- Protein: 19.94 g
- ^{†}Percentages estimated using US recommendations for adults.

Leblebi (Turkish: leblebi; Mesopotamian Arabic: لبلبي, romanized: leblebi; Arabic: قضامة, romanized: Qdameh, Qudamah; Persian: نخودچی, romanized: Nokhodchi; Sicilian: Càlia; Greek: στραγάλι; Armenian: լեբլեբուBulgarian: леблебия) is a snack made from roasted chickpeas, common and popular in Iran, Palestine, Jordan, Syria, Lebanon, Iraq, Armenia, Turkey and Bulgaria and sometimes seasoned with salt, hot spices, dried cloves, or candy coated.
