= Chickpea noghl =

Iranian, Afghan, and Turkish confection

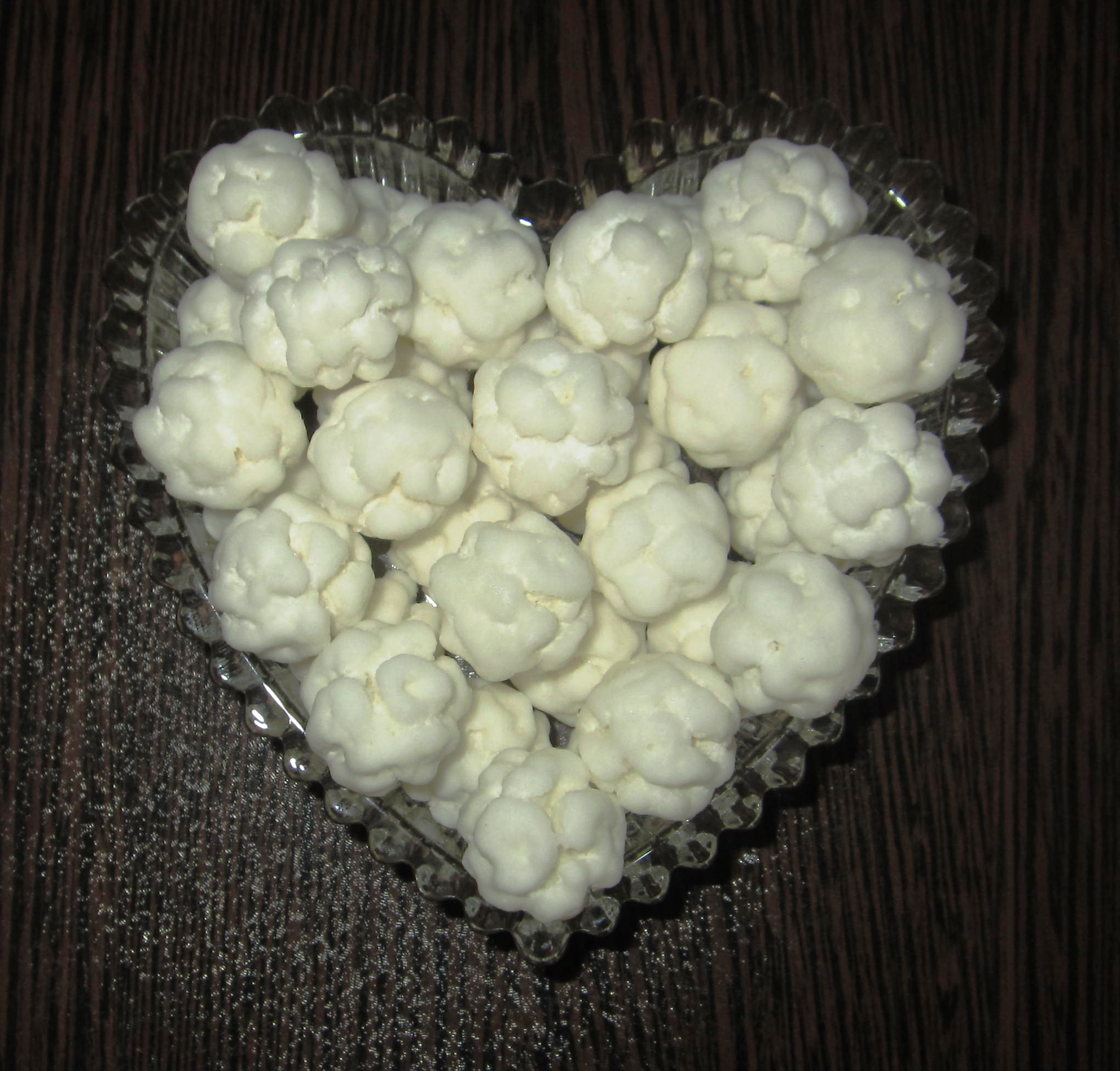
- Alternative names: Leblebi şekeri
- Type: Confectionery
- Place of origin: Iran
- Region or state: Iran, Turkey and Afghanistan
- Main ingredients: Chickpea, sugar, water, rose water

Chickpea noghl (leblebi şekeri), or sugar-coated chickpea, is a traditional Iranian, Afghan, and Turkish confection. It is made by boiling sugar with water and rose water and then coating roasted chickpeas in the mixture.
