= Tatlı =

Tatlı or Tatly or Tatlu may refer to:

- Tatlı, Agstafa, Azerbaijan
- Tatlı, Samukh, Azerbaijan
- Tatlı, Sungurlu
