= Beylice =

Beylice can refer to:

- Beylice, Sungurlu
- Beylice, Tarsus
