= Mahmut Ustaosmanoğlu =

Turkish Sufi sheikh and leader (1929–2022)

Personal life
- Born: 1929 Of, Trabzon, Turkey
- Died: 23 June 2022 (aged 93) Üsküdar, Istanbul, Turkey
- Children: Ahmet Ustaosmanoğlu; Abdullah Ustaosmanoğlu; Fatma Muratoğlu
- Parents: Ali Ustaosmanoğlu (father); Fatma Ustaosmanoğlu (mother)
- Main interest: Sufism

Religious life
- Religion: Islam
- Denomination: Sunni
- Jurisprudence: Hanafi
- Tariqa: Naqshbandi
- Creed: Maturidi

Muslim leader
- Students: Ahmet Mahmut Ünlü, Metin Balkanlıoğlu
- Influenced by: Abu al-Hassan al-Kharaqani, Baha' al-Din Naqshband, Ahmad Sirhindi, Abu Hanifa, Abu Mansur al-Maturidi, Mirza Mazhar Jan-e-Janaan
- Influenced: İsmailağa
- Awards: 34th, The 500 Most Influential Muslims (2022)

Mahmut Ustaosmanoğlu (1929 – 23 June 2022), also known as Mahmud Effendi and known to his followers as "Effendi Hazretleri", was a Turkish Sufi Sheikh and the leader of the influential İsmailağa Jamia of the Naqshbandi-Khalidiyya centered in Çarşamba, Istanbul.

== Early life ==
Ustaosmanoğlu was born in a village Imam in Miço (now Tavşanlı) village of the Of district.

In his childhood, Ustaosmanoğlu is known for never missing any Tahajjud prayers every night, prayed 5 times a day, never missing any prayers and always have big interests for knowledge. Later on in his teenage years, he went to a city called Kayseri for seeking knowledge (Ilm). He followed the lessons from a popular local Alim (scholar) Named Tesbihcizade Ahmed Effendi and Calekli Haci Dursun Effendi.

In the month of Ramadan 1951, he was appointed as a Imam in a local masjid in the Divriği district of Sivas province. He attracted the attention of the people around him with his religious talks and knowledge.

He moved later on in his upcoming years to the city of Bandırma while he was a military officer, at the same time, he met Ahiskali Ali Haydar Effendi in Tekke mosque Bandırma and followed lessons for seeking more knowledge.

He became a hafiz of the Quran under his father by the age of 6 and continued his madrasa education, gaining his ijazah by the age of 16. Afterward he married his cousin and started his work as an Imam.

He had three children from his wife, Ahmet, Abdullah and Fatma. After the death of his first wife Zehra Ustaosmanoğlu in 1993, he married Müşerref Ustaosmanoğlu the same year. His daughter Fatma Muratoğlu died on 28 December 2003.

Ustaosmanoğlu is also known for being the teacher of Ahmet Mahmut Ünlü and Metin Balkanlıoğlu in early 1980s.

== Naqshbandi order ==
In 1952, Ustaosmanoğlu met Ahıskalı Ali Haydar Efendi (Gürbüzler), a Naqshbandi sheikh who became his murshid. Ali Haydar Efendi appointed him as the imam of the İsmailağa Mosque in 1954. By the year 1960, Ustaosmanoğlu's life had its greatest turn after Ali Haydar Efendi's demise and he became the leader of the path (tariqa). In 1996, he retired as the imam of the İsmailağa Musjid.

== Later life ==
Ustaosmanoğlu tried to keep a low profile in the following years, especially after the 1997 memorandum, but his relations came under the public spotlight with a series of internal strife in the Naqshbandi order. His son-in-law Hızır Ali Muratoğlu was murdered in 1998 and in 2006, a retired imam named Bayram Ali Öztürk was murdered in the mosque and the man who stabbed him to death was lynched by the congregation.

Ustaosmanoğlu is known for having dialogues and relations with many politicians including Necmettin Erbakan, Abdullah Gül, Ahmet Davutoğlu, Muhsin Yazıcıoğlu, Recai Kutan and many more.

Recep Tayyip Erdoğan was known to maintain close relations with Ustaosmanoğlu. Erdoğan paid a highly publicized visit to Ustaosmanoğlu the night before the presidential election in 2014.

In 2010, Ustaosmanoğlu was given the "Outstanding Service to Islam" award and the title of "Reformer of the 15th century" at the "International Symposium on Service to Humanity" organized in Istanbul by the Marifet Association, affiliated with the İsmailağa Community, of which he is the leader.

Ustaosmanoğlu died on 23 June 2022 after two weeks of hospitalization for an infection. At his funeral, his son Ahmet Ustaosmanoğlu announced that his father was succeeded by Hasan Kılıç.

== Publications ==
- Tafsir Ruhul Furqan (19 Volumes)
- Sohbetler (9 Volumes) (Written version of sermons he gave in Sultan Selim Mosque)
- Sohbetler Risale-i Kudsiyye (2 Volumes)
- Lectures during Umrah
- al-Fatiha Commentary
- Ayet'l-Kursi and Amene'r-Rasûlu Commentary
- Virtues of the Holy Quran and the Etiquette of Reading
- The Holy Quran and the Commentary of the Holy Quran Explanations
- Khatm-i Hâce of Our Conversations
- Irşadü'l-Muridin
- Mektubat-ı Mahmudiyye
- Tenbihat
