= Asayish =

Asayish (also spelled Asayiş), the Kurdish term for "security", or Asayesh may refer to:

- Asayish (Kurdistan Region), the official security organisation of the autonomous Kurdistan Region of Iraq
- Asayish (Democratic Autonomous Administration of North and East Syria), the police force of the cantons within the Democratic Federation of Northern Syria (Rojava)
- Asayish (Sinjar District), the police force of Sinjar
- Asayesh, a village in Iran's East Azerbaijan Province
- Dehkadeh-ye Asayesh, a village in Iran's West Azerbaijan Province
- Asayiş, Sungurlu
