= İmirli =

İmirli can refer to:

- İmirli, Sungurlu
- Əmirli
