= Korku =

Korku may refer to:

- Korku people, a Munda people of Madhya Pradesh, India
- Korku language, their Munda (Austro-Asiatic) language
- Körkü, Sungurlu, a village in Turkey
