= Derekışla =

Derekışla can refer to:

- Derekışla, Bala
- Derekışla, Sungurlu
