= Amirli (disambiguation) =

Amirli or Amirlu may refer to:

- Amirli, Iraq
- Amirlu, Iran
- Əmirli, Azerbaijan
