= Cevheri, Sungurlu =

Village in Turkey

Cevheri
- Neighbourhood
- Location in Turkey
- Coordinates: 40°12′N 34°26′E
- Country: Turkey
- Province: Çorum
- District: Sungurlu
- Municipality: Sungurlu
- Population (2022): 262
- Time zone: UTC+3 (TRT)

Cevheri is a neighbourhood of the town Sungurlu, Sungurlu District, Çorum Province, Turkey. Its population is 262 (2022).
