= Çiftlikköy, Sungurlu =

Village in Turkey

Çiftlikköy
- Neighbourhood
- Location in Turkey
- Coordinates: 40°9′9″N 34°16′55″E
- Country: Turkey
- Province: Çorum
- District: Sungurlu
- Municipality: Sungurlu
- Population (2022): 2,216
- Time zone: UTC+3 (TRT)

Çiftlikköy (also: Çiftlik) is a neighbourhood of the town Sungurlu, Sungurlu District, Çorum Province, Turkey. Its population is 2,216 (2022).
