= Streptomyces boncukensis =

Scientific classification
- Domain: Bacteria
- Kingdom: Bacillati
- Phylum: Actinomycetota
- Class: Actinomycetes
- Order: Streptomycetales
- Family: Streptomycetaceae
- Genus: Streptomyces
- Species: S. boncukensis

Binomial name
- Streptomyces boncukensis Tatar et al. 2021

Type strain
- SB3404

Species of bacterium

Streptomyces boncukensis is a Gram-positive, aerobic and non-motile bacterium species from the genus Streptomyces which has been isolated from soil from the Boncuk Saltern in Sungurlu-Çorum.

== See also ==
- List of Streptomyces species
