= Metin Balkanlıoğlu =

Turkish Islamic cleric (1958-2018)

Metin Balkanlıoğlu (1958–2018) was a Turkish Islamic cleric.

== Biography ==
Abdülmetin Balkanlıoğlu was born in 1958 in Aşağıfındıklı, Sungurlu. He graduated from Çorum İmam Hatip school in 1977, and from Istanbul University Faculty of Law in 1986. He began working as an imam in Şile in 1977. He was one of the leaders of the İsmailağa community. Balkanlıoğlu was married and had two children. He held nationalist views and supported Recep Tayyip Erdoğan.

He frequently made speeches against Gülenists, Kurdistan Workers' Party, Erbakanists, and the Turkish opposition.

He had a heart attack, and died on June 20, 2018 aged 60. His funeral was held at Fatih Mosque and he was buried in Edirnekapı.
