= Hacıosman =

Hacıosman can refer to:

- Hacıosman, Manyas
- Hacıosman, Sungurlu
- Hacıosman (Istanbul Metro)
