= Karacabey (disambiguation) =

Karacabey can refer to:

- Karacabey
- Karacabey, Sungurlu
- Karacabey horse
- Karacabey Belediyespor
