= Yeşilyurt, Sungurlu =

Village in Turkey

Yeşilyurt
- Village
- Location in Turkey
- Coordinates: 40°16′09″N 34°12′41″E
- Country: Turkey
- Province: Çorum
- District: Sungurlu
- Population (2022): 23
- Time zone: UTC+3 (TRT)

Yeşilyurt is a village in the Sungurlu District of Çorum Province in Turkey. Its population is 23 (2022).
