= Akçalı, Sungurlu =

Village in Turkey

Akçalı
- Village
- Location in Turkey
- Coordinates: 40.2113°N 34.4047°E
- Country: Turkey
- Province: Çorum
- District: Sungurlu
- Population (2022): 68
- Time zone: UTC+3 (TRT)

Akçalı is a village in the Sungurlu District of Çorum Province in Turkey. Its population is 68 (2022).
