= Kuşçalı, Sungurlu =

Village in Turkey

Kuşçalı
- Village
- Location in Turkey
- Coordinates: 40°16′N 34°00′E
- Country: Turkey
- Province: Çorum
- District: Sungurlu
- Population (2022): 220
- Time zone: UTC+3 (TRT)

Kuşçalı is a village in the Sungurlu District of Çorum Province in Turkey. Its population is 220 (2022).
