= Çiçekli, Sungurlu =

Village in Turkey

Çiçekli
- Village
- Location in Turkey
- Coordinates: 40.273611°N 34.3925°E
- Country: Turkey
- Province: Çorum
- District: Sungurlu
- Population (2022): 219
- Time zone: UTC+3 (TRT)

Çiçekli is a village in the Sungurlu District of Çorum Province in Turkey. Its population is 219 (2022).
