= Demirşeyh, Sungurlu =

Village in Turkey

Demirşeyh
- Village
- Country: Turkey
- Province: Çorum
- District: Sungurlu
- Population (2022): 714
- Time zone: UTC+3 (TRT)

Demirşeyh is a village in the Sungurlu District of Çorum Province in Turkey. Its population is 714 (2022). The village is populated by Turks. Before the 2013 reorganisation, it was a town (belde).
