= Çamoluk, Sungurlu =

Village in Turkey

Çamoluk
- Village
- Location in Turkey
- Coordinates: 39.975°N 34.273°E
- Country: Turkey
- Province: Çorum
- District: Sungurlu
- Population (2022): 76
- Time zone: UTC+3 (TRT)

Çamoluk is a village in the Sungurlu District of Çorum Province in Turkey. Its population is 76 (2022).
