= Karacabey, Sungurlu =

Village in Turkey

Karacabey
- Village
- Location of Çorum in Turkey
- Coordinates: 40°00′41″N 34°19′32″E
- Country: Turkey
- Region: Central Anatolia Region
- Province: Çorum
- District: Sungurlu
- Elevation: 1,532 m (5,026 ft)

Population (2021)
  - Total: 30
- Postal code: 19302
- Area code: 0364

Karacabey is a village in the Sungurlu District of Çorum Province in Turkey. Its population is 28 (2022).

== History ==
The name of the village appears as Karaoluk in the 1925 records.

== Geography ==
The village is 95 km away from Çorum District center and 25 km away from Sungurlu District center.

== Population ==
Village population data by years
| 2021 | 30 |
| 2020 | 31 |
| 2019 | 34 |
| 2018 | 38 |
| 2017 | 27 |
| 2016 | 23 |
| 2015 | 22 |
| 2014 | 18 |
| 2013 | 22 |
| 2012 | 25 |
| 2011 | 25 |
| 2010 | 20 |
| 2009 | 19 |
| 2008 | 24 |
| 2007 | 25 |
| 2000 | 83 |
