= Arabaçayı, Sungurlu =

Village in Turkey

Arabaçayı
- Village
- Location in Turkey
- Coordinates: 40°14′N 34°33′E
- Country: Turkey
- Province: Çorum
- District: Sungurlu
- Population (2022): 95
- Time zone: UTC+3 (TRT)

Arabaçayı is a village in the Sungurlu District of Çorum Province in Turkey. Its population is 95 (2022).
