= Sarıcalar, Sungurlu =

Village in Turkey

Sarıcalar
- Village
- Country: Turkey
- Province: Çorum
- District: Sungurlu
- Population (2022): 244
- Time zone: UTC+3 (TRT)

Sarıcalar is a village in the Sungurlu District of Çorum Province in Turkey. Its population is 244 (2022). The village is populated by Kurds.
