= Bağdatlı, Sungurlu =

Village in Turkey

Bağdatlı
- Village
- Location in Turkey
- Coordinates: 40.2666°N 34.0482°E
- Country: Turkey
- Province: Çorum
- District: Sungurlu
- Population (2022): 131
- Time zone: UTC+3 (TRT)

Bağdatlı is a village in the Sungurlu District of Çorum Province in Turkey. Its population is 131 (2022).
