= Çiçeklikeller, Sungurlu =

Village in Turkey

Çiçeklikeller
- Village
- Location in Turkey
- Coordinates: 40°00′N 34°17′E
- Country: Turkey
- Province: Çorum
- District: Sungurlu
- Population (2022): 115
- Time zone: UTC+3 (TRT)

Çiçeklikeller is a village in the Sungurlu District of Çorum Province in Turkey. Its population is 115 (2022).
