= Ayağıbüyük, Sungurlu =

Village in Turkey

Ayağıbüyük
- Village
- Location in Turkey
- Coordinates: 40°05′N 34°29′E
- Country: Turkey
- Province: Çorum
- District: Sungurlu
- Population (2022): 94
- Time zone: UTC+3 (TRT)

Ayağıbüyük is a village in the Sungurlu District of Çorum Province in Turkey. Its population is 94 (2022).
