= Mehmetaliçiftliği, Sungurlu =

Village in Turkey

Mehmetaliçiftliği
- Village
- Location in Turkey
- Coordinates: 40°26′N 34°16′E
- Country: Turkey
- Province: Çorum
- District: Sungurlu
- Population (2022): 34
- Time zone: UTC+3 (TRT)

Mehmetaliçiftliği is a village in the Sungurlu District of Çorum Province in Turkey. Its population is 34 (2022). The village is populated by Turks..
