= Aşağıbeşpınar, Sungurlu =

Village in Turkey

Aşağıbeşpınar
- Village
- Location in Turkey
- Coordinates: 40°09′N 34°14′E
- Country: Turkey
- Province: Çorum
- District: Sungurlu
- Population (2022): 26
- Time zone: UTC+3 (TRT)

Aşağıbeşpınar is a village in the Sungurlu District of Çorum Province in Turkey. Its population is 26 (2022).
