= Tuğcu, Sungurlu =

Village in Turkey

Tuğcu
- Village
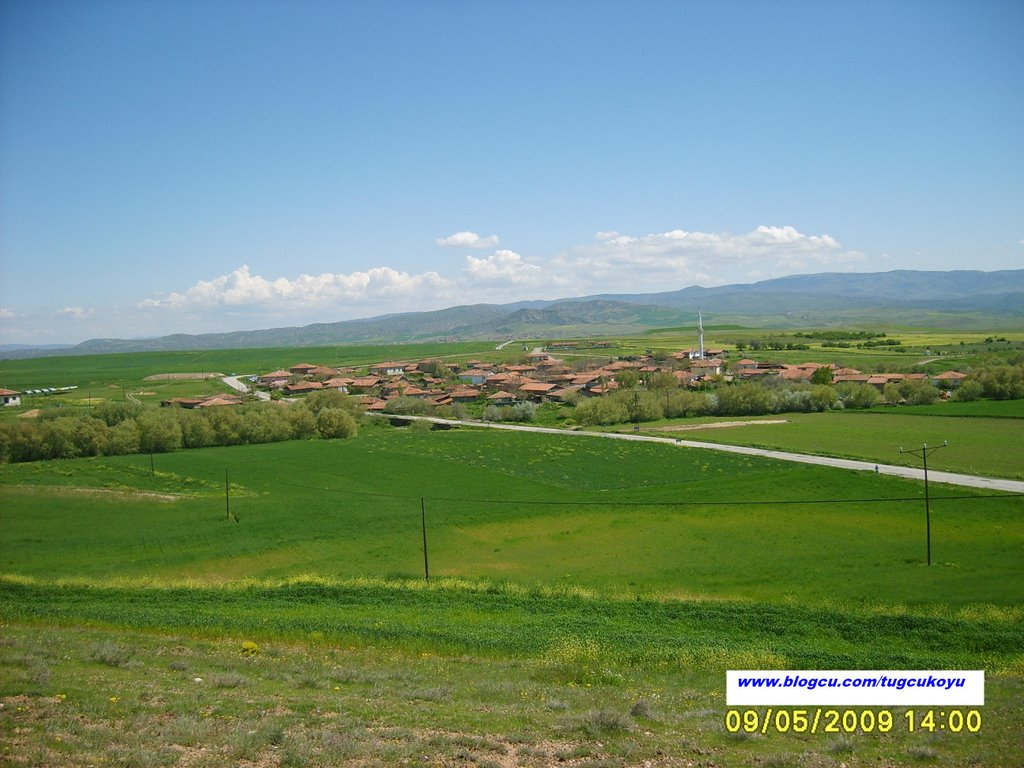

- Location within Turkey
- Coordinates: 40°11′N 34°19′E
- Country: Turkey
- Province: Çorum
- District: Sungurlu
- Population (2022): 101
- Time zone: UTC+3 (TRT)

Tuğcu is a village in the Sungurlu District of Çorum Province in Turkey. Its population is 101 (2022).
