= Oğlaközü, Sungurlu =

Village in Turkey

Oğlaközü
- Village
- Location in Turkey
- Coordinates: 40°14′N 34°27′E
- Country: Turkey
- Province: Çorum
- District: Sungurlu
- Population (2022): 93
- Time zone: UTC+3 (TRT)

Oğlaközü is a village in the Sungurlu District of Çorum Province in Turkey. Its population is 93 (2022).
