= Ekmekçi, Sungurlu =

Village in Turkey

Ekmekçi
- Village
- Country: Turkey
- Province: Çorum
- District: Sungurlu
- Population (2022): 236
- Time zone: UTC+3 (TRT)

Ekmekçi is a village in the Sungurlu District of Çorum Province in Turkey. Its population is 236 (2022).
