= Bunalan, Sungurlu =

Village in Turkey

Bunalan
- Village
- Location in Turkey
- Coordinates: 39°57′N 34°18′E
- Country: Turkey
- Province: Çorum
- District: Sungurlu
- Population (2022): 96
- Time zone: UTC+3 (TRT)

Bunalan is a village in the Sungurlu District of Çorum Province in Turkey. Its population is 96 (2022).
