= İnegazili, Sungurlu =

Village in Turkey

İnegazili
- Village
- Location in Turkey
- Coordinates: 40°13′N 34°01′E
- Country: Turkey
- Province: Çorum
- District: Sungurlu
- Population (2022): 306
- Time zone: UTC+3 (TRT)

İnegazili is a village in the Sungurlu District of Çorum Province in Turkey. Its population is 306 (2022).
