= Yirce, Sungurlu =

Village in Turkey

Yirce
- Village
- Country: Turkey
- Province: Çorum
- District: Sungurlu
- Population (2022): 91
- Time zone: UTC+3 (TRT)

Yirce is a village in the Sungurlu District of Çorum Province in Turkey. Its population is 91 (2022).
