= Tirkeş, Sungurlu =

Village in Turkey

Tirkeş
- Village
- Country: Turkey
- Province: Çorum
- District: Sungurlu
- Population (2022): 42
- Time zone: UTC+3 (TRT)

Tirkeş (formerly: Tatlısu) is a village in the Sungurlu District of Çorum Province in Turkey. Its population is 42 (2022). It's located northwest of Sungurlu.
