= Dertli, Sungurlu =

Village in Turkey

Dertli
- Village
- Location in Turkey
- Coordinates: 40°17′N 34°17′E
- Country: Turkey
- Province: Çorum
- District: Sungurlu
- Population (2022): 38
- Time zone: UTC+3 (TRT)

Dertli is a village in the Sungurlu District of Çorum Province in Turkey. Its population is 38 (2022).
