= Arifegazili, Sungurlu =

Village in Turkey

Arifegazili
- Village
- Location in Turkey
- Coordinates: 40°13′N 34°32′E
- Country: Turkey
- Province: Çorum
- District: Sungurlu
- Population (2022): 1,134
- Time zone: UTC+3 (TRT)

Arifegazili is a village in the Sungurlu District of Çorum Province in Turkey. Its population is 1,134 (2022). Before the 2013 reorganisation, it was a town (belde).
