= Yeşilova, Sungurlu =

Village in Turkey

Yeşilova
- Village
- Country: Turkey
- Province: Çorum
- District: Sungurlu
- Population (2022): 73
- Time zone: UTC+3 (TRT)

Yeşilova is a village in the Sungurlu District of Çorum Province in Turkey. Its population is 73 (2022). The village is populated by Kurds.
