= Akdere, Sungurlu =

Village in Turkey

Akdere
- Village
- Location in Turkey
- Coordinates: 40.2388°N 34.4939°E
- Country: Turkey
- Province: Çorum
- District: Sungurlu
- Population (2022): 137
- Time zone: UTC+3 (TRT)

Akdere is a village in the Sungurlu District of Çorum Province in Turkey. Its population is 137 (2022).
