= Şekerhacılı, Sungurlu =

Village in Turkey

Şekerhacılı
- Village
- Location in Turkey
- Coordinates: 40°09′N 34°36′E
- Country: Turkey
- Province: Çorum
- District: Sungurlu
- Population (2022): 100
- Time zone: UTC+3 (TRT)

Şekerhacılı is a village in the Sungurlu District of Çorum Province in Turkey. Its population is 100 (2022).
