= Bahşılı, Sungurlu =

Village in Turkey

Bahşılı
- Village
- Location in Turkey
- Coordinates: 40.1018°N 34.1164°E
- Country: Turkey
- Province: Çorum
- District: Sungurlu
- Population (2022): 176
- Time zone: UTC+3 (TRT)

Bahşılı is a village in the Sungurlu District of Çorum Province in Turkey. Its population is 176 (2022).
