= Beşkız, Sungurlu =

Village in Turkey

Beşkız
- Village
- Location in Turkey
- Coordinates: 40°05′N 34°26′E
- Country: Turkey
- Province: Çorum
- District: Sungurlu
- Population (2022): 439
- Time zone: UTC+3 (TRT)

Beşkız is a village in the Sungurlu District of Çorum Province in Turkey. Its population is 439 (2022). The village is populated by Kurds.
