= Büyükpolatlı, Sungurlu =

Village in Turkey

Büyükpolatlı
- Village
- Location in Turkey
- Coordinates: 40.0387°N 34.2752°E
- Country: Turkey
- Province: Çorum
- District: Sungurlu
- Population (2022): 138
- Time zone: UTC+3 (TRT)

Büyükpolatlı (also: Büyükbolat) is a village in the Sungurlu District of Çorum Province in Turkey. Its population is 138 (2022).
