= Balkaya, Sungurlu =

Village in Turkey

Balkaya
- Village
- Location in Turkey
- Coordinates: 39.9688°N 34.3325°E
- Country: Turkey
- Province: Çorum
- District: Sungurlu
- Population (2022): 193
- Time zone: UTC+3 (TRT)

Balkaya is a village in the Sungurlu District of Çorum Province in Turkey. Its population is 193 (2022).
