= Güvendik, Sungurlu =

Village in Turkey

Güvendik
- Village
- Country: Turkey
- Province: Çorum
- District: Sungurlu
- Population (2022): 124
- Time zone: UTC+3 (TRT)

Güvendik is a village in the Sungurlu District of Çorum Province in Turkey. Its population is 124 (2022).
