= SoL (newspaper) =

soL
- Type: Daily newspaper
- Format: Berliner
- Owner(s): Erkan Yıldız
- Editor-in-chief: Kemal Okuyan
- Founded: 1 October 2012
- Political alignment: Left
- Language: Turkish
- Circulation: 14.378
- Website: sol.org.tr

soL ("Left" in Turkish) is a left-leaning newspaper in Turkey.

== Supplements ==
The newspaper publishes the following sections throughout the week:

- soL Güncel (Sol Daily),
- soL Kitap (Sol Literature),
- soL Kültür (Sol Culture),
- BilimsoL (Science Sol),
- Tercüme Odası (Interpretation Room),
- soL Bakış (Sol Viewpoint)

On Sunday, the publication has additional supplements.

== Columnists ==
The columnists of the newspaper are:

- Ahmet Abakay
- Asaf Güven Aksel
- Aslı Kayabal
- Aydemir Güler
- Emrah Kartal
- Erbil Tuşalp
- Fırat Tanış
- İlhan Cihaner
- İzzettin Önder
- Kemal Okuyan
- Kerem Esenoğlu
- Korkut Boratav
- Mehmet Bozkurt
- Mete Gönenç
- Metin Çulhaoğlu
- Oğuz Oyan
- Ömer Faruk Eminağaoğlu
- Pınar Aydınlar
- Renan Bilek
- Rıfat Okçabol
- Şükran Yiğit
- Yavuz Alogan
