= Karakocalı, Sungurlu =

Village in Turkey

Karakocalı
- Village
- Location in Turkey
- Coordinates: 40°18′N 34°27′E
- Country: Turkey
- Province: Çorum
- District: Sungurlu
- Population (2022): 175
- Time zone: UTC+3 (TRT)

Karakocalı is a village in the Sungurlu District of Çorum Province in Turkey. Its population is 175 (2022).

histo
