= Arıcı, Sungurlu =

Village in Turkey

Arıcı
- Village
- Location in Turkey
- Coordinates: 40°15′N 34°22′E
- Country: Turkey
- Province: Çorum
- District: Sungurlu
- Population (2022): 174
- Time zone: UTC+3 (TRT)

Arıcı is a village in the Sungurlu District of Çorum Province in Turkey. Its population is 174 (2022).
