= Gökçeköy, Sungurlu =

Village in Turkey

Gökçeköy
- Village
- Location in Turkey
- Coordinates: 40°12′0″N 34°36′51″E
- Country: Turkey
- Province: Çorum
- District: Sungurlu
- Population (2022): 61
- Time zone: UTC+3 (TRT)

Gökçeköy is a village in the Sungurlu District of Çorum Province in Turkey. Its population is 61 (2022).
