= Beyyurdu, Sungurlu =

Village in Turkey

Beyyurdu
- Village
- Location in Turkey
- Coordinates: 40.1818°N 34.5801°E
- Country: Turkey
- Province: Çorum
- District: Sungurlu
- Population (2022): 99
- Time zone: UTC+3 (TRT)

Beyyurdu is a village in the Sungurlu District of Çorum Province in Turkey. Its population is 99 (2022).
