= Akpınar, Sungurlu =

Village in Turkey

Akpınar
- Village
- Location in Turkey
- Coordinates: 40.1216°N 34.1928°E
- Country: Turkey
- Province: Çorum
- District: Sungurlu
- Population (2022): 108
- Time zone: UTC+3 (TRT)

Akpınar is a village in the Sungurlu District of Çorum Province in Turkey. Its population is 108 (2022).
