= Bağcılı, Sungurlu =

Village in Turkey

Bağcılı
- Village
- Location in Turkey
- Coordinates: 40.0626°N 34.2551°E
- Country: Turkey
- Province: Çorum
- District: Sungurlu
- Population (2022): 79
- Time zone: UTC+3 (TRT)

Bağcılı is a village in the Sungurlu District of Çorum Province in Turkey. Its population is 79 (2022).
