= Gafurlu, Sungurlu =

Village in Turkey

Gafurlu
- Village
- Location in Turkey
- Coordinates: 40°15′N 34°35′E
- Country: Turkey
- Province: Çorum
- District: Sungurlu
- Population (2022): 25
- Time zone: UTC+3 (TRT)

Gafurlu is a village in the Sungurlu District of Çorum Province in Turkey. Its population is 25 (2022).
