= Çulhalı, Sungurlu =

Village in Turkey

Çulhalı
- Village
- Location in Turkey
- Coordinates: 40.298°N 34.314°E
- Country: Turkey
- Province: Çorum
- District: Sungurlu
- Population (2022): 87
- Time zone: UTC+3 (TRT)

Çulhalı is a village in the Sungurlu District of Çorum Province in Turkey. Its population is 87 (2022).
