= Türkhacılarhanı, Sungurlu =

Village in Turkey

Türkhacılarhanı
- Village
- Country: Turkey
- Province: Çorum
- District: Sungurlu
- Population (2022): 221
- Time zone: UTC+3 (TRT)

Türkhacılarhanı is a village in the Sungurlu District of Çorum Province in Turkey. Its population is 221 (2022).
