= Tuğlu, Sungurlu =

Village in Turkey

Tuğlu
- Village
- Country: Turkey
- Province: Çorum
- District: Sungurlu
- Population (2022): 251
- Time zone: UTC+3 (TRT)

Tuğlu is a village in the Sungurlu District of Çorum Province in Turkey. Its population is 251 (2022). Before the 2013 reorganisation, it was a town (belde).
