= Çayan, Sungurlu =

Village in Turkey

Çayan
- Village
- Location in Turkey
- Coordinates: 40.3691°N 34.2694°E
- Country: Turkey
- Province: Çorum
- District: Sungurlu
- Population (2022): 151
- Time zone: UTC+3 (TRT)

Çayan is a village in the Sungurlu District of Çorum Province in Turkey. Its population is 151 (2022).
