= Üçoluk, Sungurlu =

Village in Turkey

Üçoluk
- Village
- Location in Turkey
- Coordinates: 40.3842°N 34.3586°E
- Country: Turkey
- Province: Çorum
- District: Sungurlu
- Population (2022): 37
- Time zone: UTC+3 (TRT)

Üçoluk is a village in the Sungurlu District of Çorum Province in Turkey. Its population is 37 (2022).
