= Küçükpolatlı, Sungurlu =

Village in Turkey

Küçükpolatlı
- Village
- Location in Turkey
- Coordinates: 40°7′18″N 34°22′53″E
- Country: Turkey
- Province: Çorum
- District: Sungurlu
- Population (2022): 174
- Time zone: UTC+3 (TRT)

Küçükpolatlı (also: Küçükbolat) is a village in the Sungurlu District of Çorum Province in Turkey. Its population is 174 (2022).
