= Aydoğan, Sungurlu =

Village in Turkey

Aydoğan
- Village
- Location in Turkey
- Coordinates: 40.1426°N 34.1944°E
- Country: Turkey
- Province: Çorum
- District: Sungurlu
- Population (2022): 36
- Time zone: UTC+3 (TRT)

Aydoğan is a village in the Sungurlu District of Çorum Province in Turkey. Its population is 36 (2022).
