= Gökçam, Sungurlu =

Village in Turkey

Gökçam
- Village
- Location in Turkey
- Coordinates: 40°8′13″N 34°34′28″E
- Country: Turkey
- Province: Çorum
- District: Sungurlu
- Population (2022): 128
- Time zone: UTC+3 (TRT)

Gökçam is a village in the Sungurlu District of Çorum Province in Turkey. Its population is 128 (2022).
