= Kavşut, Sungurlu =

Village in Turkey

Kavşut
- Village
- Location in Turkey
- Coordinates: 40°16′33″N 34°8′13″E
- Country: Turkey
- Province: Çorum
- District: Sungurlu
- Population (2022): 289
- Time zone: UTC+3 (TRT)

Kavşut is a village in the Sungurlu District of Çorum Province in Turkey. Its population is 289 (2022). Before the 2013 reorganisation, it was a town (belde).
