= Akçakoyunlu, Sungurlu =

Village in Turkey

Akçakoyunlu
- Village
- Location in Turkey
- Coordinates: 40.0314°N 34.1812°E
- Country: Turkey
- Province: Çorum
- District: Sungurlu
- Population (2022): 38
- Time zone: UTC+3 (TRT)

Akçakoyunlu is a village in the Sungurlu District of Çorum Province in Turkey. Its population is 38 (2022).
