= İsmailağa =

Sufi order in Turkey

İsmailağa Jamaah or İsmail Ağa Jamaah (Turkish: İsmailağa Cemaati; Ottoman Turkish: اسماعیل آغا جماعتی) is a branch of the Gümüşhanevî Dergâh of Nakşibendi-Khālidī Ṭarīqah (Sufi Order) in Turkey.

It takes its name from the İsmailağa Mosque in Fatih, Istanbul. It is aligned with the Naqshbandi spiritual order of Sunni Islam Sufism in the silsilah of Khalidiyya and was led by Mahmut Ustaosmanoğlu, imam of the İsmailağa Mosque from 1954 to 1996. It has significant influence over daily life in few streets of Fatih, the capital district of Istanbul. In 2006, Deniz Baykal described the whole district of Fatih as an "İsmailağa republic". There are communities in a number of other cities in Turkey, including Erzincan.

== Characteristics ==
According to Ahmet Hakan Coşkun, the jamia requires strict Islamic-clothing, with members wearing beards, Kaftans, and shalwar trousers, and turbans of white muslin when praying. Women wear a face-covering Çarşaf (chador). A number of leading Turkish politicians are associated with the wider Naqshbandi order; President Recep Tayyip Erdoğan is said to have links with the stricter İsmailağa branch. This might explain how the wire-tapping ordered by public prosecutor İlhan Cihaner in 2007 to 2009 in relation to İsmailağa included Erdoğan.

== History ==
In the 1990s the group sent missionaries to parts of the Caucasus (particularly Azerbaijan), and trained people at its madrassa in the İsmailağa Mosque. The work continued more slowly after new restrictions on religious activities in Turkey 1997.

The İsmailağa Jamia came to wider public attention in Turkey through three murders committed in the İsmailağa Mosque - the son-in-law of Mahmut Ustaosmanoğlu in 1998 and in 2006 a retired imam and the man who stabbed him, who was lynched. From 2007 to 2009 the local Chief Public Prosecutor in Erzincan, İlhan Cihaner, investigated the community and ordered wire-tapping after reports of the community offering unauthorised Koran courses and preventing girls from attending school.

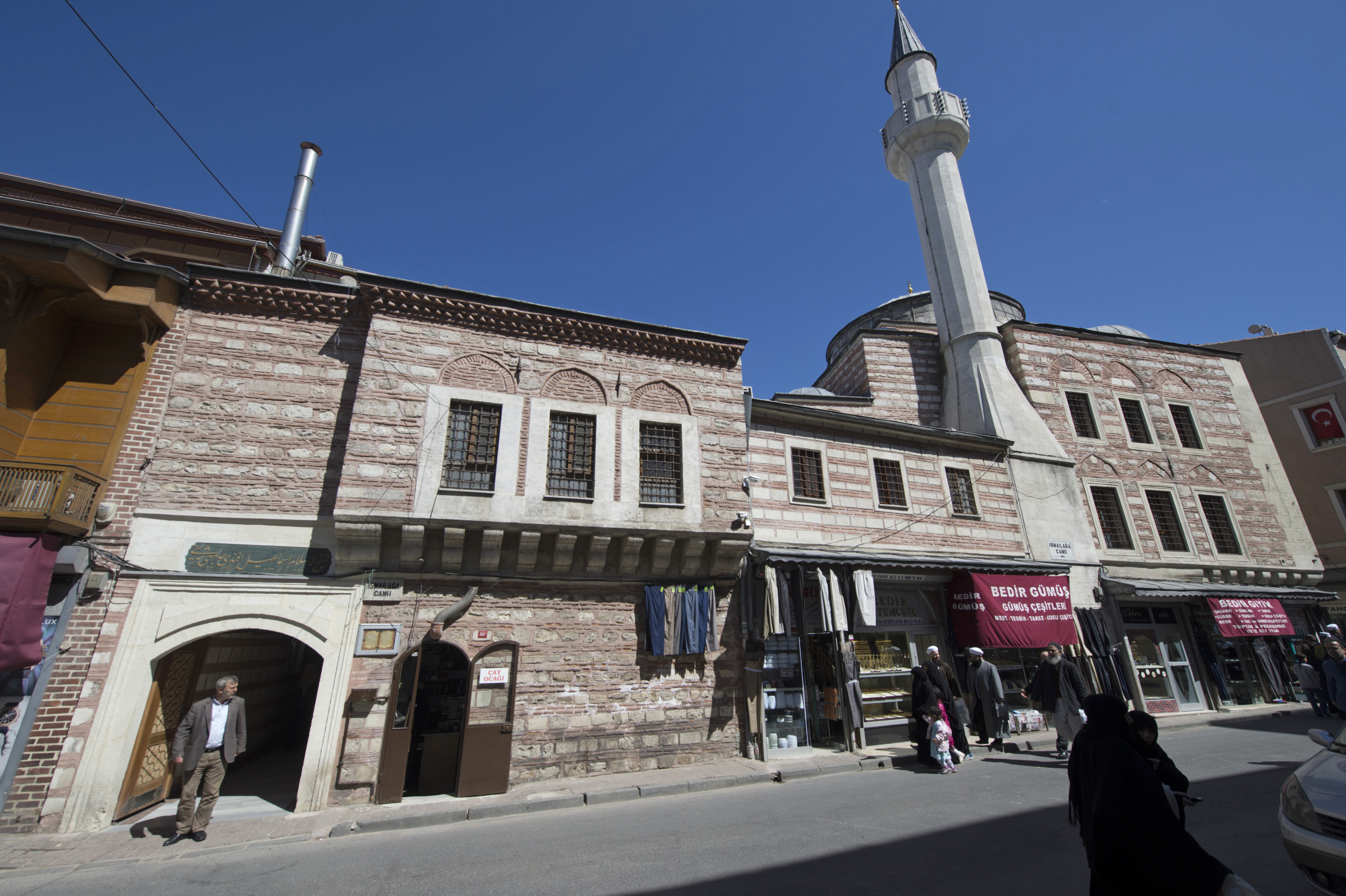
İsmailağa Mosque from Manyasizade Caddesi

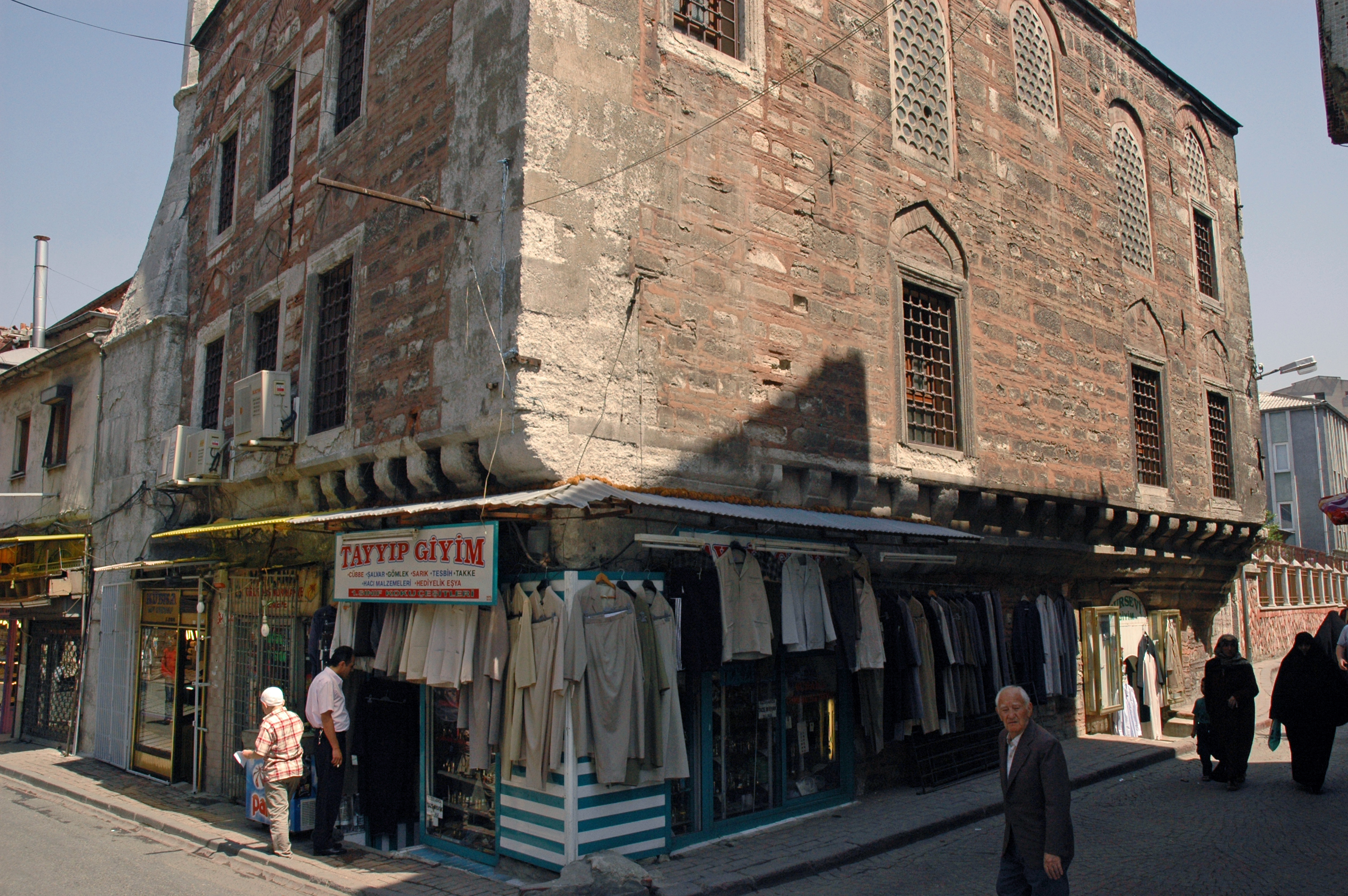
İsmailağa Mosque corner İsmailağa Sokak

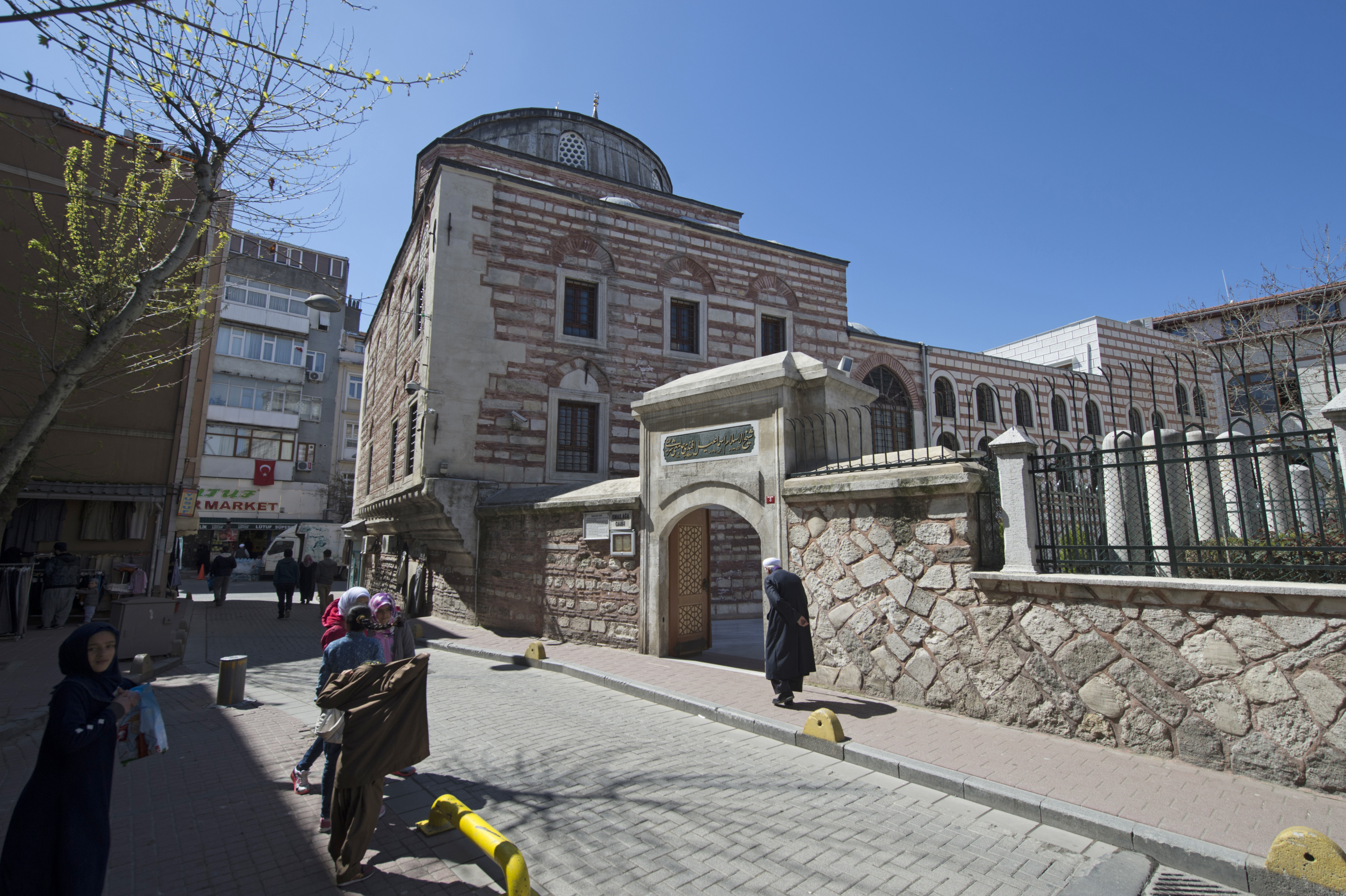
İsmailağa Mosque from İsmailağa Sokak

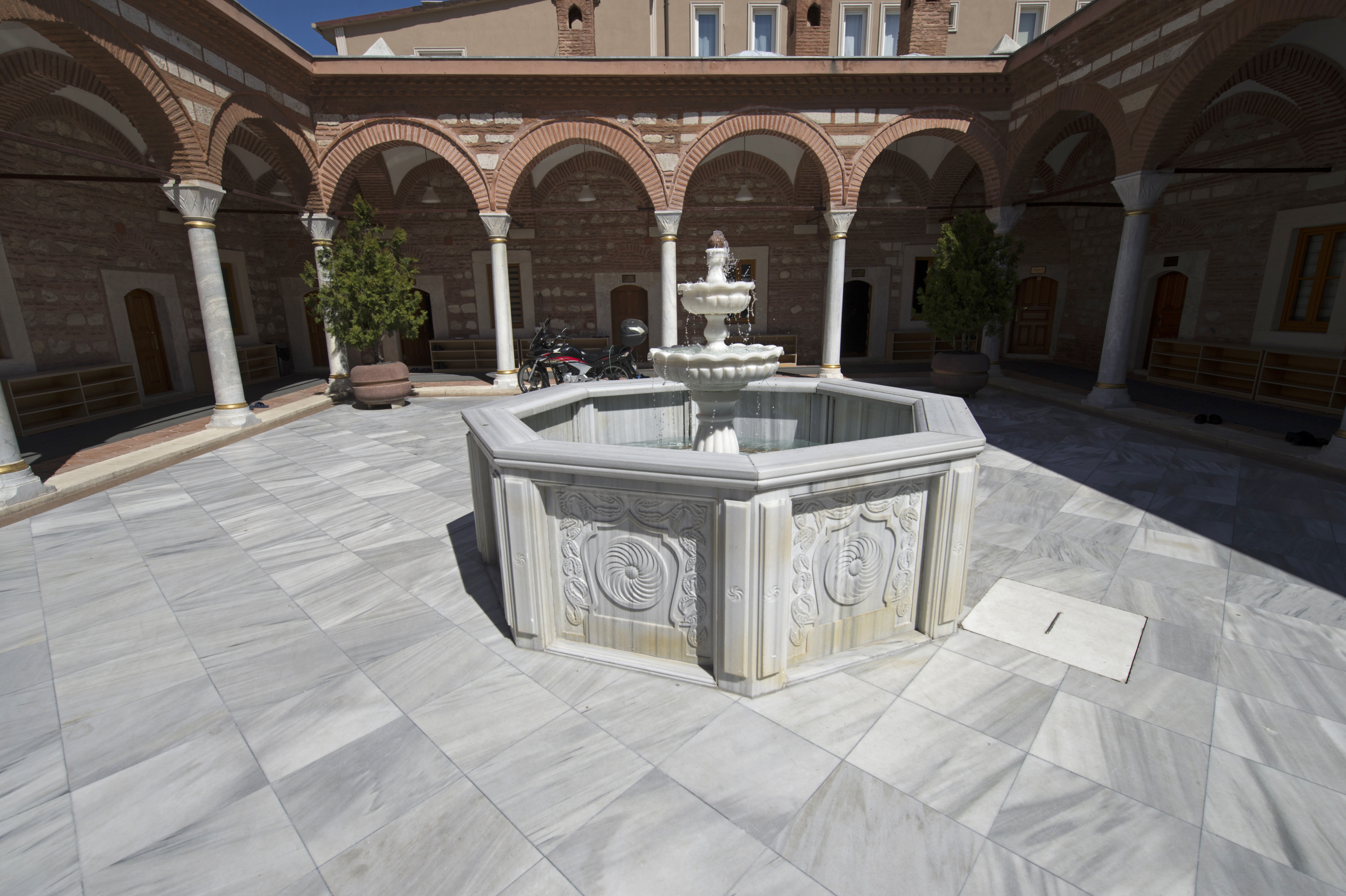
İsmailağa Mosque courtyard

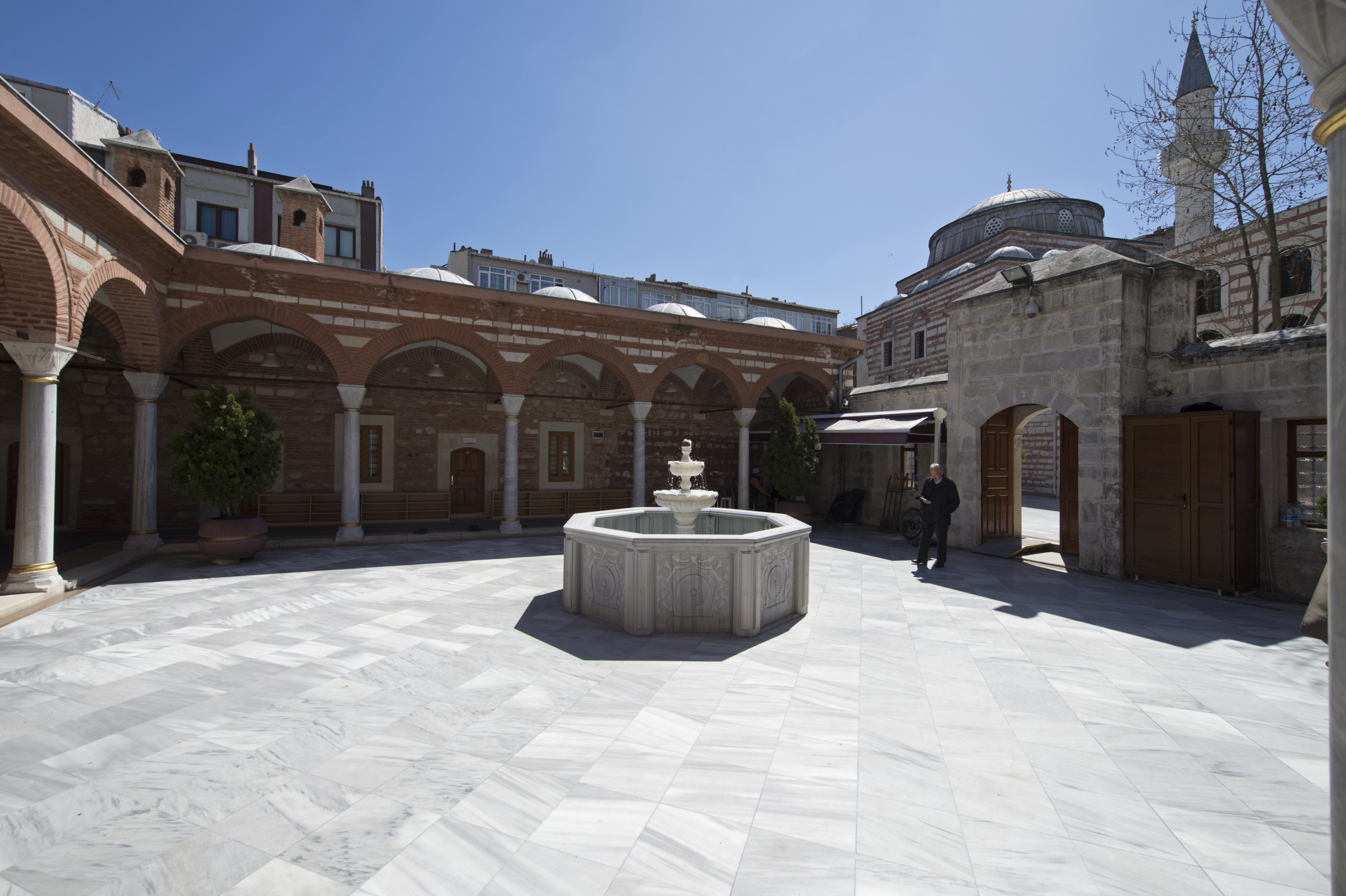
İsmailağa Mosque courtyard

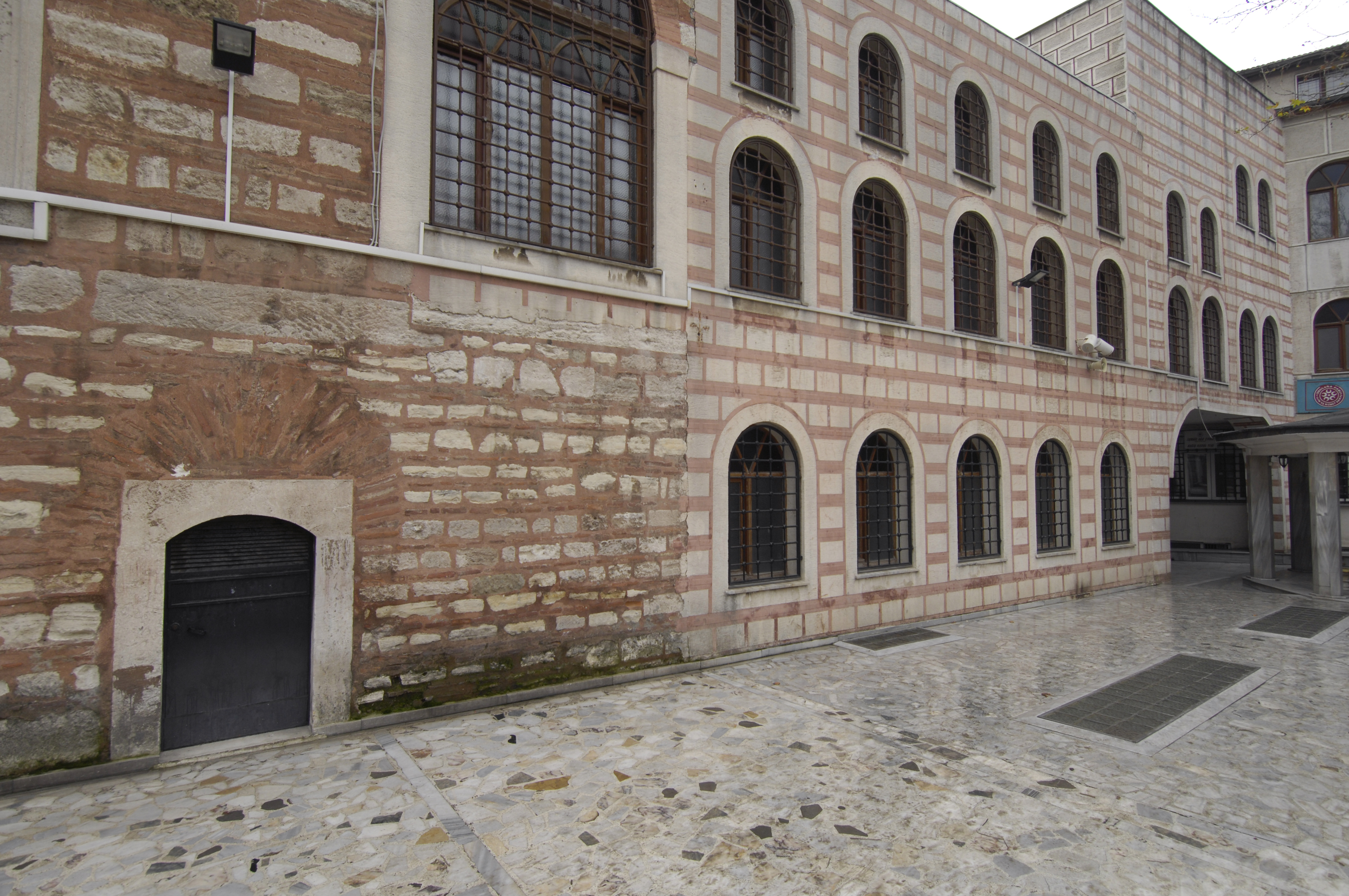
İsmailağa Mosque from courtyard
