= Beşdam, Sungurlu =

Village in Turkey

Beşdam
- Village
- Location in Turkey
- Coordinates: 40.2417°N 34.6145°E
- Country: Turkey
- Province: Çorum
- District: Sungurlu
- Population (2022): 71
- Time zone: UTC+3 (TRT)

Beşdam is a village in the Sungurlu District of Çorum Province in Turkey. Its population is 71 (2022). The village is populated by Kurds.
