= Yukarıbeşpınar, Sungurlu =

Village in Turkey

Yukarıbeşpınar
- Village
- Location in Turkey
- Coordinates: 40°11′N 34°15′E
- Country: Turkey
- Province: Çorum
- District: Sungurlu
- Population (2022): 41
- Time zone: UTC+3 (TRT)

Yukarıbeşpınar is a village in the Sungurlu District of Çorum Province in Turkey. Its population is 41 (2022).
