= Boztepe, Sungurlu =

Village in Turkey

Boztepe
- Village
- Location in Turkey
- Coordinates: 40.2159°N 34.2928°E
- Country: Turkey
- Province: Çorum
- District: Sungurlu
- Population (2022): 51
- Time zone: UTC+3 (TRT)

Boztepe is a village in the Sungurlu District of Çorum Province in Turkey. Its population is 51 (2022).
