= İlhan Cihaner =

Turkish politician

İlhan Cihaner MP
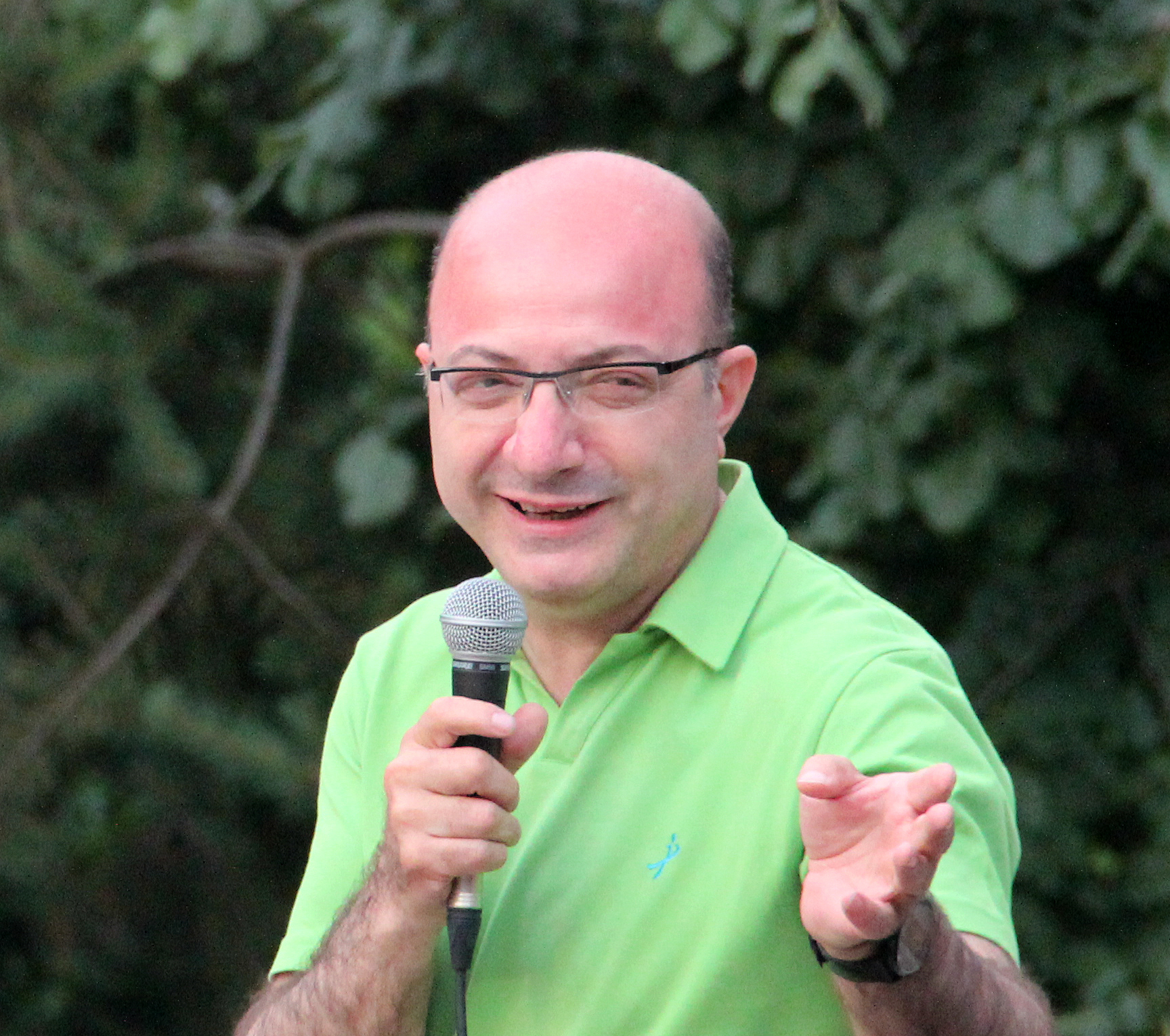

Member of the Grand National Assembly
- Incumbent
- Assumed office 12 June 2011
- Constituency: Denizli (2011, June 2015)

Personal details
- Born: February 23, 1968 (age 58) Kağızman, Kars, Turkey
- Party: Republican People's Party (CHP)
- Education: Gazi University
- Occupation: Politician
- Profession: Prosecutor

İlhan Cihaner (born 23 February 1968, Kağızman), is a Turkish leftist politician and a former prosecutor. He's a parliamentary deputy for the Republican People's Party (CHP) since 2011. He was the Chief Public Prosecutor of Erzincan from 2007; he resigned in 2011 in order to stand for election. He is a suspect in the Ergenekon trials. He is a columnist for the soL newspaper.

== Career ==
Cihaner, then a prosecutor in İdil (Şırnak Province), was the first prosecutor to point at the Turkish Gendarmerie's JİTEM, in an indictment of 1997. He held the defendants including civil servants, confessors and others responsible for killings, bombings and "disappearances". Defendant No. 1 was Ahmet Cem Ersever and defendant No. 2 was Arif Doğan.

He was appointed Chief Public Prosecutor of Erzincan in 2007. In this position he ordered an investigation of the İsmailağa and Gülen religious communities. Some months later, Taraf published a plan entitled "Action Plan against Religious Radicalism", an alleged plan to discredit religious communities and the AKP government by planting weapons. A Justice Ministry investigation followed, and the İsmailağa case was transferred to another prosecutor, Osman Şanal, on the grounds that there were allegations that İsmailağa was a terrorist group. Osman Sanal wire tapped the Chief Public Prosecutor, Ilhan Cihaner The same year, (November 2010) Osman Sanal litigated newspaper reporter İlhan Taşçı about his book on İsmailağa religious society. Osman Sanal was arrested and charged as a member of the Fethullah Terrorist Organization (FETÖ) after the attempted coup in 2016.

== Charges ==
Cihaner was arrested in February 2010 as part of the Ergenekon trials investigation, and charged with membership of “Ergenekon” organization. Court ordered release of Ilhan Cihaner during his trial in August 2010. He was appointed a public prosecutor in Adana in November 2010.

Cihaner was found not guilty in conspiracy cases which were conducted by the members of Gulenist's prosecutors who were fled from Turkey.

== Political views ==
Cihaner is self-described as a leftist and social democrat, while he and his caucus within the party, Us for Future (Gelecek için Biz), stand for more radical left-wing values that includes democratic and socialist sentiments. He opposes imperialism, militarism, interventionism, and supports left-populist values such as race and gender equality, withdrawal of troops from foreign countries and LGBT rights.
