= Çukurlu, Sungurlu =

Village in Turkey

Çukurlu
- Village
- Location in Turkey
- Coordinates: 40.066°N 34.358°E
- Country: Turkey
- Province: Çorum
- District: Sungurlu
- Population (2022): 54
- Time zone: UTC+3 (TRT)

Çukurlu is a village in the Sungurlu District of Çorum Province in Turkey. Its population is 54 (2022).
