= Yorgalı, Sungurlu =

Village in Turkey

Yorgalı
- Village
- Location in Turkey
- Coordinates: 40°06′N 34°16′E
- Country: Turkey
- Province: Çorum
- District: Sungurlu
- Population (2022): 30
- Time zone: UTC+3 (TRT)

Yorgalı is a village in the Sungurlu District of Çorum Province in Turkey. Its population is 30 (2022).
