= Kaledere, Sungurlu =

Village in Turkey

Kaledere
- Village
- Location in Turkey
- Coordinates: 40.338333°N 34.426389°E
- Country: Turkey
- Province: Çorum
- District: Sungurlu
- Population (2022): 483
- Time zone: UTC+3 (TRT)

Kaledere is a village in the Sungurlu District of Çorum Province in Turkey. Its population is 483 (2022). Before the 2013 reorganisation, it was a town (belde).
