= Kurbağlı, Sungurlu =

Village in Turkey

Kurbağlı
- Village
- Location in Turkey
- Coordinates: 40°02′N 34°24′E
- Country: Turkey
- Province: Çorum
- District: Sungurlu
- Population (2022): 101
- Time zone: UTC+3 (TRT)

Kurbağlı is a village in the Sungurlu District of Çorum Province in Turkey. Its population is 101 (2022).
