= Alembeyli, Sungurlu =

Village in Turkey

Alembeyli
- Village
- Location in Turkey
- Coordinates: 40°03′N 34°13′E
- Country: Turkey
- Province: Çorum
- District: Sungurlu
- Population (2022): 179
- Time zone: UTC+3 (TRT)

Alembeyli is a village in the Sungurlu District of Çorum Province in Turkey. Its population is 179 (2022).
