= Tatlı, Samukh =

Tatlı
- Municipality
- Location within Azerbaijan
- Coordinates: 40°43′N 46°26′E
- Country: Azerbaijan
- Rayon: Samukh

Population
  - Total: 926
- Time zone: UTC+4 (AZT)
  - Summer (DST): UTC+5 (AZT)

Tatlı (also, Tatly) is a village and municipality in the Samukh Rayon of Azerbaijan. It has a population of 926.
