= Asayiş, Sungurlu =

Village in Turkey

Asayiş
- Village
- Location in Turkey
- Coordinates: 40.3967°N 34.2184°E
- Country: Turkey
- Province: Çorum
- District: Sungurlu
- Population (2022): 12
- Time zone: UTC+3 (TRT)

Asayiş is a village in the Sungurlu District of Çorum Province in Turkey. Its population is 12 (2022). The village is populated by Kurds.
