= Beylice, Sungurlu =

Village in Turkey

Beylice
- Village
- Location within Turkey
- Coordinates: 40.2170°N 34.6115°E
- Country: Turkey
- Province: Çorum
- District: Sungurlu
- Population (2022): 143
- Time zone: UTC+3 (TRT)

Beylice is a village in the Sungurlu District of Çorum Province in Turkey. As of 2022, it has a population is 143.
