= Asayesh, Iran =

Asayesh اسايش
- Village
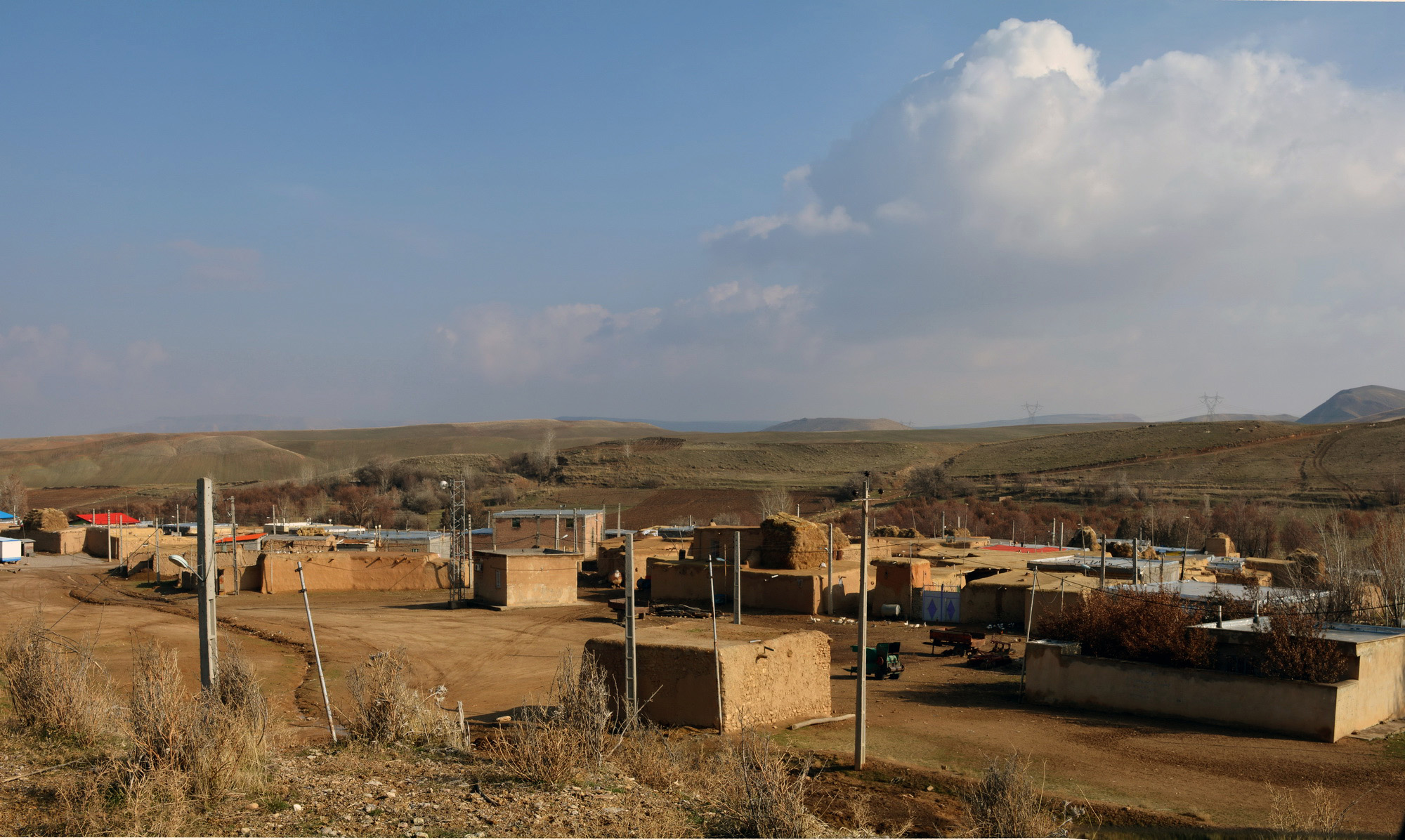

- Location within Iran
- Coordinates: 37°18′08″N 46°48′45″E
- Country: Iran
- Province: East Azerbaijan
- County: Hashtrud
- Bakhsh: Nazarkahrizi
- Rural District: Nazarkahrizi

Population (2006)
  - Total: 152
- Time zone: UTC+3:30 (IRST)
  - Summer (DST): UTC+4:30 (IRDT)

Asayesh (Persian: اسايش, also Romanized as Āsāyesh) is a village in Nazarkahrizi Rural District, Nazarkahrizi District, Hashtrud County, East Azerbaijan province, Iran. At the 2006 census, its population was 152, in 32 families.
