= Beylice, Tarsus =

Beylice
- Neighbourhood
- Location in Turkey
- Coordinates: 37°05′N 34°46′E
- Country: Turkey
- Province: Mersin
- District: Tarsus
- Elevation: 575 m (1,886 ft)
- Population (2022): 732
- Time zone: UTC+3 (TRT)
- Area code: 0324

Beylice (formerly Manaz) is a neighbourhood in the municipality and district of Tarsus, Mersin Province, Turkey. Its population is 732 (2022). It is situated on the southern slopes of the Taurus Mountains. Its distance to Tarsus is 30 kilometres (19 mi) and its distance to Mersin is 57 kilometres (35 mi). The village was founded by Yörüks (once nomadic Turkmens) and the former name of the village is thought to refer to a Yörük leader named Manas.
