= Hacıosman, Sungurlu =

Village in Turkey

Hacıosman
- Village
- Location in Turkey
- Coordinates: 40.33116°N 34.31508°E
- Country: Turkey
- Province: Çorum
- District: Sungurlu
- Population (2022): 317
- Time zone: UTC+3 (TRT)

Hacıosman is a village in the Sungurlu District of Çorum Province in Turkey. Its population is 317 (2022). The village is populated by Kurds.
