= Aşağıfındıklı, Sungurlu =

Village in Turkey

Aşağıfındıklı
- Village
- Location in Turkey
- Coordinates: 40°16′N 34°25′E
- Country: Turkey
- Province: Çorum
- District: Sungurlu
- Population (2022): 867
- Time zone: UTC+3 (TRT)

Aşağıfındıklı is a village in the Sungurlu District of Çorum Province in Turkey. Its population is 867 (2022).
