= Sungurlu District =

District of Çorum Province, Turkey

- District
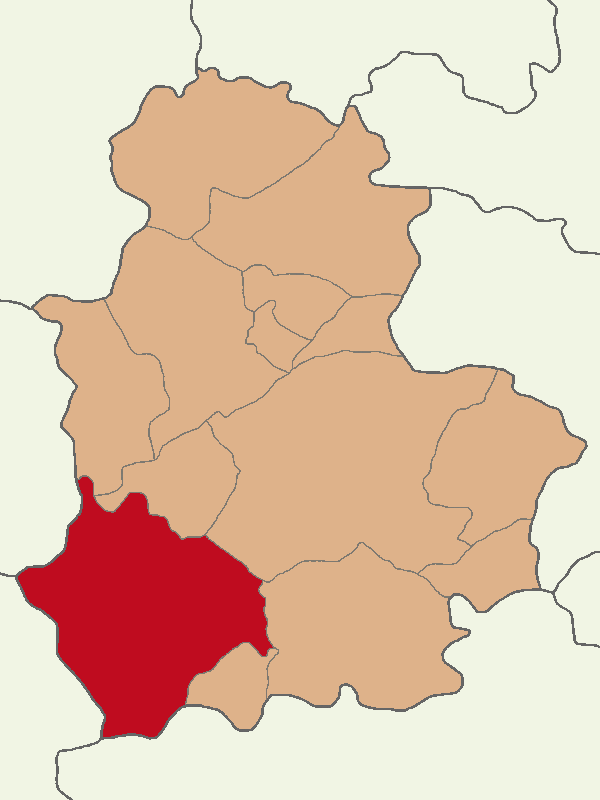
- Map showing Sungurlu District in Çorum Province

- Location in Turkey
- Coordinates: 40°10′N 34°23′E
- Country: Turkey
- Province: Çorum
- Seat: Sungurlu

Government
  - Kaymakam: Fatih Görmüş
- Area: 1,999 km^{2} (772 sq mi)
- Population (2022): 48,296
  - Density: 24/km^{2} (63/sq mi)
- Time zone: UTC+3 (TRT)
- Website: www.sungurlu.gov.tr

Sungurlu District is a district of the Çorum Province of Turkey. Its seat is the town of Sungurlu. Its area is 1,999 km^{2}, and its population is 48,296 (2022).

== Composition ==
There is one municipality in Sungurlu District:

- Sungurlu

There are 108 villages in Sungurlu District:

- Akçakoyunlu
- Akçalı
- Akdere
- Akpınar
- Alembeyli
- Arabaçayı
- Arıcı
- Arifegazili
- Aşağıbeşpınar
- Aşağıfındıklı
- Asayiş
- Ayağıbüyük
- Aydoğan
- Bağcılı
- Bağdatlı
- Bahşılı
- Balkaya
- Beşdam
- Beşkız
- Beylice
- Beyyurdu
- Boztepe
- Bozyayla
- Bunalan
- Büyükpolatlı
- Büyükincesu
- Çadırhüyük
- Çamoluk
- Çavuşçu
- Çavuşköy
- Çayan
- Çayyaka
- Çiçekli
- Çiçeklikeller
- Çingiller
- Çukurlu
- Çulhalı
- Dayıncık
- Demirşeyh
- Denizli
- Derekışla
- Dertli
- Ekmekçi
- Eşme
- Gafurlu
- Gökçam
- Gökçeköy
- Göller
- Gülderesi
- Güloluk
- Güvendik
- Hacıosman
- Hilalli
- İkizli
- İmirli
- İnegazili
- Kaledere
- Kalenderoğlu
- Kamışlı
- Karacabey
- Karaçay
- Karakaya
- Karakocalı
- Karaoğlu
- Kavşut
- Kemalli
- Kertme
- Kırankışla
- Kışlaköy
- Kızılcakışla
- Körkü
- Küçükpolatlı
- Küçükincesu
- Kula
- Kurbağlı
- Kuşçalı
- Kuzucak
- Mahmatlı
- Mehmetaliçiftliği
- Mehmetbeyli
- Muratkolu
- Oğlaközü
- Ortakışla
- Ortaköy
- Oyaca
- Salmanköy
- Saraycık
- Sarıcalar
- Sarıkaya
- Şekerhacılı
- Tatlı
- Terzili
- Tirkeş
- Tokullu
- Topuz
- Tuğcu
- Tuğlu
- Turgutlu
- Türkhacılarhanı
- Üçoluk
- Yarımsöğüt
- Yenihacılarhanı
- Yeşilova
- Yeşilyurt
- Yirce
- Yorgalı
- Yörüklü
- Yukarıbeşpınar
