= Jamia =

Arabic word for gathering or university

Jamia (جامعة jāmi‘a; also jamiya[h]) is the Arabic word for gathering. It can also refer to a book Al-Jami'a or a mosque, or more generally, a university. In the latter sense it refers in official usage to a modern university, based on the Western model, as opposed to the medieval madrasa. The term seems to be a translation of "university" or the French "université" and emerged in the middle of the 19th century; the earliest definite use in this sense appears in 1906 in Egypt.

In Islamic economics, Jamia refers to a rotating savings and credit association commonly found in various communities, especially in Muslim majority countries. These associations involve members contributing money into a common pool on a regular basis, with each member taking turns receiving a lump sum from the pool. Jamia facilitates access to funds for various purposes without resorting to interest-based borrowing. Under sharia law, the payment of interest, known as riba, is forbidden due to its perceived exploitative nature of borrowers. Jamia in this case, offers a method that adheres to Islamic principles without resorting to interest-based borrowing.
