= Əmirli =

- Municipality
- Location within Azerbaijan Location within Karabakh Economic Region
- Coordinates: 40°13′20″N 47°08′55″E
- Country: Azerbaijan
- Rayon: Barda

Population
  - Total: 1,762
- Time zone: UTC+4 (AZT)
  - Summer (DST): UTC+5 (AZT)

Əmirli (also, İmirli) is a village and municipality in the Barda Rayon of Azerbaijan. It has a population of 1,762.

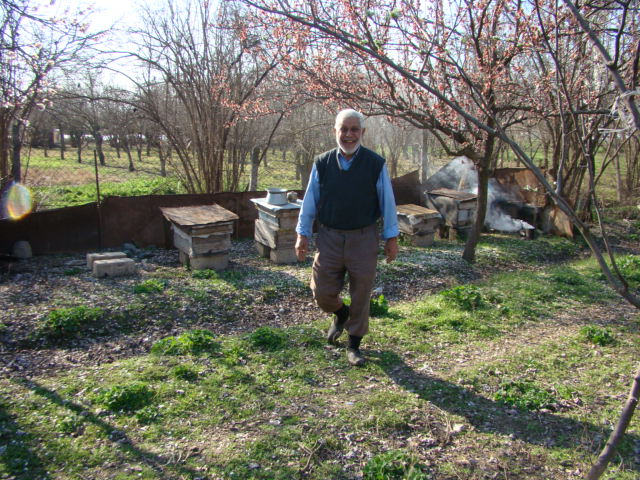
