= Sungurlu =

District in Çorum, Turkey

- Municipality
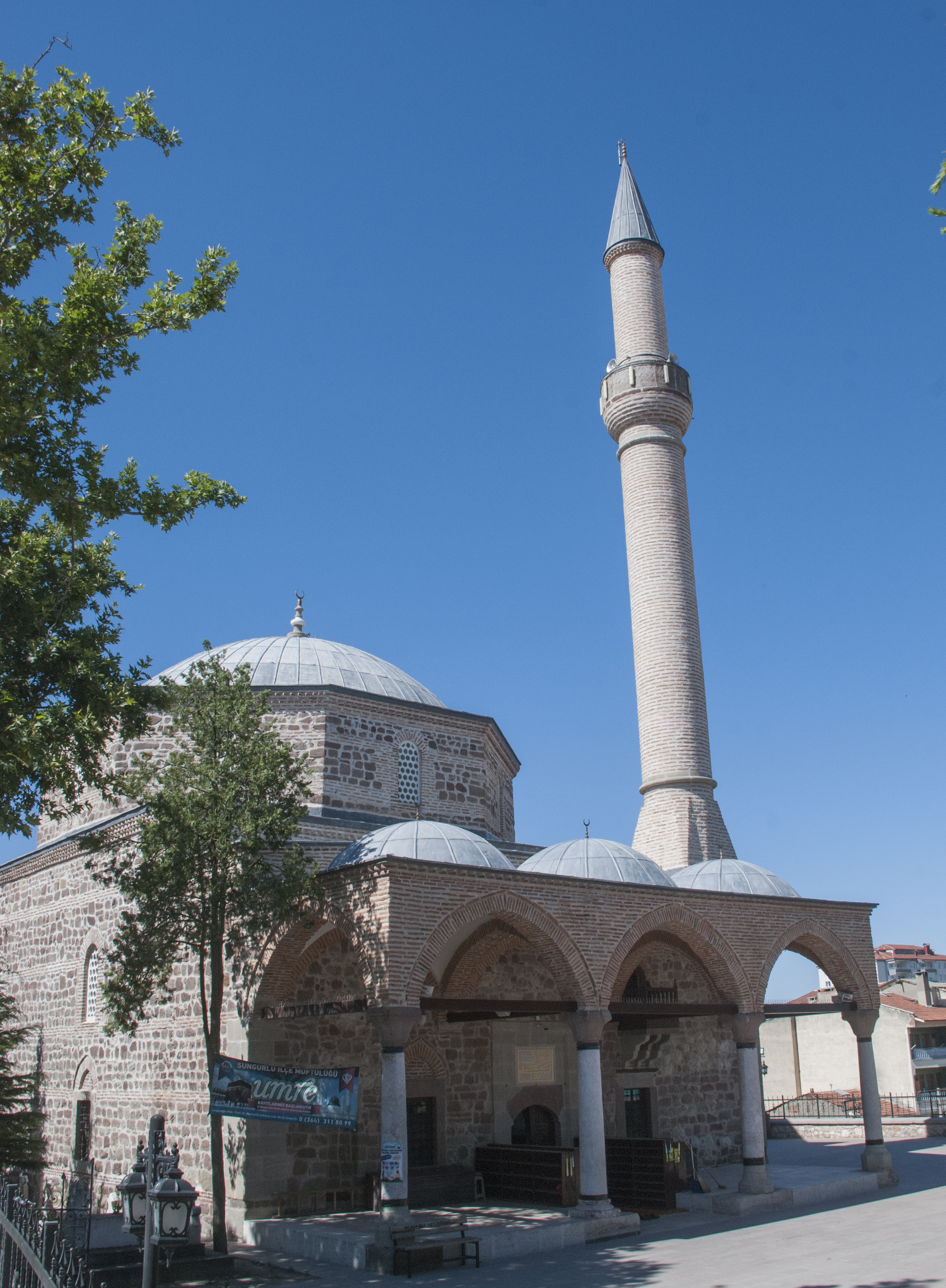

- Coat of arms

- Location within Turkey
- Coordinates: 40°09′40″N 34°22′37″E
- Country: Turkey
- Province: Çorum
- District: Sungurlu

Government
  - Mayor: Muhsin Dere (MHP)
- Population (2022): 30,275
- Time zone: UTC+3 (TRT)
- Area code: 0364
- Climate: Csa
- Website: sungurlu.bel.tr

Sungurlu is a town in Çorum Province in the Black Sea Region of Turkey, located 72 km south-west of the city of Çorum. It is the seat of Sungurlu District. Its population is 30,275 (2022). The mayor is Muhsin Dere (MHP).

Sungurlu is on the main road from the Turkish capital Ankara to the Black Sea city of Samsun, and is a popular stop for soup or snacks, including Çorum's famous roasted chick peas (leblebi), when traveling that route by bus. The town consists of 17 quarters: Başpınar, Fevzipaşa, İsmetpaşa, Sunguroğlu, Şekerpınar, Turan, Yenidoğan, Akçay, Bahçelievler, Gürpınar, Hacettepe, Yenihayat, Cevheri, Çiftlik, Akçakent, Fatih and Örnekevler.

Many of Turkey's leading socks manufacturers are from Sungurlu. There is a clock tower in the town, built in 1891.

== History ==
Sungurlu has been settled by Hittites, Assyrians, Phrygians, Cimmerians, Alexander the Great, Galatians, Ancient Romans, and Pontic Greeks. Following the defeat of Byzantium by the Turks at the battle of Malazgirt in 1071, the area was settled by Danishmend lords.

Sungurlu formerly was a village in Yozgat District of Sivas Province of Ottoman Empire. In 1872–73, there were 310 Armenian households, 250 Turkish households and 30 Greek households in the village. At the beginning of the 20th century, there were 1275 Armenians living in the village. Armenians were engaged in crafts, art and agriculture, especially blacksmithing and tailoring. There was Sb. Astvadzadzin Church in the village, while at the end of the 19th century, the Armenian Haygazian college had 200 students.

== See also ==
- Hüseyindede Tepe
