= List of populated places in Ankara Province =

A list of populated places in Ankara Province, Turkey by district:

== Akyurt ==
- Ahmetadil, Akyurt
- Akyurt, Ankara
- Balıkhisar, Akyurt
- Bozca, Akyurt
- Büğdüz, Akyurt
- Cücük, Akyurt
- Doğanoluk, Akyurt
- Elecik, Akyurt
- Güzelhisar, Akyurt
- Haydar, Akyurt
- Karacakaya, Akyurt
- Karacalar, Akyurt
- Karayatak, Akyurt
- Kozayağı, Akyurt
- Kızık, Akyurt
- Saracalar, Akyurt
- Uzunlar, Akyurt
- Çam, Akyurt
- Çardakbağı, Akyurt
- Çınar, Akyurt
- Şeyhler, Akyurt

== Ayaş ==
- Akkaya, Ayaş
- Ayaş
- Bayat, Ayaş
- Başayaş, Ayaş
- Başbereket, Ayaş
- Evci, Ayaş
- Feruz, Ayaş
- Gençali, Ayaş
- Gökler, Ayaş
- Gökçebağ, Ayaş
- Ilıca, Ayaş
- Ortabereket, Ayaş
- Pınaryaka, Ayaş
- Sinanlı, Ayaş
- Tekkeköy, Ayaş
- Ulupınar, Ayaş
- Uğurçayırı, Ayaş
- Yağmurdede, Ayaş
- Çanıllı, Ayaş
- İlhan, Ayaş

== Bala ==
- Abazlı, Bala
- Afşar, Bala
- Ahmetçayırı, Bala
- Akarlar, Bala
- Akörençarşak, Bala
- Altınçanak, Bala
- Aydoğan, Bala
- Aşağıhacıbekir, Bala
- Aşıkoğlu, Bala
- Bahçekaradalak, Bala
- Balâ
- Bağiçi, Bala
- Bektaşlı, Bala
- Belçarsak, Bala
- Beynam, Bala
- Buyukdavdanlı, Bala
- Büyükboyalık, Bala
- Büyükbıyık, Bala
- Büyükcamili, Bala
- Davdanlı, Bala
- Derekışla, Bala
- Erdemli, Bala
- Ergin, Bala
- Evciler, Bala
- Eğribasan, Bala
- Gülbağı, Bala
- Hanburun, Bala
- Karahamzalı, Bala
- Keklicek, Bala
- Kerişli, Bala
- Kesikköprü, Bala
- Koçyayla, Bala
- Kömürcü, Bala
- Köseli, Bala
- Küçükbayat, Bala
- Küçükboyalık, Bala
- Küçükbıyık, Bala
- Küçükcamili, Bala
- Sarıhüyük, Bala
- Sehrıban, Bala
- Sofular, Bala
- Suyugüzel, Bala
- Sırapınar, Bala
- Tatarhüyük, Bala
- Tepeköy, Bala
- Tolköy, Bala
- Yaylaköy, Bala
- Yaylalıözü, Bala
- Yeniköy, Bala
- Yeniyapançarşak, Bala
- Yeniyapanşeyhli, Bala
- Yukarıhacıbekir, Bala
- Yöreli, Bala
- Çatalçeşme, Bala
- Çatalören, Bala
- Çiğdemli, Bala
- Üçem, Bala
- Şehriban, Bala

== Beypazarı ==
- Acısu, Beypazarı
- Adaören, Beypazarı
- Akçakavak, Beypazarı
- Akçalı, Beypazarı
- Aşağıgüney, Beypazarı
- Batça, Beypazarı
- Bağözü, Beypazarı
- Başören, Beypazarı
- Beypazarı
- Boyalı, Beypazarı
- Dağşeyhler, Beypazarı
- Dereli, Beypazarı
- Dibecik, Beypazarı
- Dibekören, Beypazarı
- Dikmen, Beypazarı
- Doğanyurt, Beypazarı
- Doğançalı, Beypazarı
- Dudaş, Beypazarı
- Fasıl, Beypazarı
- Geyikpınarı, Beypazarı
- Gürsöğüt, Beypazarı
- Harmancık, Beypazarı
- Haydarlar, Beypazarı
- Hırkatepe, Beypazarı
- Kabaca, Beypazarı
- Kabalar, Beypazarı
- Kaplan, Beypazarı
- Kapullu, Beypazarı
- Karacaören, Beypazarı
- Karaören, Beypazarı
- Karaşar, Beypazarı
- Kargı, Beypazarı
- Kayabükü, Beypazarı
- Kerbanlar, Beypazarı
- Kozalan, Beypazarı
- Kozağaç, Beypazarı
- Kurtkovan, Beypazarı
- Kuyucak, Beypazarı
- Kuyumcutekke, Beypazarı
- Köseler, Beypazarı
- Köstköy, Beypazarı
- Kırbaşı, Beypazarı
- Kırşeyhler, Beypazarı
- Kızılcasöğüt, Beypazarı
- Macun, Beypazarı
- Mahmutlar, Beypazarı
- Mençeler, Beypazarı
- Mikail, Beypazarı
- Nuhhoca, Beypazarı
- Oymaağaç, Beypazarı
- Sarıağıl, Beypazarı
- Sekli, Beypazarı
- Sopçaalan, Beypazarı
- Tacettin, Beypazarı
- Tahir, Beypazarı
- Uruş, Beypazarı
- Uşakgöl, Beypazarı
- Yalnızçam, Beypazarı
- Yiğerler, Beypazarı
- Yoğunpelit, Beypazarı
- Yukarıgüney, Beypazarı
- Yukarıulucak, Beypazarı
- Yıldız, Beypazarı
- Çakıloba, Beypazarı
- Çantırlı, Beypazarı
- Üreğil, Beypazarı
- İncepelit, Beypazarı

== Elmadağ ==
- Akçaali, Elmadağ
- Aşağıkamışlı, Elmadağ
- Deliler, Elmadağ
- Ediğe, Elmadağ
- Elmadağ, Ankara
- Karacahasan, Elmadağ
- Kayadibi, Elmadağ
- Kuşçuali, Elmadağ
- Süleymanlı, Elmadağ
- Taburlar, Elmadağ
- Tekkeköy, Elmadağ
- Yukarıkamışlı, Elmadağ

== Evren ==
- Altınbaşak, Evren
- Cebirli, Evren
- Demirayak, Evren
- Solakuşağı, Evren
- Torunobası, Evren
- Yusufuşağı, Evren
- Çatalpınar, Evren
- İbrahimbeyli, Evren
- İnebeyli, Evren

== Gölbaşı ==
- Ahiboz, Gölbaşı
- Ballıkpınar, Gölbaşı
- Bezirhane, Gölbaşı
- Dikilitaş, Gölbaşı
- Gökçehüyük, Gölbaşı
- Gölbaşı, Ankara
- Gölbek, Gölbaşı
- Günalan, Gölbaşı
- Hacıhasan, Gölbaşı
- Hacımuratlı, Gölbaşı
- Hallaçlı, Gölbaşı
- Karaali, Gölbaşı
- Karacaören, Gölbaşı
- Karagedik, Gölbaşı
- Karaoğlan, Gölbaşı
- Koparan, Gölbaşı
- Kırıklı, Gölbaşı
- Kızılcaşar, Gölbaşı
- Mahmatlı, Gölbaşı
- Mahmatlıbahçe, Gölbaşı
- Oyaca, Gölbaşı
- Oğulbey, Gölbaşı
- Selametli, Gölbaşı
- Soğulcak, Gölbaşı
- Subaşı, Gölbaşı
- Taşpınar, Gölbaşı
- Tepeyurt, Gölbaşı
- Topaklı, Gölbaşı
- Tulumtaş, Gölbaşı
- Velihimmetli, Gölbaşı
- Yavrucak, Gölbaşı
- Yaylabağ, Gölbaşı
- Yağlıpınar, Gölbaşı
- Yurtbeyi, Gölbaşı
- Çayırlı, Gölbaşı
- Çeltek, Gölbaşı
- Çimşit, Gölbaşı
- Örencik, Gölbaşı
- İkizce, Gölbaşı
- İncek, Gölbaşı

== Güdül ==
- Adalıkuzu, Güdül
- Afşar, Güdül
- Akbaş, Güdül
- Akçakese, Güdül
- Boyalı, Güdül
- Garipçe, Güdül
- Güdül, Ankara
- Güzel, Güdül
- Hacılar, Güdül
- Kadıobası, Güdül
- Kamanlar, Güdül
- Karacaören, Güdül
- Kavaközü, Güdül
- Kayı, Güdül
- Kırkkavak, Güdül
- Meyvabükü, Güdül
- Salihler, Güdül
- Sapanlı, Güdül
- Sorgun, Güdül
- Tahtacıörencik, Güdül
- Taşören, Güdül
- Yelli, Güdül
- Yeşilöz, Güdül
- Çağa, Güdül
- Çukurören, Güdül
- Özköy, Güdül
- Özçaltı, Güdül

== Haymana ==
- Ahırlıkuyu, Haymana
- Aktepe, Haymana
- Alahacılı, Haymana
- Altıpınar, Haymana
- Ataköy, Haymana
- Bahçecik, Haymana
- Balçıkhisar, Haymana
- Bostanhüyük, Haymana
- Boyalık, Haymana
- Boğazkaya, Haymana
- Bumsuz, Haymana
- Büyükkonakgörmez, Haymana
- Büyükyağcı, Haymana
- Cihanşah, Haymana
- Cingirli, Haymana
- Culuk, Haymana
- Demirözü, Haymana
- Dereköy, Haymana
- Deveci, Hayamana
- Deveci, Haymana
- Devecipınarı, Haymana
- Durupınar, Haymana
- Durutlar, Haymana
- Emirler, Haymana
- Esen, Haymana
- Eskikışla, Haymana
- Evci, Haymana
- Evliyafakı, Haymana
- Gedik, Haymana
- Gedikli, Haymana
- Güzelcekale, Haymana
- Haymana
- Karahoca, Haymana
- Karapınar, Haymana
- Karasüleymanlı, Haymana
- Karaömerli, Haymana
- Katrancı, Haymana
- Kavakköy, Haymana
- Kerpiçköy, Haymana
- Kesikkavak, Haymana
- Kirazoğlu, Haymana
- Kutluhan, Haymana
- Küçükkonakgörmez, Haymana
- Küçükyağcı, Haymana
- Kızılkoyunlu, Haymana
- Pınarbaşı, Haymana
- Saatli, Haymana
- Sarıdeğirmen, Haymana
- Sarıgöl, Haymana
- Sazağası, Haymana
- Serinyayla, Haymana
- Sinanlı, Haymana
- Sincik, Haymana
- Sindiran, Haymana
- Soğulca, Haymana
- Söğüttepe, Haymana
- Sırçasaray, Haymana
- Tabaklı, Haymana
- Tepeköy, Haymana
- Toyçayırı, Haymana
- Türkhüyük, Haymana
- Türkşerefli, Haymana
- Yamak, Haymana
- Yaprakbayırı, Haymana
- Yaylabeyi, Haymana
- Yeniköy, Haymana
- Yergömü, Haymana
- Yeşilköy, Haymana
- Yeşilyurt, Haymana
- Yukarısebil, Haymana
- Yurtbeyli, Haymana
- Çalış, Haymana
- Çayraz, Haymana
- Çeltikli, Haymana
- İncirli, Haymana
- Şerefligöközü, Haymana

== Kalecik ==
- Afşar, Kalecik
- Akkaynak, Kalecik
- Akkuzulu, Kalecik
- Aktepe, Kalecik
- Akçataş, Kalecik
- Alibeyli, Kalecik
- Altıntaş, Kalecik
- Arkbörk, Kalecik
- Beykavağı, Kalecik
- Buğra, Kalecik
- Dağdemir, Kalecik
- Demirtaş, Kalecik
- Değirmenkaya, Kalecik
- Elmapınar, Kalecik
- Eskiköy, Kalecik
- Eşmedere, Kalecik
- Gökdere, Kalecik
- Gökçeören, Kalecik
- Gölköy, Kalecik
- Gümüşpınar, Kalecik
- Hacıköy, Kalecik
- Hancılı, Kalecik
- Hasayaz, Kalecik
- Kalecik, Ankara
- Karahüyük, Kalecik
- Karalar, Kalecik
- Karatepe, Kalecik
- Kargın, Kalecik
- Keklicek, Kalecik
- Koyunbaba, Kalecik
- Kuyucak, Kalecik
- Kılçak, Kalecik
- Kınık, Kalecik
- Kızılkaya, Kalecik
- Mahmutlar, Kalecik
- Samanlıkköy, Kalecik
- Satılarköy, Kalecik
- Tavşancık, Kalecik
- Tilkiköy, Kalecik
- Uyurca, Kalecik
- Yalımköy, Kalecik
- Yeniçöte, Kalecik
- Yeşilöz, Kalecik
- Yurtyenice, Kalecik
- Yüzbeyli, Kalecik
- Yılanlı, Kalecik
- Çandır, Kalecik
- Çaykaya, Kalecik
- Çiftlikköy, Kalecik
- Şemsettinköy, Kalecik
- Şeyhmahmut, Kalecik

== Kazan ==
- Ahi, Kazan
- Akçaören, Kazan
- Alpagut, Kazan
- Aşağıkaraören, Kahramankazan
- Aydın, Kazan
- Bitik, Kazan
- Ciğir, Kazan
- Dağyaka, Kazan
- Dutözü, Kazan
- Emirgazi, Kazan
- Fethiye, Kazan
- Günbaşı, Kazan
- Güvenç, Kazan
- Karalar, Kazan
- Kazan, Ankara
- Kumpınar, Kazan
- Kılıçlar, Kazan
- Kınık, Kazan
- Kışla, Kazan
- Orhaniye, Kazan
- Örencik, Kazan
- Peçenek, Kazan
- Sancar, Kazan
- Saray, Kazan
- Sarıayak, Kazan
- Sarılar, Kazan
- Soğulcak, Kazan
- Tekke, Kazan
- Uçarı, Kazan
- Yakupderviş, Kazan
- Yassıören, Kazan
- Yayalar, Kazan
- Yazıbeyli, Kazan
- Çalta, Kazan
- Çimşit, Kazan
- İmrendi, Kazan
- İnceğiz, Kazan
- İne, Kazan
- İymir, Kazan
- İçören, Kazan

== Kızılcahamam ==
- Adaköy, Kızılcahamam
- Akdoğan, Kızılcahamam
- Aksak, Kızılcahamam
- Alibey, Kızılcahamam
- Alpagut, Kızılcahamam
- Ayvacık, Kızılcahamam
- Aşağıadaköy, Kızılcahamam
- Aşağıhüyük, Kızılcahamam
- Aşağıkese, Kızılcahamam
- Aşağıçanlı, Kızılcahamam
- Bademli, Kızılcahamam
- Balcılar, Kızılcahamam
- Bayırköy, Kızılcahamam
- Bağlıca, Kızılcahamam
- Bağören, Kızılcahamam
- Başağaç, Kızılcahamam
- Başören, Kızılcahamam
- Belpınar, Kızılcahamam
- Berçinyayalar, Kızılcahamam
- Berçinçatak, Kızılcahamam
- Bezcikuzören, Kızılcahamam
- Beşkonak, Kızılcahamam
- Binkoz, Kızılcahamam
- Bulak, Kızılcahamam
- Ciğirler, Kızılcahamam
- Demirciören, Kızılcahamam
- Değirmenönü, Kızılcahamam
- Doymuşören, Kızılcahamam
- Doğanözü, Kızılcahamam
- Esenler, Kızılcahamam
- Eğerlialören, Kızılcahamam
- Eğerlibaşköy, Kızılcahamam
- Eğerlidereköy, Kızılcahamam
- Eğerlikozören, Kızılcahamam
- Gebeler, Kızılcahamam
- Gökbel, Kızılcahamam
- Gölköy, Kızılcahamam
- Gümele, Kızılcahamam
- Güneysaray, Kızılcahamam
- Güvem, Kızılcahamam
- Hıdırlar, Kızılcahamam
- Kalemler, Kızılcahamam
- Karaağaç, Kızılcahamam
- Karacaören, Kızılcahamam
- Kasımlar, Kızılcahamam
- Kavaközü, Kızılcahamam
- Kocalar, Kızılcahamam
- Kurumcu, Kızılcahamam
- Kuşcuören, Kızılcahamam
- Kınık (Aşağı), Kızılcahamam
- Kınık (Yukarı), Kızılcahamam
- Kırköy, Kızılcahamam
- Kırkırca, Kızılcahamam
- Kızık, Kızılcahamam
- Kızılca, Kızılcahamam
- Kızılcahamam
- Kızılcaören, Kızılcahamam
- Kışlak, Kızılcahamam
- Mahkemeağcin, Kızılcahamam
- Olucak, Kızılcahamam
- Ortaköy, Kızılcahamam
- Otacı, Kızılcahamam
- Oğlakçı, Kızılcahamam
- P.başören, Kızılcahamam
- Pazar, Kızılcahamam
- Salın, Kızılcahamam
- Saraycık, Kızılcahamam
- Sarayköy, Kızılcahamam
- Saraçköy, Kızılcahamam
- Sazak, Kızılcahamam
- Semeler, Kızılcahamam
- Semer, Kızılcahamam
- Süleler, Kızılcahamam
- Tahtalar, Kızılcahamam
- Taşlıca, Kızılcahamam
- Turnalı, Kızılcahamam
- Ugurlu, Kızılcahamam
- Yakakaya, Kızılcahamam
- Yanık, Kızılcahamam
- Yağcıhüseyin, Kızılcahamam
- Yeni Dereneci, Kızılcahamam
- Yeşilköy, Kızılcahamam
- Yukarıhüyük, Kızılcahamam
- Yukarıkaraören, Kızılcahamam
- Yukarıkese, Kızılcahamam
- Yukarıçanlı, Kızılcahamam
- Yıldırımdemirciler, Kızılcahamam
- Yıldırımhacılar, Kızılcahamam
- Yıldırımyağlıca, Kızılcahamam
- Yıldırımçatak, Kızılcahamam
- Yıldırımören, Kızılcahamam
- Çalta, Kızılcahamam
- Çavuşlar, Kızılcahamam
- Çeltikçi, Kızılcahamam
- Çeçtepe, Kızılcahamam
- Çukurca, Kızılcahamam
- Çukurören, Kızılcahamam
- Çırpan, Kızılcahamam
- Örencik, Kızılcahamam
- Üyücek, Kızılcahamam
- Üçbaş, Kızılcahamam
- İnceğiz, Kızılcahamam
- İyceler, Kızılcahamam
- İğdir, Kızılcahamam
- İğmir, Kızılcahamam
- Şahinler, Kızılcahamam

== Nallıhan ==
- Akdere, Nallıhan
- Aksu, Nallıhan
- Alanköy, Nallıhan
- Aliefe, Nallıhan
- Alpağut, Nallıhan
- Arkutça, Nallıhan
- Atça, Nallıhan
- Aydoğmuş, Nallıhan
- Aşağıbağdere, Nallıhan
- Aşağıbağlıca, Nallıhan
- Aşağıkavacık, Nallıhan
- Belenalan, Nallıhan
- Belenören, Nallıhan
- Beyalan, Nallıhan
- Beycik, Nallıhan
- Beydili, Nallıhan
- Bozyaka, Nallıhan
- Cendere, Nallıhan
- Danişment, Nallıhan
- Davutoğlan, Nallıhan
- Demirköy, Nallıhan
- Dereköy, Nallıhan
- Doğandere, Nallıhan
- Döğmeci, Nallıhan
- Emremsultan, Nallıhan
- Epçeler, Nallıhan
- Ericek, Nallıhan
- Eymir, Nallıhan
- Eğriköy, Nallıhan
- Gökçeöz, Nallıhan
- Güzelöz, Nallıhan
- Hacıhasanlar, Nallıhan
- Hıdırlar, Nallıhan
- Kabaca, Nallıhan
- Kadıköy, Nallıhan
- Karacasu, Nallıhan
- Karahisar, Nallıhan
- Karahisargölcük, Nallıhan
- Karahisarkozlu, Nallıhan
- Karaköy, Nallıhan
- Kavakköy, Nallıhan
- Kulu, Nallıhan
- Kuruca, Nallıhan
- Kuzucular, Nallıhan
- Meyildere, Nallıhan
- Meyilhacılar, Nallıhan
- Nallıdere, Nallıhan
- Nallıgölcük, Nallıhan
- Nallıhan
- Nebioğlu, Nallıhan
- Osmanköy, Nallıhan
- Ozanköy, Nallıhan
- Sarıkaya, Nallıhan
- Soğukkuyu, Nallıhan
- Subaşı, Nallıhan
- Tekirler, Nallıhan
- Tekkeköy, Nallıhan
- Tepeköy, Nallıhan
- Uluhan, Nallıhan
- Uluköy, Nallıhan
- Uzunöz, Nallıhan
- Yakapınar, Nallıhan
- Yenice, Nallıhan
- Yeşilyurt, Nallıhan
- Yukarıbağdere, Nallıhan
- Yukarıbağlıca, Nallıhan
- Yukarıkavacık, Nallıhan
- Çalıcaalan, Nallıhan
- Çamalan, Nallıhan
- Çayırhan, Nallıhan
- Çiller, Nallıhan
- Çive, Nallıhan
- Çulhalar, Nallıhan
- Ömerşeyhler, Nallıhan
- Öşürler, Nallıhan
- İslamalanı, Nallıhan

== Polatlı ==
- Adatoprakpınar, Polatlı
- Avdanlı, Polatlı
- Avşar, Polatlı
- Babayakup, Polatlı
- Basri, Polatlı
- Beyceğiz, Polatlı
- Beylikköprü, Polatlı
- Beşköprü, Polatlı
- Eskikarsak, Polatlı
- Eskiköseler, Polatlı
- Eskipolatlı, Polatlı
- Gedikli, Polatlı
- Gençali, Polatlı
- Gülpınar, Polatlı
- Gümüşyaka, Polatlı
- Gündoğan, Polatlı
- Güreş, Polatlı
- Hacımusa, Polatlı
- Hacımuslu, Polatlı
- Hacıosmanoğlu, Polatlı
- Hacıtuğrul, Polatlı
- Hıdırşeyh, Polatlı
- Ilıca, Polatlı
- Kabakköy, Polatlı
- Karaahmet, Polatlı
- Karabenli, Polatlı
- Karacaahmet, Polatlı
- Karahamzalı, Polatlı
- Karailyas, Polatlı
- Karakaya, Polatlı
- Karakuyu, Polatlı
- Karapınar, Polatlı
- Karayavşan, Polatlı
- Kargalı, Polatlı
- Kayabaşı, Polatlı
- Kocahacılı, Polatlı
- Kuşçu, Polatlı
- Kıranharmanı, Polatlı
- Kızılcakışla, Polatlı
- Macun, Polatlı
- Müslüm, Polatlı
- Olukpınar, Polatlı
- Oğuzlar, Polatlı
- Polatlı
- Poyraz, Polatlı
- Sabanca, Polatlı
- Sakarya, Polatlı
- Sarıhalil, Polatlı
- Sarıoba, Polatlı
- Sazlar, Polatlı
- Sinanlı, Polatlı
- Sincik, Polatlı
- Sivri, Polatlı
- Tatlıkuyu, Polatlı
- Taşpınar, Polatlı
- Toydemir, Polatlı
- Tüfekçioğlu, Polatlı
- Türkkarsak, Polatlı
- Türktaciri, Polatlı
- Uzunbeyli, Polatlı
- Yaralı, Polatlı
- Yassıhüyük, Polatlı
- Yağcıoğlu, Polatlı
- Yağmurbaba, Polatlı
- Yenice, Polatlı
- Yenidoğan, Polatlı
- Yeniköseler, Polatlı
- Yenimehmetli, Polatlı
- Yeşilöz, Polatlı
- Yüzükbaşı, Polatlı
- Yıldızlı, Polatlı
- Çanakçı, Polatlı
- Çekirdeksiz, Polatlı
- Çimenceğiz, Polatlı
- Ömerler, Polatlı
- Ördekgölü, Polatlı
- Özyurt, Polatlı
- Üçpınar, Polatlı
- İğciler, Polatlı
- Şabanözü, Polatlı
- Şeyhahmetli, Polatlı
- Şeyhali, Polatlı

== Çamlıdere ==
- Ahatlar, Çamlıdere
- Akkaya, Çamlıdere
- Alakoç, Çamlıdere
- Atça, Çamlıdere
- Avdan, Çamlıdere
- Avşarlar, Çamlıdere
- Bardakçılar, Çamlıdere
- Bayındır, Çamlıdere
- Buğralar, Çamlıdere
- Bükeler, Çamlıdere
- Dağkuzören, Çamlıdere
- Doymuş, Çamlıdere
- Doğancı, Çamlıdere
- Doğanlar, Çamlıdere
- Eldelek, Çamlıdere
- Elmalı, Çamlıdere
- Elvanlar, Çamlıdere
- Elören, Çamlıdere
- Gümele, Çamlıdere
- Güney, Çamlıdere
- Kuyubaşı, Çamlıdere
- Kuşçular, Çamlıdere
- Meşeler, Çamlıdere
- Muzrupağacın, Çamlıdere
- Müsellim, Çamlıdere
- Osmansin, Çamlıdere
- Ozmuş, Çamlıdere
- Pelitçik, Çamlıdere
- Sarıkavak, Çamlıdere
- Tatlak, Çamlıdere
- Yahşihan, Çamlıdere
- Yediören, Çamlıdere
- Yoncatepe, Çamlıdere
- Yılanlı, Çamlıdere
- Çamköy, Çamlıdere
- Çamlıdere, Ankara
- Çukurören, Çamlıdere
- Örenköy, Çamlıdere
- İnceöz, Çamlıdere

== Çubuk ==
- Abadan, Çubuk
- Akbayır, Çubuk
- Akkuzulu, Çubuk
- Avcıova, Çubuk
- Ağılcık, Çubuk
- Aşağıemirler, Çubuk
- Aşağıobruk, Çubuk
- Aşağıçavundur, Çubuk
- Camili, Çubuk
- Dalyasan, Çubuk
- Dağkalfat, Çubuk
- Dedeler, Çubuk
- Demirci, Çubuk
- Dumlupınar, Çubuk
- Durhasan, Çubuk
- Esenboğa, Çubuk
- Eskiçöte, Çubuk
- Eğriekin, Çubuk
- Gökçedere, Çubuk
- Güldarbı, Çubuk
- Gümüşyayla, Çubuk
- Hacılar, Çubuk
- Kapaklı, Çubuk
- Karaağaç, Çubuk
- Karadana, Çubuk
- Karaköy, Çubuk
- Karaman, Çubuk
- Karataş, Çubuk
- Karaçam, Çubuk
- Kargın, Çubuk
- Karşıyaka, Çubuk
- Kavaklı, Çubuk
- Kuruçay, Çubuk
- Kutuören, Çubuk
- Kuyumcuköy, Çubuk
- Kösrelik, Çubuk
- Kösrelikkızığı, Çubuk
- Küçükali, Çubuk
- Kızılca, Çubuk
- Kızılören, Çubuk
- Kızılöz, Çubuk
- Kışlacık, Çubuk
- Mahmutoğlan, Çubuk
- Melikşah, Çubuk
- Meşeli, Çubuk
- Mutlu, Çubuk
- Nusratlar, Çubuk
- Okçular, Çubuk
- Ovacık, Çubuk
- Oyumiğde, Çubuk
- Saraycık, Çubuk
- Sarıkoz, Çubuk
- Sarısu, Çubuk
- Sele, Çubuk
- Sirkeli, Çubuk
- Susuz, Çubuk
- Sünlü, Çubuk
- Sığırlıhacı, Çubuk
- Tahtayazı, Çubuk
- Taşpınar, Çubuk
- Tuğlaköy, Çubuk
- Uluağaç, Çubuk
- Yakuphasan, Çubuk
- Yaylak, Çubuk
- Yazlıca, Çubuk
- Yazır, Çubuk
- Yenice, Çubuk
- Yeşilkent, Çubuk
- Yiğitli, Çubuk
- Yukarıemirler, Çubuk
- Yukarıobruk, Çubuk
- Yukarıçavundur, Çubuk
- Yuva, Çubuk
- Yıldırımaydoğan, Çubuk
- Yıldırımelören, Çubuk
- Yıldırımevci, Çubuk
- Yılmazköy, Çubuk
- Çatköy, Çubuk
- Çitköy, Çubuk
- Çubuk, Ankara
- Ömercik, Çubuk
- Özlüce, Çubuk
- İkipınar, Çubuk
- İmamhüseyin, Çubuk

== Şereflikoçhisar ==
- Acıkuyu, Şereflikoçhisar
- Acıöz, Şereflikoçhisar
- Akarca, Şereflikoçhisar
- Akin, Şereflikoçhisar
- Aktaş, Şereflikoçhisar
- Aliuşağı, Şereflikoçhisar
- Baltalı, Şereflikoçhisar
- Bağobası, Şereflikoçhisar
- Büyükdamlacık, Şereflikoçhisar
- Büyükkışla, Şereflikoçhisar
- Deliler, Şereflikoçhisar
- Devekovan, Şereflikoçhisar
- Değirmenyolu, Şereflikoçhisar
- Doğankaya, Şereflikoçhisar
- Eley, Şereflikoçhisar
- Fadıllı, Şereflikoçhisar
- Geçitli, Şereflikoçhisar
- Hacıbektaşlı, Şereflikoçhisar
- Hamzalı, Şereflikoçhisar
- Haydarlı, Şereflikoçhisar
- Kadıncık, Şereflikoçhisar
- Kadıobası, Şereflikoçhisar
- Karabük, Şereflikoçhisar
- Karamollauşağı, Şereflikoçhisar
- Karandere, Şereflikoçhisar
- Kaçarlı, Şereflikoçhisar
- Kurutlutepe, Şereflikoçhisar
- Küçükdamlacık, Şereflikoçhisar
- Musular, Şereflikoçhisar
- Odunboğazı, Şereflikoçhisar
- Palazobası, Şereflikoçhisar
- Sadıklı, Şereflikoçhisar
- Seymenli, Şereflikoçhisar
- Vayvay, Şereflikoçhisar
- Yanlızpınar, Şereflikoçhisar
- Yazısöğüt, Şereflikoçhisar
- Yeşilyurt, Şereflikoçhisar
- Yusufkuyusu, Şereflikoçhisar
- Çalören, Şereflikoçhisar
- Çatçat, Şereflikoçhisar
- Çavuşköy, Şereflikoçhisar
- Çayırönü, Şereflikoçhisar
- Çıngıl, Şereflikoçhisar
- Üzengilik, Şereflikoçhisar
- Şanlıkışla, Şereflikoçhisar
- Şekerköy, Şereflikoçhisar
- Şereflidavutlu, Şereflikoçhisar
- Şereflikoçhisar
- Şeyhli, Şereflikoçhisar

== Recent development ==
According to Law act no 6360, all Turkish provinces with a population more than 750 000, were renamed as metropolitan municipality. All districts in those provinces became second level municipalities and all villages in those districts were renamed as a neighborhoods . Thus the villages listed above are officially neighborhoods of Ankara.
