= Qiniq (tribe) =

Oghuz-Turkmen tribe

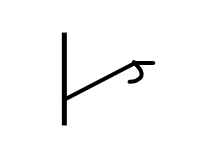
- Tamgha of the Kinik tribe according to Mahmud al-Kashgari

Regions with significant populations
- Azerbaijan, Turkey, Turkmenistan, Iran

Languages
- Oghuz Turkic

Religion
- Islam

Related ethnic groups
- Oghuz Turks

The Qiniq (Azerbaijani: Qınıq; Turkish: Kınık; Turkmen: Gynyk; Persian: قنق, also spelled Qïnïq, Qynyk or Qynyq) were an Oghuz Turk (Turkoman) tribe.

== Oghuz tribes ==
The Oghuz Turks were a branch of Turkic peoples. In the early medieval ages, most of them were nomads and their political structure was tribal. There were 22 or 24 Oghuz tribes. The tribes were listed in a number of medieval books, with Islamic sources calling Muslim Oghuz Turks as Turkmen by the 10th century. They were also mentioned in Oghuz legend. According to the myth, there were 24 tribes in two main groups. Each group was represented by three brothers and each brother was supposed to have four sons. In this classification Qiniq tribe is the descendant of Deniz Khan who in turn was in the group of Üçok.

== Etymology ==
According to the Islam Encyclopedia, Kınık means "Great everywhere". In Mahmud al-Kashgari's 11th-century Dīwān Lughāt al-Turk 'Compendium of the languages of the Turks', the Qiniq are listed first. However, in the list arranged by Rashid al-Din Hamadani in the 13th century, the Qiniq come last. In his work Shajara-i Tarākima 'Genealogy of Oghuz Turks', Abu al-Ghazi Bahadur, the khan and historian of the Khanate of Khiva, mentioned the Qiniq tribe as descendants of Tengiz Khan with the name of the tribe meaning "honourable".

However, according to Turkologist and professor emeritus Peter Benjamin Golden, the name comes from Turkic qın- "to long for, covet," in Oghuz qınıq- "to feel appetite, to desire ardently", or qınıq "greedy". Golden considers this one of the tribal names derived from terms expressing military power, force, and aggression (e.g. Salğur, Yagma).

== Qiniq and the Seljuks ==
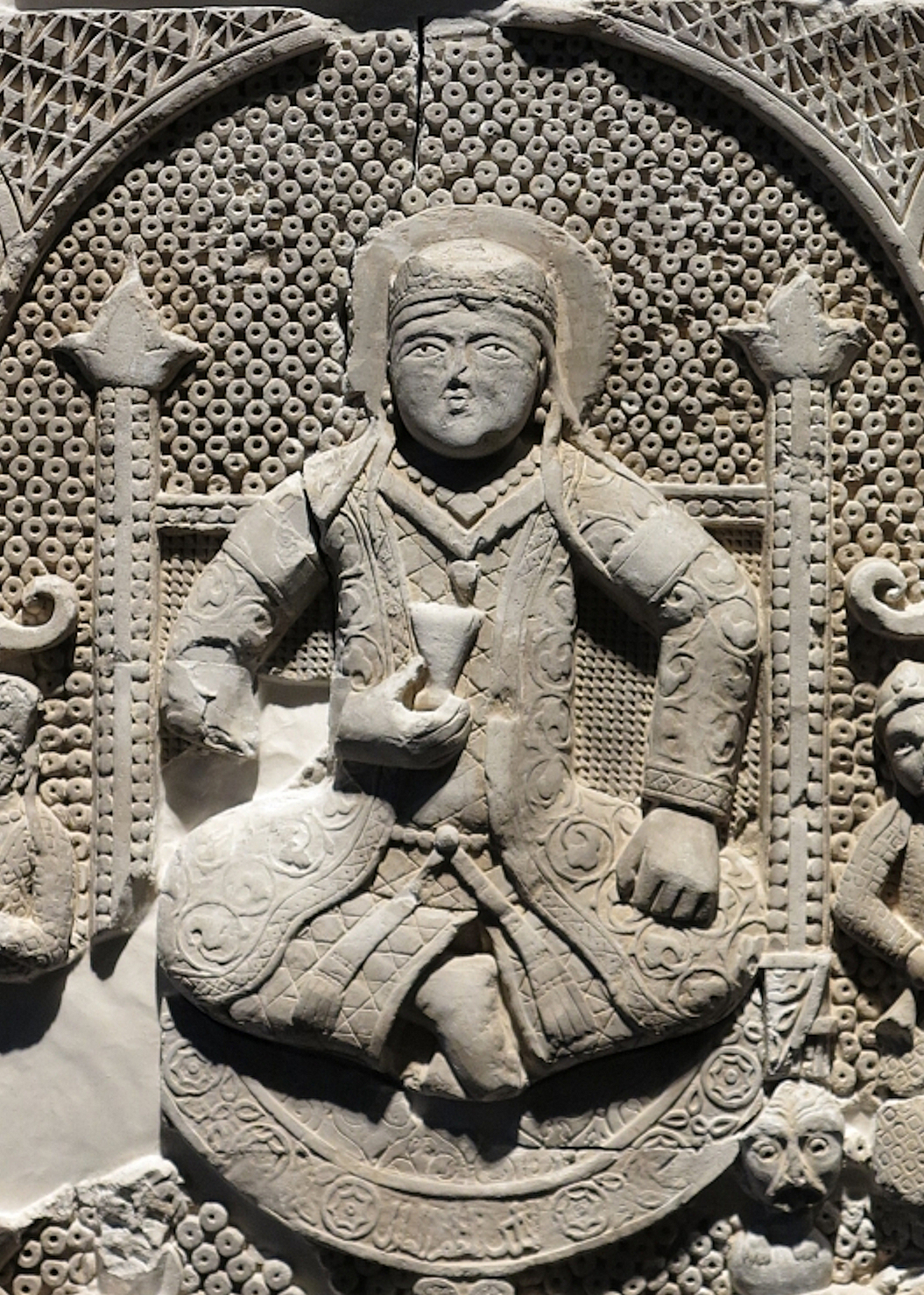
Enthroned figure usually identified as the last Seljuk Empire ruler Tughril III (1176–1194), from Rayy, Iran. Philadelphia Museum of Art.

Qiniq is historically notable because the Seljuk Empire was founded by the representatives of the Qiniq tribe. In the 10th century the tribe leader was Dukak (nicknamed Demiryaylı, "with iron bow"). He was followed by his son Seljuk and then grandson Arslan Yabgu. The Seljuk Empire was founded by Arslan's nephews Tughril and Chaghri. The Seljuks of Anatolia, a branch of Seljuks, was founded by Suleiman ibn Qutalmish, Arslan Yabgu's grandson.

Abu al-Ghazi Bahadur wrote in his Shajara-i Tarākima the following:

"When Seljuks became masters of the Muslim world, they said: "We are of the Kinik tribe of the Turkmens," and then they said, "We fled from Kay Khosrow, the son of Afrasiab, and became the Kinik tribe of the Turkmens." The Seljuks counted their fathers and stopped at Afrasiab after 35 generations, saying that they were the sons and descendants of Afrasiab."

== Qiniq in Anatolia ==
Most of the Qiniq migrated to Anatolia during the reign of the Seljuk Empire and the Mongol invasions in the 13th century. In the Ottoman official records of the 16th century, there were 81 settlements named Kınık. Although they have been largely absorbed by other Oghuz tribes throughout the history, there are still many settlements which bear the name Kınık. For example, in İzmir Province, Kınık is the name of one of the ilçe (district) centers. There are also many villages. Currently, the total number of various towns and settlements in Turkey carrying the tribal name of Kınık is 28.

=== Settlements bearing the name Kınık ===
Afyonkarahisar Province

- Kınık, Dinar
- Kınık, Sandıklı
- Kınık, Sinanpaşa

Ankara Province

- Kınık, Kalecik
- Kınık, Kazan
- Kınık (Aşağı), Kızılcahamam
- Kınık (Yukarı), Kızılcahamam

Antalya Province

- Kınık, Kaş

Balıkesir Province

- Kınık, Sındırgı

Bilecik Province

- Kınık, Bilecik After the fall of the Seljuk Sultanate of Rum, one of the Oghuz tribe's Kayi tribe bey Ertugrul fought with the Byzantines in the border region of Seljuk empire and the Niceae Empire called Soghut which is now located in the Bilecik province of Turkey. Later his son, Osman marked the beginning of great Ottoman Empire which ruled world for 600 years from 1299 to 1921 and gained peak in 1692.
- Kınık, Pazaryeri

== Qiniq in Turkmenistan ==
Descendants of the Qiniq tribe formed the Soltanyz and Üçurug clans, which are now subdivisions of the Teke tribe of Turkmens in Turkmenistan. The Turkmen clan called the Gabyrdy are believed to descend from Qavurt, who belonged to the Qiniq and was a military commander and a son of Chaghri Beg, the co-ruler of the early Seljuk Empire.
