= Bulak (disambiguation) =

Bulak is a women's nose ring, traditional in Northern India.

Bulak may also refer to:

- Bulak, Kızılcahamam, municipality and district of Kızılcahamam, Ankara Province, Turkey
- Bulak, Merzifon, village in the Merzifon District, Amasya Province, Turkey
- Bulak, Kizhinginsky District, Republic of Buryatia, Russia
- Bulak, Selenginsky District, Republic of Buryatia, Russia
- Bulak, Sındırgı, village in Turkey
- Bulak, Surabaya, subdistrict of Surabaya, Java, Indonesia
- "Bulak" means "source" or "spring" in Turkic and Mongolic languages, and as such it is part of many place names:
- Giray Bulak, Turkish football coach

== See also ==
- Bolak (disambiguation)
