= Sancar (disambiguation) =

Sancar is a Turkish surname.

Sancar may also refer to:

== Places ==
- Sancar, Kahramankazan
- Sancar, Kazan, village in Turkey
- Sancar, Orta, village in Turkey
- Sancar Paşa, İskele, district quarter in Cyprus
- Sancar, Yeşilli

== Other uses ==
- Sancar SİDA, an unmanned combat surface vessel of the Turkish Navy
