= Qiniq =

Qiniq may refer to:

- Qiniq (tribe), a historical Oghuz Turkic tribe
- Qiniq (company), a Canadian communications company
