= Sarayköy (disambiguation) =

Sarayköy can refer to:

- Sarayköy, a town in Turkey
- Sarayköy, Bayat
- Sarayköy, Eldivan
- Sarayköy, Kızılcahamam, a village
- Sarayköy, Yeniçağa, a village
