= Kırköy =

Kırköy may refer to the following settlements in Turkey:

- Kırköy, Kale, a neighbourhood in Denizli Province
- Kırköy, Kızılcahamam, a neighbourhood in Ankara Province
- Kırköy, Muş, a town in Muş Province
- Kırköy, Posof, a village in Ardahan Province
- Kırköy, Uğurludağ, a village in Çorum Province
- Kırköy, Uzunköprü, a village in Edirne Province
- Kırköy, Yayladere, a village in Bingöl Province
