= Bolak =

Bolak or boulak may refer to:

- Bolaq, channel in Kazan, the capital city of Republic of Tatarstan, Russia

== See also ==
- Boulac Corniche (or Boulak Corniche)
- Boulak Bridge (aka Abou El Ela Bridge)
- Boulaq, district of Cairo, Egypt
- Bulak (disambiguation)
