= Demirciören =

Demirciören can refer to:

- Demirciören, Kızılcahamam
- Demirciören, Kurşunlu
