= Emrullah İşler =

Turkish theologian and politician

Emrullah İşler MP Ph.D
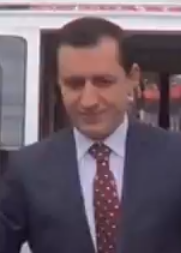

Deputy Prime Minister of Turkey
- In office 25 December 2013 – 29 August 2014
- Prime Minister: Recep Tayyip Erdoğan
- Serving with: Bülent Arınç; Beşir Atalay; Ali Babacan
- Preceded by: Bekir Bozdağ
- Succeeded by: Yalçın Akdoğan

Member of the Grand National Assembly
- Incumbent
- Assumed office 12 June 2011
- Constituency: Ankara (II) (2011, June 2015, Nov 2015, 2018)

Personal details
- Born: 7 January 1960 (age 66) Kuşcuören, Kızılcahamam, Ankara Province, Turkey
- Party: Justice and Development Party (AK Party)
- Children: 3
- Education: Theology, Law; King Saud University; Ankara University
- Occupation: Politician, academic

Emrullah İşler (born 7 January 1960) is a Turkish theologian, university lecturer, and politician. On 25 December 2013, he was appointed as a deputy prime minister in the third cabinet of Prime Minister Recep Tayyip Erdoğan.

== Early life ==
Emrullah İşler was born to Abdullah and Zeliha İşler in the village of Kuşcuören in the Kızılcahamam district of Ankara Province on 7 January 1960.

After receiving a Bachelor's degree in Islamic Science from the Faculty of Education at King Saud University in Riyadh, Saudi Arabia, he completed his education with a Master's degree, and earned later a PhD degree in Tafsir (Interpretation of the Qur'an and Hadith) at the Basic Islamic Science Department of the Institute of Social Science in Ankara University.

He is married and has three children.

== Career ==
=== Academics ===
İşler worked as associate professor for Tafsir at the Faculty of Theology of Cumhuriyet University in Sivas, and then in Arabic language at Gazi University's Faculty of Education in Ankara, where he was later promoted to full professor. He served also as visiting professor at universities in Kazakhstan and Saudi Arabia.

=== Politics ===
He entered politics through the ruling Justice and Development Party (AKP), and was elected into the Grand National Assembly of Turkey in the 2011 general election as an MP from Ankara Province. He was appointed head of the Nigeria-Turkey Interparliamentary Group. İşler served as chief advisor to the prime minister. He was Erdoğan's interpreter for Arabic language and was part of his close circle.

On 26 December 2013, Emrullah İşler assumed office as a deputy prime minister, replacing Bekir Bozdağ during Erdoğan's cabinet reshuffle with ten new names that was announced the day before, on 25 December, following the 2013 corruption scandal in Turkey.

In 2014, İşler claimed that the Islamic State of Iraq and the Levant in Iraq did not amount to torture.

Political offices
Preceded by Bülent Arınç; Bekir Bozdağ; Cemil Çiçek	Deputy Prime Minister of Turkey; 26 December 2013 – present With: Bülent Arınç; Beşir Atalay; Ali Babacan	Incumbent
