= Çalta, Kahramankazan =

Çalta
- Neighbourhood
- Location in Turkey Çalta (Turkey Central Anatolia)
- Coordinates: 40.2472°N 32.5455°E
- Country: Turkey
- Province: Ankara
- District: Kahramankazan
- Population (2022): 78
- Time zone: UTC+3 (TRT)

Çalta is a neighbourhood in the municipality and district of Kahramankazan, Ankara Province, Turkey. Its population is 78 (2022). In 2006 it passed from the Kızılcahamam District to the Kahramankazan District.
