= Kemal Aydın =

Turkish footballer (1934–2019)

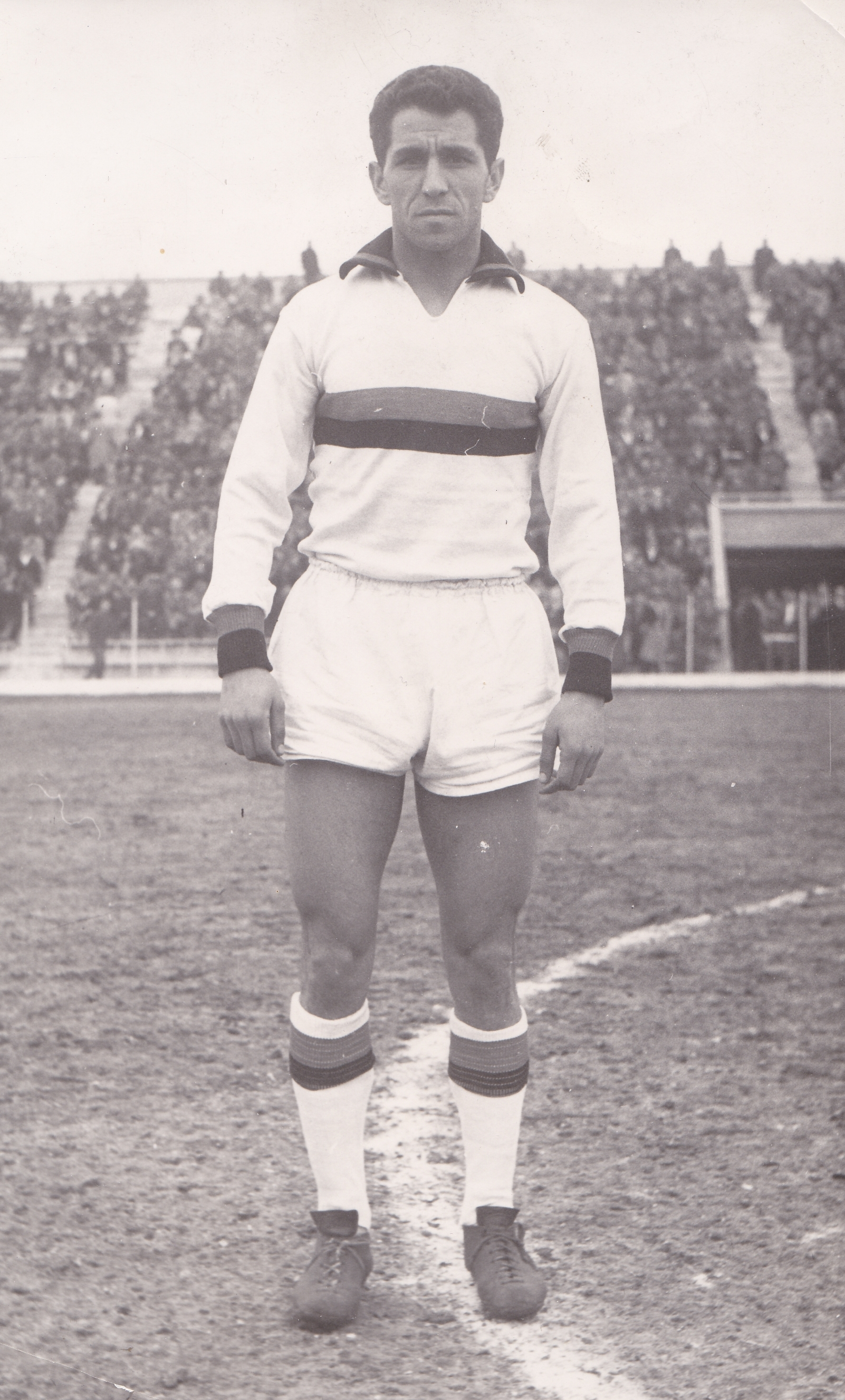

Personal information
- Date of birth: 19 January 1934
- Place of birth: Derekışla, Bala, Ankara, Turkey
- Date of death: 8 January 2019 (aged 84)
- Place of death: Ankara, Turkey
- Height: 1.74 m (5 ft 9 in)
- Position: Defender

Youth career
- 1951–1955: Barbaros Spor Kulübü

Senior career*
Years	Team	Apps	(Gls)
1956–1962	Gençlerbirliği S.K.	20	
- * Club domestic league appearances and goals

Kemal Aydın (19 January 1934 – 8 January 2019) was a Turkish football player. He was nicknamed Kara Kemal, meaning "courageous Kemal".

== Early life ==
He was born in Derekışla village in Bala district of Ankara Province. His father was Hasan Aydın, one of the first butchers of Ankara. He studied in İnönü Primary school, Ankara Gazi Highschool and School Economics of Ankara.

He was married to Özden Aydın and father of two.

== Professional life ==
In 1956, he began serving for Turkish recorder of deeds. But he moved to Ministry of Youth and Sports. He became the dean of the Sports Academy and general coordinator of Turkish Football Federation. He retired in 1985, but continued to serve as a consultant to the minister and as a representative of Turkish Football Federation in European cups. He also served as the chieftain of the Turkey national team during the tournaments in South Korea and Oman.

== Sports life ==
He began his football life in Ankara Barbaros team in 1951. Between 1956 and 1962 he played in Gençlerbirliği S.K. Although he had to quit active sports life after being injured, he became the general captain of PTT Sports in 1967.
