= Sancar =

Sancar (or Sançar) is a Turkish surname. People with the surname include:

- Aziz Sancar (born 1946), Turkish-US biochemist, molecular biologist, and Nobel Prize laureate
- Mithat Sancar (born 1963), Turkish law scholar, columnist, and politician
- Nejdet Sançar (1910–1975), Turkish literature teacher
- Semih Sancar (1911–1984), Turkish army general

== See also ==
- Sancar (disambiguation)
