= Yeşilköy, Kızılcahamam =

Yeşilköy
- Neighbourhood
- Country: Turkey
- Province: Ankara
- District: Kızılcahamam
- Population (2022): 83
- Time zone: UTC+3 (TRT)

Yeşilköy is a neighbourhood in the municipality and district of Kızılcahamam, Ankara Province, Turkey. Its population is 83 (2022).
