= Uğurlu, Kızılcahamam =

Uğurlu
- Neighbourhood
- Location in Turkey Uğurlu (Turkey Central Anatolia)
- Coordinates: 40.3612°N 32.6689°E
- Country: Turkey
- Province: Ankara
- District: Kızılcahamam
- Population (2022): 122
- Time zone: UTC+3 (TRT)

Uğurlu is a neighbourhood in the municipality and district of Kızılcahamam, Ankara Province, Turkey. Its population is 122 (2022).
