= Kızılcaören, Kızılcahamam =

Kızılcaören
- Neighbourhood
- Location in Turkey Kızılcaören (Turkey Central Anatolia)
- Coordinates: 40°30′28″N 32°37′32″E
- Country: Turkey
- Province: Ankara
- District: Kızılcahamam
- Population (2022): 256
- Time zone: UTC+3 (TRT)

Kızılcaören is a neighbourhood in the municipality and district of Kızılcahamam, Ankara Province, Turkey. Its population is 256 (2022).
