= Boulak Bridge =

Bridge in Cairo, Egypt

The Boulak Bridge (also called the Boulac Bridge, Abou El Ela Bridge, Abou al-Ela Bridge) was a bridge that crossed the Nile River in Cairo, Egypt. It linked Gezira Island to Bulaq.

== History ==
The bridge was designed and built between 1908 and 1912 by William Scherzer. It had a rolling and locking mechanism used for opening it to river traffic and was 274.5 metres long and 20 meters wide. The Boulak Bridge was demolished in 1998. The demolition was carried out by the Arab Contractors company at a cost of 4 million Egyptian pounds.
