= Doymuşören, Kızılcahamam =

Doymuşören
- Neighbourhood
- Location in Turkey Doymuşören (Turkey Central Anatolia)
- Coordinates: 40°23′N 32°33′E
- Country: Turkey
- Province: Ankara
- District: Kızılcahamam
- Population (2022): 25
- Time zone: UTC+3 (TRT)

Doymuşören is a neighbourhood in the municipality and district of Kızılcahamam, Ankara Province, Turkey. Its population is 25 (2022).
