= Günbaşı, Kahramankazan =

Günbaşı
- Neighbourhood
- Location in Turkey Günbaşı (Turkey Central Anatolia)
- Coordinates: 40.2150°N 32.7124°E
- Country: Turkey
- Province: Ankara
- District: Kahramankazan
- Population (2024): 114
- Time zone: UTC+3 (TRT)

Günbaşı is a neighbourhood in the municipality and district of Kahramankazan, Ankara Province, Turkey. Its population was 114 as of 2024, and it sits at an altitude of 888 metres.
