= İyceler, Kızılcahamam =

İyceler
- Neighbourhood
- Location in Turkey İyceler (Turkey Central Anatolia)
- Coordinates: 40°39′45″N 32°38′58″E
- Country: Turkey
- Province: Ankara
- District: Kızılcahamam
- Population (2022): 129
- Time zone: UTC+3 (TRT)

İyceler (also: Iğciler or İğceler) is a neighbourhood in the municipality and district of Kızılcahamam, Ankara Province, Turkey. Its population is 129 (2022).
