= Süleler, Kızılcahamam =

Süleler
- Neighbourhood
- Location in Turkey Süleler (Turkey Central Anatolia)
- Coordinates: 40.6526°N 32.5928°E
- Country: Turkey
- Province: Ankara
- District: Kızılcahamam
- Population (2022): 216
- Time zone: UTC+3 (TRT)

Süleler is a neighbourhood in the municipality and district of Kızılcahamam, Ankara Province, Turkey. Its population is 216 (2022).
