= Karaağaç, Kızılcahamam =

Karaağaç
- Neighbourhood
- Location in Turkey Karaağaç (Turkey Central Anatolia)
- Coordinates: 40.6225°N 32.5885°E
- Country: Turkey
- Province: Ankara
- District: Kızılcahamam
- Population (2022): 111
- Time zone: UTC+3 (TRT)

Karaağaç is a neighbourhood in the municipality and district of Kızılcahamam, Ankara Province, Turkey. Its population is 111 (2022).
