= Bademli, Kızılcahamam =

Bademli
- Neighbourhood
- Location in Turkey Bademli (Turkey Central Anatolia)
- Coordinates: 40.2889°N 32.3566°E
- Country: Turkey
- Province: Ankara
- District: Kızılcahamam
- Population (2022): 51
- Time zone: UTC+3 (TRT)

Bademli is a neighbourhood in the municipality and district of Kızılcahamam, Ankara Province, Turkey. Its population is 51 (2022).
