= Olucak, Kızılcahamam =

Olucak
- Neighbourhood
- Location in Turkey Olucak (Turkey Central Anatolia)
- Coordinates: 40.4824°N 32.8271°E
- Country: Turkey
- Province: Ankara
- District: Kızılcahamam
- Population (2022): 84
- Time zone: UTC+3 (TRT)

Olucak is a neighbourhood in the municipality and district of Kızılcahamam, Ankara Province, Turkey. Its population is 84 (2022).
