= Güvenç, Kahramankazan =

Güvenç
- Neighbourhood
- Location in Turkey Güvenç (Turkey Central Anatolia)
- Coordinates: 40.1445°N 32.7240°E
- Country: Turkey
- Province: Ankara
- District: Kahramankazan
- Population (2022): 265
- Time zone: UTC+3 (TRT)

Güvenç is a neighbourhood in the municipality and district of Kahramankazan, Ankara Province, Turkey. Its population is 265 (2022).
