= Akçakese, Kızılcahamam =

Akçakese
- Neighbourhood
- Location in Turkey Akçakese (Turkey Central Anatolia)
- Coordinates: 40.4792°N 32.7147°E
- Country: Turkey
- Province: Ankara
- District: Kızılcahamam
- Population (2022): 31
- Time zone: UTC+3 (TRT)

Akçakese is a neighbourhood in the municipality and district of Kızılcahamam, Ankara Province, Turkey. Its population is 31 (2022).
