= Saray, Kahramankazan =

Sarayköy
- Neighbourhood
- Location in Turkey Sarayköy (Turkey Central Anatolia)
- Coordinates: 40.0559°N 32.6315°E
- Country: Turkey
- Province: Ankara
- District: Kahramankazan
- Population (2022): 735
- Time zone: UTC+3 (TRT)

Sarayköy is a neighbourhood in the municipality and district of Kahramankazan, Ankara Province, Turkey. Its population is 735 (2022).
