= Sazak, Kızılcahamam =

Sazak
- Neighbourhood
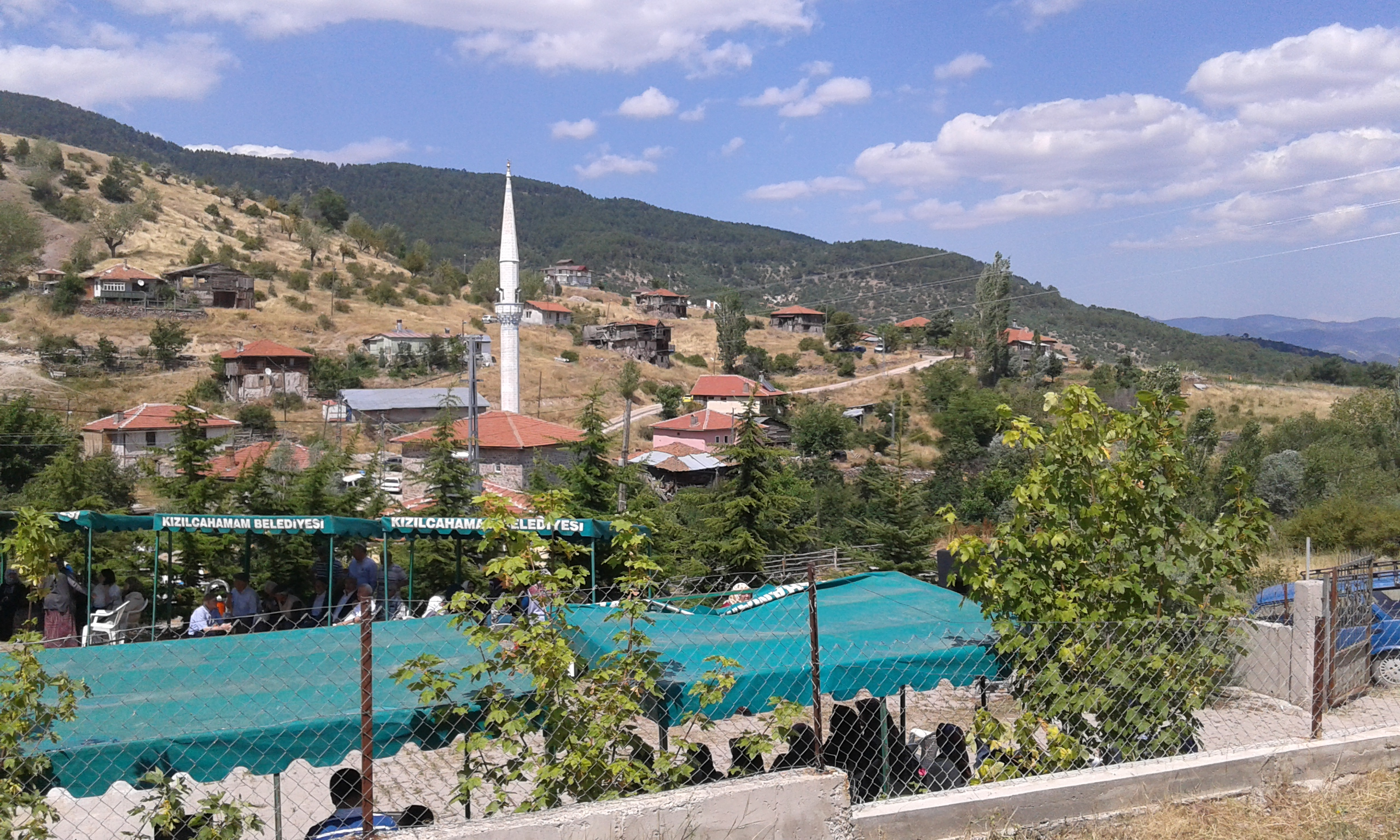

- Location within Turkey Location within Turkey Central Anatolia
- Coordinates: 40.4100°N 32.6006°E
- Country: Turkey
- Province: Ankara
- District: Kızılcahamam
- Population (2022): 150
- Time zone: UTC+3 (TRT)

Sazak is a neighbourhood in the municipality and district of Kızılcahamam, Ankara Province, Turkey. Its population is 150 (2022).
