= Saraycık, Kızılcahamam =

Saraycık
- Neighbourhood
- Location in Turkey Saraycık (Turkey Central Anatolia)
- Coordinates: 40°24′21″N 32°33′57″E
- Country: Turkey
- Province: Ankara
- District: Kızılcahamam
- Population (2022): 52
- Time zone: UTC+3 (TRT)

Saraycık is a neighbourhood in the municipality and district of Kızılcahamam, Ankara Province, Turkey. Its population is 52 (2022).
