= Yıldırımhacılar, Kızılcahamam =

Yıldırımhacılar
- Neighbourhood
- Location in Turkey Yıldırımhacılar (Turkey Central Anatolia)
- Coordinates: 40°30′N 32°48′E
- Country: Turkey
- Province: Ankara
- District: Kızılcahamam
- Population (2022): 93
- Time zone: UTC+3 (TRT)

Yıldırımhacılar is a neighbourhood in the municipality and district of Kızılcahamam, Ankara Province, Turkey. Its population is 93 (2022).
