= Çırpan, Kızılcahamam =

Çırpan
- Neighbourhood
- Location in Turkey Çırpan (Turkey Central Anatolia)
- Coordinates: 40.2580°N 32.5479°E
- Country: Turkey
- Province: Ankara
- District: Kızılcahamam
- Population (2022): 67
- Time zone: UTC+3 (TRT)

Çırpan is a neighbourhood in the municipality and district of Kızılcahamam, Ankara Province, Turkey. Its population is 67 (2022).
