= Kılıçlar, Kahramankazan =

Kılıçlar
- Neighbourhood
- Location in Turkey Kılıçlar (Turkey Central Anatolia)
- Coordinates: 40.1730°N 32.7694°E
- Country: Turkey
- Province: Ankara
- District: Kahramankazan
- Population (2022): 215
- Time zone: UTC+3 (TRT)

Kılıçlar is a neighbourhood in the municipality and district of Kahramankazan, Ankara Province, Turkey. Its population is 215 (2022).
