= Bitik, Kahramankazan =

Bitik
- Neighbourhood
- Location in Turkey Bitik (Turkey Central Anatolia)
- Coordinates: 40°07′N 32°37′E
- Country: Turkey
- Province: Ankara
- District: Kahramankazan
- Population (2022): 200
- Time zone: UTC+3 (TRT)

Bitik is a neighbourhood in the municipality and district of Kahramankazan, Ankara Province, Turkey. Its population is 200 (2022).

== Geography ==
It is 36 km away from Ankara and 12 km away from Kahramankazan district.
