= İnceğiz, Kahramankazan =

İnceğiz
- Neighbourhood
- Location in Turkey İnceğiz (Turkey Central Anatolia)
- Coordinates: 40°15′50″N 32°46′26″E
- Country: Turkey
- Province: Ankara
- District: Kahramankazan
- Population (2022): 45
- Time zone: UTC+3 (TRT)

İnceğiz is a neighbourhood in the municipality and district of Kahramankazan, Ankara Province, Turkey. Its population is 45 (2022).

== History ==
It is said that a dynasty called İnce Beyler lived on the hillside to the north of the village, in the place called Hamam Yıkık, and that the name of the village came from here. The graves of this dynasty are still in the garden of the village school. Ince Beyler dynasty was eliminated by the enemies. Only one girl survived. She was taken by her relatives in the village of Çubuğut Yiğitli (İbek) and remained there. Some of the important dynasties in the village are as follows; Ali Kethüdaoğulları (Ersoy), Terlemezoğulları (Şimşek), Çanlıaligil (Yavuz), Kocaihtiyarlar (Ozcan), Corporals (Yılmaz), Tuloğulları (Gül), Hacigiller (Öztürk), Imams (Tatar).

The village of İnceğiz, formerly known as “İncüğez”, was one of the villages of Hâssa-yi Mir-livâ (Alaybeyi hassı) in the Murtazaabad district in 1530. Approximately 153 people, including 13 mucerred (single men), lived in the campus, which consisted of 28 households. The annual revenue of İnceğüz village, which belongs to the Ankara Regiment, was around 3400 akce. Some villages in the region were completely abandoned due to the Celali raids, diseases and disasters; The population of İnceğüz village has also decreased significantly.

In 1844, Suleyman the son of Akman, Ahmed the son of Akman, Osman son of Akman and Ali the son of Hacı from Yenimahalle-Dodurga Village settled in the village of İnceğiz. In 1845, the number of households in the campus decreased to three. During these dates, the son of Süleyman Ömer (farmer), the son of Tolu Hüseyin (farmer) and the son of Ali Kethüda Ali (farmer) lived in the village.

== Economy ==
Village livelihood is agriculture and animal husbandry. Since there is no irrigation facility, products such as barley, wheat, melons, chickpeas and vetch are planted.
