= Pazar, Kızılcahamam =

Pazar
- Neighbourhood
- Location in Turkey Pazar (Turkey Central Anatolia)
- Coordinates: 40.3303°N 32.7482°E
- Country: Turkey
- Province: Ankara
- District: Kızılcahamam
- Population (2022): 235
- Time zone: UTC+3 (TRT)

Pazar is a neighbourhood in the municipality and district of Kızılcahamam, Ankara Province, Turkey. Its population is 235 (2022).
