= Aydın, Kahramankazan =

Aydın
- Neighbourhood
- Location in Turkey Aydın (Turkey Central Anatolia)
- Coordinates: 40.1630°N 32.6701°E
- Country: Turkey
- Province: Ankara
- District: Kahramankazan
- Population (2022): 204
- Time zone: UTC+3 (TRT)

Aydın is a neighbourhood in the municipality and district of Kahramankazan, Ankara Province, Turkey. Its population is 204 (2022).
