= Yassıören, Kahramankazan =

Yassıören
- Neighbourhood
- Location in Turkey Yassıören (Turkey Central Anatolia)
- Coordinates: 40.2286°N 32.6467°E
- Country: Turkey
- Province: Ankara
- District: Kahramankazan
- Population (2022): 146
- Time zone: UTC+3 (TRT)

Yassıören is a neighbourhood in the municipality and district of Kahramankazan, Ankara Province, Turkey. Its population is 146 (2022).
