= Akdoğan, Kızılcahamam =

Akdoğan
- Neighbourhood
- Location in Turkey Akdoğan (Turkey Central Anatolia)
- Coordinates: 40°23′36″N 32°40′42″E
- Country: Turkey
- Province: Ankara
- District: Kızılcahamam
- Population (2022): 154
- Time zone: UTC+3 (TRT)

Akdoğan is a neighbourhood in the municipality and district of Kızılcahamam, Ankara Province, Turkey. Its population is 154 (2022).

Akdoğan is the Turkish word for gyrfalcon. In the old times, some Turkish Oghuz people came to here and discovered a place to establish their village. At the same time, their white falcon was flying in this place, so they decided to settle there and named it Akdoğan after their bird. The villagers' most important meal tickets are agriculture and animal selling. Generally these animals are goats, sheep and cows. Climate is general Anatolian inland climate but rain is more than normal. In the village there are a post office, a mosque. Akdoğan is 11 km far to Kızılcahamam and 70 km far to Ankara. Buses which come from Old Etlik Garages pass through the village. Akdoğan has a festival which is started in 2007. Its name is Ak-Der Fest.
