= Turnalı, Kızılcahamam =

Turnalı
- Neighbourhood
- Location in Turkey Turnalı (Turkey Central Anatolia)
- Coordinates: 40.2332°N 32.3600°E
- Country: Turkey
- Province: Ankara
- District: Kızılcahamam
- Population (2022): 16
- Time zone: UTC+3 (TRT)

Turnalı is a neighbourhood in the municipality and district of Kızılcahamam, Ankara Province, Turkey. Its population is 16 (2022).
