= Kahramankazan =

- District and municipality
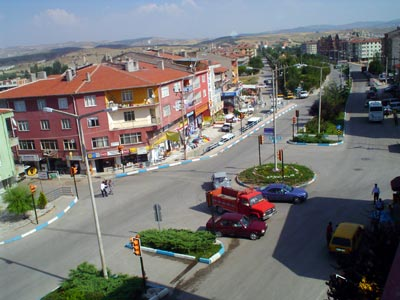

- Logo

- Map showing Kahramankazan District in Ankara Province

- Location within Turkey Location within Turkey Central Anatolia
- Coordinates: 40°12′23″N 32°40′54″E
- Country: Turkey
- Province: Ankara

Government
  - Mayor: Selim Çırpanoğlu (CHP)
- Area: 547 km^{2} (211 sq mi)
- Elevation: 892 m (2,927 ft)
- Population (2022): 59,123
  - Density: 108/km^{2} (280/sq mi)
- Time zone: UTC+3 (TRT)
- Postal code: 06980
- Area code: 0312
- Website: www.kahramankazan.bel.tr

Kahramankazan (before 2016: Kazan) is a municipality and district of Ankara Province, Turkey. Its area is 547 km^{2}, and its population is 59,123 (2022). It lies in the plain of Akıncı to the north west of the city of Ankara. Its elevation is 892 m (2,927 ft).

== History ==
Archaeological research reveals the plain has a long past, going back to prehistoric times, and findings during the excavation of the Bitik Höyük mound date back to the copper age.

== Kahramankazan today ==
Today the area is a popular weekend retreat for the people of Ankara. Kahramankazan is a busy small town. Industry in the city includes a brewery and a cement factory.

Opened in November 2011, the Turkish Satellite Assembly, Integration and Test Center (UMET), is situated in the Fethiye neighborhood of the city.

A large trona ore deposit, which lays 600 m (2,000 ft) underground, is mined and processed by Kazan Soda Elektrik of Ciner Holding in the city.

The town was renamed Kahramankazan (Hero Kazan) in 2016 due to the role of local residents in opposing the 2016 Turkish coup d'état attempt.

=== 2024 terrorist attack ===
On October 23, 2024, an explosion happened at the headquarters of the Turkish Aerospace Industries, which was located in Kahramankazan. Many were killed and wounded, and some are known as martyrs. The explosion was known as a terrorist attack.

== Composition ==
There are 48 neighbourhoods in Kahramankazan District:

- Ahi
- Akçaören
- Akıncı
- Alpagut
- Aşağıkaraören
- Atatürk
- Aydın
- Bitik
- Çalta
- Ciğir
- Çimşit
- Dağyaka
- Dutözü
- Emirgazi
- Fatih
- Fethiye
- Günbaşı
- Güvenç
- İçören
- İmrendi
- İnceğiz
- İne
- İymir
- Kanuni Sultan Süleyman
- Karalar
- Kayı
- Kılıçlar
- Kınık
- Kışla
- Kumpınar
- Örencik
- Orhaniye
- Peçenek
- Sancar
- Saraç
- Saray
- Sarıayak
- Sarılar
- Satıkadın
- Soğucak
- Tekke
- Uçarı
- Yakupderviş
- Yassıören
- Yavuz Sultan Selim
- Yayalar
- Yazıbeyli
- Yıldırımbeyazıt
