= Yukarıkaraören, Kızılcahamam =

Yukarıkaraören
- Neighbourhood
- Location in Turkey Yukarıkaraören (Turkey Central Anatolia)
- Coordinates: 40°22′N 32°44′E
- Country: Turkey
- Province: Ankara
- District: Kızılcahamam
- Population (2022): 189
- Time zone: UTC+3 (TRT)

Yukarıkaraören is a neighbourhood in the municipality and district of Kızılcahamam, Ankara Province, Turkey. Its population is 189 (2022).
