= Kasımlar, Kızılcahamam =

Kasımlar
- Neighbourhood
- Location in Turkey Kasımlar (Turkey Central Anatolia)
- Coordinates: 40.6617°N 32.6701°E
- Country: Turkey
- Province: Ankara
- District: Kızılcahamam
- Population (2022): 93
- Time zone: UTC+3 (TRT)

Kasımlar is a neighbourhood in the municipality and district of Kızılcahamam, Ankara Province, Turkey. Its population is 93 (2022).
