= Binkoz, Kızılcahamam =

Binkoz
- Neighbourhood
- Location in Turkey Binkoz (Turkey Central Anatolia)
- Coordinates: 40.3233°N 32.5737°E
- Country: Turkey
- Province: Ankara
- District: Kızılcahamam
- Population (2022): 55
- Time zone: UTC+3 (TRT)

Binkoz is a neighbourhood in the municipality and district of Kızılcahamam, Ankara Province, Turkey. Its population is 55 (2022).
