= Yakupderviş, Kahramankazan =

Yakupderviş
- Neighbourhood
- Location in Turkey Yakupderviş (Turkey Central Anatolia)
- Coordinates: 40°16′N 32°49′E
- Country: Turkey
- Province: Ankara
- District: Kahramankazan
- Population (2022): 102
- Time zone: UTC+3 (TRT)

Yakupderviş is a neighbourhood in the municipality and district of Kahramankazan, Ankara Province, Turkey. Its population is 102 (2022).
