= Bulak, Selenginsky District, Republic of Buryatia =

Bulak Булак
- Ulus
- Location within Republic of Buryatia Location within Russia
- Coordinates: 51°18′N 106°34′E
- Country: Russia
- Region: Republic of Buryatia
- District: Selenginsky District
- Time zone: UTC+8:00

Bulak (Russian: Булак; Buryat: Булаг, Bulag) is a rural locality (an ulus) in Selenginsky District, Republic of Buryatia, Russia. The population was 21 as of 2010.

== Geography ==
Bulak is located 7 km northeast of Gusinoozyorsk (the district's administrative centre) by road. Gusinoozyorsk is the nearest rural locality.
