= Bezcikuzören, Kızılcahamam =

Bezcikuzören
- Neighbourhood
- Location in Turkey Bezcikuzören (Turkey Central Anatolia)
- Coordinates: 40°18′N 32°31′E
- Country: Turkey
- Province: Ankara
- District: Kızılcahamam
- Population (2022): 39
- Time zone: UTC+3 (TRT)

Bezcikuzören is a neighbourhood in the municipality and district of Kızılcahamam, Ankara Province, Turkey. Its population is 39 (2022).
