= Otacı, Kızılcahamam =

Otacı
- Neighbourhood
- Location in Turkey Otacı (Turkey Central Anatolia)
- Coordinates: 40°22′N 32°50′E
- Country: Turkey
- Province: Ankara
- District: Kızılcahamam
- Population (2022): 232
- Time zone: UTC+3 (TRT)

Otacı is a neighbourhood in the municipality and district of Kızılcahamam, Ankara Province, Turkey. Its population is 232 (2022).
