= Eğerlialören, Kızılcahamam =

Eğerlialören
- Neighbourhood
- Location in Turkey Eğerlialören (Turkey Central Anatolia)
- Coordinates: 40°35′N 32°44′E
- Country: Turkey
- Province: Ankara
- District: Kızılcahamam
- Population (2022): 216
- Time zone: UTC+3 (TRT)

Eğerlialören is a neighbourhood in the municipality and district of Kızılcahamam, Ankara Province, Turkey, with a population is 216 (2022).
