= Berçinçatak, Kızılcahamam =

Berçinçatak
- Neighbourhood
- Location in Turkey Berçinçatak (Turkey Central Anatolia)
- Coordinates: 40°40′N 32°32′E
- Country: Turkey
- Province: Ankara
- District: Kızılcahamam
- Population (2022): 202
- Time zone: UTC+3 (TRT)

Berçinçatak is a neighbourhood in the municipality and district of Kızılcahamam, Ankara Province, Turkey. Its population is 202 (2022).
