= Gölköy, Kızılcahamam =

Gölköy
- Neighbourhood
- Country: Turkey
- Province: Ankara
- District: Kızılcahamam
- Population (2022): 11
- Time zone: UTC+3 (TRT)

Gölköy (also: Göl) is a neighbourhood in the municipality and district of Kızılcahamam, Ankara Province, Turkey. Its population is 11 (2022).
