= İmrendi, Kahramankazan =

İmrendi
- Neighbourhood
- Location in Turkey İmrendi (Turkey Central Anatolia)
- Coordinates: 40°08′N 32°40′E
- Country: Turkey
- Province: Ankara
- District: Kahramankazan
- Population (2022): 832
- Time zone: UTC+3 (TRT)

İmrendi is a neighbourhood in the municipality and district of Kahramankazan, Ankara Province, Turkey. Its population is 832 (2022).
