= Kuşcuören, Kızılcahamam =

Kuşcuören
- Neighbourhood
- Location in Turkey Kuşcuören (Turkey Central Anatolia)
- Coordinates: 40.3667°N 32.4721°E
- Country: Turkey
- Province: Ankara
- District: Kızılcahamam
- Population (2022): 108
- Time zone: UTC+3 (TRT)

Kuşcuören is a neighbourhood in the municipality and district of Kızılcahamam, Ankara Province, Turkey. Its population is 108 (2022).

== Notable natives ==
- Emrullah İşler (born 1960), academic for theology and Deputy Prime Minister (2013- )
