= Alpagut, Kahramankazan =

Alpagut
- Neighbourhood
- Location in Turkey Alpagut (Turkey Central Anatolia)
- Coordinates: 40.2116°N 32.7238°E
- Country: Turkey
- Province: Ankara
- District: Kahramankazan
- Population (2022): 104
- Time zone: UTC+3 (TRT)

Alpagut is a neighbourhood in the municipality and district of Kahramankazan, Ankara Province, Turkey. Its population is 104 (2022).
