= Çeltikçi, Kızılcahamam =

Çeltikçi
- Neighbourhood
- Location in Turkey Çeltikçi (Turkey Central Anatolia)
- Coordinates: 40°19′N 32°27′E
- Country: Turkey
- Province: Ankara
- District: Kızılcahamam
- Elevation: 850 m (2,790 ft)
- Population (2022): 291
- Time zone: UTC+3 (TRT)
- Postal code: 06890
- Area code: 0312

Çeltikçi is a neighbourhood in the municipality and district of Kızılcahamam, Ankara Province, Turkey. Its population is 291 (2022). Before the 2013 reorganisation, it was a town (belde). It is situated to the south of Çamlıdere Dam reservoir and to the south west of Kızılcahamam. The earliest references to Çeltikçi are of 1691 when the Ottoman government forced a small Turkmen tribe to settle. But later other people like Circassians from the Caucasus, Turks from Veliko Tarnovo (modern Bulgaria), Circassians and Tatars from Dobruja (modern Romania) were also settled in Çeltikçi.
