= Üyücek, Kızılcahamam =

Üyücek
- Neighbourhood

- Location within Turkey Location within Turkey Central Anatolia
- Coordinates: 40.6263°N 32.5648°E
- Country: Turkey
- Province: Ankara
- District: Kızılcahamam
- Population (2022): 25
- Time zone: UTC+3 (TRT)

Üyücek is a neighbourhood in the municipality and district of Kızılcahamam, Ankara Province, Turkey. Its population is 25 (2022).
