= Çukurca, Kızılcahamam =

Çukurca
- Neighbourhood
- Location in Turkey Çukurca (Turkey Central Anatolia)
- Coordinates: 40.5034°N 32.7521°E
- Country: Turkey
- Province: Ankara
- District: Kızılcahamam
- Population (2022): 38
- Time zone: UTC+3 (TRT)

Çukurca is a neighbourhood in the municipality and district of Kızılcahamam, Ankara Province, Turkey. Its population is 38 (2022).
