= Sarılar, Kahramankazan =

Sarılar
- Neighbourhood
- Location in Turkey Sarılar (Turkey Central Anatolia)
- Coordinates: 40.2305°N 32.5788°E
- Country: Turkey
- Province: Ankara
- District: Kahramankazan
- Population (2022): 104
- Time zone: UTC+3 (TRT)

Sarılar is a neighbourhood in the municipality and district of Kahramankazan, Ankara Province, Turkey. Its population is 104 (2022).
