= Pazar Başören, Kızılcahamam =

Pazar Başören
- Neighbourhood
- Country: Turkey
- Province: Ankara
- District: Kızılcahamam
- Population (2022): 50
- Time zone: UTC+3 (TRT)

Pazar Başören is a neighbourhood in the municipality and district of Kızılcahamam, Ankara Province, Turkey. Its population is 50 (2022).
