= Kalemler, Kızılcahamam =

Kalemler
- Neighbourhood
- Location in Turkey Kalemler (Turkey Central Anatolia)
- Coordinates: 40.3664°N 32.4140°E
- Country: Turkey
- Province: Ankara
- District: Kızılcahamam
- Population (2022): 56
- Time zone: UTC+3 (TRT)

Kalemler is a neighbourhood in the municipality and district of Kızılcahamam, Ankara Province, Turkey. Its population is 56 (2022).
