= Hıdırlar, Kızılcahamam =

Hıdırlar
- Neighbourhood
- Location in Turkey Hıdırlar (Turkey Central Anatolia)
- Coordinates: 40.6682°N 32.6535°E
- Country: Turkey
- Province: Ankara
- District: Kızılcahamam
- Population (2022): 120
- Time zone: UTC+3 (TRT)

Hıdırlar is a neighbourhood in the municipality and district of Kızılcahamam, Ankara Province, Turkey. Its population is 120 (2022).
