= Yukarıhüyük, Kızılcahamam =

Yukarıhüyük
- Neighbourhood
- Location in Turkey Yukarıhüyük (Turkey Central Anatolia)
- Coordinates: 40.3556°N 32.3430°E
- Country: Turkey
- Province: Ankara
- District: Kızılcahamam
- Population (2022): 25
- Time zone: UTC+3 (TRT)

Yukarıhüyük is a neighbourhood in the municipality and district of Kızılcahamam, Ankara Province, Turkey. Its population is 25 (2022).
