= Balcılar, Kızılcahamam =

Balcılar
- Neighbourhood
- Location in Turkey Balcılar (Turkey Central Anatolia)
- Coordinates: 40.4178°N 32.7928°E
- Country: Turkey
- Province: Ankara
- District: Kızılcahamam
- Population (2022): 96
- Time zone: UTC+3 (TRT)

Balcılar is a neighbourhood in the municipality and district of Kızılcahamam, Ankara Province, Turkey. Its population is 96 (2022).
