= Yukarıkese, Kızılcahamam =

Yukarıkese
- Neighbourhood
- Location in Turkey Yukarıkese (Turkey Central Anatolia)
- Coordinates: 40°39′N 32°41′E
- Country: Turkey
- Province: Ankara
- District: Kızılcahamam
- Population (2022): 231
- Time zone: UTC+3 (TRT)

Yukarıkese is a neighbourhood in the municipality and district of Kızılcahamam, Ankara Province, Turkey. Its population is 231 (2022).
