= Ahi, Kahramankazan =

Ahi
- Neighbourhood
- Location in Turkey Ahi (Turkey Central Anatolia)
- Coordinates: 40.2134°N 32.7691°E
- Country: Turkey
- Province: Ankara
- District: Kahramankazan
- Population (2022): 152
- Time zone: UTC+3 (TRT)

Ahi is a neighbourhood in the municipality and district of Kahramankazan, Ankara Province, Turkey. Its population is 152 (2022).
