= Bayır, Kızılcahamam =

Bayır
- Neighbourhood
- Location in Turkey Bayır (Turkey Central Anatolia)
- Coordinates: 40.4694°N 32.7406°E
- Country: Turkey
- Province: Ankara
- District: Kızılcahamam
- Population (2022): 123
- Time zone: UTC+3 (TRT)

Bayır is a neighbourhood in the municipality and district of Kızılcahamam, Ankara Province, Turkey. Its population is 123 (2022).
