= Yukarıada, Kızılcahamam =

Yukarıada
- Neighbourhood
- Location in Turkey Yukarıada (Turkey Central Anatolia)
- Coordinates: 40°22′17″N 32°23′17″E
- Country: Turkey
- Province: Ankara
- District: Kızılcahamam
- Population (2022): 48
- Time zone: UTC+3 (TRT)

Yukarıada (also: Adaköy) is a neighbourhood in the municipality and district of Kızılcahamam, Ankara Province, Turkey. Its population is 48 (2022).
