= İğdir, Kızılcahamam =

İğdir
- Neighbourhood
- Location in Turkey İğdir (Turkey Central Anatolia)
- Coordinates: 40.3133°N 32.6794°E
- Country: Turkey
- Province: Ankara
- District: Kızılcahamam
- Population (2022): 88
- Time zone: UTC+3 (TRT)

İğdir is a neighbourhood in the municipality and district of Kızılcahamam, Ankara Province, Turkey. Its population is 88 (2022).
