= Karacaören, Kızılcahamam =

Karacaören
- Neighbourhood
- Location in Turkey Karacaören (Turkey Central Anatolia)
- Coordinates: 40.4233°N 32.5941°E
- Country: Turkey
- Province: Ankara
- District: Kızılcahamam
- Population (2022): 104
- Time zone: UTC+3 (TRT)

Karacaören is a neighbourhood in the municipality and district of Kızılcahamam, Ankara Province, Turkey. Its population is 104 (2022).
