= İne, Kahramankazan =

İne
- Neighbourhood
- Location in Turkey İne (Turkey Central Anatolia)
- Coordinates: 40°12′N 32°34′E
- Country: Turkey
- Province: Ankara
- District: Kahramankazan
- Population (2022): 61
- Time zone: UTC+3 (TRT)

İne is a neighbourhood in the municipality and district of Kahramankazan, Ankara Province, Turkey. Its population is 61 (2022).
