= İçören, Kahramankazan =

İçören
- Neighbourhood
- Location in Turkey İçören (Turkey Central Anatolia)
- Coordinates: 40.2300°N 32.7373°E
- Country: Turkey
- Province: Ankara
- District: Kahramankazan
- Population (2022): 246
- Time zone: UTC+3 (TRT)

İçören is a neighbourhood in the municipality and district of Kahramankazan, Ankara Province, Turkey. Its population is 246 (2022).
