= Esenler, Kızılcahamam =

Esenler
- Neighbourhood
- Location in Turkey Esenler (Turkey Central Anatolia)
- Coordinates: 40.3258°N 32.6397°E
- Country: Turkey
- Province: Ankara
- District: Kızılcahamam
- Population (2022): 43
- Time zone: UTC+3 (TRT)

Esenler is a neighbourhood in the municipality and district of Kızılcahamam, Ankara Province, Turkey. Its population is 43 (2022).
