= Kızılcaköy, Kızılcahamam =

Kızılcaköy
- Neighbourhood
- Location in Turkey Kızılcaköy (Turkey Central Anatolia)
- Coordinates: 40.3738°N 32.6092°E
- Country: Turkey
- Province: Ankara
- District: Kızılcahamam
- Population (2022): 53
- Time zone: UTC+3 (TRT)

Kızılcaköy is a neighbourhood in the municipality and district of Kızılcahamam, Ankara Province, Turkey. Its population is 53 (2022).
