= Üçbaş, Kızılcahamam =

Üçbaş
- Neighbourhood
- Location in Turkey Üçbaş (Turkey Central Anatolia)
- Coordinates: 40.4040°N 32.6817°E
- Country: Turkey
- Province: Ankara
- District: Kızılcahamam
- Population (2022): 151
- Time zone: UTC+3 (TRT)

Üçbaş is a neighbourhood in the municipality and district of Kızılcahamam, Ankara Province, Turkey. Its population is 151 (2022).
