= Kavaközü, Kızılcahamam =

Kavaközü
- Neighbourhood
- Location in Turkey Kavaközü (Turkey Central Anatolia)
- Coordinates: 40.6319°N 32.6515°E
- Country: Turkey
- Province: Ankara
- District: Kızılcahamam
- Population (2022): 200
- Time zone: UTC+3 (TRT)

Kavaközü is a neighbourhood in the municipality and district of Kızılcahamam, Ankara Province, Turkey. Its population is 200 (2022).
