= Kışlak, Kızılcahamam =

Kışlak
- Neighbourhood
- Location in Turkey Kışlak (Turkey Central Anatolia)
- Coordinates: 40.2954°N 32.3807°E
- Country: Turkey
- Province: Ankara
- District: Kızılcahamam
- Population (2022): 51
- Time zone: UTC+3 (TRT)

Kışlak is a neighbourhood in the municipality and district of Kızılcahamam, Ankara Province, Turkey. Its population is 51 (2022).
