= Berçinyayalar, Kızılcahamam =

Berçinyayalar
- Neighbourhood
- Location in Turkey Berçinyayalar (Turkey Central Anatolia)
- Coordinates: 40.6407°N 32.5035°E
- Country: Turkey
- Province: Ankara
- District: Kızılcahamam
- Population (2022): 110
- Time zone: UTC+3 (TRT)

Berçinyayalar is a neighbourhood in the municipality and district of Kızılcahamam, Ankara Province, Turkey. Its population is 110 (2022).
