= Dereneci, Kızılcahamam =

Dereneci
- Neighbourhood
- Location in Turkey Dereneci (Turkey Central Anatolia)
- Coordinates: 40°36′38″N 32°32′34″E
- Country: Turkey
- Province: Ankara
- District: Kızılcahamam
- Population (2022): 151
- Time zone: UTC+3 (TRT)

Dereneci is a neighbourhood in the municipality and district of Kızılcahamam, Ankara Province, Turkey. Its population is 151 (2022).
