= Emirgazi, Kahramankazan =

Emirgazi
- Neighbourhood
- Location in Turkey Emirgazi (Turkey Central Anatolia)
- Coordinates: 40.1574°N 32.6373°E
- Country: Turkey
- Province: Ankara
- District: Kahramankazan
- Population (2022): 160
- Time zone: UTC+3 (TRT)

Emirgazi is a neighbourhood in the municipality and district of Kahramankazan, Ankara Province, Turkey. Its population is 160 (2022).
