= Değirmenönü, Kızılcahamam =

Değirmenönü
- Neighbourhood
- Location in Turkey Değirmenönü (Turkey Central Anatolia)
- Coordinates: 40.3373°N 32.5373°E
- Country: Turkey
- Province: Ankara
- District: Kızılcahamam
- Population (2022): 105
- Time zone: UTC+3 (TRT)

Değirmenönü is a neighbourhood in the municipality and district of Kızılcahamam, Ankara Province, Turkey. Its population is 105 (2022).
