= Eğerlikozören, Kızılcahamam =

Eğerlikozören
- Neighbourhood
- Location in Turkey Eğerlikozören (Turkey Central Anatolia)
- Coordinates: 40°34′N 32°46′E
- Country: Turkey
- Province: Ankara
- District: Kızılcahamam
- Population (2022): 176
- Time zone: UTC+3 (TRT)

Eğerlikozören is a neighbourhood in the municipality and district of Kızılcahamam, Ankara Province, Turkey. Its population is 176 (2022).
