= Aksak, Kızılcahamam =

Aksak
- Neighbourhood
- Location in Turkey Aksak (Turkey Central Anatolia)
- Coordinates: 40°31′N 32°43′E
- Country: Turkey
- Province: Ankara
- District: Kızılcahamam
- Population (2022): 44
- Time zone: UTC+3 (TRT)

Aksak is a neighbourhood in the municipality and district of Kızılcahamam, Ankara Province, Turkey. Its population is 44 (2022).
