= Kurutlutepe, Şereflikoçhisar =

Kurutlutepe
- Settlement
- Location in Turkey
- Coordinates: 39°03′N 33°29′E
- Country: Turkey
- Province: Ankara Province
- District: Şereflikoçhisar
- Time zone: UTC+3 (TRT)

Kurutlutepe is a settlement in the District of Şereflikoçhisar, Ankara Province, Turkey.
