= Saraç, Kahramankazan =

Saraç
- Neighbourhood
- Location in Turkey Saraç (Turkey Central Anatolia)
- Coordinates: 40.3049°N 32.7827°E
- Country: Turkey
- Province: Ankara
- District: Kahramankazan
- Population (2022): 73
- Time zone: UTC+3 (TRT)

Saraç is a neighbourhood in the municipality and district of Kahramankazan, Ankara Province, Turkey. Its population is 73 (2022).
