= Sarıayak, Kahramankazan =

Sarıayak
- Neighbourhood
- Country: Turkey
- Province: Ankara
- District: Kahramankazan
- Population (2022): 58
- Time zone: UTC+3 (TRT)

Sarıayak is a neighbourhood in the municipality and district of Kahramankazan, Ankara Province, Turkey. Its population is 58 (2022).
