= Güvem, Kızılcahamam =

Güvem
- Neighbourhood
- Location in Turkey Güvem (Turkey Central Anatolia)
- Coordinates: 40.5907°N 32.6611°E
- Country: Turkey
- Province: Ankara
- District: Kızılcahamam
- Population (2022): 186
- Time zone: UTC+3 (TRT)

Güvem is a neighbourhood in the municipality and district of Kızılcahamam, Ankara Province, Turkey. Its population is 186 (2022).
