= Alpagut, Kızılcahamam =

Alpagut
- Neighbourhood
- Location in Turkey Alpagut (Turkey Central Anatolia)
- Coordinates: 40.3005°N 32.4209°E
- Country: Turkey
- Province: Ankara
- District: Kızılcahamam
- Population (2022): 82
- Time zone: UTC+3 (TRT)

Alpagut is a neighbourhood in the municipality and district of Kızılcahamam, Ankara Province, Turkey. Its population is 82 (2022).
