= Aşağıkaraören, Kahramankazan =

Aşağıkaraören
- Neighbourhood
- Location in Turkey Aşağıkaraören (Turkey Central Anatolia)
- Coordinates: 40°16′57″N 32°45′06″E
- Country: Turkey
- Province: Ankara
- District: Kahramankazan
- Population (2022): 127
- Time zone: UTC+3 (TRT)

Aşağıkaraören is a neighbourhood in the municipality and district of Kahramankazan, Ankara Province, Turkey. Its population was 127 in 2022.
