= Yakakaya, Kızılcahamam =

Yakakaya
- Neighbourhood
- Location in Turkey Yakakaya (Turkey Central Anatolia)
- Coordinates: 40.3765°N 32.4617°E
- Country: Turkey
- Province: Ankara
- District: Kızılcahamam
- Population (2022): 72
- Time zone: UTC+3 (TRT)

Yakakaya is a neighbourhood in the municipality and district of Kızılcahamam, Ankara Province, Turkey. Its population is 72 (2022).
