= Eğerlidere, Kızılcahamam =

Eğerlidere
- Neighbourhood
- Location in Turkey Eğerlidere (Turkey Central Anatolia)
- Coordinates: 40°34′N 32°44′E
- Country: Turkey
- Province: Ankara
- District: Kızılcahamam
- Population (2022): 253
- Time zone: UTC+3 (TRT)

Eğerlidere is a neighbourhood in the municipality and district of Kızılcahamam, Ankara Province, Turkey. Its population is 253 (2022).
