= Derekışla, Bala =

Derekışla
- Neighbourhood
- Location in Turkey Derekışla (Turkey Central Anatolia)
- Coordinates: 39.3301°N 33.0144°E
- Country: Turkey
- Province: Ankara
- District: Bala
- Population (2022): 255
- Time zone: UTC+3 (TRT)

Derekışla is a neighbourhood in the municipality and district of Bala, Ankara Province, Turkey. Its population is 255 (2022).

The village is populated by Kurds.

== Notable people ==
- Kemal Aydın professional football player
