= Bağlıca, Kızılcahamam =

Bağlıca
- Neighbourhood
- Location in Turkey Bağlıca (Turkey Central Anatolia)
- Coordinates: 40.3053°N 32.4552°E
- Country: Turkey
- Province: Ankara
- District: Kızılcahamam
- Population (2022): 60
- Time zone: UTC+3 (TRT)

Bağlıca is a neighbourhood in the municipality and district of Kızılcahamam, Ankara Province, Turkey. Its population is 60 (2022).
