= Semer, Kızılcahamam =

Semer
- Neighbourhood
- Location within Turkey Location within Turkey Central Anatolia
- Coordinates: 40.5906°N 32.8992°E
- Country: Turkey
- Province: Ankara
- District: Kızılcahamam
- Population (2022): 334
- Time zone: UTC+3 (TRT)

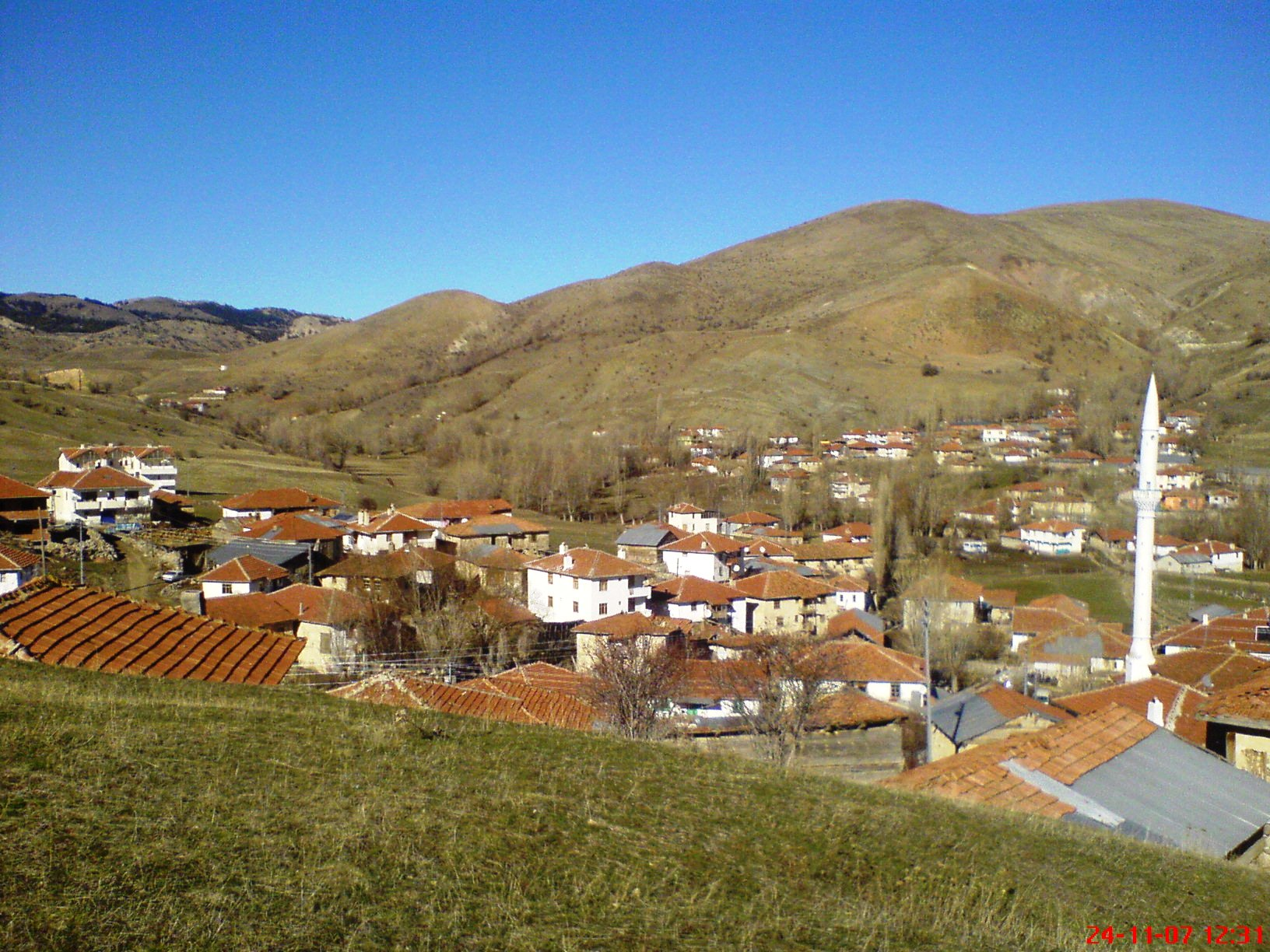
Semer Village, Turkey

Semer is a neighbourhood in the municipality and district of Kızılcahamam, Ankara Province, Turkey. Its population is 334 (2022).
