= Dağyaka, Kahramankazan =

Dağyaka
- Neighbourhood
- Location in Turkey Dağyaka (Turkey Central Anatolia)
- Coordinates: 40°05′N 32°40′E
- Country: Turkey
- Province: Ankara
- District: Kahramankazan
- Population (2022): 69
- Time zone: UTC+3 (TRT)

Dağyaka is a neighbourhood in the municipality and district of Kahramankazan, Ankara Province, Turkey. Its population is 69 (2022).
