= Ciğirler, Kızılcahamam =

Ciğirler
- Neighbourhood
- Location in Turkey Ciğirler (Turkey Central Anatolia)
- Coordinates: 40°29′56″N 32°38′48″E
- Country: Turkey
- Province: Ankara
- District: Kızılcahamam
- Population (2022): 125
- Time zone: UTC+3 (TRT)

Ciğirler is a neighbourhood in the municipality and district of Kızılcahamam, Ankara Province, Turkey. Its population is 125 (2022).
