= Salın, Kızılcahamam =

Salın
- Neighbourhood
- Location in Turkey Salın (Turkey Central Anatolia)
- Coordinates: 40.6395°N 32.7043°E
- Country: Turkey
- Province: Ankara
- District: Kızılcahamam
- Population (2022): 504
- Time zone: UTC+3 (TRT)

Salın is a neighbourhood in the municipality and district of Kızılcahamam, Ankara Province, Turkey. Its population is 504 (2022).
