= Kocalar, Kızılcahamam =

Kocalar
- Neighbourhood
- Location in Turkey Kocalar (Turkey Central Anatolia)
- Coordinates: 40.3076°N 32.5242°E
- Country: Turkey
- Province: Ankara
- District: Kızılcahamam
- Population (2022): 20
- Time zone: UTC+3 (TRT)

Kocalar is a neighbourhood in the municipality and district of Kızılcahamam, Ankara Province, Turkey. Its population is 20 (2022).
