= Belpınar, Kızılcahamam =

Belpınar
- Neighbourhood
- Location in Turkey Belpınar (Turkey Central Anatolia)
- Coordinates: 40.6484°N 32.7164°E
- Country: Turkey
- Province: Ankara
- District: Kızılcahamam
- Population (2022): 134
- Time zone: UTC+3 (TRT)

Belpınar is a neighbourhood in the municipality and district of Kızılcahamam, Ankara Province, Turkey. Its population is 134 (2022).
