= Yağcıhüseyin, Kızılcahamam =

Yağcıhüseyin
- Neighbourhood
- Location in Turkey Yağcıhüseyin (Turkey Central Anatolia)
- Coordinates: 40°39′N 32°45′E
- Country: Turkey
- Province: Ankara
- District: Kızılcahamam
- Population (2022): 229
- Time zone: UTC+3 (TRT)

Yağcıhüseyin is a neighbourhood in the municipality and district of Kızılcahamam, Ankara Province, Turkey. Its population is 229 (2022).
