= Aşağıhüyük, Kızılcahamam =

Aşağıhüyük
- Neighbourhood
- Location in Turkey Aşağıhüyük (Turkey Central Anatolia)
- Coordinates: 40.3529°N 32.3667°E
- Country: Turkey
- Province: Ankara
- District: Kızılcahamam
- Population (2022): 134
- Time zone: UTC+3 (TRT)

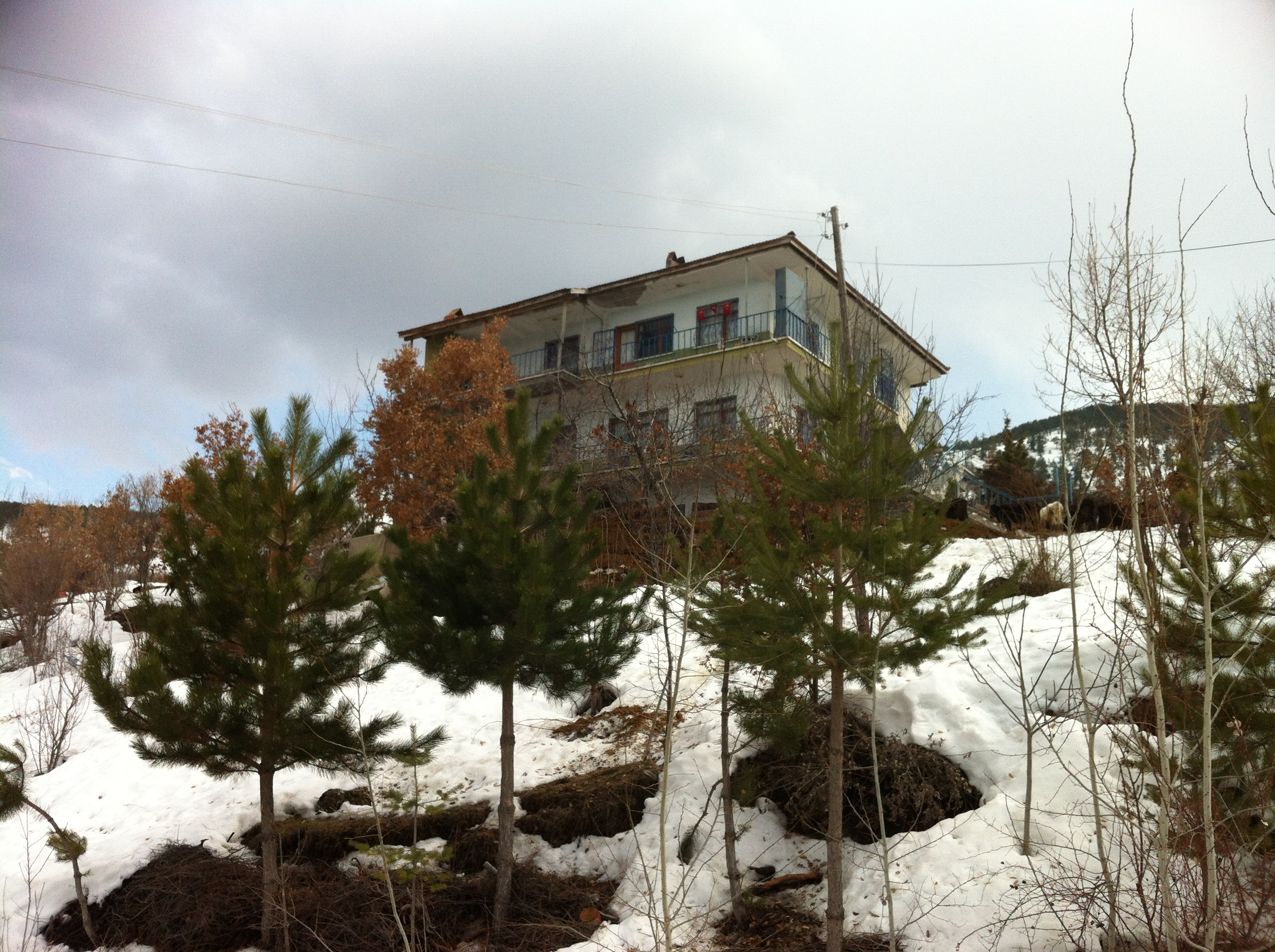
Aşağıhüyük/Kızılcahamam/ANKARA

Aşağıhüyük is a neighbourhood in the municipality and district of Kızılcahamam, Ankara Province, Turkey. Its population was 134 in 2022.
