= Yıldırımören, Kızılcahamam =

Yıldırımören
- Neighbourhood
- Location in Turkey Yıldırımören (Turkey Central Anatolia)
- Coordinates: 40°29′N 32°48′E
- Country: Turkey
- Province: Ankara
- District: Kızılcahamam
- Population (2022): 61
- Time zone: UTC+3 (TRT)

Yıldırımören is a neighbourhood in the municipality and district of Kızılcahamam, Ankara Province, Turkey. Its population is 61 (2022).
