= Semeler, Kızılcahamam =

Semeler
- Neighbourhood
- Country: Turkey
- Province: Ankara
- District: Kızılcahamam
- Population (2022): 56
- Time zone: UTC+3 (TRT)

Semeler is a neighbourhood in the municipality and district of Kızılcahamam, Ankara Province, Turkey. Its population is 56 (2022).
