= Fethiye, Kahramankazan =

Fethiye
- Neighbourhood
- Location in Turkey Fethiye (Turkey Central Anatolia)
- Coordinates: 40.1283°N 32.5572°E
- Country: Turkey
- Province: Ankara
- District: Kahramankazan
- Population (2022): 311
- Time zone: UTC+3 (TRT)

Fethiye is a neighbourhood in the municipality and district of Kahramankazan, Ankara Province, Turkey. Its population is 311 (2022).
