= Dutözü, Kahramankazan =

Dutözü
- Neighbourhood
- Country: Turkey
- Province: Ankara
- District: Kahramankazan
- Population (2022): 46
- Time zone: UTC+3 (TRT)

Dutözü is a neighbourhood in the municipality and district of Kahramankazan, Ankara Province, Turkey. Its population is 46 (2022).
