= Yanık Özbekler, Kızılcahamam =

Yanık Özbekler
- Neighbourhood
- Location in Turkey Yanık Özbekler (Turkey Central Anatolia)
- Coordinates: 40.5299°N 32.6098°E
- Country: Turkey
- Province: Ankara
- District: Kızılcahamam
- Population (2022): 194
- Time zone: UTC+3 (TRT)

Yanık Özbekler is a neighbourhood in the municipality and district of Kızılcahamam, Ankara Province, Turkey. Its population is 194 (2022).
