= Kışla, Kahramankazan =

Kışla
- Neighbourhood
- Location in Turkey Kışla (Turkey Central Anatolia)
- Coordinates: 40.0991°N 32.6021°E
- Country: Turkey
- Province: Ankara
- District: Kahramankazan
- Population (2022): 129
- Time zone: UTC+3 (TRT)

Kışla is a neighbourhood in the municipality and district of Kahramankazan, Ankara Province, Turkey. Its population is 129 (2022).
