= Kurumcu, Kızılcahamam =

Neighbourhood in Kızılcahamam, Turkey

Kurumcu
- Neighbourhood
- Location in Turkey Kurumcu (Turkey Central Anatolia)
- Coordinates: 40.3532°N 32.3965°E
- Country: Turkey
- Province: Ankara
- District: Kızılcahamam
- Population (2022): 79
- Time zone: UTC+3 (TRT)

Kurumcu is a neighbourhood in the municipality and district of Kızılcahamam, Ankara Province, Turkey. Its population is 79 (2022).
