= Akçaören, Kahramankazan =

Akçaören
- Neighbourhood
- Location in Turkey Akçaören (Turkey Central Anatolia)
- Coordinates: 40.2721°N 32.7274°E
- Country: Turkey
- Province: Ankara
- District: Kahramankazan
- Population (2022): 103
- Time zone: UTC+3 (TRT)

Akçaören is a neighbourhood in the municipality and district of Kahramankazan, Ankara Province, Turkey. Its population is 103 (2022).
