= Yayalar, Kahramankazan =

Yayalar
- Neighbourhood
- Country: Turkey
- Province: Ankara
- District: Kahramankazan
- Population (2022): 28
- Time zone: UTC+3 (TRT)

Yayalar is a neighbourhood in the municipality and district of Kahramankazan, Ankara Province, Turkey. Its population is 28 (2022).
