= Çukurören, Kızılcahamam =

Çukurören
- Neighbourhood
- Location in Turkey Çukurören (Turkey Central Anatolia)
- Coordinates: 40.5268°N 32.6991°E
- Country: Turkey
- Province: Ankara
- District: Kızılcahamam
- Population (2022): 97
- Time zone: UTC+3 (TRT)

Çukurören is a neighbourhood in the Kızılcahamam district of Ankara Province, Turkey, with a population of 97 as of 2022.
