= Yazıbeyli, Kahramankazan =

Yazıbeyli
- Neighbourhood
- Location in Turkey Yazıbeyli (Turkey Central Anatolia)
- Coordinates: 40°11′N 32°40′E
- Country: Turkey
- Province: Ankara
- District: Kahramankazan
- Population (2022): 187
- Time zone: UTC+3 (TRT)

Yazıbeyli is a neighbourhood in the municipality and district of Kahramankazan, Ankara Province, Turkey. Its population is 187 (2022).
