= Orhaniye, Kahramankazan =

Orhaniye
- Neighbourhood
- Location in Turkey Orhaniye (Turkey Central Anatolia)
- Coordinates: 40.1022°N 32.6740°E
- Country: Turkey
- Province: Ankara
- District: Kahramankazan
- Population (2022): 475
- Time zone: UTC+3 (TRT)

Orhaniye is a neighbourhood in the municipality and district of Kahramankazan, Ankara Province, Turkey. Its population is 475 (2022).
