= Başağaç, Kızılcahamam =

Başağaç
- Neighbourhood
- Location in Turkey Başağaç (Turkey Central Anatolia)
- Coordinates: 40.3200°N 32.3981°E
- Country: Turkey
- Province: Ankara
- District: Kızılcahamam
- Population (2022): 110
- Time zone: UTC+3 (TRT)

Başağaç is a neighbourhood in the municipality and district of Kızılcahamam, Ankara Province, Turkey. Its population is 110 (2022).
