= Aşağıada, Kızılcahamam =

Aşağıada
- Neighbourhood
- Location in Turkey Aşağıada (Turkey Central Anatolia)
- Coordinates: 40.2763°N 32.4811°E
- Country: Turkey
- Province: Ankara
- District: Kızılcahamam
- Population (2022): 54
- Time zone: UTC+3 (TRT)

Aşağıada is a neighbourhood in the municipality and district of Kızılcahamam, Ankara Province, Turkey. Its population is 54 (2022).
