= Bulak, Kizhinginsky District, Republic of Buryatia =

Bulak Булак
- Ulus
- Location within Republic of Buryatia Location within Russia
- Coordinates: 51°58′N 110°33′E
- Country: Russia
- Region: Republic of Buryatia
- District: Kizhinginsky District
- Time zone: UTC+8:00

Bulak (Russian: Булак; Buryat: Булаг, Bulag) is a rural locality (an ulus) in Kizhinginsky District, Republic of Buryatia, Russia. The population was 202 as of 2010. There are 3 streets.

== Geography ==
Bulak is located 56 km northeast of Kizhinga (the district's administrative centre) by road. Chesan is the nearest rural locality.
