= Yukarıçanlı, Kızılcahamam =

Yukarıçanlı
- Neighbourhood
- Location in Turkey Yukarıçanlı (Turkey Central Anatolia)
- Coordinates: 40°39′N 32°42′E
- Country: Turkey
- Province: Ankara
- District: Kızılcahamam
- Population (2022): 179
- Time zone: UTC+3 (TRT)

Yukarıçanlı is a neighbourhood in the municipality and district of Kızılcahamam, Ankara Province, Turkey. Its population is 179 (2022).
