= Gebeler, Kızılcahamam =

Gebeler
- Neighbourhood
- Location in Turkey Gebeler (Turkey Central Anatolia)
- Coordinates: 40.6305°N 32.5118°E
- Country: Turkey
- Province: Ankara
- District: Kızılcahamam
- Population (2022): 103
- Time zone: UTC+3 (TRT)

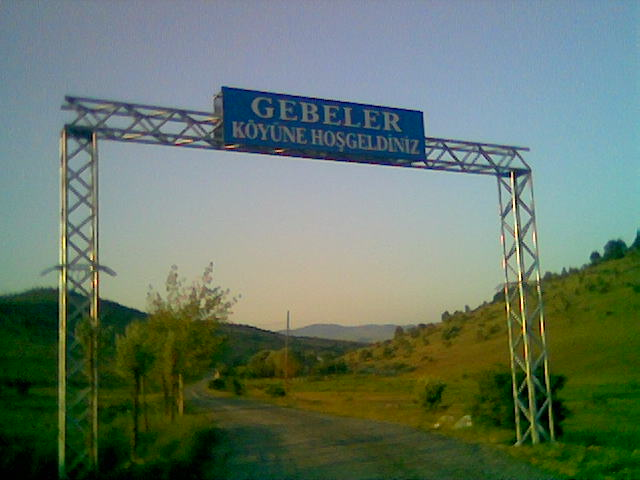

Gebeler is a neighbourhood in the municipality and district of Kızılcahamam, Ankara Province, Turkey. Its population is 103 (2022).
