= İnceğiz, Kızılcahamam =

İnceğiz
- Neighbourhood
- Country: Turkey
- Province: Ankara
- District: Kızılcahamam
- Population (2022): 69
- Time zone: UTC+3 (TRT)

İnceğiz is a neighbourhood in the municipality and district of Kızılcahamam, Ankara Province, Turkey. Its population is 69 (2022).
