= Soğucak, Kahramankazan =

Soğucak
- Neighbourhood
- Location in Turkey Soğucak (Turkey Central Anatolia)
- Coordinates: 40.2407°N 32.6268°E
- Country: Turkey
- Province: Ankara
- District: Kahramankazan
- Population (2022): 277
- Time zone: UTC+3 (TRT)

Soğucak is a neighbourhood in the municipality and district of Kahramankazan, Ankara Province, Turkey. Its population is 277 (2022).
