= Sincik, Polatlı =

Sincik
- Neighbourhood
- Location in Turkey Sincik (Turkey Central Anatolia)
- Coordinates: 39°2′38″N 32°17′12″E
- Country: Turkey
- Province: Ankara
- District: Polatlı
- Population (2022): 126
- Time zone: UTC+3 (TRT)

Sincik is a neighbourhood in the municipality and district of Polatlı, Ankara Province, Turkey. Its population is 126 (2022). In 2006 it passed from the Haymana District to the Polatlı District.

== Population ==
The village is populated by Kurds. In 1940 the village counted 132 inhabitants, consisting of 66 males and 66 females.
