= Kırkırca, Kızılcahamam =

Kırkırca
- Neighbourhood
- Location in Turkey Kırkırca (Turkey Central Anatolia)
- Coordinates: 40°17′N 32°24′E
- Country: Turkey
- Province: Ankara
- District: Kızılcahamam
- Population (2022): 107
- Time zone: UTC+3 (TRT)

Kırkırca is a neighbourhood in the municipality and district of Kızılcahamam, Ankara Province, Turkey. Its population is 107 (2022).
