= İymir, Kahramankazan =

İymir
- Neighbourhood
- Location in Turkey İymir (Turkey Central Anatolia)
- Coordinates: 40.1971°N 32.6374°E
- Country: Turkey
- Province: Ankara
- District: Kahramankazan
- Population (2022): 114
- Time zone: UTC+3 (TRT)

İymir is a neighbourhood in the municipality and district of Kahramankazan, Ankara Province, Turkey. Its population is 114 (2022).
