= Yıldırımçatak, Kızılcahamam =

Yıldırımçatak
- Neighbourhood
- Location in Turkey Yıldırımçatak (Turkey Central Anatolia)
- Coordinates: 40°28′N 32°52′E
- Country: Turkey
- Province: Ankara
- District: Kızılcahamam
- Population (2022): 43
- Time zone: UTC+3 (TRT)

Yıldırımçatak is a neighbourhood in the municipality and district of Kızılcahamam, Ankara Province, Turkey. Its population is 43 (2022).
