= Mahkemeağcin, Kızılcahamam =

Mahkemeağcin
- Neighbourhood
- Location in Turkey Mahkemeağcin (Turkey Central Anatolia)
- Coordinates: 40°21′N 32°33′E
- Country: Turkey
- Province: Ankara
- District: Kızılcahamam
- Population (2022): 60
- Time zone: UTC+3 (TRT)

Mahkemeağcin is a neighbourhood in the municipality and district of Kızılcahamam, Ankara Province, Turkey. Its population is 60 (2022).
