= Oğlakcı, Kızılcahamam =

Oğlakcı
- Neighbourhood
- Location in Turkey Oğlakcı (Turkey Central Anatolia)
- Coordinates: 40.5269°N 32.6573°E
- Country: Turkey
- Province: Ankara
- District: Kızılcahamam
- Population (2022): 74
- Time zone: UTC+3 (TRT)

Oğlakcı is a neighbourhood in the municipality and district of Kızılcahamam, Ankara Province, Turkey. Its population is 74 (2022).
