= Kumpınar, Kahramankazan =

Kumpınar
- Neighbourhood
- Location in Turkey Kumpınar (Turkey Central Anatolia)
- Coordinates: 40°11′N 32°41′E
- Country: Turkey
- Province: Ankara
- District: Kahramankazan
- Population (2022): 121
- Time zone: UTC+3 (TRT)

Kumpınar is a neighbourhood in the municipality and district of Kahramankazan, Ankara Province, Turkey. Its population is 121 (2022).
