= Deveci, Haymana =

Deveci
- Neighbourhood
- Location in Turkey Deveci (Turkey Central Anatolia)
- Coordinates: 39.6036°N 32.5436°E
- Country: Turkey
- Province: Ankara
- District: Haymana
- Population (2022): 187
- Time zone: UTC+3 (TRT)

Deveci is a neighbourhood in the municipality and district of Haymana, Ankara Province, Turkey. Its population is 187 (2022).
