= Ortaköy, Kızılcahamam =

Ortaköy
- Neighbourhood
- Location in Turkey Ortaköy (Turkey Central Anatolia)
- Coordinates: 40.5971°N 32.8989°E
- Country: Turkey
- Province: Ankara
- District: Kızılcahamam
- Population (2022): 109
- Time zone: UTC+3 (TRT)

Ortaköy is a neighbourhood in the municipality and district of Kızılcahamam, Ankara Province, Turkey. Its population is 109 (2022).
