= Çeştepe, Kızılcahamam =

Çeştepe
- Neighbourhood
- Location in Turkey Çeştepe (Turkey Central Anatolia)
- Coordinates: 40°20′N 32°41′E
- Country: Turkey
- Province: Ankara
- District: Kızılcahamam
- Population (2022): 98
- Time zone: UTC+3 (TRT)

Çeştepe is a neighbourhood in the municipality and district of Kızılcahamam, Ankara Province, Turkey. Its population is 98 (2022).
