= Çavuşlar, Kızılcahamam =

Çavuşlar
- Neighbourhood
- Location in Turkey Çavuşlar (Turkey Central Anatolia)
- Coordinates: 40.3280°N 32.5280°E
- Country: Turkey
- Province: Ankara
- District: Kızılcahamam
- Population (2022): 61
- Time zone: UTC+3 (TRT)

Çavuşlar is a neighbourhood in the municipality and district of Kızılcahamam, Ankara Province, Turkey. Its population is 61 (2022).
