= Çimşit, Kahramankazan =

Çimşit
- Neighbourhood
- Location in Turkey Çimşit (Turkey Central Anatolia)
- Coordinates: 40.1559°N 32.6278°E
- Country: Turkey
- Province: Ankara
- District: Kahramankazan
- Population (2022): 138
- Time zone: UTC+3 (TRT)

Çimşit is a neighbourhood in the municipality and district of Kahramankazan, Ankara Province, Turkey. Its population is 138 (2022).
