= Beşkonak, Kızılcahamam =

Beşkonak
- Neighbourhood
- Location in Turkey Beşkonak (Turkey Central Anatolia)
- Coordinates: 40.6251°N 32.6901°E
- Country: Turkey
- Province: Ankara
- District: Kızılcahamam
- Population (2022): 237
- Time zone: UTC+3 (TRT)

Beşkonak is a neighbourhood in the municipality and district of Kızılcahamam, Ankara Province, Turkey. Its population is 237 (2022).
