= Alibey, Kızılcahamam =

Alibey
- Neighbourhood
- Location in Turkey Alibey (Turkey Central Anatolia)
- Coordinates: 40.2668°N 32.5055°E
- Country: Turkey
- Province: Ankara
- District: Kızılcahamam
- Population (2022): 47
- Time zone: UTC+3 (TRT)

Alibey is a neighbourhood in the municipality and district of Kızılcahamam, Ankara Province, Turkey. Its population is 47 (2022).
