= Vayvay, Şereflikoçhisar =

Vayvay
- Settlement
- Location in Turkey
- Coordinates: 39°02′N 33°31′E
- Country: Turkey
- Province: Ankara Province
- District: Şereflikoçhisar
- Time zone: UTC+3 (TRT)

Vayvay is a settlement in the District of Şereflikoçhisar, Ankara Province, Turkey.
