= Karalar, Kahramankazan =

Karalar
- Neighbourhood
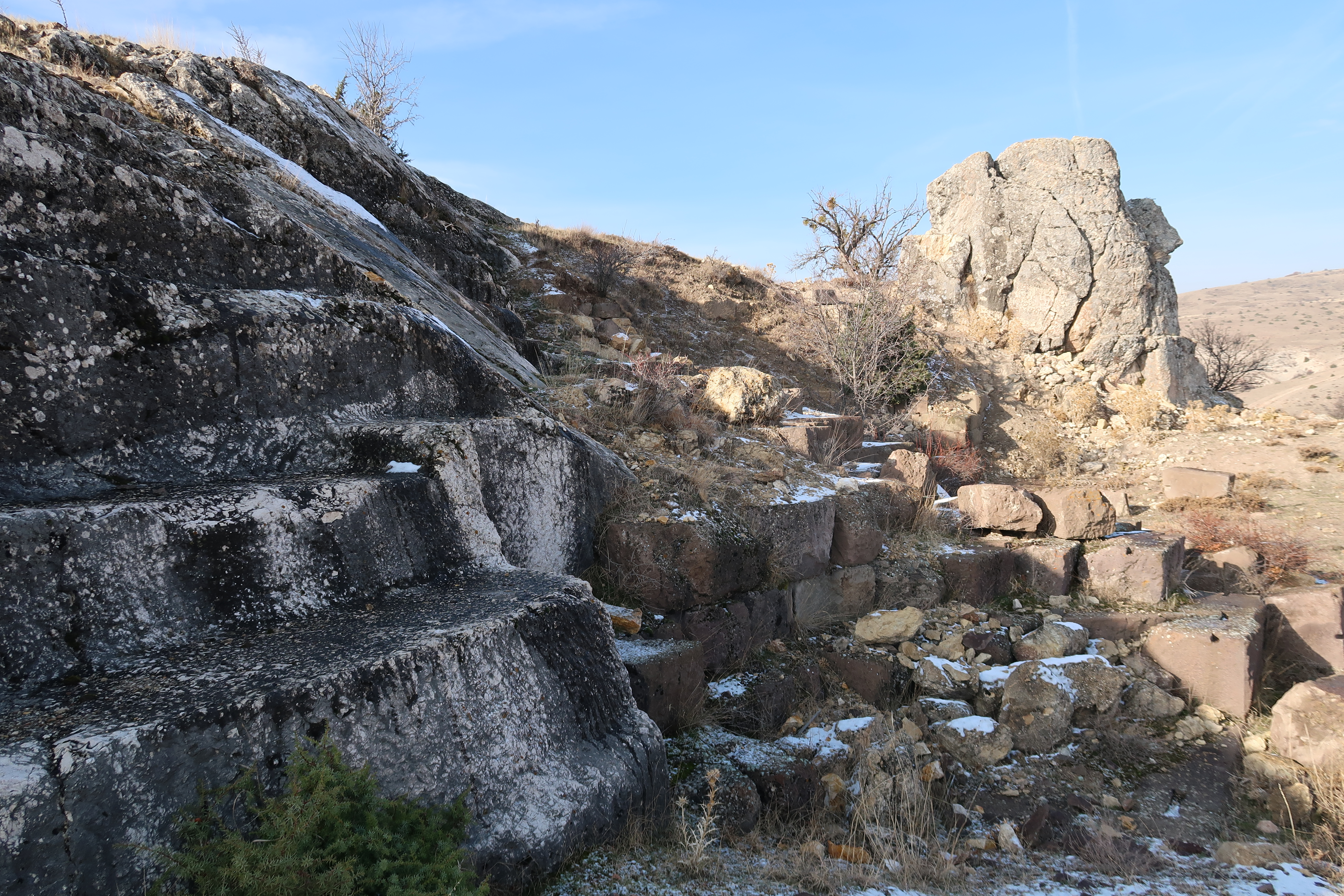
- Roman temple and fortress, including rocky outcrop, at Mariegordus

- Location within Turkey Location within Turkey Central Anatolia
- Coordinates: 40°11′49″N 32°36′11″E
- Country: Turkey
- Province: Ankara
- District: Kahramankazan
- Population (2022): 170
- Time zone: UTC+3 (TRT)

Karalar is a neighbourhood in the municipality and district of Kahramankazan, Ankara Province, Turkey. Its population is 170 (2022).

North of the town is the site of the ancient Roman settlement of Mariegordus, where the ruins of a temple and burial mounds can be seen. The ancient Galatian fortress Bloukion was situated near Karalar.
