= Şahinler, Kızılcahamam =

Şahinler
- Neighbourhood
- Location in Turkey Şahinler (Turkey Central Anatolia)
- Coordinates: 40.6685°N 32.4603°E
- Country: Turkey
- Province: Ankara
- District: Kızılcahamam
- Population (2022): 114
- Time zone: UTC+3 (TRT)

Şahinler is a neighbourhood in the municipality and district of Kızılcahamam, Ankara Province, Turkey. Its population is 114 (2022).
