= Şehriban, Bala =

Şehriban
- Neighbourhood
- Location in Turkey Şehriban (Turkey Central Anatolia)
- Coordinates: 39°37′N 33°16′E
- Country: Turkey
- Province: Ankara
- District: Bala
- Population (2022): 239
- Time zone: UTC+3 (TRT)

Şehriban is a neighbourhood in the municipality and district of Bala, Ankara Province, Turkey. Its population is 239 (2022).
