= Kınık, Kahramankazan =

Kınık
- Neighbourhood
- Location in Turkey Kınık (Turkey Central Anatolia)
- Coordinates: 40.1715°N 32.5611°E
- Country: Turkey
- Province: Ankara
- District: Kahramankazan
- Population (2022): 169
- Time zone: UTC+3 (TRT)

Kınık is a neighbourhood in the municipality and district of Kahramankazan, Ankara Province, Turkey. Its population is 169 (2022).
