= Pazar Kınık, Kızılcahamam =

Pazar Kınık
- Neighbourhood
- Location in Turkey Pazar Kınık (Turkey Central Anatolia)
- Coordinates: 40°21′44″N 32°45′20″E
- Country: Turkey
- Province: Ankara
- District: Kızılcahamam
- Population (2022): 101
- Time zone: UTC+3 (TRT)

Pazar Kınık (also: Yukarı Kınık) is a neighbourhood in the municipality and district of Kızılcahamam, Ankara Province, Turkey. Its population is 101 (2022).
