= Sancar, Kahramankazan =

Sancar
- Neighbourhood
- Country: Turkey
- Province: Ankara
- District: Kahramankazan
- Population (2022): 149
- Time zone: UTC+3 (TRT)

Sancar is a neighbourhood in the municipality and district of Kahramankazan, Ankara Province, Turkey. Its population is 149 (2022).
