= Bulak, Kızılcahamam =

Bulak
- Neighbourhood
- Location in Turkey Bulak (Turkey Central Anatolia)
- Coordinates: 40.5674°N 32.5980°E
- Country: Turkey
- Province: Ankara
- District: Kızılcahamam
- Population (2022): 172
- Time zone: UTC+3 (TRT)

Bulak is a neighbourhood in the municipality and district of Kızılcahamam, Ankara Province, Turkey. Its population is 172 (2022).
