= Kınık, Kalecik =

Kınık
- Neighbourhood
- Country: Turkey
- Province: Ankara
- District: Kalecik
- Population (2022): 198
- Time zone: UTC+3 (TRT)

Kınık is a neighbourhood in the municipality and district of Kalecik, Ankara Province, Turkey. Its population is 198 (2022).

== History ==
The customs of the village are based on ancient traditions. Weddings are custom-made and last for three days. Meals are prepared according to the old style.

The economy depends on agriculture and animal husbandry but there are insufficient agricultural resources in the village.

== Geography ==
The village is located 108 kilometres (67 mi) from Ankara, 52 kilometres (32 mi) from Kalecik town and 70 kilometres (43 mi) from Çubuk. The climate is Continental, hot and often humid in summers and sometimes severely cold in winters.
