= Kınık, Kızılcahamam =

Kınık
- Neighbourhood
- Location in Turkey Kınık (Turkey Central Anatolia)
- Coordinates: 40°22′1″N 32°18′17″E
- Country: Turkey
- Province: Ankara
- District: Kızılcahamam
- Population (2022): 55
- Time zone: UTC+3 (TRT)

Kınık (also: Çeltikçi Kınık or Aşağı Kınık) is a neighbourhood in the municipality and district of Kızılcahamam, Ankara Province, Turkey. Its population is 55 (2022).
