= Kırköy, Kızılcahamam =

Kırköy
- Neighbourhood
- Location in Turkey Kırköy (Turkey Central Anatolia)
- Coordinates: 40.4521°N 32.7111°E
- Country: Turkey
- Province: Ankara
- District: Kızılcahamam
- Population (2022): 150
- Time zone: UTC+3 (TRT)

Kırköy is a neighbourhood in the municipality and district of Kızılcahamam, Ankara Province, Turkey. Its population is 150 (2022).
