= Saray, Kızılcahamam =

Saray
- Neighbourhood
- Location in Turkey Saray (Turkey Central Anatolia)
- Coordinates: 40.5262°N 32.6704°E
- Country: Turkey
- Province: Ankara
- District: Kızılcahamam
- Population (2022): 61
- Time zone: UTC+3 (TRT)

Saray is a neighbourhood in the municipality and district of Kızılcahamam, Ankara Province, Turkey. Its population is 61 (2022).
