= Kızılcahamam =

- District and municipality
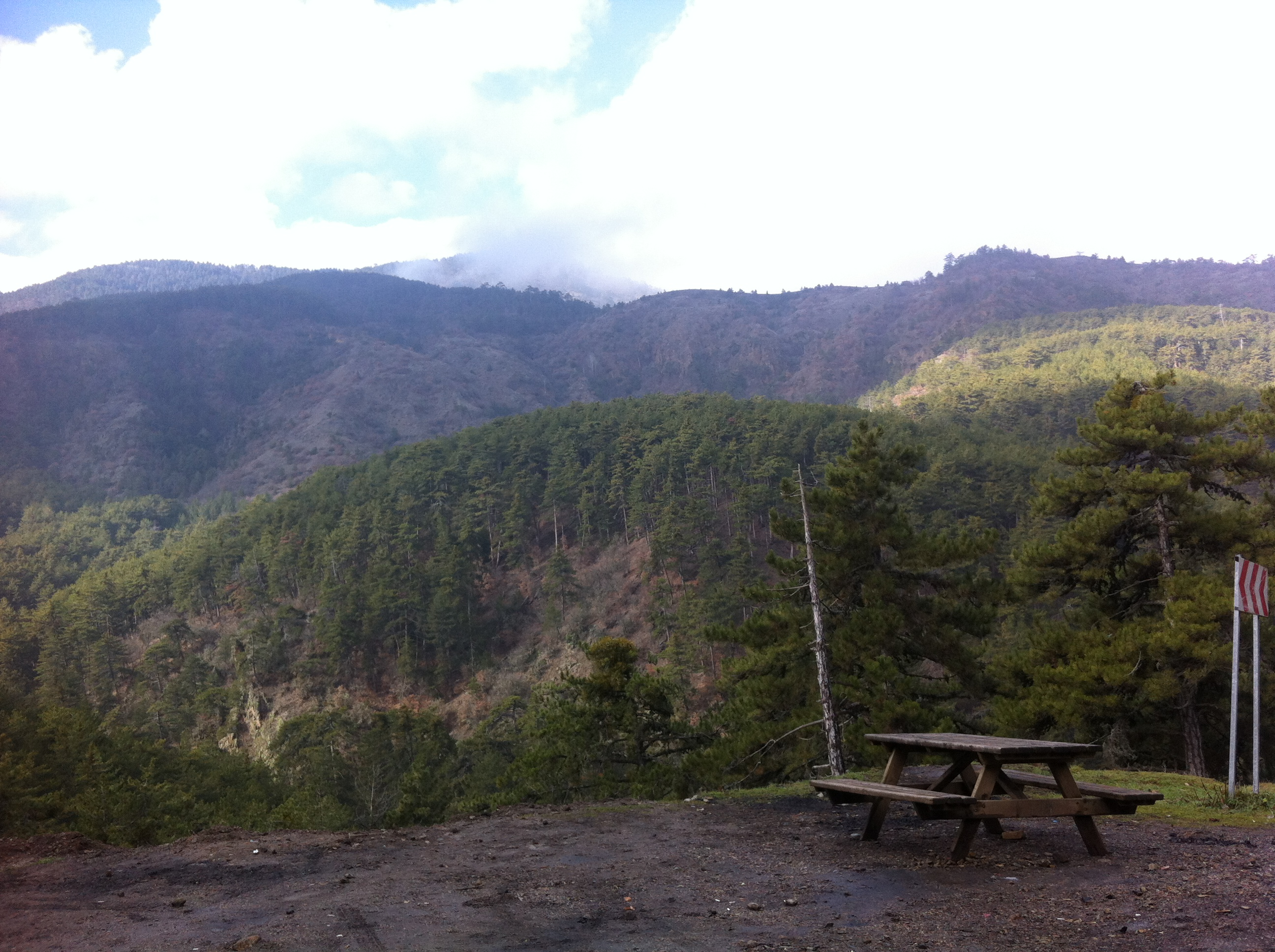
- A nature scene from Kızılcahamam

- Map showing Kızılcahamam District in Ankara Province

- Location within Turkey Location within Turkey Central Anatolia
- Coordinates: 40°28′11″N 32°39′02″E
- Country: Turkey
- Province: Ankara

Government
  - Mayor: Süleyman Acar (AKP)
- Area: 1,623 km^{2} (627 sq mi)
- Elevation: 975 m (3,199 ft)
- Population (2022): 26,872
  - Density: 16.56/km^{2} (42.88/sq mi)
- Time zone: UTC+3 (TRT)
- Area code: 0312
- Website: www.kizilcahamam.bel.tr

Kızılcahamam is a municipality and district of Ankara Province, Turkey. Its area is 1,623 km^{2}, and its population is 26,872 (2022). It is 70 km north of the city of Ankara, near the motorway to Istanbul. Its elevation is 975 m. The area is mountain and forest, a geographical boundary between central Anatolia and the Black Sea regions.

Kızılcahamam itself is a quiet market town known for its healing hot springs and mineral waters. Nearby Soğuksu National Park contains a scout camp and trails, and areas for picnicking in the forest. There are hotels and guest houses including spa hotels. A sculpture of black vulture, an endangered bird species inhabited in the national park, is situated at the entrance of the town.

== Climate ==
The climate in Kızılcahamam can be classified as a Mediterranean climate (Köppen: Csb) or a humid continental climate (Köppen: Dsb).

Climate data for Kızılcahamam (1991–2020)
Month	Jan	Feb	Mar	Apr	May	Jun	Jul	Aug	Sep	Oct	Nov	Dec	Year
Mean daily maximum °C (°F)	3.4 (38.1)	5.7 (42.3)	10.3 (50.5)	15.7 (60.3)	21.0 (69.8)	25.3 (77.5)	29.3 (84.7)	29.7 (85.5)	24.9 (76.8)	18.7 (65.7)	11.6 (52.9)	5.4 (41.7)	16.8 (62.2)
Daily mean °C (°F)	−1.0 (30.2)	0.5 (32.9)	4.2 (39.6)	9.1 (48.4)	14.0 (57.2)	18.0 (64.4)	21.6 (70.9)	21.7 (71.1)	16.9 (62.4)	11.3 (52.3)	5.0 (41.0)	0.8 (33.4)	10.2 (50.4)
Mean daily minimum °C (°F)	−4.5 (23.9)	−3.7 (25.3)	−1.0 (30.2)	2.9 (37.2)	7.3 (45.1)	10.9 (51.6)	13.7 (56.7)	13.8 (56.8)	9.3 (48.7)	5.1 (41.2)	0.0 (32.0)	−2.7 (27.1)	4.3 (39.7)
Average precipitation mm (inches)	67.03 (2.64)	53.27 (2.10)	58.31 (2.30)	60.04 (2.36)	63.06 (2.48)	46.13 (1.82)	23.47 (0.92)	20.91 (0.82)	23.87 (0.94)	40.54 (1.60)	39.68 (1.56)	74.88 (2.95)	571.19 (22.49)
Average precipitation days (≥ 1.0 mm)	8.4	7.4	8.2	8.7	9.0	7.7	3.5	3.3	4.0	5.5	5.3	8.6	79.6
Average relative humidity (%)	79.7	75.2	68.2	63.6	63.8	61.9	53.9	53.6	57.0	66.1	72.2	79.5	66.2
Source: NOAA

== Composition ==
There are 109 neighbourhoods in Kızılcahamam District:

- Akçakese
- Akçaören
- Akçay
- Akdoğan
- Aksak
- Alibey
- Alpagut
- Aşağıada
- Aşağıçanlı
- Aşağıhüyük
- Ayvacık
- Bademli
- Bağlıca
- Bağören
- Balcılar
- Başağaç
- Başören
- Bayır
- Belpınar
- Berçinçatak
- Berçinyayalar
- Beşkonak
- Bezcikuzören
- Binkoz
- Bulak
- Çavuşlar
- Çeltikçi
- Çeştepe
- Ciğirler
- Çırpan
- Çukurca
- Çukurören
- Değirmenönü
- Demirciören
- Dereneci
- Doğanözü
- Doymuşören
- Eğerlialören
- Eğerlibaşköy
- Eğerlidere
- Eğerlikozören
- Esenler
- Gebeler
- Gökbel
- Gölköy
- Gümele
- Güneysaray
- Güvem
- Hıdırlar
- İğdir
- İğmir
- İnceğiz
- İsmetpaşa
- İyceler
- Kalemler
- Karaağaç
- Karacaören
- Karşıyaka
- Kasımlar
- Kavaközü
- Kemalpaşa
- Kınık
- Kırkırca
- Kırköy
- Kışlak
- Kızık
- Kızılcaköy
- Kızılcaören
- Kocalar
- Kurumcu
- Kuşcuören
- Mahkemeağcin
- Oğlakcı
- Olucak
- Örencik
- Ortaköy
- Otacı
- Pazar
- Pazar Başören
- Pazar Kınık
- Şahinler
- Salın
- Saray
- Saraycık
- Sazak
- Semeler
- Semer
- Süleler
- Tahtalar
- Taşlıca
- Turnalı
- Üçbaş
- Uğurlu
- Üyücek
- Yağcıhüseyin
- Yakakaya
- Yanık Özbekler
- Yenice
- Yeşilköy
- Yıldırımçatak
- Yıldırımdemirciler
- Yıldırımhacılar
- Yıldırımören
- Yıldırımyağlıca
- Yukarıada
- Yukarıçanlı
- Yukarıhüyük
- Yukarıkaraören
- Yukarıkese

== Fossil flora ==
Kızılcahamam is also known for its fossil flora which stems from at least six Pliocene deposits in Güvem and Beşkonak villages, 22 kilometres (14 miles) north of Kızılcahamam: Fossil flora of Kızılcahamam district.

== Twin Towns/Sister Cities ==
- Gönyeli, Northern Cyprus
