= List of municipalities in Ankara Province =

This is the List of municipalities in Ankara Province, Turkey as of October 2007.

== Municipalities ==
List is sorted alphabetically A-Z, as Districts->Municipalities.

District	Municipality
Akyurt	Akyurt
Altındağ	Altındağ
Altındağ	Altınova
Ayaş	Ayaş
Ayaş	Çanıllı
Ayaş	Oltan
Ayaş	Sinanlı
Bala	Afşar
Bala	Bala
Bala	Karaali
Bala	Kesikköprü
Beypazarı	Beypazarı
Beypazarı	Karaşar
Beypazarı	Kırbaşı
Beypazarı	Uruş
Çamlıdere	Çamlıdere
Çamlıdere	Peçenek
Çankaya	Çankaya
Çubuk	Çubuk
Çubuk	Esenboğa
Çubuk	Sirkeli
Çubuk	Yukarıçavundur
Elmadağ	Elmadağ
Elmadağ	Hasanoğlan
Elmadağ	Lalahan
Elmadağ	Yeşildere
Etimesgut	Etimesgut
Evren	Evren
Gölbaşı	Bezirhane
Gölbaşı	Gölbaşı
Gölbaşı	Karagedik
Gölbaşı	Selametli
Güdül	Çağa
Güdül	Güdül
Güdül	Sorgun
Güdül	Yeşilöz
Haymana	Balçıkhisar
Haymana	Bumsuz
Haymana	Çalış
Haymana	Haymana
Haymana	Oyaca
Haymana	Yenice
Haymana	Yurtbeyli
Kalecik	Kalecik
Kazan	Kazan
Keçiören	Bağlum
Keçiören	Keçiören
Keçiören	Pursaklar
Keçiören	Saray
Kızılcahamam	Çeltikçi
Kızılcahamam	Kızılcahamam
Mamak	Kutludüğün
Mamak	Mamak
Nallıhan	Çayırhan
Nallıhan	Nallıhan
Nallıhan	Sarıyar
Polatlı	Polatlı
Polatlı	Temelli
Şereflikoçhisar	Çalören
Şereflikoçhisar	Devekovan
Şereflikoçhisar	Gülhüyük
Şereflikoçhisar	Kacarlı
Şereflikoçhisar	Şereflikoçhisar
Sincan	Sincan
Sincan	Yenikent
Yenimahalle	Yenimahalle

== Changes in 2014 ==
According to Law act no. 6360, belde (town) municipalities within provinces with more than 750,000 population (so called Metropolitan municipalities) were abolished as of 30 March 2014. 20 belde municipalities in the above list are now defunct. The list is kept for historical reference.
