= Yaylabeyi, Haymana =

Yaylabeyi
- Neighbourhood
- Location in Turkey Yaylabeyi (Turkey Central Anatolia)
- Coordinates: 39°33′20″N 32°24′25″E
- Country: Turkey
- Province: Ankara
- District: Haymana
- Population (2022): 73
- Time zone: UTC+3 (TRT)

Yaylabeyi is a neighbourhood in the municipality and district of Haymana, Ankara Province, Turkey. Its population is 73 (2022). Its old name was Abdülkerim. The neighbouring settlements are: Turkserefli in the north, Durutlar in the east, Turkhuyuk in the south and Polatlı in the west.

The village is populated by Kurds.

== Population ==
Historical population
Year	Pop.	±% p.a.
1940	81	—
1960	134	+2.55%
1975	165	+1.40%
1990	153	−0.50%
1997	128	−2.52%
2007	120	−0.64%
2012	90	−5.59%
2017	90	+0.00%
2022	73	−4.10%
Source: Population censuses (1940-1997) and TÜIK (2007-2022)
