= Haydarlı =

Haydarlı (literally "lion's place" or "hero's place") is a Turkic word that may refer to:

== Places ==
=== Armenia ===
- Haydarli, Lori, a town in the Lori Province

=== Turkey ===
- Haydarlı, Dinar, a village in the district of Dinar, Afyonkarahisar Province
- Haydarlı, Gölbaşı, a village in the district of Gölbaşı, Adıyaman Province
- Haydarlı, Horasan
- Haydarlı, Koçarlı, a village in the district of Koçarlı, Aydın Province
- Haydarlı, Nazilli, a village in the district of Nazilli, Aydın Province
- Haydarlı, Şereflikoçhisar, a village in the district of Şereflikoçhisar, Ankara Province

== See also ==
- Haydar, root of the word
