= Modan (tribe) =

Kurdish tribe of Turkey and Iran

Modan (Kurdish: Modan) is a Kurdish tribe mainly residing around Haymana, Ankara Province in Turkey. The first Kurdish village and considerable Kurdish presence appeared in the region in 15th and 18th centuries, respectively. Tribal members are also found in Mazandaran Province in northern Iran.

== Geography ==
It is believed that the tribe migrated westward from Mutki region near Bitlis. Today, they live in the villages of Katrancı, Saatli, Karasüleymanlı, Çeltikli and Toyçayırı in the Haymana district of Ankara Province.

== See also ==
- Şêxbizin (tribe)
- Reşwan (tribe)
- Kord Kola
- Kord Kheyl, Juybar
