= Yaprakbayırı, Haymana =

Yaprakbayırı
- Neighbourhood
- Location in Turkey Yaprakbayırı (Turkey Central Anatolia)
- Coordinates: 39°13′N 32°31′E
- Country: Turkey
- Province: Ankara
- District: Haymana
- Population (2022): 268
- Time zone: UTC+3 (TRT)

Yaprakbayırı is a neighbourhood in the municipality and district of Haymana, Ankara Province, Turkey. Its population is 268 (2022).

The village is populated by the Kurdish Şêxbizin tribe.
