= Geçitli =

Geçitli (literally "place with a passage") is a Turkish place name that may refer to the following places in Turkey:

- Geçitli, Ardanuç, a village in the district of Ardanuç, Artvin Province
- Geçitli, Besni, a village in the district of Besni, Adıyaman Province
- Geçitli, Gerger, a village in the district of Gerger, Adıyaman Province
- Geçitli, Sason, a village in the district of Sason, Batman Province
- Geçitli, Sincik, a village in the district of Sincik, Adıyaman Province
- Geçitli, Söğüt, a village in the district of Söğüt, Bilecik Province
- Geçitli, Şereflikoçhisar, a village in the district of Şereflikoçhisar, Ankara Province
- Geçitli, Yüreğir, a village in the district of Yüreğir, Adana Province
