= Baltalin, Haymana =

Baltalin
- Neighbourhood
- Location in Turkey Baltalin (Turkey Central Anatolia)
- Coordinates: 39°14′41″N 32°44′51″E
- Country: Turkey
- Province: Ankara
- District: Haymana
- Population (2022): 129
- Time zone: UTC+3 (TRT)

Baltalin (formerly: Pınarbaşı) is a neighbourhood in the municipality and district of Haymana, Ankara Province, Turkey. Its population is 129 (2022).

The village is populated by the Kurdish Şêxbizin tribe.
