= Altıpınar, Haymana =

Altıpınar
- Neighbourhood
- Location in Turkey Altıpınar (Turkey Central Anatolia)
- Coordinates: 39.203°N 32.749°E
- Country: Turkey
- Province: Ankara
- District: Haymana
- Population (2022): 513
- Time zone: UTC+3 (TRT)

Altıpınar is a neighbourhood in the municipality and district of Haymana, Ankara Province, Turkey. Its population is 513 (2022).

The village is populated by the Kurdish Şêxbizin tribe.
