= Bostanhüyük, Haymana =

Bostanhüyük
- Neighbourhood
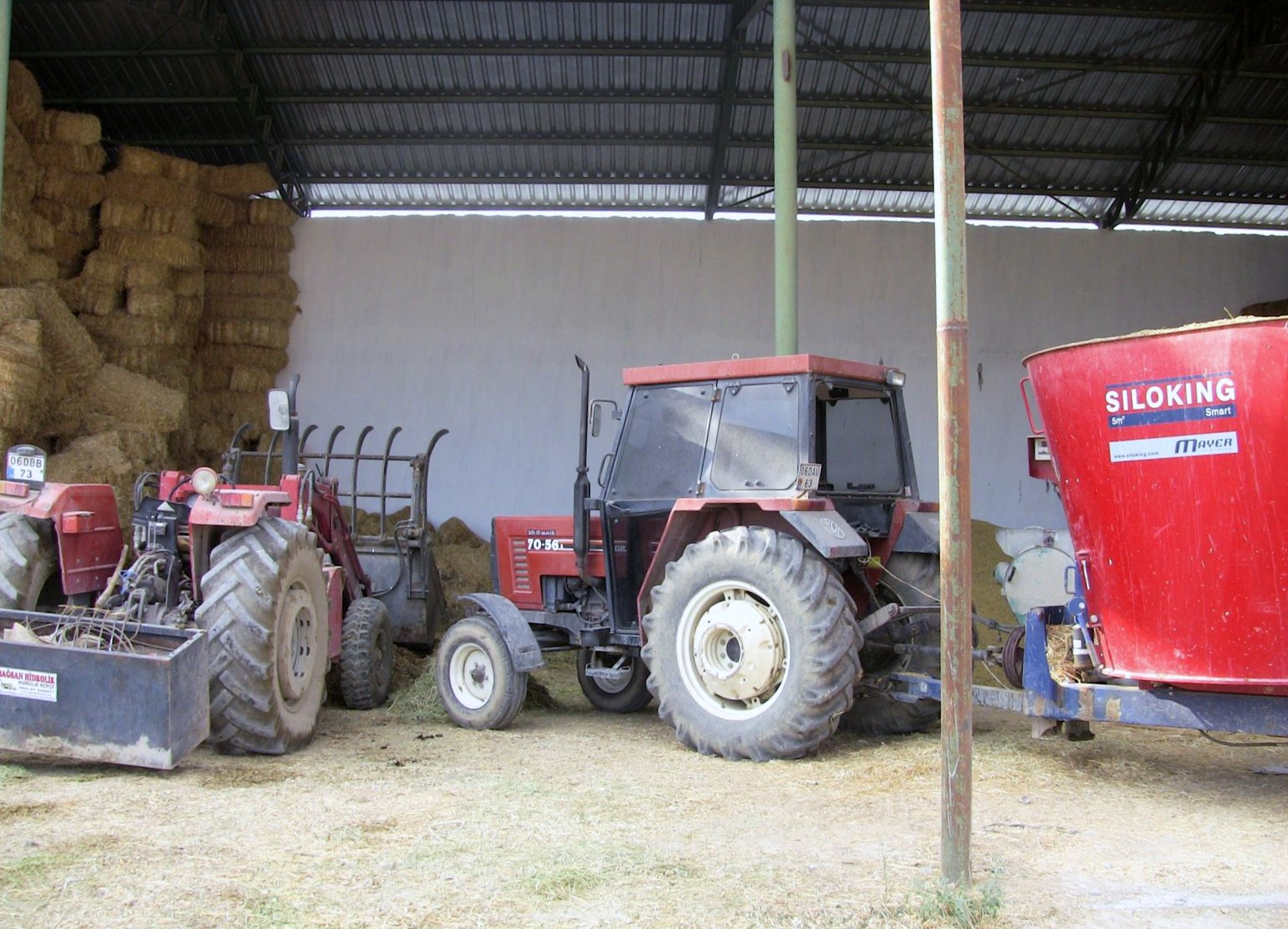

- Location within Turkey Location within Turkey Central Anatolia
- Coordinates: 39°13′N 32°45′E
- Country: Turkey
- Province: Ankara
- District: Haymana
- Population (2022): 194
- Time zone: UTC+3 (TRT)

Bostanhüyük is a neighbourhood in the municipality and district of Haymana, Ankara Province, Turkey. Its population is 194 (2022).

The village is populated by the Kurdish Şêxbizin tribe.
