= Gedik, Haymana =

Gedik
- Neighbourhood
- Location in Turkey Gedik (Turkey Central Anatolia)
- Coordinates: 39°23′34″N 32°26′51″E
- Country: Turkey
- Province: Ankara
- District: Haymana
- Population (2022): 88
- Time zone: UTC+3 (TRT)

Gedik is a neighbourhood in the municipality and district of Haymana, Ankara Province, Turkey. Its population is 88 (2022). It is located approximately 42 miles (67 km) South-West of Ankara, the country's capital.

The village is populated by the Kurdish Şêxbizin tribe.
