= İncirli, Haymana =

İncirli
- Neighbourhood
- Location in Turkey İncirli (Turkey Central Anatolia)
- Coordinates: 39°17′52″N 32°26′33″E
- Country: Turkey
- Province: Ankara
- District: Haymana
- Population (2022): 83
- Time zone: UTC+3 (TRT)

İncirli is a neighbourhood in the municipality and district of Haymana, Ankara Province, Turkey. Its population is 83 (2022).

The village is populated by the Kurdish Şêxbizin tribe.
