= Bahçecik, Haymana =

Bahçecik
- Neighbourhood
- Location in Turkey Bahçecik (Turkey Central Anatolia)
- Coordinates: 39.2608°N 32.4426°E
- Country: Turkey
- Province: Ankara
- District: Haymana
- Population (2022): 295
- Time zone: UTC+3 (TRT)

Bahçecik is a neighbourhood in the municipality and district of Haymana, Ankara Province, Turkey. Its population is 295 (2022).

The village is populated by the Kurdish Şêxbizin tribe.
