= Kavakköy, Haymana =

Kavakköy
- Neighbourhood
- Location in Turkey Kavakköy (Turkey Central Anatolia)
- Coordinates: 39.3103°N 32.3207°E
- Country: Turkey
- Province: Ankara
- District: Haymana
- Population (2022): 240
- Time zone: UTC+3 (TRT)

Kavakköy is a neighbourhood in the municipality and district of Haymana, Ankara Province, Turkey. Its population is 240 (2022).

The village is populated by the Kurdish Şêxbizin tribe.
