= Yamak (disambiguation) =

- Yamaks, category of Ottoman military
- Spelling variant of Yemek, Turkic tribe
- Meryem Yamak
- Kemal Yamak
- Yamak, Haymana
