= Tabaklı, Haymana =

Tabaklı
- Neighbourhood
- Location in Turkey Tabaklı (Turkey Central Anatolia)
- Coordinates: 39.3558°N 32.4125°E
- Country: Turkey
- Province: Ankara
- District: Haymana
- Population (2022): 89
- Time zone: UTC+3 (TRT)

Tabaklı is a neighbourhood in the municipality and district of Haymana, Ankara Province, Turkey. Its population is 89 (2022).

The village is populated by the Kurdish Şêxbizin tribe.
