= Ataköy, Haymana =

Ataköy
- Neighbourhood
- Location in Turkey Ataköy (Turkey Central Anatolia)
- Coordinates: 39.2734°N 32.5186°E
- Country: Turkey
- Province: Ankara
- District: Haymana
- Population (2022): 587
- Time zone: UTC+3 (TRT)

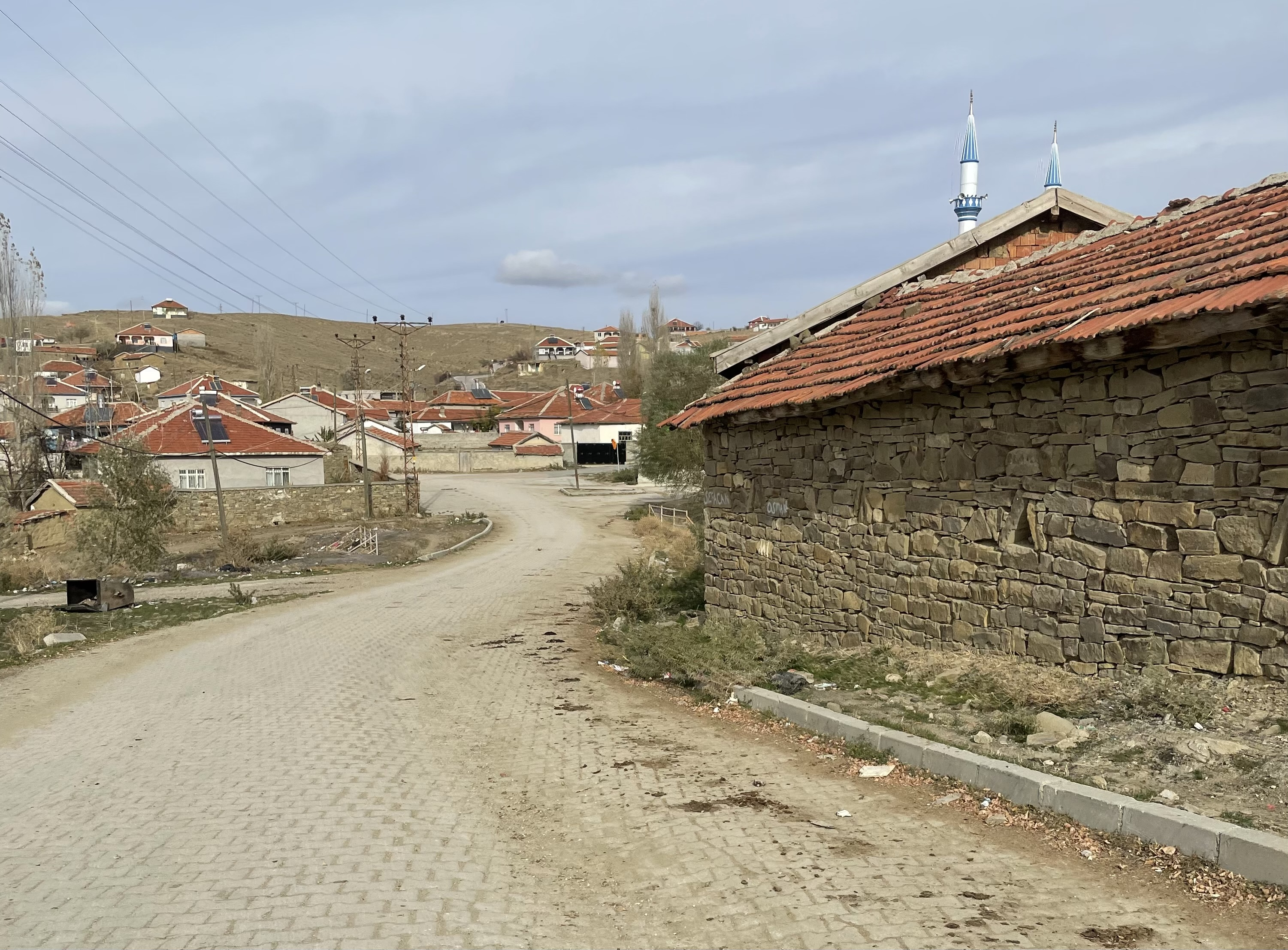

Ataköy (formerly: Kaltakli) is a neighbourhood in the municipality and district of Haymana, Ankara Province, Turkey. Its population is 587 (2022).

The village is populated by the Kurdish Şêxbizin tribe.
