= Alaçık, Haymana =

Alaçık
- Neighbourhood
- Location in Turkey Alaçık (Turkey Central Anatolia)
- Coordinates: 39.2945°N 32.4270°E
- Country: Turkey
- Province: Ankara
- District: Haymana
- Population (2022): 149
- Time zone: UTC+3 (TRT)

Alaçık (formerly: Aktepe) is a neighbourhood in the municipality and district of Haymana, Ankara Province, Turkey. Its population is 149 (2022).

The village is populated by the Kurdish Şêxbizin tribe.
