= Mandıra, Haymana =

Mandıra
- Neighbourhood
- Location in Turkey Mandıra (Turkey Central Anatolia)
- Coordinates: 39.5276°N 32.5162°E
- Country: Turkey
- Province: Ankara
- District: Haymana
- Population (2022): 204
- Time zone: UTC+3 (TRT)

Mandıra (formerly: Karaömerli) is a neighbourhood in the municipality and district of Haymana, Ankara Province, Turkey. Its population is 204 (2022).

The village is populated by the Kurdish Şêxbizin tribe.
