= Evliyafakı, Haymana =

Evliyafakı
- Neighbourhood
- Location in Turkey Evliyafakı (Turkey Central Anatolia)
- Coordinates: 39°19′N 32°21′E
- Country: Turkey
- Province: Ankara
- District: Haymana
- Population (2022): 210
- Time zone: UTC+3 (TRT)

Evliyafakı is a neighbourhood in the municipality and district of Haymana, Ankara Province, Turkey. Its population is 210 (2022).

The village is populated by the Kurdish Şêxbizin tribe.
