= Eskikışla, Haymana =

Eskikışla
- Neighbourhood
- Location in Turkey Eskikışla (Turkey Central Anatolia)
- Coordinates: 39.3103°N 32.4825°E
- Country: Turkey
- Province: Ankara
- District: Haymana
- Population (2022): 142
- Time zone: UTC+3 (TRT)

Eskikışla is a neighbourhood in the municipality and district of Haymana, Ankara Province, Turkey. Its population is 142 (2022).

The village is populated by the Kurdish Şêxbizin tribe.
