= Çatalören =

Çatalören can refer to:

- Çatalören, Bala
- Çatalören, Erzincan
- Çatalören, Karayazı
