= Sinanlı, Haymana =

Sinanlı
- Neighbourhood
- Location in Turkey Sinanlı (Turkey Central Anatolia)
- Coordinates: 39.1708°N 32.6189°E
- Country: Turkey
- Province: Ankara
- District: Haymana
- Population (2022): 604
- Time zone: UTC+3 (TRT)

Sinanlı is a neighbourhood in the municipality and district of Haymana, Ankara Province, Turkey. Its population is 604 (2022).

The village is populated by the Kurdish Şêxbizin tribe.
