= Gültepe, Haymana =

Gültepe
- Neighbourhood
- Location in Turkey Gültepe (Turkey Central Anatolia)
- Coordinates: 39.2956°N 32.4806°E
- Country: Turkey
- Province: Ankara
- District: Haymana
- Population (2022): 405
- Time zone: UTC+3 (TRT)

Gültepe, formerly Gedikli, is a neighbourhood in the municipality and district of Haymana, Ankara Province, Turkey. Its population is 405 (2022).

The village is populated by the Kurdish Şêxbizin tribe.
