= Karapınar, Haymana =

Karapınar
- Neighbourhood
- Location in Turkey Karapınar (Turkey Central Anatolia)
- Coordinates: 39.3011°N 32.4044°E
- Country: Turkey
- Province: Ankara
- District: Haymana
- Population (2022): 187
- Time zone: UTC+3 (TRT)

Karapınar is a neighbourhood in the municipality and district of Haymana, Ankara Province, Turkey. Its population is 187 (2022).

The village is populated by the Kurdish Şêxbizin tribe.
