= Köseli =

Köseli can refer to the following villages in Turkey:

- Köseli, Bala
- Köseli, Bismil
- Köseli, Cide
- Köseli, Kozan
- Köseli, Tut
