= Dereköy, Haymana =

Dereköy
- Neighbourhood
- Location in Turkey Dereköy (Turkey Central Anatolia)
- Coordinates: 39.5147°N 32.5698°E
- Country: Turkey
- Province: Ankara
- District: Haymana
- Population (2022): 208
- Time zone: UTC+3 (TRT)

Dereköy is a neighbourhood in the municipality and district of Haymana, Ankara Province, Turkey. Its population is 208 (2022).

The village is populated by the Kurdish Şêxbizin tribe.
