= Yeşilköy, Haymana =

Yeşilköy
- Neighbourhood
- Location in Turkey Yeşilköy (Turkey Central Anatolia)
- Coordinates: 39.1454°N 32.7517°E
- Country: Turkey
- Province: Ankara
- District: Haymana
- Population (2022): 312
- Time zone: UTC+3 (TRT)

Yeşilköy is a neighbourhood in the municipality and district of Haymana, Ankara Province, Turkey. Its population is 312 (2022).

The village is populated by the Kurdish Şêxbizin tribe.
