= Sarıgöl, Haymana =

Sarıgöl
- Neighbourhood
- Location in Turkey Sarıgöl (Turkey Central Anatolia)
- Coordinates: 39.5289°N 32.4809°E
- Country: Turkey
- Province: Ankara
- District: Haymana
- Population (2022): 263
- Time zone: UTC+3 (TRT)

Sarıgöl is a neighbourhood in the municipality and district of Haymana, Ankara Province, Turkey. Its population is 263 (2022).

The village is populated by the Kurdish Şêxbizin tribe.
