= Yukarısebil, Haymana =

Yukarısebil
- Neighbourhood
- Location in Turkey Yukarısebil (Turkey Central Anatolia)
- Coordinates: 39°10′N 32°44′E
- Country: Turkey
- Province: Ankara
- District: Haymana
- Population (2022): 336
- Time zone: UTC+3 (TRT)

Yukarısebil is a neighbourhood in the municipality and district of Haymana, Ankara Province, Turkey. Its population is 336 (2022).

The village is populated by the Kurdish Şêxbizin tribe.
