= Söğüttepe, Haymana =

Söğüttepe
- Neighbourhood
- Location in Turkey Söğüttepe (Turkey Central Anatolia)
- Coordinates: 39.3611°N 32.4404°E
- Country: Turkey
- Province: Ankara
- District: Haymana
- Population (2022): 68
- Time zone: UTC+3 (TRT)

Söğüttepe is a neighbourhood in the municipality and district of Haymana, Ankara Province, Turkey. Its population is 68 (2022).

The village is populated by the Kurdish Şêxbizin tribe.
