= Hamzalı =

Hamzalı can refer to:

- Hamzalı, Karakoçan
- Hamzalı, Kulp
- Hamzalı, Orhangazi
- Hamzalı, Şereflikoçhisar
- Hamzalı, Yumurtalık
