= Streptomyces seymenliensis =

Scientific classification
- Domain: Bacteria
- Kingdom: Bacillati
- Phylum: Actinomycetota
- Class: Actinomycetia
- Order: Streptomycetales
- Family: Streptomycetaceae
- Genus: Streptomyces
- Species: S. seymenliensis

Binomial name
- Streptomyces seymenliensis Tatar and Sahin 2015

Type strain
- DSM 42117, KCTC 29245, B1041

Species of bacterium

Streptomyces seymenliensis is a bacterium species from the genus of Streptomyces which has been isolated from the Tuz Lake in the Seymenli in Turkey.

== See also ==
- List of Streptomyces species
