= Sazağası, Haymana =

Sazağası
- Neighbourhood
- Location in Turkey Sazağası (Turkey Central Anatolia)
- Coordinates: 39°11′N 32°45′E
- Country: Turkey
- Province: Ankara
- District: Haymana
- Population (2022): 112
- Time zone: UTC+3 (TRT)

Sazağası is a neighbourhood in the municipality and district of Haymana, Ankara Province, Turkey. Its population is 112 (2022).

The village is populated by the Kurdish Şêxbizin tribe.
