= Erdemli (disambiguation) =

Erdemli is a town and district in Mersin Province, Turkey.

Erdemli may also refer to:

- Erdemli, Bala, a neighbourhood in Ankara Province, Turkey
- Erdemli, Bingöl, a village in Bingöl Province, Turkey
- Erdemli, Düzce, a village in Düzce Province, Turkey
