= Evci, Haymana =

Evci
- Neighbourhood
- Location in Turkey Evci (Turkey Central Anatolia)
- Coordinates: 39.3797°N 32.4533°E
- Country: Turkey
- Province: Ankara
- District: Haymana
- Population (2022): 106
- Time zone: UTC+3 (TRT)

Evci is a neighbourhood in the municipality and district of Haymana, Ankara Province, Turkey. Its population is 106 (2022).

The village is populated by the Kurdish Şêxbizin tribe.
