= Kadıncık, Şereflikoçhisar =

Kadıncık
- Neighbourhood
- Location in Turkey Kadıncık (Turkey Central Anatolia)
- Coordinates: 39.018°N 33.607°E
- Country: Turkey
- Province: Ankara
- District: Şereflikoçhisar
- Population (2022): 94
- Time zone: UTC+3 (TRT)

Kadıncık is a neighbourhood in the municipality and district of Şereflikoçhisar, Ankara Province, Turkey. Its population is 94 (2022).
