= Hanburun, Bala =

Hanburun
- Neighbourhood
- Location in Turkey Hanburun (Turkey Central Anatolia)
- Coordinates: 39°22′N 33°01′E
- Country: Turkey
- Province: Ankara
- District: Bala
- Population (2022): 78
- Time zone: UTC+3 (TRT)

Hanburun is a neighbourhood in the municipality and district of Bala, Ankara Province, Turkey. Its population is 78 (2022). The village is populated by Kurds.
