= Şanlıkışla, Şereflikoçhisar =

Şanlıkışla
- Neighbourhood
- Location in Turkey Şanlıkışla (Turkey Central Anatolia)
- Coordinates: 39°10′N 33°27′E
- Country: Turkey
- Province: Ankara
- District: Şereflikoçhisar
- Population (2022): 290
- Time zone: UTC+3 (TRT)

Şanlıkışla is a neighbourhood in the municipality and district of Şereflikoçhisar, Ankara Province, Turkey. Its population is 290 (2022). The village is populated by Kurds.
