= Odunboğazı, Şereflikoçhisar =

Odunboğazı
- Neighbourhood
- Location in Turkey Odunboğazı (Turkey Central Anatolia)
- Coordinates: 39°15′N 33°18′E
- Country: Turkey
- Province: Ankara
- District: Şereflikoçhisar
- Population (2022): 63
- Time zone: UTC+3 (TRT)

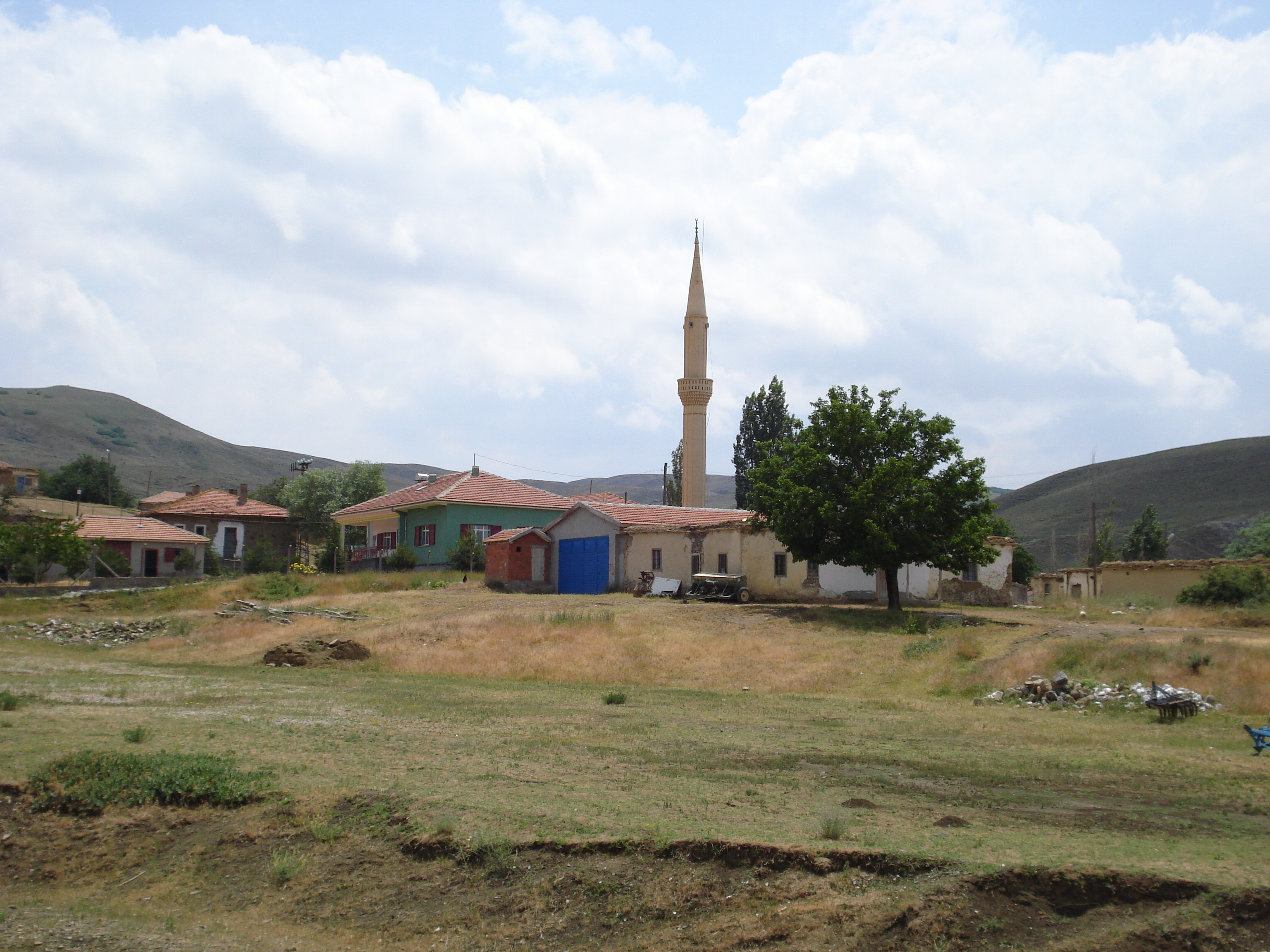

Odunboğazı is a neighbourhood in the municipality and district of Şereflikoçhisar, Ankara Province, Turkey. Its population is 63 (2022). The village is populated by Kurds.
