= Güzelcekale, Haymana =

Güzelcekale
- Neighbourhood
- Location in Turkey Güzelcekale (Turkey Central Anatolia)
- Coordinates: 39°19′N 32°44′E
- Country: Turkey
- Province: Ankara
- District: Haymana
- Population (2022): 199
- Time zone: UTC+3 (TRT)

Güzelcekale is a neighbourhood in the municipality and district of Haymana, Ankara Province, Turkey. Its population is 199 (2022).
