= Baltalı, Şereflikoçhisar =

Baltalı
- Neighbourhood
- Location in Turkey Baltalı (Turkey Central Anatolia)
- Coordinates: 38.8291°N 33.7150°E
- Country: Turkey
- Province: Ankara
- District: Şereflikoçhisar
- Population (2022): 37
- Time zone: UTC+3 (TRT)

Baltalı is a neighbourhood in the municipality and district of Şereflikoçhisar, Ankara Province, Turkey. Its population is 37 (2022).
