= Sırçasaray, Haymana =

Sırçasaray
- Neighbourhood
- Location in Turkey Sırçasaray (Turkey Central Anatolia)
- Coordinates: 39°09′N 32°23′E
- Country: Turkey
- Province: Ankara
- District: Haymana
- Population (2022): 144
- Time zone: UTC+3 (TRT)

Sırçasaray is a neighbourhood in the municipality and district of Haymana, Ankara Province, Turkey. Its population is 144 (2022).

The village is populated by Kurds.
