= Yazısöğüt, Şereflikoçhisar =

Yazısöğüt
- Neighbourhood
- Location in Turkey Yazısöğüt (Turkey Central Anatolia)
- Coordinates: 39°04′43″N 33°35′07″E
- Country: Turkey
- Province: Ankara
- District: Şereflikoçhisar
- Population (2022): 48
- Time zone: UTC+3 (TRT)

Yazısöğüt is a neighbourhood in the municipality and district of Şereflikoçhisar, Ankara Province, Turkey. Its population is 48 (2022).
