= Küçükkonak, Haymana =

Küçükkonak
- Neighbourhood
- Location in Turkey Küçükkonak (Turkey Central Anatolia)
- Coordinates: 39°11′N 32°23′E
- Country: Turkey
- Province: Ankara
- District: Haymana
- Population (2022): 35
- Time zone: UTC+3 (TRT)

Küçükkonak (formerly: Küçükkonakgörmez) is a neighbourhood in the municipality and district of Haymana, Ankara Province, Turkey. Its population is 35 (2022).

The village is populated by Kurds.
