= Eley, Şereflikoçhisar =

Eley
- Neighbourhood
- Location in Turkey Eley (Turkey Central Anatolia)
- Coordinates: 38°51′N 33°45′E
- Country: Turkey
- Province: Ankara
- District: Şereflikoçhisar
- Population (2022): 65
- Time zone: UTC+3 (TRT)

Eley is a neighbourhood in the municipality and district of Şereflikoçhisar, Ankara Province, Turkey. Its population is 65 (2022).
