= Aşıkoğlu, Bala =

Aşıkoğlu
- Neighbourhood
- Location in Turkey Aşıkoğlu (Turkey Central Anatolia)
- Coordinates: 39°35′N 33°09′E
- Country: Turkey
- Province: Ankara
- District: Bala
- Population (2022): 103
- Time zone: UTC+3 (TRT)

Aşıkoğlu is a neighbourhood in the municipality and district of Bala, Ankara Province, Turkey. Its population is 103 (2022).
