= Karasüleymanlı, Haymana =

Karasüleymanlı
- Neighbourhood
- Location in Turkey Karasüleymanlı (Turkey Central Anatolia)
- Coordinates: 39.3544°N 32.6111°E
- Country: Turkey
- Province: Ankara
- District: Haymana
- Population (2022): 209
- Time zone: UTC+3 (TRT)

Karasüleymanlı is a neighbourhood in the municipality and district of Haymana, Ankara Province, Turkey. Its population is 209 (2022).

The village is populated by the Kurdish Modan tribe.
