= Bahçekaradalak, Bala =

Bahçekaradalak
- Neighbourhood
- Location in Turkey Bahçekaradalak (Turkey Central Anatolia)
- Coordinates: 39°30′N 33°11′E
- Country: Turkey
- Province: Ankara
- District: Bala
- Population (2022): 319
- Time zone: UTC+3 (TRT)

Bahçekaradalak is a neighbourhood in the municipality and district of Bala, Ankara Province, Turkey. Its population is 319 (2022).
