= Çatçat, Şereflikoçhisar =

Çatçat
- Neighbourhood
- Location in Turkey Çatçat (Turkey Central Anatolia)
- Coordinates: 38°55′N 33°44′E
- Country: Turkey
- Province: Ankara
- District: Şereflikoçhisar
- Population (2022): 15
- Time zone: UTC+3 (TRT)

Çatçat (Turkish: [tʃatˈtʃat]) is a neighbourhood in the municipality and district of Şereflikoçhisar, Ankara Province, Turkey. Its population is 15 (2022).
