= Bektaşlı, Bala =

Bektaşlı
- Neighbourhood
- Country: Turkey
- Province: Ankara
- District: Bala
- Population (2022): 210
- Time zone: UTC+3 (TRT)

Bektaşlı is a neighbourhood in the municipality and district of Bala, Ankara Province, Turkey. Its population is 210 (2022). Bektaşlı has an elevation of 887 metres. Bektaşlı is situated northwest of Küçükbıyık, and southeast of Büyükcamili.

The village was founded by the Bektaşi sect of Islam. The village is populated by Kurds.
