= Abazlı, Bala =

Abazlı
- Neighbourhood
- Location in Turkey Abazlı (Turkey Central Anatolia)
- Coordinates: 39°33′N 33°01′E
- Country: Turkey
- Province: Ankara
- District: Bala
- Population (2022): 728
- Time zone: UTC+3 (TRT)

Abazlı is a neighbourhood in the municipality and district of Bala, Ankara Province, Turkey. Its population is 728 (2022).
