= Büyükbayat, Bala =

Büyükbayat
- Neighbourhood
- Location in Turkey Büyükbayat (Turkey Central Anatolia)
- Coordinates: 39.6494°N 33.2683°E
- Country: Turkey
- Province: Ankara
- District: Bala
- Population (2022): 694
- Time zone: UTC+3 (TRT)

Büyükbayat (formerly: Keklicek) is a neighbourhood in the municipality and district of Bala, Ankara Province, Turkey. Its population is 694 (2022).
