= Çeltikli, Haymana =

Çeltikli
- Neighbourhood
- Location in Turkey Çeltikli (Turkey Central Anatolia)
- Coordinates: 39.2075°N 32.6442°E
- Country: Turkey
- Province: Ankara
- District: Haymana
- Population (2022): 233
- Time zone: UTC+3 (TRT)

Çeltikli is a neighbourhood in the municipality and district of Haymana, Ankara Province, Turkey. Its population is 233 (2022).

The village is populated by the Kurdish Modan tribe.
