= Çayraz, Haymana =

Çayraz
- Neighbourhood
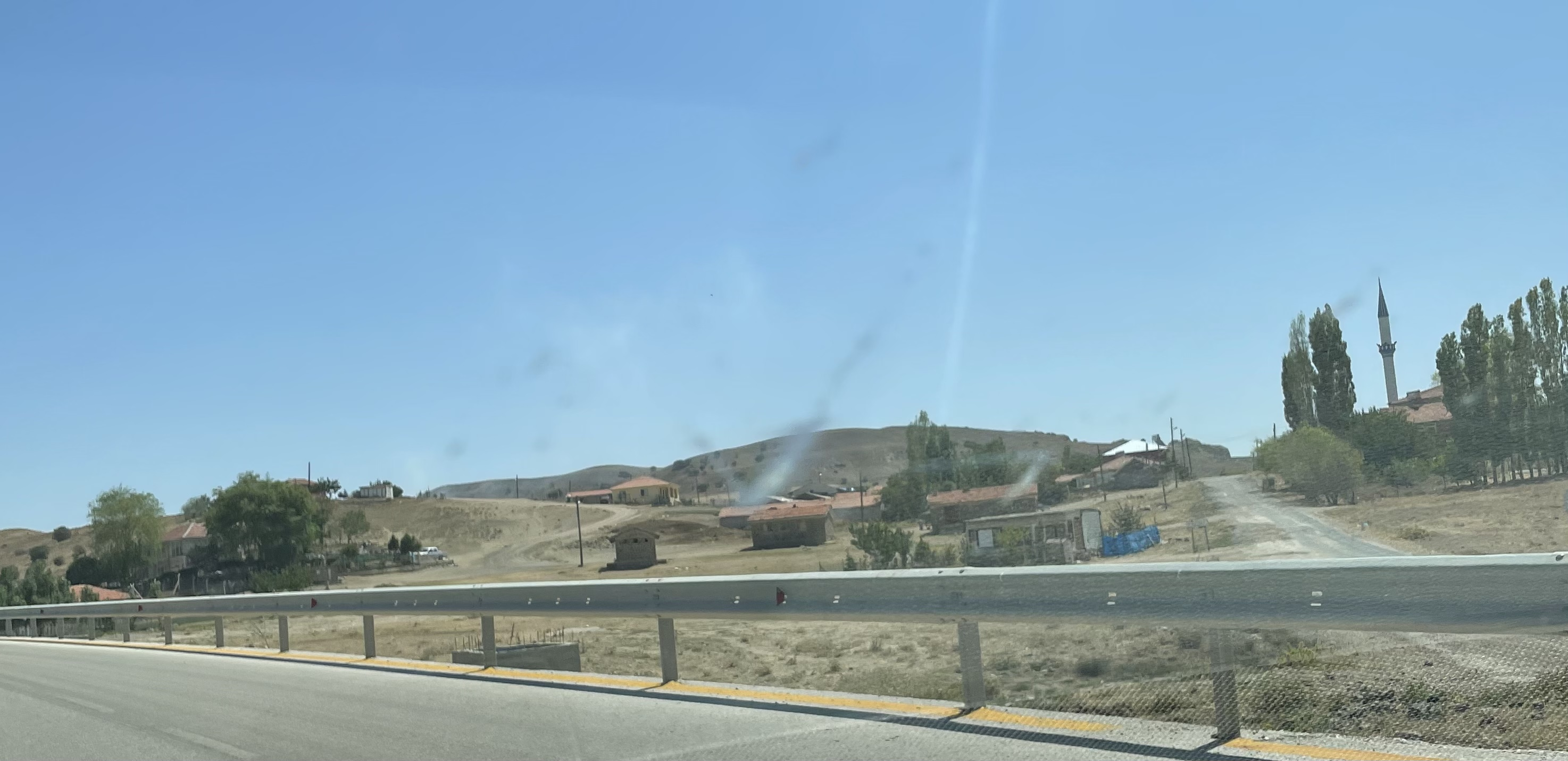

- Location within Turkey Location within Turkey Central Anatolia
- Coordinates: 39.4736°N 32.5475°E
- Country: Turkey
- Province: Ankara
- District: Haymana
- Population (2022): 149
- Time zone: UTC+3 (TRT)

Çayraz is a neighbourhood in the municipality and district of Haymana, Ankara Province, Turkey. Its population is 149 (2022).

== Geography ==
It is 65 km to Ankara province and 8 km to Haymana district. The neighborhood is mostly mountainous. It has continental climate characteristics as climate.
