= Üçem, Bala =

Üçem
- Neighbourhood
- Location in Turkey Üçem (Turkey Central Anatolia)
- Coordinates: 39°34′N 33°13′E
- Country: Turkey
- Province: Ankara
- District: Bala
- Population (2022): 330
- Time zone: UTC+3 (TRT)

Üçem is a neighbourhood in the municipality and district of Bala, Ankara Province, Turkey. Its population is 330 (2022).
