= Soğulca, Haymana =

Soğulca
- Neighbourhood
- Location in Turkey Soğulca (Turkey Central Anatolia)
- Coordinates: 39°22′N 32°21′E
- Country: Turkey
- Province: Ankara
- District: Haymana
- Population (2022): 148
- Time zone: UTC+3 (TRT)

Soğulca is a neighbourhood in the municipality and district of Haymana, Ankara Province, Turkey. Its population is 148 (2022).

The village is populated by Kurds.
