= Yalnızpınar, Şereflikoçhisar =

Yalnızpınar
- Neighbourhood
- Location in Turkey Yalnızpınar (Turkey Central Anatolia)
- Coordinates: 38°50′38″N 33°46′02″E
- Country: Turkey
- Province: Ankara
- District: Şereflikoçhisar
- Population (2022): 115
- Time zone: UTC+3 (TRT)

Yalnızpınar is a neighbourhood in the municipality and district of Şereflikoçhisar, Ankara Province, Turkey. Its population is 115 (2022).
