= Çavuşköy, Şereflikoçhisar =

Çavuşköy
- Neighbourhood
- Location in Turkey Çavuşköy (Turkey Central Anatolia)
- Coordinates: 38.8582°N 33.4821°E
- Country: Turkey
- Province: Ankara
- District: Şereflikoçhisar
- Population (2022): 92
- Time zone: UTC+3 (TRT)

Çavuşköy is a neighbourhood in the municipality and district of Şereflikoçhisar, Ankara Province, Turkey. Its population is 92 (2022).
