= Yukarıhacıbekir, Bala =

Yukarıhacıbekir
- Neighbourhood
- Location in Turkey Yukarıhacıbekir (Turkey Central Anatolia)
- Coordinates: 39°20′N 33°16′E
- Country: Turkey
- Province: Ankara
- District: Bala
- Population (2022): 128
- Time zone: UTC+3 (TRT)

Yukarıhacıbekir is a neighbourhood in the municipality and district of Bala, Ankara Province, Turkey. Its population is 128 (2022).

The village is populated by Kurds.
