= Yeniköy, Haymana =

Yeniköy
- Neighbourhood
- Location in Turkey Yeniköy (Turkey Central Anatolia)
- Coordinates: 39.4597°N 32.5819°E
- Country: Turkey
- Province: Ankara
- District: Haymana
- Population (2022): 206
- Time zone: UTC+3 (TRT)

Yeniköy is a neighbourhood in the municipality and district of Haymana, Ankara Province, Turkey. Its population is 206 (2022).
