= Kadıköy, Haymana =

Kadıköy
- Neighbourhood
- Location in Turkey Kadıköy (Turkey Central Anatolia)
- Coordinates: 39°28′20″N 32°28′59″E
- Country: Turkey
- Province: Ankara
- District: Haymana
- Population (2022): 317
- Time zone: UTC+3 (TRT)

Kadıköy (formerly: Yeşilyurt) is a neighbourhood in the municipality and district of Haymana, Ankara Province, Turkey. Its population is 317 (2022).
