= Sındıran, Haymana =

Sındıran
- Neighbourhood
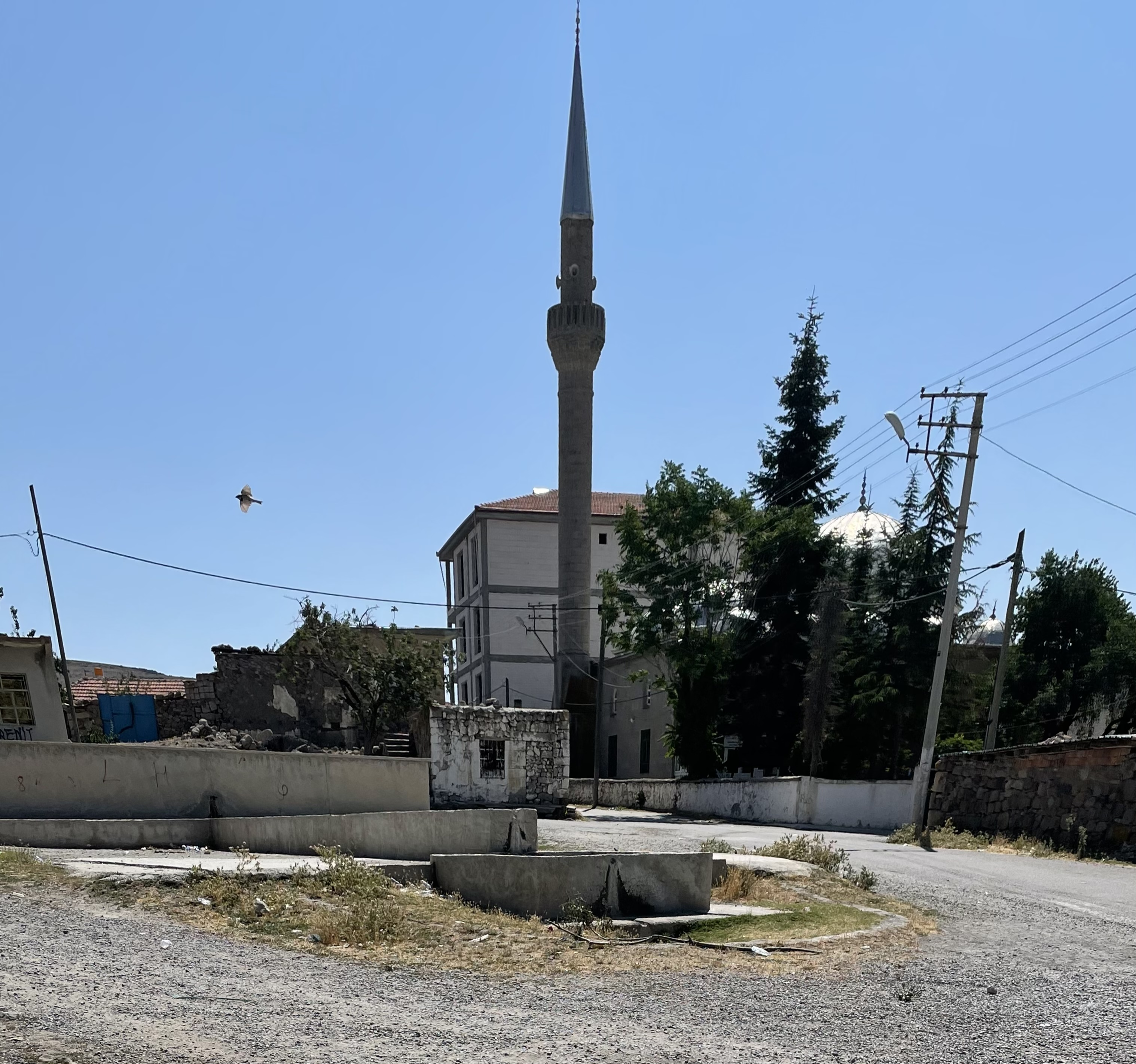
- Sındıran Mosque

- Location within Turkey Location within Turkey Central Anatolia
- Coordinates: 39.2761°N 32.6792°E
- Country: Turkey
- Province: Ankara
- District: Haymana
- Population (2022): 1,778
- Time zone: UTC+3 (TRT)

Sındıran (formerly Yenice) is a rural neighbourhood (mahalle) in the municipality and district of Haymana, Ankara Province, Turkey. Its population is 1,778 (2022). Before the 2013 reorganisation, it was a town (belde).

The town is populated by Şêxbızın Kurds.
