= Sırapınar, Bala =

Sırapınar
- Neighbourhood
- Location in Turkey Sırapınar (Turkey Central Anatolia)
- Coordinates: 39.4583°N 33.2161°E
- Country: Turkey
- Province: Ankara
- District: Bala
- Population (2022): 438
- Time zone: UTC+3 (TRT)

Sırapınar is a neighbourhood in the municipality and district of Bala, Ankara Province, Turkey. Its population is 438 (2022).
