= Büyükcamili, Bala =

Büyükcamili
- Neighbourhood
- Country: Turkey
- Province: Ankara
- District: Bala
- Population (2022): 389
- Time zone: UTC+3 (TRT)

Büyükcamili is a neighbourhood in the municipality and district of Bala, Ankara Province, Turkey. Its population is 389 (2022). The village is populated by Kurds.
