= Sofular, Bala =

Sofular
- Neighbourhood
- Location in Turkey Sofular (Turkey Central Anatolia)
- Coordinates: 39.3014°N 33.0934°E
- Country: Turkey
- Province: Ankara
- District: Bala
- Population (2022): 605
- Time zone: UTC+3 (TRT)

Sofular is a neighbourhood in the municipality and district of Bala, Ankara Province, Turkey. Its population is 605 (2022).
