= Durutlar, Haymana =

Durutlar
- Neighbourhood
- Location in Turkey Durutlar (Turkey Central Anatolia)
- Coordinates: 39°32′N 32°27′E
- Country: Turkey
- Province: Ankara
- District: Haymana
- Population (2022): 96
- Time zone: UTC+3 (TRT)

Durutlar is a neighbourhood in the municipality and district of Haymana, Ankara Province, Turkey. Its population is 96 (2022).

The village is populated by the Kurdish Şêxbizin tribe.
