= Acıöz, Şereflikoçhisar =

Acıöz
- Neighbourhood
- Location in Turkey Acıöz (Turkey Central Anatolia)
- Coordinates: 39.1790°N 33.3819°E
- Country: Turkey
- Province: Ankara
- District: Şereflikoçhisar
- Population (2022): 56
- Time zone: UTC+3 (TRT)

Acıöz is a neighbourhood in the municipality and district of Şereflikoçhisar, Ankara Province, Turkey. Its population is 56 (2022). It used to be considered as a village before 2013 Turkish local government reorganisation.

== Demographics ==
Historical population
Year	Pop.	±% p.a.
1965	207	—
1970	229	+2.04%
1975	125	−11.40%
1980	117	−1.31%
1985	134	+2.75%
1990	104	−4.94%
2000	43	−8.45%
2007	41	−0.68%
2012	36	−2.57%
2017	33	−1.73%
2022	56	+11.16%
Source: TÜIK (2007-2022)
