= Cingirli, Haymana =

Cingirli
- Neighbourhood
- Location in Turkey Cingirli (Turkey Central Anatolia)
- Coordinates: 39°26′N 32°38′E
- Country: Turkey
- Province: Ankara
- District: Haymana
- Population (2022): 16
- Time zone: UTC+3 (TRT)

Cingirli is a neighbourhood in the municipality and district of Haymana, Ankara Province, Turkey. Its population is 16 (2022).
