= Ergin, Bala =

Ergin
- Neighbourhood
- Location in Turkey Ergin (Turkey Central Anatolia)
- Coordinates: 39.6442°N 33.1570°E
- Country: Turkey
- Province: Ankara
- District: Bala
- Population (2022): 418
- Time zone: UTC+3 (TRT)

Ergin is a neighbourhood in the municipality and district of Bala, Ankara Province, Turkey. Its population is 418 (2022).

The village is populated by Kurds.
