= Yeniyapançarşak, Bala =

Yeniyapançarşak
- Neighbourhood
- Location in Turkey Yeniyapançarşak (Turkey Central Anatolia)
- Coordinates: 39°23′N 32°58′E
- Country: Turkey
- Province: Ankara
- District: Bala
- Population (2022): 273
- Time zone: UTC+3 (TRT)

Yeniyapançarşak is a neighbourhood in the municipality and district of Bala, Ankara Province, Turkey. Its population is 273 (2022).
