= Boğazkaya, Haymana =

Boğazkaya
- Neighbourhood
- Location in Turkey Boğazkaya (Turkey Central Anatolia)
- Coordinates: 39.1053°N 32.4356°E
- Country: Turkey
- Province: Ankara
- District: Haymana
- Population (2022): 59
- Time zone: UTC+3 (TRT)

Boğazkaya is a neighbourhood in the municipality and district of Haymana, Ankara Province, Turkey. Its population is 59 (2022).

The village is populated by Kurds.
