= Fadıllı, Şereflikoçhisar =

Fadıllı
- Neighbourhood
- Location in Turkey Fadıllı (Turkey Central Anatolia)
- Coordinates: 38°55′29″N 33°39′39″E
- Country: Turkey
- Province: Ankara
- District: Şereflikoçhisar
- Population (2022): 94
- Time zone: UTC+3 (TRT)

Fadıllı is a neighbourhood in the municipality and district of Şereflikoçhisar, Ankara Province, Turkey. Its population is 94 (2022).
