= Tepeköy, Haymana =

Tepeköy
- Neighbourhood
- Location in Turkey Tepeköy (Turkey Central Anatolia)
- Coordinates: 39.0847°N 32.4992°E
- Country: Turkey
- Province: Ankara
- District: Haymana
- Population (2022): 258
- Time zone: UTC+3 (TRT)

Tepeköy is a neighbourhood in the municipality and district of Haymana, Ankara Province, Turkey. Its population is 258 (2022).

The village is populated by Kurds.
