= Karahamzalı, Bala =

Karahamzalı
- Neighbourhood
- Location in Turkey Karahamzalı (Turkey Central Anatolia)
- Coordinates: 39.2244°N 33.0344°E
- Country: Turkey
- Province: Ankara
- District: Bala
- Population (2022): 536
- Time zone: UTC+3 (TRT)

Karahamzalı is a neighbourhood in the municipality and district of Bala, Ankara Province, Turkey. Its population is 536 (2022).
