= Kadıobası, Şereflikoçhisar =

Kadıobası
- Neighbourhood
- Location in Turkey Kadıobası (Turkey Central Anatolia)
- Coordinates: 38.900°N 33.710°E
- Country: Turkey
- Province: Ankara
- District: Şereflikoçhisar
- Population (2022): 50
- Time zone: UTC+3 (TRT)

Kadıobası is a neighbourhood in the municipality and district of Şereflikoçhisar, Ankara Province, Turkey. Its population is 50 (2022).
