= Aşağıhacıbekir, Bala =

Aşağıhacıbekir
- Neighbourhood
- Location in Turkey Aşağıhacıbekir (Turkey Central Anatolia)
- Coordinates: 39°24′N 33°17′E
- Country: Turkey
- Province: Ankara
- District: Bala
- Population (2022): 251
- Time zone: UTC+3 (TRT)

Aşağıhacıbekir is a neighbourhood in the municipality and district of Bala, Ankara Province, Turkey. Its population is 251 (2022).

The village is populated by Kurds.
