= Hacıbektaşlı, Şereflikoçhisar =

Hacıbektaşlı
- Neighbourhood
- Location in Turkey Hacıbektaşlı (Turkey Central Anatolia)
- Coordinates: 39°3′31″N 33°30′37″E
- Country: Turkey
- Province: Ankara
- District: Şereflikoçhisar
- Population (2022): 61
- Time zone: UTC+3 (TRT)

Hacıbektaşlı is a neighbourhood in the municipality and district of Şereflikoçhisar, Ankara Province, Turkey. Its population is 61 (2022).
