= Cihanşah, Haymana =

Cihanşah
- Neighbourhood
- Location in Turkey Cihanşah (Turkey Central Anatolia)
- Coordinates: 39°08′N 32°33′E
- Country: Turkey
- Province: Ankara
- District: Haymana
- Population (2022): 234
- Time zone: UTC+3 (TRT)

Cihanşah is a neighbourhood in the municipality and district of Haymana, Ankara Province, Turkey. Its population is 234 (2022).
