= Çayırönü, Şereflikoçhisar =

Çayırönü
- Neighbourhood
- Location in Turkey Çayırönü (Turkey Central Anatolia)
- Coordinates: 38.8886°N 33.7133°E
- Country: Turkey
- Province: Ankara
- District: Şereflikoçhisar
- Population (2022): 47
- Time zone: UTC+3 (TRT)

Çayırönü is a neighbourhood in the municipality and district of Şereflikoçhisar, Ankara Province, Turkey. Its population is 47 (2022).
