= Kerişli, Bala =

Kerişli
- Neighbourhood
- Location in Turkey Kerişli (Turkey Central Anatolia)
- Coordinates: 39°42′N 33°08′E
- Country: Turkey
- Province: Ankara
- District: Bala
- Population (2022): 177
- Time zone: UTC+3 (TRT)

Kerişli is a neighbourhood in the municipality and district of Bala, Ankara Province, Turkey. Its population is 177 (2022).
