= Küçükdamlacık, Şereflikoçhisar =

Küçükdamlacık
- Neighbourhood
- Location in Turkey Küçükdamlacık (Turkey Central Anatolia)
- Coordinates: 39°14′N 33°20′E
- Country: Turkey
- Province: Ankara
- District: Şereflikoçhisar
- Population (2022): 121
- Time zone: UTC+3 (TRT)

Küçükdamlacık (Turkish: [cyˈtʃycdamɫadʒɯk]) is a neighbourhood in the municipality and district of Şereflikoçhisar, Ankara Province, Turkey. Its population is 121 (2022). The village is populated by Kurds.
