= Demirözü, Haymana =

Demirözü
- Neighbourhood
- Location in Turkey Demirözü (Turkey Central Anatolia)
- Coordinates: 39°15′31″N 32°21′59″E
- Country: Turkey
- Province: Ankara
- District: Haymana
- Population (2022): 354
- Time zone: UTC+3 (TRT)

Demirözü is a neighbourhood in the municipality and district of Haymana, Ankara Province, Turkey. Its population is 354 (2022).

The village is populated by Kurds.
