= Karamollauşağı, Şereflikoçhisar =

Karamollauşağı
- Neighbourhood
- Location in Turkey Karamollauşağı (Turkey Central Anatolia)
- Coordinates: 38°51′N 33°31′E
- Country: Turkey
- Province: Ankara
- District: Şereflikoçhisar
- Population (2022): 113
- Time zone: UTC+3 (TRT)

Karamollauşağı (Turkish: [kaɾamoˈɫauʃaːɯ]) is a neighbourhood in the municipality and district of Şereflikoçhisar, Ankara Province, Turkey. Its population is 113 (2022).
