= Gülbağı, Bala =

Gülbağı
- Neighbourhood
- Location in Turkey Gülbağı (Turkey Central Anatolia)
- Coordinates: 39°21′N 32°56′E
- Country: Turkey
- Province: Ankara
- District: Bala
- Population (2022): 274
- Time zone: UTC+3 (TRT)

Gülbağı is a neighbourhood in the municipality and district of Bala, Ankara Province, Turkey. Its population is 274 (2022).
