= Koçyayla, Bala =

Koçyayla
- Neighbourhood
- Location in Turkey Koçyayla (Turkey Central Anatolia)
- Coordinates: 39.4611°N 32.9807°E
- Country: Turkey
- Province: Ankara
- District: Bala
- Population (2022): 170
- Time zone: UTC+3 (TRT)

Koçyayla is a neighbourhood in the municipality and district of Bala, Ankara Province, Turkey. Its population is 170 (2022).
