= Tepeköy, Bala =

Tepeköy
- Neighbourhood
- Location in Turkey Tepeköy (Turkey Central Anatolia)
- Coordinates: 39°20′40″N 33°26′40″E
- Country: Turkey
- Province: Ankara
- District: Bala
- Population (2022): 102
- Time zone: UTC+3 (TRT)

Tepeköy is a neighbourhood in the municipality and district of Bala, Ankara Province, Turkey. Its population is 102 (2022).

The village is populated by Kurds.
