= Deliller, Şereflikoçhisar =

Deliller
- Neighbourhood
- Location in Turkey Deliller (Turkey Central Anatolia)
- Coordinates: 39°0′13″N 33°40′34″E
- Country: Turkey
- Province: Ankara
- District: Şereflikoçhisar
- Population (2022): 107
- Time zone: UTC+3 (TRT)

Deliller is a neighbourhood in the municipality and district of Şereflikoçhisar, Ankara Province, Turkey. Its population is 107 (2022).
