= Küçükbıyık, Bala =

Küçükbıyık
- Neighbourhood
- Location in Turkey Küçükbıyık (Turkey Central Anatolia)
- Coordinates: 39°17′N 33°27′E
- Country: Turkey
- Province: Ankara
- District: Bala
- Population (2022): 223
- Time zone: UTC+3 (TRT)

Küçükbıyık is a neighbourhood in the municipality and district of Bala, Ankara Province, Turkey. Its population is 223 (2022).

The village is populated by Kurds.
