= Yöreli, Bala =

Yöreli
- Neighbourhood
- Location in Turkey Yöreli (Turkey Central Anatolia)
- Coordinates: 39.5200°N 32.9556°E
- Country: Turkey
- Province: Ankara
- District: Bala
- Population (2022): 348
- Time zone: UTC+3 (TRT)

Yöreli is a neighbourhood in the municipality and district of Bala, Ankara Province, Turkey. Its population is 348 (2022).
