= Büyükboyalık, Bala =

Büyükboyalık
- Neighbourhood
- Location in Turkey Büyükboyalık (Turkey Central Anatolia)
- Coordinates: 39°34′N 33°14′E
- Country: Turkey
- Province: Ankara
- District: Bala
- Population (2022): 603
- Time zone: UTC+3 (TRT)

Büyükboyalık is a neighbourhood in the municipality and district of Bala, Ankara Province, Turkey. Its population is 603 (2022).
