= Kerpiç, Haymana =

Kerpiç
- Neighbourhood
- Location in Turkey Kerpiç (Turkey Central Anatolia)
- Coordinates: 39°04′21″N 32°36′31″E
- Country: Turkey
- Province: Ankara
- District: Haymana
- Population (2022): 740
- Time zone: UTC+3 (TRT)

Kerpiç is a neighbourhood in the municipality and district of Haymana, Ankara Province, Turkey. Its population is 740 (2022).

The village is populated by Kurds. Kerpic Koyu was the first Kurdish village.
