= Ahırlıkuyu, Haymana =

Ahırlıkuyu
- Neighbourhood
- Location in Turkey Ahırlıkuyu (Turkey Central Anatolia)
- Coordinates: 39°27′N 32°24′E
- Country: Turkey
- Province: Ankara
- District: Haymana
- Population (2022): 74
- Time zone: UTC+3 (TRT)

Ahırlıkuyu is a neighbourhood in the municipality and district of Haymana, Ankara Province, Turkey.

Its population was 74 (2022).
