= Kirazoğlu, Haymana =

Kirazoğlu
- Neighbourhood
- Location in Turkey Kirazoğlu (Turkey Central Anatolia)
- Coordinates: 39.2303°N 32.4406°E
- Country: Turkey
- Province: Ankara
- District: Haymana
- Population (2022): 210
- Time zone: UTC+3 (TRT)

Kirazoğlu is a neighbourhood in the municipality and district of Haymana, Ankara Province, Turkey. Its population is 210 (2022).

The village is populated by Kurds.
