= Büyükbıyık, Bala =

Büyükbıyık
- Neighbourhood
- Country: Turkey
- Province: Ankara
- District: Bala
- Population (2022): 422
- Time zone: UTC+3 (TRT)

Büyükbıyık (also: Kuyular) is a neighbourhood in the municipality and district of Bala, Ankara Province, Turkey. Its population is 422 (2022).

The village is populated by Kurds.
