= Akarca, Şereflikoçhisar =

Akarca
- Neighbourhood
- Location in Turkey Akarca (Turkey Central Anatolia)
- Coordinates: 39.1749°N 33.2163°E
- Country: Turkey
- Province: Ankara
- District: Şereflikoçhisar
- Population (2022): 133
- Time zone: UTC+3 (TRT)

Akarca is a neighbourhood in the municipality and district of Şereflikoçhisar, Ankara Province, Turkey. Its population is 133 (2022). The village is populated by Kurds.
