= Kutluhan, Haymana =

Kutluhan
- Neighbourhood
- Location in Turkey Kutluhan (Turkey Central Anatolia)
- Coordinates: 39°12′N 32°41′E
- Country: Turkey
- Province: Ankara
- District: Haymana
- Population (2022): 220
- Time zone: UTC+3 (TRT)

Kutluhan is a neighbourhood in the municipality and district of Haymana, Ankara Province, Turkey. Its population is 220 (2022). The village is populated by Kurds.
