= Yusufkuyusu, Şereflikoçhisar =

Yusufkuyusu
- Neighbourhood
- Location in Turkey Yusufkuyusu (Turkey Central Anatolia)
- Coordinates: 39°12′N 33°18′E
- Country: Turkey
- Province: Ankara
- District: Şereflikoçhisar
- Population (2022): 34
- Time zone: UTC+3 (TRT)

Yusufkuyusu is a neighbourhood in the municipality and district of Şereflikoçhisar, Ankara Province, Turkey. Its population is 34 (2022). The village is populated by Kurds.
