= Eğribasan, Bala =

Eğribasan
- Neighbourhood
- Location in Turkey Eğribasan (Turkey Central Anatolia)
- Coordinates: 39°17′N 33°16′E
- Country: Turkey
- Province: Ankara
- District: Bala
- Population (2022): 91
- Time zone: UTC+3 (TRT)

Eğribasan is a neighbourhood in the municipality and district of Bala, Ankara Province, Turkey. Its population is 91 (2022). The village is populated by Kurds.
