= Serinyayla, Haymana =

Serinyayla
- Neighbourhood
- Location in Turkey Serinyayla (Turkey Central Anatolia)
- Coordinates: 39°10′8″N 32°32′2″E
- Country: Turkey
- Province: Ankara
- District: Haymana
- Population (2022): 252
- Time zone: UTC+3 (TRT)

Serinyayla is a neighbourhood in the municipality and district of Haymana, Ankara Province, Turkey. Its population is 252 (2022).
