= Aktaş, Şereflikoçhisar =

Aktaş
- Neighbourhood
- Location in Turkey Aktaş (Turkey Central Anatolia)
- Coordinates: 39.226°N 33.137°E
- Country: Turkey
- Province: Ankara
- District: Şereflikoçhisar
- Population (2022): 45
- Time zone: UTC+3 (TRT)

Aktaş is a neighbourhood in the municipality and district of Şereflikoçhisar, Ankara Province, Turkey. Its population is 45 (2022). The village is populated by Kurds. Aktaş is the home village of Kurdish politician Murat Bozlak.
