= Küçükboyalık, Bala =

Küçükboyalık
- Neighbourhood
- Location in Turkey Küçükboyalık (Turkey Central Anatolia)
- Coordinates: 39°34′20″N 33°14′20″E
- Country: Turkey
- Province: Ankara
- District: Bala
- Population (2022): 128
- Time zone: UTC+3 (TRT)

Küçükboyalık is a neighbourhood in the municipality and district of Bala, Ankara Province, Turkey. Its population is 128 (2022).
