= Katrancı, Haymana =

Katrancı
- Neighbourhood
- Location in Turkey Katrancı (Turkey Central Anatolia)
- Coordinates: 39.2794°N 32.5531°E
- Country: Turkey
- Province: Ankara
- District: Haymana
- Population (2022): 312
- Time zone: UTC+3 (TRT)

Katrancı is a neighbourhood in the municipality and district of Haymana, Ankara Province, Turkey. Its population is 312 (2022).

The village is populated by the Kurdish Modan tribe.
