= Sarıhüyük, Bala =

Sarıhüyük
- Neighbourhood
- Location in Turkey Sarıhüyük (Turkey Central Anatolia)
- Coordinates: 39°18′N 33°17′E
- Country: Turkey
- Province: Ankara
- District: Bala
- Population (2022): 187
- Time zone: UTC+3 (TRT)

Sarıhüyük is a neighbourhood in the municipality and district of Bala, Ankara Province, Turkey. Its population is 187 (2022).
