= Aydoğan, Bala =

Aydoğan
- Neighbourhood
- Location in Turkey Aydoğan (Turkey Central Anatolia)
- Coordinates: 39.6052°N 33.1783°E
- Country: Turkey
- Province: Ankara
- District: Bala
- Population (2022): 156
- Time zone: UTC+3 (TRT)

Aydoğan is a neighbourhood in the municipality and district of Bala, Ankara Province, Turkey. Its population is 156 (2022).

The village is populated by Kurds.
