= Büyükdamlacık, Şereflikoçhisar =

Büyükdamlacık
- Neighbourhood
- Location in Turkey Büyükdamlacık (Turkey Central Anatolia)
- Coordinates: 39°13′N 33°20′E
- Country: Turkey
- Province: Ankara
- District: Şereflikoçhisar
- Population (2022): 224
- Time zone: UTC+3 (TRT)

Büyükdamlacık is a neighbourhood in the municipality and district of Şereflikoçhisar, Ankara Province, Turkey. Its population is 224 (2022). The village is populated by Kurds.
