= Akkoyunlu, Bala =

Akkoyunlu
- Neighbourhood
- Location in Turkey Akkoyunlu (Turkey Central Anatolia)
- Coordinates: 39°41′32″N 33°12′9″E
- Country: Turkey
- Province: Ankara
- District: Bala
- Population (2022): 343
- Time zone: UTC+3 (TRT)

Akkoyunlu (formerly: Büyük Davdanlı) is a neighbourhood in the municipality and district of Bala, Ankara Province, Turkey. Its population is 343 (2022).

The village is populated by Kurds.
