= Tolköy, Bala =

Tolköy
- Neighbourhood
- Location in Turkey Tolköy (Turkey Central Anatolia)
- Coordinates: 39.6378°N 33.0531°E
- Country: Turkey
- Province: Ankara
- District: Bala
- Population (2022): 534
- Time zone: UTC+3 (TRT)

Tolköy is a neighbourhood in the municipality and district of Bala, Ankara Province, Turkey. Its population is 534 (2022).
