= Emirler, Haymana =

Emirler
- Neighbourhood
- Location in Turkey Emirler (Turkey Central Anatolia)
- Coordinates: 39.0501°N 32.3419°E
- Country: Turkey
- Province: Ankara
- District: Haymana
- Population (2022): 429
- Time zone: UTC+3 (TRT)

Emirler is a neighbourhood in the municipality and district of Haymana, Ankara Province, Turkey. Its population is 429 (2022).

The village is populated by Kurds.
