= Bağobası, Şereflikoçhisar =

Bağobası
- Neighbourhood
- Location in Turkey Bağobası (Turkey Central Anatolia)
- Coordinates: 38°55′N 33°43′E
- Country: Turkey
- Province: Ankara
- District: Şereflikoçhisar
- Population (2022): 45
- Time zone: UTC+3 (TRT)

Bağobası is a neighbourhood in the municipality and district of Şereflikoçhisar, Ankara Province, Turkey. Its population is 45 (2022).
