= Acıkuyu, Şereflikoçhisar =

Acıkuyu
- Neighbourhood
- Location in Turkey Acıkuyu (Turkey Central Anatolia)
- Coordinates: 39.1119°N 33.4304°E
- Country: Turkey
- Province: Ankara
- District: Şereflikoçhisar
- Population (2022): 117
- Time zone: UTC+3 (TRT)

Acıkuyu is a neighbourhood in the municipality and district of Şereflikoçhisar, Ankara Province, Turkey. Its population is 117 (2022). It used to be considered a village before 2013 Turkish local government reorganisation.

== Demographics ==
Historical population
| Year | Pop. | ±% p.a. |
|---|---|---|
| 1965 | 716 | — |
| 1970 | 763 | +1.28% |
| 1975 | 608 | −4.44% |
| 1980 | 383 | −8.83% |
| 1985 | 300 | −4.77% |
| 1990 | 124 | −16.20% |
| 2000 | 91 | −3.05% |
| 2007 | 51 | −7.94% |
| 2012 | 64 | +4.65% |
| 2017 | 89 | +6.82% |
| 2022 | 117 | +5.62% |
Source: TÜIK (2007-2022)
