= Yeniköy, Bala =

Yeniköy
- Neighbourhood
- Location in Turkey Yeniköy (Turkey Central Anatolia)
- Coordinates: 39.4863°N 33.0130°E
- Country: Turkey
- Province: Ankara
- District: Bala
- Population (2022): 359
- Time zone: UTC+3 (TRT)

Yeniköy is a neighbourhood in the municipality and district of Bala, Ankara Province, Turkey. Its population is 359 (2022). The village is populated by Kurds.
