= Culuk, Haymana =

Culuk
- Neighbourhood
- Location in Turkey Culuk (Turkey Central Anatolia)
- Coordinates: 39°26′N 32°42′E
- Country: Turkey
- Province: Ankara
- District: Haymana
- Population (2022): 462
- Time zone: UTC+3 (TRT)

Culuk is a neighbourhood in the municipality and district of Haymana, Ankara Province, Turkey. Its population is 462 (2022).
