= Doğankaya, Şereflikoçhisar =

Doğankaya
- Neighbourhood
- Location in Turkey Doğankaya (Turkey Central Anatolia)
- Coordinates: 39.207°N 33.193°E
- Country: Turkey
- Province: Ankara
- District: Şereflikoçhisar
- Population (2022): 112
- Time zone: UTC+3 (TRT)

Doğankaya is a neighbourhood in the municipality and district of Şereflikoçhisar, Ankara Province, Turkey. Its population is 112 (2022).
