= Durupınar, Haymana =

Durupınar
- Neighbourhood
- Location in Turkey Durupınar (Turkey Central Anatolia)
- Coordinates: 39.3428°N 32.7372°E
- Country: Turkey
- Province: Ankara
- District: Haymana
- Population (2022): 178
- Time zone: UTC+3 (TRT)

Durupınar is a neighbourhood in the municipality and district of Haymana, Ankara Province, Turkey. Its population is 178 (2022).
