= Büyükyağcı, Haymana =

Büyükyağcı
- Neighbourhood
- Location in Turkey Büyükyağcı (Turkey Central Anatolia)
- Coordinates: 39°09′N 32°31′E
- Country: Turkey
- Province: Ankara
- District: Haymana
- Population (2022): 200
- Time zone: UTC+3 (TRT)

Büyükyağcı is a neighbourhood in the municipality and district of Haymana, Ankara Province, Turkey. Its population is 200 (2022).

The village is populated by Kurds.
