= Ahmetçayırı, Bala =

Ahmetçayırı
- Neighbourhood
- Location in Turkey Ahmetçayırı (Turkey Central Anatolia)
- Coordinates: 39°29′N 32°56′E
- Country: Turkey
- Province: Ankara
- District: Bala
- Population (2022): 184
- Time zone: UTC+3 (TRT)

Ahmetçayırı is a neighbourhood in the municipality and district of Bala, Ankara Province, Turkey. Its population is 184 (2022).
