= Küçükyağcı, Haymana =

Küçükyağcı
- Neighbourhood
- Location in Turkey Küçükyağcı (Turkey Central Anatolia)
- Coordinates: 39°08′N 32°29′E
- Country: Turkey
- Province: Ankara
- District: Haymana
- Population (2022): 53
- Time zone: UTC+3 (TRT)

Küçükyağcı is a neighbourhood in the municipality and district of Haymana, Ankara Province, Turkey. Its population is 53 (2022). Küçükyağcı is 126 kilometers away from the city center of Ankara, and 49 kilometers away from the district center of Haymana.

The village is populated by Kurds.
