= Yeniyapanşeyhli, Bala =

Yeniyapanşeyhli
- Neighbourhood
- Location in Turkey Yeniyapanşeyhli (Turkey Central Anatolia)
- Coordinates: 39°26′N 33°11′E
- Country: Turkey
- Province: Ankara
- District: Bala
- Population (2022): 451
- Time zone: UTC+3 (TRT)

Yeniyapanşeyhli is a neighbourhood in the municipality and district of Bala, Ankara Province, Turkey. Its population is 451 (2022).
