= Kızılkoyunlu, Haymana =

Kızılkoyunlu
- Neighbourhood
- Location in Turkey Kızılkoyunlu (Turkey Central Anatolia)
- Coordinates: 39°22′N 32°35′E
- Country: Turkey
- Province: Ankara
- District: Haymana
- Population (2022): 257
- Time zone: UTC+3 (TRT)

Kızılkoyunlu is a neighbourhood in the municipality and district of Haymana, Ankara Province, Turkey. Its population is 257 (2022).
