= Toyçayırı, Haymana =

Toyçayırı
- Neighbourhood
- Location in Turkey Toyçayırı (Turkey Central Anatolia)
- Coordinates: 39°02′N 32°27′E
- Country: Turkey
- Province: Ankara
- District: Haymana
- Population (2022): 176
- Time zone: UTC+3 (TRT)

Toyçayırı is a neighbourhood in the municipality and district of Haymana, Ankara Province, Turkey. Its population is 176 (2022).

The village is populated by the Kurdish Modan tribe.
