= Palazobası, Şereflikoçhisar =

Palazobası
- Neighbourhood
- Location in Turkey Palazobası (Turkey Central Anatolia)
- Coordinates: 39°03′N 33°37′E
- Country: Turkey
- Province: Ankara
- District: Şereflikoçhisar
- Population (2022): 83
- Time zone: UTC+3 (TRT)

Palazobası is a neighbourhood in the municipality and district of Şereflikoçhisar, Ankara Province, Turkey. Its population is 83 (2022).
