= Büyükkonak, Haymana =

Büyükkonak
- Neighbourhood
- Location in Turkey Büyükkonak (Turkey Central Anatolia)
- Coordinates: 39°10′N 32°25′E
- Country: Turkey
- Province: Ankara
- District: Haymana
- Population (2022): 84
- Time zone: UTC+3 (TRT)

Büyükkonak (formerly: Büyükkonakgörmez) is a neighbourhood in the municipality and district of Haymana, Ankara Province, Turkey. Its population is 84 (2022).

The village is populated by Kurds.
