= Esen, Haymana =

Esen
- Neighbourhood
- Location in Turkey Esen (Turkey Central Anatolia)
- Coordinates: 39.4019°N 32.4036°E
- Country: Turkey
- Province: Ankara
- District: Haymana
- Population (2022): 117
- Time zone: UTC+3 (TRT)

Esen is a neighbourhood in the municipality and district of Haymana, Ankara Province, Turkey. Its population is 117 (2022).
