= Cıngıl, Şereflikoçhisar =

Cıngıl
- Neighbourhood
- Location in Turkey Cıngıl (Turkey Central Anatolia)
- Coordinates: 38°56′N 33°42′E
- Country: Turkey
- Province: Ankara
- District: Şereflikoçhisar
- Population (2022): 78
- Time zone: UTC+3 (TRT)

Cıngıl is a neighbourhood in the municipality and district of Şereflikoçhisar, Ankara Province, Turkey. Its population is 78 (2022).
