= Davdanlı, Bala =

Davdanlı
- Neighbourhood
- Location in Turkey Davdanlı (Turkey Central Anatolia)
- Coordinates: 39°42′N 33°14′E
- Country: Turkey
- Province: Ankara
- District: Bala
- Population (2022): 229
- Time zone: UTC+3 (TRT)

Davdanlı is a neighbourhood in the municipality and district of Bala, Ankara Province, Turkey. Its population is 229 (2022).

The village is populated by Kurds.
