= Tatarhüyük, Bala =

Tatarhüyük
- Neighbourhood
- Location in Turkey Tatarhüyük (Turkey Central Anatolia)
- Coordinates: 39.2939°N 33.2910°E
- Country: Turkey
- Province: Ankara
- District: Bala
- Population (2022): 105
- Time zone: UTC+3 (TRT)

Tatarhüyük is a neighbourhood in the municipality and district of Bala, Ankara Province, Turkey. Its population is 105 (2022).
