= Çiğdemli, Bala =

Çiğdemli
- Neighbourhood
- Location in Turkey Çiğdemli (Turkey Central Anatolia)
- Coordinates: 39.4892°N 33.1379°E
- Country: Turkey
- Province: Ankara
- District: Bala
- Population (2022): 254
- Time zone: UTC+3 (TRT)

Çiğdemli is a neighbourhood in the municipality and district of Bala, Ankara Province, Turkey. Its population is 254 (2022).

The village is populated by Kurds.
