= Parlasan, Şereflikoçhisar =

Parlasan
- Neighbourhood
- Location in Turkey Parlasan (Turkey Central Anatolia)
- Coordinates: 39°03′18″N 33°35′05″E
- Country: Turkey
- Province: Ankara
- District: Şereflikoçhisar
- Population (2022): 105
- Time zone: UTC+3 (TRT)

Parlasan (formerly: Değirmenyolu) is a neighbourhood in the municipality and district of Şereflikoçhisar, Ankara Province, Turkey. Its population is 105 (2022).
