= Karandere, Şereflikoçhisar =

Karandere
- Neighbourhood
- Location in Turkey Karandere (Turkey Central Anatolia)
- Coordinates: 38°51′N 33°38′E
- Country: Turkey
- Province: Ankara
- District: Şereflikoçhisar
- Population (2022): 222
- Time zone: UTC+3 (TRT)

Karandere is a neighbourhood in the municipality and district of Şereflikoçhisar, Ankara Province, Turkey. Its population is 222 (2022).
