= Sarıdeğirmen, Haymana =

Sarıdeğirmen
- Neighbourhood
- Location in Turkey Sarıdeğirmen (Turkey Central Anatolia)
- Coordinates: 39°31′N 32°26′E
- Country: Turkey
- Province: Ankara
- District: Haymana
- Population (2022): 186
- Time zone: UTC+3 (TRT)

Sarıdeğirmen is a neighbourhood in the municipality and district of Haymana, Ankara Province, Turkey. Its population was 186 as of 2022.

The village is populated by Kurds.
