= Suyugüzel, Bala =

Suyugüzel
- Neighbourhood
- Location in Turkey Suyugüzel (Turkey Central Anatolia)
- Coordinates: 39°19′N 33°12′E
- Country: Turkey
- Province: Ankara
- District: Bala
- Population (2022): 334
- Time zone: UTC+3 (TRT)

Suyugüzel is a neighbourhood in the municipality and district of Bala, Ankara Province, Turkey. Its population is 334 (2022).
