= Şereflidavutlu, Şereflikoçhisar =

Şereflidavutlu
- Neighbourhood
- Location in Turkey Şereflidavutlu (Turkey Central Anatolia)
- Coordinates: 39°06′N 33°38′E
- Country: Turkey
- Province: Ankara
- District: Şereflikoçhisar
- Population (2022): 104
- Time zone: UTC+3 (TRT)

Şereflidavutlu is a neighbourhood in the municipality and district of Şereflikoçhisar, Ankara Province, Turkey. Its population is 104 (2022).
