= Aliuşağı =

- Neighbourhood
- Location in Turkey Aliuşağı (Turkey Central Anatolia)
- Coordinates: 38°49′22″N 33°43′42″E
- Country: Turkey
- Province: Ankara
- District: Şereflikoçhisar
- Population (2022): 264
- Time zone: UTC+3 (TRT)

Aliuşağı is a neighbourhood in the municipality and district of Şereflikoçhisar, Ankara Province, Turkey. Its population is 264 (2022).
