= Yaylalıözü, Bala =

Yaylalıözü
- Neighbourhood
- Location in Turkey Yaylalıözü (Turkey Central Anatolia)
- Coordinates: 39°21′N 33°05′E
- Country: Turkey
- Province: Ankara
- District: Bala
- Population (2022): 267
- Time zone: UTC+3 (TRT)

Yaylalıözü is a neighbourhood in the municipality and district of Bala, Ankara Province, Turkey. Its population is 267 (2022).
