= Çatalçeşme, Bala =

Çatalçeşme
- Neighbourhood
- Location in Turkey Çatalçeşme (Turkey Central Anatolia)
- Coordinates: 39.5877°N 33.2542°E
- Country: Turkey
- Province: Ankara
- District: Bala
- Population (2022): 444
- Time zone: UTC+3 (TRT)

Çatalçeşme is a neighbourhood in the municipality and district of Bala, Ankara Province, Turkey. Its population is 444 (2022).
