= Şerefligökgöz, Haymana =

Şerefligökgöz
- Neighbourhood
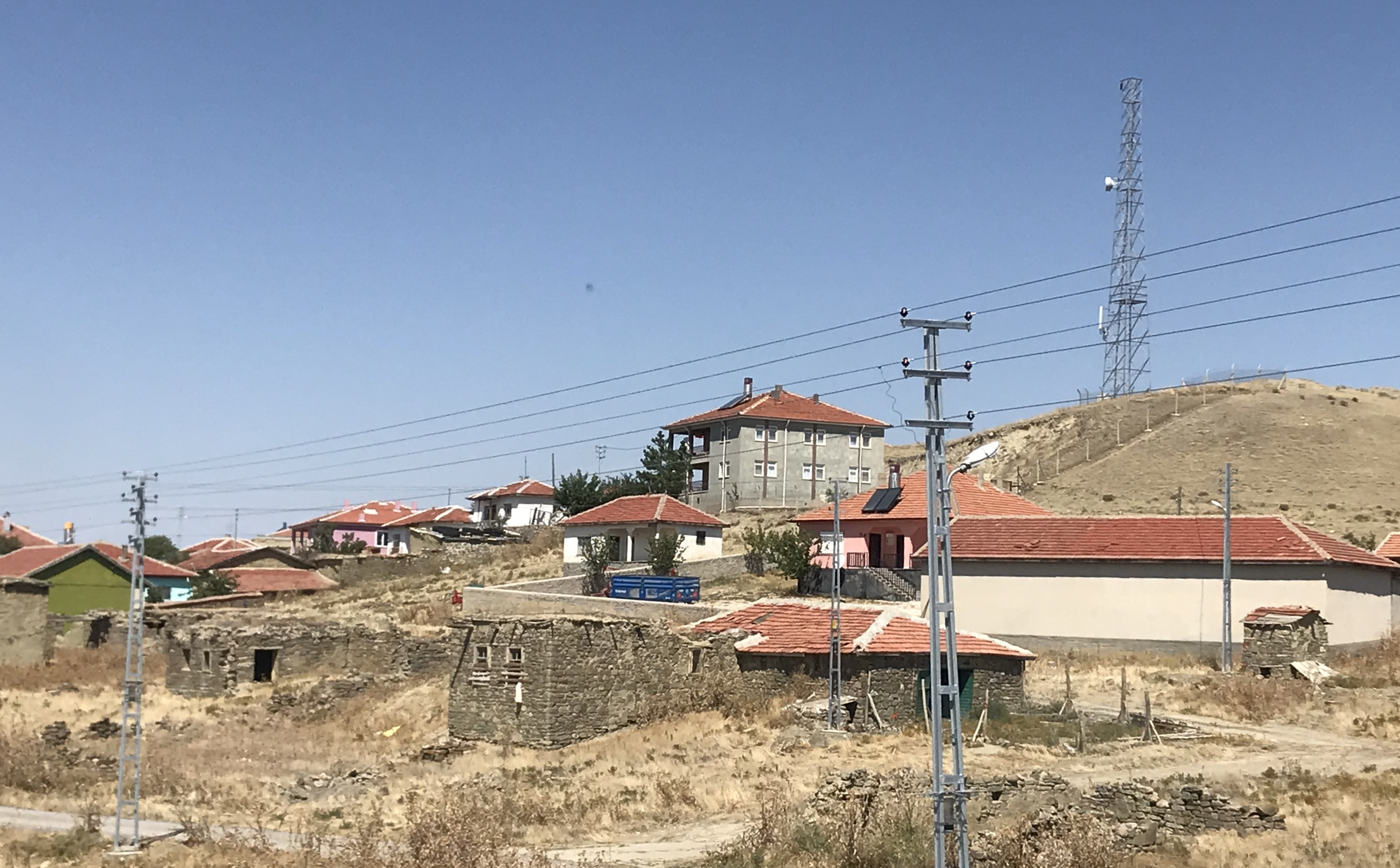

- Location within Turkey Location within Turkey Central Anatolia
- Coordinates: 39°18′N 32°36′E
- Country: Turkey
- Province: Ankara
- District: Haymana
- Population (2022): 254
- Time zone: UTC+3 (TRT)

Şerefligökgöz is a neighbourhood in the municipality and district of Haymana, Ankara Province, Turkey. Its population is 254 (2022).
