= Saatli, Haymana =

Saatli
- Neighbourhood
- Location within Turkey Location within Turkey Central Anatolia
- Coordinates: 39.0748°N 32.5463°E
- Country: Turkey
- Province: Ankara
- District: Haymana
- Population (2022): 95
- Time zone: UTC+3 (TRT)

Saatli is a neighbourhood in the municipality and district of Haymana, Ankara Province, Turkey. Its population is 95 (2022).

The village is populated by the Kurdish Modan tribe.
