= Alahacılı, Haymana =

Alahacılı
- Neighbourhood
- Location in Turkey Alahacılı (Turkey Central Anatolia)
- Coordinates: 38.9981°N 32.4332°E
- Country: Turkey
- Province: Ankara
- District: Haymana
- Population (2022): 311
- Time zone: UTC+3 (TRT)

Alahacılı is a neighbourhood in the municipality and district of Haymana, Ankara Province, Turkey. Its population is 311 (2022).

The village is populated by Kurds.
