= Belçarşak, Bala =

Belçarşak
- Neighbourhood
- Location in Turkey Belçarşak (Turkey Central Anatolia)
- Coordinates: 39°20′N 33°03′E
- Country: Turkey
- Province: Ankara
- District: Bala
- Population (2022): 446
- Time zone: UTC+3 (TRT)

Belçarşak is a neighbourhood in the municipality and district of Bala, Ankara Province, Turkey. Its population is 446 (2022).
