= Üzengilik, Şereflikoçhisar =

Üzengilik
- Neighbourhood
- Location in Turkey Üzengilik (Turkey Central Anatolia)
- Coordinates: 38°53′N 33°45′E
- Country: Turkey
- Province: Ankara
- District: Şereflikoçhisar
- Population (2022): 179
- Time zone: UTC+3 (TRT)

Üzengilik is a neighbourhood in the municipality and district of Şereflikoçhisar, Ankara Province, Turkey. Its population is 179 (2022).
