= Karahoca, Haymana =

Karahoca
- Neighbourhood
- Location in Turkey Karahoca (Turkey Central Anatolia)
- Coordinates: 39°24′N 32°34′E
- Country: Turkey
- Province: Ankara
- District: Haymana
- Population (2022): 202
- Time zone: UTC+3 (TRT)

Karahoca is a neighbourhood in the municipality and district of Haymana, Ankara Province, Turkey. Its population is 202 (2022).
