= Devecipınarı, Haymana =

Devecipınarı
- Neighbourhood
- Location in Turkey Devecipınarı (Turkey Central Anatolia)
- Coordinates: 39.1808°N 32.4775°E
- Country: Turkey
- Province: Ankara
- District: Haymana
- Population (2022): 36
- Time zone: UTC+3 (TRT)

Devecipınarı is a neighbourhood in the municipality and district of Haymana, Ankara Province, Turkey. Its population is 36 (2022).
