= Yurtbeyli, Haymana =

Yurtbeyli
- Neighbourhood
- Location in Turkey Yurtbeyli (Turkey Central Anatolia)
- Coordinates: 39°11′N 32°35′E
- Country: Turkey
- Province: Ankara
- District: Haymana
- Population (2022): 611
- Time zone: UTC+3 (TRT)

Yurtbeyli is a neighbourhood in the municipality and district of Haymana, Ankara Province, Turkey. Its population is 611 (2022). Before the 2013 reorganisation, it was a town (belde).

== Population ==
The village is populated by the Kurdish Şêxbizin tribe.
