= Küçükcamili, Bala =

Küçükcamili
- Neighbourhood
- Country: Turkey
- Province: Ankara
- District: Bala
- Population (2022): 358
- Time zone: UTC+3 (TRT)

Küçükcamili is a neighbourhood in the municipality and district of Bala, Ankara Province, Turkey. Its population is 358 (2022).

The village is populated by Kurds.
