= Akin, Şereflikoçhisar =

Akin
- Neighbourhood
- Location in Turkey Akin (Turkey Central Anatolia)
- Coordinates: 39.1242°N 33.2564°E
- Country: Turkey
- Province: Ankara
- District: Şereflikoçhisar
- Population (2022): 228
- Time zone: UTC+3 (TRT)

Akin is a neighbourhood in the municipality and district of Şereflikoçhisar, Ankara Province, Turkey. Its population is 228 (2022).

== Culture ==
The Nogay Turks of Akin village, whose lifestyle is closer to ancient Turkish customs, still maintain the tradition of drinking Nogay milk tea, also known as Tatar tea. Salt and butter can also be added to the milk tea. Among the pastries, pişi, taba börek, and şır börek are prominent cultural foods. Nevruz, Sabantoy, and Tepreş are celebrated.
