= Türkşerefli, Haymana =

Türkşerefli
- Neighbourhood
- Location in Turkey Türkşerefli (Turkey Central Anatolia)
- Coordinates: 39°37′N 32°28′E
- Country: Turkey
- Province: Ankara
- District: Haymana
- Population (2022): 189
- Time zone: UTC+3 (TRT)

Türkşerefli is a neighbourhood in the municipality and district of Haymana, Ankara Province, Turkey. Its population is 189 (2022).
