= Devekovan, Şereflikoçhisar =

Devekovan
- Neighbourhood
- Location in Turkey Devekovan (Turkey Central Anatolia)
- Coordinates: 38.8595°N 33.6976°E
- Country: Turkey
- Province: Ankara
- District: Şereflikoçhisar
- Population (2022): 293
- Time zone: UTC+3 (TRT)

Devekovan is a neighbourhood in the municipality and district of Şereflikoçhisar, Ankara Province, Turkey. Its population is 293 (2022). Before the 2013 reorganisation, it was a town (belde).
