= Haydarlı, Şereflikoçhisar =

Haydarlı
- Neighbourhood
- Country: Turkey
- Province: Ankara
- District: Şereflikoçhisar
- Population (2022): 90
- Time zone: UTC+3 (TRT)

Haydarlı is a neighbourhood in the municipality and district of Şereflikoçhisar, Ankara Province, Turkey. Its population is 90 (2022).
