= Bala, Ankara =

Bala
- District and municipality
- Map showing Bala District in Ankara Province

- Location in Turkey Bala (Turkey Central Anatolia)
- Coordinates: 39°33′14″N 33°07′16″E
- Country: Turkey
- Province: Ankara

Government
  - Mayor: Ahmet Buran (AKP)
- Area: 1,851 km^{2} (715 sq mi)
- Elevation: 1,310 m (4,300 ft)
- Population (2022): 20,521
  - Density: 11.09/km^{2} (28.71/sq mi)
- Time zone: UTC+3 (TRT)
- Postal code: 06720
- Area code: 0312
- Website: www.bala.bel.tr

Bala (also: Balâ) is a municipality and district of Ankara Province, Turkey. Its area is 1,851 km^{2}, and its population is 20,521 (2022). It is 67 km south-east of the city centre of Ankara. Its elevation is 1,310 m (4,298 ft).

Bala stands on a high plain, summers are hot, winters are cold and snowy. The town of Bala is small but busy with shops and light manufacturing workshops, the surrounding countryside is used for farming, especially grains and sunflower seeds. Recently Ankara's wealthier citizens have begun building luxury housing in some villages of Bala. However the town stands on a fault line and experiences many earthquakes.

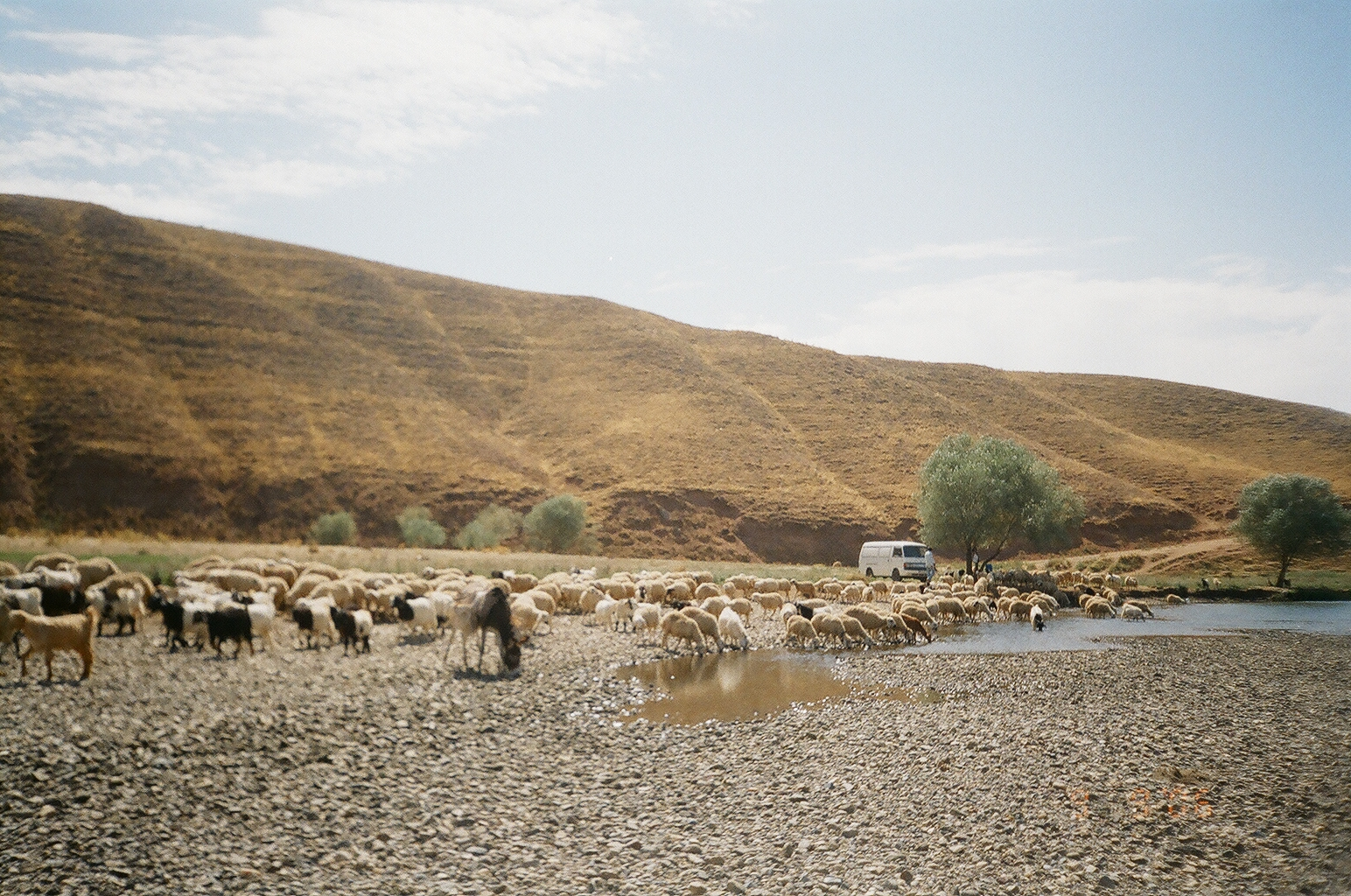

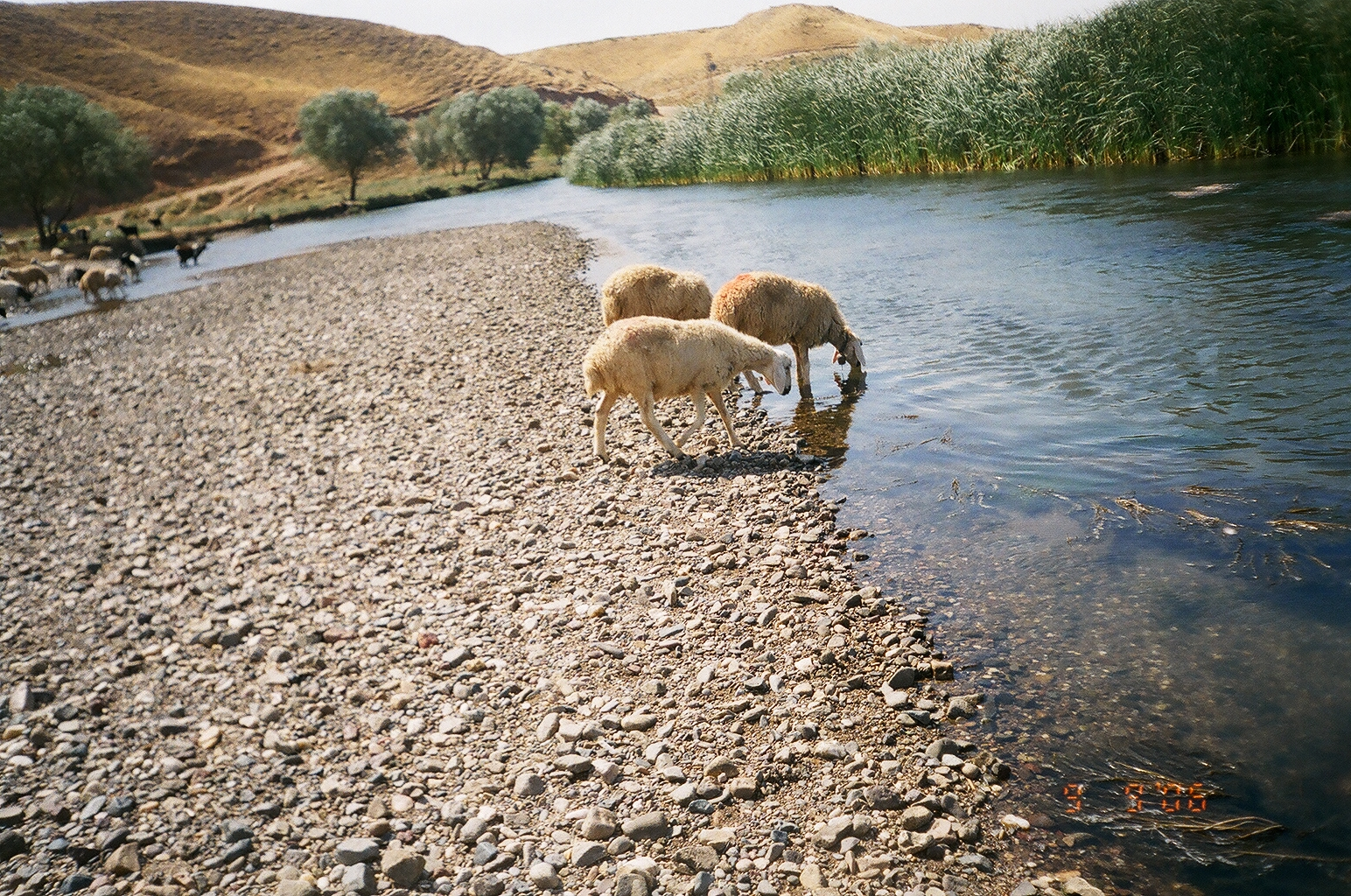

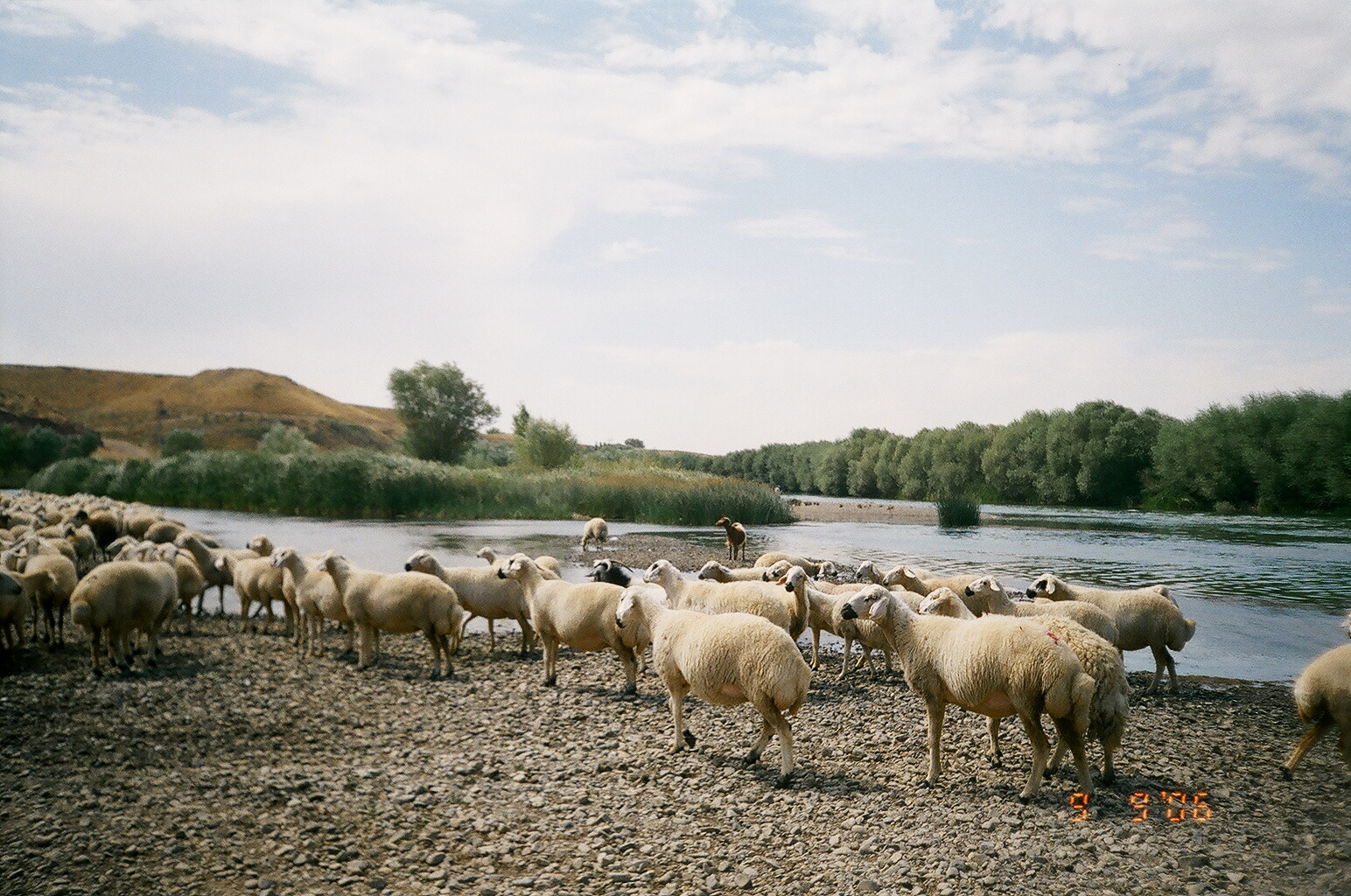

== Places of interest ==
The forest of Beynam and the Kesikköprü reservoir are two of Ankara's most popular picnic spots.

== Composition ==
There are 55 neighbourhoods in Bala District:

- Abazlı
- Afşar
- Ahmetçayırı
- Akkoyunlu
- Aşağıhacıbekir
- Aşıkoğlu
- Aydoğan
- Bahçekaradalak
- Bektaşlı
- Belçarşak
- Beynam
- Büyükbayat
- Büyükbıyık
- Büyükboyalık
- Büyükcamili
- Çatalçeşme
- Çatalören
- Çiğdemli
- Davdanlı
- Derekışla
- Eğribasan
- Erdemli
- Ergin
- Göztepe
- Gülbağı
- Hamidiye
- Hanburun
- İsmetpaşa
- Karahamzalı
- Kartaltepe
- Kerişli
- Kesikköprü
- Kızılırmak
- Koçyayla
- Köseli
- Küçükbayat
- Küçükbıyık
- Küçükboyalık
- Küçükcamili
- Sarıhüyük
- Şehriban
- Şentepe
- Sırapınar
- Sofular
- Suyugüzel
- Tatarhüyük
- Tepeköy
- Tolköy
- Üçem
- Yaylalıözü
- Yeniköy
- Yeniyapançarşak
- Yeniyapanşeyhli
- Yöreli
- Yukarıhacıbekir
