= Köseli, Bala =

Köseli
- Neighbourhood
- Location in Turkey Köseli (Turkey Central Anatolia)
- Coordinates: 39.6633°N 33.0792°E
- Country: Turkey
- Province: Ankara
- District: Bala
- Population (2022): 471
- Time zone: UTC+3 (TRT)

Köseli is a neighbourhood in the municipality and district of Bala, Ankara Province, Turkey. Its population is 471 (2022).
