= Erdemli, Bala =

Erdemli
- Neighbourhood
- Country: Turkey
- Province: Ankara
- District: Bala
- Population (2022): 102
- Time zone: UTC+3 (TRT)

Erdemli is a neighbourhood in the municipality and district of Bala, Ankara Province, Turkey. Its population is 102 (2022). The village is populated by Kurds.
