= Çalören, Şereflikoçhisar =

Çalören
- Neighbourhood
- Location in Turkey Çalören (Turkey Central Anatolia)
- Coordinates: 38°46′N 33°42′E
- Country: Turkey
- Province: Ankara
- District: Şereflikoçhisar
- Population (2022): 421
- Time zone: UTC+3 (TRT)

Çalören is a neighbourhood in the municipality and district of Şereflikoçhisar, Ankara Province, Turkey. Its population is 421 (2022). Before the 2013 reorganisation, it was a town (belde).
