= Şereflikoçhisar =

- District and municipality
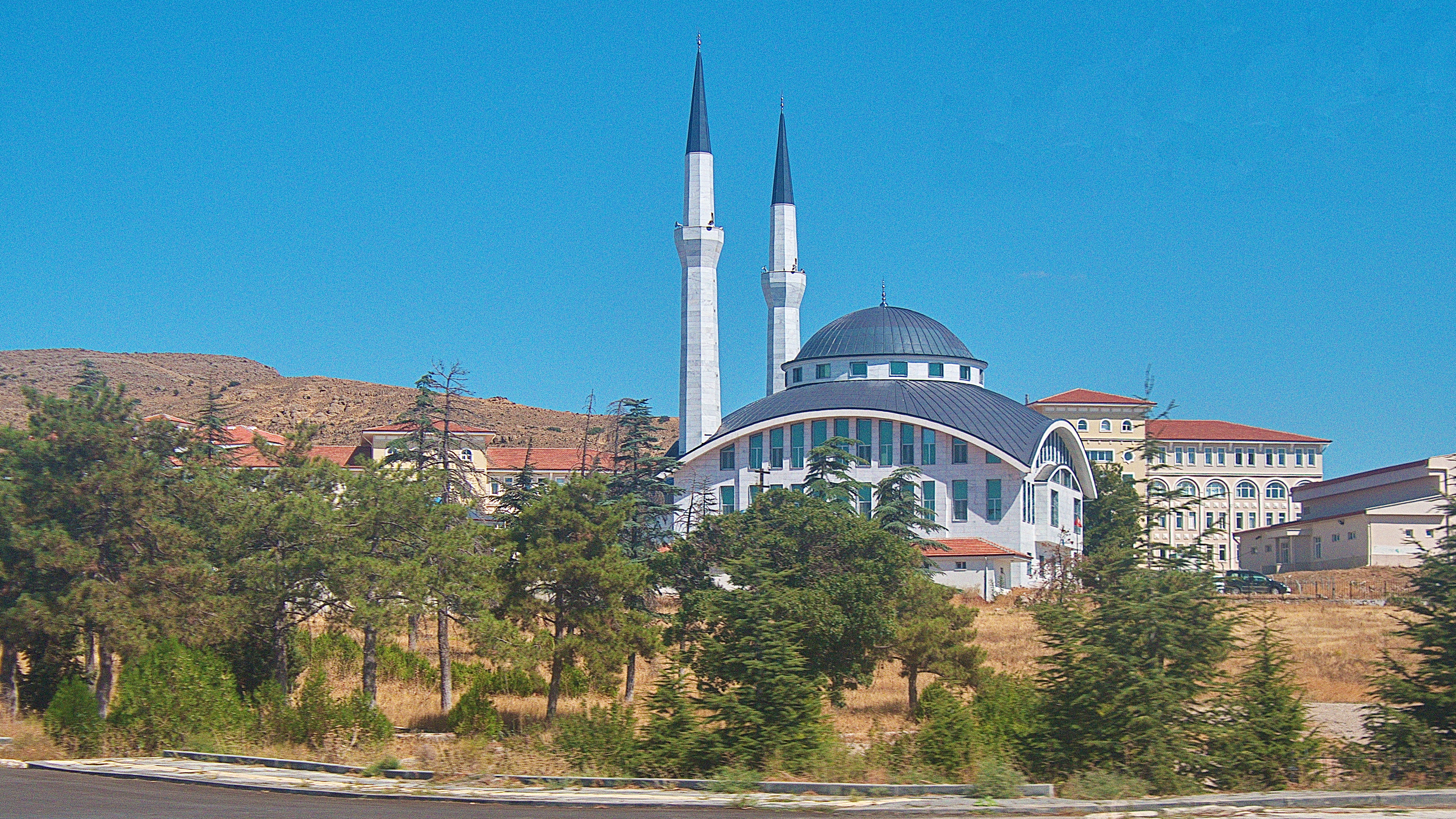
- Şereflikoçhisar New Mosque

- Logo

- Map showing Şereflikoçhisar District in Ankara Province

- Location within Turkey Location within Turkey Central Anatolia
- Coordinates: 38°56′40″N 33°32′31″E
- Country: Turkey
- Province: Ankara

Government
  - Mayor: Mustafa Koçak (CHP)
- Area: 2,155 km^{2} (832 sq mi)
- Elevation: 975 m (3,199 ft)
- Population (2022): 33,140
  - Density: 15.38/km^{2} (39.83/sq mi)
- Time zone: UTC+3 (TRT)
- Postal code: 06950
- Area code: 0312
- Website: www.sereflikochisar.bel.tr

Şereflikoçhisar (Turkish: [ʃeɾefˈlikotʃhisaɾ]), formerly known as Koçhisar, is a municipality and district of Ankara Province, Turkey. Its area is 2,155 km^{2}, and its population is 33,140 (2022). It is 148 km south of the city of Ankara. Its average elevation ranges between 900 and 1,200 m, with the highest point being Mt. Karasenir at 1,650 m.

The area is a flat dry plain, the only water source being Hirfanlı reservoir and the salt lake Lake Tuz. The countryside is inhospitable, with minerals extracted from the salt lake being a major source of income. Therefore, the rural population is migrating to nearby towns or abroad.

== Demographics ==
Historical population
Year	Pop.	±% p.a.
1965	69,201	—
1970	75,675	+1.80%
1975	82,207	+1.67%
1980	79,330	−0.71%
1985	87,893	+2.07%
1990	60,701	−7.14%
2000	59,128	−0.26%
2007	34,808	−7.29%
2012	35,042	+0.13%
2017	33,559	−0.86%
2022	33,140	−0.25%
Source: TÜIK (2007-2022)

== Name ==
The name derives from the Seljuk Turkish castle of Koçhisar. The prefix Şerefli meaning "honourable" was added by Atatürk in recognition of the men of the town lost at the battle of Gallipoli.

== History ==
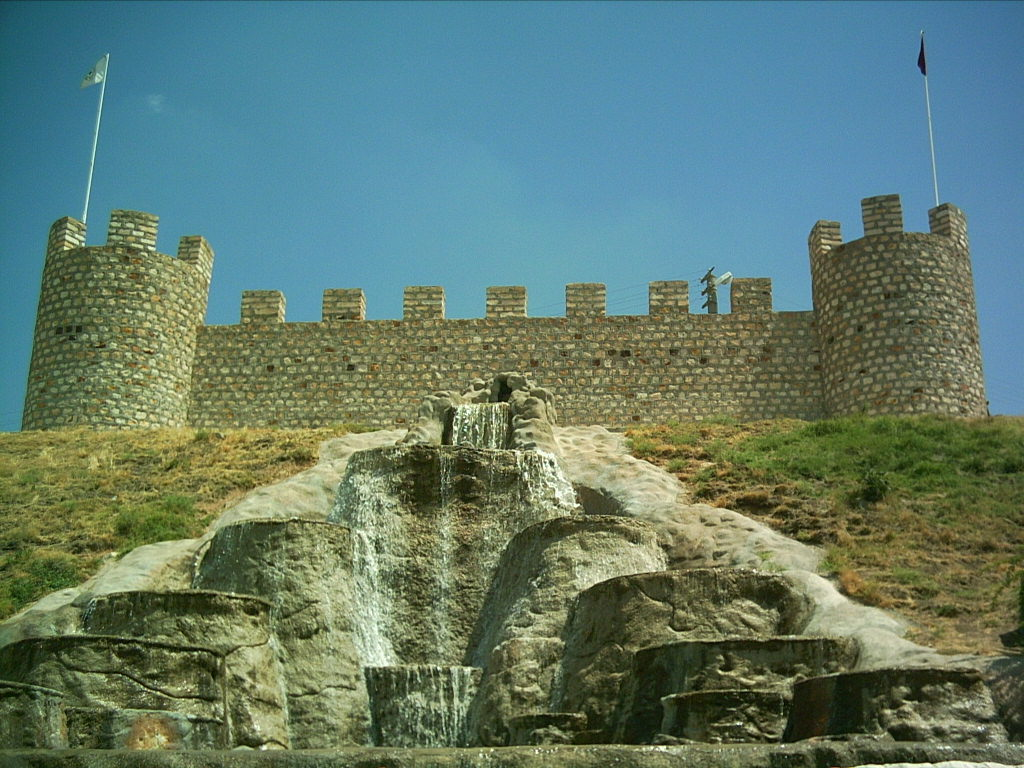
Castle of Şereflikoçhisar

Şereflikoçhisar is believed to have been inhabited since the time of the Hittites and was a thriving town in the Seljuk and Ottoman Empire periods.

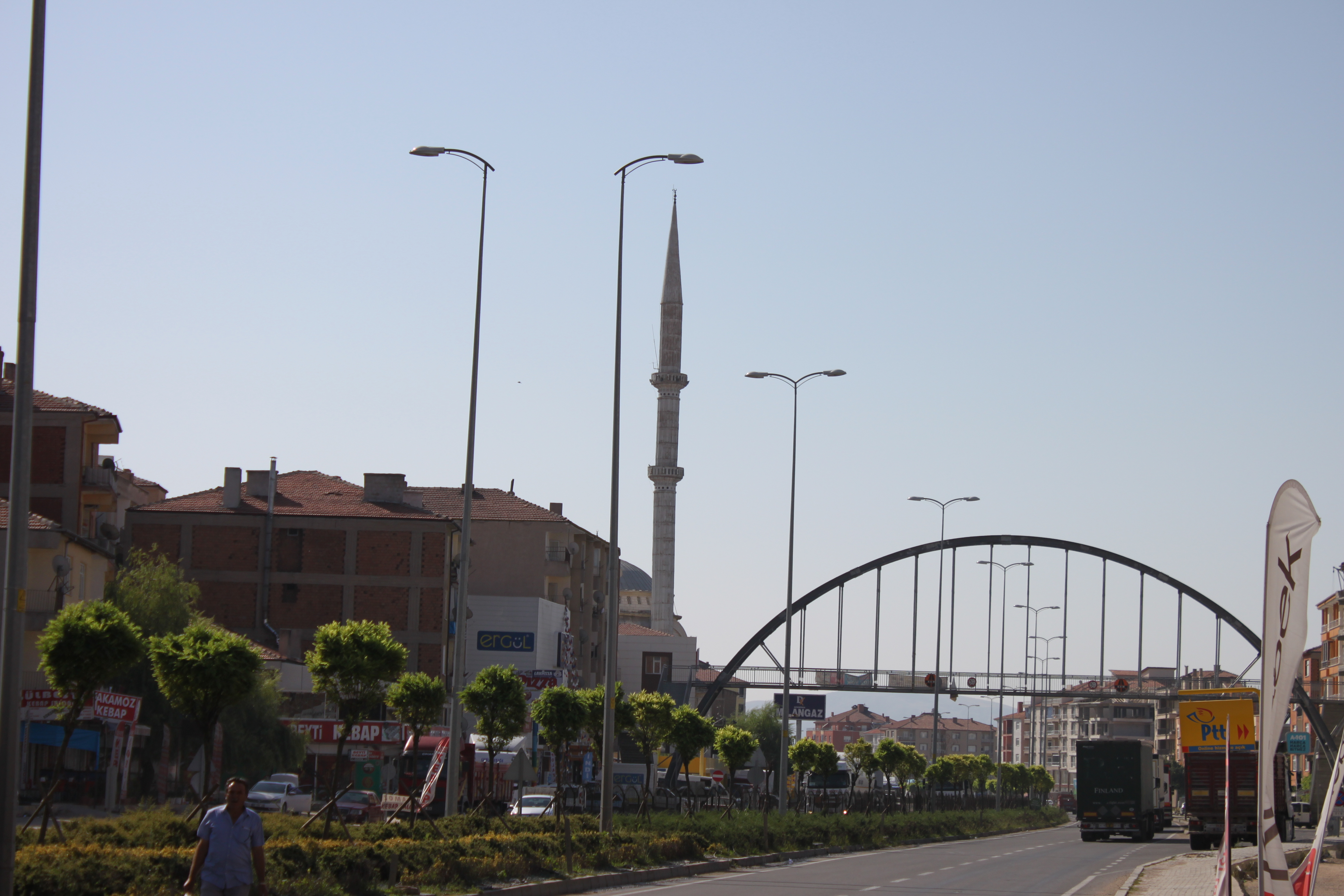
Street in Şereflikoçhisar

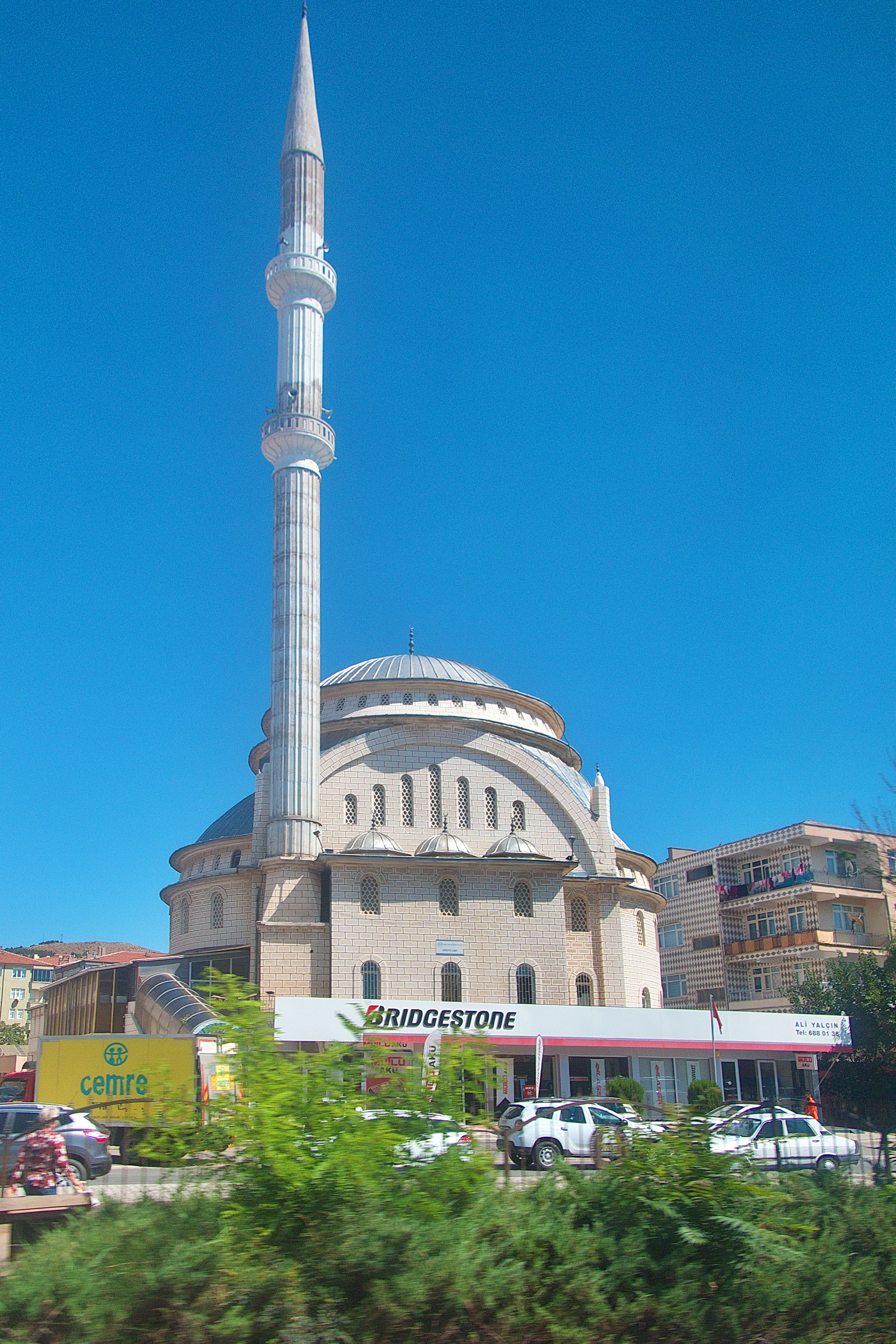
Şereflikoçhisar Mosque

== Composition ==
There are 64 neighbourhoods in Şereflikoçhisar District:

- Acıkuyu
- Acıöz
- Akarca
- Akin
- Akseki
- Aktaş
- Aliuşağı
- Bağobası
- Baltalı
- Boğaziçi
- Büyükdamlacık
- Büyükkışla
- Çalören
- Çatçat
- Çavuşköy
- Çayırönü
- Cıngıl
- Cumhuriyet
- Deliller
- Devekovan
- Doğankaya
- Ekici
- Eley
- Emek
- Fadıllı
- Geçitli
- Gülhüyük
- Hacıbektaşlı
- Hacıenbiya
- Hamzalı
- Haydarlı
- Hürriyet
- İstiklal
- Kacarlı
- Kadıncık
- Kadıobası
- Kale
- Karabük
- Karamollauşağı
- Karandere
- Küçükdamlacık
- Mehmet Akif Ersoy
- Mustafacık
- Musular
- Odunboğazı
- Palazobası
- Parlasan
- Sadıklı
- Sanayi
- Şanlıkışla
- Sarıkaya
- Şekerköy
- Şereflidavutlu
- Şeyh Kuyusu
- Şeyhli
- Seymenli
- Tuzla
- Üzengilik
- Yalnızpınar
- Yazısöğüt
- Yeni
- Yeşilova
- Yeşilyurt
- Yusufkuyusu
