= Tsaghkots =

Tsaghkots Ծաղկոց
- Location within Armenia
- Coordinates: 40°47′3″N 44°22′25″E
- Country: Armenia
- Province: Lori
- Elevation: 1,600 m (5,200 ft)

Population (2011)
  - Total: 33
- Time zone: UTC+4

Tsaghkots (Armenian: Ծաղկոց)), is an abandoned village in the Lori Province of Armenia.
