= Seymenli, Şereflikoçhisar =

Seymenli
- Neighbourhood
- Country: Turkey
- Province: Ankara
- District: Şereflikoçhisar
- Population (2022): 74
- Time zone: UTC+3 (TRT)

Seymenli is a neighbourhood in the municipality and district of Şereflikoçhisar, Ankara Province, Turkey. Its population is 74 (2022).
