= Çatalören, Bala =

Çatalören
- Neighbourhood
- Location in Turkey Çatalören (Turkey Central Anatolia)
- Coordinates: 39.4869°N 33.1762°E
- Country: Turkey
- Province: Ankara
- District: Bala
- Population (2022): 264
- Time zone: UTC+3 (TRT)

Çatalören is a neighbourhood in the municipality and district of Bala, Ankara Province, Turkey. As of 2022, its population was 264 people.
