= Kesikköprü, Bala =

Kesikköprü
- Neighbourhood
- Location in Turkey Kesikköprü (Turkey Central Anatolia)
- Coordinates: 39°23′43″N 33°24′5″E
- Country: Turkey
- Province: Ankara
- District: Bala
- Population (2022): 734
- Time zone: UTC+3 (TRT)

Kesikköprü (also: G.O.Paşa), formerly known as Saniana, is a neighbourhood in the municipality and district of Bala, Ankara Province, Turkey. Its population is 734 (2022). It was an independent municipality until it was merged into the municipality of Bala in 2008. The village is populated by Kurds.
