= Afşar, Bala =

Afşar
- Neighbourhood
- Location in Turkey Afşar (Turkey Central Anatolia)
- Coordinates: 39.4509°N 33.0649°E
- Country: Turkey
- Province: Ankara
- District: Bala
- Population (2022): 1,527
- Time zone: UTC+3 (TRT)

Afşar is a neighbourhood in the municipality and district of Bala, Ankara Province, Turkey. Its population is 1,527 (2022). Before the 2013 reorganisation, it was a town (belde).
