= Bumsuz, Haymana =

Bumsuz
- Neighbourhood
- Location in Turkey Bumsuz (Turkey Central Anatolia)
- Coordinates: 39°10′11″N 32°41′14″E
- Country: Turkey
- Province: Ankara
- District: Haymana
- Population (2022): 570
- Time zone: UTC+3 (TRT)

Bumsuz is a neighbourhood in the municipality and district of Haymana, Ankara Province, Turkey. Its population is 570 (2022). Before the 2013 reorganisation, it was a town (belde).

The town is populated by Kurds.
