= Balçıkhisar, Haymana =

Balçıkhisar
- Neighbourhood
- Location in Turkey Balçıkhisar (Turkey Central Anatolia)
- Coordinates: 39.2625°N 32.7622°E
- Country: Turkey
- Province: Ankara
- District: Haymana
- Population (2022): 598
- Time zone: UTC+3 (TRT)

Balçıkhisar is a neighbourhood in the municipality and district of Haymana, Ankara Province, Turkey. Its population is 598 (2022). Before the 2013 reorganisation, it was a town (belde).

The town is populated by Kurds.
