= Kacarlı, Şereflikoçhisar =

Kacarlı
- Neighbourhood
- Location in Turkey Kacarlı (Turkey Central Anatolia)
- Coordinates: 39°05′17″N 33°31′36″E
- Country: Turkey
- Province: Ankara
- District: Şereflikoçhisar
- Population (2022): 286
- Time zone: UTC+3 (TRT)

Kacarlı is a neighbourhood in the municipality and district of Şereflikoçhisar, Ankara Province, Turkey. Its population is 286 (2022). Before the 2013 reorganisation, it was a town (belde).
