= Yamak, Haymana =

Yamak
- Neighbourhood
- Location in Turkey Yamak (Turkey Central Anatolia)
- Coordinates: 39°20′N 32°31′E
- Country: Turkey
- Province: Ankara
- District: Haymana
- Population (2022): 141
- Time zone: UTC+3 (TRT)

Yamak is a neighbourhood in the municipality and district of Haymana, Ankara Province, Turkey. Its population is 141 (2022).

The village is populated by Kurds.
