= Çalış, Haymana =

Çalış
- Neighbourhood
- Location in Turkey Çalış (Turkey Central Anatolia)
- Coordinates: 39.3749°N 32.7057°E
- Country: Turkey
- Province: Ankara
- District: Haymana
- Population (2022): 433
- Time zone: UTC+3 (TRT)

Çalış is a neighbourhood in the municipality and district of Haymana, Ankara Province, Turkey. Its population is 433 (2022). Before the 2013 reorganisation, it was a town (belde).
