= Türkhüyük, Haymana =

Türkhüyük
- Neighbourhood
- Location in Turkey Türkhüyük (Turkey Central Anatolia)
- Coordinates: 39°33′N 32°24′E
- Country: Turkey
- Province: Ankara
- District: Haymana
- Population (2022): 43
- Time zone: UTC+3 (TRT)

Türkhüyük is a neighbourhood in the municipality and district of Haymana, Ankara Province, Turkey. Its population is 43 (2022).
