= Haymana =

- District and municipality
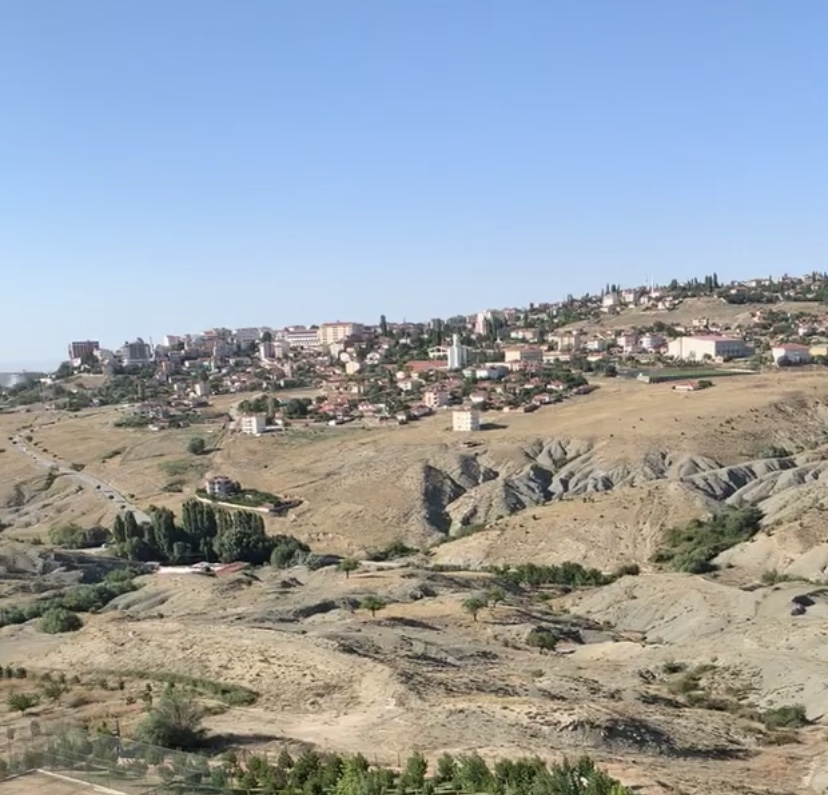

- Logo

- Map showing Haymana District in Ankara Province

- Location within Turkey Location within Turkey Central Anatolia
- Coordinates: 39°25′52″N 32°29′44″E
- Country: Turkey
- Province: Ankara

Government
  - Mayor: Levent Koç (CHP)
- Area: 2,164 km^{2} (836 sq mi)
- Elevation: 1,200 m (3,900 ft)
- Population (2022): 26,016
  - Density: 12.02/km^{2} (31.14/sq mi)
- Time zone: UTC+3 (TRT)
- Postal code: 06860
- Area code: 0312
- Website: www.haymana.bel.tr

Haymana is a municipality and district of Ankara Province, Turkey. Its area is 2,164 km^{2}, and its population is 26,016 (2022). It is 72 km south of the capital, Ankara. Its elevation is 1200 m.

== Etymology ==
According to the 1074-dated dictionary Dīwān ul-Lughat al-Turk, haymana means prairie in Turkish.

== History ==
Archaeological excavations were launched in Gavur Kalesi, a castle situated in the village of Dereköy, in the years 1930 and 1998. The results showed that it was an important Phrygian settlement. Besides, the tumuli located in Türkhöyük and Oyaca villages prove that the area was also inhabited during the Hittite period.

After the periods of the Roman and Byzantine rule, the area was captured by the Seljuk Turks in 1127. After the Battle of Köse Dağ it came under Ilkhanate control for a while. In the mid 14th century the area was annexed by the Ottomans. After a brief period of Timurid rule in the wake of the Battle of Ankara in 1402, it was re-captured by the Ottomans.

== Demographics ==
Historical population

Year	Pop.	±% p.a.
1881	23,356	—
1907	33,878	+1.44%
1940	35,130	+0.11%
1950	41,379	+1.65%
1965	48,908	+1.12%
1970	51,256	+0.94%
1975	53,275	+0.78%
1980	56,171	+1.06%

Year	Pop.	±% p.a.
1985	60,823	+1.60%
1990	55,527	−1.81%
2000	54,087	−0.26%
2007	39,310	−4.46%
2012	31,058	−4.60%
2017	27,277	−2.56%
2022	26,016	−0.94%

Source: TÜIK (2007-2022)

=== Age structure ===
The district of Haymana has a relatively young population but it is ageing very quickly.

Population by age structure (2017)
1. 0-9 years old (12.5%)
2. 10-19 years old (14.5%)
3. 20-29 years old (12.6%)
4. 30-39 years old (12.0%)
5. 40-49 (12.2%)
6. 50-59 (14.5%)
7. 60-69 (12.4%)
8. 70-79 (6.40%)
9. aged 80 or more (2.90%)

== Composition ==
There are 78 neighbourhoods in Haymana District:

- Ahırlıkuyu
- Alaçık
- Alahacılı
- Altıpınar
- Ataköy
- Bahçecik
- Balçıkhisar
- Baltalin
- Boğazkaya
- Bostanhüyük
- Bumsuz
- Büyükkonak
- Büyükyağcı
- Çaldağ
- Çalış
- Çatak
- Çayraz
- Çeltikli
- Cihanşah
- Cingirli
- Culuk
- Demirözü
- Dereköy
- Deveci
- Devecipınarı
- Durupınar
- Durutlar
- Emirler
- Esen
- Eskikışla
- Evci
- Evliyafakı
- Gedik
- Gültepe
- Güzelcekale
- İncirli
- Kadıköy
- Karahoca
- Karapınar
- Karasüleymanlı
- Katrancı
- Kavakköy
- Kayabaşı
- Kerpiç
- Kesikkavak
- Kirazoğlu
- Kızılkoyunlu
- Küçükkonak
- Küçükyağcı
- Kutluhan
- Mandıra
- Medrese
- Saatli
- Sarıdeğirmen
- Sarıgöl
- Sazağası
- Şerefligökgöz
- Serinyayla
- Seyran
- Sinanlı
- Sındıran
- Sırçasaray
- Soğulca
- Söğüttepe
- Tabaklı
- Tepeköy
- Toyçayırı
- Türkhüyük
- Türkşerefli
- Yamak
- Yaprakbayırı
- Yaylabeyi
- Yeni
- Yeniköy
- Yergömü
- Yeşilköy
- Yukarısebil
- Yurtbeyli

== Sport ==
The 2023-established local women's football team Haymana plays in the topflight Women's Super League after earning promotion to a higher football league level each season since then.

== Prominent residents ==
- Ömer Özkan, Turkish plastic surgeon. An associate professor at the Akdeniz University in Antalya, he led the team that performed in 2012 the first full face transplant in Turkey.
- Burhan Sönmez, writer
- Haymana Prison has had notable residents as inmates over the years, including historian Fikret Başkaya, professor of foreign relations Haluk Gerger, Workers' Party (Turkey) leader Doğu Perinçek, political scientist Yalçın Küçük, and playwright Bilgesu Erenus (the latter two jointly published their Haymana memoirs).
