= Şêxbizin (tribe) =

Kurdish tribe, originally from East Kurdistan

Şêxbizin (Kurdish: شێخ بزنی, romanized: Şêxbizinî) is a Kurdish tribe present near Koy Sanjaq in Kurdistan Region, Iraq with smaller communities dispersed throughout Turkey. While the tribe speaks Sorani in Kurdistan Region, the ones in Turkey have kept their tribal sub-dialect of Laki called Şêxbizinî or Kirmancekîman. Nonetheless, many in Turkey only know Turkish due to the assimilatory policies of Turkey.

They lived around Kermanshah in present-day Iran but were expelled towards Ottoman Kirkuk by Safavid Ismail I in the 16th century. Many members of the tribe would later migrate towards Anatolia.

== Etymology ==
It is believed that the name of the tribe is a compound of the two words sheikh and Bazan. The latter is the name of the region near Sulaymaniyah where they were exiled to before relocating to Anatolia decades after. The name appears in different spellings in Ottoman documents.

== History ==
The tribe was caught between the many wars between the Ottomans and the Safavids in Kurdistan and were forced to leave towards Kirkuk by the Safavids after failed negotiations between Shah Ismail and Şêxbizinî leader Qazî Huseyn. The reason for the exile was the religious beliefs of the tribe since they were Sunni. Entering Ottoman Kurdistan, they were tolerated by Sultan Selim I since he was attempting to gather support from Sunni Kurdish tribes against the Safavids. Due to the support from the Şêxbizin during the Battle of Chaldiran, the tribe received privileges including the liberty to settle wherever they wanted. This allowed members of the tribe to migrate upward towards Anatolia after temporarily staying in Palu. Others suggested that Sultan Selim forced them to migrate to Anatolia from what later became the eastern zone of Iraqi Kurdistan. They were described as "descendants of southern Kurdish tribes re-settled in various parts of Anatolia in the 16th century." By the end of the 18th century, the tribe lived in Haymana during the winter and around Antalya, Samsun and Aydın in the summer.

In his work on Kurdish tribes in 1908, Mark Sykes mentioned the Şêxbizin tribe near Kirkuk which numbered around 4,000 families. He wrote:

A great and warlike tribe, turbulent and fierce. Noted robbers. Great horsemen. Very intelligent, make Martini–Henry rifles. Live in villages in winter, dwell in tents in the vicinity of their villages in spring.

Many Şêxbizin Kurds were Pêşmerge and fought with the Kurdish leader Mustefa Barzanî during the Iraqi–Kurdish conflict.

== Settlements ==
The Şêxbizin tribe lives in the following towns and villages:

=== Kurdistan Region ===
Villages populated by the Şêxbizin tribe in Erbil Governorate:

- Bengane
- Berdesipî
- Bincî
- Cedîde
- Dermanava Jêr
- Dermanava Jor
- Kanîya Suleyman
- Kasika
- Minare
- Xorxor

=== Ankara and Konya Provinces ===
Villages populated by the Şêxbizin tribe in Ankara Province and Konya Province in Turkey:

- Aktepe (in Haymana district)
- Altıpınar (in Haymana district)
- Ataköy (in Haymana district)
- Bahçecik (in Haymana district)
- Balçıkhisar (in Haymana district)
- Bostanhöyük (in Haymana district)
- Canımana (in Kulu district)
- Dereköy (in Haymana district)
- Dipdede (in Kulu district)
- Durutlar (in Haymana district)
- Eskikışla (in Haymana district)
- Evci (in Haymana district)
- Evliyafakı (in Haymana district)
- Gedik (in Haymana district)
- Gültepe (in Haymana district)
- Kanlıgöl (in Haymana district - depopulated in 1960 after a blood feud)
- Karacadere (in Kulu district)
- Karaömerli (in Haymana district)
- Karapınar (in Haymana district)
- Kavak (in Haymana district)
- Kayabaşı (in Polatlı district)
- İncirli (in Haymana district)
- Pınarbaşı (in Haymana district)
- Sarıgöl (in Haymana district)
- Sazağası (in Haymana district)
- Sinanlı (in Haymana district)
- Soğukkuyu (in Kulu district)
- Söğüttepe (in Haymana district)
- Tabaklı (in Haymana district)
- Yaprakbayır (in Haymana district)
- Sindiren (formerly known as Yenice, in Haymana district)
- Yergömü (in Haymana district)
- Yeşilköy (in Haymana district)
- Yukarısebil (in Haymana district)
- Yurtbeyli (in Haymana district)

=== Other provinces ===
Villages populated by the Şêxbizin tribe in Turkey outside of the provinces of Ankara and Konya:

- Bahçeköy (in the center district, Düzce Province)
- Bayamca (in Boyabat district, Sinop Province)
- Ballıca (in the center district, Düzce Province)
- Beygircioğlu (in Kargı district, Çorum Province)
- Binerli (in Boyabat district, Sinop Province)
- Çamlıpınar (in Laçin district, Çorum Province)
- Çayağzı (in Durağan district, Sinop Province)
- Dededağı (in Bafra district, Kastamonu Province)
- Dumanoğlu (in Aşkale district, Erzurum Province)
- Gemet (in the center district, Çorum Province)
- İçmeler (in Gölyaka district, Düzce Province)
- İğdeli (in Oltu district, Erzurum Province)
- Karasoku (in Laçin district, Çorum Province)
- Mamure (in the center district, Düzce Province)
- Meşepınarı (in Karapürçek district, Sakarya Province)
- Olukbaşı (in Durağan district, Sinop Province)
- Paşakonağı (in the center district, Düzce Province)
- Sıtma (in Laçin district, Çorum Province)
- Tekpınar (in Ispir district, Erzurum Province)
- Tektaban (in Karapürçek district, Sakarya Province)
- Topkaynak (in Oltu district, Erzurum Province
- Yarmankaya (in Tortum district, Erzurum Province)
- Yazılıgürgen (in Karapürçek district, Sakarya Province)
- Yeniköy (in Boyabat district, Sinop Province)
- Yenitaşköprü (in the center district, Düzce Province)
- Yeşilyurt (in Boyabat district, Sinop Province)
- Yüksel (in Karapürçek district, Sakarya Province)

=== Europe ===
There is a Şêxbizin community in Austria, Denmark, Germany and France.

== See also ==
- Reşwan (tribe)

== Notes ==
- Çelebî, Cemile (2017), "Bezeynî – Historie, Migration, Diaspora und linguistische Besonderheiten" (PDF), Wiener Jahrbuch für Kurdische Studien (in German) (5)
- Dr. Mikaîlî (2020), "Îskana kurdên şexbezenî (şêxbizin) li Anatolîyê" (PDF), Bîrnebûn (in Kurdish) (76), ISSN 1402-7488
- Fiğan, Mehmet (2017), Etnik Sınırlarda Gezinmek: Haymanalı Kürtlerin Kimliklenme ve Kültürlerarası İletişim Pratikleri (PDF) (in Turkish), Hacettepe University
- Turkish state (2014), Aşiretler Raporu (in Turkish) (3 ed.), Kaynak Yayınları, ISBN 978-975-343-220-7
- Ruciyar, Baran (2008), Allgemeine Geschichte: Şêx Bizin (in German), Kurdica, archived from the original on 2012-10-22
- Sykes, Mark (1908), "The Kurdish Tribes of the Ottoman Empire", The Journal of the Royal Anthropological Institute of Great Britain and Ireland, 38, Royal Anthropological Institute of Great Britain and Ireland: 451–486, doi:10.2307/2843309, JSTOR 2843309
