= Fossil flora of Kızılcahamam district =

- Stratigraphic range: Pliocene

Location
- Coordinates: 40.61°N 32.68°E
- Region: Kızılcahamam District, Ankara Province
- Country: Turkey
- Fossil flora of Kızılcahamam district (Turkey)

This fossil flora in Turkey stems from at least six Pliocene deposits in Güvem and Beşkonak villages, 80 kilometres (50 mi) north of Ankara, 22 kilometres (14 mi) north of Kızılcahamam and 125 kilometres (78 mi) south of the Black Sea coast. They are 1,000 metres (3,300 ft) to 1,500 metres (4,900 ft) above sea level, extending 15 kilometres (9.3 mi) north-south and 7 kilometres (4.3 mi) east-west. Between six and seven million years ago, a fresh water lake existed there in a forested area with mostly broad leaved deciduous tree species, dominated by sequoia and oak.

The Turkish botany Professor Baki Kasaplıgil (1918-1992) from Çankırı who worked at the Biology Department, Mills College, Oakland, California from 1956 to 1992, made fossil collecting trips to the area around Kızılcahamam - Çerkeş road in 1964 and 1968. In the 1964 trip he collected fossil leaves of Glyptostrobus, Sequoia, Zelkova, Fagus, Carpinus, Ulmus, Quercus, Tilia and Acer. In the 1968 trip, he collected 400 plant parts such as leaves, seeds, fruits, twigs and branches. He also collected 50 fossils of frog and fish skeletons and larvae and insects. In 1969, Wayne Fry from University of Berkeley made plant fossil collections in Güvem. Daniel I. Axelrod also assisted in the research of this flora.

== Images of the fossil plants and fossil sites ==
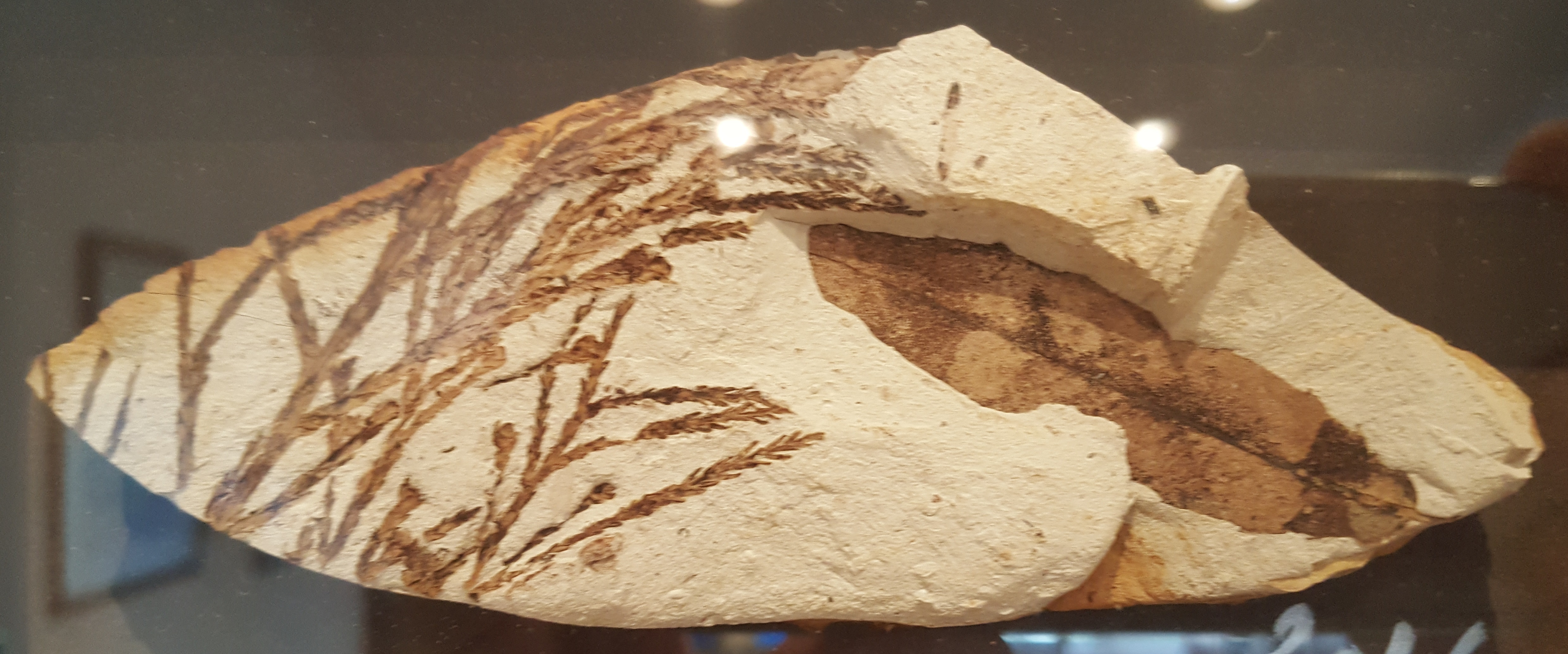
Leaf fossils of Glyptostrobus europaeus (left) and Quercus drymeya (right) from the Pliocene of Kizilcahamam, found near Belpınar village by Osman Güldemir, a teacher at the Anadolu University in Eskişehir, Turkey.

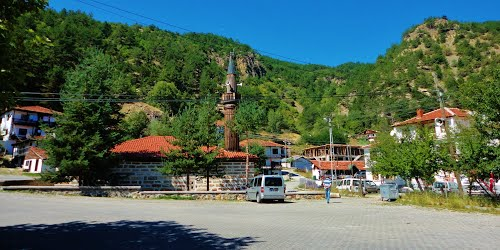
Güvem village with the Seyhamamı mosque.

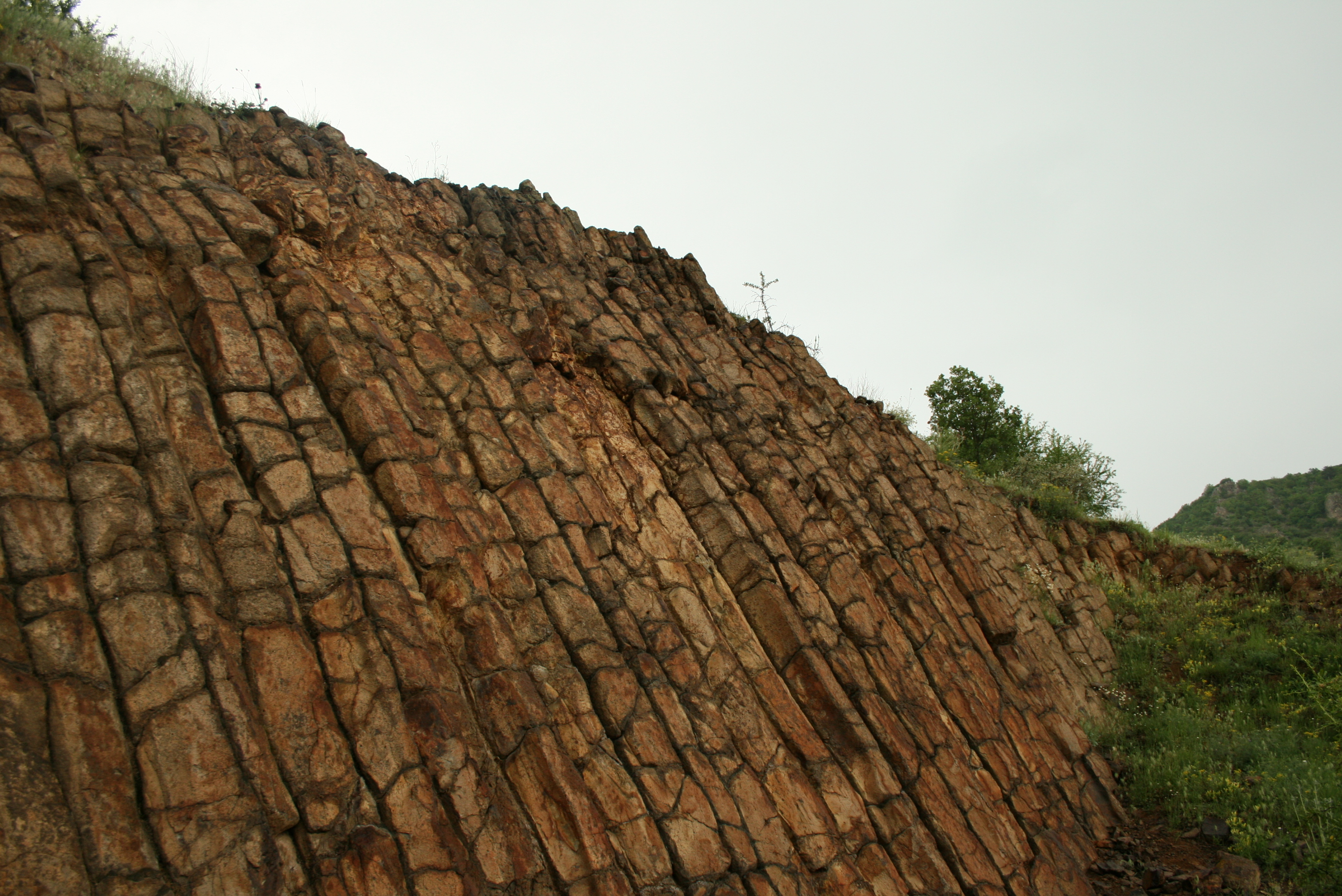
Columnar basalt formed by lava flows at Beşkonak village.

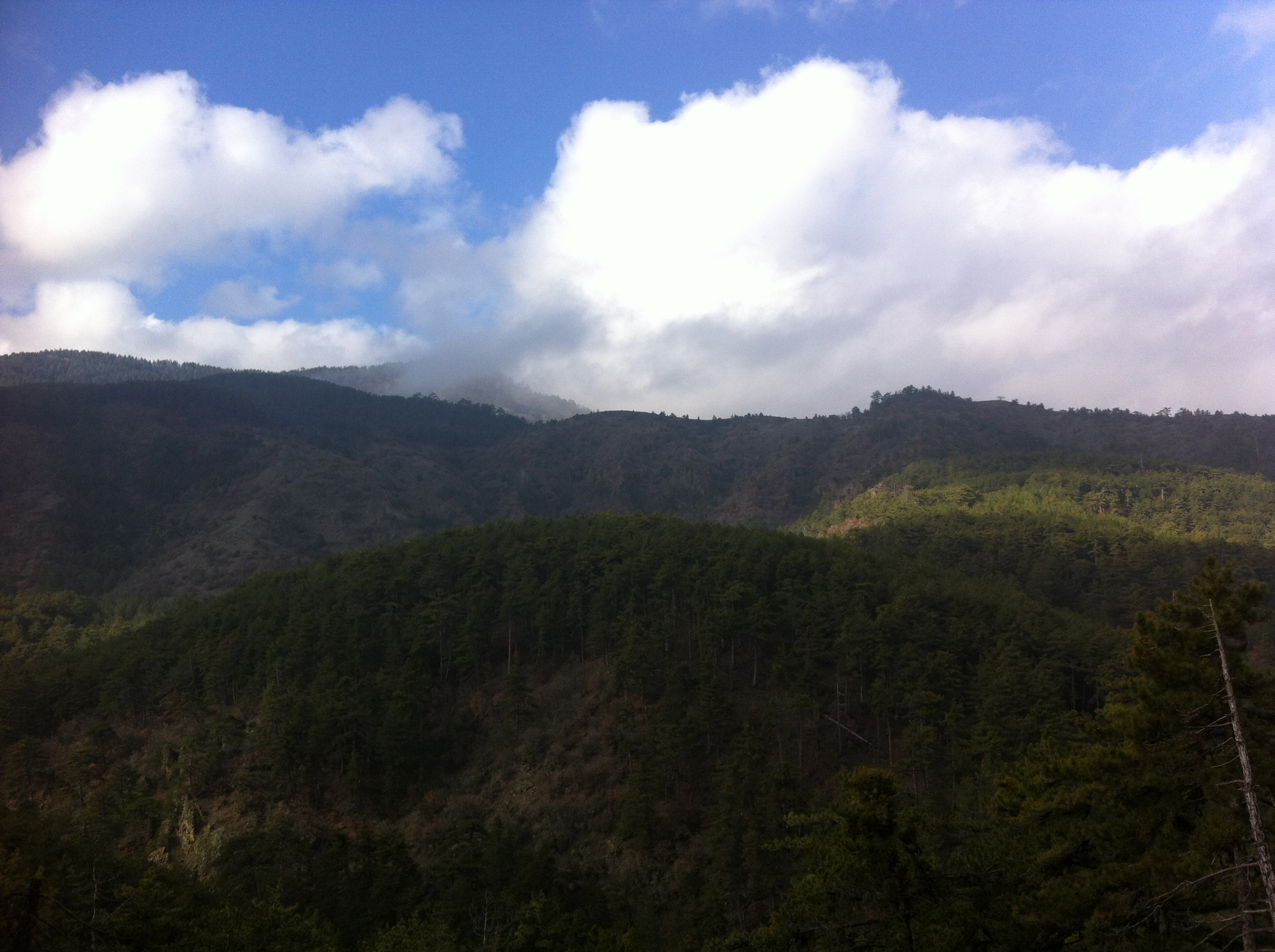
Due to drying and cooling of the climate at the onset of the Pleistocene ice age in Kizilcahamam, the Sequoia forests with their many exotic plant species disappeared and have now been replaced by Scots pine (Pinus sylvestris) forests.

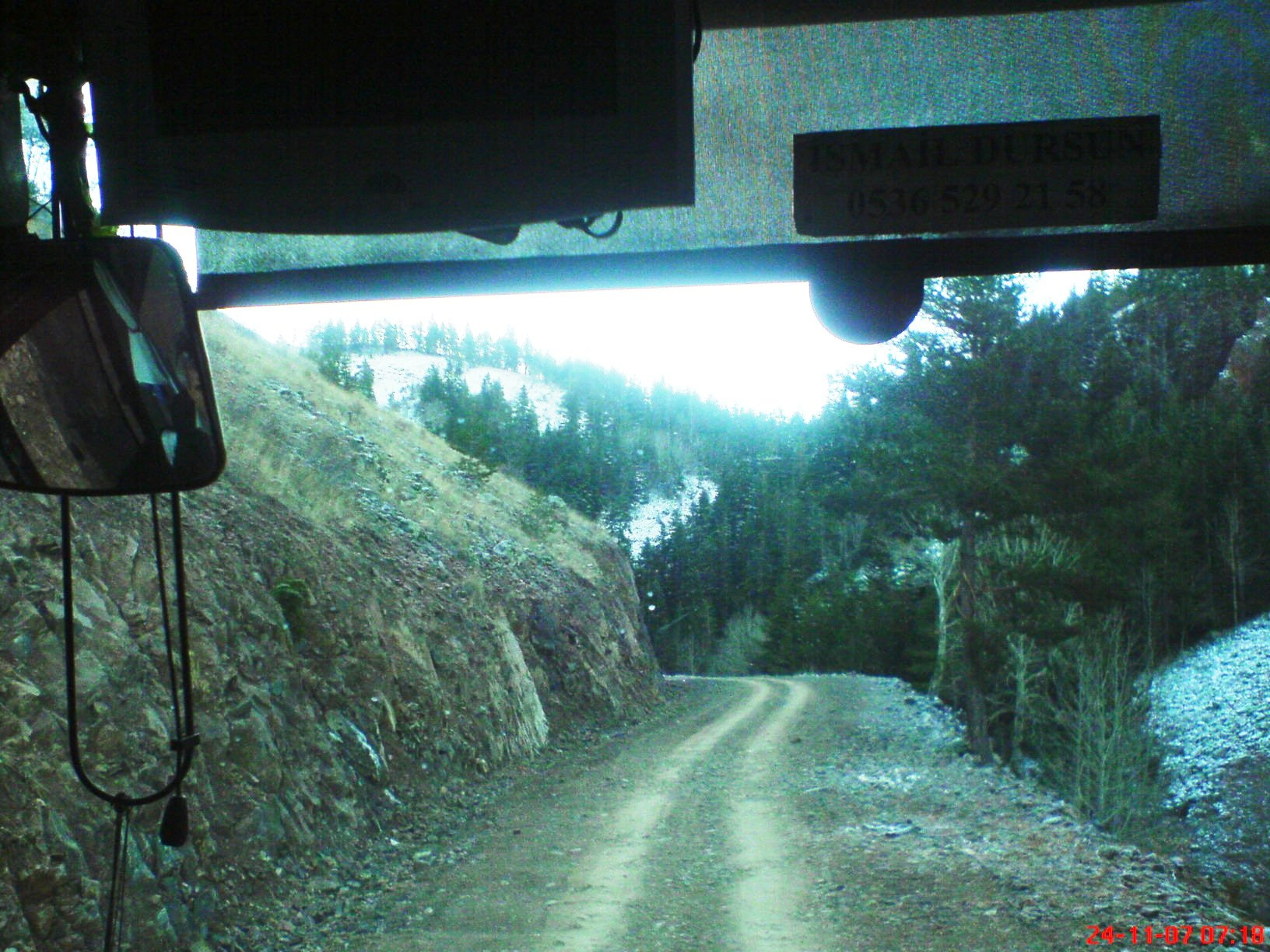
Professor Baki Kasaplıgil collected many of his fossil specimens along dirt roads that had newly been made by a bulldozer.

== Fossil plant species so far described from the deposits ==
=== Pteridophyta ===
- Salviniaceae

- Salvinia sp.

- Pteridaceae

- Cryptogramma aff. crispo

=== Gymnosperms ===
- Cupressaceae

- †Glyptostrobus europaeus

- †Sequoia langsdorfi

- Pinaceae

- Pinus canariensis

- Pinus morrisonicola

- Tsuga sp.

- Ephedraceae

- Ephedra sp.

=== Angiosperms, dicots ===
- Cercidiphyllaceae

- †Cercidiphyllum crenatum

- Magnoliaceae

- Magnolia sprengeri

- Menispermaceae

- Menispermum sp.

- Lauraceae

- Persea indica

- Platanaceae

- Platanus sp.

- Juglandaceae

- †Platycarya miocenica

- Pterocarya fraxinifolia

- Salicaceae

- Salix sp.

- Populus tremula

- Myricaceae

- Comptonia sp.

- Myrica banksiaefolia

- Fagaceae

- Castanea sp.

- Castanopsis sp.

- Fagus sp.

- †Quercus drymeja
- †Quercus heidingeri
- †Quercus kubinyi
- †Quercus aff. lonchitis
- Quercus petroela aff.
- Quercus sclerophyllina
- Quercus semecarpifolia
- †Quercus seyfriedii (very similar to Quercus phellos from eastern and central United States)
- †Quercus sosnoisky
- Quercus hartwissiana
- Quercus trojana aff.

- Betulaceae

- Alnus sp.

- Betula luminifera aff.

- Carpinus miocenica

- Sapindaceae

- †Acer angustilobum
- †Acer tribolatum

- Anacardiaceae

- Astronium sp.

- Ebenaceae

- Diospyros aff. miokaki

- Aquifoliaceae

- Ilex gracilis (close to Ilex serrata)

- Rosaceae

- Sorbus aucuparia aff.

- Fabaceae

- Cercis sp.

- †Sophora sp.

- Malvaceae

- Tilia platyphyllos aff,

- Ulmaceae

- Ulmus sp.

- †Zelkova ungeri

- Berberidaceae

- Berberis chinensis aff.

- Moraceae

- Ficus sp.

- Altingiaceae

- †Liquidambar europaeum

- Simaroubaceae

- Ailanthus altissima aff.

=== Angiosperms, monocots ===
- Smilaceae

- Smilax aspera

- Potamogetonaceae

- Potamogeton sp.

- Hydrocharitaceae

- Egeria densa aff.

- Najas sp.

- Typhaceae

- Typha sp.

== Images of some extant close relatives of the fossil species ==
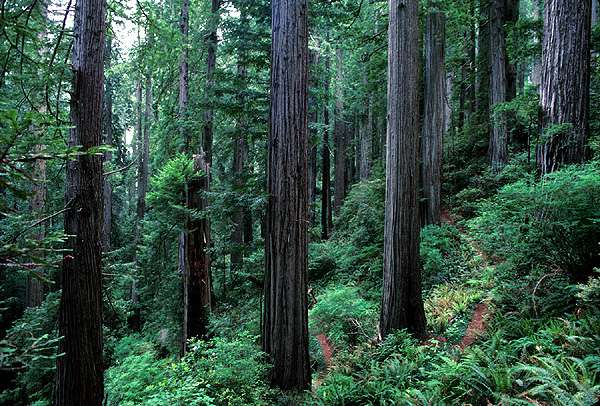
Sequoia, giant redwood forests were common at higher altitudes of Anatolia in the Tertiary and early Pleistocene.

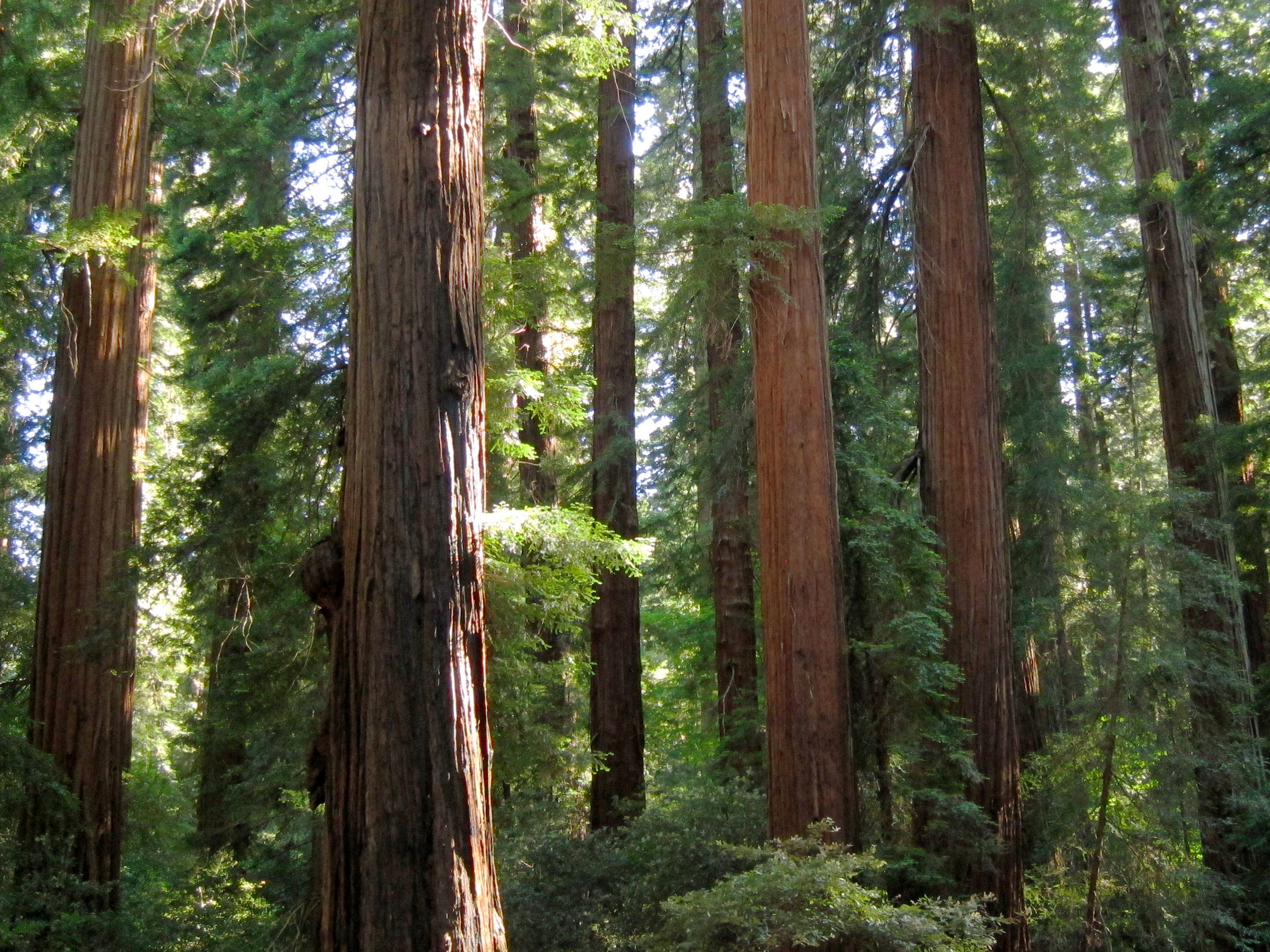
Sequoia

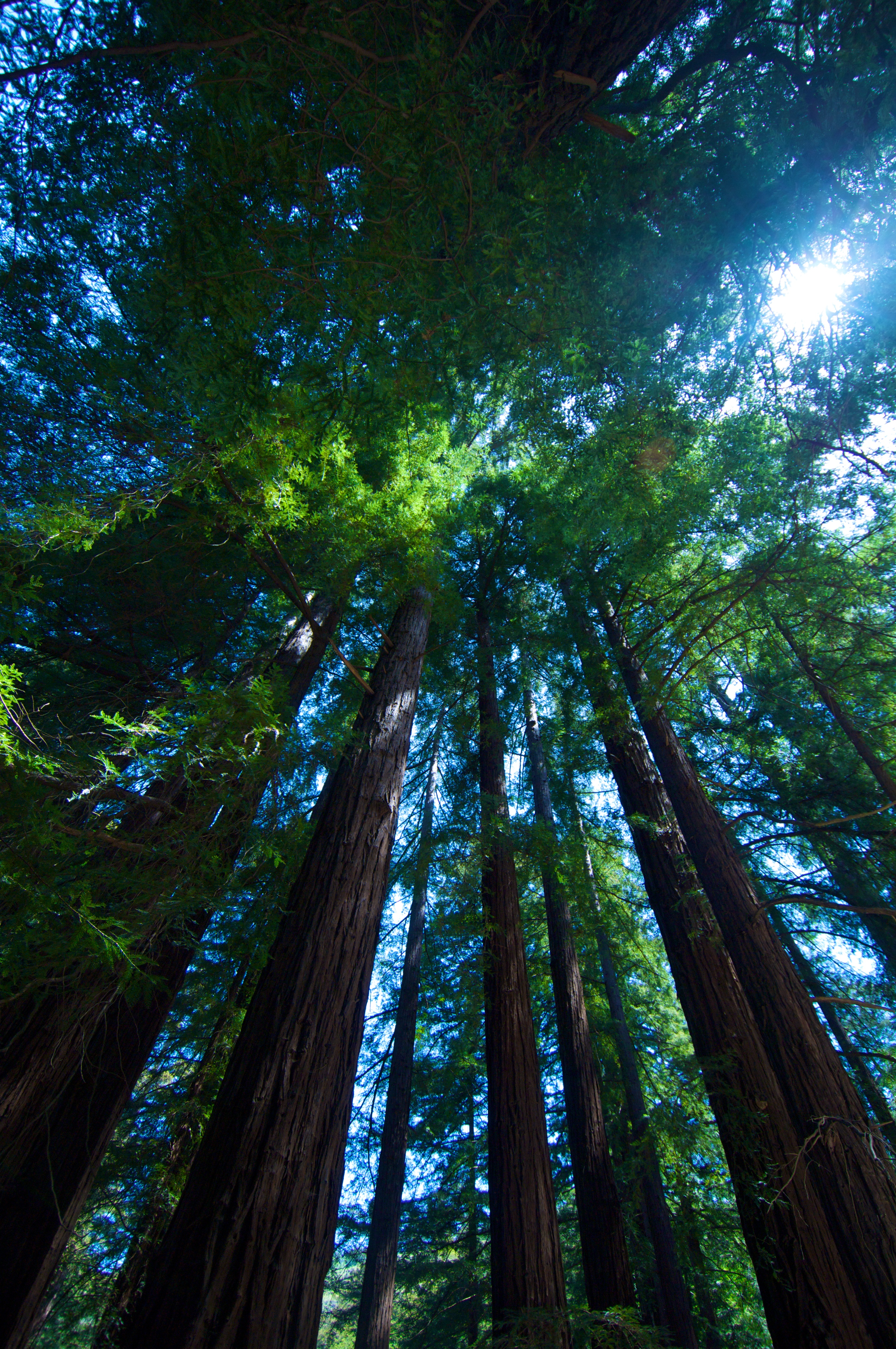
Sequoia

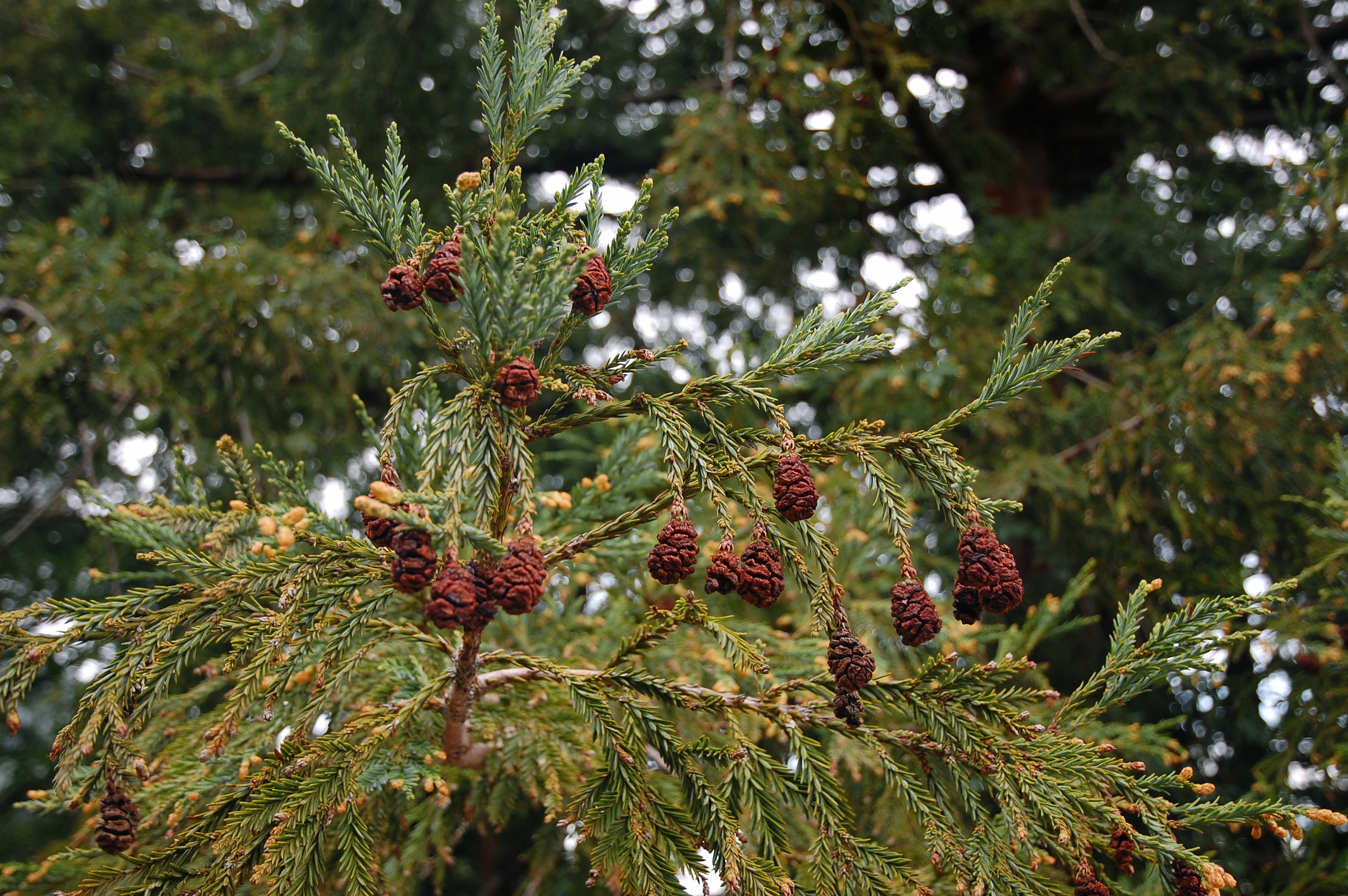
Sequoia branch of seed cones.

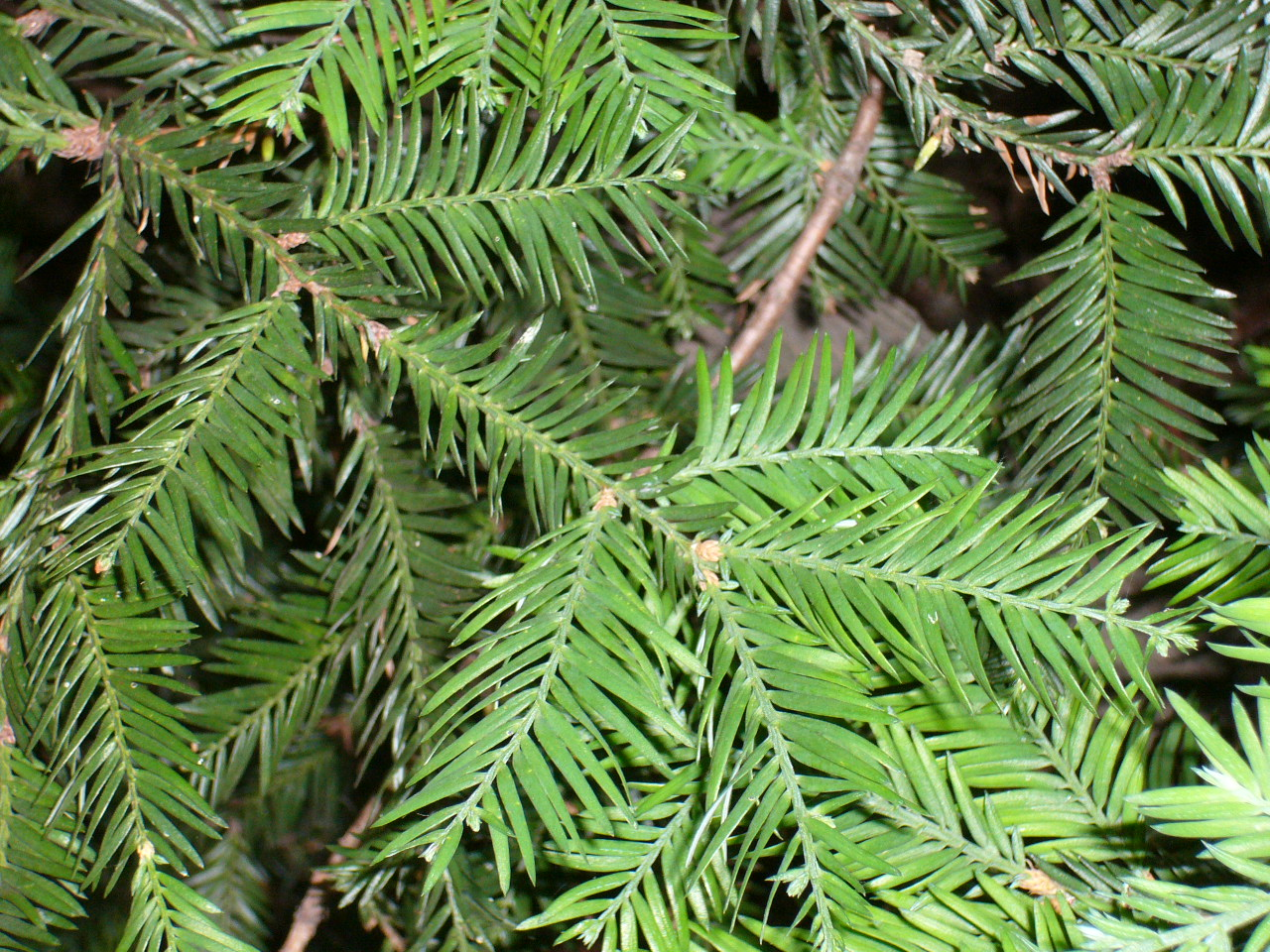
Sequoia

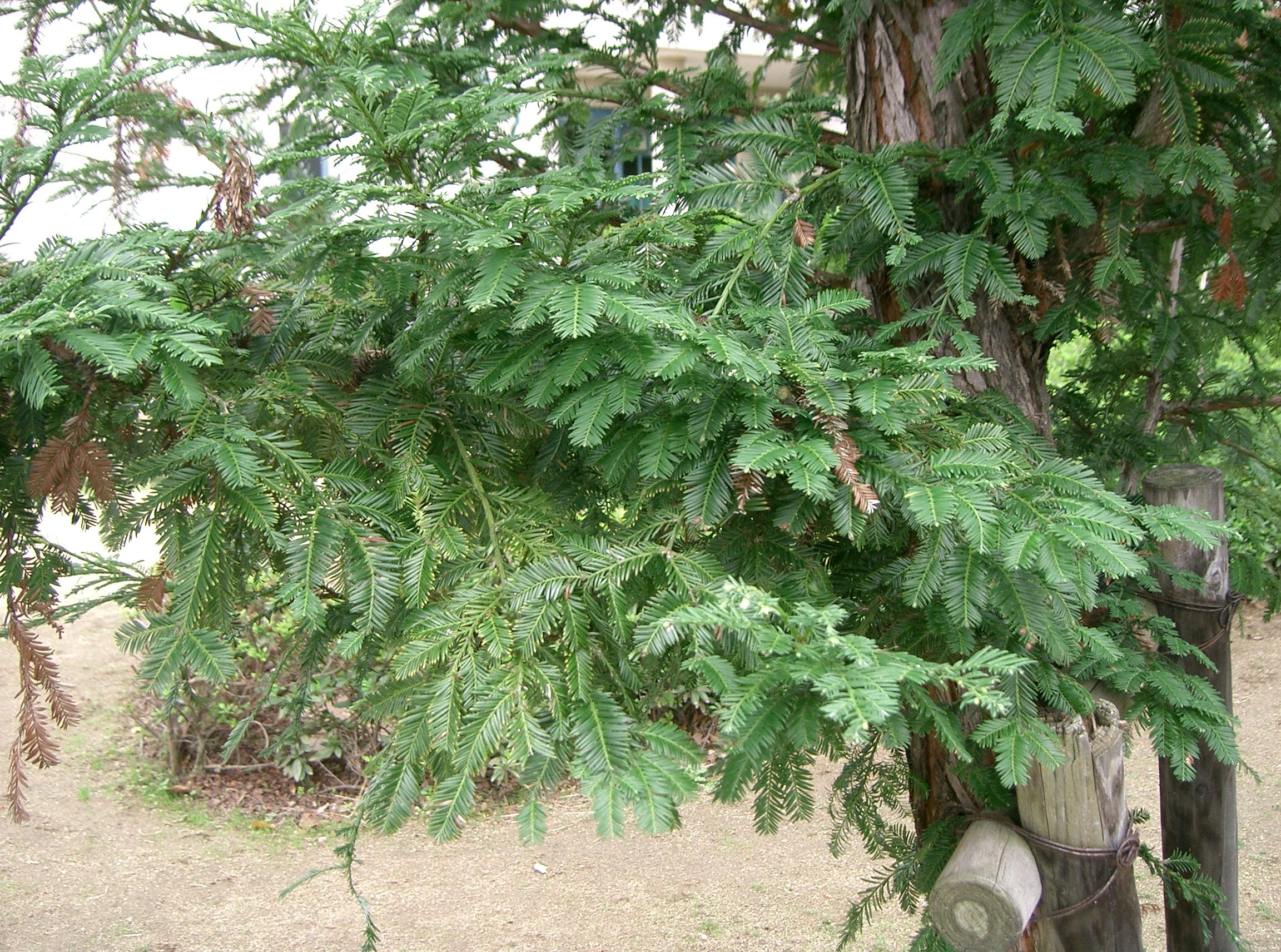
Sequoia

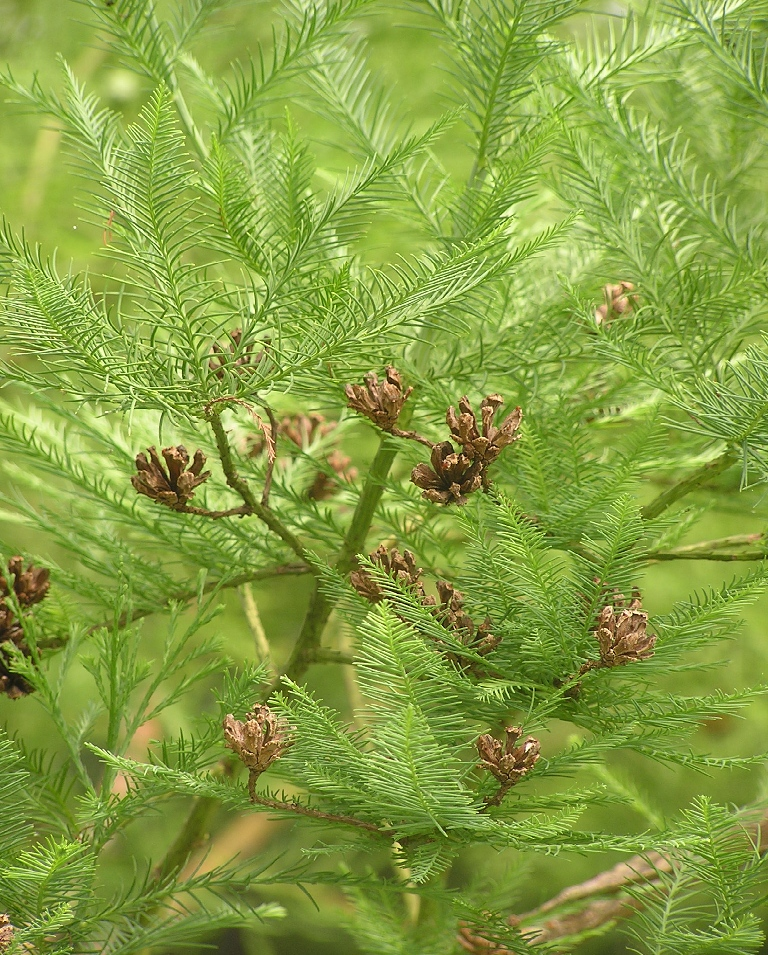
Glyptostrobus europaeus may have survived in some refugia pockets of wetlands along Turkey's Black Sea coast until the early Holocene. Fossil Glyptostrobus europaeus pollen from early Holocene deposits prove such a recent existence of this species in Turkey. So recent fossil pollen have not been found in other countries bordering the Black Sea.

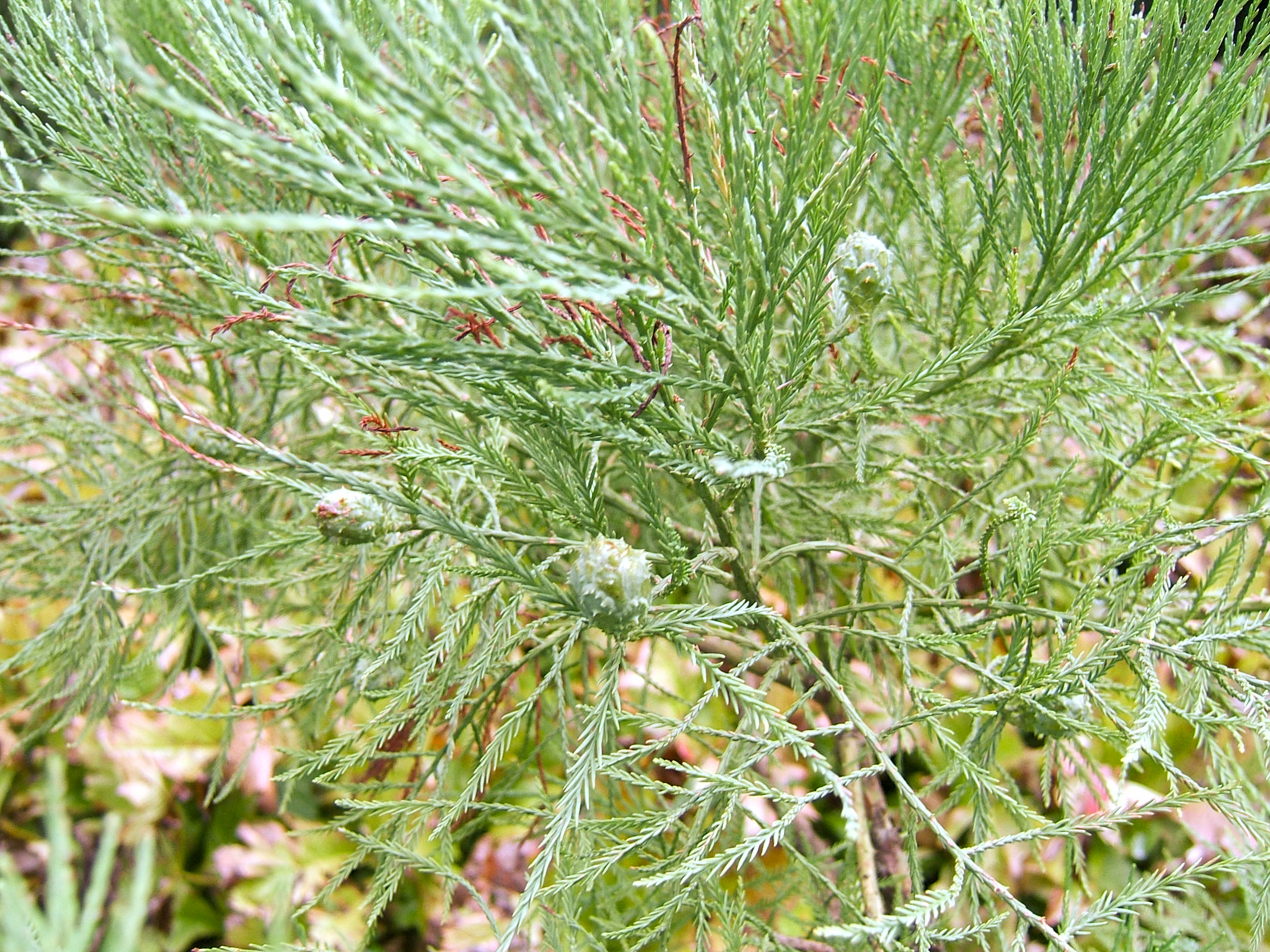
Glyptostrobus

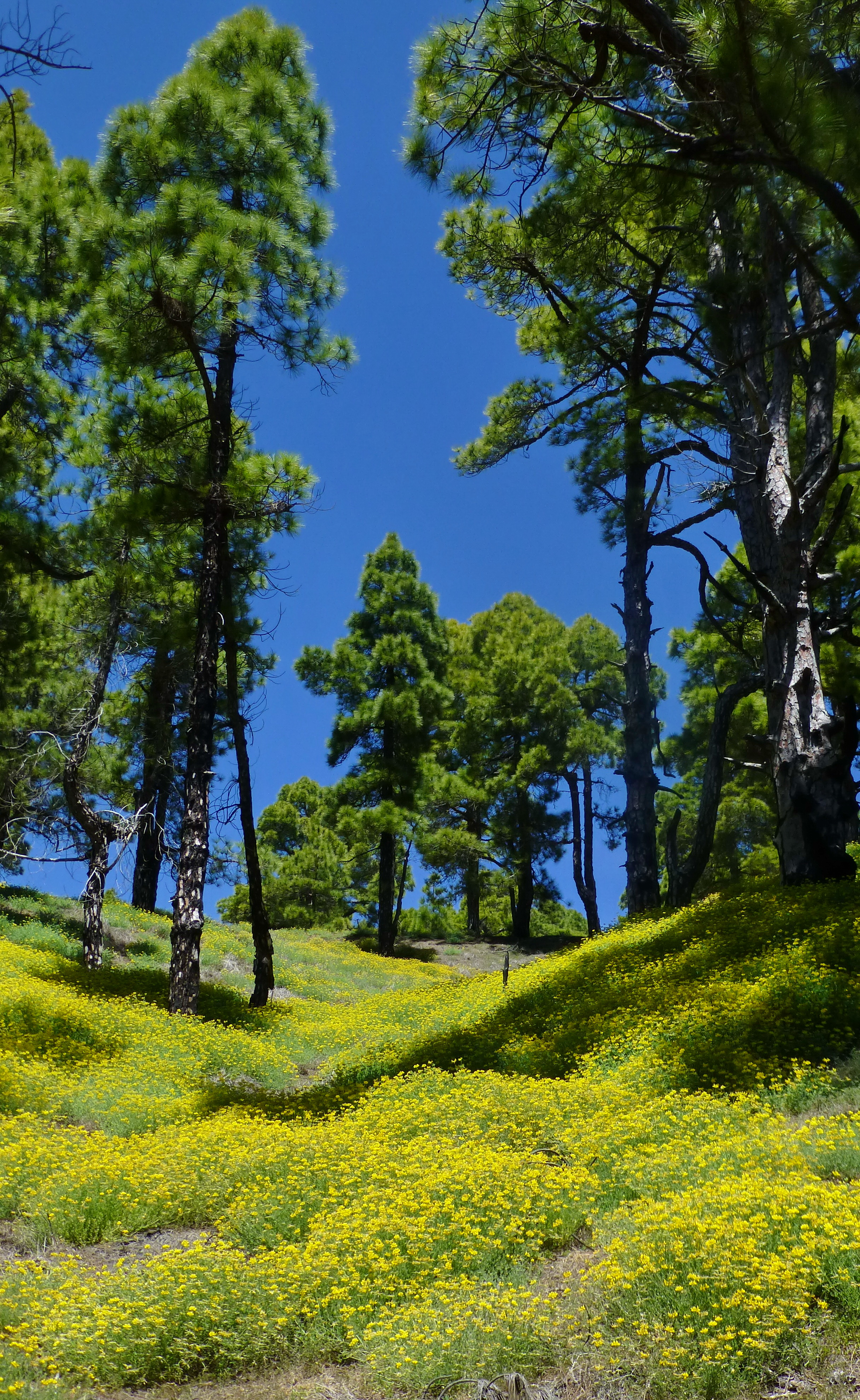
Pinus canariensis

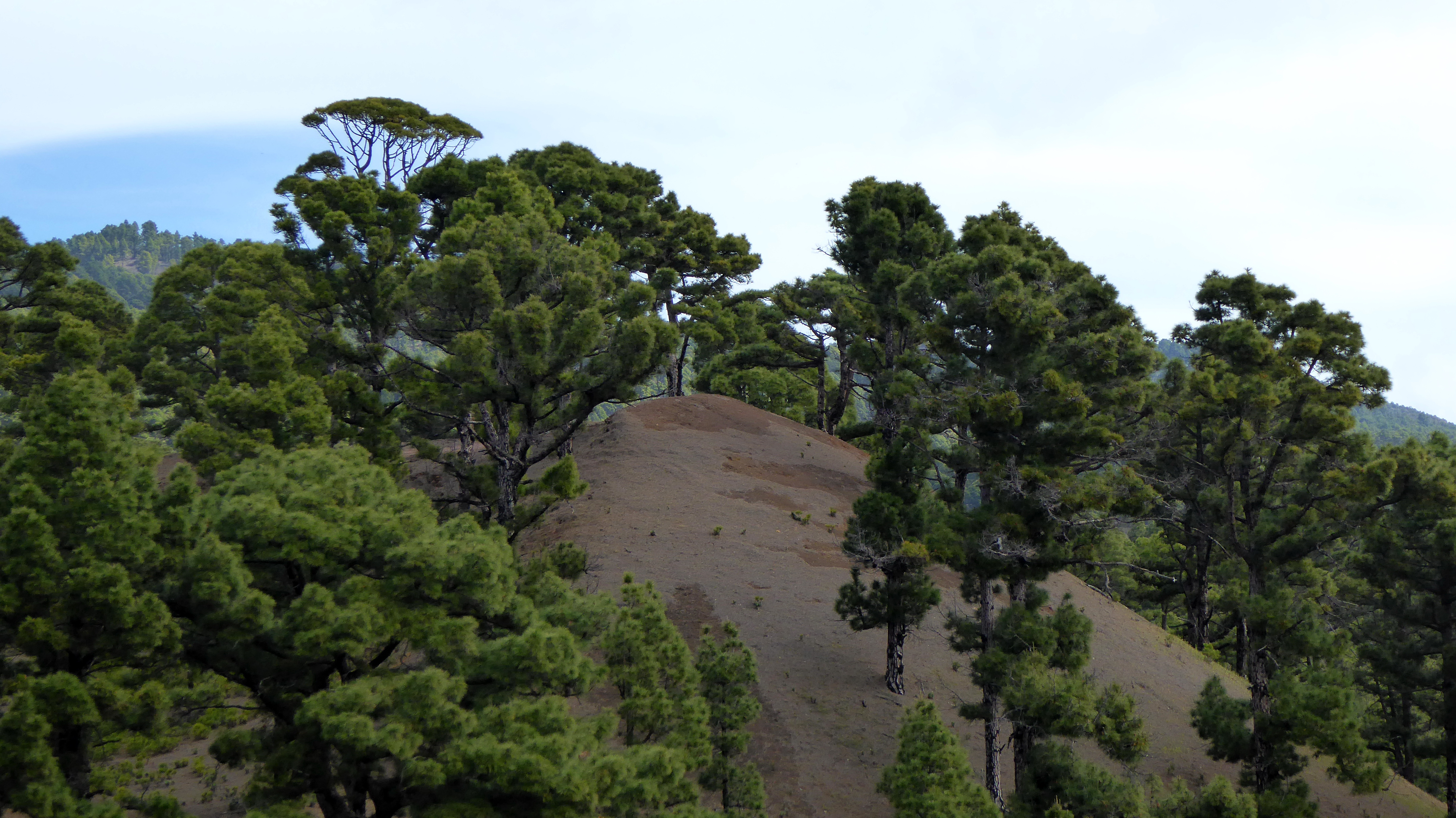
Pinus canariensis

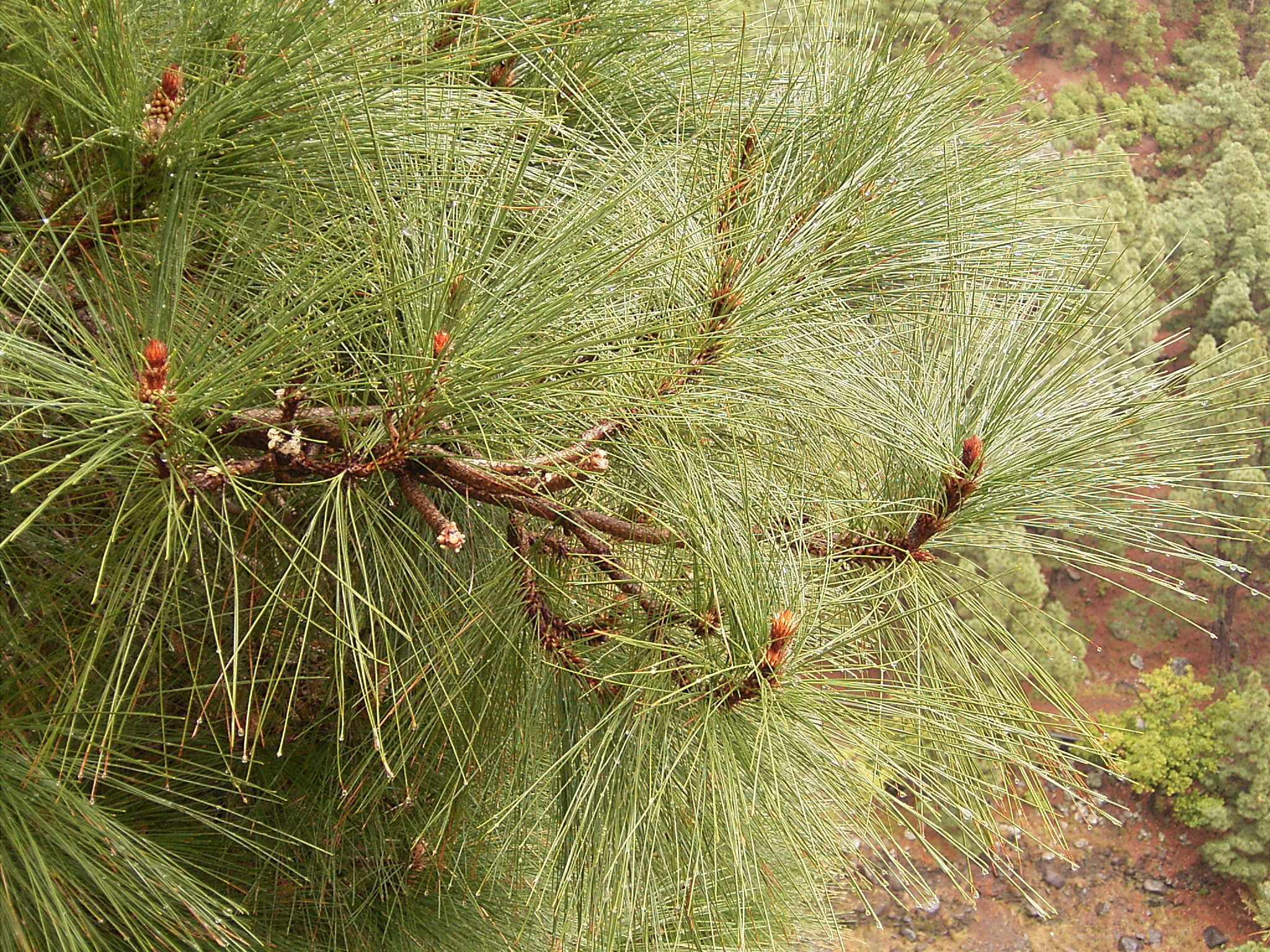
Pinus canariensis

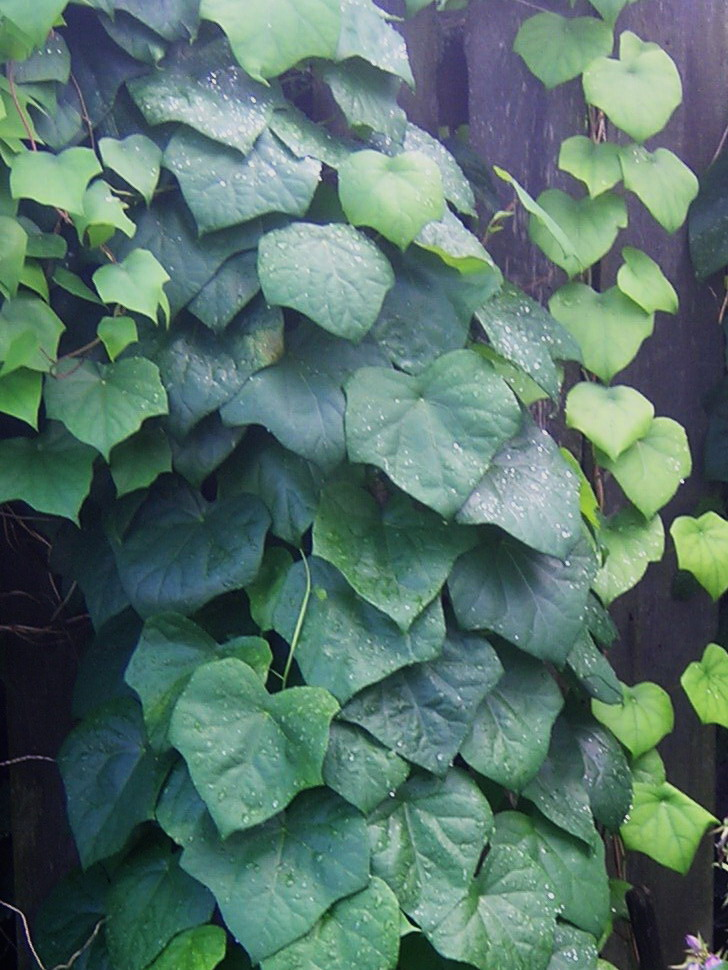
Menispermum dauricum leaves

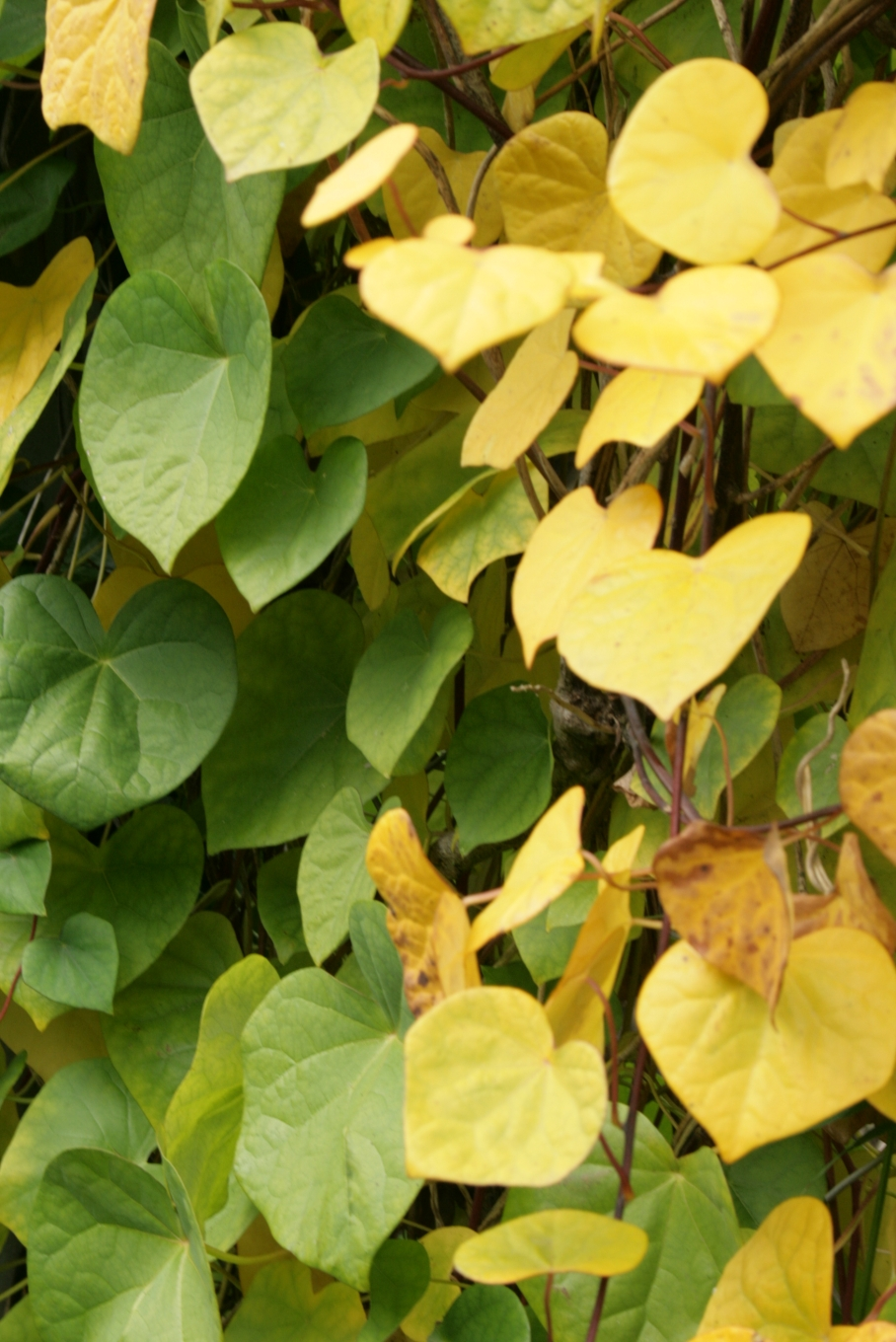
Menispermum dauricum foliage

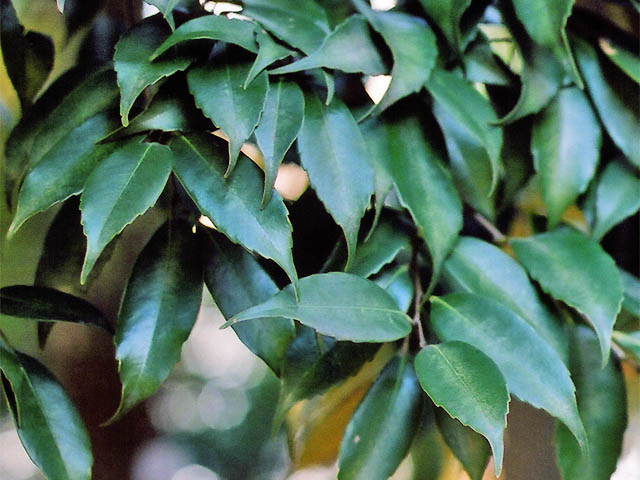
Castanopsis

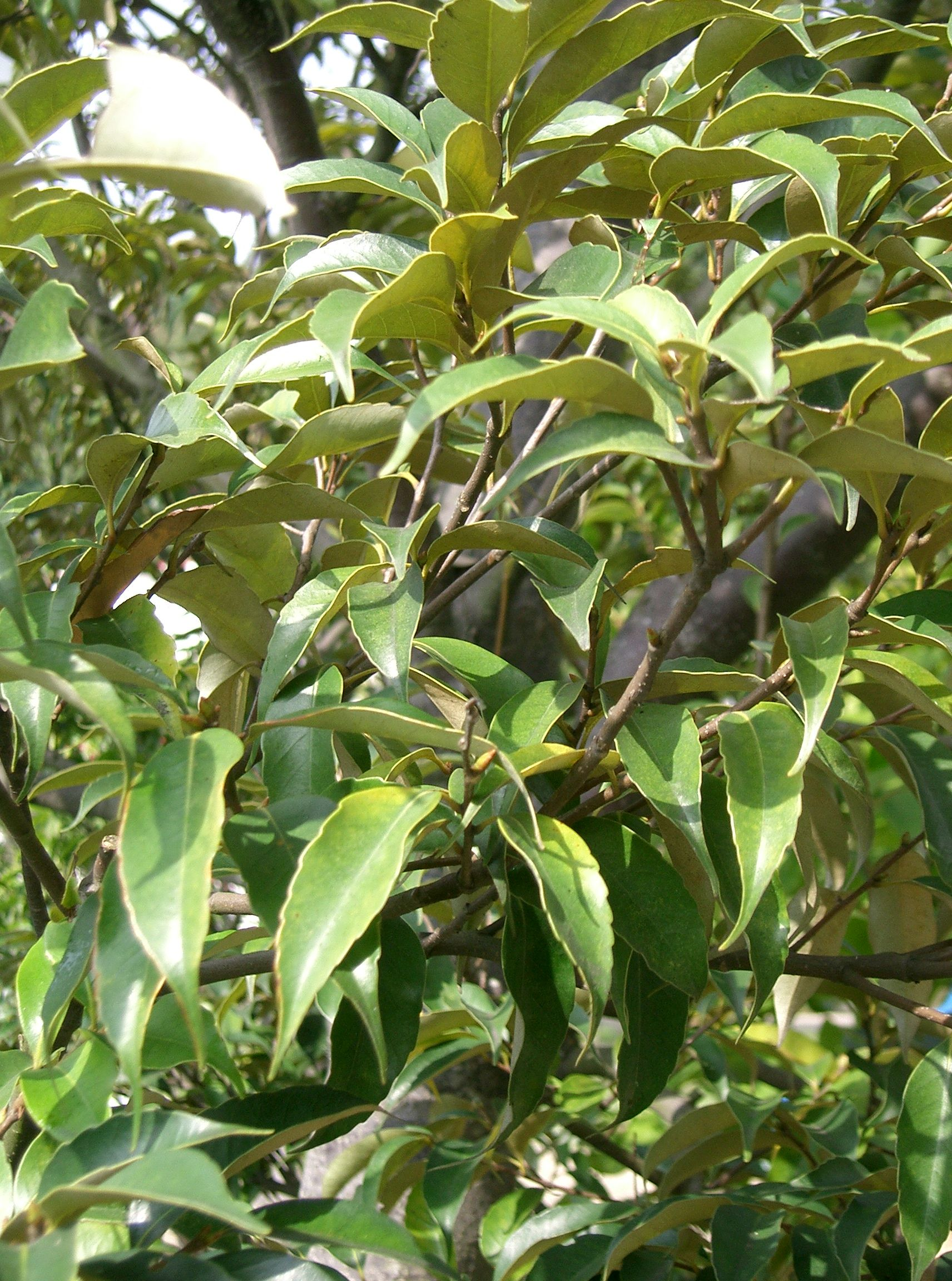
Castanopsis

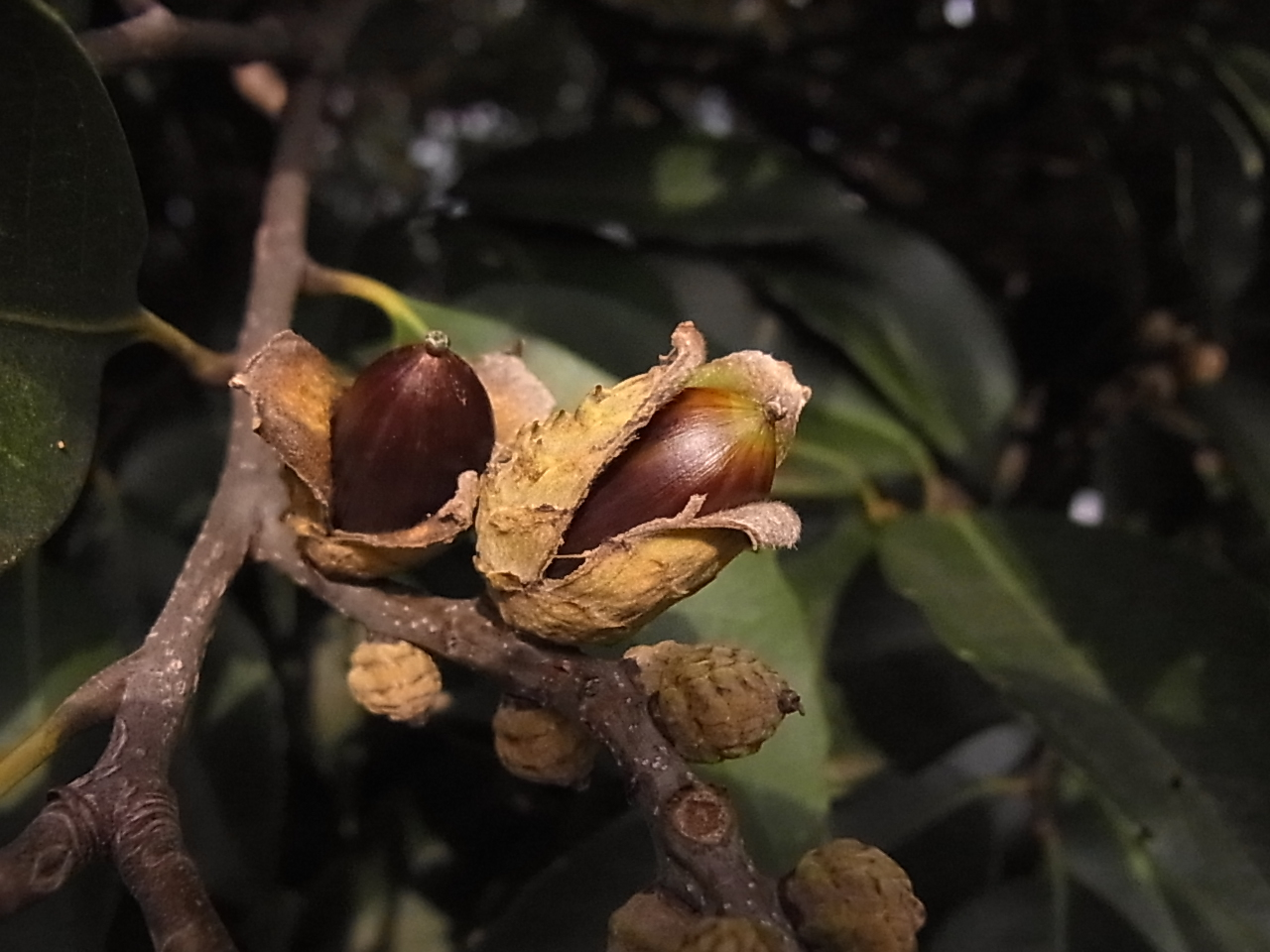
Castanopsis acorns.

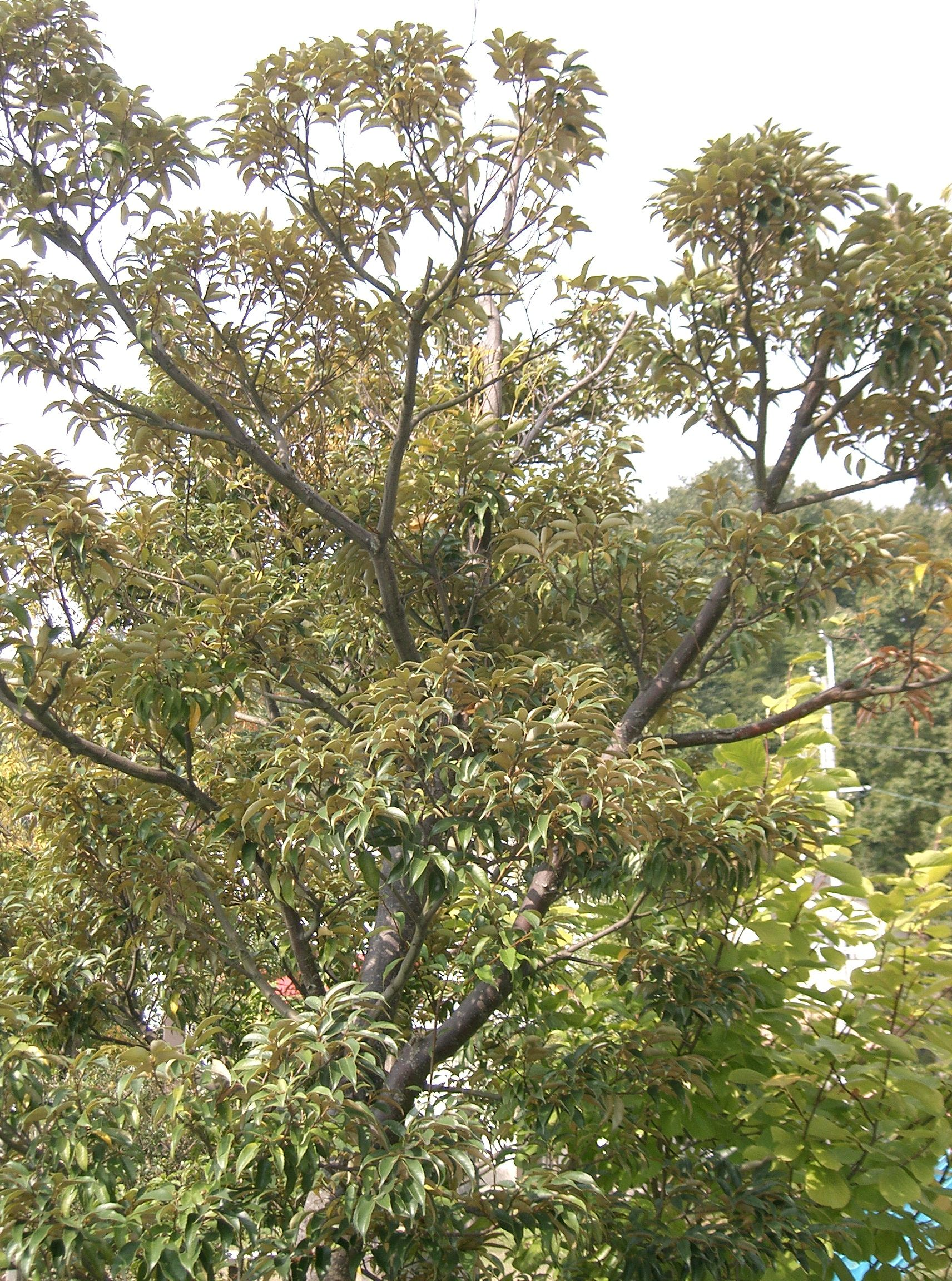
Castanopsis

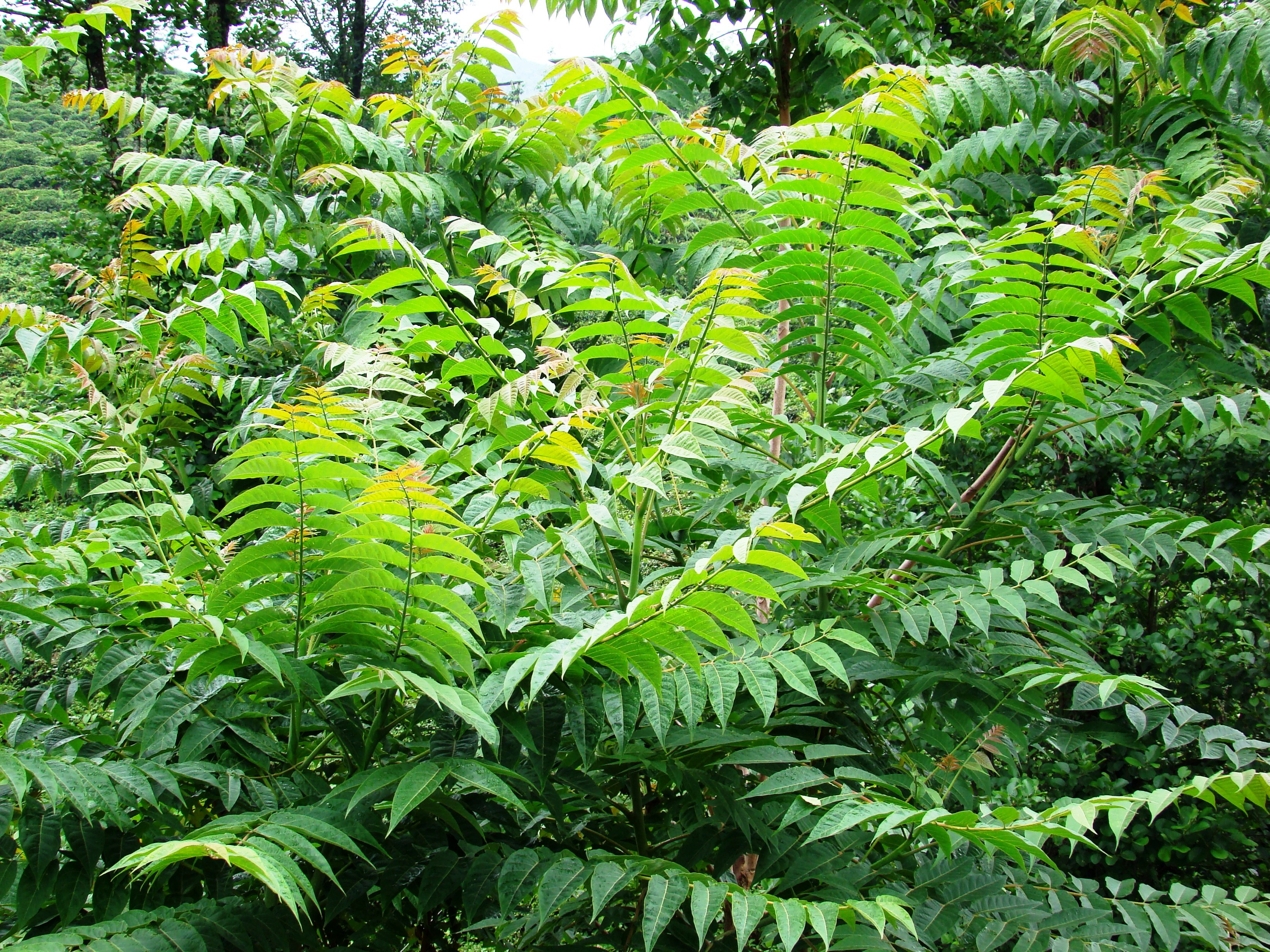
Ailanthus

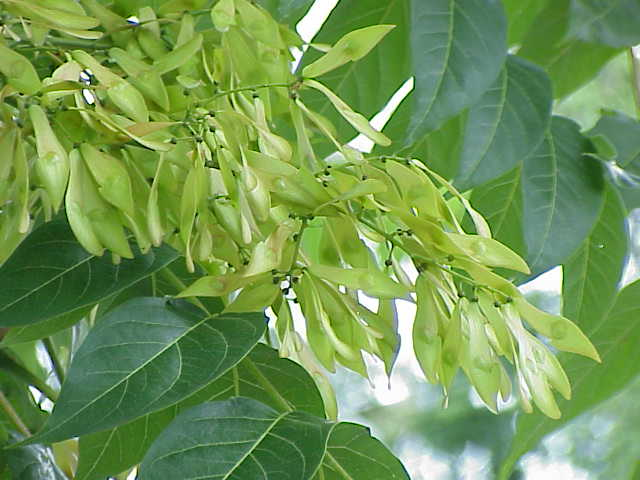
Ailanthus seeds

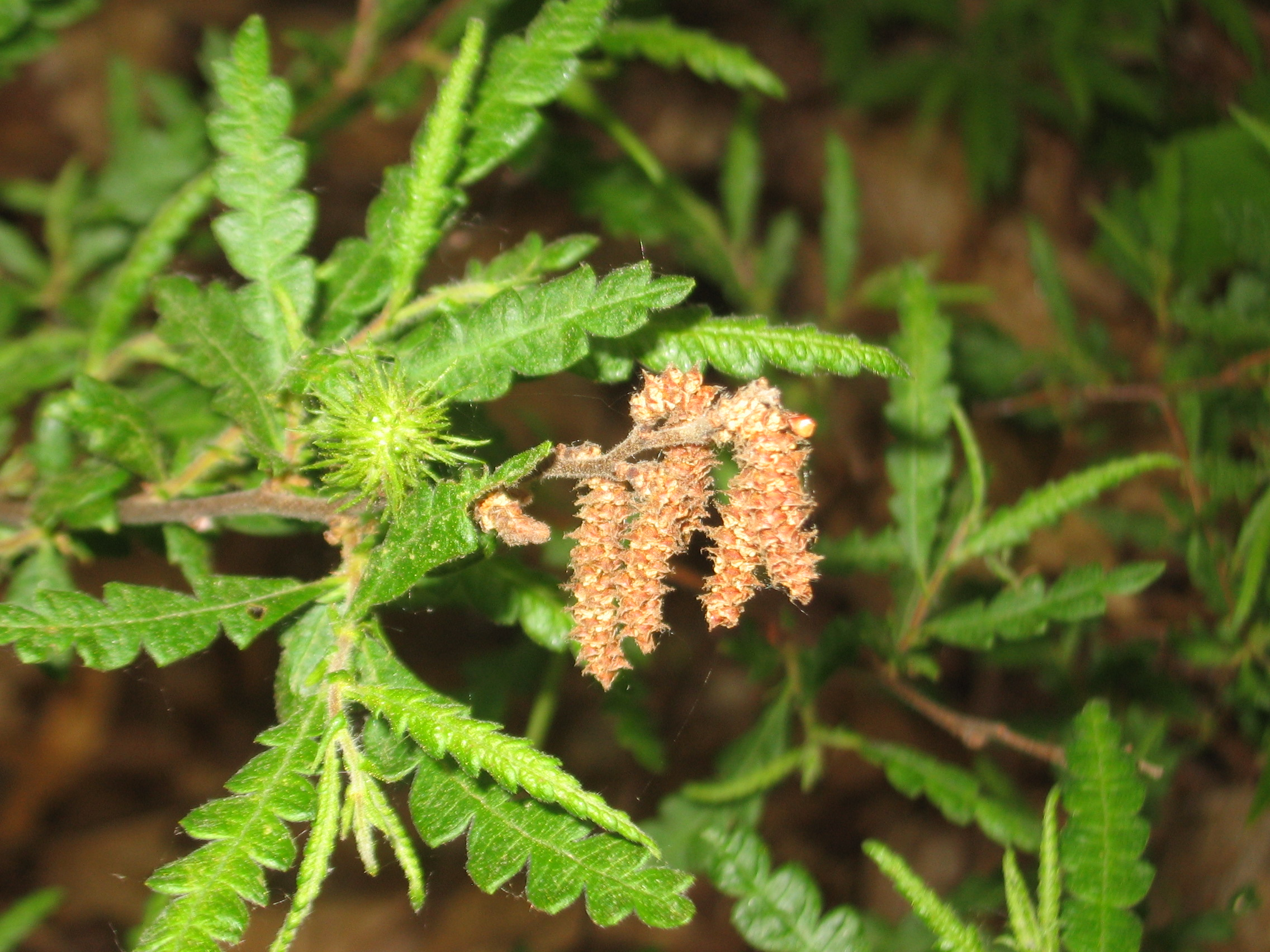
Comptonia

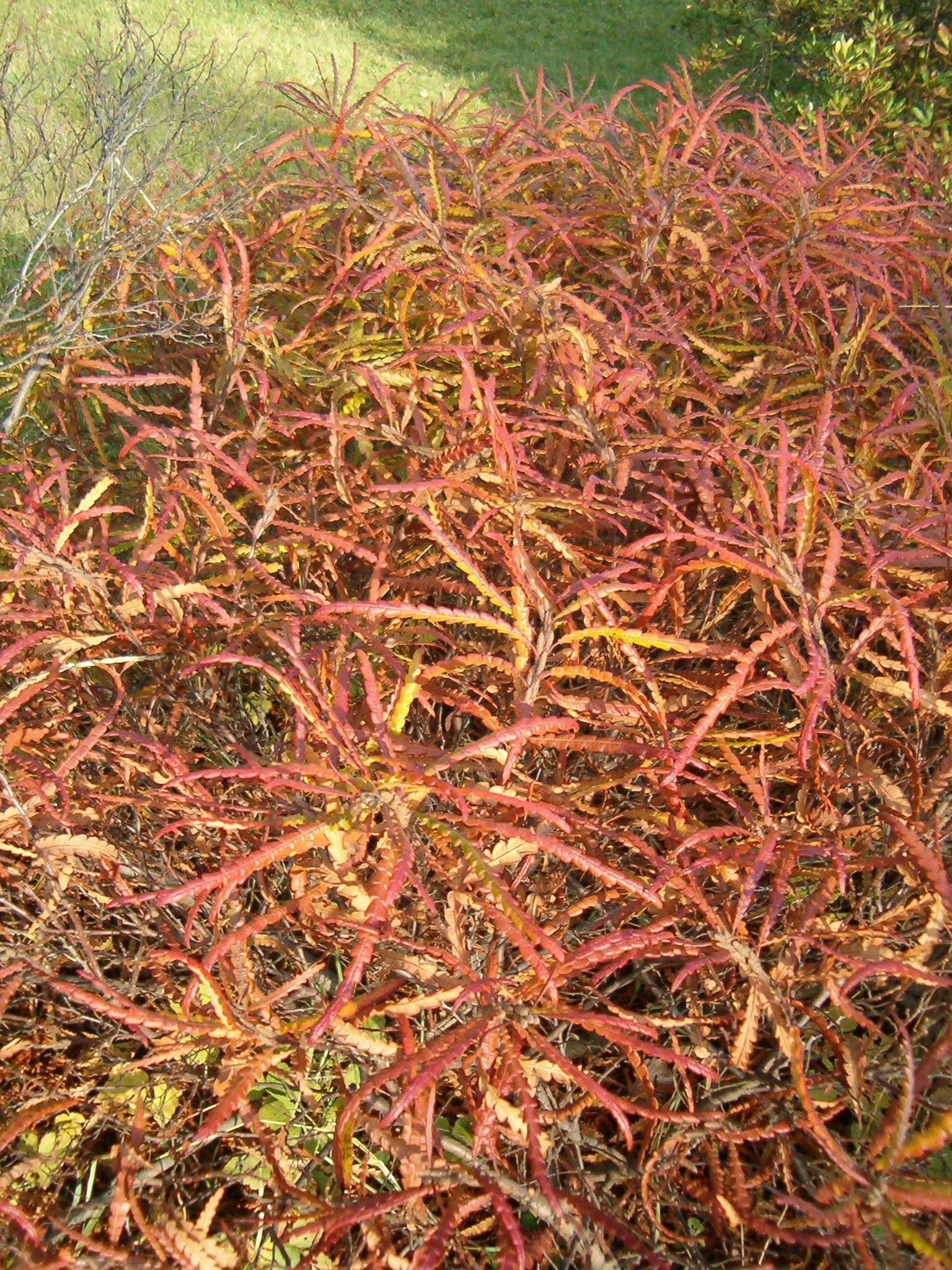
Comptonia

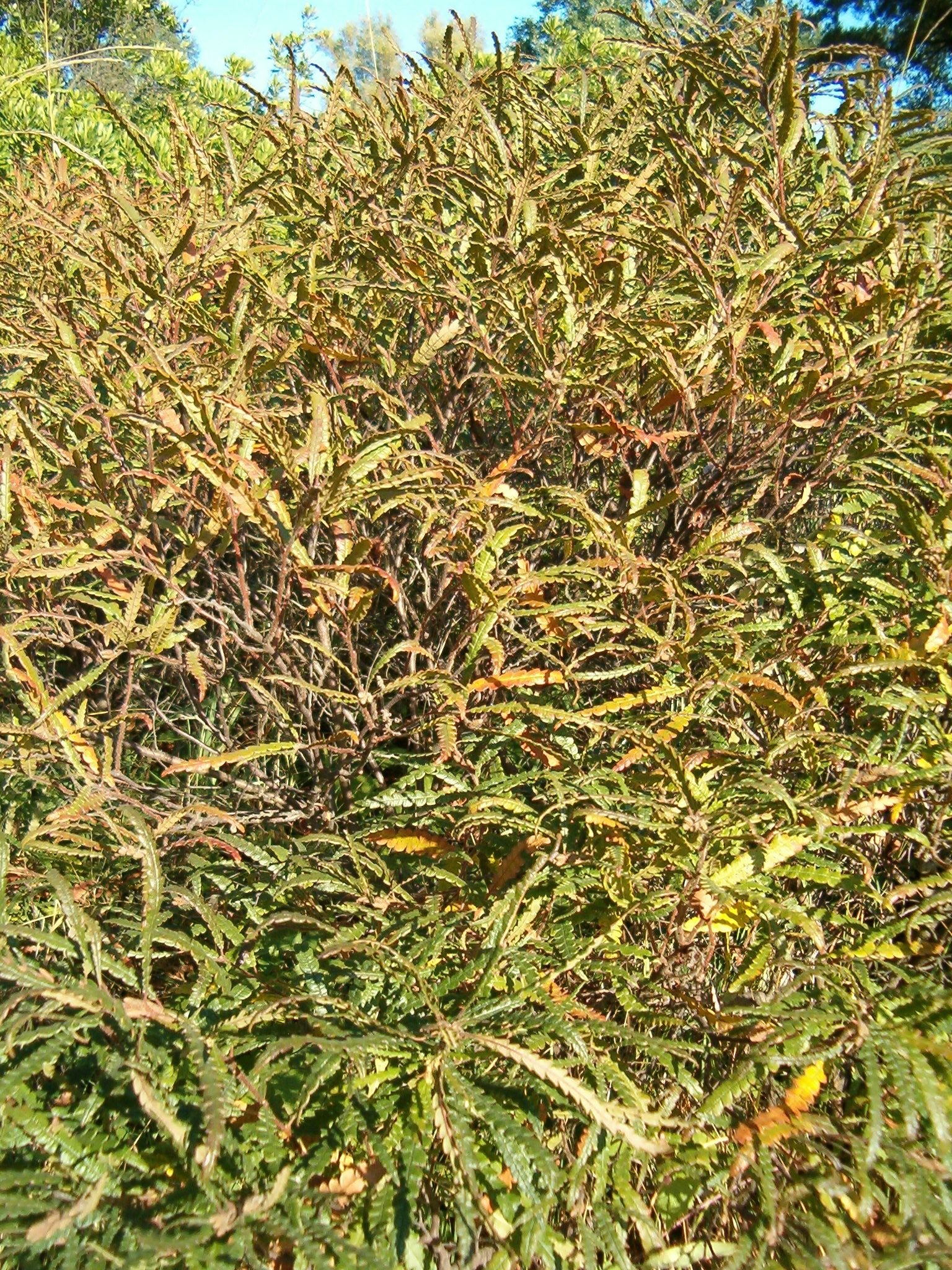
Comptonia

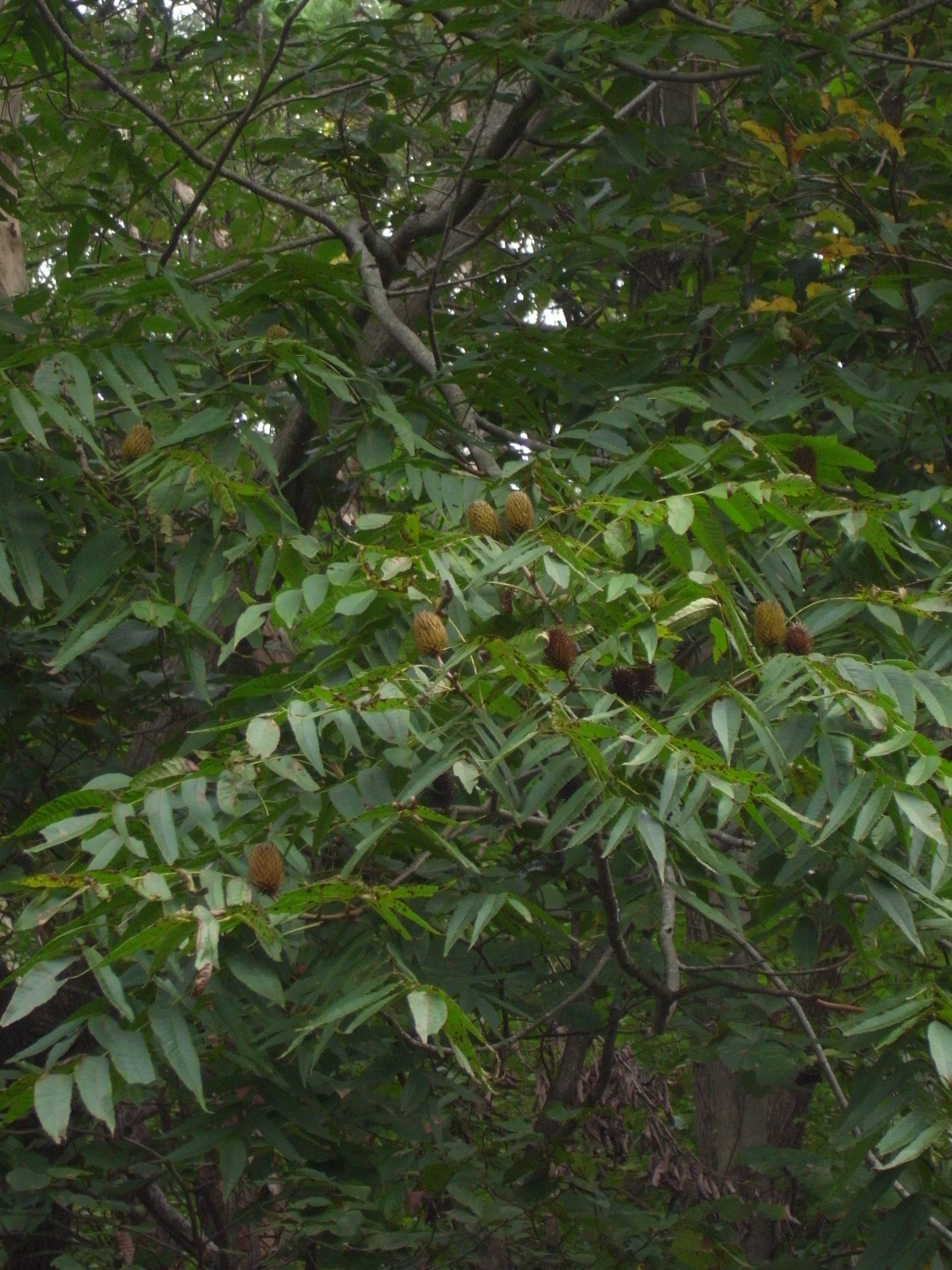
Platycarya

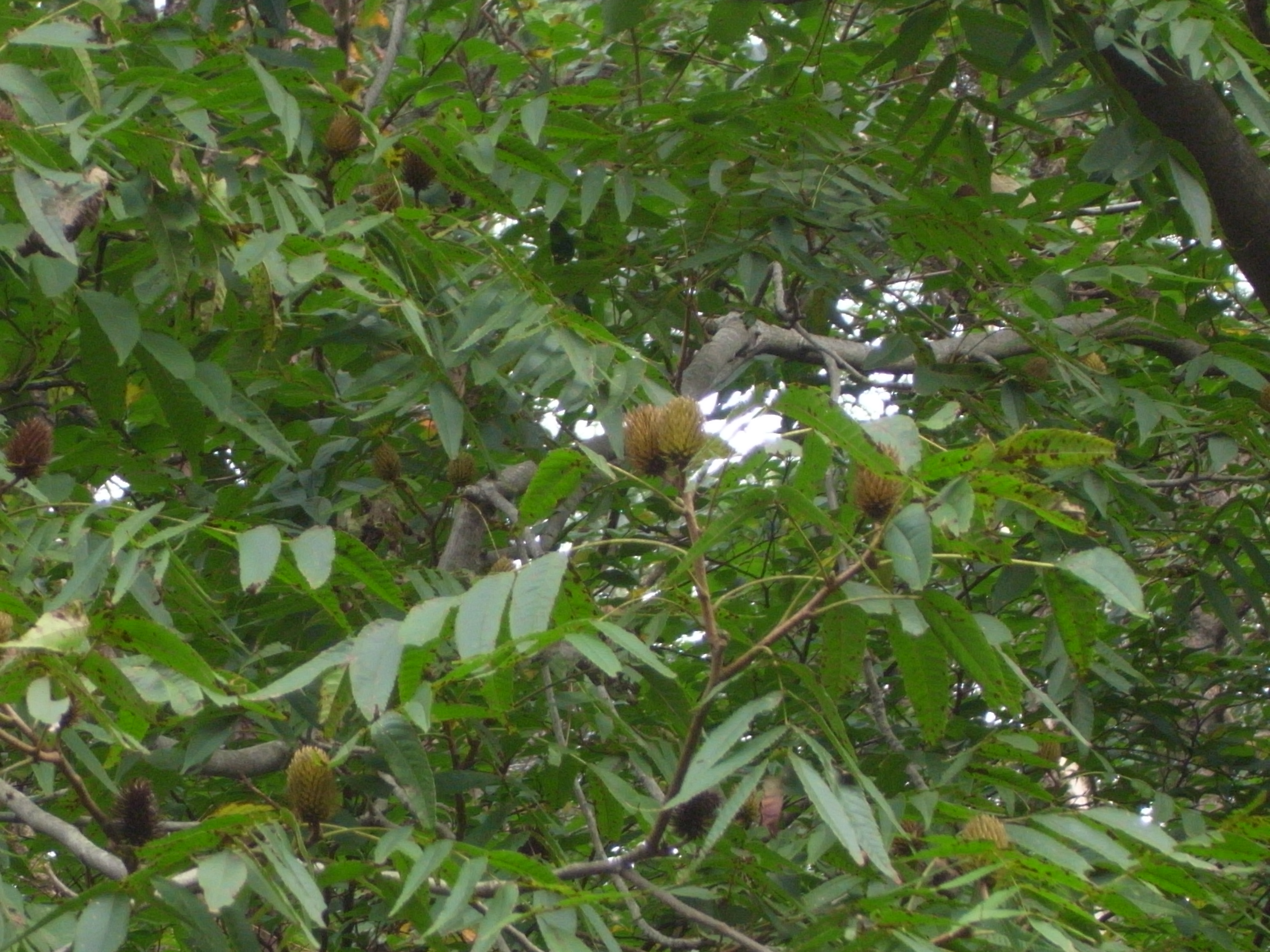
Platycarya

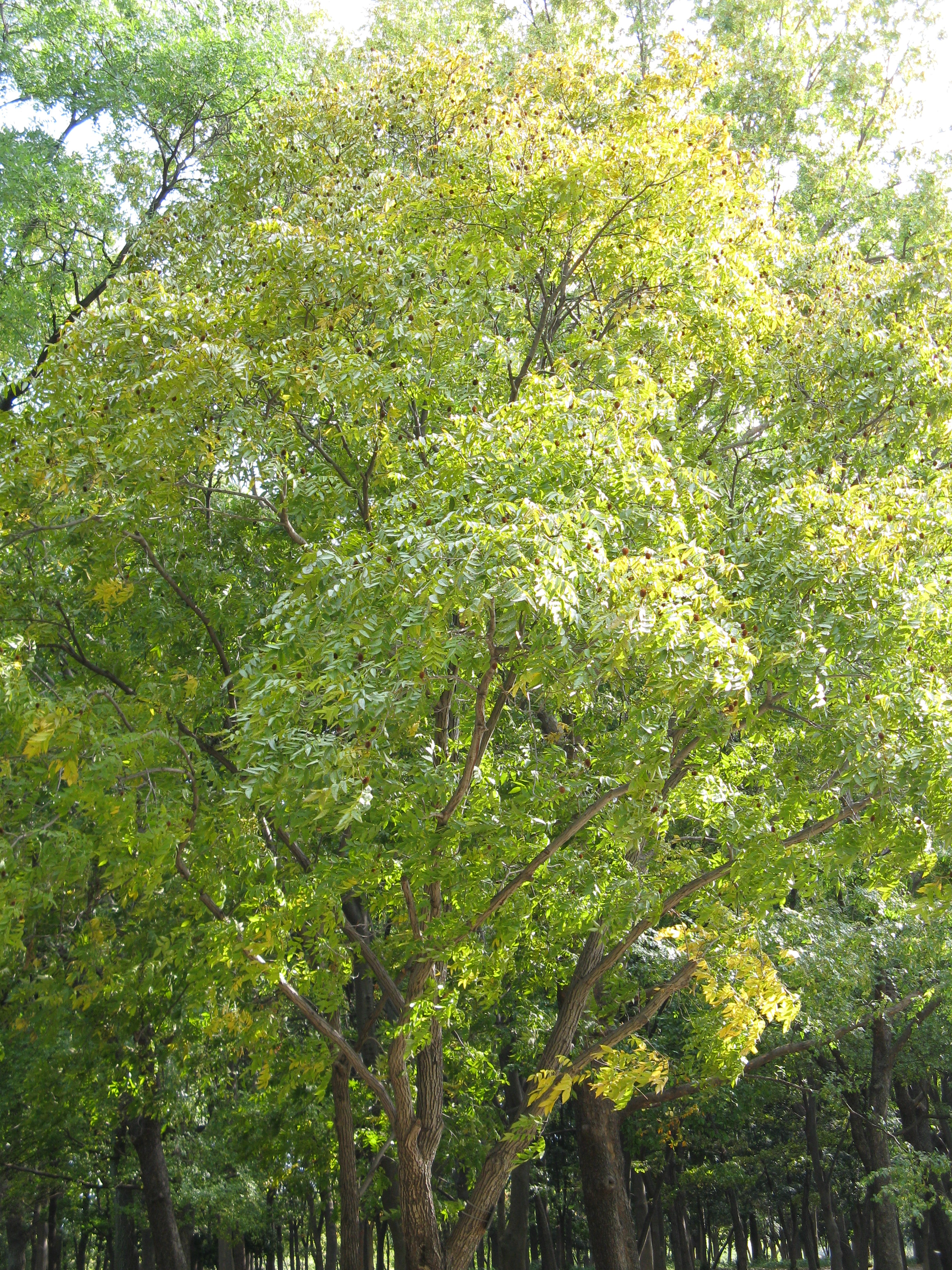
Platycarya

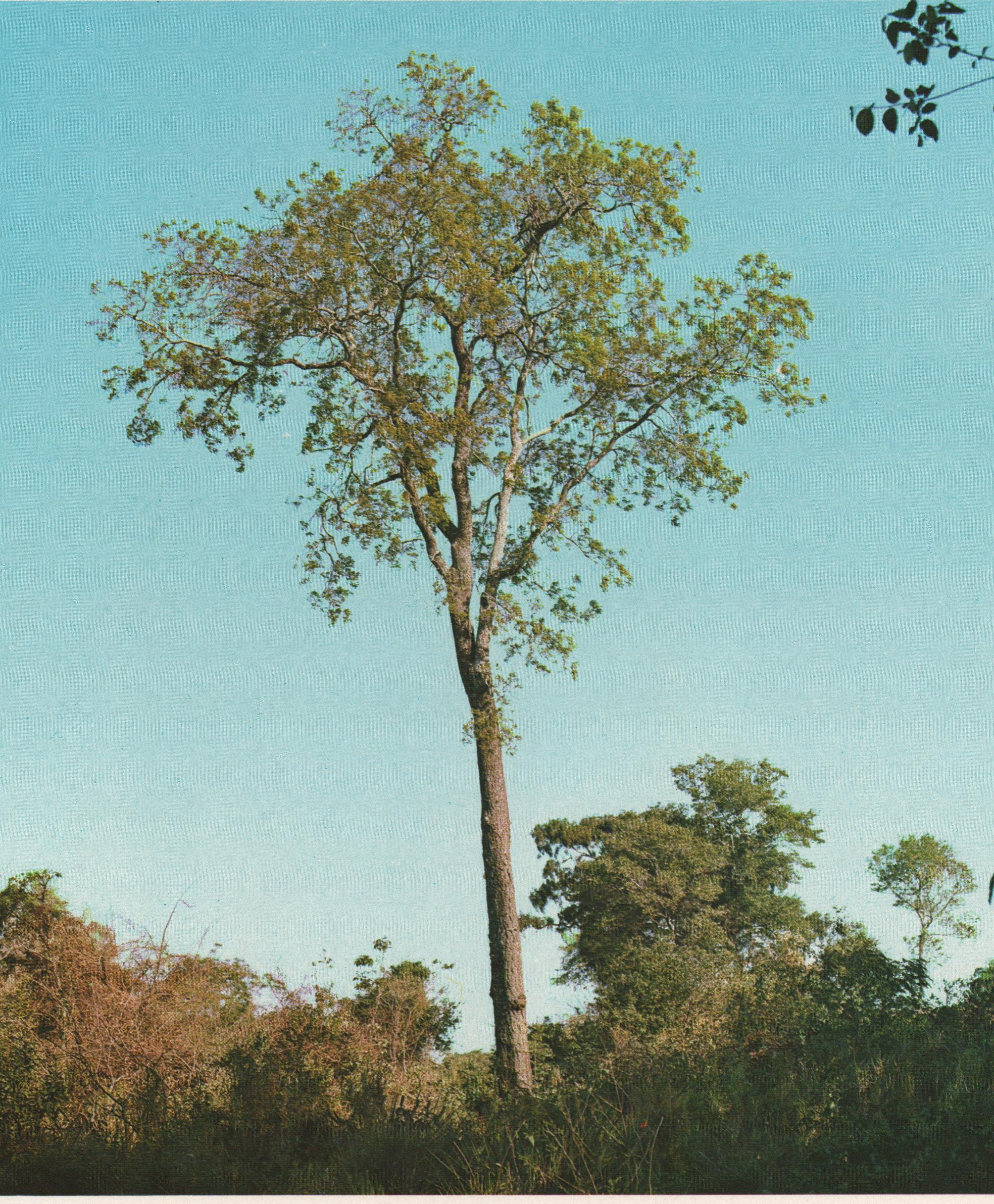
Astronium

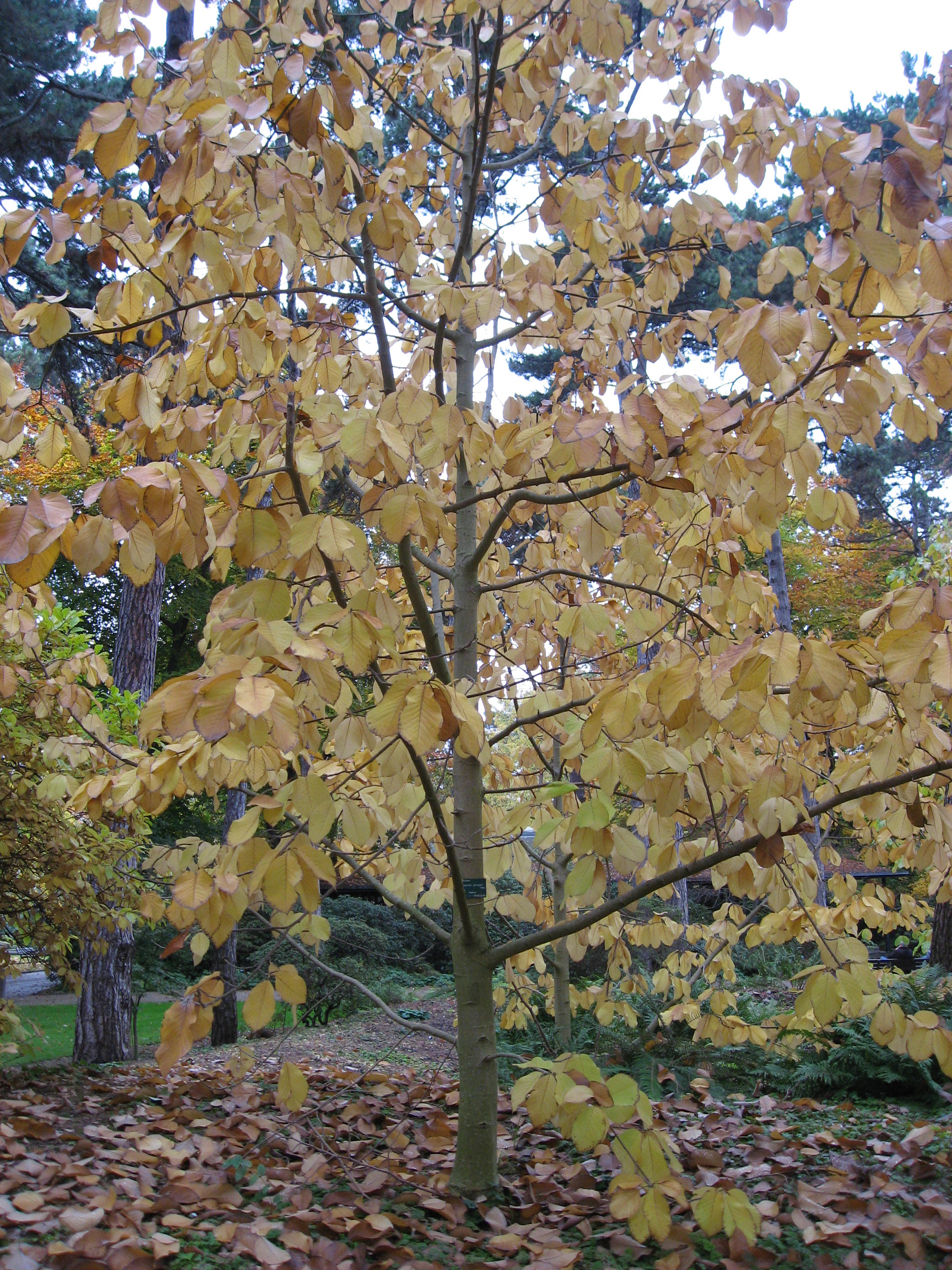
Magnolia sprengeri

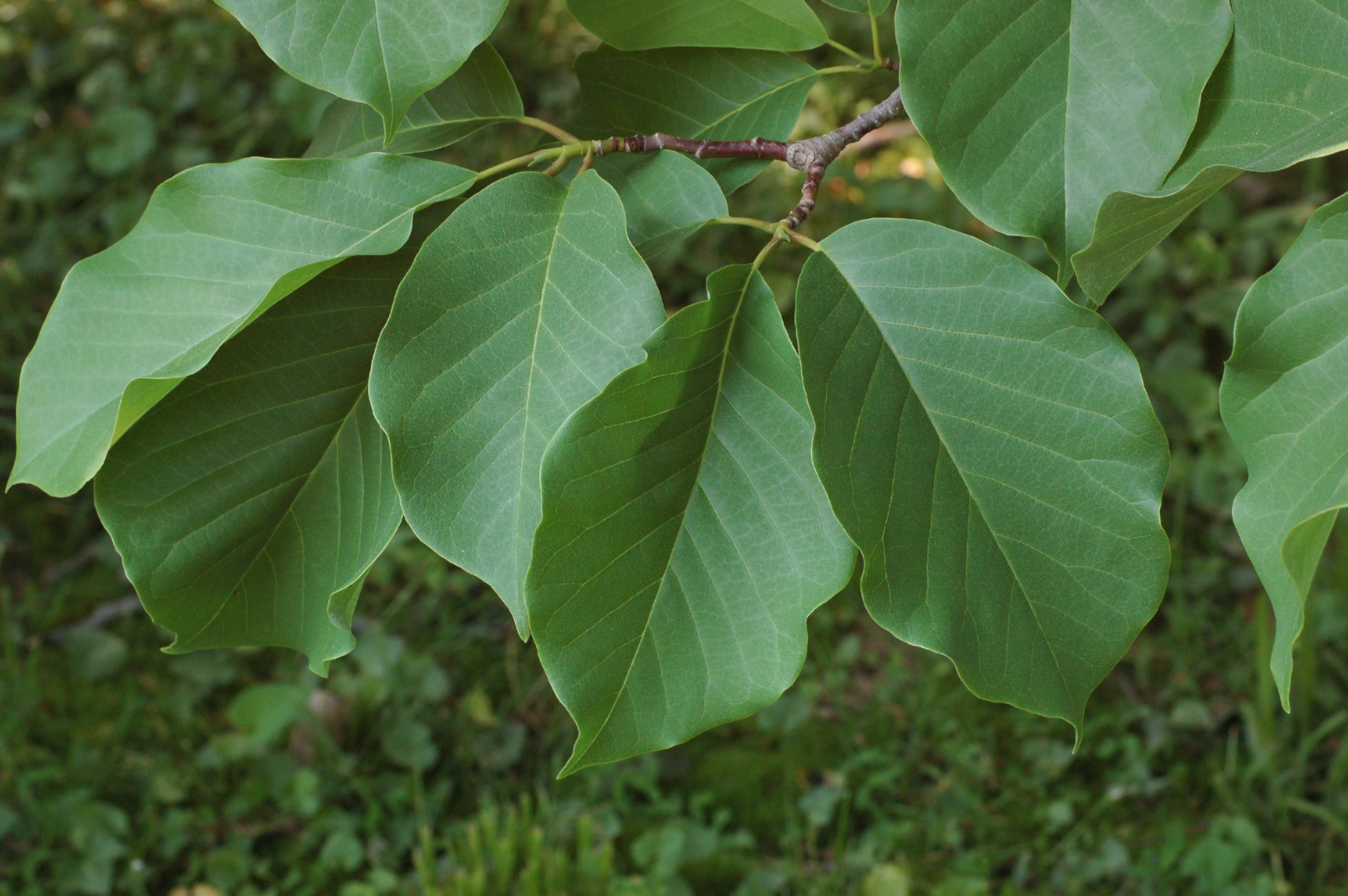
Magnolia sprengeri
