= Osman Güldemir =

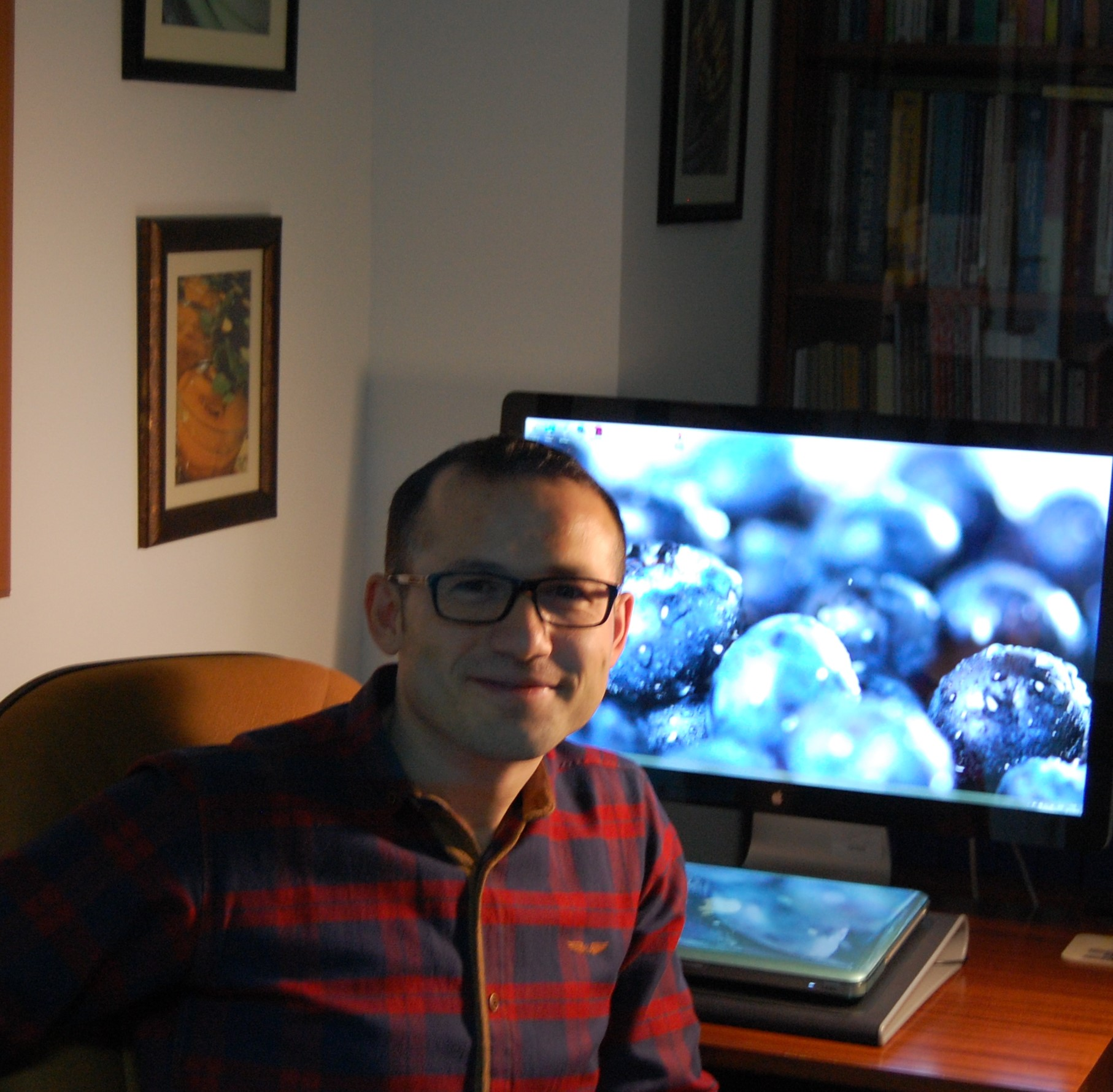
- Born: Gerede, Bolu Turkey
- Occupation(s): Writes, instructs and lectures about Turkish cuisine.

Osman Güldemir is a Turkish writer and teacher of Turkish cuisine, he is and has been a tutor at food culture classes at different colleges and universities in Turkey. In November 2015 his book about the food culture of the Ottoman Empire 'Bir Osmanlı Yemek Yazması-Kitabüt Tabbahin' was published.

== Gallery ==
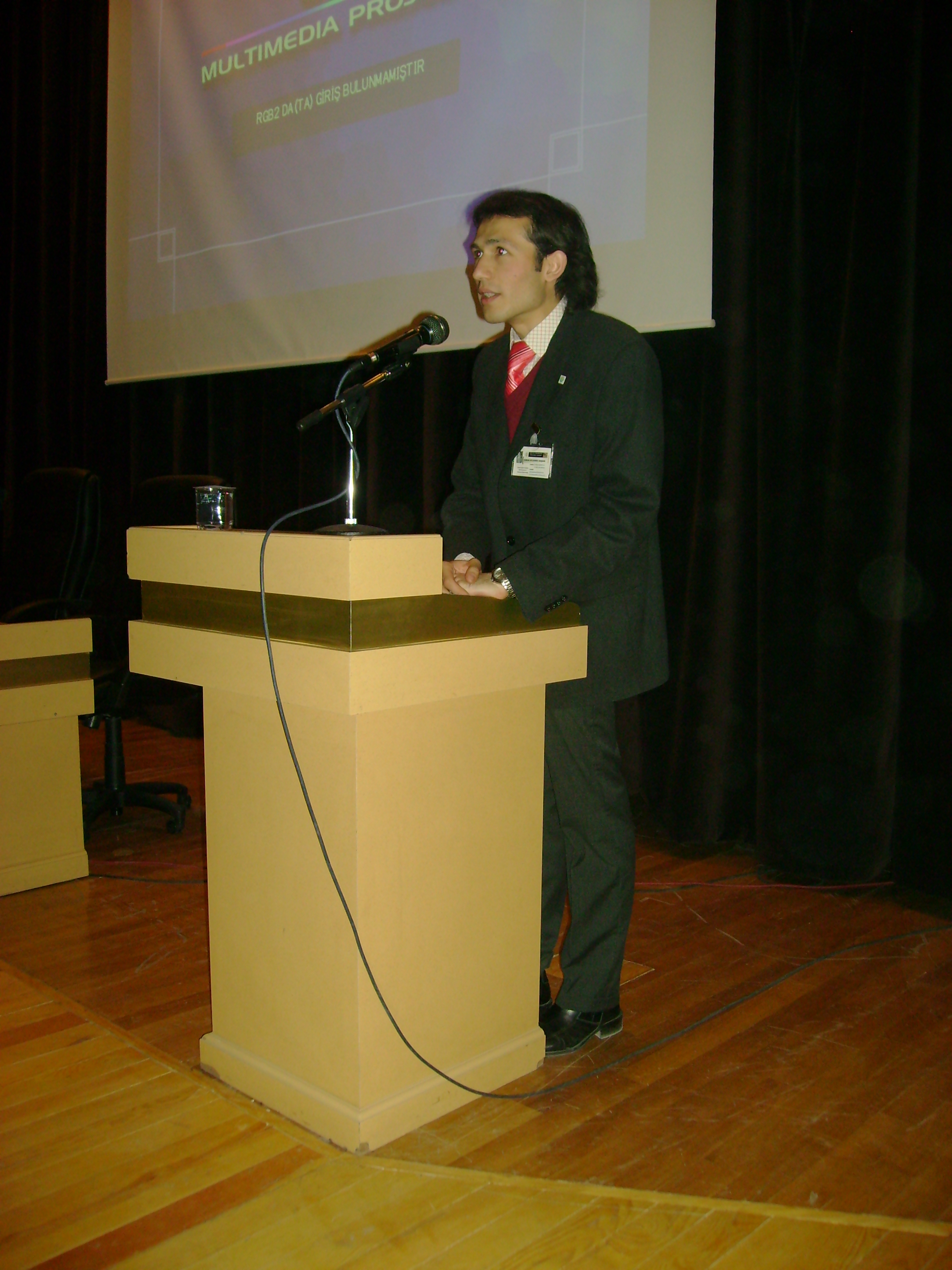
Osman Güldemir lecturing on December 17, 2006.

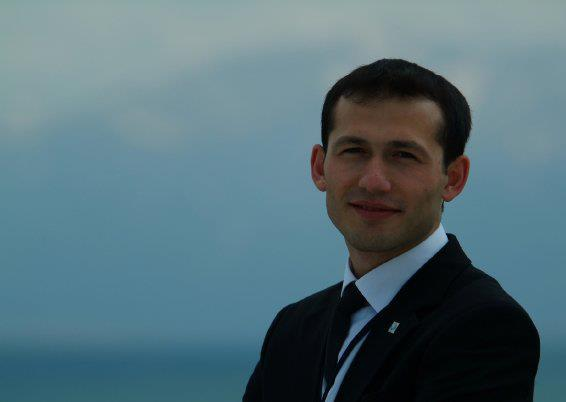
Osman Güldemir in Van in May 2012.

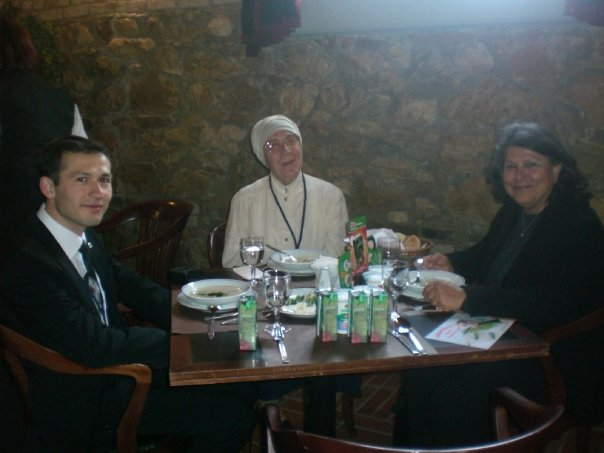
Osman Güldemir Together with his academic colleagues Şükran Öktem at right and Nevin Halıcı in the middle at Anadolu University on December 19, 2014.

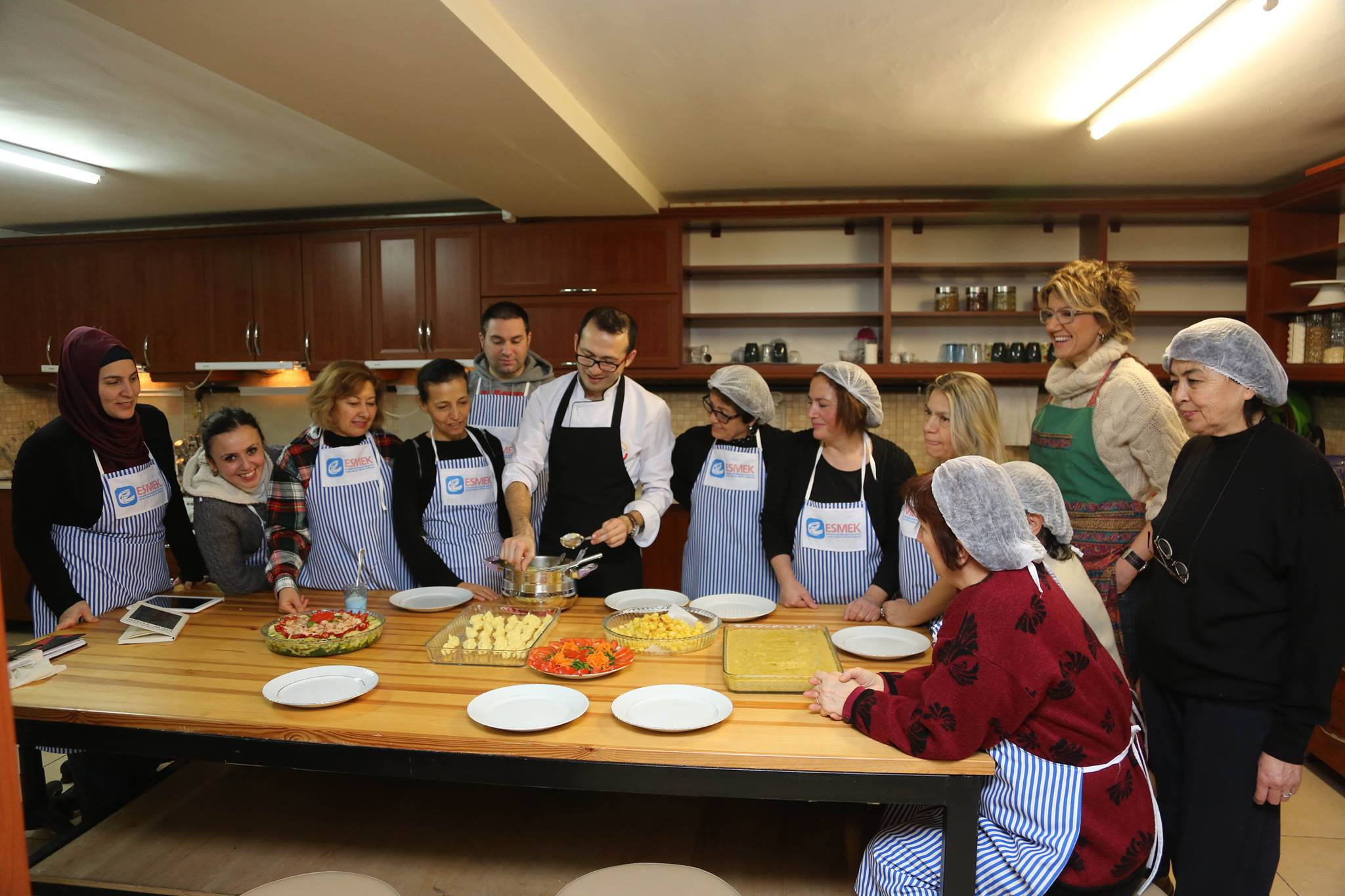
Osman Güldemir gives practical lessons at ESMEK on January 12, 2015.

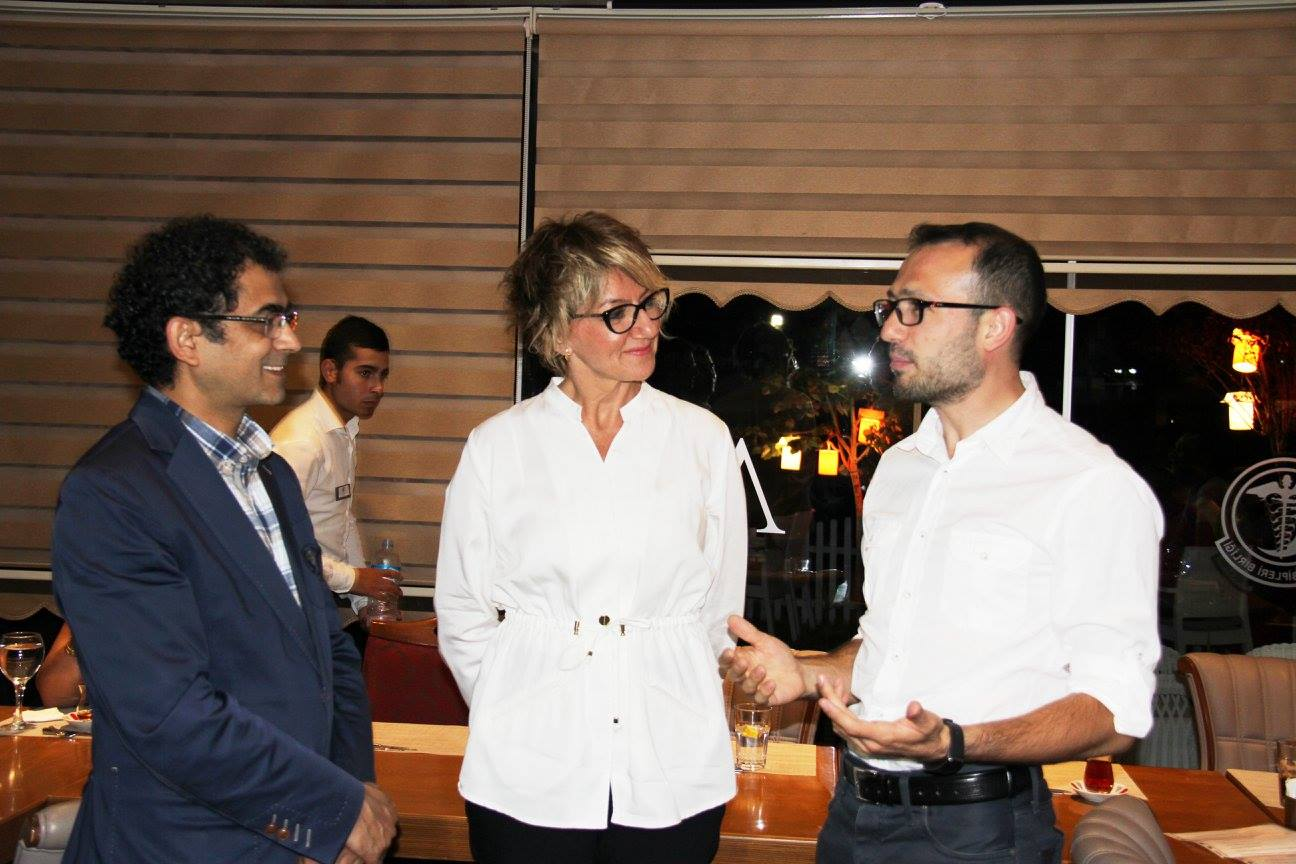
Osman Güldemir together with his academic colleagues Oğuzhan Özen and Didem Aydinmakina on July 6, 2015.

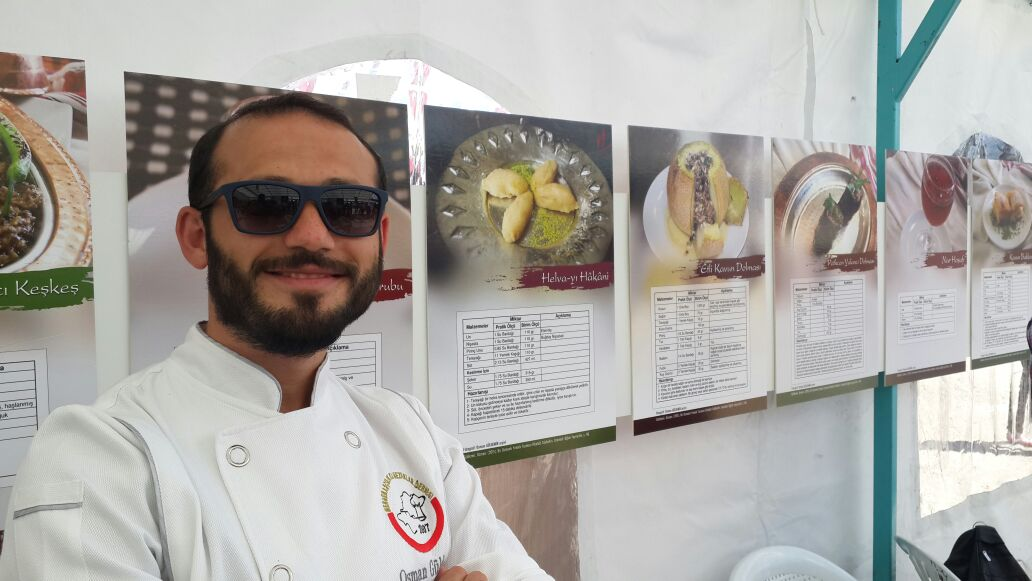
Osman GÜLDEMİR Mengen, Ottoman Dishes Exhibition in Bolu on October 15, 2016.

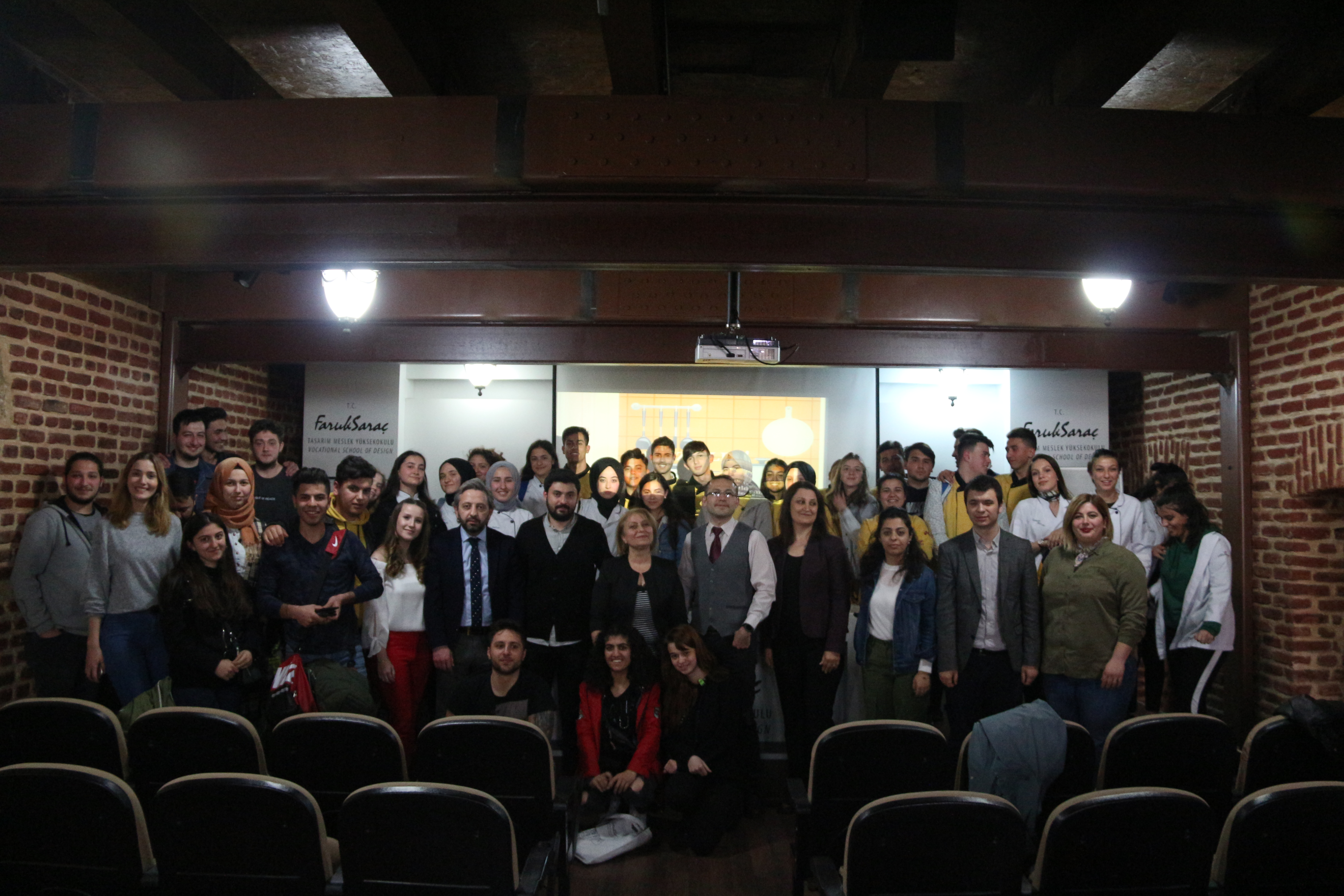
Osman Güldemir with students at Bursa Faruk Saraç Vocational School on April 16, 2019.

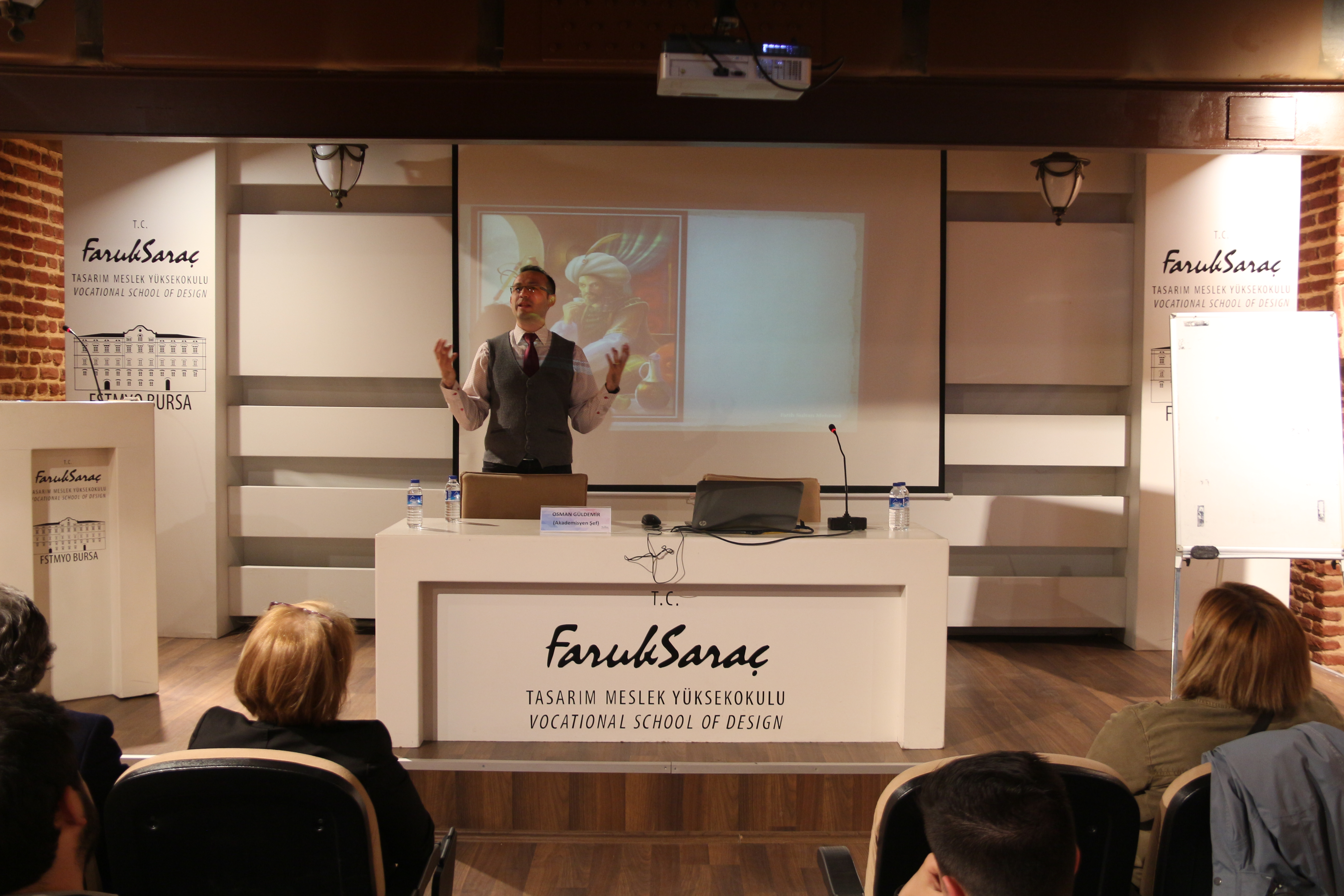
Osman Güldemir lecturing at Bursa Faruk Saraç Vocational School on April 16, 2019.

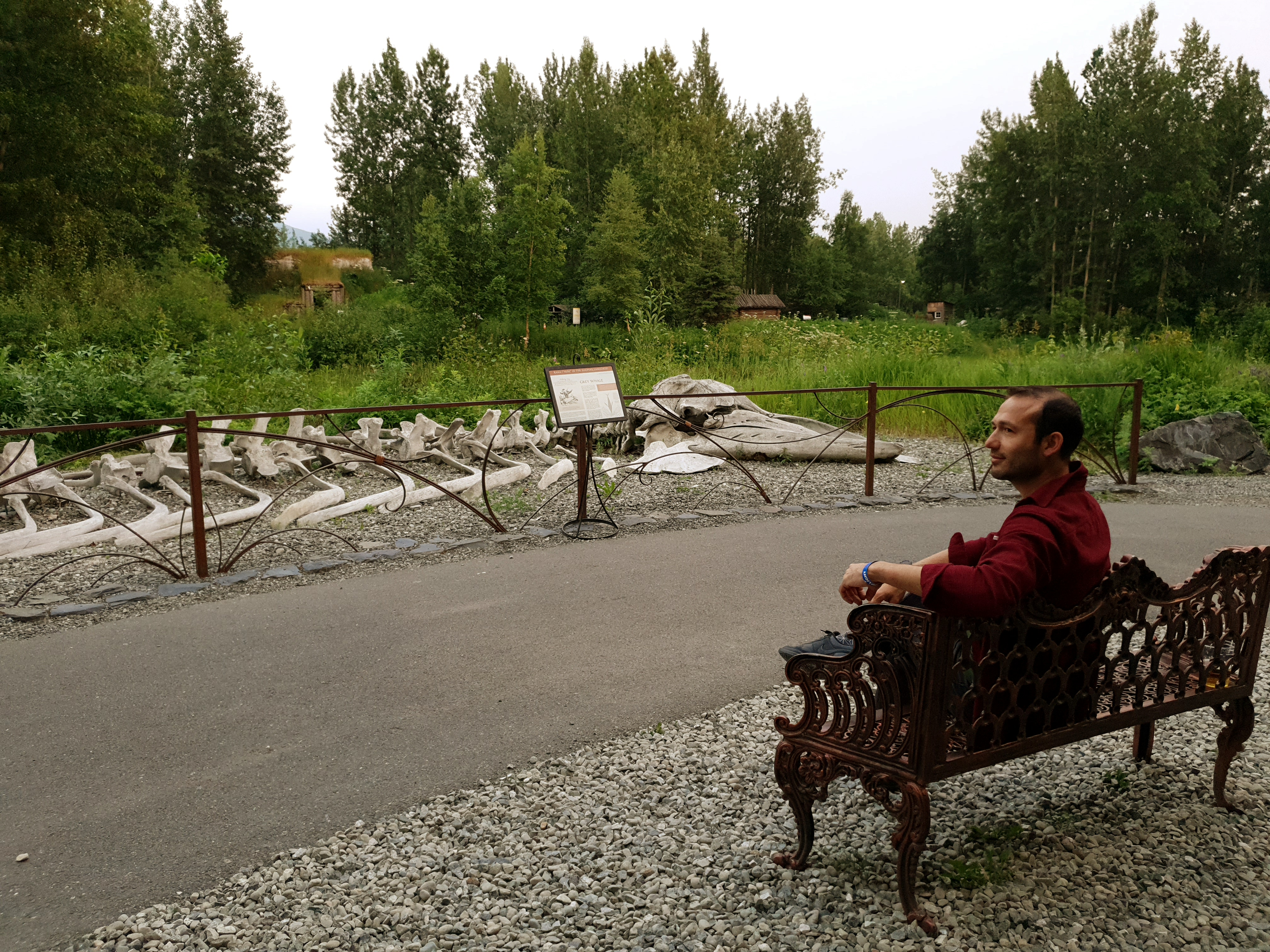
Osman Güldemir in Alaska at Anchorage Native Heritage Museum on June 27, 2019.

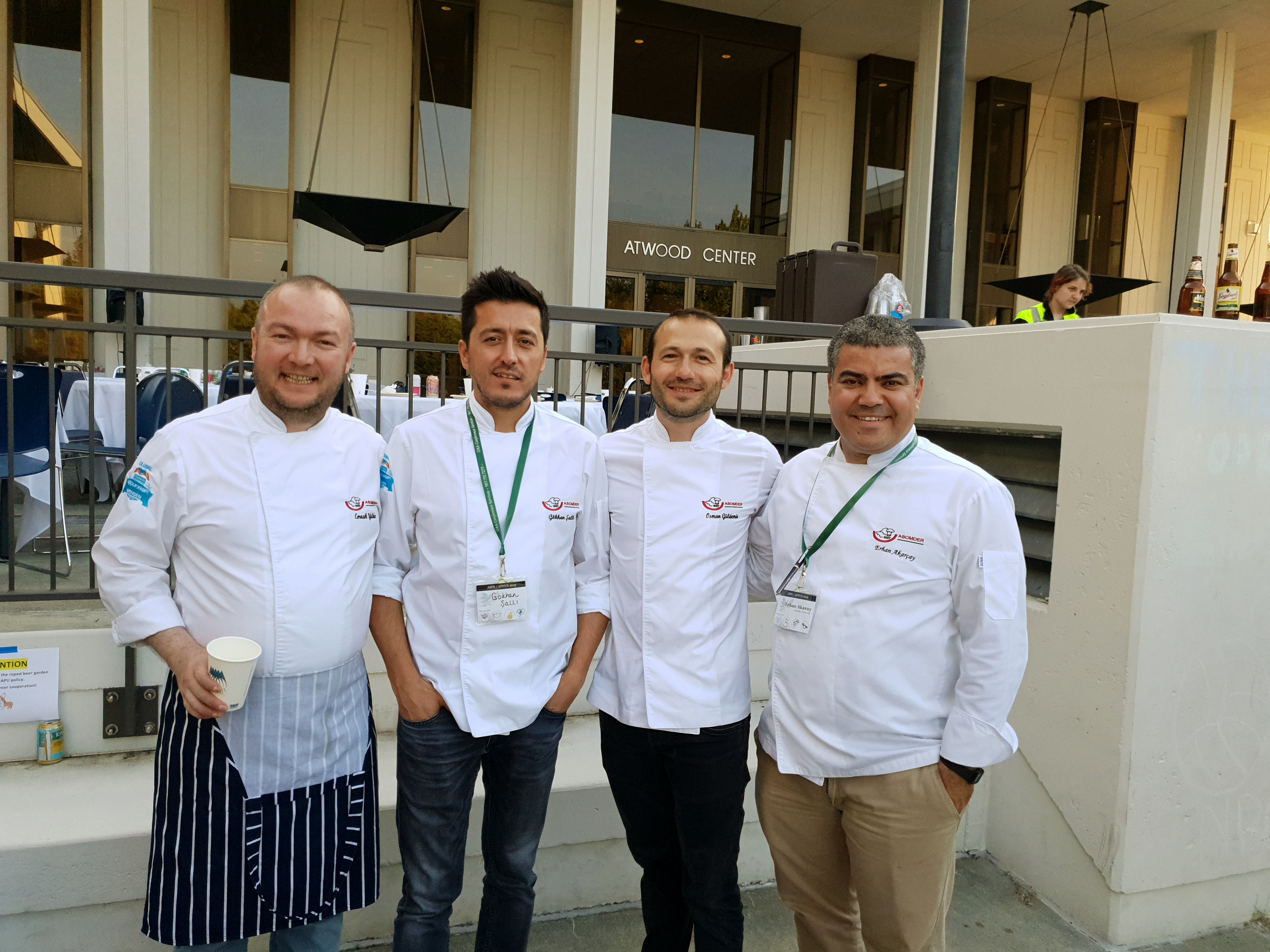
Emrah Yıldız, Gökhan Şallı, Osman Güldemir and Erhan Akarçay are organizing a Turkish Picnic at Anchorage Atwood Center in Alaska on June 28, 2019.

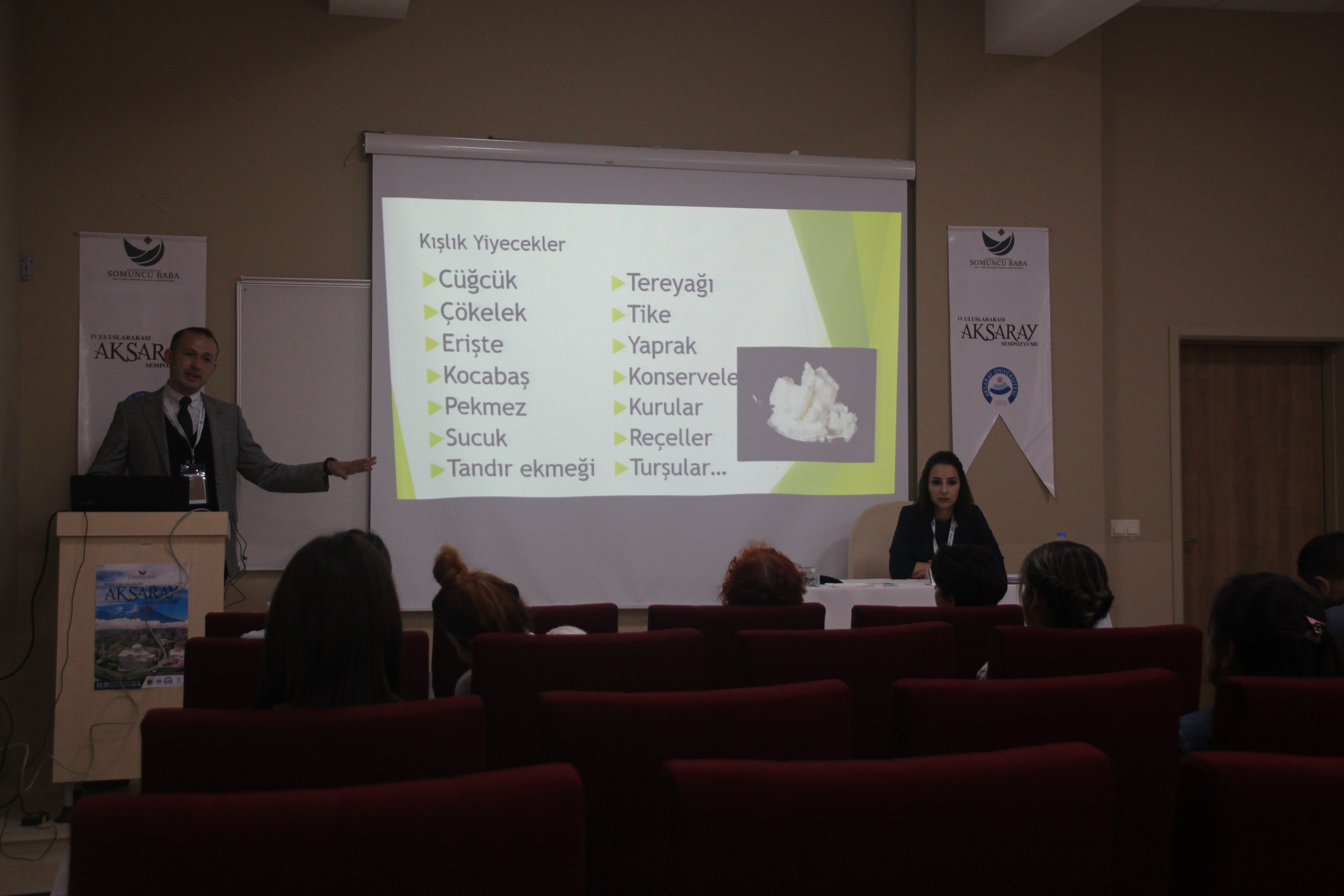
Osman Güldemir giving lectures at Aksaray symposium on October 27, 2019.
