= 2013 Turkish Parliament Speaker election =

2013 Turkish Parliament Speaker elections
← 2011	2 July 2013	Jun–Jul 2015 →

548 of 550 Members of Parliament voting in the Grand National Assembly 367 votes needed to win in the first two rounds 276 votes needed to win in the third round
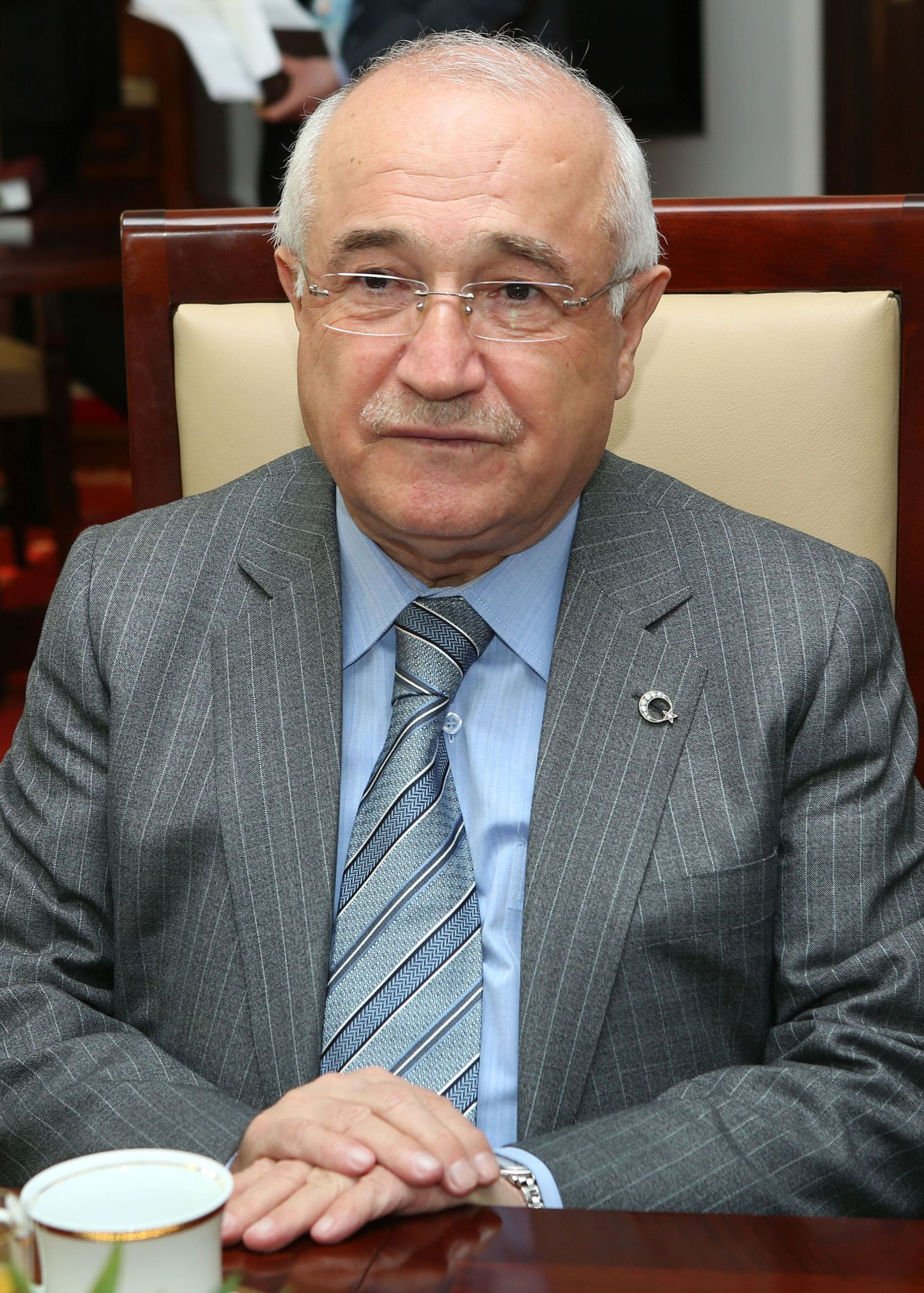

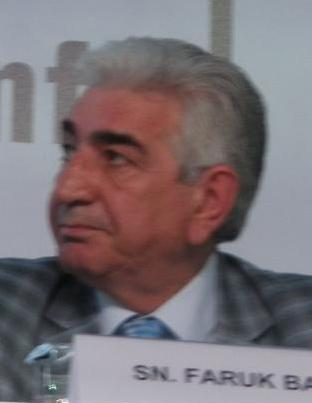
Nominee	Cemil Çiçek	Osman Korutürk	Faruk Bal
Party	AK Party	CHP	MHP
Constituency	Ankara (II)	İstanbul (I)	Konya
Round 1	292 (64.7%)	108 (23.9%)	51 (11.3%)
Round 2	294 (65.2%)	110 (24.4%)	47 (10.4%)
Round 3	299 (65.7%)	109 (24.0%)	47 (10.3%)
Speaker before election
Cemil Çiçek
AK Party
Elected Speaker
Cemil Çiçek
AK Party

The mid-term Turkish Parliament Speaker elections of 2013 were held on 2 July 2013 in order to elect the Speaker of the Grand National Assembly. The election took place in three rounds, resulting in the incumbent Speaker Cemil Çiçek being re-elected to continue serving until the end of the 24th Parliament. The election took place half-way through the term of the 24th Parliament, which lasted from June 2011 to June 2015.

Three candidates contested the election, with the Justice and Development Party (AKP) re-nominating Çiçek. The Republican People's Party (CHP) nominated Osman Korutürk while the Nationalist Movement Party (MHP) nominated Faruk Bal. The Peace and Democracy Party (BDP) did not put forward a candidate. Çiçek was elected in the third round, winning 299 votes to Korutürk's and Bal's.

== Election process ==
The Speaker is elected by secret ballot through a maximum of four rounds held within Parliament, with a two-thirds majority of 367 votes to be elected outright in the first two rounds. If the election goes into a third round, the votes needed to win is lowered to a simple majority (276) votes. If the election goes into a fourth round, the top two candidates who won the most votes in the third round contest a run-off, with the candidate winning the highest number of votes being elected.

== Candidates ==
=== Potential candidates ===
Before the candidates were announced, it was speculated that Burhan Kuzu could be selected as the AKP's nominee. When the AKP eventually settled for Çiçek, Kuzu released a statement claiming that he was not resentful but very hurt by the decision.

=== Declared candidates ===
- Cemil Çiçek, incumbent Speaker of the Grand National Assembly and AKP Member of Parliament for Ankara's second electoral district
- Osman Korutürk, former Ambassador and CHP Member of Parliament for İstanbul's first electoral district
- Faruk Bal, former Minister of State and MHP Member of Parliament for Konya
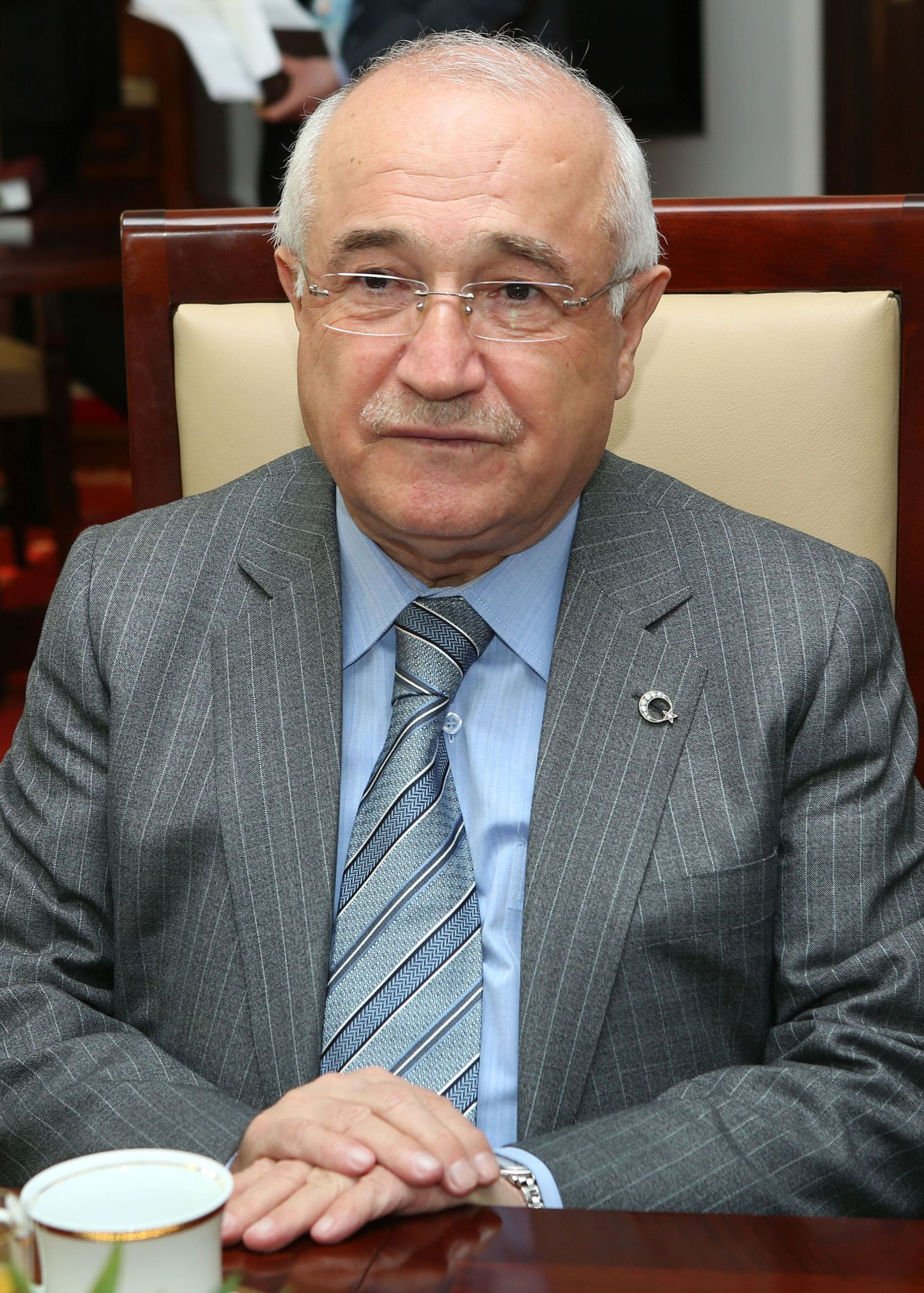
Cemil Çiçek, incumbent Speaker of the Grand National Assembly and AKP Member of Parliament for Ankara's second electoral district

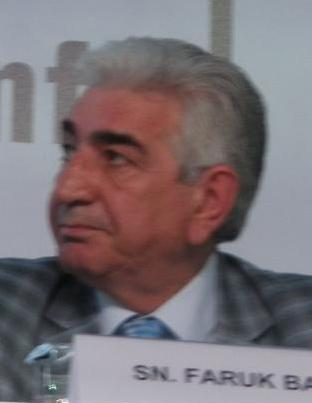
Faruk Bal, former Minister of State and MHP Member of Parliament for Konya

== Results ==
Party	Candidate	Party MPs	July 2, 2013		
Party	Candidate	Party MPs	Round 1 367 votes to win	Round 2 367 votes to win	Round 3 276 votes to win
AKP	Cemil Çiçek	327	292	294	✓ 299
CHP	Osman Korutürk	134	108	110	109
MHP	Faruk Bal	52	51	47	47
Invalid			10	8	7
Blank			21	24	15
Turnout			482	483	477
Result			Inconclusive	Inconclusive	Çiçek elected
Source: Sabah

== See also ==
- Deputy Speaker of the Grand National Assembly
