= Ankara (1st electoral district) =

Electoral district for the Grand National Assembly of Turkey

Coordinates: 39°53′26″N 32°51′42″E

Ankara (I)
- electoral district for the Grand National Assembly of Turkey
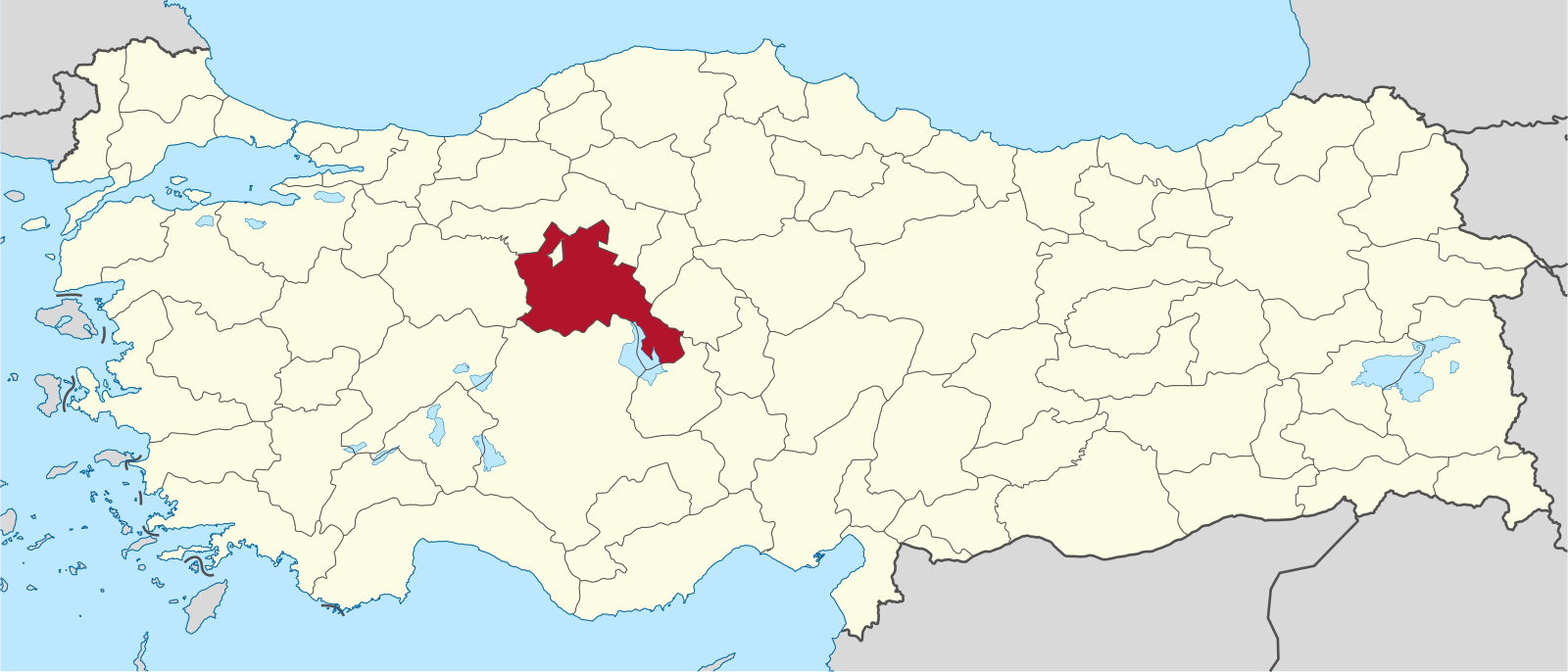
- Ankara (I) shown within Turkey
- Province: Ankara
- Electorate: 1,401,842

Current electoral district
- Created: 1923
- Seats: 13 Historical: 16 (2011) 15 (2002–2007)
- Parent district: Ankara
- Turnout at last election: 89.17%
- Representation
- CHP: 5 / 13
- AK Party: 4 / 13
- İYİ: 2 / 13
- MHP: 2 / 13
- HDP: 1 / 13

Ankara's first electoral district is one of three divisions of Ankara province for the purpose of elections to Grand National Assembly of Turkey. It elects sixteen members of parliament (deputies) to represent the district for a five-year term by the D'Hondt method, a party-list proportional representation system.

== Division ==
The first electoral district contains the following Ankara administrative districts (ilçe):

- Bala
- Çankaya
- Elmadağ
- Evren
- Gölbaşı
- Haymana
- Mamak
- Polatlı
- Şereflikoçhisar

== Members ==
Population reviews of each electoral district are conducted before each general election, which can lead to certain districts being granted a smaller or greater number of parliamentary seats. Ankara's first district elected 15 MPs in 2002 and 2007. In 2011, this number increased to 16. Since the number of electoral districts in Ankara increased to 3 in 2018, currently this district elects 13 MPs.

MPs for Ankara (I), onward 2018
Election	2018 (27th parliament)	2023 (28th parliament)
MP	Yıldırım Tuğrul Türkeş; AK Party	
MP	Fatih Şahin; AK Party	Jülide Şarıeroğlu; AK Party
MP	Yalçın Akdoğan; AK Party	Murat Alparslan; AK Party
MP	Ali İhsan Arslan; AK Party	Zehranur Aydemir; AK Party
MP	Mevlüt Karakaya; MHP	
MP	Koray Aydın; İYİ	
MP	İbrahim Halil Oral; İYİ	Ahmet Eşref Fakıbaba; İYİ
MP	Ali Haydar Hakverdi; CHP	Sadullah Ergin; CHP / DEVA
MP	Bülent Kuşoğlu; CHP	Mustafa Nedim Yamalı; CHP / SAADET
MP	Gamze Taşcıer; CHP	
MP	Tekin Bingöl; CHP	Deniz Demir; CHP
MP	Levent Gök; CHP	Okan Konuralp; CHP
MP	Filiz Kerestecioğlu; HDP	Aliye Timisi Ersever; CHP

MPs for Ankara (I), 2002-2018
Election	2002 (22nd parliament)	2007 (23rd parliament)	2011 (24th parliament)	Jun 2015 (25th parliament)	Nov 2015 (26th Parliament)
MP	Bülent Gedikli; AK Party			Murat Alparslan; AK Party	
MP	Mehmet Zekai Özcan; AK Party		Ülker Güzel; AK Party	Ahmet Gündoğdu; AK Party	
MP	Faruk Koca; AK Party		Reha Denemeç; AK Party	Ali İhsan Arslan; AK Party	
MP	Cemil Çicek; AK Party		Tülay Selamoğlu; AK Party		Fatih Şahin; AK Party
MP	İsmail Alptekin; AK Party	Zeynep Dağı; AK Party	Fatih Şahin; AK Party	Ertan Aydın; AK Party	
MP	Ersönmez Yarbay; AK Party	Burhan Kayatürk; AK Party	Yalçın Akdoğan; AK Party		
MP	Remziye Öztoprak; AK Party	Nazmi Haluk Özdalga; AK Party		Jülide Sarıeroğlu; AK Party	
MP	Ali Babacan; AK Party			Mustafa Erdem; MHP	Ali Babacan; AK Party
MP	İsmail Değerli; CHP	Bekir Aksoy; MHP	Zühal Topcu; MHP		
MP	Mehmet Tomanbay; CHP	Yıldırım Tuğrul Türkeş; MHP / AK Party			Erkan Haberal; MHP
MP	Eşref Erdem; CHP		Aylin Nazlıaka; CHP		
MP	Oya Araslı; CHP	Hakkı Suha Okay; CHP	Bülent Kuşoğlu; CHP		
MP	Yılmaz Ateş; CHP	Nesrin Baytok; CHP	Levent Gök; CHP		
MP	Önder Sav; CHP		Emine Ülker Tarhan; CHP / ANAPAR	Ali Haydar Hakverdi; CHP	
MP	Ayşe Gülsün Bilgehan; CHP	Emrehan Halıcı; CHP / e-Parti		Ayşe Gülsün Bilgehan; CHP	
MP	No seat		Sencer Ayata; CHP	Necati Yılmaz; CHP	
MP	No seat			Tekin Bingöl; CHP	
MP	No seat			Sırrı Süreyya Önder; HDP	

== General elections ==
=== June 2015 ===
June 2015 general election: Ankara (I)
Party	Candidate	Votes	%	±%
AK Party	7 elected: 1. Yalçın Akdoğan ✓; 2. Ahmet Gündoğdu ✓; 3. Ali İhsan Arslan ✓; 4. Jülide Sarıeroğlu ✓; 5. Murat Alparslan ✓; 6. Ertan Aydın ✓; 7. Tülay Selamoğlu ✓; 8. Fatih Şahin ✗; 9. Muhammet Emin Zararsız ✗; 10. Hasan Albayrak ✗; 11. Ercan Kınacı ✗; 12. Barış Aydın ✗; 13. Murat Köse ✗; 14. Hasan Karagöz ✗; 15. Hatice Demirtaş ✗; 16. Haydar Şahin ✗; 17. Fatma Coşar Karacan ✗; 18. Mehmet Ali Canlı ✗	673,831	36.64	▼8.16
CHP	7 elected: 1. Ayşe Gülsün Bilgehan ✓; 2. Necati Yılmaz ✓; 3. Tekin Bingöl ✓; 4. Aylin Nazlıaka ✓; 5. Levent Gök ✓; 6. Ali Haydar Hakverdi ✓; 7. Bülent Kuşoğlu ✓; 8. Hikmet Tepe ✗; 9. Gamze Taşçıer ✗; 10. Emre Doğan ✗; 11. Selahattin Emre ✗; 12. Durdu Özbolat ✗; 13. Sema Aksoy ✗; 14. Kazım Sönmez ✗; 15. Faruk Özdemir ✗; 16. Erdoğan Kılıç ✗; 17. Birsen Temir ✗; 18. İlyas Güven Eroğlu ✗	610,227	33.18	▼2.40
MHP	3 elected: 1. Yıldırım Tuğrul Türkeş ✓; 2. Zühal Topcu ✓; 3. Mustafa Erdem ✓; 4. Erkan Bülent Haberal ✗; 5. Nevzat Aypek ✗; 6. Bircan Akyıldız ✗; 7. Sultan Gündüz ✗; 8. Ayşe Sibel Ersoy ✗; 9. İbrahim Çiftçi ✗; 10. Aytaç Özel ✗; 11. Esin Gürel ✗; 12. Şener Beşiroğlu ✗; 13. Şahin Önalan ✗; 14. Umutcan Günerkaya ✗; 15. Ali Keleş ✗; 16. Ülkü Gök Güven ✗; 17. Pınar Gülsoy ✗; 18. İbrahim Kuş ✗	332,095	18.06	▲3.28
HDP	1 elected: 1. Sırrı Süreyya Önder ✓; 2. Serkan Özkan ✗; 3. Songül Erol Abdil ✗; 4. Perihan Kiraz ✗; 5. Firdevs Kantar ✗; 6. Celal Demir ✗; 7. Zelal Deniz Demir ✗; 8. Mehmet Tekin Okay ✗; 9. İsmehan Sarıateş ✗; 10. Burcu Yıldırım ✗; 11. Bülent Durukan ✗; 12. Nursel Güvendir ✗; 13. Emin Çarbuğa ✗; 14. Sündüs Keleş ✗; 15. Hüseyin Ataş ✗; 16. Ahmet Demirel ✗; 17. Nazik Kılıç ✗; 18. Abdülkani Tatlısu ✗	120,043	6.53	▲6.53
Independent	None elected: Ahmet Yalavaç Çağlar Çağanlar Ercan Yenal Faruk Arslandok Mehmet Oktay Kallioğlu Melek Altıntaş Nazmi Ardıç Tufan Sevim ✗	41,559	2.26	▼1.06
SAADET	None elected: 1. Remzi Çayır ✗; 2. Tevfik Eren ✗; 3. Samet Sami Temel ✗; 4. Gökhan Tüzün ✗; 5. İsrafil Bayrakci ✗; 6. Hikmet Karaca ✗; 7. Ersan Bilgin ✗; 8. Orhan Şahin ✗; 9. Yusuf Sunar ✗; 10. Fatıma Bağçeci ✗; 11. Zübeyt Bozkurt ✗; 12. Abdurrahman Yılmaz ✗; 13. Ali İhsan Kayaaslan ✗; 14. Fazlı Centilmen ✗; 15. İrfan Akbayır ✗; 16. Barış Ezer ✗; 17. Yasin Şen ✗; 18. Ali Çırak ✗	31,653	1.72	▲0.10
Patriotic	None elected: 1. İsmail Hakkı Pekin ✗; 2. Fatma Mehpare Çelik ✗; 3. Nusret Senem ✗; 4. Hamit Zafer Kars ✗; 5. Hasan Fırat Kayaönü ✗; 6. Ahmet Sevük ✗; 7. Evren Mumcu ✗; 8. Halime Tosun ✗; 9. Funda Çakar ✗; 10. Ali Sami Utku ✗; 11. Hasan Dülgeroğlu ✗; 12. Meltem Türkoğlu ✗; 13. Tülay Toraman ✗; 14. Uğur Akgül ✗; 15. Mustafa Su ✗; 16. Yalçın Mıhçı ✗; 17. Erkan Yaykır ✗; 18. Nazım Yardım ✗	11,136	0.61	▲0.61
BTP	None elected: 1. Ata Selçuk ✗; 2. Salih Türkyılmaz ✗; 3. Murat Özilhan ✗; 4. Lütfullah Önder ✗; 5. İzzet Yaşar ✗; 6. Aydın İlik ✗; 7. Mevlüt Emre Vona ✗; 8. Nuri Hacıevliyagil ✗; 9. Ayvaz Adıgüzel ✗; 10. Sibel Kılıç ✗; 11. Abidin Uluyol ✗; 12. Caner Yatar ✗; 13. Fatma Göksel ✗; 14. Yunus Atıf Akkaya ✗; 15. Ertuğrul Patır ✗; 16. Fahri Yılmaz ✗; 17. Hakan Şireci ✗; 18. Saadet Doğan ✗	4,115	0.22	▲0.22
DSP	None elected: 1. Hasan Erçelebi ✗; 2. Mehmet Necati Utkan ✗; 3. Hasan Uğurtürk ✗; 4. İbrahim Halil Yumuşak ✗; 5. Dilek Dengizek Ersanal ✗; 6. Narin Ertekin ✗; 7. Mübehher Özbek ✗; 8. Çetin Ayberkin ✗; 9. Zehra Sema Okutan ✗; 10. Namık Kaya ✗; 11. Eren Kılıç ✗; 12. Zafer Gürleyen ✗; 13. Tülay Kandemir ✗; 14. Yasemin Atay ✗; 15. Tuğçe Tekçe ✗; 16. İsmet Sarıkaya ✗; 17. Hasan Kaya ✗; 18. Ayşe Bölükbaşı ✗	2,627	0.14	▼0.03
TURK Party	None elected: 1. Şaha Elif Ergin ✗; 2. Güliz Bayramoğlu ✗; 3. Nilüfer Zübeyde Yirmibeşoğlu ✗; 4. Kazım Yıldırım ✗; 5. İlker Uras ✗; 6. Mürsel Yurtlu ✗; 7. Dilber Sarıkaya ✗; 8. Hande Balcı ✗; 9. Özkan Akgün ✗; 10. Mustafa Kubaşık ✗; 11. Gökçe Taşkıran ✗; 12. Mehmet Karabulut ✗; 13. Ümmügül Şimşek ✗; 14. Ahmet Durgut ✗; 15. Yıldız Kılıç ✗; 16. Ömer Ateş ✗; 17. Haci Koyunsever ✗; 18. Zekeriya Ayakci ✗	2,371	0.13	▲0.13
DP	None elected: 1. Mehmet Özdemir ✗; 2. Birol Gökçe ✗; 3. Muzaffer Babadağ ✗; 4. Arif Varmış ✗; 5. Abdurrahman Özdere ✗; 6. Fatih Yıldız ✗; 7. Ömer Sabri Yolaş ✗; 8. Ömer Şenöz ✗; 9. Yavuz Gökhan Uluser ✗; 10. Selahattin Karakaya ✗; 11. Erkut Kubat ✗; 12. Sedat Apaydın ✗; 13. Fatma Şükran Gümüş ✗; 14. Kerim Bilgehan ✗; 15. Şerafettin Yener ✗; 16. Güler Kurt ✗; 17. Fahrettin Gün ✗; 18. İsa Bulut ✗	1,674	0.09	▼0.31
AnaParti	None elected: 1. Emine Ülker Tarhan ✗; 2. Pınar Akgül Doğusoy ✗; 3. Nedim Çekmen ✗; 4. Engin Balım ✗; 5. Nafiz Şahin ✗; 6. Buğra Şengün ✗; 7. Kübra Zuhal ✗; 8. Ahmet Volkan Arpacı ✗; 9. Emine Gül Savcı ✗; 10. Nilay Burçoğlu ✗; 11. Fatma Hicran Bilir ✗; 12. Nurdan Özdemir ✗; 13. Ümit Tazegül ✗; 14. İrem Geylani ✗; 15. Koray Güleçin ✗; 16. Esin Fatma Arıöz ✗; 17. İlkay Eski ✗; 18. Bayram Ateş ✗	1,452	0.08	▲0.08
HKP	None elected: 1. Azime Ayça Alpel ✗; 2. Sait Kıran ✗; 3. Selahaddin Kalkan ✗; 4. Emirali Karadoğan ✗; 5. Kubilay Akçay ✗; 6. Meliha Kuşçu ✗; 7. Şükrü Avşaroğlu ✗; 8. Doğan Erkan ✗; 9. Gizem Türker ✗; 10. Selçuk Akbina ✗; 11. Mustafa Bayyar ✗; 12. Sultan Caner ✗; 13. Gülay Bozgun ✗; 14. Erdoğan Öner ✗; 15. Türkan Eroğlu ✗; 16. Yeter Karslı ✗; 17. Fadime Yıldız ✗; 18. Murat Görür ✗	1,326	0.07	▲0.07
LDP	None elected: 1. İbrahim Özdoğan ✗; 2. Rengin Akdağ ✗; 3. Evrenay Evrentan Satı ✗; 4. Raif Eyüboğlu ✗; 5. Abdurrahman Eser Esin ✗; 6. Erdoğan Yazgan ✗; 7. Refik Sarıkaya ✗; 8. Erdem Ceceli ✗; 9. Seyfettin Serdaroğlu ✗; 10. Ali İhsan Kulup ✗; 11. Recai Ünlü ✗; 12. Selma Kuzay ✗; 13. İbrahim Kocaman ✗; 14. Kadir Atalay ✗; 15. Ali Coşkun ✗; 16. Ekrem Özgü ✗; 17. Ümit Özbay ✗; 18. Bilal Gel ✗	1,238	0.07	▲0.03
HAK-PAR	None elected: 1. İhsan Çoban ✗; 2. Mustafa Taşçı ✗; 3. Mehmet Nuri Dervişbeyaz ✗; 4. Dilşah Aras ✗; 5. İsmet Kaya ✗; 6. Fazlı Taşkan ✗; 7. Sümrü Tüverekli ✗; 8. Ayşe Unudulur ✗; 9. Ayşe Temel ✗; 10. Firdes Yorulmaz ✗; 11. Semra Günaydın ✗; 12. İrfan Korucu ✗; 13. Osman Sezgin ✗; 14. Hüseyin Akyıldız ✗; 15. Hacı Kadir Koçak ✗; 16. Esma Polat ✗; 17. Tarık Genç ✗; 18. Irgat Polat ✗	1,110	0.06	▲0.06
Communist	None elected: 1. Özlem Şen Abay ✗; 2. Mehtap Arslan ✗; 3. Sevilay Cenik ✗; 4. Burçin Korkmaz ✗; 5. Güneş Şentürk ✗; 6. Özten Karataş ✗; 7. Dilşad Şimşek ✗; 8. Pınar Sert ✗; 9. Elif Aydemir ✗; 10. Sevgi Ferad ✗; 11. Işın Sakallı ✗; 12. Meral Arslan ✗; 13. Müge Elmas ✗; 14. Ersin Kaplan ✗; 15. Ebru Karakoç ✗; 16. Etkin Bilen Eratalay ✗; 17. Ekin Eylem Kaya ✗; 18. Emine Apaydın ✗	873	0.05	▲0.05
Centre	None elected: 1. Yaşar Yazıcıoğlu ✗; 2. Hüsnü Döğer ✗; 3. Abdullah Aydınlı ✗; 4. İsmail Cem Erel ✗; 5. Ziya Taşkın ✗; 6. Mehlika Başar ✗; 7. Evrensel Emre ✗; 8. Engin Eryılmaz ✗; 9. Fatma Ulusoy ✗; 10. Aslıhan Günel ✗; 11. İlknur Türkiş ✗; 12. Kenan Zeki Uçgunoğlu ✗; 13. Ömer Ünal ✗; 14. Eda Fatma Kahraman ✗; 15. Suna Turap ✗; 16. Cemal Kaplan ✗; 17. Bahriye Öztürk ✗; 18. Sabit Saruhan ✗	728	0.04	▲0.04
MP	None elected: 1. Abdulhaluk Mehmet Çay ✗; 2. Hacı Ali Özdemir ✗; 3. Ali Osman Türkmen ✗; 4. Bilal Şentürk ✗; 5. Süleyman Sarı ✗; 6. Salih Koç ✗; 7. Zafer İncekara ✗; 8. Fatma Özdemir ✗; 9. Ali Özdemir ✗; 10. Hasan Ural ✗; 11. Seyfettin Özyurt ✗; 12. Mahmut Yavuz Şengör ✗; 13. Mehmet Toptaş ✗; 14. Salih Ereğiz ✗; 15. Mustafa Bozoğlu ✗; 16. Ayten Türkmen ✗; 17. Sabire Tokyay ✗; 18. Feride Karasu ✗	584	0.03	▼0.11
YP	None elected: 1. Barış Bilgin Dilmen ✗; 2. Mahmut Nedim Ozaner ✗; 3. Hakan Önder ✗; 4. Rüştü Vardar ✗; 5. Halit Dervişoğlu ✗; 6. Kadriye Figen Dutlu ✗; 7. Tevfik Fikret Başçı ✗; 8. Serkan Çatma ✗; 9. Salih Tantan ✗; 10. Rifat Özgüner ✗; 11. Emine Akçuraya ✗; 12. Adem Zeren ✗; 13. Ümit Basri Nar ✗; 14. Selami Karakuş ✗; 15. Seyfet Ay ✗; 16. Mehmet Topçu ✗; 17. Ahmet Haklı ✗; 18. Halil Yağcı ✗	362	0.02	▲0.02
DYP	No candidates	52	0.00	▼0.10
HAP	No candidates	24	0.00	▲0.00
Total votes		1,839,080		
Rejected ballots		32,155	1.72	▲0.19
Turnout		1,871,235	88.13	▼0.39

=== 2011 ===
2011 general election: Ankara (I)
Party	Candidate	Votes	%	±%
AK Party	8 elected 0: 1. Ali Babacan ✓; 2. Bülent Gedikli ✓; 3. Reha Denemeç ✓; 4. Tülay Selamoğlu ✓; 5. Nazmi Haluk Özdalga ✓; 6. Yalçın Akdoğan ✓; 7. Fatih Şahin ✓; 8. Ülker Güzel ✓; 9. Ercan Kınacı ✗; 10. Alaaddin Varol ✗; 11. Nihan Turna Sakaltaş ✗; 12. Ahmet Sinan Poyraz ✗; 13. Rıza Gezer ✗; 14. Faik Güngör ✗; 15. Ümit Altuntaş ✗; 16. Yasin Bölükbaşı ✗	693,413	44.80	▲1.66
CHP	6 elected ▲1: 1. Süleyman Sencer Ayata ✓; 2. Mehmet Emrehan Halıcı ✓; 3. Emine Ülker Tarhan ✓; 4. Aylin Nazlıaka ✓; 5. Bülent Kuşoğlu ✓; 6. Levent Gök ✓; 7. Emre Doğan ✗; 8. İlyas Güven Eroğlu ✗; 9. Veli Özdemir ✗; 10. Bayraktar Bayraktar ✗; 11. Necati Yılmaz ✗; 12. Faruk Özdemir ✗; 13. Aysin Tektaş Keskin ✗; 14. Gamze Şengel ✗; 15. Engin Balım ✗; 16. Çetin Canbazoğlu ✗	550,710	35.58	▲3.80
MHP	2 elected 0: 1. Yıldırım Tuğrul Türkeş ✓; 2. Zühal Topcu ✓; 3. Mehmet Zekai Özcan ✗; 4. Doğan Cansızlar ✗; 5. Mevlüt Karakaya ✗; 6. Recep Dumanlı ✗; 7. Mehmet Sami Uzun ✗; 8. Selçuk Coşkun ✗; 9. Rıfkı Ünal ✗; 10. Çağrı Aci ✗; 11. Ayhan Çelik ✗; 12. Yıldırım Ak ✗; 13. Sema Doğan ✗; 14. Asım Açıkel ✗; 15. Sedat Yazırlı ✗; 16. Halil Güzel ✗	228,825	14.78	▼0.64
Independent	None elected: Ceyhan Mumcu ✗ Hasan Yurtoğlu ✗ Mustafa Hulki Cevizoğlu ✗ Hamza Dürgen ✗ Cercis Utaş ✗ Hasan Coşar ✗	18,600	1.20	▼0.55
Büyük Birlik	None elected: 1. Yalçın Topçu ✗; 2. Üzeyir Tunç ✗; 3. Hakkı Öznur ✗; 4. Nizam Şahin ✗; 5. Şule Demirkale ✗; 6. Orhan Şahin ✗; 7. Gültekin Çoruk ✗; 8. İlker Kayalıoğlu ✗; 9. Murat Battal ✗; 10. Durmuş Ali Öz ✗; 11. Rana Ağırsoy ✗; 12. Hüseyin Türkoğlu ✗; 13. Çetin Sadık Aslan ✗; 14. Nuray Özmen ✗; 15. Hasan Altunbaş ✗; 16. İdris Katar ✗	15,589	1.01	▲1.01
HAS Party	None elected: 1. Çağrı Erhan ✗; 2. Aydın Yardımcı ✗; 3. Medeni Akay ✗; 4. Rıza Kuyrukcu ✗; 5. Saliha Sasa ✗; 6. Ahmet Münir Yaşar ✗; 7. İsmail Karaduman ✗; 8. Feryal Tanrıverdi ✗; 9. Suat Pamir Çelebi Anteplioğlu ✗; 10. Hikmet Uzun ✗; 11. Semra Ertekin ✗; 12. Tayyar Güneri ✗; 13. Aynur Kaplan ✗; 14. Hasan Atcı ✗; 15. Ümit Haluk Aydınoğlu ✗; 16. Yakup Helvalı ✗	11,039	0.71	▲0.71
SAADET	None elected: 1. Oya Akgönenç Muğisuddin ✗; 2. Musa Okçu ✗; 3. Mehmet Emin Erol ✗; 4. Hamdi Konuk ✗; 5. Erhan Albayrak ✗; 6. Orhan Tatlı ✗; 7. İsrail Bayrakcı ✗; 8. Ali Gülhan ✗; 9. Şükrü Okur ✗; 10. Hüseyin Erdem ✗; 11. Mahmut Çolak ✗; 12. Sabri Bayraktar ✗; 13. Bülent Hüseyin Özçelik ✗; 14. Ahmet Gençyiğit ✗; 15. Mustafa Erkalan ✗; 16. Burhan Kırman ✗	9,422	0.61	▼0.56
DP	None elected: 1. Mehmet Salih Uzun ✗; 2. Cahit Kale ✗; 3. Belkıs Meltem özen ✗; 4. Murat Özilhan ✗; 5. Harun Kara ✗; 6. Hasan Dağ ✗; 7. İsmail Bulut ✗; 8. Peyman Yüksel ✗; 9. Murat Köseoğlu ✗; 10. İnci Akıncı ✗; 11. Okan Yüksel ✗; 12. Alp Kağan Polatkan ✗; 13. Suzan Yüksel ✗; 14. Mert Altan ✗; 15. Perihan Özcan ✗; 16. Mustafa Doğan ✗	6,173	0.40	▼2.39
HEPAR	None elected: 1. Sevinç Paşaoğlu ✗; 2. Hakan Karadağ ✗; 3. Hamdi Van ✗; 4. Ali Ayaz ✗; 5. Feza Aydan Işıklar ✗; 6. Semiha Dikmen ✗; 7. Mehmet Ekrem Eren ✗; 8. Şilay Yiğitsoy ✗; 9. Yüksel Atak ✗; 10. Nesimi Diler ✗; 11. Halil Belbüken ✗; 12. Hakan Mesut Şahinoğlu ✗; 13. Ferudun Doğan ✗; 14. Sakine Ayaz ✗; 15. Yuzuf Avcı ✗; 16. Ali Telli ✗	3,588	0.23	▲0.23
DSP	None elected: 1. Hikmet Sami Türk ✗; 2. Nilüfer İlbey ✗; 3. Nahit Söyler ✗; 4. Ruşen Süsler ✗; 5. Ayten Şahin ✗; 6. Ayşen Sibel İnözü ✗; 7. Mehmet Canbolat ✗; 8. Şaamettin Emektar ✗; 9. Hüsniye Erdoğan ✗; 10. Necdet Cabioğlu ✗; 11. Hikmet Kipriksiz ✗; 12. Yahya Karagöz ✗; 13. Yüksel Erdoğan ✗; 14. Belma Açar ✗; 15. Altan Canik ✗; 16. Ünsal Demiralp ✗	2,693	0.17	N/A
TKP	None elected: 1. Fundagül Çamalan ✗; 2. Özlem Şen Abay ✗; 3. Mustafa Ceydilek ✗; 4. Bekir Tuncay Çelen ✗; 5. Abdülkadir Sev ✗; 6. Bekir Sami Öztürk ✗; 7. Hasan Güney ✗; 8. Gülcan Altundaş ✗; 9. Turgay Ön ✗; 10. Arif Hikmet Basa ✗; 11. Başak İleri ✗; 12. Ömür Yazıcı ✗; 13. Selvi Korkmaz ✗; 14. Rukiye Kara ✗; 15. İmran Öztürk ✗; 16. Ali Rıza Elmas ✗	2,449	0.14	▼0.09
MP	None elected: 1. Hacı Ali Özdemir ✗; 2. Ali Osman Türkmen ✗; 3. Mahmut Aslan ✗; 4. Süleyman Sarı ✗; 5. Zafer İncekara ✗; 6. Ömer Lütfi Yaman ✗; 7. Hasan Özdemir ✗; 8. Halil Karasu ✗; 9. Bilal Şentürk ✗; 10. Mehmet Akkaya ✗; 11. Ayten Türkmen ✗; 12. Hasan Ural ✗; 13. Latife Açıkgöz ✗; 14. Murat Toptaş ✗; 15. Aynur Doğan ✗; 16. Sabire Tokyay ✗	2,200	0.14	▲0.14
DYP	None elected: 1. Özkan Ertekin ✗; 2. Murat Civelek ✗; 3. Sadık Çiloğlu ✗; 4. Hasan Yıldırım ✗; 5. Bülent Güneş ✗; 6. İlknur Erbaş ✗; 7. Adem Şahin ✗; 8. Bedia Selen ✗; 9. Osman Baysan ✗; 10. Barboros Çalışkan ✗; 11. Necmi Karakoç ✗; 12. Nuray Fidan ✗; 13. Fatma Erol ✗; 14. Cem Seylan ✗; 15. İlhami Ergin ✗; 16. Tahsin Uysal ✗	1,585	0.10	▲0.10
Nationalist Conservative	None elected: 1. Uğur Akarçay ✗; 2. Gürhan Karabacak ✗; 3. Elvan Yılmaz ✗; 4. Tevit Pala ✗; 5. Koray Kalaycı ✗; 6. İbrahim Çağdan Ünlü ✗; 7. Ülker Halıcıgil ✗; 8. Nilüfer Bilge ✗; 9. Hatice Yılmaz ✗; 10. Hülya Pehlivan ✗; 11. Kıyafet Yılmaz ✗; 12. Yeter Yılmaz ✗; 13. Gürsay Bilgin ✗; 14. Hakan Yılmaz ✗; 15. Necati Kalkan ✗; 16. Esma Akkurt ✗	821	0.05	▲0.05
Liberal Democrat	None elected: 1. Cem Toker ✗; 2. Yusuf Ziya Kıvanç ✗; 3. Hüseyin Tüzün ✗; 4. Erol Kömürcü ✗; 5. Gül Aysoy ✗; 6. Atilla Karaçil ✗; 7. Ali İhsan Kulup ✗; 8. Ömer Adıgüzel ✗; 9. Mehmet Karayel ✗; 10. Evreney Evrentan Satı ✗; 11. Asiye Baburhan ✗; 12. Yaşar Kalender ✗; 13. Songül Önen ✗; 14. Rıdvan Sarıaslan ✗; 15. Cemal Yaman ✗; 16. Yusuf Şimşek ✗	581	0.04	▼0.04
Labour	No candidates	0	0.00	0.00
Total votes		1,547,688	100.00	
Rejected ballots		24,080	1.53	▼0.10
Turnout		1,571,768	88.52	▲3.73
AK Party hold Majority		142,703	9.22	▼1.97
