= Tekin Bingöl =

Turkish politician (born 1955)

Tekin Bingöl MP
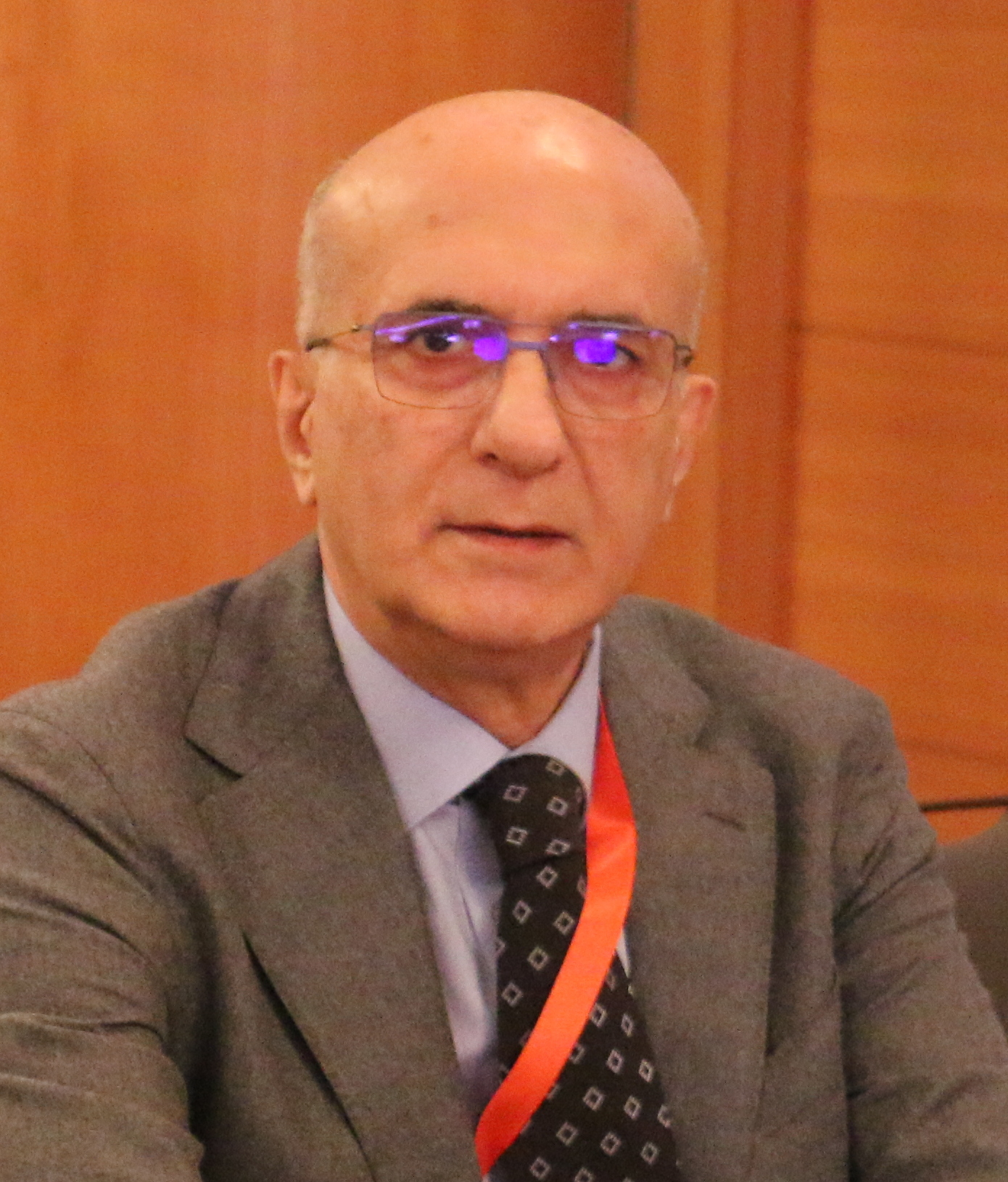

Deputy Speaker of the Grand National Assembly
- Incumbent
- Assumed office 28 July 2026 (New Party)
- Speaker: Numan Kurtulmuş
- Serving with: Bekir Bozdağ; Pervin Buldan; Celal Adan
- Preceded by: Himself
- In office 14 June 2025 – 24 July 2026 (Republican People's Party)
- Speaker: Numan Kurtulmuş
- Serving with: Bekir Bozdağ; Pervin Buldan; Celal Adan
- Preceded by: Gülizar Biçer Karaca
- Succeeded by: Himself

Deputy Leader of the Republican People's Party
- In office 8 May 2014 – 22 March 2022
- Leader: Kemal Kılıçdaroğlu

Member of the Grand National Assembly
- Incumbent
- Assumed office 23 June 2015
- Constituency: Ankara (II) (June 2015, Nov 2015); Ankara (I) (2018); Ankara (III) (2023)
- In office 23 July 2007 – 23 April 2011
- Constituency: Ankara (II) (2007)

Personal details
- Born: 1 August 1955 (age 71) Bitlis, Turkey
- Party: New Party (2026–present)
- Other political affiliations: Republican People's Party (?–2026)
- Children: 3
- Education: Hacettepe University
- Occupation: Doctor, politician

Tekin Bingöl (born 1 August 1955) is a Turkish politician who served as the Deputy Leader of the Republican People's Party responsible for political organisation from 8 May 2014 to 22 March 2022. He has served as a Member of Parliament for Ankara's second electoral district since 7 June 2015, elected at the June 2015 general election. He previously served as an MP for Ankara's second electoral district between 2007 and 2011.

== Early life and career ==
Tekin Bingöl was born on 1 August 1955 in Bitlis and graduated from Hacettepe University Faculty of Medicine. He became a medical doctor, working in small villages in Bitlis and later becoming a private sector medical practitioner. He was also involved in business administration in the public sector before entering politics. He speaks English at a semi-fluent level, is married and has three children.

== Political career ==
Bingöl was elected as a Member of Parliament for Ankara's second electoral district in the 2007 general election from the Republican People's Party. After the election of Kemal Kılıçdaroğlu as the party's leader during the party's 2010 ordinary convention, Tekin became the Deputy General Secretary of the CHP. He left Parliament at the 2011 general election but continued as a CHP politician, being appointed as the Deputy Leader of the party responsible for political organisation on 8 May 2014. He re-entered Parliament, again as a CHP MP from Ankara's second electoral district at the June 2015 general election, which resulted in a hung parliament.

=== Interim election cabinet offer ===
Tekin Bingöl was one of the five CHP politicians who were offered ministerial positions by Justice and Development Party leader Ahmet Davutoğlu in August 2015. Davutoğlu had been tasked by President Recep Tayyip Erdoğan to form an interim election government after coalition negotiations proved unsuccessful and resulted in Erdoğan calling an early election. Since the CHP had 131 MPs during the formation of the interim government, the party was entitled to 5 ministries in the cabinet, though Kılıçdaroğlu announced that the CHP would not take part and give up their five ministries to independent politicians. Bingöl subsequently declined Davutoğlu's offer, as did the four other CHP MPs that had been offered ministerial positions.
