= Haberal =

Haberal is a Turkish surname. Notable people with the surname include:

- Erkan Haberal (born 1972), Turkish politician
- Mehmet Haberal (born 1944), transplant surgeon in Turkey
