= Aylin Nazlıaka =

Turkish businesswoman and politician (born 1968)

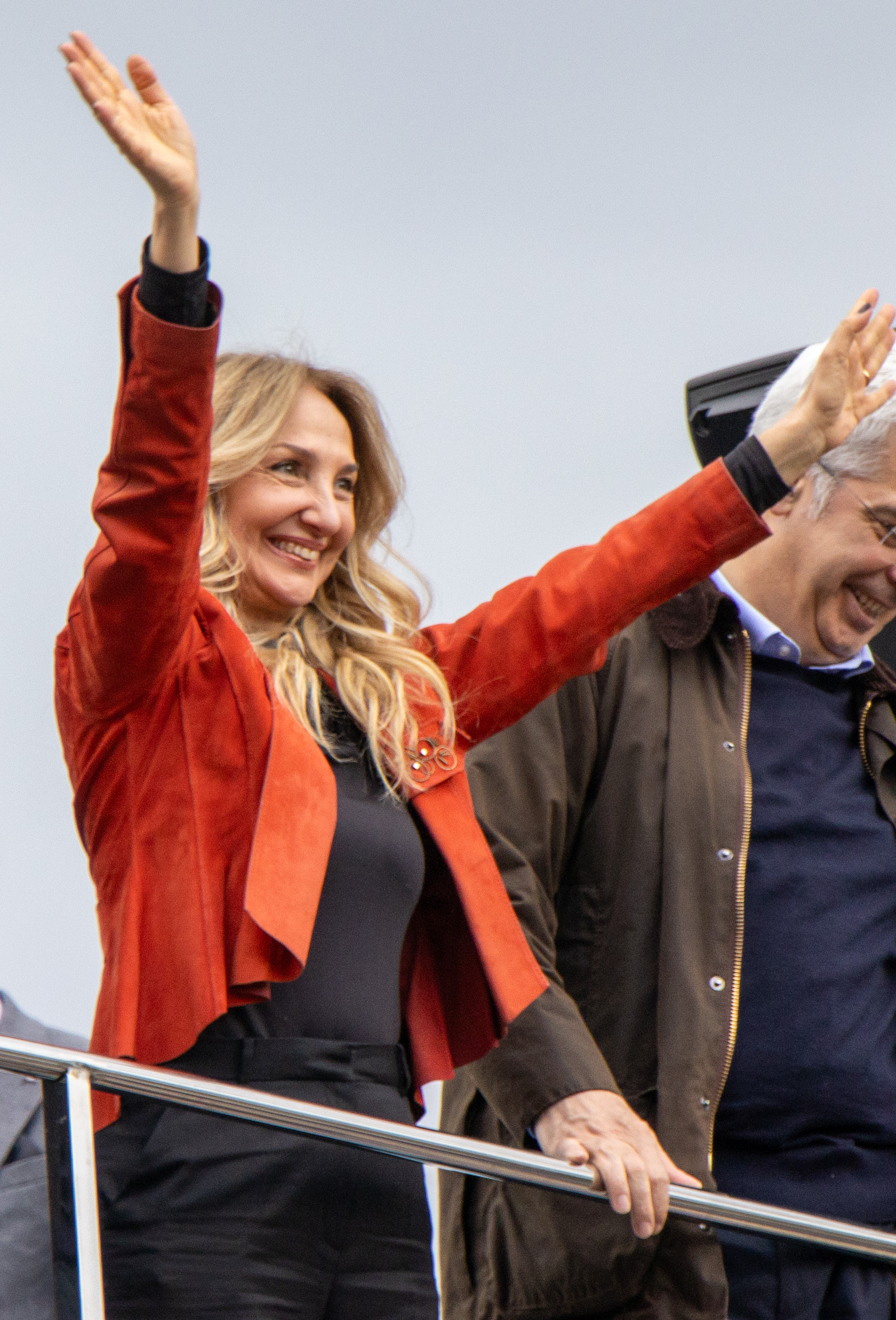

Member of the Grand National Assembly
- In office 12 June 2011 – 7 July 2018
- Constituency: Ankara (I) (2011, June 2015, Nov 2015)

Personal details
- Born: December 3, 1968 (age 57) Ankara, Turkey
- Party: Republican People's Party (CHP) (from 2019)
- Other political affiliations: Republican People's Party (CHP) (until 2016); Independent (2016 - 2019)
- Children: Two
- Education: Middle East Technical University (BS)
- Occupation: Politician, Economist

Aylin Nazlıaka (born 1968 in Ankara) is a Turkish politician and businesswoman from the Republican People's Party.

== Education and professional career ==
She holds a bachelor's degree in economics from the Middle East Technical University. She completed “Emerging Leaders” programme at Harvard Kennedy School in the USA. She started her career at private sector. At the age of 24, she decided to establish her own company, named HRM Consulting. The firm has become one of the most reputable human resources consultancy companies in Turkey. She became one of the leading names of Turkey in the scope of management and human resources. In addition to HRM Consulting, she became the partner of an international human resources company in 2008, which has offices in 52 countries.

Aylin Nazlıaka is a frequent speaker at national and international conferences. She has many articles published in journals. She gave lectures about Human Resources Management at Bilkent University. She is the Advisory Board Member of Endeavor Turkey.

== Member of Parliament ==
Thanks to a proposal made by Republican People's Party (CHP), she entered politics that has always taken her great interest and selected as the member of Party Assembly in 2010. In the elections of 2011, she has been selected as the Deputy of Ankara. Besides, she is the member of EU Harmonization and Turkey-EU Joint Parliamentary Committee at Grand National Assembly of Turkey. Nazlıaka won the pre-elections and once more she became the Member of Parliament for Ankara. Aylin Nazlıaka is the architect of the CHP's "Plus for the Youth" project which aims to create equal opportunity for unemployed young people.

Awards won include "Business Women of the Year Award", 2001; "Middle East Technical University Honor Award", 2002; "Young Business Women of the Year Award", 2008; "Awards For People Touching Lives", 2012; "Member of Parliament of the Year Award", 2012; "Women's Platform Award", 2012; "Member of Parliament of the Year Award", 2013; "Politician of the Year Award", 2013 and "Politician of the Year Award", 2014. She is married with two children.

In 2015 she claimed that, a CHP PM put down Atatürk's portrait from his office. Later he was identified as CHP Ankara PM Necati Yılmaz, whom she never publicly disclosed. She couldn't prove her claims, and resulted with a slander claim against her. The discipline committee decided to expel her with 8 against 7 votes on 4 March 2016. The same Party Assembly took a decision to make her a party member again on 15 September 2019.

On 19 January 2017 she handcuffed herself to the podium, causing a fight in the TBMM.
