= 2011 Turkish Parliament Speaker election =

2011 Turkish Parliament Speaker elections
- 4 July 2011

All 550 Members of Parliament voting in the Grand National Assembly 367 votes needed to win in the first two rounds 276 votes needed to win in the third round
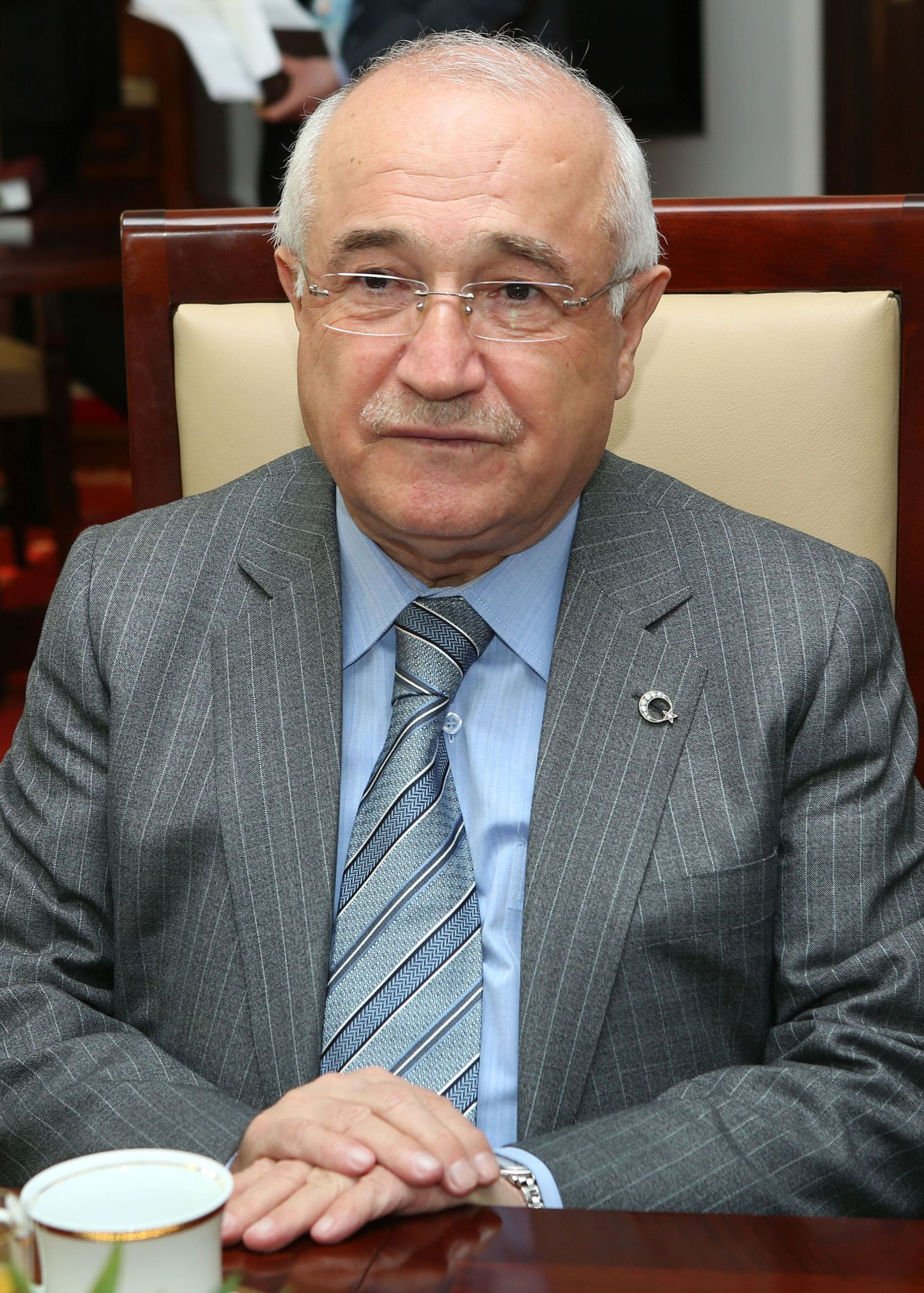

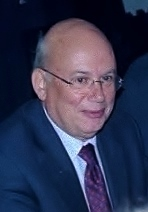
Nominee	Cemil Çiçek	Tunca Toskay
Party	AK Party	MHP
Constituency	Ankara (II)	Antalya
Round 1	302 (80.5%)	50 (13.3%)
Round 2	322 (86.1%)	52 (13.9%)
Round 3	322 (86.6%)	50 (13.4%)
Speaker before election
Mehmet Ali Şahin
AK Party
Elected Speaker
Cemil Çiçek
AK Party

The Turkish Parliament Speaker elections of 2011 were held on 4 July 2011 to elect the 25th Speaker of the Grand National Assembly. The elected speaker would preside over the 24th Parliament of Turkey, which was elected in the parliamentary election held on 12 June 2011. With the governing Justice and Development Party (AKP) holding 327 of the 550 seats (a majority of 104) in the Grand National Assembly, the election of the party's candidate Cemil Çiçek was regarded as an effective certainty.

At the age of 79, Republican People's Party (CHP) Member of Parliament Oktay Ekşi became the interim Speaker following the state opening of Parliament on 28 June by virtue of being the oldest MP elected. The official AKP candidate was Cemil Çiçek, the former Minister of Justice, though another AKP candidate Zelkif Kazdal also collected enough signatures to run. The Nationalist Movement Party (MHP) nominated Tunca Toskay as their candidate, while the CHP did not nominate anyone amid reports that the party approved of Çiçek's candidacy. Kazdal dropped out of the race after only receiving 23 votes in the first round, with Çiçek being eventually elected in the third round.

== Election process ==
The Speaker is elected by secret ballot through a maximum of four rounds held within Parliament, with a two-thirds majority of 367 votes to be elected outright in the first two rounds. If the election goes into a third round, the votes needed to win is lowered to a simple majority (276) votes. If the election goes into a fourth round, the top two candidates who won the most votes in the third round contest a run-off, with the candidate winning the highest number of votes being elected. Until the Speaker is elected, the Parliament is overseen by the oldest MP in the chamber, who was in this case Oktay Ekşi from the Republican People's Party (CHP) at age 79.

== Conduct ==
MPs are called to cast their vote by name. Only MPs who have taken the oath of office have the right to vote, limiting the eligible number of MPs to vote substantially since the Republican People's Party (CHP) and the Peace and Democracy Party (BDP) had boycotted the state opening of Parliament where the oaths were taken. This was in protest against the decision to not release several MPs from these two parties who were imprisoned at the time, which both the CHP and BDP alleged was unconstitutional.

=== CHP controversy ===
Although the CHP boycotted the state opening of Parliament on 28 June, their MPs were present at the election. The fact that they had not taken the oath of office barred them from voting or running for election. The interim speaker Oktay Ekşi gave permission for any MP who had not taken the oath to do so before the vote, though the CHP MPs refused to do so. The 35 Peace and Democracy Party MPs, who were protesting the arrest of their elected 36th MP Hatip Dicle, boycotted the vote entirely.

During the vote, Tunceli MP Kamer Genç approached the Speaker and his council to ask why he had not been called up to vote. Although the Ekşi stated that it was because he had not taken the oath, Genç argued that he had the right to vote by virtue of being elected by the people. The subsequent argument caused unrest within the chamber, with AKP MPs protesting Genç's intervention and subsequently causing a backlash from the CHP MPs. CHP leader Kemal Kılıçdaroğlu, along with other members of the CHP executive, managed to defuse the tensions.

== Candidates ==
- Cemil Çiçek, former AKP Deputy Prime Minister of Turkey and Ministry of Justice
- Tunca Toskay, former MHP Minister of State
- Zelkif Kazdal, AKP Member of Parliament for Ankara
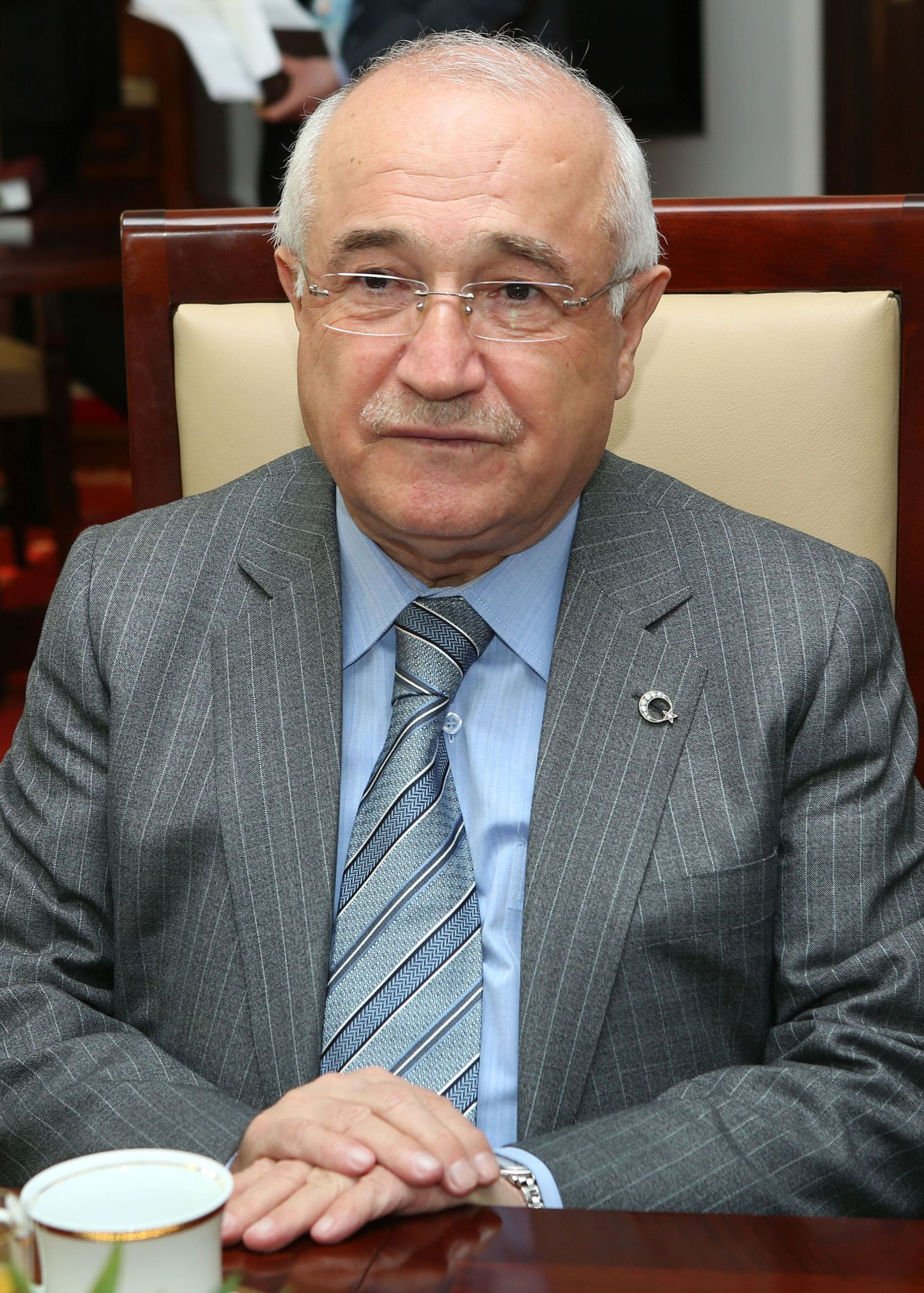
Cemil Çiçek, former AKP Deputy Prime Minister of Turkey and Ministry of Justice

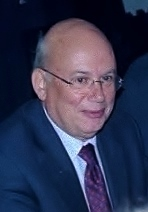
Tunca Toskay, former MHP Minister of State

== Results ==
Party	Candidate	Party MPs	July 4		
Party	Candidate	Party MPs	Round 1 367 votes to win	Round 2 367 votes to win	Round 3 276 votes to win
AKP	Cemil Çiçek	327	302	322	✓ 322
MHP	Tunca Toskay	53	50	52	50
AKP	Zelkif Kazdal	327	23	Withdrew	
Invalid			1	2	3
Blank			0	0	0
Turnout			376	376	375
Result			Inconclusive	Inconclusive	Çiçek elected
Source: Haber Türk

== See also ==
- Deputy Speaker of the Grand National Assembly
