= Yalçın Akdoğan =

Turkish politician (born 1969)

Yalçın Akdoğan MP
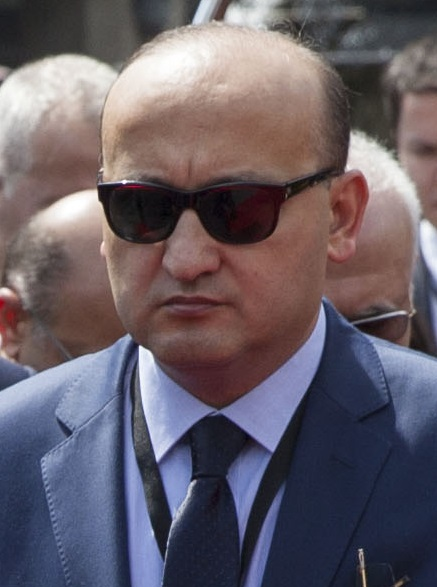

Deputy Prime Minister of Turkey
- In office 29 August 2014 – 24 May 2016
- Prime Minister: Ahmet Davutoğlu
- Served with: Bülent Arınç (2014–2015); Ali Babacan (2014–2015); Cevdet Yılmaz (2015); Numan Kurtulmuş; Lütfi Elvan; Tuğrul Türkeş; Mehmet Şimşek
- Preceded by: Emrullah İşler
- Succeeded by: Nurettin Canikli

Member of the Grand National Assembly
- Incumbent
- Assumed office 12 June 2011
- Constituency: Ankara (I) (2011, June 2015, Nov 2015, 2018)

Personal details
- Born: 22 September 1969 (age 56) Üsküdar, Istanbul, Turkey
- Party: Justice and Development Party (AKP)
- Children: 3
- Education: Journalism
- Alma mater: Anadolu University
- Occupation: Politician, academic, journalist
- Cabinet: 62nd, 63rd, 64th

Yalçın Akdoğan (born 22 September 1969) is a Turkish politician who served as Deputy Prime Minister of Turkey from 2014 to 2016. A member of the ruling Justice and Development Party (AKP), Akdoğan became a Member of Parliament representing Ankara's first electoral district at the 2011 general election and was re-elected in June 2015.

Prior to being elected Akdoğan was an academic and a journalist, having taught at the Bahçeşehir University and Anadolu University and written for Yeni Şafak and Star among others. He named Traditionalist authors René Guénon and Seyyed Hossein Nasr as his favourite writers.

Akdoğan was appointed as a Deputy Prime Minister in the Government of Ahmet Davutoğlu on 29 August 2014. He was responsible for the Solution process with Kurdish militants, designed to end the 40 years of conflict with Kurdish militants. He acted as the chief government negotiator during peace talks until they collapsed in 2015.

== Early life and career ==
Akdoğan was born on 22 September 1969 in Üsküdar, Istanbul. He graduated from Anadolu University Faculty of Communications, where he had studied in the Department of Printing and Publishing. He served his compulsory military service in the Turkish Navy between 1991 and 1993. He received a master's degree in communication sciences from the same university and pursued a doctorate concerning political and social sciences at Marmara University, becoming a Docent in 2007.

=== Journalism ===
Akdoğan began his journalism career after receiving work experience at Milliyet, he was awarded for news reporting, research and studying as well as formatting during the Hürriyet Foundation Young Journalists competition in 1991. He has worked at Yeni Şafak, Star, İç Anadolu, Milli Gazete as well as numerous magazines such as Nehir and Yeni Zemin. He later served as the advisor responsible for the press for Ministers of State.

=== Early political career ===
Akdoğan served as the Director of Education, Culture and Public Relations at the Municipality of Pendik, a district in Istanbul. He became a member of the Justice and Development Party (AKP) and became an advisor for the party leader (at the time Recep Tayyip Erdoğan). He became a Member of Parliament representing Ankara's first electoral district at the 2011 general election and was re-elected in June 2015.

== Chief Advisor to the Prime Minister ==
Akdoğan was well known for being one of the most influential contributors to shaping the Justice and Development Party's political ideology and outlook. He published his book Muhafazakâr Demokrasi (Conservative Democracy) in July 2004, discussing the AKP's declared ideological placement. In the book he used the concept of freedom of religion developed by Ali Fuat Başgil.

== Deputy Prime Minister ==
Prime Minister Recep Tayyip Erdoğan was elected President in August 2014, after which serving Foreign Minister Ahmet Davutoğlu was elected as AKP leader soon after. In the new government led by Davutoğlu, Akdoğan was appointed as Deputy Prime Minister of Turkey, serving alongside Bülent Arınç, Ali Babacan and Numan Kurtulmuş. Akdoğan's close relations to Erdoğan fuelled speculation that Davutoğlu would take a submissive approach while Erdoğan continued to pursue his political agenda despite the Presidency being a largely ceremonial office. In the new cabinet, Akdoğan mainly focussed on the peace process with Kurdish militants.

== Books ==
- Political Leadership and Erdoğan, Cambridge Scholars Publishing, 2019.

== See also ==
- Peoples' Democratic Party
- Kurdish–Turkish conflict (1978–present)
- Conservative democracy
