= Ankara (3rd electoral district) =

Electoral district for the Grand National Assembly of Turkey

Coordinates: 39°57′56″N 32°34′46″E

Ankara (III)
- electoral district for the Grand National Assembly of Turkey
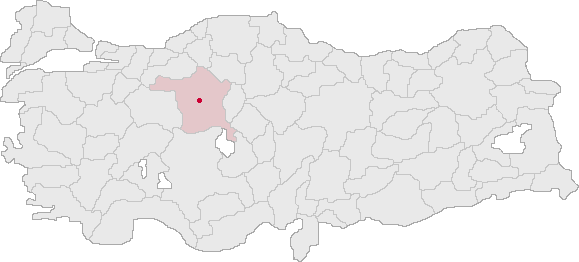
- Ankara (III) shown within Turkey
- Province: Ankara

Current electoral district
- Created: 2018
- Seats: 12
- Parent district: Ankara
- Representation
- AK Party: 5 / 12
- CHP: 3 / 12
- MHP: 2 / 12
- İYİ: 2 / 12

Ankara's third electoral district is one of three divisions of Ankara province for the purpose of elections to Grand National Assembly of Turkey. It elects twelve members of parliament (deputies) to represent the district for a four-year term by the D'Hondt method, a party-list proportional representation system. It was created during the electoral redistricting of 2018.

== Geography ==
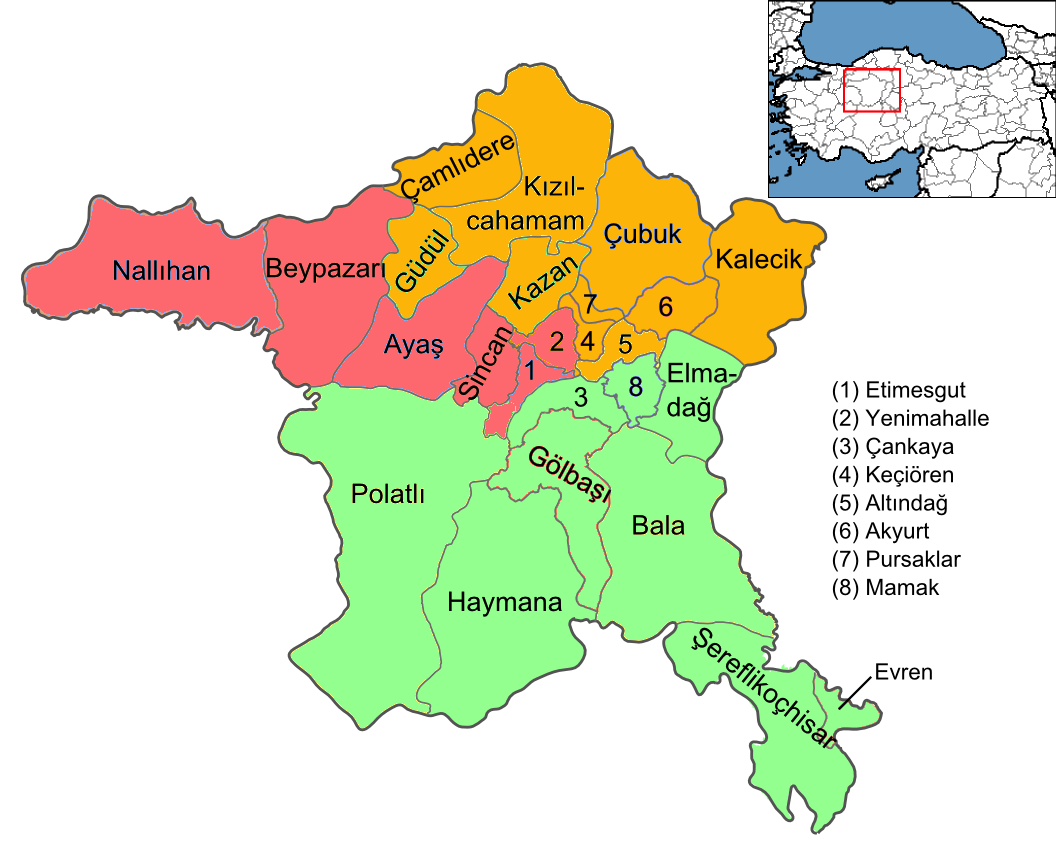
Electoral districts of Ankara province for the 2018 Turkish parliamentary election.

Ankara has three constituencies.

== Members ==
=== 2018 ===
12 members were elected in the 2018 Turkish parliamentary election:

- Naci Bostancı (Justice and Development Party)
- Asuman Erdoğan (Justice and Development Party)
- Nevzat Ceylan (Justice and Development Party)
- Barış Aydın (Justice and Development Party)
- Hacı Turan (Justice and Development Party)
- Ahmet Haluk Koç (Republican People's Party)
- Nihat Yeşil (Republican People's Party)
- Servet Ünsal (Republican People's Party)
- Yaşar Yıldırım (Nationalist Movement Party)
- Erkan Haberal (Nationalist Movement Party)
- Durmuş Yılmaz (Good Party)
- Ayhan Altıntaş (Good Party)

=== 2023 ===
12 members were elected in the 2023 Turkish parliamentary election:

- Fuat Oktay (Justice and Development Party)
- Leyla Şahin Usta (Justice and Development Party)
- Ömer İleri (Justice and Development Party)
- Asuman Erdoğan (Justice and Development Party)
- Ahmet Fethan Baykoç (Justice and Development Party)
- Tekin Bingöl (Republican People's Party)
- Umut Akdoğan (Republican People's Party)
- Mesut Doğan (Republican People's Party)
- Aylin Yaman (Republican People's Party)
- Yüksel Arslan (Good Party)
- Kürşad Zorlu (Good Party)
- Yaşar Yıldırım (Nationalist Movement Party)
