= Hakverdi =

Hakverdi is a Turkish surname. "Hak" means "right" and "verdi" means "gave" in Turkish.

== Related last names ==
Haghverdi (Persian: حق‌وردی) is a Persian surname.

Haghverdian (Armenian: Հախվերդեան; Persian: حق‌وردیان) is an Armenian related surname.

== Notable people with the surname include ==
- Ali Haydar Hakverdi (born 1979), Turkish politician
- Metin Hakverdi (born 1969), German lawyer and politician
- Karo Haghverdian (born 1945), retired Iranian Armenian football player.
- Hojjat Haghverdi (born 1993) is a footballer who plays as a defender for Sumgayit.
- Laleh Haghverdi, Iranian physicist who won the 2017 Erwin Schrödinger Prize for her PhD work
- Tooraj Haghverdi (born 1993), Iranian football referee.
