= Haluk Koç =

Turkish politician (born 1954)

Prof. Dr. Haluk Koç
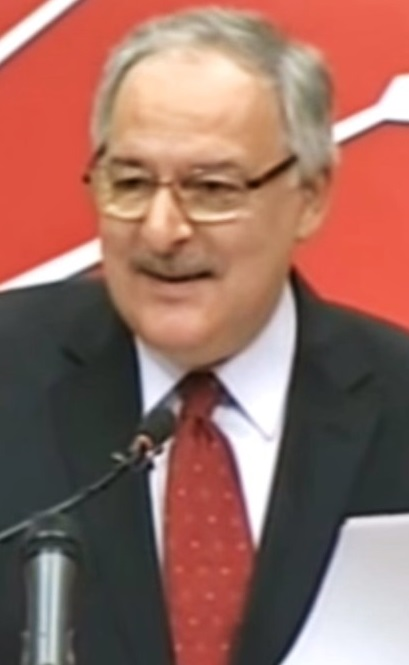

Spokesperson of the Republican People's Party
- In office 30 July 2012 – 25 January 2015
- Leader: Kemal Kılıçdaroğlu
- Preceded by: Birgül Ayman Güler
- Succeeded by: Selin Sayek Böke

Deputy leader of the Republican People's Party
- Incumbent
- Assumed office 30 July 2012
- Leader: Kemal Kılıçdaroğlu
- In office 22 May 2010 – 3 November 2010
- Leader: Kemal Kılıçdaroğlu
- Succeeded by: Faruk Loğoğlu

Member of the Grand National Assembly
- In office 18 November 2002 – 3 June 2023
- Constituency: Samsun (2002, 2007, 2011); Ankara (II) (June 2015, Nov 2015); Ankara (III) (2018)

Personal details
- Born: Ahmet Haluk Koç; 3 October 1954 (age 72) Istanbul, Turkey
- Party: Republican People's Party
- Children: 2
- Education: Ankara University
- Occupation: Surgeon, politician

Ahmet Haluk Koç (born 3 October 1954) is a Turkish politician who serves as the spokesperson and deputy leader of the Republican People's Party (CHP) since 2012. He was a Member of Parliament for Samsun between 2002 and 2015 and serves as an MP for Ankara's second electoral district as of 7 June 2015. He briefly served as deputy leader of the CHP between 22 May and 3 November 2010.

== Early life and career ==
Born in Istanbul to a family originating from the Black Sea region of Turkey, Koç studied medicine at Ankara University and became a specialist concerning internal illnesses and hematology. He became a Docent in 1990 and a Professor in 1996. He has had an excess of 200 articles published worldwide and has served as the President of the Turkish Hematology Association. He has previously chaired the European Union Congress on bone and blood transplants.

== Political career ==
In the 2002 general election, Koç was elected as a CHP MP from Samsun. He was re-elected in 2007, 2011 and is facing re-election in June 2015. When Kemal Kılıçdaroğlu was elected leader of the CHP during the party's Ordinary Convention of 2010, Koç was appointed deputy leader of the party responsible for international relations. He resigned form this position on 3 November 2010. In 2012, he was reappointed deputy leader, this time responsible for public policy and concurrently serves as the party's spokesperson.

== See also ==
- Kemal Kılıçdaroğlu
