= Nihat Yeşil =

Turkish politician (born 1957)

Member of the Grand National Assembly
- In office June 23, 2015 – May 14, 2023
- Constituency: Ankara (II) (June 2015, Nov 2015); Ankara (III) (2018)

Personal details
- Born: February 2, 1957 (age 69) Hozat, Tunceli, Turkey
- Party: Republican People's Party
- Other political affiliations: Good Party (2018); Social Democratic Populist Party (formerly)
- Education: Gazi University

Nihat Yeşil (born January 2, 1957, Hozat, Turkey) Turkish politician. He is an MP from Republican People's Party in the 25th, 26th and 27th term of the Grand National Assembly of Turkey. Before being elected as an MP, he worked on restoration and architecture.

== Biography ==
Nihat Yeşil was born on January 2, 1957, in Hozat, Tunceli. He graduated from Gazi University Faculty of Education. Yeşil, who realized the restoration projects and implementations of the First and Second Parliament, Çanakkale Martyrs' Cemeteries and Bastions and many historical monuments, is a member of Atatürkist Thought Association (ADD) and Halkevleri. He is married with three children and speaks English.

== Political career ==
Nihat Yeşil, who served as Altındağ District Chairman and Party Assembly Member in the Social Democratic Populist Party (SHP), entered parliament as a deputy of the Republican People's Party (CHP) Ankara Second District in the June 2015 Turkish general elections, when no party reached the number of seats needed to be in power alone. In the November 2015 Turkish general elections, he entered parliament again as a CHP Ankara deputy. He was a member of the Grand National Assembly of Turkey (TBMM) Interior Commission.

Before the 2018 general elections in Turkey, he joined the IYI Party to form a group in the parliament with 14 CHP deputies. He returned to the Republican People's Party with the announcement made on May 10, 2018.
