= Yusufuşağı, Evren =

Yusufuşağı
- Neighbourhood
- Location in Turkey Yusufuşağı (Turkey Central Anatolia)
- Coordinates: 39°04′N 33°41′E
- Country: Turkey
- Province: Ankara
- District: Evren
- Population (2022): 129
- Time zone: UTC+3 (TRT)

Yusufuşağı is a neighbourhood in the municipality and district of Evren, Ankara Province, Turkey. Its population is 129 (2022).
