= Cebirli, Evren =

Cebirli
- Neighbourhood
- Location in Turkey Cebirli (Turkey Central Anatolia)
- Coordinates: 39°06′N 33°40′E
- Country: Turkey
- Province: Ankara
- District: Evren
- Population (2022): 167
- Time zone: UTC+3 (TRT)

Cebirli is a neighbourhood in the municipality and district of Evren, Ankara Province, Turkey. Its population is 167 (2022).
