= Akçaali, Elmadağ =

Akçaali
- Neighbourhood
- Location in Turkey Akçaali (Turkey Central Anatolia)
- Coordinates: 39°48′N 33°06′E
- Country: Turkey
- Province: Ankara
- District: Elmadağ
- Population (2022): 249
- Time zone: UTC+3 (TRT)

Akçaali is a neighbourhood in the municipality and district of Elmadağ, Ankara Province, Turkey. Its population is 249 (2022).
