= Taburlar, Elmadağ =

Taburlar
- Neighbourhood
- Location in Turkey Taburlar (Turkey Central Anatolia)
- Coordinates: 39°48′N 33°10′E
- Country: Turkey
- Province: Ankara
- District: Elmadağ
- Population (2022): 143
- Time zone: UTC+3 (TRT)

Taburlar is a neighbourhood in the municipality and district of Elmadağ, Ankara Province, Turkey. Its population is 143 (2022).
