= Solakuşağı, Evren =

Solakuşağı
- Neighbourhood
- Location in Turkey Solakuşağı (Turkey Central Anatolia)
- Coordinates: 39.041°N 33.708°E
- Country: Turkey
- Province: Ankara
- District: Evren
- Population (2022): 119
- Time zone: UTC+3 (TRT)

Solakuşağı is a neighbourhood in the municipality and district of Evren, Ankara Province, Turkey. Its population is 119 (2022).
