= Kuşçuali, Elmadağ =

Kuşçuali
- Neighbourhood
- Location in Turkey Kuşçuali (Turkey Central Anatolia)
- Coordinates: 39°47′N 33°16′E
- Country: Turkey
- Province: Ankara
- District: Elmadağ
- Population (2022): 157
- Time zone: UTC+3 (TRT)

Kuşçuali is a neighbourhood in the municipality and district of Elmadağ, Ankara Province, Turkey. Its population is 157 (2022).
