= Çatalpınar, Evren =

Çatalpınar
- Neighbourhood
- Location in Turkey Çatalpınar (Turkey Central Anatolia)
- Coordinates: 39.0263°N 33.7210°E
- Country: Turkey
- Province: Ankara
- District: Evren
- Population (2022): 206
- Time zone: UTC+3 (TRT)

Çatalpınar is a neighbourhood in the municipality and district of Evren, Ankara Province, Turkey. Its population is 206 (2022).
