= Karacahasan, Elmadağ =

Karacahasan
- Neighbourhood
- Location in Turkey Karacahasan (Turkey Central Anatolia)
- Coordinates: 39°51′N 33°13′E
- Country: Turkey
- Province: Ankara
- District: Elmadağ
- Population (2022): 263
- Time zone: UTC+3 (TRT)

Karacahasan is a neighbourhood in the municipality and district of Elmadağ, Ankara Province, Turkey. Its population is 263 (2022).
