= Demirayak, Evren =

Demirayak
- Neighbourhood
- Location in Turkey Demirayak (Turkey Central Anatolia)
- Coordinates: 39°03′N 33°42′E
- Country: Turkey
- Province: Ankara
- District: Evren
- Population (2022): 51
- Time zone: UTC+3 (TRT)

Demirayak is a neighbourhood in the municipality and district of Evren, Ankara Province, Turkey. Its population is 51 (2022).
