= Yukarıkamışlı, Elmadağ =

Yukarıkamışlı
- Neighbourhood
- Location in Turkey Yukarıkamışlı (Turkey Central Anatolia)
- Coordinates: 39°43′52″N 33°15′22″E
- Country: Turkey
- Province: Ankara
- District: Elmadağ
- Population (2022): 48
- Time zone: UTC+3 (TRT)

Yukarıkamışlı is a neighbourhood in the municipality and district of Elmadağ, Ankara Province, Turkey. Its population is 48 (2022).
