= Deliler, Elmadağ =

Deliler
- Neighbourhood
- Location in Turkey Deliler (Turkey Central Anatolia)
- Coordinates: 39.7777°N 33.1795°E
- Country: Turkey
- Province: Ankara
- District: Elmadağ
- Population (2022): 203
- Time zone: UTC+3 (TRT)

Deliler is a neighbourhood in the municipality and district of Elmadağ, Ankara Province, Turkey. Its population is 203 (2022).
