= İbrahimbeyli, Evren =

İbrahimbeyli
- Neighbourhood
- Location in Turkey İbrahimbeyli (Turkey Central Anatolia)
- Coordinates: 38°58′N 33°42′E
- Country: Turkey
- Province: Ankara
- District: Evren
- Population (2022): 182
- Time zone: UTC+3 (TRT)

İbrahimbeyli is a neighbourhood in the municipality and district of Evren, Ankara Province, Turkey. Its population is 182 (2022).
