= Kayadibi, Elmadağ =

Kayadibi
- Neighbourhood
- Location in Turkey Kayadibi (Turkey Central Anatolia)
- Coordinates: 39.9638°N 33.3280°E
- Country: Turkey
- Province: Ankara
- District: Elmadağ
- Population (2022): 380
- Time zone: UTC+3 (TRT)

Kayadibi is a neighbourhood in the municipality and district of Elmadağ, Ankara Province, Turkey. Its population is 380 (2022).
