= Ediğe, Elmadağ =

Ediğe
- Neighbourhood
- Location in Turkey Ediğe (Turkey Central Anatolia)
- Coordinates: 39°53′N 33°17′E
- Country: Turkey
- Province: Ankara
- District: Elmadağ
- Population (2022): 91
- Time zone: UTC+3 (TRT)

Ediğe is a village in the municipality and district of Elmadağ, Ankara Province, Turkey. Its population is 91 (2022).
