= Zehranur Aydemir =

Turkish politician (born 1998)

Member of the Grand National Assembly
- Incumbent
- Assumed office 2 June 2023
- Constituency: Ankara

Personal details
- Born: 1998 (age 27–28)
- Party: Justice and Development Party

Zehranur Aydemir (born 1998) is a Turkish politician serving as a member of the Grand National Assembly since 2023. She is the youngest current member of the Assembly.
