= Süleymanlı, Elmadağ =

Süleymanlı
- Neighbourhood
- Country: Turkey
- Province: Ankara
- District: Elmadağ
- Population (2022): 200
- Time zone: UTC+3 (TRT)

Süleymanlı is a neighbourhood in the municipality and district of Elmadağ, Ankara Province, Turkey. Its population is 200 (2022).
