= Altınbaşak, Evren =

Altınbaşak
- Neighbourhood
- Location in Turkey Altınbaşak (Turkey Central Anatolia)
- Coordinates: 39.0568°N 33.6958°E
- Country: Turkey
- Province: Ankara
- District: Evren
- Population (2022): 178
- Time zone: UTC+3 (TRT)

Altınbaşak is a neighbourhood in the municipality and district of Evren, Ankara Province, Turkey. Its population is 178 (2022).
