= İnebeyli, Evren =

İnebeyli
- Neighbourhood
- Location in Turkey İnebeyli (Turkey Central Anatolia)
- Coordinates: 39°5′8″N 33°40′47″E
- Country: Turkey
- Province: Ankara
- District: Evren
- Population (2022): 82
- Time zone: UTC+3 (TRT)

İnebeyli is a neighbourhood in the municipality and district of Evren, Ankara Province, Turkey. Its population is 82 (2022).
