= Tekkeköy, Elmadağ =

Tekkeköy
- Neighbourhood
- Country: Turkey
- Province: Ankara
- District: Elmadağ
- Population (2022): 126
- Time zone: UTC+3 (TRT)

Tekkeköy (also: Tekke) is a neighbourhood in the municipality and district of Elmadağ, Ankara, Turkey. Its population is 126 (2022).
