= Eskitorunobası, Evren =

Eskitorunobası
- Neighbourhood
- Location in Turkey Eskitorunobası (Turkey Central Anatolia)
- Coordinates: 38°57′9″N 33°42′42″E
- Country: Turkey
- Province: Ankara
- District: Evren
- Population (2022): 36
- Time zone: UTC+3 (TRT)

Eskitorunobası (formerly: Torunobası) is a neighbourhood in the municipality and district of Evren, Ankara Province, Turkey. Its population is 36 (2022).
