= Ali Haydar Hakverdi =

Turkish politician (born 1979)

Ali Haydar Hakverdi MP
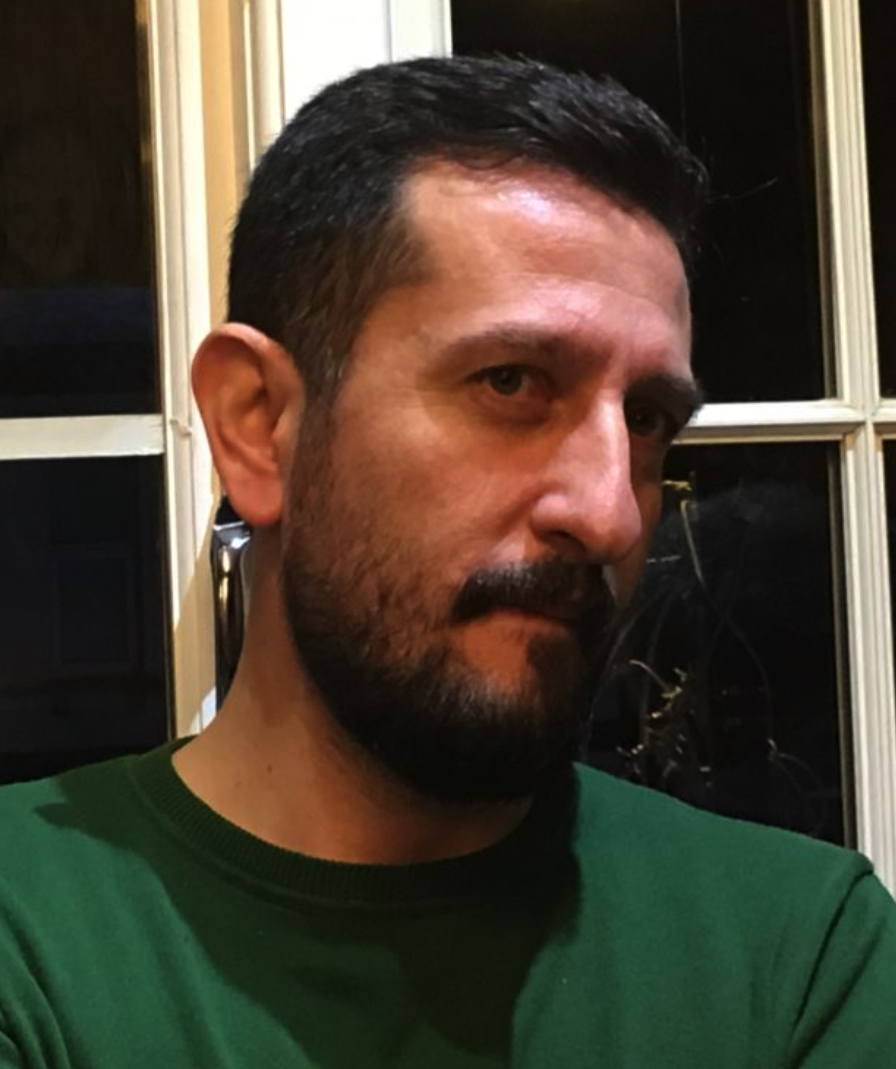

Member of the Grand National Assembly
- Incumbent
- Assumed office 7 June 2015
- Constituency: Ankara (I) (Jun 2015, Nov 2015)

Personal details
- Born: 27 December 1979 (age 46) Alaca, Çorum, Turkey
- Party: Republican People's Party
- Education: Marmara University
- Occupation: Lawyer, politician

Ali Haydar Hakverdi (born 27 December 1979) is a Turkish politician from the Republican People's Party (CHP) who currently serves as the Member of Parliament for Ankara's first electoral district since 7 June 2015. He was first elected in the June 2015 general election and was re-elected in the snap election of November 2015.

== Early life and career ==
Ali Haydar Hakverdi was born to Alevi parents in the district of Alaca, Çorum Province on 1 January 1979 and has lived in the capital city of Ankara since 1985. He graduated from Marmara University Faculty of Law and served as a freelance lawyer for fifteen years. Married with one child, he has since served as the General Secretary of Çorum-Der (The Çorum Foundation), as an executive of the Contemporary Life Support Association and as a headquarters executive of the Contemporary Jurists Association.

== Political career ==
Hakverdi became a member of the Republican People's Party (CHP) and served as the vice president of the party's district branch in Mamak, Ankara Province. He has also participated in the training of party officials and helped on briefing volunteer observers during elections. He was elected during a nomination primary to the CHP's candidate lists for Ankara's first electoral district and secured sixth place on the preference list. He was elected to the Grand National Assembly of Turkey in the June 2015 general election. He received nationwide news coverage for raising his fist while giving his oath of office during the parliamentary swearing in ceremony. He was re-elected as an MP in the snap election of November 2015.

== See also ==
- 25th Parliament of Turkey
- 26th Parliament of Turkey
