= Aşağıkamışlı, Elmadağ =

Aşağıkamışlı
- Neighbourhood
- Location in Turkey Aşağıkamışlı (Turkey Central Anatolia)
- Coordinates: 39.7529°N 33.2296°E
- Country: Turkey
- Province: Ankara
- District: Elmadağ
- Population (2022): 167
- Time zone: UTC+3 (TRT)

Aşağıkamışlı is a neighbourhood in the municipality and district of Elmadağ, Ankara Province, Turkey. Its population is 167 (2022).
