= Yurt Atayün =

- Citizenship: Turkey
- Occupation: Police chief
- Known for: Istanbul Counter-Terrorism Branch
- Office: Head of the Istanbul Counter-Terrorism Branch

Yurt Atayün is a former Turkish police chief. He served as head of the Counter-Terrorism Branch of the Istanbul Police Department. During his tenure, he was involved in operations related to the Ergenekon and Sledgehammer investigations. His name came to public attention in connection with the 7 February 2012 MIT incident. He was arrested in 2014 and subsequently tried in several cases.

== Career ==
Atayün served as head of the Counter-Terrorism Branch of the Istanbul Police Department. In 2012, he was removed from his position and was replaced by Ömer Köse.

Atayün's involvement in various operations related to the Ergenekon and Balyoz investigations was reported in the Turkish media. In 2008, he attended a briefing on the Ergenekon investigation at the U.S. Embassy in Ankara. Some military officers also filed complaints against Atayün and other police officers in connection with the Zirve Publishing House case.

Atayün also took part in procedures concerning documents and evidence in the Ergenekon and Balyoz investigations. These included the copying of DVD No. 51, which was used as evidence in the Ergenekon case, gathering information about the Turkish Youth Union, and sending a letter to the prosecutor's office concerning Hanefi Avcı's book Haliç'te Yaşayan Simonlar. He was also reported to have been involved in an investigation concerning documents submitted to prosecutors by Mehmet Baransu.

== 7 February 2012 MIT incident ==
In 2014, Atayün gave a statement concerning the MIT investigation of 7 February 2012. According to his lawyers, Atayün stated that several officials, including then-Prime Minister Recep Tayyip Erdoğan, had been aware of certain stages of an investigation into an alleged MIT structure within the Kurdistan Communities Union. His lawyers also stated that Atayün said a briefing concerning the investigation had been given to the Prime Minister.

== Arrest ==
Atayün was detained in July 2014 as part of an investigation in Istanbul and was arrested on 29 July 2014.

== Tahşiyeciler case ==
Atayün was tried as a defendant in a case concerning the operation against the Tahşiyeciler group. In 2017, the Istanbul 14th High Criminal Court sentenced Atayün to a total of 25 years and 6 months in prison: 12 years for membership in an armed terrorist organization, 4 years and 6 months for slander, and 9 years for forgery of official documents.

== VIP wiretapping case ==
Atayün was also tried as a defendant in the VIP wiretapping case concerning the alleged unlawful wiretapping of politicians, journalists, artists and businesspeople. In 2020, the Ankara 4th High Criminal Court sentenced Atayün to 7 years and 6 months in prison for forgery of official documents.

== 7 February MIT case ==
Atayün was also tried in connection with the investigation that resulted in MIT Undersecretary Hakan Fidan and several MIT officials being summoned for questioning on 7 February 2012.

On 3 March 2021, the Istanbul 23rd High Criminal Court sentenced ten defendants, including Atayün, to aggravated life imprisonment for attempting to overthrow or prevent the functioning of the Government of the Republic of Turkey. The court also sentenced Atayün and several other defendants to nine years in prison for aggravated forgery of official documents.

The court's reasoned decision described the investigation of 7 February 2012 as an operation directed against the government.

== Assassination allegation ==
Following Atayün's arrest, allegations emerged that he could be assassinated in prison. His lawyer, Cemalettin Mutlu, claimed that Atayün could be targeted because of information he possessed. The allegations were reported in the Turkish media.
