= Evren, Ankara =

Evren
- District and municipality
- Map showing Evren District in Ankara Province

- Location within Turkey Location within Turkey Central Anatolia
- Coordinates: 39°01′N 33°48′E
- Country: Turkey
- Province: Ankara

Government
  - Mayor: Hüsamettin Ünsal (AKP)
- Area: 369 km^{2} (142 sq mi)
- Elevation: 887 m (2,910 ft)
- Population (2022): 40,625
  - Density: 110/km^{2} (285/sq mi)
- Time zone: UTC+3 (TRT)
- Area code: 0312
- Website: www.evren.bel.tr

Evren, formerly Çıkınağıl, is a municipality and district of Ankara Province, Turkey. Its area is 369 km^{2}, and its population is 40,625 (2022). It is 178 km from the city of Ankara. Its elevation is 887 m.

== Name ==
This small remote town on the banks of Hirfanlı reservoir, was formerly known as Çıkınağıl, and was renamed after Kenan Evren, former president of Turkey. In November 2019, Ak Party proposed renaming the city back to Çıkınağıl.

== Composition ==
There are 13 neighbourhoods in Evren District:

- Altınbaşak
- Çatalpınar
- Cebirli
- Demirayak
- Esentepe
- Eskitorunobası
- İbrahimbeyli
- İnebeyli
- Modern
- Şerafettin Yılmaz
- Solakuşağı
- Yeni
- Yusufuşağı
