= Erkan Haberal =

Turkish politician

Member of the Grand National Assembly
- In office 17 November 2015 – 3 June 2023
- Constituency: Ankara (I) (Nov 2015); Ankara (III) (2018)

Personal details
- Born: August 23, 1972 (age 54) Pazar, Rize
- Party: Nationalist Movement Party
- Relations: Mehmet Haberal (father)
- Children: 2
- Education: Anadolu University

Erkan Bülent Haberal (August 23, 1972, Pazar, Turkey) is a Turkish politician.

== Biography ==
He graduated from Anadolu University, Faculty of Economics and Administrative Sciences, Department of Public Administration. He has a master's degree in Health Institutions Management. He was a member of the Ankara Chamber of Commerce Assembly, a member of the Medical Device Dealers and Private Hospitals Committee, Vice President of the Anatolian Tourism Operators Association, a member of the board of trustees of the Haberal Education Foundation, vice chairman of the board of directors of Kanal B TV, and a member of the board of directors of Çaykur Rizespor between 2002 and 2004.

On March 21, 2015, he was elected as a member of the Central Executive Committee (MYK) for the third time at the 11th Ordinary General Assembly of the Nationalist Movement Party. He is a deputy of Ankara for the 26th and 27th terms of the Grand National Assembly of Turkey. He served as the Administrative Chief of the 26th term of the Grand National Assembly of Turkey. He lost his seat in 2023 general election.

He is the son of Prof. Dr. Mehmet Haberal, 24th term CHP Zonguldak deputy of the Grand National Assembly of Turkey. He is married and has 2 children.
