= Elmadağ, Ankara =

Elmadağ
- District and municipality
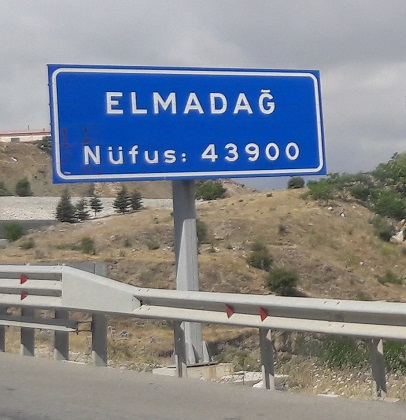

- Logo

- Map showing Elmadağ District in Ankara Province

- Location within Turkey Location within Turkey Central Anatolia
- Coordinates: 39°55′15″N 33°13′51″E
- Country: Turkey
- Province: Ankara

Government
  - Mayor: Adem Barış Aşkın (CHP)
- Area: 647 km^{2} (250 sq mi)
- Elevation: 1,135 m (3,724 ft)
- Population (2022): 44,379
  - Density: 68.6/km^{2} (178/sq mi)
- Time zone: UTC+3 (TRT)
- Postal code: 06780
- Area code: 0312
- Website: www.elmadag.bel.tr

Elmadağ is a municipality and district of Ankara Province, Turkey. Its area is 647 km^{2}, and its population is 44,379 (2022). Its average elevation is 1,135 m (3,724 ft), with the highest point being Mt. İdris at 1,995 m (6,545 ft).

== Places of interest ==
Elmadağ (1,862 m.) is also a small mountain beside the town, 45 km from the city of Ankara on the road to Kırıkkale.

== Composition ==
There are 30 neighbourhoods in Elmadağ District:

- Akçaali
- Aşağıkamışlı
- Deliler
- Ediğe
- Gümüşpala
- Hasanoğlan Bahçelievler
- Hasanoğlan Fatih
- Hasanoğlan Havuzbaşı
- İsmetpaşa
- İstasyon
- Karacahasan
- Kayadibi
- Kemalpaşa
- Kurtuluş
- Kuşçuali
- Lalabel
- Muzaffer Ekşi
- Şehitlik
- Seyitcemali
- Süleymanlı
- Taburlar
- Tatlıca
- Tekkeköy
- Üçevler
- Yenice
- Yenidoğan
- Yenimahalle
- Yenipınar
- Yeşildere Fatih
- Yukarıkamışlı
