= Ankara (2nd electoral district) =

Electoral district for the Grand National Assembly of Turkey

Coordinates: 40°12′09″N 32°40′49″E

Ankara (II)
- electoral district for the Grand National Assembly of Turkey
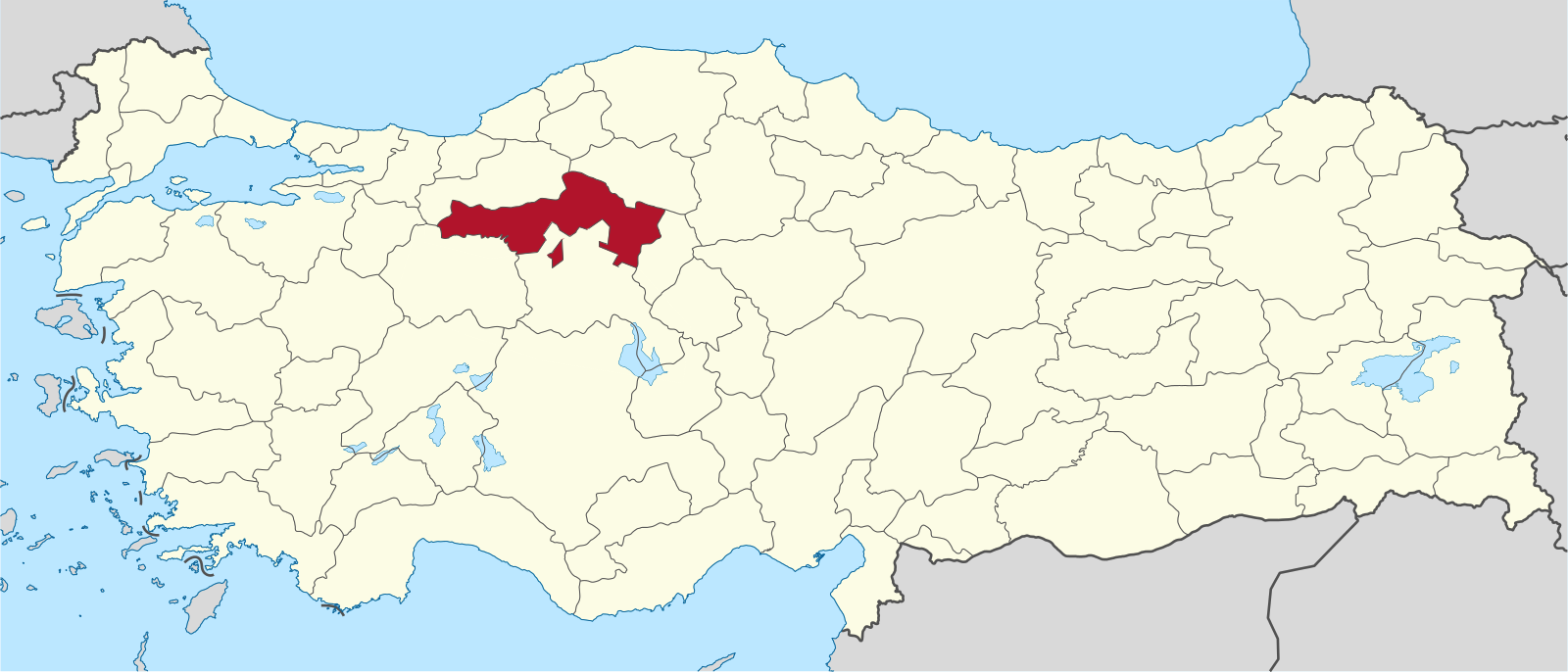
- Ankara (II) shown within Turkey
- Province: Ankara
- Electorate: 1,634,250

Current electoral district
- Created: 1923
- Seats: 15 Historical: 15 (2011) 14 (2002–2007)
- Parent district: Ankara
- Turnout at last election: 89.38%
- Representation
- AK Party: 9 / 15
- CHP: 4 / 15
- MHP: 2 / 15

Ankara's second electoral district is one of three divisions of Ankara province for the purpose of elections to Grand National Assembly of Turkey. It elects fifteen members of parliament (deputies) to represent the district for a four-year term by the D'Hondt method, a party-list proportional representation system.

== Division ==
The first electoral district contains the following Ankara administrative districts (ilçe):

- Altındağ
- Ayaş
- Beypazarı
- Çamlıdere
- Çubuk
- Güdül
- Kalecik
- Kahramankazan
- Keçiören
- Kızılcahamam
- Nallıhan
- Pursaklar
- Yenimahalle

== Members ==
Population reviews of each electoral district are conducted before each general election, which can lead to certain districts being granted a smaller or greater number of parliamentary seats. Ankara's second district elected 14 MPs in 2002 and 2007. In 2011, this number increased to 15.

MPs for Ankara (II), 2002 onwards
Election	2002 (22nd Parliament)	2007 (23rd Parliament)	2011 (24th Parliament)	June 2015 (25th Parliament)
MP	Salih Kapusuz; AK Party			
MP	Eyyüp Sanay; AK Party	Aşkın Asan; AK Party	Cemil Çiçek; AK Party	
MP	Mustafa Said Yazicioğlu; AK Party		Nurdan Şanlı; AK Party	
MP	Beşir Atalay; AK Party		Cevdet Erdöl; AK Party	
MP	Reha Denemeç; AK Party		Zelkif Kazdal; AK Party	
MP	Haluk İpek; AK Party			
MP	Telat Karapinar; AK Party	Mehmet Zafer Çağlayan; AK Party	Emrullah İşler; AK Party	
MP	Nur Doğan Topaloğlu; AK Party	Ahmet İyimaya; AK Party		
MP	Mustafa Tuna; AK Party	Yılmaz Ateş; CHP	Seyit Sertçelik; AK Party	
MP	Bayram Ali Meral; CHP	Tekin Bingöl; CHP	Ayşe Gülsün Bilgehan; CHP	
MP	Yakup Kepenek; CHP	Mücahit Pehlivan; CHP	İzzet Çetin; CHP	
MP	Zekeriya Akinci; CHP		Sinan Aygün; CHP	
MP	İsmet Çanakçi; CHP	Mustafa Cihan Paçacı; MHP	Gökhan Günaydın; CHP	
MP	Muzaffer Kurtulmuşoğlu; CHP	Ahmet Deniz Bölükbaşı; MHP	Mustafa Erdem; MHP	
MP	No seat		Özcan Yeniçeri; MHP	No seat

== General elections ==
=== June 2015 ===
June 2015 general election: Ankara (II)
Party	Candidate	Votes	%	±%
AK Party	8 elected: 1. Emrullah İşler ✓; 2. Ahmet İyimaya ✓; 3. Lütfiye Selva Çam ✓; 4. Vedat Bilgin ✓; 5. Aydın Ünal ✓; 6. Ayhan Yılmaz ✓; 7. Mahmut Sami Mallı ✓; 8. Nevzat Ceylan ✓; 9. Ahmet Baba ✗; 10. Nuri Elibol ✗; 11. Adem Ceylan ✗; 12. Selim Cerrah ✗; 13. Bülent Yağmur ✗; 14. Neslihan Cenk ✗	683,592	47.49	▼6.52
CHP	4 elected: 1. Şenal Sarıhan ✓; 2. Murat Emir ✓; 3. Ahmet Haluk Koç ✓; 4. Nihat Yeşil ✓; 5. Ali Rıza Erbay ✗; 6. Celalettin Koç ✗; 7. Semra Dinçer ✗; 8. Barış Ozan Vural ✗; 9. Ali Yılmaz ✗; 10. Servet Ünsal ✗; 11. Selma Ergen ✗; 12. Haydar Doğan ✗; 13. Abidin Şahin ✗; 14. Ufuk Ataç ✗	346,068	24.04	▼2.67
MHP	2 elected: 1. Şefkat Çetin ✓; 2. Mustafa Mit ✓; 3. Hamit Ayanoğlu ✗; 4. Yaşar Yıldırım ✗; 5. Mehmet Damar ✗; 6. Gül Gülser Kılıçarslan ✗; 7. Mehmet Ali Tanrıverdi ✗; 8. Alparslan Sucu ✗; 9. Tayfun Ünal ✗; 10. Meltem Hatice Uluç ✗; 11. Hikmet Durğut ✗; 12. Tümer Zeytin ✗; 13. Fatih Gözüm ✗; 14. Bayramali Temizer ✗	252,172	17.52	▲3.09
HDP	None elected: 1. Mahmut Memduh Uyan ✗; 2. Gülsen Ülker ✗; 3. Aydın Çubukçu ✗; 4. Nursel Öztürk ✗; 5. Remziye Güçlü ✗; 6. Ayfer Balıkcı ✗; 7. İlknur Yılmaz ✗; 8. Kamber Ataş ✗; 9. Mehtap Özkan Deliduman ✗; 10. Orhan Çelebi ✗; 11. Münübe Koç ✗; 12. Gülüstan Aydoğdu ✗; 13. Şerif Oti ✗; 14. Dilek Ertürk ✗	62,621	4.35	▲4.35
Independent	None elected: Abdulkadir Yılmaz Faruk Nesimi Gözübüyük Gökmen Gürkan Mehmet Sedat Fırat Taner Pehlivan Yurt Atayün ✗	42,760	2.97	▲2.19
SAADET	None elected: 1. Mustafa Destici ✗; 2. Selahattin Şenliler ✗; 3. İlyas Tongüç ✗; 4. Hayrettin Çal ✗; 5. Mustafa Yılmaz ✗; 6. Ömer Eren ✗; 7. Fatih Beyazıt ✗; 8. Gökhan Tezcan ✗; 9. Murat Kılıç ✗; 10. Ayla Şan ✗; 11. Burhan Gümrükçü ✗; 12. Yılmaz Yarar ✗; 13. Yener Kılıç ✗; 14. Mahmut Demir ✗	29,234	2.03	▲0.06
Patriotic	None elected: 1. Şule Erol ✗; 2. Serhan Bolluk ✗; 3. Erten Acır ✗; 4. Sami Özdil ✗; 5. Dilek Paksoy ✗; 6. Zeynep Tulin Sağlamtunç ✗; 7. Şen Yazgan ✗; 8. Haluk Solak ✗; 9. Ercan Enç ✗; 10. Cezmi Naci Eren ✗; 11. Meliha Ünlü ✗; 12. Murat Ali Sakal ✗; 13. Müzeyyen Akçın ✗; 14. Mehmet Varol ✗	5,036	0.35	▲0.35
BTP	None elected: 1. Abdullah Terzi ✗; 2. Nuri Kaplan ✗; 3. Önder Çolak ✗; 4. Harun Göksel ✗; 5. Ahmet Burak Güven ✗; 6. Mine Sıdıka Kermalli ✗; 7. Ömer Ender Özçelik ✗; 8. Bayram Güzel ✗; 9. İlhan Gültekin ✗; 10. Aşur Özer ✗; 11. Sermin Sözünden Dönmez ✗; 12. Adem Özhan ✗; 13. Salih Türkay ✗; 14. Ünal Tunçay ✗	4,174	0.29	▲0.29
TURK Party	None elected: 1. Seda Kılıç ✗; 2. Gülseren Bozkurt ✗; 3. Sinan Ülger ✗; 4. Turan Kutlu ✗; 5. Berat Öztürk ✗; 6. Arzu Uras ✗; 7. Emine Karadoğan ✗; 8. İzzet Acıelma ✗; 9. Mine Candar ✗; 10. İbrahim Akhun ✗; 11. Hatice Demir ✗; 12. Halittin Çolak ✗; 13. Zeynep Pınar Başer ✗; 14. Musa Çildam ✗	2,796	0.19	▲0.19
DSP	None elected: 1. Müzeyyen Okur ✗; 2. Hikmet Aydemir ✗; 3. Mustafa Naci Sarıbaş ✗; 4. Günay Alçığır ✗; 5. Nursel Kızılırmak ✗; 6. Mustafa Ağar ✗; 7. Sezai Demirkaya ✗; 8. Ali İnce ✗; 9. Hacı Kemal Koçer ✗; 10. Gökhan Çoşkun ✗; 11. Emin Demir ✗; 12. Fatma Jülide Sevüktekin ✗; 13. Mehmet Önder ✗; 14. Dilek Yazıcılar ✗	2,417	0.17	▲0.02
YP	None elected: 1. Yusuf Yavuz Tavşan ✗; 2. Suat Güler ✗; 3. Fatma Nedret Sağlam ✗; 4. Sönmez Dervişoğlu ✗; 5. Ayhan Yürekli ✗; 6. Mehmet Akgün Bayram ✗; 7. Hikmet Akçuraya ✗; 8. Ertuğrul Karacan ✗; 9. Emine Nurdan Zeren ✗; 10. Muzaffer Taşkıran ✗; 11. İsmail Emre Özden ✗; 12. Mehmet Bayazit ✗; 13. Havva Aydın ✗; 14. Hamza Emiroğlu ✗	1,446	0.10	▲0.10
DP	None elected: 1. Nuri Efe ✗; 2. Selami Genel ✗; 3. Ali Kılıç ✗; 4. Nihat Yılmaz ✗; 5. Fikret Çatmakaş ✗; 6. Yaşar Karataş ✗; 7. Dilek Nezihe Ocak ✗; 8. Mehmet Cahit Karakuş ✗; 9. Sıtkı Taner Koç ✗; 10. Mustafa Kaptan ✗; 11. Borahan Günalp ✗; 12. Ali Ulu ✗; 13. Aynur Barut ✗; 14. Adem Bölükbaş ✗	1,209	0.08	▼0.40
HAK-PAR	None elected: 1. Derviş Korkmaz ✗; 2. İbrahim Polat ✗; 3. Refik Karakoç ✗; 4. Hamdiye Şeşeoğulları ✗; 5. Gülsün Korucu ✗; 6. Mahmut Temel ✗; 7. Celal Deniz ✗; 8. Recai Gören ✗; 9. Engin Binici ✗; 10. Doğan Kaygalak ✗; 11. Fatma Yener ✗; 12. İlyas Güler ✗; 13. Dilek Döner ✗; 14. İbrahim Şener ✗	1,127	0.08	▲0.08
HKP	None elected: 1. Sultan Kıran ✗; 2. Metin Bayyar ✗; 3. Neşe Semerci ✗; 4. Ali Cemal Kar ✗; 5. Bayram Karkın ✗; 6. Mehmet Cihan Çakır ✗; 7. Ahmet Erdem ✗; 8. Seyfettin Baş ✗; 9. Bilsel Caner ✗; 10. Saadet Gürtan ✗; 11. Sıddıke Karaman ✗; 12. Sadık Eroğlu ✗; 13. İhsan Bozgun ✗; 14. Sadık Caner ✗	1,077	0.07	▲0.07
LDP	None elected: 1. Hüseyin Tüzün ✗; 2. Sonay Kale ✗; 3. Akın Ceceli ✗; 4. İsmail Bilaloğlu ✗; 5. Mehmet Kutlu Önbilgin ✗; 6. Yaşar Kalender ✗; 7. Orhan Gürel ✗; 8. İsmail Serdar Pehlivan ✗; 9. Hamdi Erdem ✗; 10. Fatma Başgül ✗; 11. Cüneyt Karataş ✗; 12. Kadir Kurt ✗; 13. Melek İlham Beyaz ✗; 14. Timuçin Onur Alpöz ✗	825	0.06	▲0.04
DYP	None elected: 1. Murat Çiçek ✗; 2. Halil İbrahim Öğünç ✗; 3. Yavuz Gülecek ✗; 4. Mehmet Vecdi Tamerol ✗; 5. Nalan Yılmaz ✗; 6. Zahide Şimşek ✗; 7. Sibel Kara ✗; 8. Kahin Gökce ✗; 9. Cemile Kıdık ✗; 10. Kamil Tosun ✗; 11. Serdar Arslan ✗; 12. Zeki Kaçar ✗; 13. Ercan Altınsoy ✗; 14. Müzeyyen Çiçek ✗	790	0.05	▼0.06
AnaParti	None elected: 1. İbrahim Vefa Tarhan ✗; 2. Sami Ağca ✗; 3. Uğraş Gök ✗; 4. Serap İdil ✗; 5. Mehmet Subaşı ✗; 6. Gülören Cangal ✗; 7. Mustafa Gençoğlu ✗; 8. Onur Dedeoğlu ✗; 9. Sema Baltacı ✗; 10. Dursun Ercan ✗; 11. Serkan Sezgin ✗; 12. Gürsel Erdinç ✗; 13. Burak Navruz ✗; 14. Özel Sülük ✗	681	0.05	▲0.05
MP	None elected: 1. Aykut Edibali ✗; 2. İsa Erdem ✗; 3. Mehmet Can ✗; 4. Yusuf Zaim ✗; 5. Süleyman Şen ✗; 6. İsmail Yiğit ✗; 7. Zekai Soysal ✗; 8. Seyit Ahmet Ereğiz ✗; 9. Ramazan Güzel ✗; 10. Azmi Tat ✗; 11. Abdullah Bilim ✗; 12. Hasan Hüseyin Kanbur ✗; 13. Şerife Fatma Demir ✗; 14. Mümtaz Ak ✗	501	0.03	▼0.11
Centre	None elected: 1. Ayşe Şeyda Açıkkol Altunok ✗; 2. Mehmet Değerli ✗; 3. Yaşar Asiler ✗; 4. Harun Gökhan ✗; 5. Ökeş Ömer Turkan ✗; 6. Semih Kavuştu ✗; 7. Merve Saruhan ✗; 8. Mustafa Metindoğan ✗; 9. Ali Rıza Eminoğlu ✗; 10. Münir Onur Berçin ✗; 11. Nevzat Bişirici ✗; 12. Yaşar Er ✗; 13. Cercis Demir ✗; 14. Metin Yücedağ ✗	454	0.03	▲0.03
Communist	None elected: 1. Nahide Özkan ✗; 2. Billur Oğuz ✗; 3. Alev Emniyetli ✗; 4. Yeter Yılmaz ✗; 5. Ayşe Deriner ✗; 6. Hatice Karayel ✗; 7. Fatma Üçpınar ✗; 8. Cansu Özbay ✗; 9. Müge Azizoğlu ✗; 10. Rahşan Nazlı Somel ✗; 11. Özge Aydemir Güney ✗; 12. Şilan Deniz Sümer ✗; 13. Sevinç Serpil Tatlı ✗; 14. Necla Aslan ✗	398	0.03	▲0.03
HAP	No candidates	19	0.00	▲0.00
Total votes		1,439,397		
Rejected ballots		29,330	2.00	▲0.67
Turnout		1,468,727	88.17	▼1.21

=== 2011 ===
2011 general election: Ankara (II)
Party	Candidate	Votes	%	±%
AK Party	9 elected ▲1: 1. Cemil Çiçek ✓; 2. Haluk İpek ✓; 3. Salih Kapusuz ✓; 4. Nurhan Şanlı ✓; 5. Ahmet İyimaya ✓; 6. Cevdet Erdöl ✓; 7. Zelkif Kazdal ✓; 8. Emrullah İşler ✓; 9. Seyit Sertçelik ✓; 10. Orhan Yegin ✗; 11. Nazlı Ergül ✗; 12. Cihan Ankara ✗; 13. Hüseyin Aydın ✗; 14. Çiğdem Orhan Sarıkaya ✗; 15. Murat Araç ✗	778,458	54.01	▲1.73
CHP	4 elected 0: 1. Ayşe Gülsün Bilgehan ✓; 2. İzzet Çetin ✓; 3. Sinan Aydın Aygün ✓; 4. Gökhan Günaydın ✓; 5. Seyhan Erdoğdu ✗; 6. Ekrem Kerem Oktay ✗; 7. Alper Taşdelen ✗; 8. Alirıza Erbay ✗; 9. Ali Arif Özzeybek ✗; 10. Onur Bayar ✗; 11. Hüseyin Çelebi Ercan ✗; 12. Turhan İçli ✗; 13. Aykut Fındıkçı ✗; 14. Faruk Yıldırım ✗; 15. Cenk Küpeli ✗	384,978	26.71	▲2.90
MHP	2 elected 0: 1. Ahmet Deniz Bölükbaşı ✓; 2. Mustafa Cihan Paçacı ✓; 3. Mustafa Erdem ✗; 4. Özcan Yeniçeri ✗; 5. Hamit Ayanoğlu ✗; 6. Ömer Demirel ✗; 7. Muharrem Beşir ✗; 8. Cemil Aydın ✗; 9. Figen Tosunor ✗; 10. Ali Zor ✗; 11. Hulusi Hakan Eren ✗; 12. Rahmi Yılmaz ✗; 13. Özgür Salman ✗; 14. Kerim İnal ✗; 15. İbrahim Köksal ✗	208,058	14.43	▼0.45
Büyük Birlik	None elected: 1. Mustafa Destici ✗; 2. Hasan Hüseyin Bozok ✗; 3. Serdar Akbaş ✗; 4. Yusuf Ayan ✗; 5. Ekrem Can ✗; 6. Muhittin Savaş Tunçyüz ✗; 7. Ferhat Günindi ✗; 8. Hayrettin Çal ✗; 9. İsa Kaplan ✗; 10. İmdat Dinçarslan ✗; 11. Ayşe Temiz ✗; 12. Mustafa Arslan ✗; 13. Mehmet Tekçe ✗; 14. İsmail Köksal ✗; 15. Seyfi Alpay ✗	17,573	1.22	▲1.22
HAS Party	None elected: 1. Hüsamettin Korkutata ✗; 2. Cafer Güneş ✗; 3. Erdinç Yazıcı ✗; 4. Nazım Maviş ✗; 5. Mehmet Rafi Kürüm ✗; 6. Havva Karademir ✗; 7. Süleyman Danacı ✗; 8. Elvan Altınbay ✗; 9. Banu Atabay ✗; 10. Yılmaz Çıtak ✗; 11. Özlem Uludağ Gülcan ✗; 12. Mehmet Bilal Bezci ✗; 13. Özgür Özdemir ✗; 14. Aydın Deniz Akdemir ✗; 15. Cenan Oran ✗	11,271	0.78	▲0.78
Independent	None elected: Sait Çömlekçi ✗ Sadrettin Güvener ✗ Aynur Bayram ✗ Erdoğan Karakuş ✗	11,252	0.78	▲0.08
SAADET	None elected: 1. İsmail İlhan Sungur ✗; 2. İlyas Tongüç ✗; 3. Ömer Günaydın ✗; 4. Nagihan Çıtak ✗; 5. Mustafa Güngör ✗; 6. Erol Öztürk ✗; 7. Reviyye Şahide Aygül ✗; 8. Mustafa Erkut Aşar ✗; 9. Ayhan Çelik ✗; 10. Burhan Gümrükçü ✗; 11. İbrahim Karayılan ✗; 12. Veysel Üzmez ✗; 13. Nureddin Kaya ✗; 14. Ömer İrez ✗; 15. Mehmet Sürer ✗	10,853	0.75	▼0.50
DP	None elected: 1. Ahmet Uyanık ✗; 2. Abdullah Terzi ✗; 3. Yusuf Fidantek ✗; 4. İzzet Yaşar ✗; 5. Hilmi Bilasa ✗; 6. İbrahim Yükselbaba ✗; 7. Ayşe Canyurt ✗; 8. Faruk Küçük ✗; 9. Selim Buğdaycı ✗; 10. Sebahat Demirci ✗; 11. Ali Osman Hacıhüseyinoğlu ✗; 12. Serdar Alp ✗; 13. Handan Akkocaoğlu ✗; 14. Çiğdem Küçükyılmaz ✗; 15. Halil Akçapınar ✗	6,850	0.48	▼2.41
HEPAR	None elected: 1. Kıral Ali Kılıç ✗; 2. Hilal Şahinoğlu ✗; 3. Cengiz Ayaz ✗; 4. Tuğba Sarıkaya ✗; 5. İlhan Ersay ✗; 6. Filiz Korkunç ✗; 7. Yücel Böke ✗; 8. Emin Türker ✗; 9. Müge Sirkecioğlu ✗; 10. Ceyhun Çanlı ✗; 11. Mehmet Tuğrul ✗; 12. Ali Ayaz ✗; 13. Sertkan Hakkı Kaşak ✗; 14. Gülsüm Göney ✗; 15. Adem Duran ✗	3,122	0.22	▲0.22
DSP	None elected: 1. Tufan Bural ✗; 2. Veli Arif Şimşek ✗; 3. Dilek Dengizek Ersanal ✗; 4. Dursun Tuncer Ertürk ✗; 5. Deniz Özgen ✗; 6. Hakan Koç ✗; 7. Cabar Sarıçam ✗; 8. Osman Çalışkan ✗; 9. Nursel Kızılırmak ✗; 10. Nüsret Adıbelli ✗; 11. Şerife Çitiloğlu ✗; 12. Melih Şengölge ✗; 13. Celal Saltaş ✗; 14. Ramazan Şanlı ✗; 15. İsmet Sarıkaya ✗	2,218	0.15	N/A
MP	None elected: 1. Zehra Erdem ✗; 2. Mehmet Can ✗; 3. Fatma Özdemir ✗; 4. Yusuf Elmalı ✗; 5. Metin Doğan ✗; 6. Ali Özdemir ✗; 7. Emine Erdem ✗; 8. Azmi Tat ✗; 9. Salih Ereğiz ✗; 10. Ali İsot ✗; 11. Hilmi Uçar ✗; 12. Sahir Güzel ✗; 13. Abdullah Bilim ✗; 14. Mustafa Demir ✗; 15. Mehmet Toptaş ✗	2,053	0.14	▲0.14
TKP	None elected: 1. Özcan Kaya Güvenç ✗; 2. Halim Apaydın ✗; 3. İlknur Sayın ✗; 4. Hüseyin Aslan ✗; 5. Sevim Sevgi Atar ✗; 6. Seher Yaşar ✗; 7. Volkan Coşkunyürek ✗; 8. Yusuf Şaylan ✗; 9. Ebru Ayaz ✗; 10. Nuray Özdoğan ✗; 11. Yunus Emre Durmuş ✗; 12. Hilmi Aydıner ✗; 13. Esma Çiçek ✗; 14. Suna Şimşek ✗; 15. Gamze Yılmaz ✗	1,840	0.13	▼0.06
DYP	None elected: 1. Hasan Fikret Türkel ✗; 2. Necati Aymayan ✗; 3. Yavuz Gülecek ✗; 4. Muhammet Adil Büyüksoy ✗; 5. Abdulselam Efe ✗; 6. Mecit Aslanlı ✗; 7. İsa Seylan ✗; 8. Mehmet Akman ✗; 9. Hüseyin Tolu ✗; 10. Abbas Karaağaç ✗; 11. İlker Demirciçeşmesi ✗; 12. Abdusselam Taştimur ✗; 13. Demet Çalışkan ✗; 14. Ayhan Deniz ✗; 15. Anıl Kıbriz ✗	1,542	0.11	▲0.11
Nationalist Conservative	None elected: 1. Ahmet Reyiz Yılmaz ✗; 2. Gülay Karabacak ✗; 3. Muhammet Altun ✗; 4. Hasan Mert ✗; 5. Özgür Ersan ✗; 6. Fikri Yılmaz ✗; 7. Osman Erdoğan ✗; 8. Yücel Çelik ✗; 9. Kemal İpek ✗; 10. Sebahattin Tolun ✗; 11. Seyhan Sungur ✗; 12. Esengül Akay ✗; 13. Nazire Evirgen ✗; 14. Nesrin Yıldırım ✗; 15. Murat Yıldırım ✗	951	0.07	▲0.07
Liberal Democrat	None elected: 1. Yavuz Kitapcı ✗; 2. Refik Sarıkaya ✗; 3. Orhan Gürel ✗; 4. Münir Albayrak ✗; 5. Kenan Özkiraz ✗; 6. Kadir Atalay ✗; 7. Ertan Tunca ✗; 8. Adem Özkara ✗; 9. Belkıs Çerkez ✗; 10. Umut Bogoçlu ✗; 11. Murat Şahingöz ✗; 12. Asım Sağlam ✗; 13. Murat Tari ✗; 14. Dilek Turhal ✗; 15. Melek İlham Beyaz ✗	339	0.02	▼0.04
Labour	No candidates	0	0.00	0.00
Total votes		1,441,358	100.00	
Rejected ballots		19,393	1.33	▼0.36
Turnout		1,460,751	89.38	▲2.82
AK Party hold Majority		393,480	27.30	▼1.17
