= Ankara (electoral districts) =

Electoral district for the Grand National Assembly of Turkey

- electoral district for the Grand National Assembly of Turkey
- Ankara shown within Turkey
- Province: Ankara
- Electorate: 3,904,585

Current electoral district
- Created: 1923
- Seats: 36 Historical: 32 (2017) 31 (2011) 29 (2002–2007)
- Subdistricts: 1st district 2nd district 3rd district
- Representation
- AK Party: 15 / 36
- CHP: 10 / 36
- MHP: 5 / 36
- İYİ: 5 / 36
- HDP: 1 / 36

Ankara is a Turkish province divided into three electoral districts of the Grand National Assembly of Turkey. It elects thirty-six members of parliament (deputies) to represent the province of the same name for a four-year term by the D'Hondt method, a party-list proportional representation system.

== Members ==
Population reviews of each electoral district are conducted before each general election, which can lead to certain districts being granted a smaller or greater number of parliamentary seats. Ankara is the second largest province in Turkey and saw an increase in its seat allocation ahead of the 2011 election to 31 members, with the first district electing 16 MPs while the second district electing 15 MPs per district.

The province's administrative districts (ilçe) are divided among two electoral districts as follows:

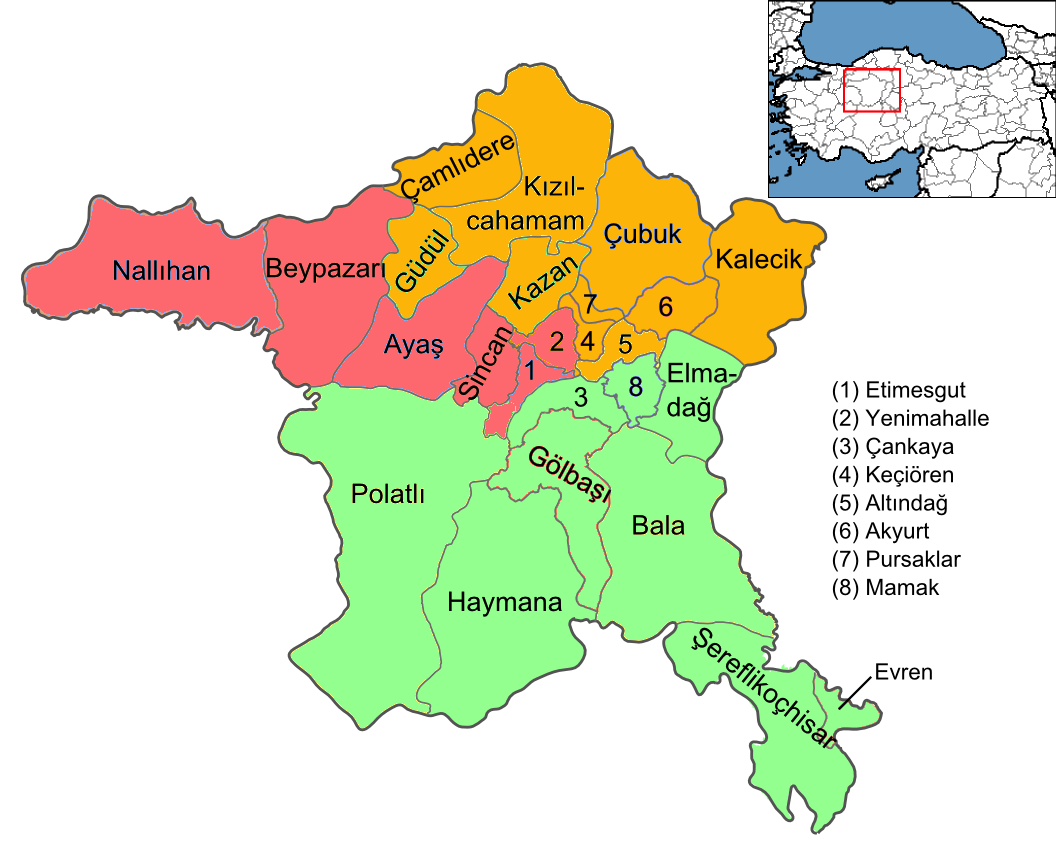
The three electoral districts of Ankara, 2017 boundaries First electoral district (13 MPs) Second electoral district (11 MPs) Third electoral district (12 MPs)

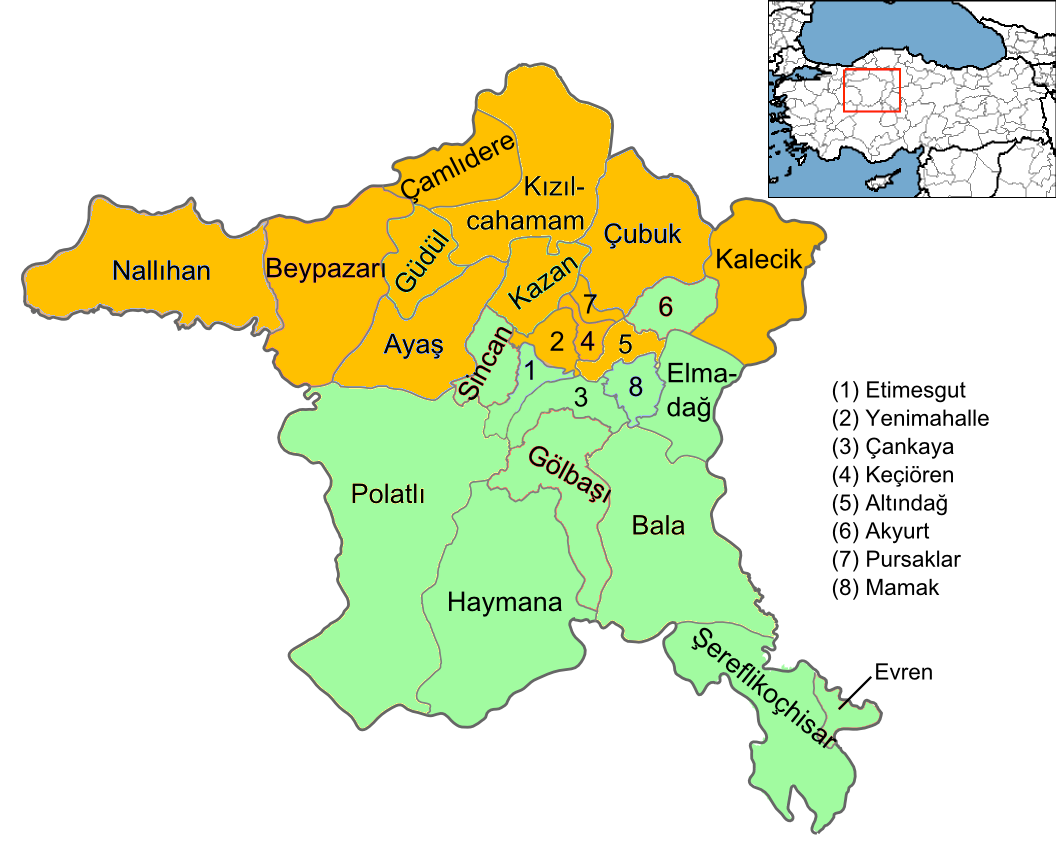
The two electoral districts of Ankara, 2015 boundaries First electoral district (18 MPs) Second electoral district (14 MPs)

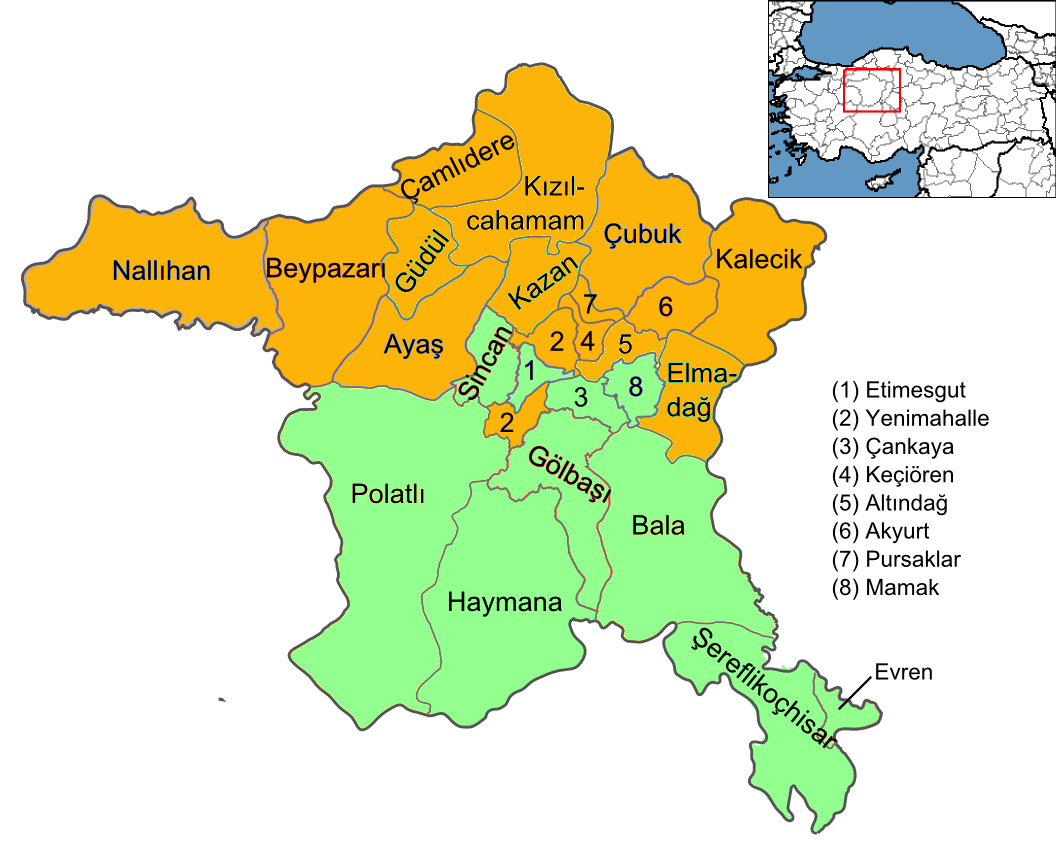
The two electoral districts of Ankara, 2011 boundaries First electoral district (16 MPs) Second electoral district (15 MPs)

2018–current
1st district	2nd district	3rd district
Bala; Çankaya; Elmadağ; Evren; Gölbaşı; Haymana; Mamak; Polatlı; Şereflikoçhisar	Akyurt; Altındağ; Çamlıdere; Çubuk; Güdül; Kahramankazan; Kalecik; Keçiören; Kızılcahamam; Pursaklar	Ayaş; Beypazarı; Etimesgut; Nallıhan; Sincan; Yenimahalle

Until 2018
1st district	2nd district
Akyurt; Bala; Çankaya; Elmadağ; Etimesgut; Evren; Gölbaşı; Haymana; Mamak; Polatlı; Sincan; Şereflikoçhisar	Altındağ; Ayaş; Beypazarı; Çamlıdere; Çubuk; Güdül; Kalecik; Kazan; Keçiören; Kızılcahamam; Nallıhan; Pursaklar; Yenimahalle

== General elections ==
=== 2011 ===
2011 general election: Ankara
Party	Candidates standing			Votes			Seats won			
Party	1st	2nd	Total	Number	%	swing	1st	2nd	Total elected	±
AK Party	16	15	31	1,466,446	49.24	▲1.73	8	9	17 / 31	▲1
CHP	16	15	31	935,688	31.30	▲3.34	6	4	10 / 31	▲1
MHP	16	15	31	436,883	14.62	▼0.54	2	2	4 / 31	0
BBP	16	15	31	33,162	1.11	▲1.11	0	0	0 / 31	0
Independents	6	4	10	29,852	1.00	▼0.25	0	0	0 / 31	0
HAS Party	16	15	31	22,310	0.75	▲0.75	0	0	0 / 31	0
Felicity	16	15	31	20,275	0.68	▼0.53	0	0	0 / 31	0
Democrat	16	15	31	13,023	0.44	▼2.40	0	0	0 / 31	0
HEPAR	15	16	31	6,710	0.22	▲0.22	0	0	0 / 31	0
Democratic Left	15	16	31	4,911	0.16	N/A	0	0	0 / 31	0
Communist	15	16	31	4,289	0.14	▼0.07	0	0	0 / 31	0
Nation	15	16	31	4,253	0.14	▲0.14	0	0	0 / 31	0
DYP	15	16	31	3,127	0.10	▲0.10	0	0	0 / 31	0
Nationalist Conservative	15	16	31	1,772	0.06	▲0.06	0	0	0 / 31	0
Liberal Democrat	15	16	31	920	0.03	▼0.03	0	0	0 / 31	0
Labour	0	0	0	0	0.00	0.00	0	0	0 / 31	0
Total				2,989,046	100.00	Steady	15	16	31	▲2
Rejected ballots				52,768	1.74	▲0.08				
Turnout				3,032,519	88.93	▲3.30				
AK Party hold Majority				536,183	18.04	▼1.51				

=== June 2015 ===
Abbr.	Party	Votes	%
AK Party	Justice and Development Party	1,320,517	41.2%
CHP	Republican People's Party	943,550	29.4%
MHP	Nationalist Movement Party	577,418	18%
HDP	Peoples' Democratic Party	167,654	5.2%
SP	Felicity Party	59,728	1.9%
VP	Patriotic Party	15,712	0.5%
	Other	119,932	3.7%
Total		3,204,511	
Turnout		86.53	
source: YSK

=== November 2015 ===
Abbr.	Party	Votes	%
AK Party	Justice and Development Party	1,618,972	48.8%
CHP	Republican People's Party	1,022,500	30.8%
MHP	Nationalist Movement Party	471,092	14.2%
HDP	Peoples' Democratic Party	134,449	4.1%
SP	Felicity Party	14,155	0.4%
VP	Patriotic Party	10,365	0.3%
	Other	46,293	1.4%
Total		3,317,826	
Turnout		88.63	
source: YSK

=== 2018 ===
Abbr.	Party	Votes	%
AK Party	Justice and Development Party	1,351,790	39.3%
CHP	Republican People's Party	899,730	26.2%
MHP	Nationalist Movement Party	447,397	13%
IYI	Good Party	421,747	12.3%
HDP	Peoples' Democratic Party	208,792	6.1%
SP	Felicity Party	51,734	1.5%
VP	Patriotic Party	7,364	0.2%
	Other	51,736	1.5%
Total		3,440,290	
Turnout		88.11	
source: YSK

== Presidential elections ==
=== 2014 ===
2014 presidential election: Ankara
Party	Candidate	Votes	%
AK Party	Recep Tayyip Erdoğan	1,405,856	51.31
Independent	Ekmeleddin İhsanoğlu	1,239,264	45.23
HDP	Selahattin Demirtaş	95,033	3.47
Total votes		2,740,153	100.00
Rejected ballots		45,155	1.62
Turnout		2,785,308	77.14
Recep Tayyip Erdoğan win			
