= Crystal Kelly Cup =

The Crystal Kelly Cup or Crystal Kelly Tournament (sometimes: Chrystal Kelly) was a prestigious, generously funded carom billiards invitational tournament in the discipline of three-cushion, which has been held at different venues from 1994 to 2011, a total of 18 times, mostly in Monte Carlo and Nice.

== History ==
The tournament was launched in 1994 by the businessman and software-founder of Volmac (since 1992 it belongs to the Cap Gemini Group), Joop van Oosterom, who is also a billiards and chess enthusiast. The tournament was named after his daughter Crystal Kelly van Oosterom, as well as for the Dutch Eredivisie club of "Crystal Kelly," which was also very successful. In 1992 Joop already dedicated Melody Amber, a blindfold and correspondence chess tournament, to his other daughter.

In 2010, Joop announced that he will give up the sponsorship the following year. Thus, the 2011-tournament was the last. Raymond Ceulemans, the three-cushion-legend form Belgium, was part of the tournament from the beginning on, from 1994 to 2006 as a player, in the early years he finished he still finished as a front runner, though he never could win the tournament. After his retirement from active billiards sports (2006) he was the tournament director. Torbjörn Blomdahl and Dick Jaspers participated in all 18 tournaments, in which the latter is eight times record winner of the tournament and Blomdahl was second with 5 wins.

It was carrying out 13 times in Monte Carlo, 3 times in Nice and one time in Scheveningen and Antwerp as of the end of the season in early June. The only exception was in 2005 when the tournament was held in late August.

The tournament was one of the best-paid - the prizes were ever tournament always around U.S. $70,000, there were extra bonuses for services paid and the winner took home about $20,000 - its kind, similar to the AGIPI Billiard Masters in Schiltigheim, France and it was considered as "The little World Championship". Among the players who called the tournament also "The Monaco", it had a high reputation and everyone gladly followed the invitation of van Oosterom. They were all, including their wives/partners, flown in and have been guests of the family van Oosterom for a week. There was just one game each day for everyone on the time table, and so there was a lot of time for trips and excursions.

Only participant from America was Sang Chun Lee from the USA .

== Tournament structure ==
The number of participants ranged between eight and ten players. A total of 17 different players in the tournament. Many players have been invited over the years, such as: Semih Saygıner (16 ×), Frédéric Caudron (15 ×), Frans van Kuijk (13 ×), Marco Zanetti (11 ×) and Daniel Sánchez (8 ×). In the last tournament in 2011 the ten participants were divided into two groups of five players each.

These were:

- Groupe A:
  - (Italy) Marco Zanetti
  - (Belgium) Frédéric Caudron
  - (Belgium) Eddy Merckx
  - (Netherlands) Frans van Kuijk
  - (Greece) Filippos Kasidokostas
- Groupe B:
  - (Netherlands) Dick Jaspers
  - (Sweden) Torbjörn Blomdahl
  - (Spain) Daniel Sánchez
  - (Turkey) Semih Saygıner
  - (Belgium) Peter Ceulemans

The first stage was played in the round-robin mode with equal innings. The final round was played in a knock-out mode as first to 50 points without equal innings. The places 3-10 were played out.

== Winners table ==
Legend
Code	Explanation
GA	General Average = all points ÷ all innings
SpA	Special Average = best average in a single game (points ÷ innings)
HR	Highest Run = longest series of caroms (within single game)

Statistic
No.	Year	Venue	1. Place	2. Place	3. Place	best GA	HR	Refs.
1	1994	(Monaco) Monte Carlo	(Netherlands) Dick Jaspers	(Sweden) Torbjörn Blomdahl	(Belgium) Ludo Dielis	1,840 • (Netherlands) Dick Jaspers	15 • (Netherlands) Dick Jaspers	
2	1995	(Monaco) Monte Carlo	(Sweden) Torbjörn Blomdahl^{[1]}	(Netherlands) Dick Jaspers	(Belgium) Raymond Ceulemans	2,324 • (Sweden) Torbjörn Blomdahl	13 • (United States) Sang Lee	
3	1996	(Monaco) Monte Carlo	(Sweden) Torbjörn Blomdahl	(Belgium) Raymond Ceulemans	(Netherlands) Dick Jaspers	2,160 • (Sweden) Torbjörn Blomdahl	15 • (Sweden) Torbjörn Blomdahl	
4	1997	(Monaco) Monte Carlo	(Sweden) Torbjörn Blomdahl	(Netherlands) Dick Jaspers	(Turkey) Semih Saygıner	1,977 • (Sweden) Torbjörn Blomdahl	15 • (Belgium) Raymond Ceulemans	
5	1998	(Monaco) Monte Carlo	(Belgium) Frédéric Caudron	(Netherlands) Dick Jaspers^{[2]}	(Sweden) Torbjörn Blomdahl	2,156 • (Sweden) Torbjörn Blomdahl	21 • (Netherlands) Dick Jaspers	
6	1999^{[3]}	(Monaco) Monte Carlo	(Netherlands) Dick Jaspers	(Sweden) Torbjörn Blomdahl	(Belgium) Frédéric Caudron	2,035 • (Netherlands) Dick Jaspers	15 • (Netherlands) Frans van Kuyk	
7	2000	(Monaco) Monte Carlo	(Sweden) Torbjörn Blomdahl	(Netherlands) Frans van Kuyk	(Belgium) Frédéric Caudron	1,800 • (Belgium) Frédéric Caudron	13 • (Sweden) Torbjörn Blomdahl	
8	2001	(Monaco) Monte Carlo	(Netherlands) Dick Jaspers	(Turkey) Semih Saygıner	(Denmark) Dion Nelin	1,832 • (Netherlands) Dick Jaspers	18 • (Denmark) Dion Nelin	
9	2002	(Monaco) Monte Carlo	(Netherlands) Dick Jaspers^{[4]}	(Belgium) Frédéric Caudron	(Turkey) Semih Saygıner	2,537 • (Netherlands) Dick Jaspers	19 • (Sweden) Torbjörn Blomdahl	
10	2003	(Netherlands) Scheveningen	(Netherlands) Dick Jaspers	(Belgium) Frédéric Caudron	(Sweden) Torbjörn Blomdahl	2,318 • (Netherlands) Dick Jaspers	18 • (Belgium) Raymond Ceulemans	
11	2004	(Monaco) Monte Carlo	(Netherlands) Dick Jaspers	(Spain) Daniel Sánchez	(Netherlands) Frans van Kuyk	2,258 • (Netherlands) Dick Jaspers	15 • (Netherlands) Dick Jaspers	
12	2005	(Monaco) Monte Carlo	(Netherlands) Dick Jaspers	(Sweden) Torbjörn Blomdahl	(Turkey) Semih Saygıner	2,013 • (Netherlands) Dick Jaspers	13 • (Sweden) Torbjörn Blomdahl	
13	2006	(Monaco) Monte Carlo	(Sweden) Torbjörn Blomdahl^{[5]}	(Netherlands) Dick Jaspers	(Belgium) Frédéric Caudron	2,289 • (Netherlands) Dick Jaspers	19 • (Belgium) Frédéric Caudron	
14	2007	(Monaco) Monte Carlo	(Netherlands) Dick Jaspers	(Spain) Daniel Sánchez	(Netherlands) Raimond Burgman	2,174 • (Netherlands) Dick Jaspers	13 • (Netherlands) Dick Jaspers	
15	2008	(Belgium) Antwerp	(Belgium) Frédéric Caudron	(Sweden) Torbjörn Blomdahl	(Netherlands) Dick Jaspers	1,983 • (Belgium) Eddy Merckx	21 • (Belgium) Frédéric Caudron	
16	2009^{[6]}	(France) Nice	(Belgium) Frédéric Caudron	(Sweden) Torbjörn Blomdahl	(Belgium) Eddy Merckx	2,126 • (Belgium) Frédéric Caudron	13 • (Belgium) Frédéric Caudron	
17	2010	(France) Nice	(Italy) Marco Zanetti	(Sweden) Torbjörn Blomdahl	(Netherlands) Dick Jaspers^{[7]}	2,472 • (Netherlands) Dick Jaspers	15 • (Belgium) Eddy Merckx	
18	2011	(France) Nice	(Greece) Filippos Kasidokostas	(Italy) Marco Zanetti	(Netherlands) Dick Jaspers	2,623 • (Netherlands) Dick Jaspers^{[8]}	15 • (Netherlands) Dick Jaspers	

Notes

- ^{1} Blomdahl plays the unofficial world record of a GA of 2,324 and a SpA of 3,571 (dito 1996).
- ^{2} Jaspers plays a SpA of 4,166.
- ^{3} R. Ceulemans plays a SpA of 3,846.
- ^{4} Jaspers plays a SpA of 5,000, 50 points in 10 innings.
- ^{5} Blomdahl plays a SpA of 3,846
- ^{6} In 2009 the best tournament average of 1,865 has been played.
- ^{7} Jaspers plays a SpA of 4,545.
- ^{8} Jaspers plays a record GA of 2,623, which is an unofficial record.

Eternal winner list
Name	No.	Years
(Netherlands) Dick Jaspers	8	1994, 1999, 2001–2005, 2007
(Sweden) Torbjörn Blomdahl	5	1995–1997, 2000, 2006
(Belgium) Frédéric Caudron	3	1998, 2008, 2009
(Italy) Marco Zanetti	1	2010
(Greece) Filippos Kasidokostas	1	2011

== Gallery of the 1999 Cup ==
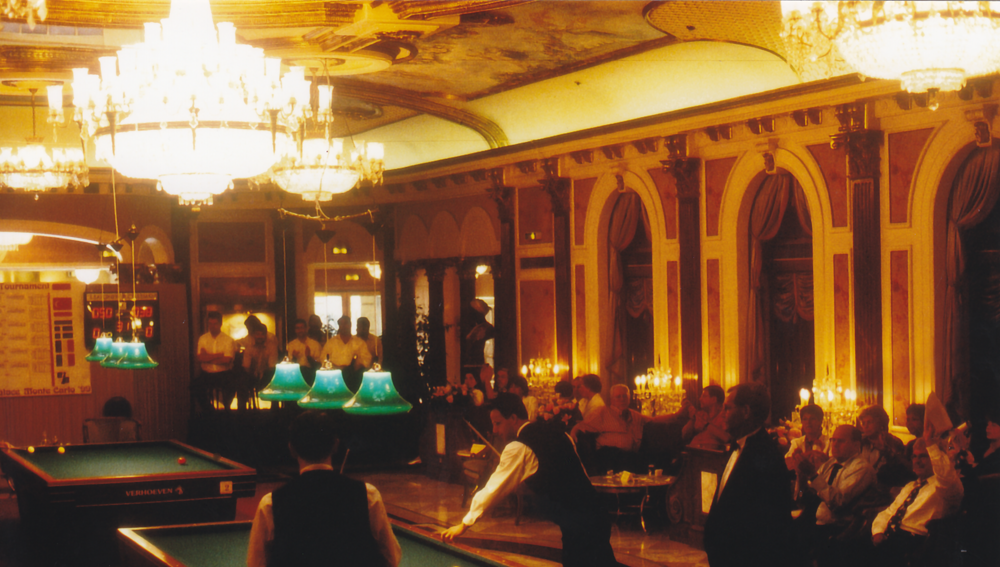

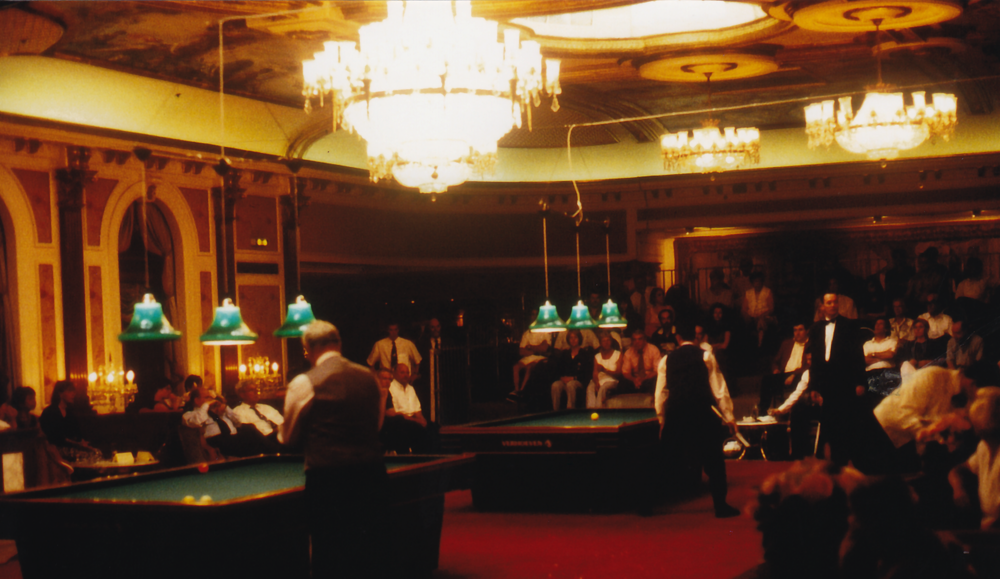

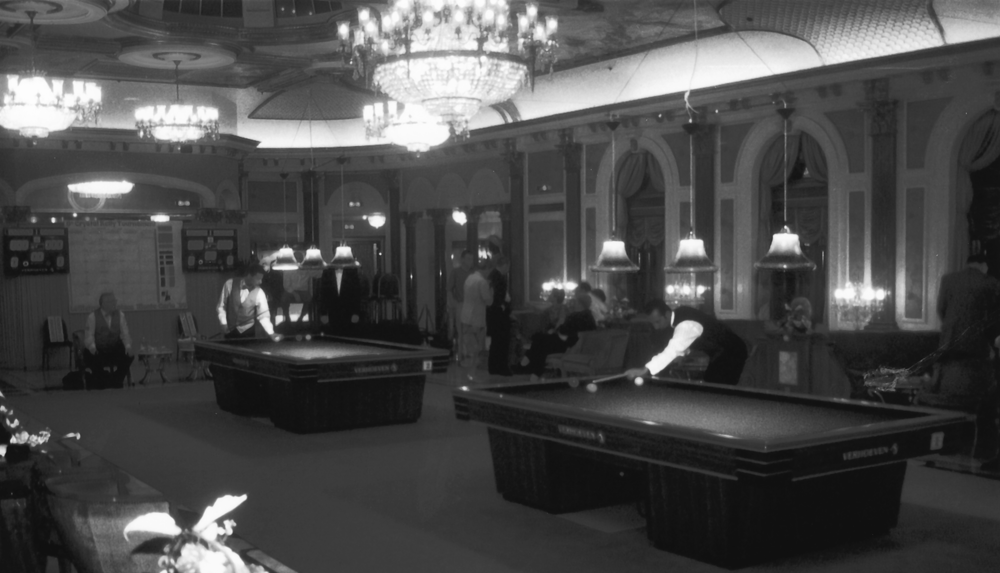

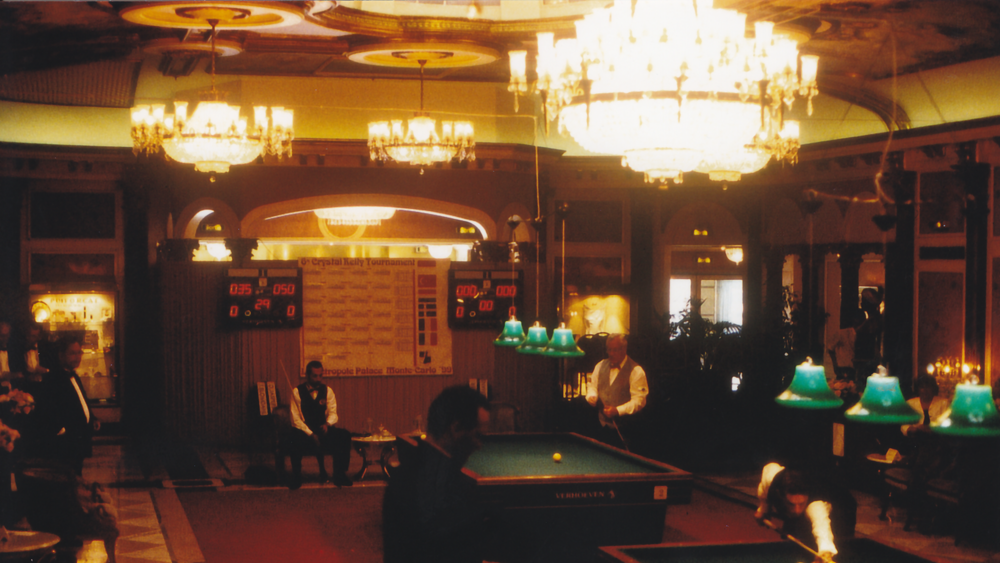

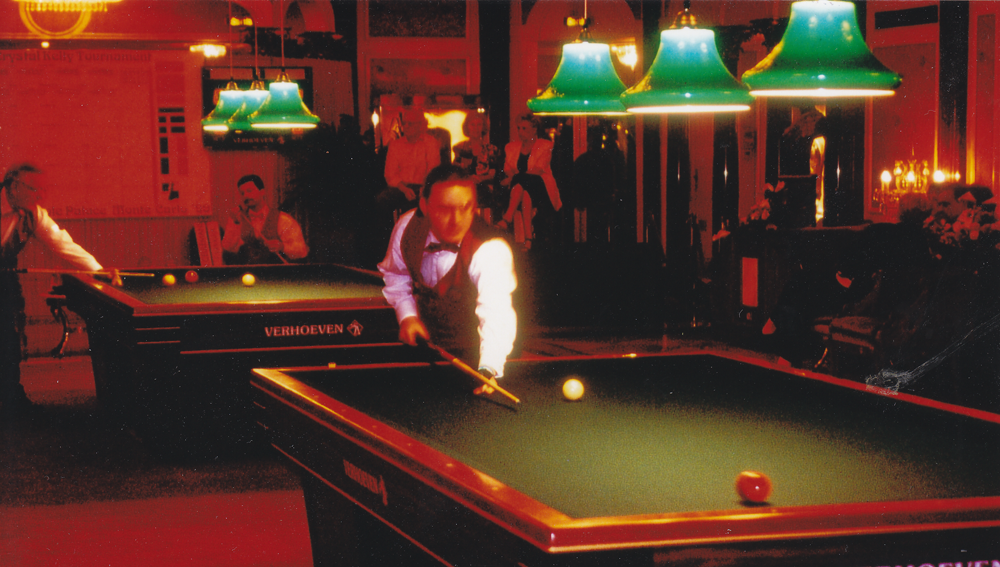
Frédéric Caudron

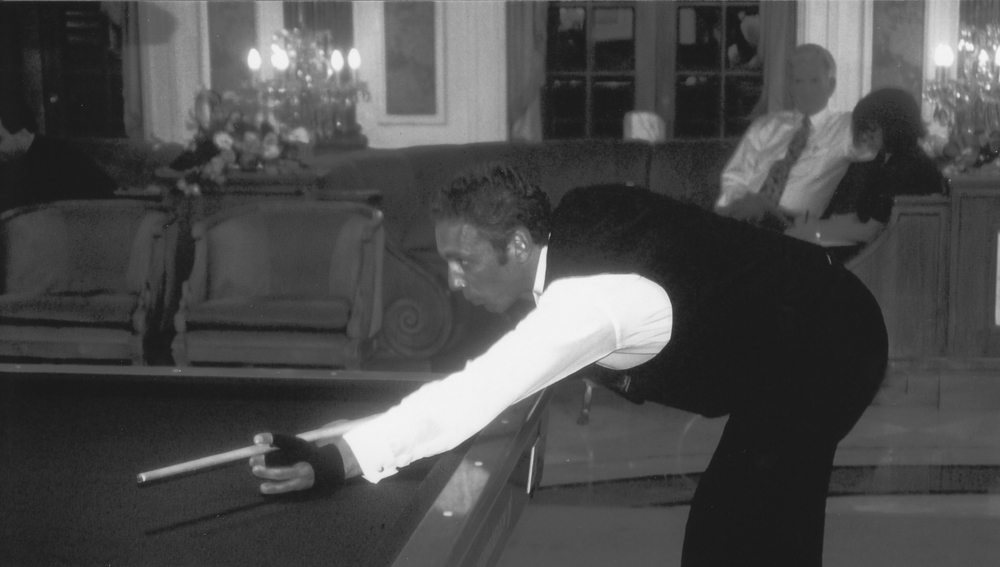
Marco Zanetti

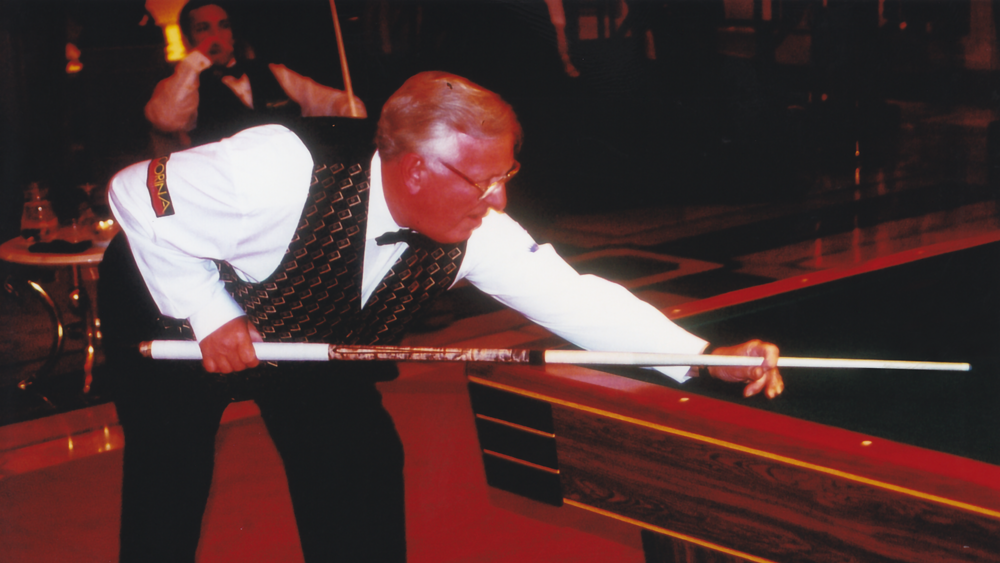
Raymond Ceulemans

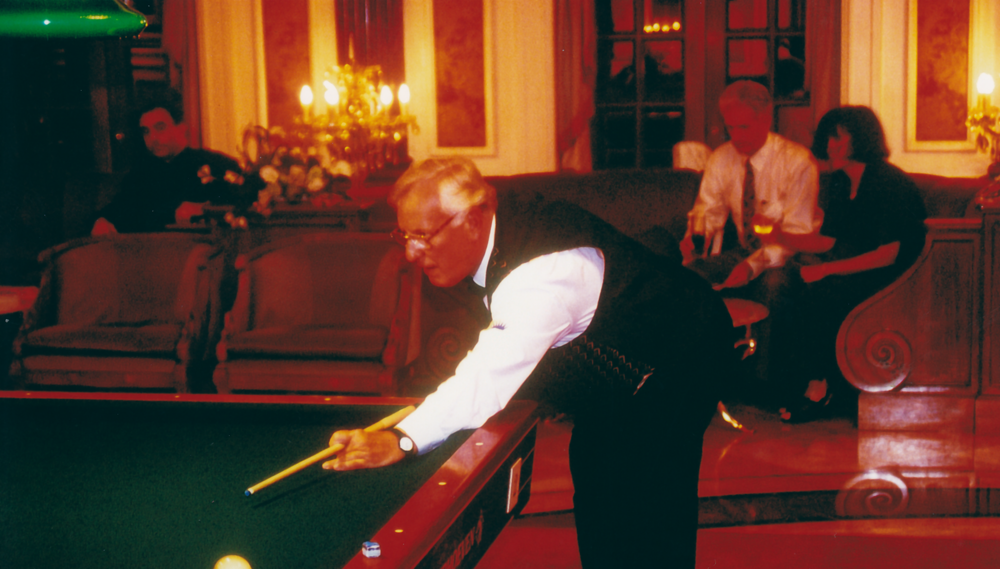
Raymond Ceulemans

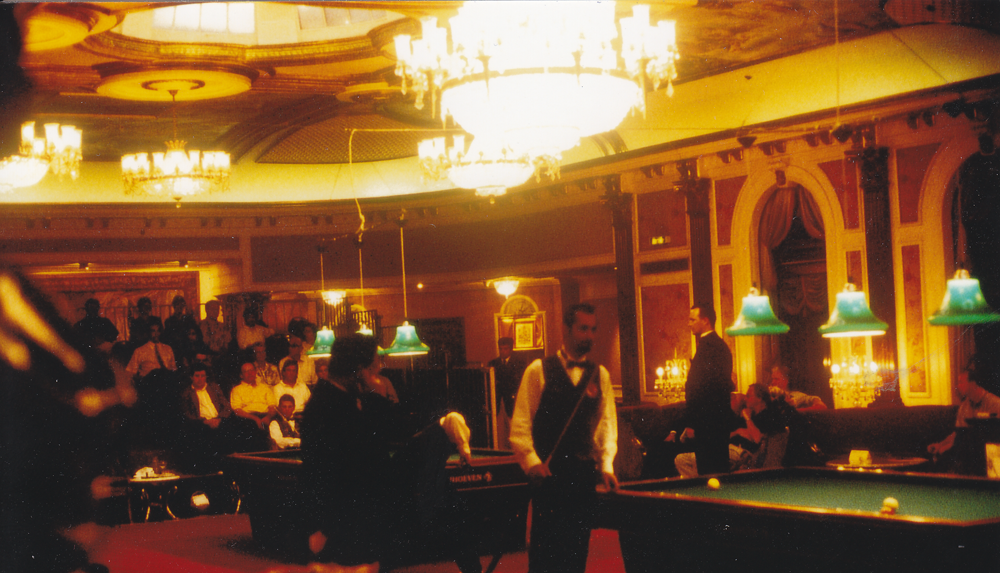
Semih Saygıner
