= Semih Saygıner =

Turkish billiards player (born 1964)

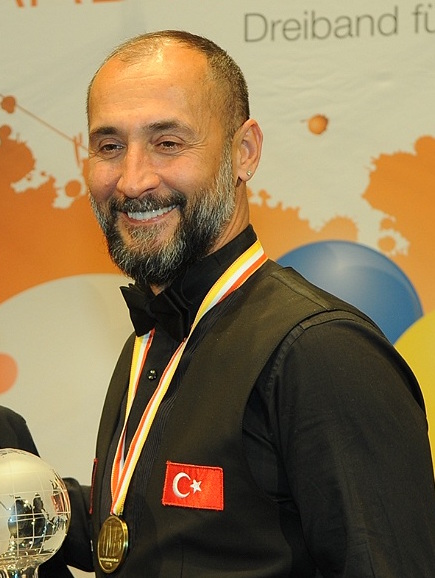
- Semih Saygıner at the 2018 3-cushion World Championship

Personal information
- Nickname: Mr. Magic
- Born: 12 November 1964 (age 61) Adapazarı, Turkey
- Website: http://www.semihsayginer.com.tr/

Pool career
- Country: Turkey

Medal record

Men's three-cushion billiards

Representing Turkey

UMB World Championship
Gold medal – first place	2003 Valladolid	Individual
Gold medal – first place	2003 Viersen	Team
Gold medal – first place	2004 Viersen	Team
Bronze medal – third place	2006 Viersen	Team
Bronze medal – third place	2016 Bordeaux	Individual
Silver medal – second place	2016 Viersen	Team
Bronze medal – third place	2018 Cairo	Individual
Bronze medal – third place	2018 Viersen	Team
Bronze medal – third place	2019 Randers	Individual
Gold medal – first place	2023 Viersen	Team

CEB European Championship
Gold medal – first place	1999 Porto	Individual
Silver medal – second place	2000 Madrid	Individual
Silver medal – second place	2006 Antalya	Individual

World Games
Bronze medal – third place	2005 Duisburg	Individual

Semih Saygıner (born 12 November 1964), nicknamed Mr. Magic or The Turkish Prince, is a Turkish world champion professional carom billiards player specialized in three-cushion event.

== Family life ==
Semih Saygıner was born to a tailor father Faruk and a homemaker mother Süreyya in Adapazarı, Turkey on November 12, 1964. He is the fifth of six siblings. His parents died due to a traffic accident in 1978 when he was 14 years old. Saygıner then started playing billiards. He had a good performance in high school but left for depression over the loss of his mother and father.

Saygıner opened up a billiards hall, and taught the cue sport. In 1995, he married Aygen Berk, a student of his, the women's billiards champion of Turkey and co-founder of the Turkish Billiards Federation. Their marriage ended a few years later.

From 1996 to 1997, he served as the president of the Turkish Billiards Federation.

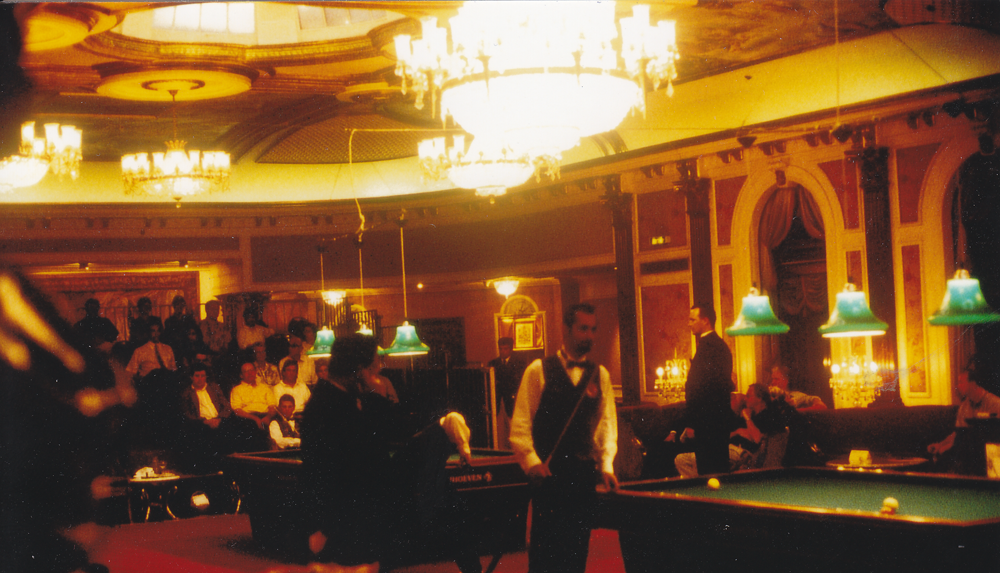
Semih Saygıner at the 1999 Crystal Kelly Cup in Monte Carlo, Monaco

== Career ==
He began playing billiards at age 16, and focused on the cue sport. A year later, he participated at Istanbul Championship, and won his first Turkish title. Ranking many years on the second place at national level, he finally became Turkish champion in 1987.

In 1991, he participated at German Open. The next year, he placed world eighth when he defeated world-champion Raymond Ceulemans by 3–0 in Berlin. In 1994, he transferred to the Netherlands Billiards Teams League, one of the most important leagues of billiards. Saygıner won the Three-cushion World Cup held 1998 in Antalya after defeating Dutchman Gerwin Walentijn in the final. Saygıner won the 1999 CEB European Three-cushion Championship by defeating Dion Nelin of Denmark. He nearly won it again the next year but lost to Daniel Sánchez. He was the first from his country to win that tournament. His countryman Murat Naci Çoklu won the title five years later.

In 2003, Saygıner won the UMB World Three-cushion Championship defeating of Filippos Kasidokostas of Greece. He is the only Turk ever to win the championship. That same year, he won the last World Three-cushion Championship organized by the Billiards World Cup Association (BWA) beating Dick Jaspers. He and his teammate Tayfun Taşdemir became world champion at the UMB World Three-cushion Championship for National Teams held 2003 in Viersen, Germany. Saygıner was named Best Billiards Player 2003 in Antwerp, Belgium on February 7, 2004.

Saygıner transferred to Portugal playing for FC Porto Billiards team. He captained the team for three years, and won the bronze medal at the 2004–05 European Three-cushion Cup with the team.

He is the 25-time winner of Turkish Grand Prix in total. He won the Turkish champion title 14 times in three-cushion. Furthermore, he has ten champion titles in carom billiards in Turkey, as well as one each in cadre 47/2 and one-cushion. In 2006, he ranked at 8th place of the world bests of Union Mondiale de Billard (UMB). His highest average in a match is 3.571 (50 points in 14 innings).

In 2009, Saygıner signed a contract with the cue-stick producer Longoni. Under the contract, a series of cue sticks that bear Saygıner's name has been available from the company.

Saygıner announced his retirement from active sports in 2006, continuing to participate only in some international competitions. His last international participation was in 2007. However, he made his comeback in 2015 by winning the Turkish championship again. Following the championship, he was named to take part in the Turkey national team.

== Achievements ==
1993

- (bronze) Three-Cushion World Cup Leg 3, Berlin, Germany

1994

- (gold) Three-Cushion World Cup Leg 7, Ghent, Belgium

1995

- (gold) Korea Three-cushion Open, Suwon, South Korea
- (gold) Mersin International Tournament, Mersin, Turkey

1996

- (gold) Mersin International Tournament, Mersin, Turkey
- (silver) Three-Cushion World Cup Leg 7, Antwerp, Belgium

1997

- (bronze) Crystal Kelly Cup, Monte Carlo, Monaco
- (bronze) Three-Cushion World Cup Leg 6, osterhout, Netherlands

1998

- (bronze) Three-Cushion World Cup Leg 3, Lisbon, Portugal
- (bronze) Three-Cushion World Cup Leg 6, Bogotá, Colombia
- (bronze) Three-Cushion World Cup Leg 7, Torremolinos, Spain
- (bronze) Three-Cushion World Cup Leg 8, Oosterhout, Netherlands
- (gold) Three-Cushion World Cup Leg 9, Antalya, Turkey
- (silver) Three-Cushion World Cup, Antwerp, Belgium
- (gold) Dutch International Tournament, Zundert, Netherlands

1999

- (bronze) Three-Cushion World Cup Leg 1, Seoul, South Korea
- (silver) Three-Cushion World Cup Leg 2, Las Vegas, USA
- (gold) USA Three-cushion Open, San Jose, California, USA
- (gold) Dutch Grand Prix, Barendrecht, Netherlands
- (gold) CEB European Three-cushion Championship, Porto, Portugal

2000

- (gold) Three-Cushion World Cup Leg 1, Bogotá, Colombia
- (silver) World Cup Series - Leg 5
- (gold) Denmark Three-cushion Open, Denmark
- (gold) USA Three-cushion Open, Boston, USA
- (gold) USA Three-cushion Open, Atlanta, USA
- (gold) Mexico Three-cushion Open, Mexico City, Mexico
- (gold) Metropol-Diamond Cup, Antwerp, Belgium
- (silver) CEB European Three-cushion Championship, Madrid, Spain
- (gold) Greece Three-cushion Open, Athens, Greece
- (gold) Japan Cup, Tokyo, Japan

2001

- (bronze) Three-Cushion World Cup Leg 3, Kuşadası, Turkey
- (bronze) Three-Cushion World Cup Leg 4, Lugo, Spain
- (silver) Three-Cushion World Cup Leg 5, Oosterhout, Netherlands
- (gold) Three-Cushion World Cup, Bogotá, Colombia
- (gold) Metropol-Diamond Cup, Antwerp, Belgium
- (silver) Crystal Kelly Cup, Monte Carlo, Monaco

2002

- (gold) European Team Championship (with Dutch team Van Wanrooij), Porto, Portugal
- (gold) Japan Cup, Tokyo, Japan
- (bronze) Crystal Kelly Cup, Monte Carlo, Monaco

2003

- (gold) Three-Cushion World Cup, Las Vegas, USA
- (gold) World Championship, Las Vegas, USA
- (gold) World Championship, Valladolid, Spain
- (gold) World National Teams Championship, Versen, Germany

2004

- (bronze) Three-Cushion World Cup Leg 1, Barendrecht, Netherlands
- (gold) Three-Cushion World Cup Leg 2, Athens, Greece
- (bronze) Three-Cushion World Cup Leg 3, Seville, Spain
- (silver) Three-Cushion World Cup Leg 3, Antwerp, Belgium
- (gold) World National Teams Championship, Versen, Germany
- (gold) Super Cup, Antwerp, Belgium

2005

- (bronze) Three-Cushion World Cup Leg 1, Sluiskil, Netherlands
- (bronze) Three-Cushion World Cup Leg 2, Hurghada, Egypt
- (bronze) European Teams Championship (with Portuguese team FC Porto Billiards), France
- (bronze) World Games, Duisburg, Germany
- (bronze) Crystal Kelly Cup, Monte Carlo, Monaco
- (silver) Sang Lee International Open, Flushing, New York, USA

2006

- (silver) Three-Cushion World Cup Leg 5, Istanbul, Turkey
- (silver) CEB European Three-cushion Championship, Antalya, Turkey
- (silver) UMB World Three-cushion Championship for National Teams, Vieersen, Germany
- (bronze) Sang Lee International Open, Flushing, New York, USA

2007

- (bronze) Three-Cushion World Cup Leg 2, Manisa, Turkey
- (silver) Three-Cushion World Cup Leg 3, Corfu, Greece
- (bronze) Sang Lee International Open, Flushing, New York, USA

2008

- Semi-finalist AGIPI Billiard Masters

2021

- (gold) Three-Cushion World Cup Leg 2, Sharm El Sheikh, Egypt

== Awards ==
- 1994 Olympic Torch Award, Istanbul, Turkey
- 2003 Sportsperson of the Year by newspaper Zaman, Istanbul, Turkey
- 2004 World's Best Three-cushion Player, Antwerp, Belgium
- 2004 Sportsperson of the Year by newspaper Milliyet, Istanbul, Turkey

Preceded by Torbjörn Blomdahl	Three-Cushion World Cup Champion; 2003	Succeeded by Daniel Sánchez
