= Cue sports at the 2005 World Games =

- Venue: Saalbau Bottrop
- Dates: 20–24 July 2005
- Competitors: 64 from 32 nations

The cue sports competition at the 2005 World Games, including three-cushion billiards, nine-ball, and snooker, took place from 20 to 24 July at the Saalbau Bottrop in Bottrop, Germany. 64 competitors, from 32 nations, participated in the tournament.

== Participating nations ==
- Aruba (1)
- Australia (3)
- Austria (1)
- Belgium (2)
- Brazil (1)
- Canada (1)
- China (1)
- Chinese Taipei (4)
- Colombia (1)
- Denmark (1)
- Ecuador (1)
- Egypt (2)
- Germany (9)
- Great Britain (6)
- Greece (1)
- Italy (1)
- Japan (3)
- Malta (1)
- Netherlands (2)
- Norway (1)
- Peru (1)
- Singapore (1)
- South Africa (3)
- South Korea (3)
- Spain (3)
- Sweden (2)
- Switzerland (1)
- Turkey (2)
- United Arab Emirates (1)
- United States (2)
- Venezuela (1)
- Vietnam (1)

== Medal table ==
* Host nation (Germany)

Rank	Nation	Gold	Silver	Bronze	Total
1	Chinese Taipei (TPE)	1	1	0	2
2	Austria (AUT)	1	0	0	1
2	Great Britain (GBR)	1	0	0	1
2	Spain (ESP)	1	0	0	1
5	China (CHN)	0	1	0	1
5	Germany (GER)*	0	1	0	1
5	Netherlands (NED)	0	1	0	1
8	Belgium (BEL)	0	0	1	1
8	Norway (NOR)	0	0	1	1
8	Turkey (TUR)	0	0	1	1
8	United States (USA)	0	0	1	1
Totals (11 entries)		4	4	4	12

== Medals summary ==
Event	Gold	Silver	Bronze
Three-cushion billiards – men's singles	Daniel Sánchez (ESP)	Dick Jaspers (NED)	Semih Saygıner (TUR)
Nine-ball – men's singles	Chang Pei-wei (TPE)	Thorsten Hohmann (GER)	Rodney Morris (USA)
Nine-ball – women's singles	Jasmin Ouschan (AUT)	Chen Chun-chen (TPE)	Line Kjörsvik (NOR)
Snooker – men's singles	Gerard Greene (GBR)	Ding Junhui (CHN)	Bjorn Haneveer (BEL)
