= Three-cushion billiards at the 2005 World Games – men's singles =

Three-cushion billiards men's singles at the 2005 World Games
- Venue: Saalbau Bottrop, Duisburg, Germany
- Dates: 20–24 July 2005
- Competitors: 16 from 13 nations

Medalists
gold medal	(Spain) Daniel Sánchez
silver medal	(Netherlands) Dick Jaspers
bronze medal	(Turkey) Semih Saygıner

The men's singles three-cushion billiards competition at the 2005 World Games took place from 20 to 24 July 2005 at the Saalbau Bottrop in Duisburg, Germany.

== Last 16 ==
Dick Jaspers (Netherlands)	40–24	(Germany) Christian Rudolph
Martin Horn (Germany)	40–20	(Ecuador) Javier Teran Noboa
Torbjörn Blomdahl (Sweden)	40–17	(Egypt) Ihab El Messery
Semih Saygıner (Turkey)	40–18	(Japan) Ryuuji Umeda
Murat Naci Coklu (Turkey)	40–36	(Vietnam) Duong Anh Vu
Frédéric Caudron (Belgium)	40–23	(Peru) Ramon Rodriguez
Luis Aveiga (Spain)	40–37	(Colombia) Jaime Bedoya
Daniel Sánchez (Spain)	40–20	(South Korea) Choi Jae-Dong

== Last 8 ==
Quarter-finals
(Netherlands) Dick Jaspers	40
(Germany) Martin Horn	35
(Sweden) Torbjörn Blomdahl	38
(Turkey) Semih Saygıner	40
(Turkey) Murat Naci Coklu	40
(Belgium) Frédéric Caudron	24
(Spain) Luis Aveiga	33
(Spain) Daniel Sánchez	40

Semi-finals
(Netherlands) Dick Jaspers	40
(Turkey) Semih Saygıner	26
(Turkey) Murat Naci Coklu	27
(Spain) Daniel Sánchez	40

Gold medal match
(Netherlands) Dick Jaspers	41
(Spain) Daniel Sánchez	42
Bronze medal match
(Turkey) Semih Saygıner	40
(Turkey) Murat Naci Coklu	32
