= Verhoeven Open =

Three-cushion billiards competition

2016 tournament logo

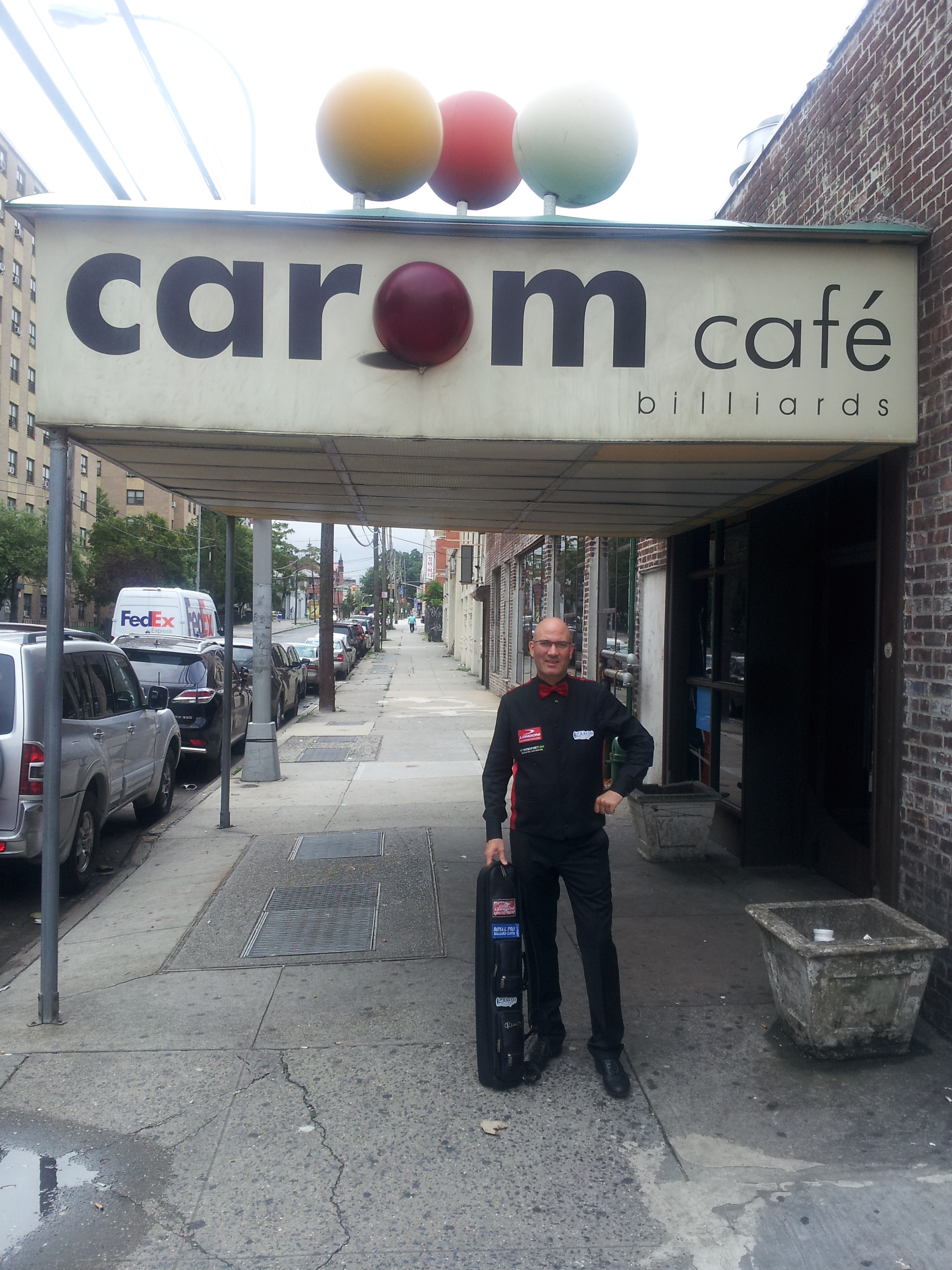
Martin Horn at the entrance of the Carom Café in 2016.

The Verhoeven Open is a three-cushion billiards tournament held in Flushing, Queens in the US state of New York. The event is sanctioned by the Union Mondiale de Billard and the United States Billiard Association. The event was known as Sang Lee International Open between 2005 and 2008.

== History ==
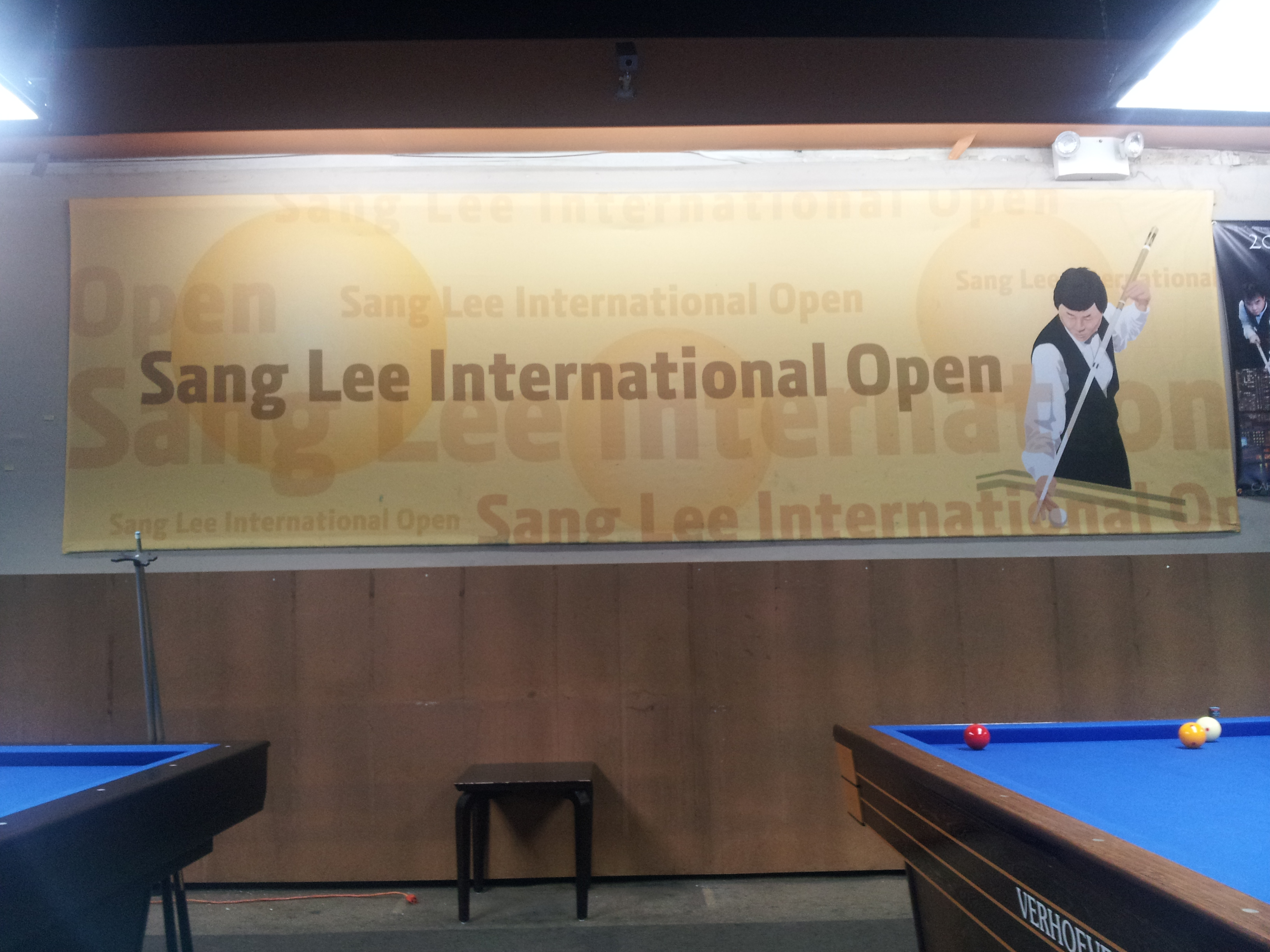
Tournament poster of Sang Lee international Open inside of the Carom Café.

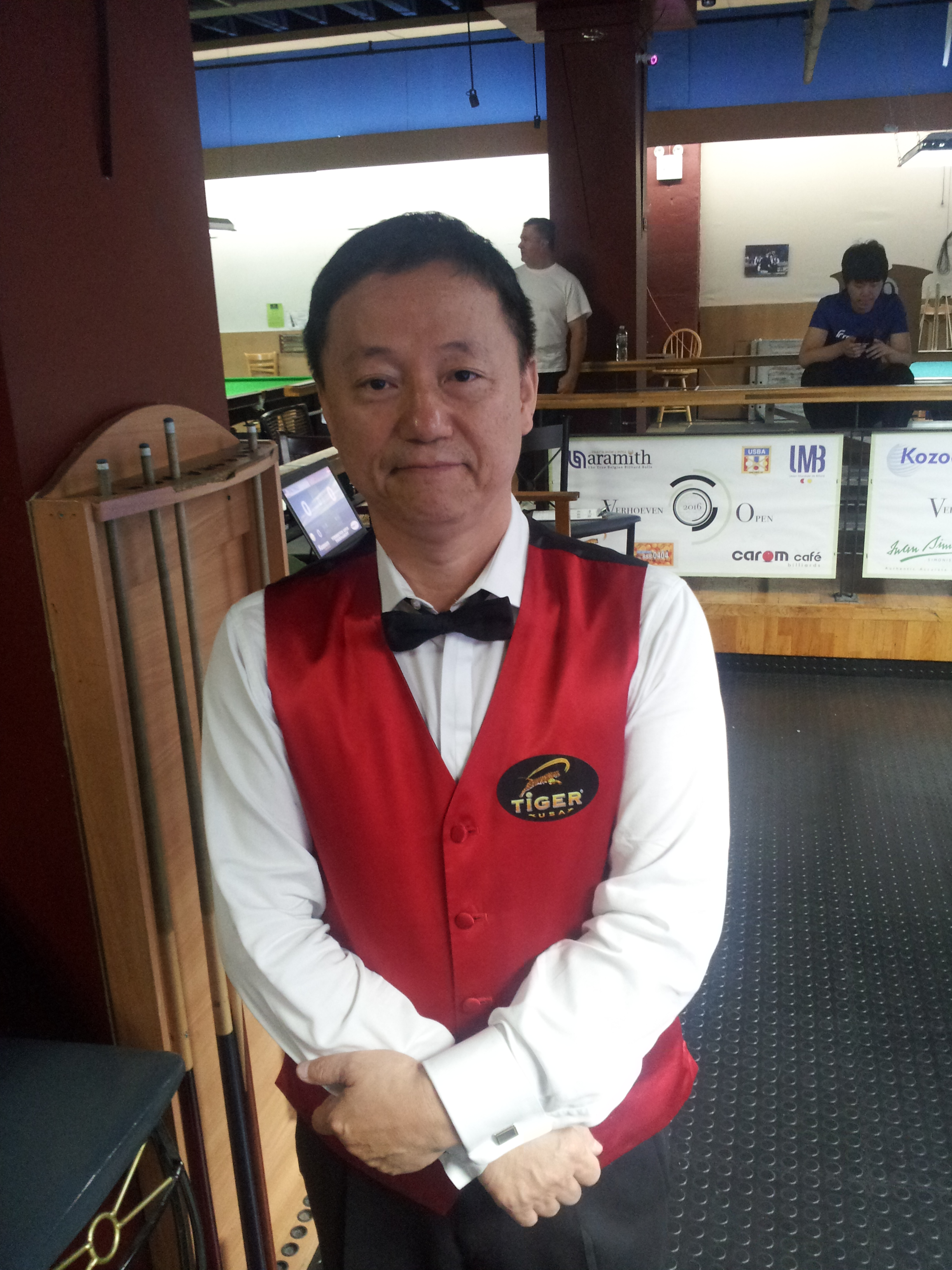
Michael Kang is the co-founder of the Carom Café and friend of Sang Lee.

=== Sang Lee International Open ===
It was founded in 2005 as the Sang Lee International Open, named after Sang Lee, a Korean American player whose goal was to spread his principles as a player and restore the popularity of carom billiards in the United States. One year after his death in 2004, his friend Ira Lee initiated the tournament in tribute to him. It was organized by the United States Billiard Association (USBA) as a member of the world federation Union Mondiale de Billard. The venue for the tournament is the Carom Café, which was founded by Sang Lee (not Ira Lee who is not related to Sang) and his friend Michael Kang, who was also one of the best players in the United States at that time.

Contrary to most other tournaments it was not played in the set system, but to a predetermined score. The structure of the tournament has been changed several times since 2005.

The inaugural event (2005) was won by Sweden's Torbjörn Blomdahl. The 2006 and 2007 editions were both dominated by Frédéric Caudron of Belgium. Roland Forthomme, also from Belgium, won it in 2008. The 2008 edition was the last time the event was named as Sang Lee International Open.

=== Verhoeven Open ===
After a four-year break, the tournament was relaunched in 2012 under the name Verhoeven Open Tournament (or short Verhoeven Open) by Cindy Lee, CEO of billiards-event organizer Dragon Promotions.

In 2012, 20 players participated at the tournament. Winner was the local hero Pedro Piedrabuena, who beat Torbjörn Blomdahl from Sweden with 40:37 in the final. After a long pause of playing tournaments, the 75-year-old Belgian "Mr. 100 " Raymond Ceulemans was honors player of the tournament and could, after all, still occupy the seventh rank.

== Prize money and ranking points ==
Prize Money 2007
Rank	Prize money (US$)	Rank	Prize money (US$)
1	12,000	11	2,800
2	9,600	12	2,400
3	8,000	13	2,100
4	6,400	14	1,800
5	5,600	15	1,700
6	4,800	16	1,600
7	4,400	17	1,500
8	4,000	18	1,400
9	3,600	19	1,300
10	3,200	20	1,200
Bonuses
HS	300	BG	300
Total amount: 80,000 US$

The following table shows prize money and ranking points (only for USBA-players).

Prize Money
Rank	US$	Rank	US$
1	8,000	11	550
2	5,000	12	550
3	4,000	13	500
4	3,500	14	500
5	2,700	15	450
6	2,200	16	450
7	1,700	17	425
8	1,200	18	425
9	1,000	19	400
10	800	20	400
Total amount: 34,750 US$

USBA-Points
Rank	Points
1.	80
2.	60
3.	50
4.	40
5. & 6.	30
7. & 8.	25
9.–12.	20
13.–16.	15
17.–24	10
25.–32	5
≥ 33	3

== Tournament statistic ==
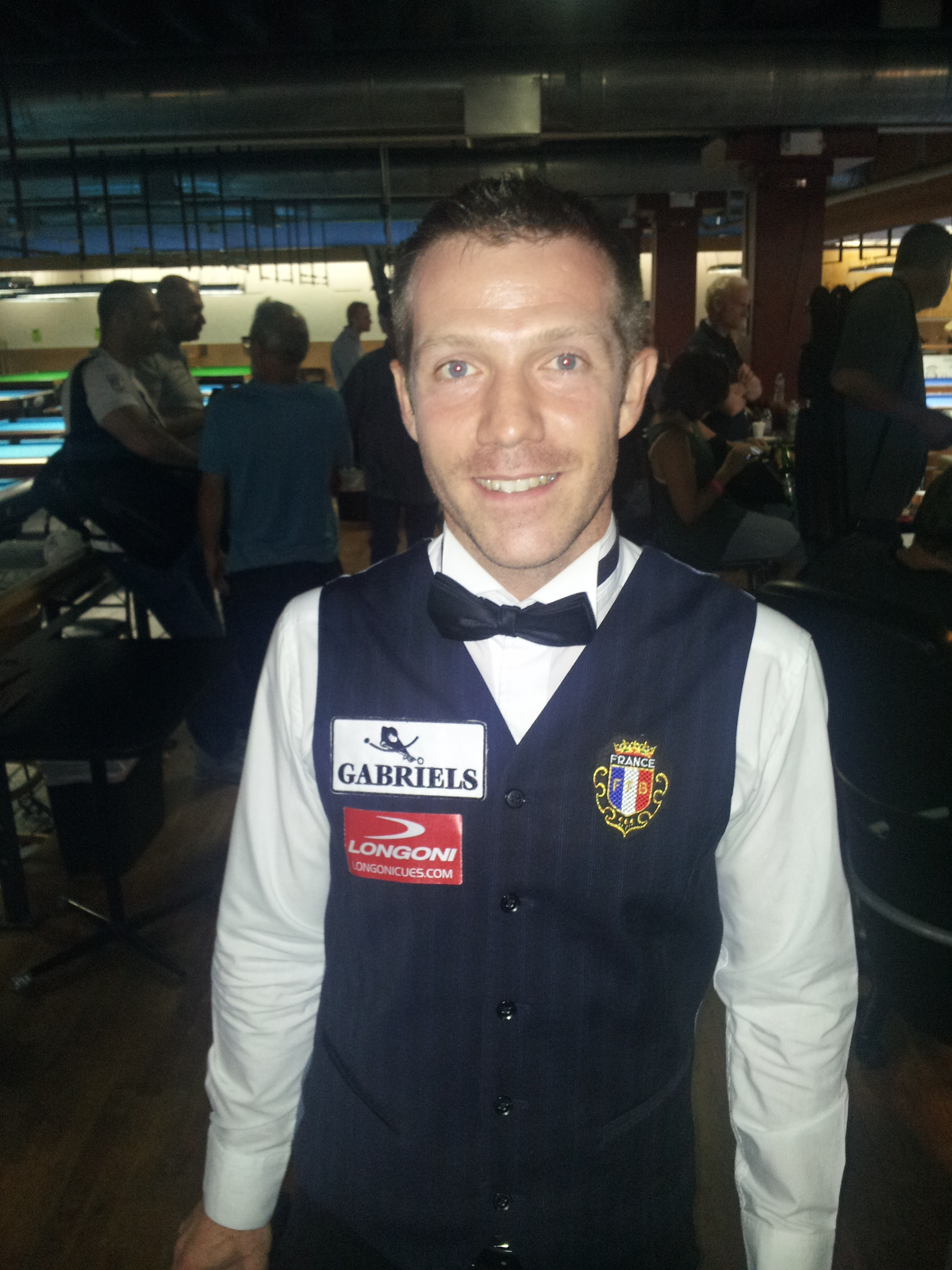
Jérémy Bury, winner of 2016

The GA shows the general average (all points ÷ all innings).

=== Men ===
Sang Lee International Open
Year	Winner	GA	Runner up	GA	3. Place	GA	Ref.
2005	(Sweden) Torbjörn Blomdahl	2,006	(Turkey) Semih Saygıner	1,998	(Netherlands) Dick Jaspers	1,907	
2006	(Belgium) Frédéric Caudron	1,881	(Sweden) Torbjörn Blomdahl	1,851	(Turkey) Semih Saygıner	1,741	
2007	(Belgium) Frédéric Caudron	1,774	(Spain) Dani Sánchez	1,889	(Turkey) Semih Saygıner	1,615	
2008	(Belgium) Roland Forthomme	1,829	(Belgium) Frédéric Caudron	1,958	(Sweden) Torbjörn Blomdahl	1,707	
Verhoeven Open Tournament
Year	Winner	GA	Runner up	GA	3. Place	GA	Ref.
2012	(United States) Pedro Piedrabuena	1,592	(Sweden) Torbjörn Blomdahl	1,708	(Belgium) Roland Forthomme	1,658	
2013	(Belgium) Frédéric Caudron	2,066	(Belgium) Eddy Merckx	1,886	(Sweden) Torbjörn Blomdahl	1,838	
2014	(Sweden) Torbjörn Blomdahl	2,058	(Belgium) Eddy Merckx	1,941	(Belgium) Frédéric Caudron	1,927	
2015	(Netherlands) Dick Jaspers	2,097	(Turkey) Tayfun Taşdemir	1,715	(Belgium) Frédéric Caudron	1,931	
2016	(France) Jérémy Bury	1,542	(Netherlands) Dick Jaspers	1,975	(Belgium) Eddy Merckx	1,775	
2017	(South Korea) Cho Jae-ho	1,650	(Belgium) Eddy Leppens	1,897	(Spain) Dani Sánchez	1,847	
2018	(Belgium) Eddy Merckx	1,872	(Spain) Dani Sánchez	1,937	(Germany) Martin Horn	1,908	
2018	(Belgium) Eddy Merckx	1,872	(Spain) Dani Sánchez	1,937	(Belgium) Eddy Leppens	1,597	
2019	(Belgium) Eddy Merckx	1,798	(Sweden) Torbjörn Blomdahl	1,777	(Spain) Dani Sánchez	1,773	

=== Women ===
In 2013 for the first time a competition for women was held. It took place from July 14 to 16, right before the men's competition. Winner was world number one Therese Klompenhouwer from the Netherlands. She beat the four-time world champion Orie Hida from Japan 25:16 in 17 innings in the final. However Hida played the best individual average with 1,562. Klompenhouwer succeeded with 9 points in the best high run.

In 2015 the women's tournament was called Jennifer Shim International. The tournament was named in memory of the American elite player Jennifer Shim, who was shot on March 6, 2015, by her ex-boyfriend at the age of 41.

Year	Winner	GA	Runner up	GA	3. Place/; Semi Finalists	GA	Ref.
Verhoeven Open Tournament
2013	(Netherlands) Therese Klompenhouwer	1,016	(Japan) Orie Hida	0,850	(South Korea) Park Su-ah	0,631	
Jennifer Shim International
2015	(Netherlands) Therese Klompenhouwer	1,123	(Cambodia) Pheavy Srong	0,662	(Japan) Orie Hida	0,970	
2017	(Netherlands) Therese Klompenhouwer	1,116	(Japan) Orie Hida	1,035	(South Korea) Lee Mi-rae	0,648	
2019	(South Korea) Han Ji-eun	0,863	(Netherlands) Therese Klompenhouwer	1,195	(Japan) Orie Hida	0,780	
2019	(South Korea) Han Ji-eun	0,863	(Netherlands) Therese Klompenhouwer	1,195	(Japan) Yuko Nishimoto	0,754	
