= Three-cushion billiards at the 2022 World Games – Men's 3-cushion carom =

Three-cushion billiards men's singles at the 2022 World Games
- Venue: Birmingham Jefferson Convention Complex, Birmingham, United States
- Dates: 13–17 July 2022
- Competitors: 16 from 15 nations

Medalists
gold medal	(Netherlands) Dick Jaspers
silver medal	(Colombia) José Juan García
bronze medal	(Belgium) Eddy Merckx

The men's singles three-cushion billiards competition at the 2022 World Games took place from 13 to 17 July 2022 at the Birmingham Jefferson Convention Complex in Birmingham, United States.

== Competition format ==
A total of 16 players entered the competition. They competed in knock-out system.

== Bracket ==
Round of 16
(Netherlands) Dick Jaspers	40
(United States) Pedro Piedrabuena	11
(Sweden) Torbjörn Blomdahl	40
(Germany) Martin Horn	35
(Belgium) Eddy Merckx	40
(Costa Rica) Erick Téllez	16
(South Korea) Seo Chang-hoon	18
(Spain) Daniel Sánchez	40
(Vietnam) Trần Quyết Chiến	40
(Ecuador) Javier Teran	19
(Colombia) José Juan García	40
(Turkey) Tayfun Taşdemir	35
(Egypt) Sameh Sidhom	34
(Colombia) Pedro González	40
(Japan) Kouji Funaki	40
(Italy) Marco Zanetti	23

Quarter-finals
(Netherlands) Dick Jaspers	40
(Sweden) Torbjörn Blomdahl	20
(Belgium) Eddy Merckx	40
(Spain) Daniel Sánchez	38
(Vietnam) Trần Quyết Chiến	26
(Colombia) José Juan García	40
(Colombia) Pedro González	40
(Japan) Kouji Funaki	24

Semi-finals
(Netherlands) Dick Jaspers	40
(Belgium) Eddy Merckx	16
(Colombia) José Juan García	40
(Colombia) Pedro González	23

Final
(Netherlands) Dick Jaspers	40
(Colombia) José Juan García	18
Third place
(Belgium) Eddy Merckx	40
(Colombia) Pedro González	24
