= Three-cushion billiards at the 2009 World Games – men's singles =

Three-cushion billiards men's singles at the 2009 World Games
- Venue: Chung Cheng Martial Arts Stadium, Kaohsiung, Taiwan
- Dates: 22–26 July 2009
- Competitors: 16 from 15 nations

Medalists
gold medal	(Netherlands) Dick Jaspers
silver medal	(Sweden) Torbjörn Blomdahl
bronze medal	(Italy) Marco Zanetti

The men's singles three-cushion billiards competition at the 2009 World Games took place from 22 to 26 July 2009 at the Chung Cheng Martial Arts Stadium in Kaohsiung, Taiwan.

== Last 16 ==
Marco Zanetti (Italy)	40–19	(Colombia) Alexander Salazar
Yuan Yung-Kuo (Chinese Taipei)	40–37	(Egypt) Sameh Sidhom
Tatsuo Arai (Japan)	40–22	(Ecuador) Javier Teran
Jean Christophe Roux (France)	23–40	(Sweden) Torbjörn Blomdahl
George Sakkas (Greece)	18–40	(South Korea) Kim Kyung-roul
Daniel Sánchez (Spain)	40–27	(Colombia) Henry Diaz Parada
Roland Forthomme (Belgium)	40–34	(Vietnam) Duong Anh Vu
Carlos Ceballos (Guatemala)	20–40	(Netherlands) Dick Jaspers

== Last 8 ==
Quarter-finals
(Italy) Marco Zanetti	40
(Chinese Taipei) Yuan Yung-Kuo	15
(Japan) Tatsuo Arai	16
(Sweden) Torbjörn Blomdahl	40
(South Korea) Kim Kyung-roul	24
(Spain) Daniel Sánchez	40
(Belgium) Roland Forthomme	15
(Netherlands) Dick Jaspers	40

Semi-finals
(Italy) Marco Zanetti	39
(Sweden) Torbjörn Blomdahl	40
(Spain) Daniel Sánchez	26
(Netherlands) Dick Jaspers	40

Gold medal match
(Sweden) Torbjörn Blomdahl	18
(Netherlands) Dick Jaspers	40
Bronze medal match
(Italy) Marco Zanetti	40
(Spain) Daniel Sánchez	38
