= FC Porto (billiards) =

FC Porto Billiards Section
- Full name: Futebol Clube do Porto
- Short name: Porto
- Founded: 1950
- Chairman: Jorge Nuno Pinto da Costa
- Manager: Alípio Jorge Fernandes
- League: Portuguese Championship
- 2018–19: 1st – Three-cushion (Men); 1st – Pool (Women)
- Website: https://www.fcporto.pt/pt/modalidades/bilhar/noticias

The Billiards Section of Futebol Clube do Porto is a professional billiards team based in Porto, Portugal, founded in 1950. The team competes in the Portuguese Billiards League and in European Championships, in both carom billiards (three-cushion) and pool (eight-ball and nine-ball) events. They play their home games in the former headquarters of the club and they also have a billiards school, the first in the country.

The most important achievements in this section history were the four silver medals won in 1998–99, 2007–08, 2011–12 and 2015–16 in the European Cup, having also achieved six bronze medals in this competition in 1971–72, 1995–96, 2004–05, 2010–11, 2013–14 and 2014–15.

In Portugal, the men's and women's squads have achieved many championships, as well as many other trophies making the section one of the most titled in the country. One of the greatest players of this section, Alípio Jorge Fernandes, received the Galardão de Ouro in representation of the president Pinto da Costa, a trophy attributed to the club because of its accomplishments.

== Current squads ==
According to the official website.

Squads	Nat.	Players	Birth date and age	Ref.
Three cushion (Men)	(Portugal)	Alípio Jorge Fernandes	6 June 1949 (age 77)	
Three cushion (Men)	(Spain)	Daniel Sánchez (C)	3 March 1974 (age 52)	
Three cushion (Men)	(Netherlands)	Dick Jaspers	23 July 1965 (age 61)	
Three cushion (Men)	(Portugal)	Fernando Cunha	16 August 1952 (age 73)	
Three cushion (Men)	(Portugal)	João Ferreira	17 January 1994 (age 32)	
Three cushion (Men)	(Portugal)	Manuel Santos Oliveira	30 March 1952 (age 74)	
Three cushion (Men)	(South Korea)	Myung-Woo Cho	18 August 1998 (age 27)	
Three cushion (Men)	(Spain)	Ruben Legazpi	27 July 1982 (age 44)	
Three cushion (Men)	(Portugal)	Rui Manuel Costa	24 May 1960 (age 66)	
Three cushion (Men)	(Sweden)	Torbjörn Blomdahl	26 October 1962 (age 63)	
Three cushion (Men)	(Portugal)	Hugo Costa	5 May 1994 (age 32)	
Three cushion (Men)	(Portugal)	Jorge Costa	18 May 1993 (age 33)	
Three cushion (Men)	(Portugal)	José Miguel Soares	13 September 1994 (age 31)	
Pool (Women)	(Portugal)	Ágata Castro	6 December 1974 (age 51)	
Pool (Women)	(Spain)	Amália Matas	2 February 1988 (age 38)	
Pool (Women)	(Belgium)	Kamila Khodjaeva	21 February 1996 (age 30)	
Pool (Women)	(Portugal)	Mariana Marinho	24 April 1982 (age 44)	
Pool (Women)	(Portugal)	Vânia Franco (C)	11 May 1978 (age 48)	
Pool (Women)	(Portugal)	Marta Tavares	9 June 1989 (age 37)	

== Honours ==
According to Porto's official website and the Portuguese Billiards Federation Portal.

=== Three-cushion (Men) ===
==== Domestic competitions ====
- Portuguese Championship

Winners (28): 1971–72, 1975–76, 1980–81, 1982–83, 1983–84, 1987–88, 1992–93, 1993–94, 1996–97, 1999–00, 2001–02, 2002–03, 2004–05, 2005–06, 2006–07, 2007–08, 2010–11, 2011–12, 2012–13, 2013–14, 2015–16, 2016–17, 2017–18, 2018–19, 2020–21, 2021–22, 2022–23, 2025–26

- Portuguese Cup

Winners (23): 1983–84, 1993–94, 1994–95, 2001–02, 2002–03, 2003–04, 2005–06, 2006–07, 2007–08, 2010–11, 2011–12, 2012–13, 2013–14, 2014–15, 2016–17, 2017–18, 2018–19, 2020–21, 2021–22, 2022–23, 2023–24, 2024–25, 2025–26

- Portuguese Super Cup

Winners (21): 1994, 1997, 2000, 2001, 2003, 2004, 2006, 2008, 2011, 2012, 2013, 2014, 2015, 2016, 2018, 2019, 2020, 2022, 2023, 2024, 2025

- Aperture Tournament / North Zone

Winners (8): 2010–11, 2011–12, 2012–13, 2014–15, 2015–16, 2016–17, 2018–19, 2019–20

==== European competitions ====
- CEB European Cup / Club Teams

(gold) Winners (3): 2016–17, 2021–22, 2022–23
(silver) 2nd place (5): 1998–99, 2007–08, 2011–12, 2015–16, 2018–19
(bronze) 3rd place (7): 1971–72, 1995–96, 2004–05, 2010–11, 2013–14, 2014–15, 2017–18

=== Pool (Men) ===
- Portuguese Championship

Winners (3): 2000–01, 2001–02, 2002–03

- Portuguese Cup

Winners (2): 2001–02, 2002–03

- Portuguese Super Cup

Winners (2): 2001–02, 2002–03

=== Pool (Women) ===
- Portuguese Championship

Winners (15): 1997–98, 2002–03, 2004–05, 2005–06, 2006–07, 2007–08, 2010–11, 2012–13, 2014–15, 2015–16, 2016–17, 2017–18, 2018–19, 2020–21, 2023–24

- Portuguese Cup

Winners (15): 1997–98, 1998–99, 1999–00, 2001–02, 2002–03, 2003–04, 2004–05, 2006–07, 2007–08, 2008–09, 2011–12, 2014–15, 2015–16, 2018–19, 2020–21

- Portuguese Super Cup

Winners (15): 1998, 2003, 2004, 2005, 2007, 2008, 2010, 2011, 2012, 2013, 2015, 2017, 2019, 2021, 2024

=== Snooker (Men) ===
- Portuguese Championship

Winners (2): 2015–16, 2016–17

- Portuguese Cup

Winners (1): 2016–17

- Portuguese Super Cup

Winners (1): 2015–16
