= Edward Lee (billiards player) =

Medal record

Men's three-cushion billiards

Representing United States

World Three-cushion Championship
| Gold medal – first place | 1936 | Individual |

Edward Lancaster Lee (29 September 1905 – 18 May 1969) was an American professional carom billiards player from New York City.

== Career ==
Although three-cushion billiards was popular in the United States at that time, most of the American players competed in the World Championship staged in their country where the likes of Willie Hoppe and Welker Cochran were the dominant contenders. Edward Lee, however, was the only American three-cushion player at the time to win the UMB World Three-cushion Championship, defeating fellow American Eugene Deardorff for the title in 1936.

As an amateur, Lee (representing the exclusive New York Athletic Club) won the 1931 National Association of Amateur Billiard Players Championship, defeating Alfredo de Oro Jr., son of the famed Cuban World Champion, 50–27 in the 73rd inning, despite de Oro sweeping 16 innings in a row at one point in the match.

Lee was also a top amateur long-distance swimmer.

| Preceded by (France) Alfred Lagache | UMB World Three-cushion Champion; 1936 | Succeeded by (France) Alfred Lagache |
