= Cue sports at the 2001 World Games =

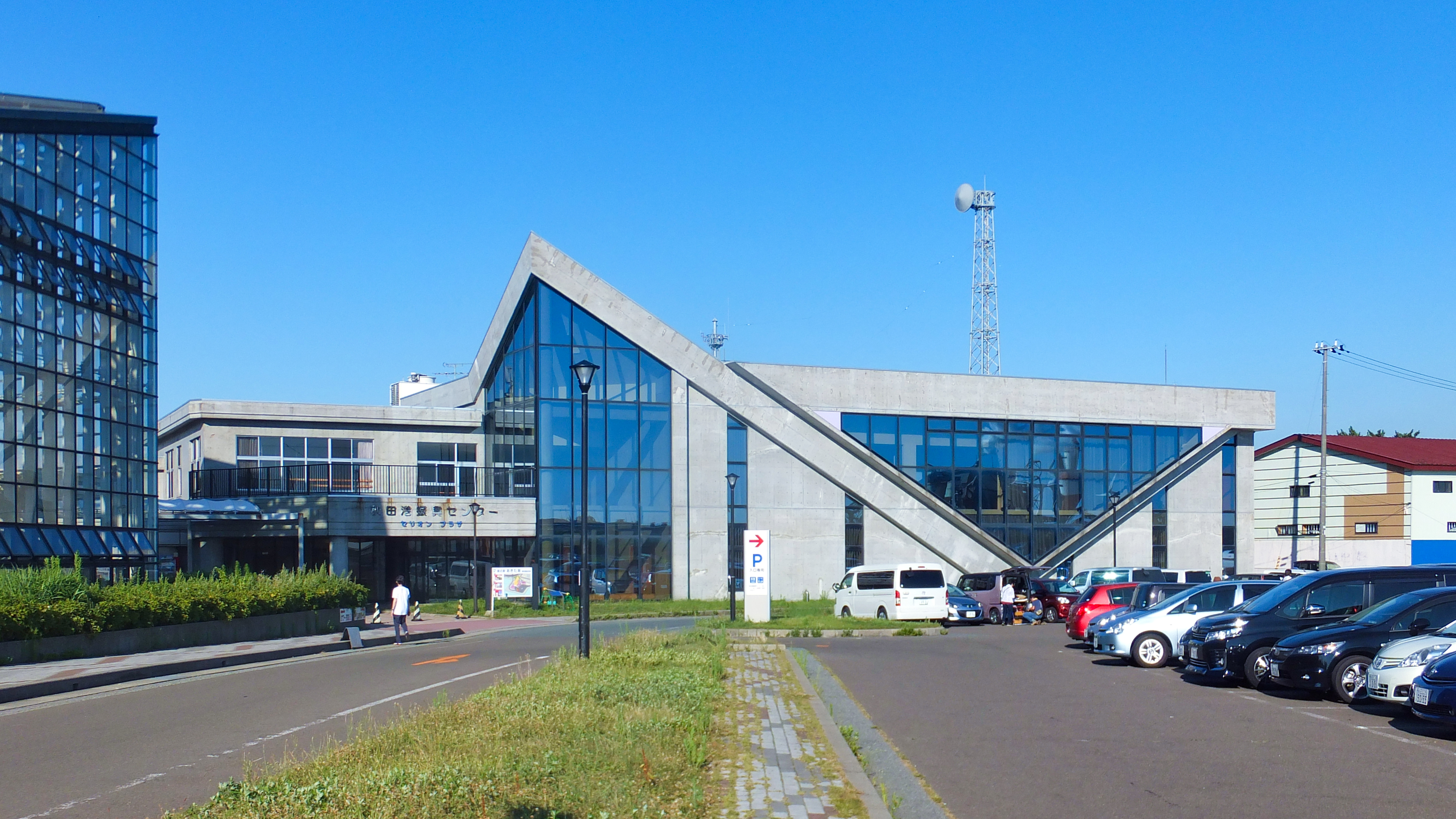
- Venue: Selion Plaza
- Dates: 22–26 August 2001
- Competitors: 62 from 24 nations

The cue sports competition at the 2001 World Games, including three-cushion billiards, nine-ball (a pool discipline) and snooker, took place from 22 to 26 August at the Selion Plaza in Akita, Japan. 62 competitors, from 24 nations, participated in the tournament.

== Participating nations ==
- Australia (3)
- Belgium (2)
- Canada (2)
- Chinese Taipei (5)
- Colombia (2)
- Egypt (2)
- Germany (5)
- Great Britain (4)
- Hong Kong (1)
- Ireland (1)
- Japan (9)
- Netherlands (3)
- Mexico (3)
- New Zealand (2)
- Pakistan (1)
- Peru (1)
- Philippines (1)
- South Africa (1)
- South Korea (3)
- Spain (1)
- Sweden (2)
- Thailand (2)
- Turkey (1)
- United States (5)

== Medal table ==
Rank	Nation	Gold	Silver	Bronze	Total
1	Chinese Taipei	1	0	1	2
1	United States	1	0	1	2
3	Belgium	1	0	0	1
3	Spain	1	0	0	1
5	Germany	0	1	1	2
6	Great Britain	0	1	0	1
6	Netherlands	0	1	0	1
6	Philippines	0	1	0	1
9	Pakistan	0	0	1	1
Totals (9 entries)		4	4	4	12

== Events ==
Event	Gold	Silver	Bronze
Three-cushion billiards – men's singles	Daniel Sánchez (ESP)	Dick Jaspers (NED)	Sang Chun Lee (USA)
Nine-ball – men's singles	Yang Ching-shun (TPE)	Ralf Souquet (GER)	Thomas Engert (GER)
Nine-ball – women's singles	Jeanette Lee (USA)	Karen Corr (GBR)	Chen Chun-chen (TPE)
Snooker – men's singles	Bjorn Haneveer (BEL)	Marlon Manalo (PHI)	Shokat Ali (PAK)
