= Lagache =

Lagache is a surname. Notable people with the surname include:

- Alfred Lagache (1889 –1971), French professional three-cushion billiards player
- André Lagache (1885–1938), French racing driver
- Daniel Lagache (1903–1972), French physician, psychoanalyst and professor at the Sorbonne

== See also ==
- Chardon Lagache (Paris Métro), station on the Paris Métro
- Monchy-Lagache, commune in the Somme department in Hauts-de-France in northern France
