= Eddy Merckx (billiards player) =

Belgian billiards player

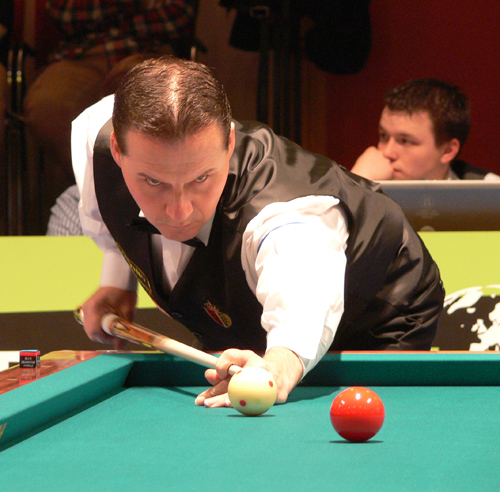

Medal record

Men's three-cushion billiards

Representing Belgium

World Games
Silver medal – second place	2013 Cali	Individual
Bronze medal – third place	2022 Birmingham	Individual

World Championship
Gold medal – first place	2006 Sankt Wendel	Three-cushion
Gold medal – first place	2012 Porto	Three-cushion
Gold medal – first place	2026 Blois	Three-cushion
Silver medal – second place	2009 Lausanne	Three-cushion
Silver medal – second place	2017 Santa Cruz	Three-cushion
Silver medal – second place	2025 Antwerp	Three-cushion
Bronze medal – third place	2015 Bordeaux	Three-cushion
Bronze medal – third place	2022 Donghae City	Three-cushion
Bronze medal – third place	2024 Phan Thiết	Three-cushion

European Championship
Gold medal – first place	2007 Salon-de-Provence	Three-cushion
Silver medal – second place	2009 Sankt Wendel	Three-cushion

Eddy Merckx (born 4 September 1968 in Reet, Belgium) is a Belgian professional three-cushion billiards player.

== Career ==
=== Season 2006/07 ===
In the year 2006, he beat Nikos Polychronopoulos 3–1 to win the world title in three cushions billiards. In 2007, he added the European title in Salon de Provence in France, by beating the reigning champion Frédéric Caudron.

=== Season 2011/12 ===
On 8 October 2011, while playing in the German Bundesliga in Duisburg, Merckx defeated Won Kang 50–6 in six innings, a world record. The inning breakdown was 4-9-26-7-0-4. The previous record for a 50-point game was nine innings, shared by Torbjorn Blomdahl, Frederic Caudron and Marco Zanetti.

=== Season 2012/13 ===
From 27 August to 1 September 2012 Merckx played in the invitation tournament Cuvino Superprestige, which was held in the city of Lommel, Belgium. The Belgians where looking for their fifth title of king of 3-cushion and it was Merckx who beat world number one ranked Frédéric Caudron in the final. Just a week later, on 9 September 2012, he won his second UMB world title in Porto by again defeating Caudron in the semis and Choi Sung-Won in the finals. Another week later he was playing in Suwon on the 3-Cushion World Cup and won third place together with Dick Jaspers from the Netherlands. He was climbing up to third place of the world ranking due to these wins.

== Achievements ==
- 3-Cushion World Champion (Single): Winner 2006, 2012, 2026 • Runner-up 2009, 2017, 2025
- 3-Cushion European Champion: Winner 2007 • Runner-up 2010, 2011
- 3-Cushion World Cup: Winner 2005, 2009, 2011 • Runner-up 2008
- Chrystal Kelly Tournament: Third 2009
- 3-Cushion Invitation Tournament in Zundert/Netherlands: Winner 2003 • Runner-up 2004, 2005
- Superprestige in Belgium: Winner 2012 • Third 2011
- Belgium Championship: Winner 2004, 2006, 2008, 2010, 2011, 2012, 2014, 2018, 2020, 2023 en 2025
