= Alfred Lagache =

Personal information
- Born: 24 October 1889
- Died: 18 August 1971 (aged 81)

Pool career
- Country: France
- Pool games: Three-cushion billiards

Tournament wins
- Major: CEB European Three-cushion Championship (1935, 1939, 1947 and 1949)
- World Champion: UMB World Three-cushion Champion (1935, 1937)

Alfred Lagache (24 October 1889 – 18 August 1971) was a French professional three-cushion billiards player.

== Career ==
A number of players from France have won world championships in different disciplines of carom billiards, but Lagache has been the only Frenchman to ever win the UMB World Three-cushion Championship, taking the title in 1935 and again in 1937. Lagache would also finish third the following season, in 1938.

He also won the CEB European Three-cushion Championship in 1935, 1939, 1947 and 1949. Lagache would also finish third the following season

Preceded by (Spain) Claudio Puigvert	World Three-cushion Champion; 1935	Succeeded by (United States) Edward Lee
Preceded by (United States) Edward Lee	World Three-cushion Champion; 1937	Succeeded by (Argentina) Augusto Vergez

Preceded by (Switzerland) Franz Aeberhard	European Three-cushion Champion; 1935	Succeeded by (France) Alfred Lagache
Preceded by (France) Alfred Lagache	European Three-cushion Champion; 1939	Succeeded by (France) Alfred Lagache
Preceded by (France) Alfred Lagache	European Three-cushion Champion; 1947	Succeeded by (Spain) Joaquín Domingo
Preceded by (Spain) Joaquín Domingo	European Three-cushion Champion; 1949	Succeeded by (Netherlands) Bert Wevers
