= CEB European Three-cushion Championship =

Billiards tournament

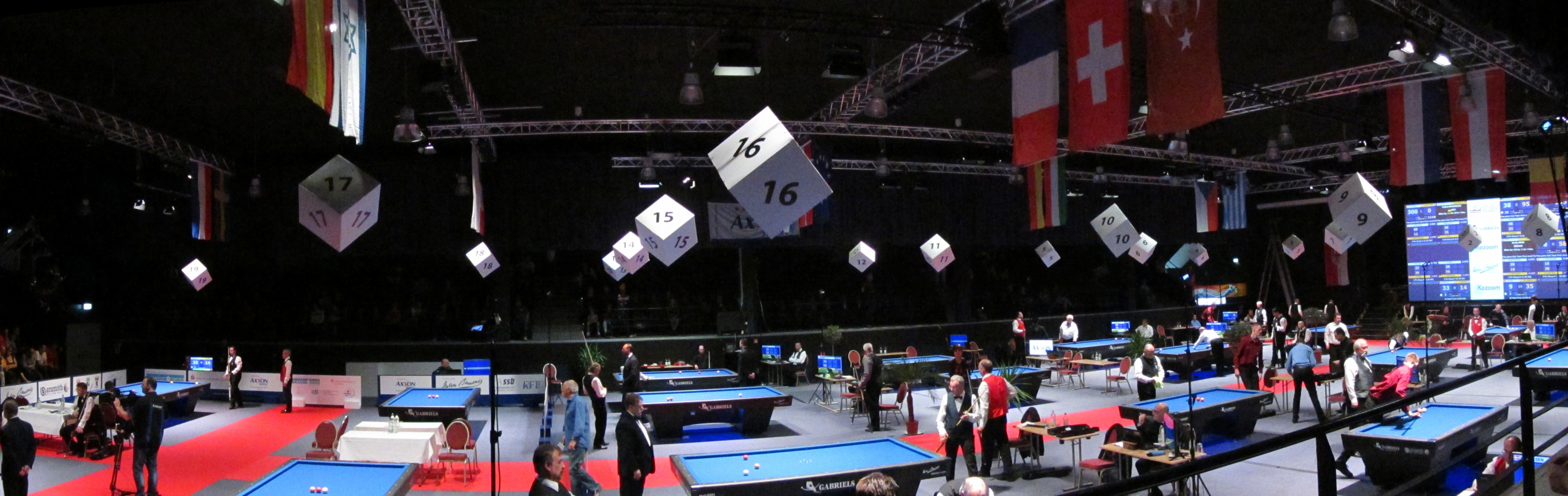
Panoramic shot of the venue.

The CEB European Three-cushion Championship is three-cushion billiards tournament organized by the Confédération Européenne de Billard. Held since 1932, it is one of longest-running tournaments in the sport. The 2007 event offered a total purse of €18,500 (US$26,134) with €4,000 ($5,651) for the winner.

Before 1995, there was a third place match played between the two losing finalists, in order to determine the ranking. However, the match has been cancelled since then and the losing finalists are regarded as having the same ranking in the competition.

Since the season 2012/13 the tournament was held in a mammoth event every two years in Brandenburg an der Havel, Germany.

== History ==
Until the Second World War the European Championships were held only in the disciplines balkline and in three-cushion, and that even more irregular. After the war (1947) a regular, annual cycle was introduced. Exception was the season 1995/96. This had to do with the association disputes between the World Federation Union Mondiale de Billard (UMB) and the Billiards World Cup Association (BWA). It also meant that the players which were under contract with the BWA in the years 1993 to 1997 were not allowed to participate at the European Championship.

In the season 1956/57, there have been already two associations. In the dispute over sports and leadership policies within the "Union Internationale des Fédérations d'Amateurs de Billard" (UIFAB) culminated in the founding of the competing "Fédération Internationale de Billard" (FIB) and a "double" European Championships were held in straight rail, balkline, and three-cushion in 1957. The following year, the disputes were resolved and UIFAB was again the only European federation. This fusion was expressed in the founding/renamed into Confédération Européenne de Billard (CEB) on 12. July 1958.

== Prize money and ranking points ==
	Prize money (€)	Ranking points
Winner	8,000	80
Runner-up	4,000	54
Semi-finalists	2,500	38
5. – 8.	1,500	26
9. – 16.	750	16
17. – 32.	300	8
P-Quali	–	4
Overall	32,800	–
(current state: 2019)

== Tournament records (timeline) ==
Billiard legend Raymond Ceulemans from Belgium won the tournament more times (23) than any other player. His closest competitors for the record are country fellow René Vingerhoedt and Swedish Torbjörn Blomdahl at a distant 9 and 8 respectively. By delivering the European Champion for 22 consecutive years (1962-1983), Belgium also holds the record for most consecutive wins.

In 2013 Marco Zanetti played a new record General Average (GA) of 2.500. Frédéric Caudron puts up a new European record in High-run of 28 and equalizes the records of Junichi Komori (1993), Raymond Ceulemans (1998), and Roland Forthomme (2012).

General Average (GA)
GD	Name	Year
0,717	(Netherlands) Henk Robijns	1932
0,804	(France) Alfred Lagache	1939
0,827	(France) Roger Hanoun	1948
0,890	(France) Alfred Lagache	1949
0,895	(Belgium) René Vingerhoedt	1951
1,023	(Belgium) René Vingerhoedt	1952
1,190	(Belgium) René Vingerhoedt	1954
1,238	(Belgium) Raymond Ceulemans	1963
1,420	(Belgium) Cecilia Luxem	1965
1,538	(Belgium) Raymond Ceulemans	1969
1,621	(Belgium) Raymond Ceulemans	1971
1,808	(Belgium) Raymond Ceulemans	1991
2,314	(Belgium) Frédéric Caudron	2001
2,376	(Sweden) Torbjörn Blomdahl	2003
2,500	(Italy) Marco Zanetti	2013

Special Average (SA)
BED	Name	Year
0,925	(Netherlands) Henk Robijns	1932
	(France) Jacques Davin	1935
1,041	(France) Alfred Lagache	1939
1,111	(France) Alfred Lagache	1947
1,219	(France) Roger Hanoun	1948
1,219	(France) Alfred Lagache	1949
1,428	(Belgium) René Vingerhoedt	1952
1,428	(Belgium) René Vingerhoedt	1953
1,515	(Belgium) René Vingerhoedt	1954
1,724	(Belgium) René Vingerhoedt	1958
1,764	(Belgium) Raymond Ceulemans	1964
1,818	(Belgium) Raymond Ceulemans	1965
2,068	(Belgium) Raymond Ceulemans	1965
2,222	(Belgium) Raymond Ceulemans	1969
2,400	(Austria) Johann Scherz	1971
2,875	(Belgium) Raymond Ceulemans	1972
3,000	(Turkey) Tayfun Taşdemir	2002
3,461	(Sweden) Torbjörn Blomdahl	2003
3,461	(Belgium) Frédéric Caudron	2003
5,625	(Netherlands) Dick Jaspers	2008

High Run (HR)
HS	Name	Year
8	(Germany) Otto Unshelm	1932
9	(Belgium) René Vingerhoedt	1939
12	(France) Alfred Lagache	1948
15	(Netherlands) Herman Popeijus	1955
15	(Netherlands) Henny de Ruijter	1960
17	(Belgium) Raymond Ceulemans	1964
20	(Belgium) Raymond Ceulemans	1973
23	(Greece) Nikos Polychronopoulos	2012
28	(Belgium) Frédéric Caudron	2013

== Champions ==
The GA indicates the General Average.

No.	Year	Venue	Winner	GA	Runner-up	GA	3. Place	GA
1	1932	(Netherlands) Amsterdam	(Switzerland) Franz Aeberhard	0,659	(Netherlands) Henk Robijns	0,717	(Spain) Claudio Puigvert	0,613
2	1935	(Netherlands) Amsterdam	(France) Alfred Lagache	0,704	(France) Jaques Davin	0,686	(Belgium) Emile Zaman	0,595
3	1939	(France) Angoulême	(France) Alfred Lagache	0,804	(Netherlands) Arie Bos	0,714	(Portugal) Alfredo Ferraz	0,574
4	1947	(Belgium) Brussels	(France) Alfred Lagache	0,773	(Belgium) René Vingerhoedt	0,756	(Spain) Claudio Puigvert	0,644
5	1948	(Spain) Madrid	(Spain) Joaquín Domingo	0,793	(France) Roger Hanoun	0,835	(Belgium) René Vingerhoedt	0,718
6	1949	(France) Angoulême	(France) Alfred Lagache	0,890	(Belgium) René Vingerhoedt	0,733	(France) Marcel Lacroix	0,634
7	1950	(Netherlands) Amsterdam	(Netherlands) Bert Wevers	0,584	(France) Bernard Siguret	0,673	(Belgium) Leonard Dessart	0,652
8	1951	(Belgium) Antwerp	(Belgium) René Vingerhoedt	0,895	(France) Alfred Lagache	0,640	(Belgium) Leonard Dessart	0,702
9	1952	(Switzerland) Lausanne	(Belgium) René Vingerhoedt	1,023	(Germany) August Tiedtke	0,807	(Netherlands) Jan Brockhuizen	0,731
10	1953	(Spain) Madrid	(Belgium) René Vingerhoedt	1,008	(Germany) August Tiedtke	0,796	(Spain) Antonio Ventura	0,680
11	1954	(Germany) Mannheim	(Belgium) René Vingerhoedt	1,190	(Germany) Walter Lütgehetmann	0,863	(Belgium) Pierre Fauconnier	0,877
12	1955	(Netherlands) Amsterdam	(Belgium) René Vingerhoedt	1,017	(Netherlands) Herman Popeijus	0,884	(Germany) Walter Lütgehetmann	0,813
13	1956	(Germany) Saarbrücken	(Belgium) René Vingerhoedt	0,831	(Germany) August Tiedtke	0,784	(Belgium) Pierre Fauconnier	0,763
14	1957/1^{*1}	(Portugal) Lisbon	(France) Bernard Siguret	0,677	(Portugal) Jaime Pimenta	0,636	(Austria) Johann Scherz	0,666
15	1957/2^{*1}	(Belgium) Antwerp	(Belgium) René Vingerhoedt	0,800	(Germany) August Tiedtke	0,815	(Belgium) Raymond Steylaerts	0,638
16	1958	(France) Cannes	(Austria) Johann Scherz	0,902	(Germany) August Tiedtke	0,863	(Belgium) René Vingerhoedt	0,946
17	1959	(Netherlands) Hilversum	(Belgium) René Vingerhoedt	1,041	(Germany) August Tiedtke	0,935	(France) Bernard Siguret	0,854
18	1960	(Germany) Düsseldorf	(Belgium) René Vingerhoedt	1,105	(Germany) August Tiedtke	0,992	(Belgium) Laurent Boulanger	0,994
19	1961	(Italy) Trieste	(Austria) Johann Scherz	1,000	(Netherlands) Henny de Ruyter	0,796	(Belgium) Raymond Ceulemans	0,928
20	1962	(Netherlands) Kaatsheuvel	(Belgium) Raymond Ceulemans	1,159	(Austria) Johann Scherz	1,015	(Netherlands) Herman Popeijus	0,890
21	1963	(Belgium) Brussels	(Belgium) Raymond Ceulemans	1,202	(Austria) Johann Scherz	1,007	(Belgium) Raymond Steylaerts	0,952
22	1964	(Denmark) Copenhagen	(Belgium) Raymond Ceulemans	1,197	(Austria) Johann Scherz	0,876	(Belgium) Raymond Steylaerts	0,843
23	1965	(Austria) Vienna	(Belgium) Raymond Ceulemans	1,160	(Austria) Johann Scherz	1,053	(France) Roger Hanoun	0,922
24	1966	(Portugal) Lisbon	(Belgium) Raymond Ceulemans	1,420	(Austria) Johann Scherz	0,872	(Netherlands) Jan Doggen	0,801
25	1967	(France) Angoulême	(Belgium) Raymond Ceulemans	1,253	(Belgium) Fernand van Barel	0,971	(Austria) Johann Scherz	0,924
26	1968	(Spain) Madrid	(Belgium) Raymond Ceulemans	1,379	(Austria) Johann Scherz	1,125	(Belgium) Laurent Boulanger	1,150
27	1969	(Netherlands) The Hague	(Belgium) Raymond Ceulemans	1,538	(Belgium) Laurent Boulanger	1,174	(Austria) Johann Scherz	1,069
28	1970	(Belgium) Tournai	(Belgium) Raymond Ceulemans	1,366	(Austria) Johann Scherz	1,010	(Germany) August Tiedtke	0,809
29	1971	(Belgium) Geel	(Belgium) Raymond Ceulemans	1,621	(Austria) Johann Scherz	1,142	(Belgium) Laurent Boulanger	1,041
30	1972	(Germany) Dortmund	(Belgium) Raymond Ceulemans	1,501	(Denmark) Peter Thøgersen	0,907	(Netherlands) Rini van Bracht	0,961
31	1973	(France) Crosne	(Belgium) Arnold de Pape	0,940	(Belgium) Ludo Dielis	0,949	(France) Roland Dufetelle	0,869
32	1974	(Belgium) Eeklo	(Belgium) Raymond Ceulemans	1,527	(Belgium) Ludo Dielis	1,111	(France) Richard Bitalis	1,019
33	1975	(Netherlands) Rotterdam	(Belgium) Raymond Ceulemans	1,406	(Netherlands) Rini van Bracht	0,982	(Belgium) Laurent Boulanger	1,274
34	1976	(Spain) Valencia	(Belgium) Raymond Ceulemans	1,563	(Belgium) Ludo Dielis	0,993	(Austria) Johann Scherz	1,091
35	1977	(Switzerland) Lausanne	(Belgium) Raymond Ceulemans	1,310	(Belgium) Ludo Dielis	1,074	(Austria) Johann Scherz	1,016
36	1978	(Denmark) Copenhagen	(Belgium) Raymond Ceulemans	1,476	(Denmark) Peter Thøgersen	1,071	(Belgium) Ludo Dielis	1,060
37	1979	(Germany) Düren	(Belgium) Raymond Ceulemans	1,369	(Austria) Johann Scherz	1,059	(France) Egidio Vierat	1,029
38	1980	(Sweden) Helsingborg	(Belgium) Raymond Ceulemans	1,571	(Austria) Johann Scherz	0,979	(Netherlands) Christ van der Smissen	1,113
39	1981	(Austria) Vienna	(Belgium) Raymond Ceulemans	1,382	(Belgium) Raymond Steylaerts	0,808	(Netherlands) Piet de Jong	0,773
40	1982	(Portugal) Porto	(Belgium) Raymond Ceulemans	1,365	(Austria) Johann Scherz	1,125	(Belgium) Ludo Dielis	1,184
41	1983	(France) Dunkirk	(Belgium) Raymond Ceulemans	1,333	(Sweden) Torbjörn Blomdahl	1,104	(France) Egidio Vierat	1,045
42	1984	(Belgium) Leuven	(Netherlands) Rini van Bracht	1,193	(France) Egidio Vierat	0,978	(Germany) Günter Siebert	1,054
43	1985	(Netherlands) Amersfoort	(Sweden) Torbjörn Blomdahl	1,327	(Netherlands) Rini van Bracht	1,080	(Belgium) Raymond Ceulemans	1,262
44	1986	(Luxembourg) Mondorf-les-Bains	(Sweden) Torbjörn Blomdahl	1,218	(Spain) Avelino Rico	1,027	(Portugal) Jorge Theriaga	1,084
45	1987	(Netherlands) Waalwijk	(Belgium) Raymond Ceulemans	1,411	(Sweden) Torbjörn Blomdahl	1,261	(Belgium) Ludo Dielis	1,156
46	1988	(Denmark) Vejle	(Sweden) Torbjörn Blomdahl	1,506	(Belgium) Raymond Ceulemans	1,476	(Netherlands) Christ van der Smissen	1,202
47	1989	(Germany) Viersen	(Sweden) Lennart Blomdahl	1,099	(France) Richard Bitalis	1,324	(Sweden) Torbjörn Blomdahl	1,225
48	1990	(Sweden) Norrköping	(Sweden) Torbjörn Blomdahl	1,435	(Netherlands) Dick Jaspers	1,389	(Belgium) Paul Stroobants	1,158
49	1991	(Netherlands) Dordrecht	(Sweden) Torbjörn Blomdahl	1,772	(Netherlands) Dick Jaspers	1,513	(Belgium) Raymond Ceulemans	1,808
55	1992	(Egypt) Cairo	(Belgium) Raymond Ceulemans	1,293	(France) Francis Connesson	1,232	(Italy) Marco Zanetti	1,135
51	1993	(France) Corbeil-Essonnes	(Netherlands) Rini van Bracht	1,231	(Germany) Maximo Aguirre	0,958	(Belgium) Paul Stroobants	1,213
52	1994	(Denmark) Odense	(Netherlands) John Tijssens	1,097	(Austria) Andreas Efler	0,996	(Denmark) Dion Nelin	1,231
No.	Year	Venue	Winner	GA	Runner-up	GA	Semifinalists	GA
53	1995	(Czech Republic) Prague	(Belgium) Jozef Philipoom	1,203	(Denmark) Hans Laursen	1,083	(Portugal) Jorge Theriaga (Netherlands) John Tijssens	1,151; 1,050
54	1997	(Luxembourg) Mondorf-les-Bains	(Spain) Daniel Sánchez	1,579	(France) Jean-Christophe Roux	1,311	(Denmark) Dion Nelin (Belgium) Peter de Backer	1,353; 1,171
55	1998	(France) Aubagne	(Sweden) Torbjörn Blomdahl	1,429	(Germany) Martin Horn	1,378	(Netherlands) Dick Jaspers (Spain) Daniel Sánchez	1,583; 1,524
56	1999	(Portugal) Porto	(Turkey) Semih Saygıner	1,571	(Denmark) Dion Nelin	1,355	(Portugal) Jorge Theriaga (Netherlands) Dick Jaspers	1,333; 1,448
57	2000	(Spain) Madrid	(Spain) Daniel Sánchez	1,544	(Turkey) Semih Saygıner	1,568	(Belgium) Eddy Leppens (Netherlands) Raimond Burgman	1,285; 1,200
58	2001	(Denmark) Odense	(Sweden) Torbjörn Blomdahl	2,235	(Denmark) Tonny Carlsen	1,326	(Denmark) Dion Nelin (Netherlands) Dick Jaspers	1,447; 1,839
59	2002	(Turkey) İzmir	(Belgium) Frédéric Caudron	1,730	(Denmark) Tonny Carlsen	1,497	(Sweden) Torbjörn Blomdahl (Denmark) Jacob Haack Sørensen	1,481; 1,397
60	2003	(Turkey) Göynük	(Netherlands) Dick Jaspers	1,834	(Belgium) Frédéric Caudron	1,864	(Italy) Marco Zanetti (Germany) Martin Horn	1,984; 1,468
61	2004	(Turkey) Ölüdeniz	(Turkey) Murat Naci Çoklu	1,652	(Germany) Martin Horn	1,358	(Sweden) Torbjörn Blomdahl (Spain) Daniel Sánchez	1,669; 1,493
62	2005	(Portugal) Porto	(Sweden) Torbjörn Blomdahl	1,643	(Belgium) Frédéric Caudron	1,333	(Netherlands) Dick Jaspers (Denmark) Brian Knudsen	1,920; 1,413
63	2006	(Turkey) Antalya	(Belgium) Frédéric Caudron	1,937	(Turkey) Semih Saygıner	1,922	(Spain) Daniel Sánchez (Netherlands) Dick Jaspers	1,772; 1,698
64	2007	(France) Salon-de-Provence	(Belgium) Eddy Merckx	1,714	(Belgium) Frédéric Caudron	1,962	(Spain) Daniel Sánchez (Netherlands) Dick Jaspers	1,608; 1,860
65	2008	(France) Florange	(Netherlands) Dick Jaspers	2,169	(Sweden) Torbjörn Blomdahl	1,557	(Italy) Marco Zanetti (Belgium) Roland Forthomme	1,317; 1,391
66	2009	(Denmark) Odense	(Spain) Daniel Sánchez	1,864	(Belgium) Frédéric Caudron	1,760	(Sweden) Torbjörn Blomdahl (Turkey) Tayfun Taşdemir	1,529; 1,388
67	2010	(Germany) Sankt Wendel	(Netherlands) Dick Jaspers	2,168	(Belgium) Eddy Merckx	1,581	(Italy) Marco Zanetti (Turkey) Tayfun Taşdemir	2,007; 1,428
68	2011	(Portugal) Porto	(Netherlands) Dick Jaspers	1,715	(Belgium) Eddy Merckx	1,518	(Sweden) Torbjörn Blomdahl (Belgium) Frédéric Caudron	1,655; 1,631
69	2012	(Turkey) Istanbul	(Greece) Filippos Kasidokostas	1,798	(Netherlands) Raimond Burgman	1,465	(Germany) Martin Horn (Turkey) Murat Naci Çoklu	1,682; 1,587
70	2013	(Germany) Brandenburg/Havel	(Italy) Marco Zanetti	2,500^{*2}	(Germany) Christian Rudolph	1,465	(Belgium) Frédéric Caudron (Netherlands) Glenn Hofman	1,869; 1,059
71	2015	(Germany) Brandenburg/Havel	(Sweden) Torbjörn Blomdahl	1,739	(Belgium) Eddy Merckx	2,417	(Netherlands) Dick Jaspers (Turkey) Adnan Yüksel	1.646; 1,405
72	2017	(Germany) Brandenburg/Havel	(Italy) Marco Zanetti	1.980	(Belgium) Frédéric Caudron	1.933	(Netherlands) Dick Jaspers (Spain) David Martínez	1.807; 1.366
73	2019	(Germany) Brandenburg/Havel	(Netherlands) Dick Jaspers	2.352	(Italy) Marco Zanetti	1.948	(Turkey) Murat Naci Coklu (Spain) Rubén Legazpi	1.873; 1.666
74	2022	(Netherlands) Berlicum	(Spain) Daniel Sánchez	2.192	(Netherlands) Dick Jaspers	2,373	(Turkey) Semih Saygıner (Germany) Martin Horn	2,127; 1.828
75	2023	(Turkey) Ankara	(Italy) Marco Zanetti	1.953	(Turkey) Berkay Karakurt	1.605	(Spain) Daniel Sánchez (Sweden) Torbjörn Blomdahl	1.736; 1.429
76	2024	(Turkey) Antalya	(Sweden) Torbjörn Blomdahl	1.644	(Germany) Martin Horn	1.493	(Spain) Rubén Legazpi (Netherlands) Jeffrey Jorissen	1.707; 1.429
77	2025	(Turkey) Antalya	(Germany) Martin Horn	2.032	(Belgium) Roland Forthomme	1.446	(Belgium) Eddy Merckx (Netherlands) Jeffrey Jorissen	1.695; 1.567
78	2026	(Turkey) Antalya	(Belgium) Peter Ceulemans	2.000	(Belgium) Eddy Merckx	1.605	(Germany) Martin Horn (Turkey) Tayfun Taşdemir	1.461; 1.047

Note

- ^{*1} Since there were two competing and fractious associations at that time, namely, Union Internationale des Fédérations d'Amateurs de Billard (UIFAB) und Fédération Internationale de Billard (FIB), two different championships were held. Since the players could only affiliate to one of the associations, there was no overlapping of the participants of the respective European Championship.
- ^{*2} New European record

== Medals (1932-2023) ==
Rank	Nation	Gold	Silver	Bronze	Total
1	Belgium	37	18	27	82
2	Sweden	10	3	6	19
3	Netherlands	9	10	18	37
4	France	5	8	7	20
5	Spain	5	1	10	16
6	Italy	3	1	4	8
7	Austria	2	11	5	18
8	Turkey	2	3	6	11
9	Switzerland	1	1	0	2
10	Greece	1	0	0	1
11	Germany	0	12	6	18
12	Denmark	0	6	5	11
13	Portugal	0	1	4	5
Totals (13 entries)		75	75	98	248

== See also ==
- UMB World Three-cushion Championship
- Cue sports at the World Games
