= Filippos Kasidokostas =

Greek professional three-cushion billiards player

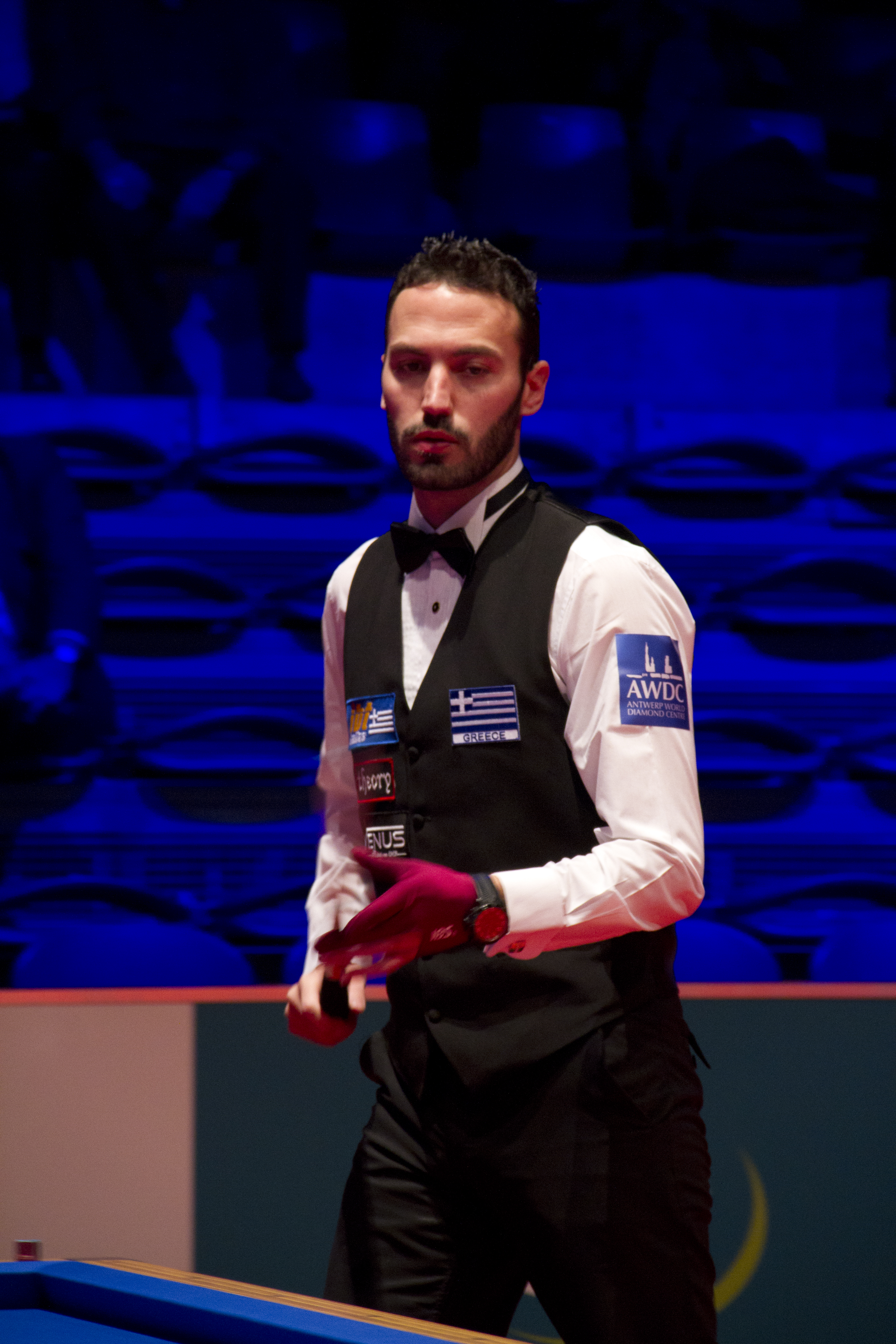
- Filippos Kasidokostas (GRC)

Medal record

Representing Greece

Men's Three-cushion billiards

UMB World Three-cushion Championship
| Silver medal – second place | 2003 World Three-cushion Championship | Individual |
| Silver medal – second place | 2004 World Three-cushion Championship | Individual |
| Gold medal – first place | 2009 World Three-cushion Championship | Individual |
| Silver medal – second place | 2013 World Three-cushion Championship | Individual |

World Three-cushion Championship Juniors
| Gold medal – first place | 2001 World Three-cushion Championship Juniors | Individual |
| Gold medal – first place | 2002 World Three-cushion Championship Juniors | Individual |
| Gold medal – first place | 2003 World Three-cushion Championship Juniors | Individual |

CEB European Three-cushion Championship
| Gold medal – first place | 2012 European Three-cushion Championship | Individual |

European Three-cushion Championship Juniors
| Bronze medal – third place | 2001 European Three-cushion Championship Juniors | Individual |
| Silver medal – second place | 2002 European Three-cushion Championship Juniors | Individual |
| Gold medal – first place | 2004 European Three-cushion Championship Juniors | Individual |

2013 AGIPI Billiard Masters
| Bronze medal – third place | 2011 AGIPI Billiard Masters | Individual |

Crystal Kelly Cup
| Gold medal – first place | 2011 Crystal Kelly Cup | Individual |

World Cup
| Gold medal – first place | 2010 World Cup | Individual |
| Silver medal – second place | 2010 World Cup | Individual |
| Bronze medal – third place | 2010 World Cup | Individual |
| Bronze medal – third place | 2011 World Cup | Individual |
| Bronze medal – third place | 2013 World Cup | Individual |
| Bronze medal – third place | 2013 World Cup | Individual |

Filippos Kasidokostas (born 14 November 1983) is a Greek professional three-cushion billiards player.
