= Dani Sánchez (billiards player) =

Spanish billiards player (born 1974)

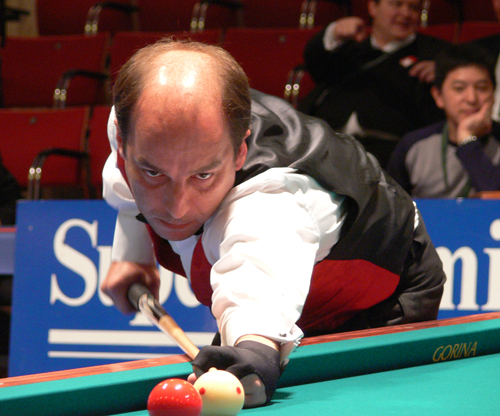
- Sánchez in 2012

Medal record

Men's three-cushion billiards

Representing Spain

UMB World Championship
Gold medal – first place	1998	Individual
Gold medal – first place	2005	Individual
Gold medal – first place	2010	Individual
Gold medal – first place	2016	Individual
Silver medal – second place	1996	Individual
Silver medal – second place	2007	Individual

World Cup
Gold medal – first place	1995	Individual
Gold medal – first place	2004	Individual
Gold medal – first place	2006	Individual
Gold medal – first place	2015	Individual

CEB European Championship
Gold medal – first place	1997	Individual
Gold medal – first place	2000	Individual
Bronze medal – third place	2006	Individual
Bronze medal – third place	2007	Individual

World Games
Gold medal – first place	2001 Akita	Individual
Gold medal – first place	2005 Duisburg	Individual
Gold medal – first place	2017 Wrocław	Individual

Daniel Sánchez Gálvez (born 3 March 1974 in Santa Coloma de Gramenet, and best known as Dani Sánchez) is a Spanish professional carom billiards player who plays for FC Porto a club he has represented for the last 21 years.

== Career ==
He first reached the finals of the UMB World Three-cushion Championship in 1996, but finished 2nd to Christian Rudolph. He successfully took the title in 1998, defeating 17-time World Champion Torbjörn Blomdahl. He won it again in 2005 against Jean Paul de Bruijn, in 2010 against Eddy Leppens and in 2016 against Kim Haeng-jik.

Sánchez is a winner of the CEB European Three-cushion Championship twice (1997 and 2000) and is a 31-time Spanish national Champion. He is 15-time Three-cushion Billiard champion of Spain.

He also won three gold medals at The World Games in three-cushion in 2001, 2005 and 2017, defeating Dick Jaspers on the first two occasions and Marco Zanetti at the latest edition. By 2015 he won his fifth Overall-World Cup title.

== Records ==
His highest run (HR) in competition is 23 (2016 Spanish Championship) which is also the new Spanish record, and his best game average is 5 (50 points in 10 innings). By 2016 he is the 18-time National Champion with two records, beside the high-run he also put up the general average (GA) record up to 2.247.

Preceded by none	World Games – Three-cushion Champion; 2001, 2005, 2017	Succeeded by Dick Jaspers
