= Frédéric Caudron =

Belgian billiards player (born 1968)

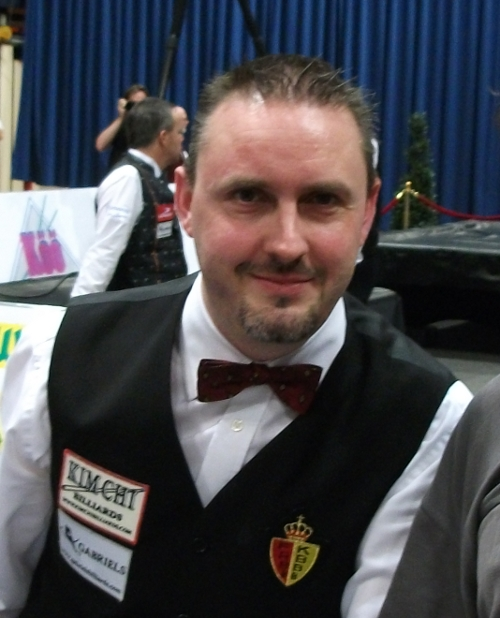

Medal record

Representing Belgium

Men's Three-cushion billiards

UMB World Three-cushion Championship
Gold medal – first place	1999 World Three-cushion Championship	Individual
Gold medal – first place	2013 World Three-cushion Championship	Individual
Bronze medal – third place	2012 World Three-cushion Championship	Individual
Gold medal – first place	2017 World Three-cushion Championship	Individual
Gold medal – first place	2025 World Three-cushion Championship	Individual

Three-Cushion World Cup
Gold medal – first place	2005 World Cup Three-cushion	Individual
Gold medal – first place	2009 World Cup Three-cushion	Individual
Gold medal – first place	2014 World Cup Three-cushion	Individual
Gold medal – first place	2018 World Cup Three-cushion	Individual

UMB World Three-cushion Championship for National Teams
Silver medal – second place	2004 World Three-cushion Championship for National Teams	Team
Gold medal – first place	2012 World Three-cushion Championship for National Teams	Team
Gold medal – first place	2013 World Three-cushion Championship for National Teams	Team

CEB European Three-cushion Championship
Gold medal – first place	2002 European Three-cushion Championship	Individual
Silver medal – second place	2003 European Three-cushion Championship	Individual
Silver medal – second place	2005 European Three-cushion Championship	Individual
Gold medal – first place	2006 European Three-cushion Championship	Individual
Silver medal – second place	2007 European Three-cushion Championship	Individual
Silver medal – second place	2009 European Three-cushion Championship	Individual
Bronze medal – third place	2011 European Three-cushion Championship	Individual

Crystal Kelly Cup
Bronze medal – third place	1994 Crystal Kelly Cup	Individual
Gold medal – first place	1998 Crystal Kelly Cup	Individual
Bronze medal – third place	2000 Crystal Kelly Cup	Individual
Silver medal – second place	2002 Crystal Kelly Cup	Individual
Bronze medal – third place	2003 Crystal Kelly Cup	Individual
Bronze medal – third place	2006 Crystal Kelly Cup	Individual
Gold medal – first place	2008 Crystal Kelly Cup	Individual
Gold medal – first place	2009 Crystal Kelly Cup	Individual

Sang Lee International Open
Gold medal – first place	2006 Sang Lee International Open	Individual
Gold medal – first place	2007 Sang Lee International Open	Individual
Silver medal – second place	2008 Sang Lee International Open	Individual

Men's One-cushion billiards

European One-cushion Championship
Gold medal – first place	1990 European One-cushion Championship	Individual
Gold medal – first place	1991 European One-cushion Championship	Individual
Gold medal – first place	1993 European One-cushion Championship	Individual
Silver medal – second place	1995 European One-cushion Championship	Individual
Bronze medal – third place	1998 European One-cushion Championship	Individual
Gold medal – first place	2008 European One-cushion Championship	Individual
Bronze medal – third place	2007 European One-cushion Championship	Individual
Gold medal – first place	2009 European One-cushion Championship	Individual
Gold medal – first place	2011 European One-cushion Championship	Individual
Gold medal – first place	2012 European One-cushion Championship	Individual

Men's Balkline billiards

Balkline World Championship
Gold medal – first place	1991 Balkline 71/2 World Championship	Individual
Silver medal – second place	1993 Balkline 71/2 World Championship	Individual
Gold medal – first place	2000 Balkline 71/2 World Championship	Individual
Gold medal – first place	2003 Balkline 47/2 World Championship	Individual

Balkline European Championship
Bronze medal – third place	1989 Balkline 71/2 European Championship	Individual
Silver medal – second place	1990 Balkline 71/2 European Championship	Individual
Gold medal – first place	1991 Balkline 71/2 European Championship	Individual
Silver medal – second place	1991 Balkline 47/2 European Championship	Individual
Silver medal – second place	1992 Balkline 47/1 European Championship	Individual
Bronze medal – third place	1993 Balkline 47/1 European Championship	Individual
Gold medal – first place	2004 Balkline 47/1 European Championship	Individual
Gold medal – first place	2009 Balkline 47/2 European Championship	Individual
Bronze medal – third place	2011 Balkline 47/2 European Championship	Individual

Frédéric Caudron (born 27 January 1968 in Mons, Belgium) is a Belgian professional three-cushion billiards player, nicknamed "L'Extraterrestre" ("The Extraterrestrial"). He won the UMB World Three-cushion Championship in 1999, 2013, 2017 and 2025. He also won the Sang Lee International Open two consecutive times (2006 and 2007), the CEB European Championship twice (2002 and 2006), as well as 53 Belgian national titles. His highest three cushions run is 28 (15 April 2013 Brandenburg, GERMANY) and his best game average is 6.666 (40 points in 6 innings).
