= Dick Jaspers =

Dutch carom billiards player

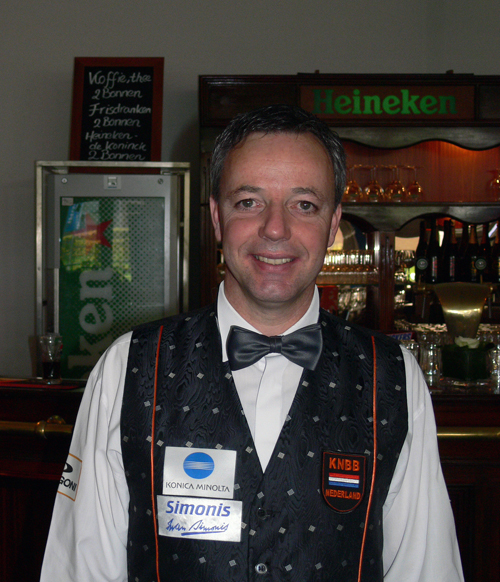

Personal information
- Born: 23 July 1965 (age 61) Sint Willebrord

Sport
- Country: Netherlands
- Sport: Snooker
- Professional: 1986
Medal record
Men's Three-cushion billiards
Representing Netherlands
UMB World Championship
Bronze medal – third place	1999 Bogotá	Individual
Gold medal – first place	2000 Saint-Étienne	Individual
Bronze medal – third place	2002 Randers	Individual
Gold medal – first place	2004 Rotterdam	Individual
Bronze medal – third place	2006 Sankt Wendel	Individual
Bronze medal – third place	2007 Cuenca	Individual
Gold medal – first place	2011 Lima	Individual
Bronze medal – third place	2013 Antwerp	Individual
Gold medal – first place	2018 Caïro	Individual
Gold medal – first place	2021 Sharm el-Sheikh	Individual
World Cup
Gold medal – first place	1997	Individual
Gold medal – first place	1999	Individual
Gold medal – first place	2008	Individual
Gold medal – first place	2010	Individual
Gold medal – first place	2016	Individual
Gold medal – first place	2019	Individual
CEB European Championship
Silver medal – second place	1990 Norrköping	Individual
Silver medal – second place	1991 Dordrecht	Individual
Bronze medal – third place	1998 Aubagne	Individual
Bronze medal – third place	1999 Porto	Individual
Bronze medal – third place	2001 Odense	Individual
Gold medal – first place	2003 Göynük	Individual
Bronze medal – third place	2005 Porto	Individual
Bronze medal – third place	2006 Antalya	Individual
Bronze medal – third place	2007 Salon-de-Provence	Individual
Gold medal – first place	2008 Florange	Individual
Gold medal – first place	2010 Sankt Wendel	Individual
Gold medal – first place	2011 Porto	Individual
Gold medal – first place	2019 Brandenburg	Individual
World Team Championship
Silver medal – second place	1993 Viersen	Team
Gold medal – first place	1998 Viersen	Team
Gold medal – first place	1999 Viersen	Team
Silver medal – second place	2000 Viersen	Team
Silver medal – second place	2002 Viersen	Team
Bronze medal – third place	2003 Viersen	Team
Silver medal – second place	2005 Viersen	Team
Bronze medal – third place	2006 Viersen	Team
Bronze medal – third place	2007 Viersen	Team
Silver medal – second place	2008 Viersen	Team
Bronze medal – third place	2010 Viersen	Team
Bronze medal – third place	2011 Viersen	Team
World Games
Silver medal – second place	2001 Akita	Individual
Silver medal – second place	2005 Duisburg	Individual
Gold medal – first place	2009 Kaohsiung	Individual
Gold medal – first place	2022 Birmingham	Individual

Dingeman Jacobus Johannes "Dick" Jaspers (pronounced yas-pers) (born 23 July 1965) is a Dutch professional carom billiards player who specializes in the three-cushion event.

== Early life ==
Jaspers started playing billiards when he was three years old in the pub his parents ran in his home town. Between 1974 and 1980 he participated in the Dutch Youth Championships before making the move to the senior level. In this period he got lessons from Andre Gulickx and Tony Schrauwen

== Professional career ==
Jaspers became a professional billiard player in 1986 after seeing Raymond Ceulemans and Nobuaki Kobayashi on live television during their World Cup final in Valkenburg. Jaspers won two silver medals in the Dutch Championships 1986. In 1987 and 1989 he won the National Championship, and participated three times at the European Youth Championship. He won the gold medal on all of those occasions.

Jaspers started playing in the West German division of the Billiards World Cup Association (BWA) which managed professional Grand–Prix tournaments. Jaspers won several of these tournaments and was later suspended by the Confédération Européenne de Billard (CEB) for five years for his participation. Several other world–class players received the same suspension. The Union Mondiale de Billard supported this decision and Jaspers and the other players were prohibited from participating in European and World Championships for five years. Following the suspension, the players remained members of the BWA and played all their tournaments with them, which resulted in a long–term suspension. In 1989 and 1992, Jaspers became European Champion at the European Nation Championships, and in 1991 and 1992 he won the Finals of the Coupe d'Europe events. In 1998, the associations and their players came together to resolve their differences. From then on the players were able to play at the ECs and WCs again. Jaspers won the Three-Cushion World Cup in 1997 and 1999, and received the Golden KNBB Pin in December 1999.

In October 2000, Jaspers dominated the UMB World Three-cushion Championship. Earlier that year he was honored by the BWA. He was not able to defend his title the following year, but he won the silver medal at the 2001 World Games in Akita, Japan.

In Göynük, Turkey, he won the 2003 European Championships and he became UMB World Champion for the second time in 2004 when he defeated his Greek opponent Filippos Kasidokostas in the final (15–9, 15–0, 15–5). The event was held in Jaspers' home country in Rotterdam. Jaspers would win that event again five years later by defeating Torbjörn Blomdahl.

In 2005, Jaspers won three Silver Medals (World Games, World Nations Championships and Euro Billiards). On 3 September 2006, Jaspers won his 13th Dutch National Championship event.

Jaspers defeated Blomdahl again to win the 2009 AGIPI Billiard Masters. A prize of €20,550 was awarded to him.

== Titles ==
- 1997 Three-Cushion World Cup Champion
- 1999 Three-Cushion World Cup Champion
- 2000 UMB World Three-cushion Champion
- 2003 CEB European Three-cushion Champion
- 2004 UMB World Three-cushion Champion
- 2008 CEB European Three-cushion Champion
- 2008 Three-Cushion World Cup Champion
- 2009 UMB/CEB AGIPI Masters
- 2010 CEB European Three-cushion Champion
- 2010 UMB/CEB AGIPI Masters
- 2010 Three-Cushion World Cup Champion
- 2011 CEB European Three-cushion Champion
- 2011 UMB World Three-cushion Champion
- 2016 Three-Cushion World Cup Champion

Reference of results

=== World records ===
- Three–cushion average in a single 1–set 40–carambole match: 10 (4 innings, 5+11+2+22 = 40 points) (2017)
- Three–cushion average in a single 3–set 45–carambole match: 5.625 (45/8) (2008)
- Most points in a row: 34 over 3 sets (2008, see below)
- Three–cushion average in a tournament: 2.536 over 7 matches (2002) and 2.666 over 4 matches (2005)

In the 2008 European Championship Final against Torbjorn Blomdahl, Jaspers averaged 5.625. He ended Game One by going 13 and out in his second innings, ran 15 and out in his first innings of Game Two and ran six in his first innings of Game Three. Thus, he made 34 consecutive points.

Preceded by Torbjörn Blomdahl	Three-Cushion World Cup Champion; 1997	Succeeded by Torbjörn Blomdahl
Preceded by Torbjörn Blomdahl	Three-Cushion World Cup Champion; 1999	Succeeded by Torbjörn Blomdahl
Preceded by Torbjörn Blomdahl	Three-Cushion World Cup Champion; 2008	Succeeded by Frédéric Caudron
Preceded by Frédéric Caudron	Three-Cushion World Cup Champion; 2010	Succeeded by Torbjörn Blomdahl
Preceded by Dani Sánchez	World Games – Three-cushion Champion; 2009	Succeeded by Incumbent
