= Torbjörn Blomdahl =

Swedish billiards player

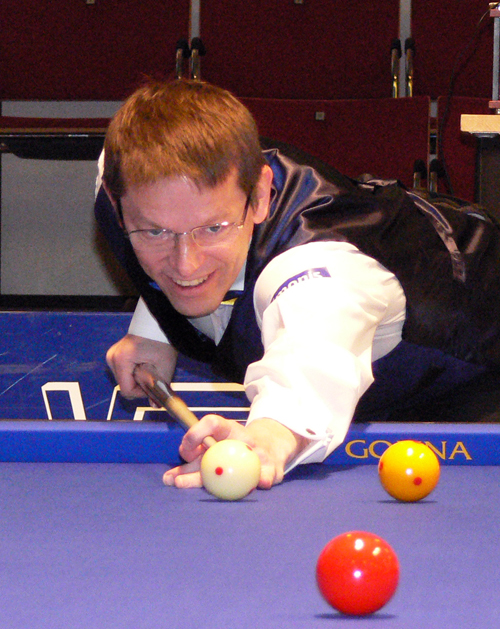

Medal record

Men's three-cushion billiards

Representing Sweden

UMB World Championship
Gold medal – first place	1987 Cairo	Three-cushion
Gold medal – first place	1988 Tokyo	Three-cushion
Gold medal – first place	1991 Tokyo	Three-cushion
Gold medal – first place	1992 Palma	Three-cushion
Gold medal – first place	1997 Grubbenvorst	Three-cushion
Gold medal – first place	2015 Bordeaux	Three-cushion
Gold medal – first place	2019 Randers	Three-cushion
Silver medal – second place	1986 Las Vegas	Three-cushion
Silver medal – second place	1989 Yokohama	Three-cushion
Silver medal – second place	1990 Tokyo	Three-cushion
Silver medal – second place	1993 Gent	Three-cushion
Silver medal – second place	1998 Rezé	Three-cushion
Silver medal – second place	1999 Bogotá	Three-cushion
Silver medal – second place	2008 Sankt Wendel	Three-cushion
Silver medal – second place	2014 Seoul	Three-cushion
Bronze medal – third place	2003 Valladolid	Three-cushion

World Cup
Gold medal – first place	1994 World Cup	Three-cushion
Gold medal – first place	1995 World Cup	Three-cushion
Gold medal – first place	1996 World Cup	Three-cushion
Gold medal – first place	1998 World Cup	Three-cushion
Gold medal – first place	2001 World Cup	Three-cushion
Gold medal – first place	2007 World Cup	Three-cushion
Gold medal – first place	2011 World Cup	Three-cushion
Gold medal – first place	2013 World Cup	Three-cushion

CEB European Championship
Gold medal – first place	1985 Amersfoort	Three-cushion
Gold medal – first place	1986 Mondorf-les-Bains	Three-cushion
Gold medal – first place	1988 Vejle	Three-cushion
Gold medal – first place	1990 Norrköping	Three-cushion
Gold medal – first place	1991 Dordrecht	Three-cushion
Gold medal – first place	1998 Aubagne	Three-cushion
Gold medal – first place	2001 Odense	Three-cushion
Gold medal – first place	2005 Porto	Three-cushion
Gold medal – first place	2015 Brandenbutg	Three-cushion
Gold medal – first place	2024 Ankara	Three-cushion
Silver medal – second place	1983 Dunkirk	Three-cushion
Silver medal – second place	1987 Waalwijk	Three-cushion
Silver medal – second place	2008 Florange	Three-cushion
Bronze medal – third place	1989 Viersen	Three-cushion
Bronze medal – third place	2002 Izmir	Three-cushion
Bronze medal – third place	2004 Ölüdeniz	Three-cushion
Bronze medal – third place	2009 Odense	Three-cushion
Bronze medal – third place	2011 Porto	Three-cushion

World Games
Silver medal – second place	2009 Kaohsiung	Individual

Torbjörn Blomdahl (born 26 October 1962 in Gothenburg) is a Swedish professional carom billiards (and to a lesser extent pool) player from Helsingborg, Sweden who plays for FC Porto. He is a seven time World Champion in three-cushion billiards, having won the titles in 1987, 1988, 1991, 1992, 1997, 2015 and in 2019.

== Background ==
Torbjörn Blomdahl was born in Gothenburg but at age 11 he moved to Helsingborg. He is the son of three-cushion player Lennart Blomdahl, who was a driving force behind the local billiards club Borgen på Söder. It was here Blomdahl learned to play three-cushion with his father as the teacher. His international breakthrough was at the European championships in Copenhagen in 1984. Starting in 1989 he was ranked the best three-cushion player in the world.

Blomdahl has been a resident of Backnang, Germany since 1994.

== Cue sports career ==
Blomdahl has won a total of 7 world UMB three-cushion world titles, placing him second to only Raymond Ceulemans who won 21. He is also the only Swede to ever be world champion. He's made 6 successful defenses, won 8 CEB European three-cushion titles which he defended successfully 4 times, and won 18 Swedish titles. His highest run is 26 and once made 50 points in 9 innings (5.555 average).

Other tournaments Blomdahl won include the 2004 Carom Café International Tournament against Ramon Rodriguez and the first Sang Lee International Open, in 2005, by defeating Turkey's Semih Saygıner. In 2008 Blomdahl won the money-rich Agipi Masters tournament at the expense of Dick Jaspers.

Blomdahl has also excelled at pocket billiards, once defeating Korean pro Young Hwa-jeong and Filipino pro pool player Efren Reyes in both three-cushion, nine ball, and eight ball. He's also run 100 in straight pool.
