= Three-cushion billiards =

Form of carom billiards

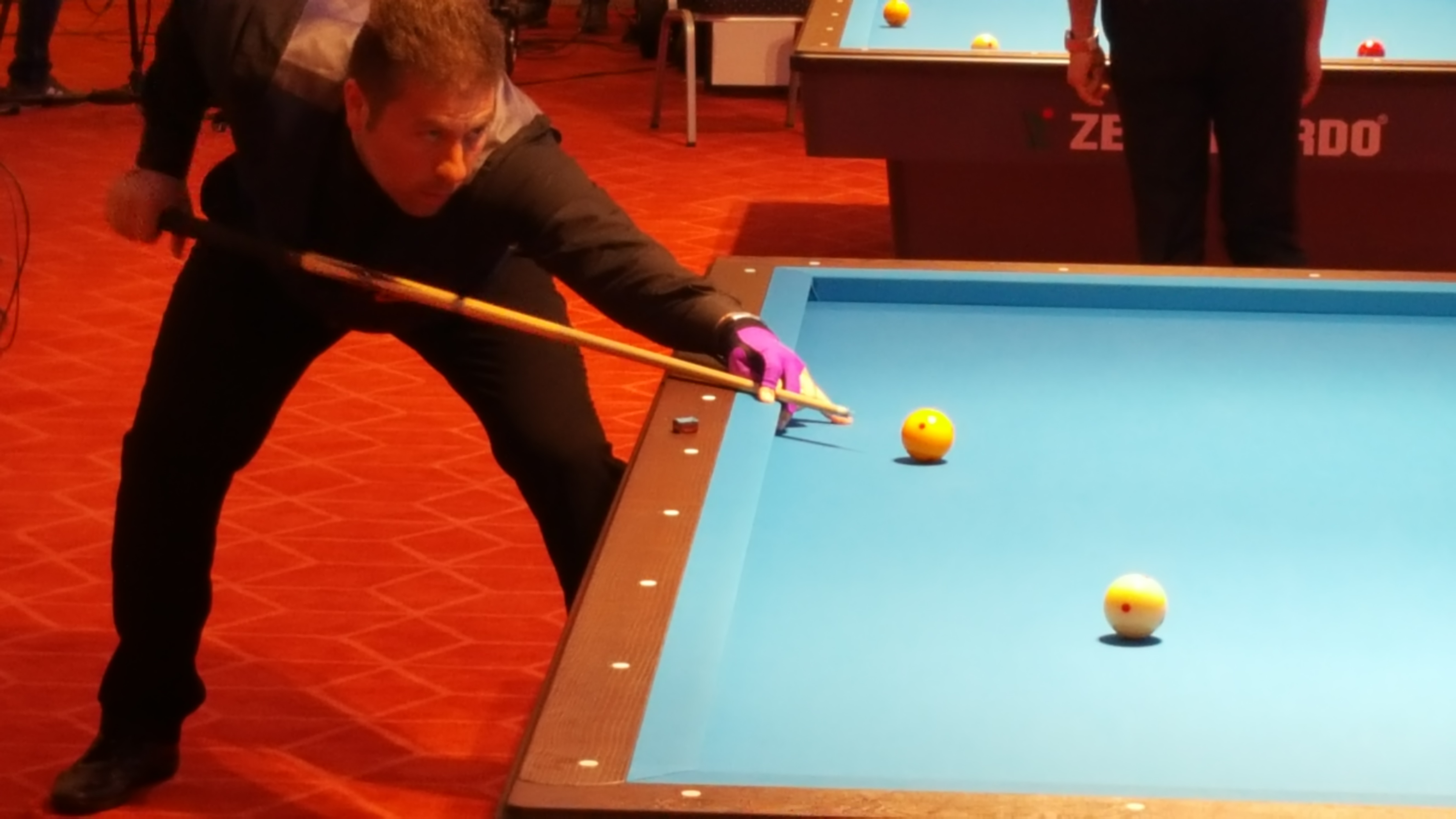
- Three-Cushion World Cup game
- Highest governing body: Union Mondiale de Billard (UMB)
- Nicknames: 3-cushion

Characteristics
- Contact: No
- Team members: Individual
- Type: Cue sports
- Equipment: Cue stick, billiard balls, billiard table
- Venue: Billiard hall

Presence
- Olympic: no
- World Games: Yes (three-cushion billiards) 2001 – present

Three-cushion billiards, also called three-cushion carom, is a form of carom billiards. The object of the game is to carom the cue ball off both object balls while contacting the rail cushions at least three times before contacting the second object ball. A point is scored for each successful carom. In most shots the cue ball hits the object balls one time each, although hitting them any number of times is allowed as long as both are hit. The cue ball may contact the cushions before or after hitting the first object ball. It does not have to contact three different cushions as long as it has been in contact with any cushion at least three times in total.

== History ==
Three-cushion dates to the 1870s, and while the origin of the game is not entirely known, it evolved from one-cushion billiards, which in turn developed from straight rail billiards for the same reason that balkline also arose from straight rail. Such new developments made the game more challenging, less repetitive, and more interesting for spectators as well as players, by thwarting the ability of highly skilled players to rack up point after point at will by relying on nurse shots.

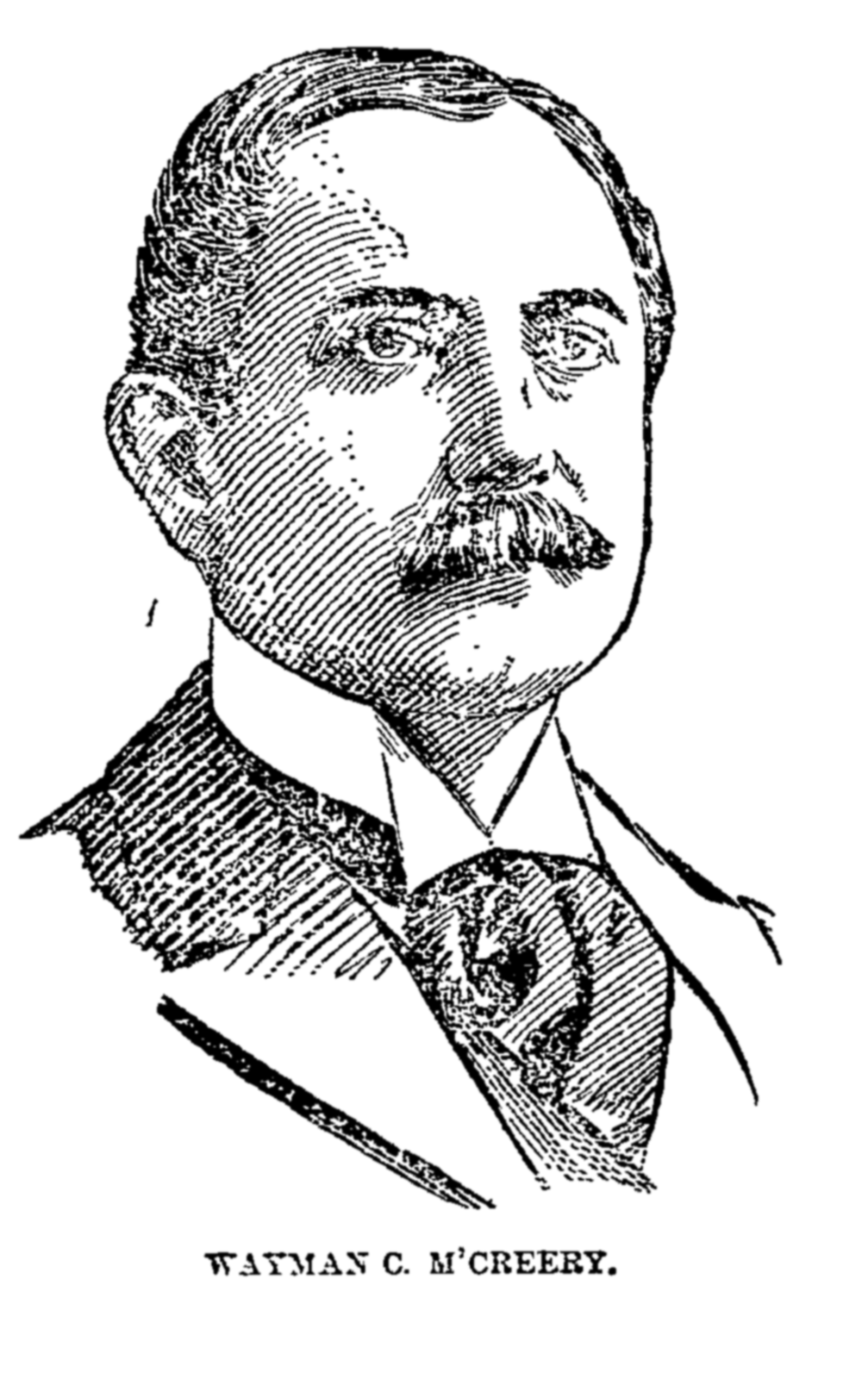
Wayman C. McCreery, popularizer and possible inventor of three-cushion billiards

Wayman Crow McCreery, the Internal Revenue Collector of the Port of St. Louis, Missouri, born June 14, 1851, in St. Louis, popularized the game. At least one publication categorically states he invented the game as well.

The first three-cushion billiards tournament took place January 14–31, 1878 in C. E. Mussey's billiard room in St. Louis, with McCreery a participant. The tournament was won by New Yorker Leon Magnus. The high run for the tournament was just 6 points, and the high average a .75. The game was infrequently played prior to 1907, with top carom players of the era voicing their dislike of it. However, after the introduction of the Lambert Trophy in 1907, the game became increasingly popular both in the United States and internationally.

By 1924, three-cushion had become so popular that two giants in other cue sport disciplines agreed to take up the game especially for a challenge match. On September 22, 1924 Willie Hoppe, the world's balkline champion (who later took up three-cushion with a passion), and Ralph Greenleaf, the world's straight pool title holder, played a well advertised, multi-day match to 600 points. Hoppe was the eventual winner with a final score of 600–527. The game's decline in the United States began in 1952 when Hoppe, then 51-time billiards champion, announced his retirement. Over time, three-cushion completely supplanted balkline billiards, once the world championship carom game.

Three-cushion retains popularity in parts of Europe, Asia, and Latin America. The game's slow resurgence in United States popularity is due in part to the introduction of the Sang Lee International Open tournament in Flushing, New York, in 2005, with first-place prize money up to US$25,000. The game has also seen increased coverage in cue sports publications based in the United States, such as Billiards Digest and Pool & Billiard Magazine.

== Records ==
Three-cushion billiards is a difficult game. Averaging one point per inning is usually national-level play, and averaging 1.5 or more is world-class play. An average of 1 means that for every turn at the table, a player point success rate is 50%. An average of 2 means a success rate of roughly 67%.

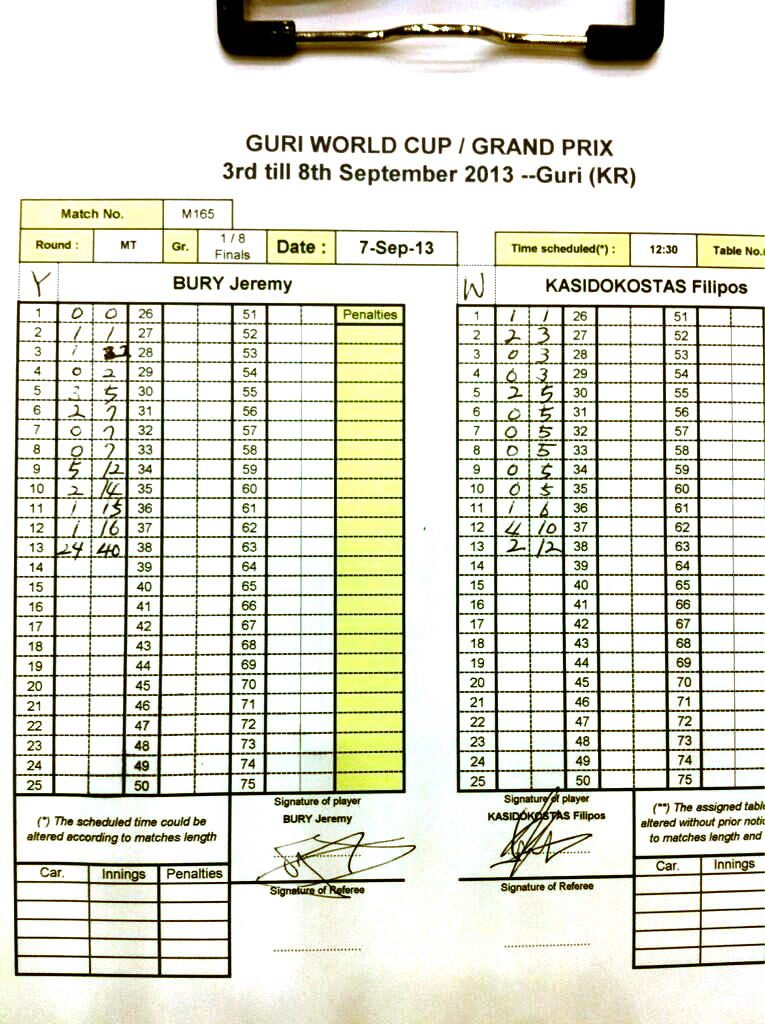
Result sheet of Jérémy Bury's run of 24

The high run at three-cushion billiards for many years was 25, set over two games (fourteen and out and starting with eleven in the next game) by the American Willie Hoppe in 1918 during an exhibition in San Francisco. In 1968 Raymond Ceulemans improved the record to 26 in a match in the Simonis Cup tournament. In 1993 Junichi Komori set the record to 28 in a Dutch league match, a feat repeated by Ceulemans in 1998 in the same league. In 2012 Roland Forthomme tied the record in Zundert. In the 2013 European Championships in Brandenburg, Germany, Frederic Caudron became the fourth member of the "28" club. Ceulemans reputedly had a high run of 32 in a non-tournament, non-exhibition match. The highest run so far in a World Cup match is 26, set by Torbjorn Blomdahl on 26 May 2023 in Ho Chi Minh City, Vietnam. When allowing for interruptions by opponents starting new games, the current record high run is 34 by the Dutchman Dick Jaspers: in his 2008 European Championship Final match against the Swede Torbjörn Blomdahl, played in three games of 15 points each, he ended Game One by going 13 and out, ran 15 and out in the only inning of Game Two (started by Blomdahl), and ran six in his first inning of Game Three.

The best game at the standard 50 points in a league is six innings (8.333 average) by Eddy Merckx (count:4-9-26-7-0-4) in the German Bundesliga in 2011. The best such game in a tournament is nine innings (5.555 average) by Torbjörn Blomdahl in 2000, while South Korean and later U.S. national champion Sang Lee scored 50 points in four innings (count: 19-11-9-11, a 12.5 average) in a handicapped game at Sang Lee Billiards in Queens, New York.

The best tournament match average is 5.625 (45 in eight innings over three games; i.e. only five misses), scored by Dick Jaspers in the above-mentioned European Cup finals in Florange, France, in 2008. His opponent Blomdahl averaged 3.0 in his losing effort. The highest average at an international tournament is 2.537 (345 caramboles in 136 innings) by Dick Jaspers in 2002 at a seven-match Crystal Kelly tournament in Monaco, while Jaspers reached a record average of 2.666 (200 caramboles in 75 innings) at a four-match national tournament in Veldhoven in 2005.

Raymond Ceulemans from Belgium has won 21 UMB World Three-cushion Championships.

== Governing bodies ==
The principal governing body of the sport is the Union Mondiale de Billard (UMB). It had been staging world three-cushion championships since the late 1920s. It is a member organization of the World Confederation of Billiard Sports. From 1985 to 1999, the Billiards World Cup Association (BWA) organized the Three-Cushion World Cup with UMB, but later shut down due to financial problems, with UMB assuming full responsibility for the tournament.

== In popular culture ==
The game was featured in the 1959 animated Disney short film Donald in Mathmagic Land, in which Donald Duck attempts to learn the game by mastering the diamond system, which uses the diamond markings on the rails as a guide for calculating where the cue ball will strike based on player aim and cueing technique. The game also features prominently in the 2007 Goya Award-winning Spanish film Seven Billiard Tables (Siete mesas de billar francés), about a woman who inherits a troubled billiard hall and is searching for her missing husband. An opening theme for an anime of Lupin III shows Lupin and Jigen playing three-cushion billiards.

== See also ==
- UMB World Three-cushion Championship
- CEB European Three-cushion Championship
- Three-Cushion World Cup
