= Three-Cushion World Cup =

Annual international billiards tournament series

Tournament information
- Organisation(s): Union Mondiale de Billard
- Format: Round Robin / single-elimination
- Recent edition: 2026
- Current champion: (South Korea) Cho Myung-woo (2025)

The Three-Cushion World Cup is an international tournament series in three-cushion billiards, which is held every year since 1986 between three and ten times a year.

== History ==
The World Cup was founded in 1985 by German Werner Bayer, a carom billiards enthusiast and patron. He called the association "Billiards World Cup Association" (BWA) and in 1986 the first tournament was held in Paris. As a patron he had excellent contact to sponsors, and quickly the tournament grew into a popular meeting place for players and spectators. At the time, the World-Cup had one of the highest monetary prizes. Between 1986 and 1989, the prize money per tournament was approximately 100,000 DM, with the winner receiving 50,000 DM. The BWA organized the World-Cup along with the world governing body, the Union Mondiale de Billard (UMB).

Between 1988 and 1993, the UMB no longer hosted any world championships themselves, therefore, for four years, the BWA World-Cup became the default world championship. In 1994 there were disagreements between the two associations. The UMB thus blocked players, including players wives, referees and organizers who took part in the World Cup, from participating in the tournaments of the UMB and CEB (Confédération Européenne de Billard). Thus, between 1994 and 1997, there were two parallel World-Cup championships. The BWA, as usual, played for 3rd place (the only exception was the tournament 1997/7 ), whereas the UMB did not, and therefore had two 3rd-place finishers. (With few exceptions, since the acquisition of the tournament in 1999, this is the rule up to now) .

After settling the disputes, the UMB and the BWA led the tournament together until early 1999 (Berlin Cup). After 1999, Mr. Bayer withdrew from the BWA for health reasons, and the UMB took over the organization of the tournament series from then on and the BWA broke up due to succession problems.

From 1994, the UMB tournaments were organized in collaboration with the European member association “Confédération Européenne de Billard” (CEB). Since 2004, the World-Cup has been organized as UMB/CEB (in Europe), UMB/CPB (in America), UMB/(in Amerika), UMB/ACBC World-Cup (in Asia), and since 2014, as UMB/ACC in Africa. The prize money amounts to approximately 35,000 € per tournament. The prize money has been €106,500 per tournament since 2018.

All detailed results are listed on the german Three-Cushion World Cup page.

The individual results of the World Cup 1997/1 were lost directly following the tournament and, up to now, have been unable to be reconstructed, even through research by the well-known billiards archivists Heinrich Weingartner and Dieter Haase (both editors of the three-volume "Encyclopedia of Billiards Sports").

In 2012, only three tournaments were held for the overall winner appointment, instead of the required four, thus the year remains the first year without a title award. On 26 January 2013 it was announced that the Greek shipping magnate, Thanos Athanasiou, until 1995 a player himself, would finance a total of five tournaments in the coming three years. These include the three World-Cup tournaments until 2015, as well as the Junior World Championships in 2013 and the Women's World-Cup in 2014. All tournaments will be played in Athens.

== Media Report Transmission ==
Until the 2019/20 season, the French billiards portal Kozoom broadcast all UMB tournaments on the Internet and some of them were also taken over by the national broadcasters that hosted them. From the 2021/22 season, this task will be taken over by the Korean partner of Kozoom Five&Six. Since 2024, all games have been streamed by Afreeca TV, which has since rebranded as SOOP. Full game results are available on the websites of SOOP, Five & Six, and the UMB.

== Modus ==
Initially, the game was played in a set system of up to 15 points, with two winning sets to be completed in the qualification and then three winning sets in the final round. In 2013 they switched to the points system, with up to 30/35 points being played in the pre-qualification and up to 40 points in the last qualification and first final round groups. in the single-elimination goes to 50 points. At the change of season in 2019, the first final round will also be held as a group round (8 ×) of 4 players each.

== Records ==
- Torbjörn Blomdahl is record winner with 46 single and 11 total victories.
- The best general average (GA) was achieved by Daniel Sánchez with 2,777 points (1. April 2017 in Luxor). This is a new official world record.
- The best single average (SA) was achieved by Bao Phương Vinh in the match against David Pennor in Antwerp (9. Oktober 2025) with 10,000 points (40 points in 4 runs).
- The highest run in World Cup tournaments has been 28 points since November 8, 2024, set by Kim Jun-tae in the match against Glenn Hofman at the World Cup tournament in Seoul, South-Korea.
- One set, 15 points, in one run in a World-Cup tournament (which until 2012 was also the highest series) was achieved so far by:
  - Nobuaki Kobayashi (Valkenburg 1986)
  - Torbjörn Blomdahl (Gent 1991, Istanbul 1995)
  - Marco Zanetti (Halle 1997, Antwerp 2004, Sluiskil 2007, Alcalá de Guadaira 2008)
  - Semih Saygıner (Antwerp 1997)
  - Eddy Leppens (Oosterhout 1998)
  - Raymond Ceulemans (Oosterhout 1999)
  - Frédéric Caudron (Sevilla 2004, Hurghada 2007)
  - Daniel Sánchez (Sevilla 2004, Hurghada 2009, Antalya 2012)
  - Dick Jaspers (Sluiskil 2005)
  - Peter de Backer (Barendrecht 2005)
  - Choi Jae-dong (Barendrecht 2005)
  - Jérémy Bury (Hurghada 2006, Antalya 2009)
  - Kim Kyung-roul (Hurghada 2009, Hurghada 2011)
  - Kim Bong-soo (Suwon 2010)
  - Murat Naci Coklu (Hurghada 2010)
  - Antonio Ortiz Torrent (Suwon 2011)
  - Dave Christiani (Vienna 2011)

== Prize money and ranking points ==
	Prize money (€)	Ranking points
Winner	(1×) 16.000	80
Finalist	(1×) 10.000	54
Semi-finalists	(2×) 6.000	36
5. – 8.	(4×) 3.500	26
9. – 16.	(8×) 2.500	18
17. – 24.	(8×) 1.500	10
25. – 32.	(8×) 1.500	8
Quali	(21×) 500	5
P-Quali	–	4
PP-Quali	–	3
PPP-Quali	–	2
Overall	106.500	–

Prize money for overall winner
Place	€
1	30.000
2	15.000
3	10.000
Overall	55.000

Date of issue: 20 December 2017

== Tournament records timeline ==
With the set system, the best individual average (SA) is only counted in the game with 3 winning sets. This also applies to the GA, where at least five games must be played. Since the maximum streak of 15 points was achieved a total of 42 times in the days of the set system, players who have reached this number of points several times are only mentioned with their first streak. The numbers in brackets indicate the frequency.

General Average (GA)
GA	Name	Year
1,257	(Japan) Nobuaki Kobayashi	1986/1
1,516	(Belgium) Raymond Ceulemans	1986/2
1,643	(Japan) Nobuaki Kobayashi	1986/4
1,728	(Sweden) Torbjörn Blomdahl	1987/2
1,891	(Sweden) Torbjörn Blomdahl	1988/2
1,947	(Sweden) Torbjörn Blomdahl	1988/6
2,204	(Sweden) Torbjörn Blomdahl	1992/5
2,250	(Sweden) Torbjörn Blomdahl	1994/4
2,308	(Sweden) Torbjörn Blomdahl	1995/9
2,420	(Belgium) Frédéric Caudron	2011/4
2,465	(Netherlands) Dick Jaspers	2013/1
2,739	(Sweden) Torbjörn Blomdahl	2013/3
2,777	(Spain) Daniel Sánchez	2017/2

Special Average (SA)
SA	Name	Year
1,956	(United States) Allen Gilbert	1986/1
1,960	(Japan) Nobuaki Kobayashi	1986/4
2,093	(Sweden) Torbjörn Blomdahl	1987/2
2,142	(Sweden) Torbjörn Blomdahl	1988/1
2,812	(Japan) Nobuaki Kobayashi	1988/2
2,812	(Sweden) Torbjörn Blomdahl	1991/1
3,214	(Netherlands) Dick Jaspers	1994/3
3,214	(Sweden) Torbjörn Blomdahl	1994/4
5,000	(Belgium) Frédéric Caudron	1996/6
5,714	(Belgium) Eddy Merckx	2013/1
5,714	(Belgium) Frédéric Caudron	2017/1
5,714	(Belgium) Eddy Leppens	2017/4
6,666	(Turkey) Semih Saygıner	2018/5
10,000	(Vietnam) Bao Phương Vinh	2025/5

High Run (HR)
HR	Name	Year
13	(Japan) Nobuaki Kobayashi	1986/1
15	(Japan) Nobuaki Kobayashi	1986/4
15	(Sweden) Torbjörn Blomdahl (4)	1991/1
15	(Turkey) Semih Saygıner	1997/8
15	(Belgium) Eddy Leppens (2)	1998/8
15	(Netherlands) Raimond Burgman	1999/2
15	(Belgium) Raymond Ceulemans	1999/5
15	(Spain) Daniel Sánchez (3)	2004/3
15	(Italy) Marco Zanetti (4)	2004/5
15	(Netherlands) Dick Jaspers (2)	2005/1
15	(Belgium) Peter de Backer	2005/3
15	(South Korea) Choi Jae-dong	2005/3
15	(Belgium) Paul Stroobants	2006/2
15	(France) Jérémy Bury (3)	2006/2
15	(Turkey) Tayfun Taşdemir	2006/5
15	(Netherlands) Jean Paul de Bruijn	2007/6
15	(Netherlands) Barry van Beers	2008/1
15	(Austria) Andreas Efler	2008/5
15	(Belgium) Eddy Merckx	2009/3
15	(South Korea) Kim Kyung-roul (2)	2009/5
15	(South Korea) Kim Bong-soo	2010/2
15	(Turkey) Murat Naci Çoklu	2010/4
15	(Belgium) Roland Forthomme	2010/4
15	(Spain) Antonio Ortiz-Torrent	2011/3
15	(Netherlands) Dave Christiani	2011/4
15	(Turkey) Adnan Yüksel	2011/5
15	(South Korea) Kim Hyun-suk	2012/2
15	(South Korea) Um Sang-pil	2012/2
17	Eddy Merckx	2013/1
24	(France) Jérémy Bury	2013/2
24	(South Korea) Cho Myung-woo	2018/6
24	(Netherlands) Dick Jaspers	2019/5
26	(Sweden) Torbjörn Blomdahl	2023/3
28	(South Korea) Kim Jun-tae	2024/6

== Statistics ==
- The general average (GA) refers respectively to the entire tournament.

Colour key

BWA World Cups
UMB/CEB ParallelWorld Cups (1994 to 1997)
considered as World Championship by UMB
jointly organized World Cup (UMB/BWA)
UMB World Cups
Current official world record in the GA (date of issue: 1. April 2017)

List of single winners
No.	Year	Venue	Winner	GA	Second	GA	Third	GA
1	1986/1	(France) Paris	(Belgium) Raymond Ceulemans	1,157	(Japan) Nobuaki Kobayashi	1,257	(United States) Allen Gilbert	1,029
2	1986/2	(Belgium) Brussels	(Japan) Nobuaki Kobayashi	1,515	(Belgium) Raymond Ceulemans	1,516	(Netherlands) Rini van Bracht	1,198
3	1986/3	(Germany) Berlin	(Portugal) Egidio Vieira	1,098	(Belgium) Raymond Ceulemans	1,116	(Argentina) Luis Mario Doyharzabal	1,250
4	1986/4	(Netherlands) Valkenburg	(Japan) Nobuaki Kobayashi	1,643	(Belgium) Raymond Ceulemans	1,430	(Japan) Junichi Komori	1,305
5	1987/1	(France) Paris	(Belgium) Raymond Ceulemans	1,303	(Italy) Marco Zanetti	1,145	(Japan) Nobuaki Kobayashi	1,213
6	1987/2	(Belgium) Antwerp	(Sweden) Torbjörn Blomdahl	1,728	(Belgium) Raymond Ceulemans	1,253	(Belgium) Ludo Dielis	1,409
7	1987/3	(Germany) Berlin	(Japan) Junichi Komori	1,364	(Belgium) Raymond Ceulemans	1,726	(Sweden) Torbjörn Blomdahl	1,496
8	1987/4	(Netherlands) Valkenburg	(Sweden) Torbjörn Blomdahl	1,500	(Italy) Marco Zanetti	1,130	(Japan) Junichi Komori	1,142
9	1988/1	(France) Paris	(Sweden) Torbjörn Blomdahl	1,360	(Germany) Dieter Müller	1,168	(Belgium) Raymond Ceulemans	1,442
10	1988/2	(Belgium) Antwerp	(Japan) Nobuaki Kobayashi	1,507	(Japan) Junichi Komori	1,724	(Sweden) Torbjörn Blomdahl	1,891
11	1988/3	(Germany) Berlin	(Sweden) Torbjörn Blomdahl	1,764	(Japan) Junichi Komori	1,380	(Belgium) Raymond Ceulemans	1,375
12	1988/4	(Spain) Palma	(Sweden) Torbjörn Blomdahl	1,298	(Japan) Junichi Komori	1,212	(Belgium) Ludo Dielis	1,404
13	1988/5	(Netherlands) Valkenburg	(Belgium) Laurent Boulanger	1,395	(Japan) Nobuaki Kobayashi	1,318	(Belgium) Raymond Ceulemans	1,267
14	1988/6	(Japan) Tokyo	(Sweden) Torbjörn Blomdahl	1,947	(Japan) Akio Shimada	1,145	(Belgium) Raymond Ceulemans	1,180
15	1989/1	(Belgium) Deurne	(France) Richard Bitalis	1,311	(Belgium) Ludo Dielis	1,406	(Netherlands) Rini van Bracht	1,238
16	1989/2	(Germany) Berlin	(Belgium) Ludo Dielis	1,466	(Japan) Nobuaki Kobayashi	1,311	(Japan) Yoshihiko Mano	1,170
17	1989/3	(Spain) Palma	(Belgium) Raymond Ceulemans	1,280	(Sweden) Torbjörn Blomdahl	1,275	(Belgium) Ludo Dielis	1,352
18	1989/4	(United States) Las Vegas	(Sweden) Torbjörn Blomdahl	1,558	(Japan) Junichi Komori	0,971	(Belgium) Raymond Ceulemans	1,406
19	1989/5	(Japan) Yokohama	(Sweden) Torbjörn Blomdahl	1,406	(Belgium) Ludo Dielis	1,310	(Japan) Junichi Komori	1,342
20	1990/1	(Belgium) Antwerp	(Sweden) Torbjörn Blomdahl	1,671	(Belgium) Raymond Ceulemans	1,500	(Netherlands) Dick Jaspers	1,266
21	1990/2	(France) Paris	(Belgium) Raymond Ceulemans	1,521	(France) Richard Bitalis	1,356	(Sweden) Torbjörn Blomdahl	1,503
22	1990/3	(Germany) Berlin	(Belgium) Ludo Dielis	1,644	(Sweden) Torbjörn Blomdahl	1,909	(Belgium) Raymond Ceulemans	1,330
23	1990/4	(Sweden) Norrköping	(Belgium) Raymond Ceulemans	1,648	(France) Richard Bitalis	1,425	(Sweden) Torbjörn Blomdahl	1,484
24	1990/5	(Spain) Palma	(Italy) Marco Zanetti	1,760	(Belgium) Raymond Ceulemans	1,603	(France) Richard Bitalis	1,447
25	1990/6	(Japan) Tokyo	(Sweden) Torbjörn Blomdahl	1,632	(Belgium) Ludo Dielis	1,284	(Belgium) Raymond Ceulemans	1,584
26	1991/1	(Belgium) Gent	(Sweden) Torbjörn Blomdahl	1,758	(United States) Sang Lee	1,482	(France) Richard Bitalis	1,315
27	1991/2	(Germany) Berlin	(United States) Sang Lee	1,492	(Belgium) Raymond Ceulemans	1,570	(France) Richard Bitalis	1,335
28	1991/3	(Spain) Palma	(Sweden) Torbjörn Blomdahl	1,616	(Belgium) Raymond Ceulemans	1,857	(Netherlands) Dick Jaspers	1,579
29	1991/4	(South Korea) Seoul	(Belgium) Raymond Ceulemans	1,356	(Japan) Yoshihiko Mano	1,024	(Belgium) Ludo Dielis	1,106
30	1991/5	(Japan) Tokyo	(Netherlands) Dick Jaspers	1,712	(Italy) Marco Zanetti	1,587	(Belgium) Ludo Dielis	1,161
31	1992/1	(Netherlands) Oosterhout	(Netherlands) Rini van Bracht	1,488	(Belgium) Frédéric Caudron	1,215	(Sweden) Torbjörn Blomdahl	1,756
32	1992/2	(Belgium) Gent	(United States) Sang Lee	1,578	(Belgium) Ludo Dielis	1,505	(Belgium) Raymond Ceulemans	1,469
33	1992/3	(Germany) Berlin	(Sweden) Torbjörn Blomdahl	1,796	(Netherlands) Dick Jaspers	1,413	(Mexico) José Paniagua	1,181
34	1992/4	(France) Orléans	(Belgium) Raymond Ceulemans	1,492	(Japan) Junichi Komori	1,248	(Sweden) Torbjörn Blomdahl	1,432
35	1992/5	(Japan) Tokyo	(Sweden) Torbjörn Blomdahl	2,204	(Belgium) Raymond Ceulemans	1,396	(France) Richard Bitalis	1,424
36	1992/6	(Spain) Palma	(Sweden) Torbjörn Blomdahl	1,658	(United States) Sang Lee	1,648	(Belgium) Raymond Ceulemans	1,441
37	1993/1	(Netherlands) Oosterhout	(Sweden) Torbjörn Blomdahl	1,462	(Belgium) Raymond Ceulemans	1,540	(United States) Sang Lee	1,516
38	1993/2	(Turkey) Istanbul	(United States) Sang Lee	1,524	(Belgium) Raymond Ceulemans	1,539	(Belgium) Ludo Dielis	1,224
39	1993/3	(Germany) Berlin	(Sweden) Torbjörn Blomdahl	1,681	(Italy) Marco Zanetti	1,401	(Turkey) Semih Saygıner	1,566
40	1993/4	(Japan) Tokyo	(Belgium) Raymond Ceulemans	1,461	(Japan) Nobuaki Kobayashi	1,485	(Sweden) Torbjörn Blomdahl	1,472
41	1993/5	(Italy) Bolzano	(Sweden) Torbjörn Blomdahl	1,904	(Denmark) Tonny Carlsen	1,678	(Netherlands) Dick Jaspers	1,621
42	1994/1	(Belgium) Gent	(United States) Sang Lee	1,181	(Belgium) Frédéric Caudron	1,358	(Italy) Marco Zanetti	1,539
43	1994/2	(Egypt) Cairo	(Belgium) Koen Ceulemans	1,231	(Spain) Daniel Sánchez	1,265	(Germany) Christian Rudolph	1,095
44	1994/3	(Turkey) Istanbul	(Netherlands) Dick Jaspers	1,758	(Belgium) Raymond Ceulemans	1,590	(Sweden) Torbjörn Blomdahl	1,576
45	1994/4	(Netherlands) Oosterhout	(Austria) Christoph Pilss	1,402	(Sweden) Torbjörn Blomdahl	2,250	(United States) Sang Lee	1,666
46	1994/5	(Germany) Halle (Saale)	(Netherlands) Dick Jaspers	2,007	(Sweden) Torbjörn Blomdahl	1,660	(Netherlands) Raimond Burgman	1,432
47	1994/6	(Netherlands) Dongen	(Portugal) Jorge Theriaga	1,409	(Spain) Daniel Sánchez	1,363	(Netherlands) John Tijssens	1,176
48	1994/7	(Belgium) Gent	(Turkey) Semih Saygıner	1,567	(Sweden) Torbjörn Blomdahl	1,672	(Belgium) Ludo Dielis	1,428
49	1995/1	(Denmark) Vejle	(Switzerland) Andreas Efler	1,377	(Netherlands) Rini van Bracht	1,160	(Netherlands) John Tijssens	1,347
50	1995/2	(Greece) Athen	(Spain) Daniel Sánchez	1,456	(Portugal) Jorge Theriaga	1,282	(Belgium) Eddy Merckx	1,484
51	1995/3	(Luxembourg) Mondorf-les-Bains	(Netherlands) Rini van Bracht	1,376	(Germany) Christian Rudolph	1,513	(Portugal) Jorge Theriaga	1,335
52	1995/4	(Portugal) Porto	(Spain) Daniel Sánchez	1,366	(Belgium) Leon Smolders	1,142	(Belgium) Eddy Merckx	1,215
53	1995/5	(Belgium) Hooglede	(Denmark) Hans Laursen	1,247	(Netherlands) Rini van Bracht	1,111	(Denmark) Dion Nelin	1,236
54	1995/6	(Netherlands) Oosterhout	(Netherlands) Dick Jaspers	1,807	(Sweden) Torbjörn Blomdahl	1,842	(United States) Sang Lee	1,316
55	1995/7	(Germany) Halle (Saale)	(Sweden) Torbjörn Blomdahl	1,824	(Belgium) Raymond Ceulemans	1,388	(Denmark) Tonny Carlsen	1,431
56	1995/8	(Belgium) Antwerp	(Belgium) Raymond Ceulemans	1,757	(Italy) Marco Zanetti	1,473	(Netherlands) Louis Havermans	1,258
57	1995/9	(Turkey) Istanbul	(Sweden) Torbjörn Blomdahl	2,308	(Belgium) Raymond Ceulemans	1,535	(Netherlands) Raimond Burgman	1,170
No.	Year	Venue	Winner	GA	Second	GA	Semi- finalists	GA
58	1996/1	(Turkey) Antalya	(Portugal) Jorge Theriaga	1,295	(Belgium) Eddy Leppens	1,324	(Spain) Daniel Sánchez	1,288
58	1996/1	(Turkey) Antalya	(Portugal) Jorge Theriaga	1,295	(Belgium) Eddy Leppens	1,324	(Belgium) Koen Ceulemans	1,187
59	1996/2	(Portugal) Porto	(Denmark) Dion Nelin	1,489	(Belgium) Jozef Philipoom	1,270	(Spain) Daniel Sánchez	1,300
59	1996/2	(Portugal) Porto	(Denmark) Dion Nelin	1,489	(Belgium) Jozef Philipoom	1,270	(Denmark) Hans Laursen	1,069
60	1996/3	(Belgium) Hooglede	(Belgium) Ludo Dielis	1,347	(Spain) Daniel Sánchez	1,581	(Belgium) Eddy Merckx	1,410
60	1996/3	(Belgium) Hooglede	(Belgium) Ludo Dielis	1,347	(Spain) Daniel Sánchez	1,581	(Belgium) Peter de Backer	1,244
61	1996/4	(Greece) Athen	(Belgium) Francis Forton	1,228	(Germany) Christian Rudolph	1,327	(Portugal) Jorge Theriaga	1,246
61	1996/4	(Greece) Athen	(Belgium) Francis Forton	1,228	(Germany) Christian Rudolph	1,327	(Portugal) Egidio Vieira	1,244
62	1996/5	(Netherlands) Oosterhout	(Netherlands) Dick Jaspers	1,690	(Italy) Marco Zanetti	1,704	(Sweden) Torbjörn Blomdahl	1,914
63	1996/6	(South Korea) Daegu	(Netherlands) Raimond Burgman	1,379	(United States) Sang Lee	1,433	(Italy) Marco Zanetti	1,573
64	1996/7	(Belgium) Antwerp	(Sweden) Torbjörn Blomdahl	1,524	(Turkey) Semih Saygıner	1,375	(Belgium) Raymond Ceulemans	1,488
65	1996/8	(Turkey) Istanbul	(Sweden) Torbjörn Blomdahl	1,651	(Denmark) Tonny Carlsen	1,285	(Netherlands) Dick Jaspers	1,532
66	1997/1	(South Korea) Seoul	(Germany) Christian Rudolph	?,???	(Portugal) Jorge Theriaga	?,???	(Spain) Daniel Sánchez	?,???
66	1997/1	(South Korea) Seoul	(Germany) Christian Rudolph	?,???	(Portugal) Jorge Theriaga	?,???	(South Korea) Kim Chul-min	?,???
67	1997/2	(Italy) Salsomaggiore Terme	(Turkey) Yilmaz Özcan	1,376	(Germany) Martin Horn	1,327	(Denmark) Dion Nelin	1,093
67	1997/2	(Italy) Salsomaggiore Terme	(Turkey) Yilmaz Özcan	1,376	(Germany) Martin Horn	1,327	(Germany) Stefan Galla	1,248
68	1997/3	(Portugal) Porto	(Denmark) Dion Nelin	1,575	(Spain) Daniel Sánchez	1,685	(Belgium) Eddy Leppens	1,268
68	1997/3	(Portugal) Porto	(Denmark) Dion Nelin	1,575	(Spain) Daniel Sánchez	1,685	(Germany) Stefan Galla	1,137
69	1997/4	(Belgium) Hooglede	(Belgium) Eddy Merckx	1,343	(Germany) Martin Horn	1,389	(Turkey) Yilmaz Özcan	1,356
69	1997/4	(Belgium) Hooglede	(Belgium) Eddy Merckx	1,343	(Germany) Martin Horn	1,389	(Belgium) Eddy Leppens	1,423
70	1997/5	(Germany) Herne	(Germany) Christian Rudolph	1,410	(Belgium) Eddy Leppens	1,189	(Luxembourg) Fonsy Grethen	1,073
70	1997/5	(Germany) Herne	(Germany) Christian Rudolph	1,410	(Belgium) Eddy Leppens	1,189	(Belgium) Peter de Backer	1,385
71	1997/6	(Netherlands) Oosterhout	(Belgium) Frédéric Caudron	1,662	(Netherlands) Dick Jaspers	1,685	(Turkey) Semih Saygıner	1,244
72	1997/7	(Turkey) Antalya	(Netherlands) Dick Jaspers	1,805	(Sweden) Torbjörn Blomdahl	1,964	(Spain) Daniel Sánchez	1,605
72	1997/7	(Turkey) Antalya	(Netherlands) Dick Jaspers	1,805	(Sweden) Torbjörn Blomdahl	1,964	(Austria) Andreas Efler	1,324
73	1997/8	(Belgium) Antwerp	(Netherlands) Dick Jaspers	1,583	(Netherlands) Gerwin Valentijn	1,500	(Belgium) Frédéric Caudron	1,475
74	1998/1	(Netherlands) Barendrecht	(Sweden) Torbjörn Blomdahl	2,089	(Denmark) Dion Nelin	1,296	(Italy) Marco Zanetti	1,692
74	1998/1	(Netherlands) Barendrecht	(Sweden) Torbjörn Blomdahl	2,089	(Denmark) Dion Nelin	1,296	(United States) Sang Lee	1,482
75	1998/2	(Netherlands) Bussum	(Sweden) Torbjörn Blomdahl	1,983	(Netherlands) Dick Jaspers	2,150	(Italy) Marco Zanetti	1,598
75	1998/2	(Netherlands) Bussum	(Sweden) Torbjörn Blomdahl	1,983	(Netherlands) Dick Jaspers	2,150	(Netherlands) Henk Habraken	1,239
76	1998/3	(Portugal) Lisbon	(Netherlands) Dick Jaspers	1,660	(Sweden) Torbjörn Blomdahl	1,704	(Denmark) Dion Nelin	1,518
76	1998/3	(Portugal) Lisbon	(Netherlands) Dick Jaspers	1,660	(Sweden) Torbjörn Blomdahl	1,704	(Turkey) Semih Saygıner	1,366
77	1998/4	(Belgium) Hooglede	(Sweden) Torbjörn Blomdahl	2,033	(Netherlands) Dick Jaspers	2,314	(Belgium) Frédéric Caudron	1,321
77	1998/4	(Belgium) Hooglede	(Sweden) Torbjörn Blomdahl	2,033	(Netherlands) Dick Jaspers	2,314	(Germany) Christian Rudolph	1,475
78	1998/5	(Greece) Corfu	(Netherlands) Dick Jaspers	1,568	(Portugal) Jorge Theriaga	1,244	(Netherlands) Ben Velthuis	1,230
78	1998/5	(Greece) Corfu	(Netherlands) Dick Jaspers	1,568	(Portugal) Jorge Theriaga	1,244	(Netherlands) Raimond Burgman	1,456
79	1998/6	(Colombia) Bogotá	(Belgium) Frédéric Caudron	1,523	(United States) Carlos Hallon	1,153	(Netherlands) Raimond Burgman	1,363
79	1998/6	(Colombia) Bogotá	(Belgium) Frédéric Caudron	1,523	(United States) Carlos Hallon	1,153	(Turkey) Semih Saygıner	1,224
80	1998/7	(Spain) Torremolinos	(Sweden) Torbjörn Blomdahl	1,486	(Belgium) Eddy Leppens	1,318	(Belgium) Raymond Ceulemans	1,516
80	1998/7	(Spain) Torremolinos	(Sweden) Torbjörn Blomdahl	1,486	(Belgium) Eddy Leppens	1,318	(Turkey) Semih Saygıner	1,218
81	1998/8	(Netherlands) Oosterhout	(Spain) Daniel Sánchez	1,773	(Netherlands) Dick Jaspers	2,094	(Turkey) Semih Saygıner	1,906
82	1998/9	(Turkey) Antalya	(Turkey) Semih Saygıner	1,649	(Netherlands) Gerwin Valentijn	1,503	(Italy) Marco Zanetti	1,331
82	1998/9	(Turkey) Antalya	(Turkey) Semih Saygıner	1,649	(Netherlands) Gerwin Valentijn	1,503	(Germany) Christian Rudolph	1,311
83	1998/10	(Netherlands) Roermond	(Belgium) Frédéric Caudron	1,658	(Sweden) Torbjörn Blomdahl	1,503	(Italy) Marco Zanetti	1,551
83	1998/10	(Netherlands) Roermond	(Belgium) Frédéric Caudron	1,658	(Sweden) Torbjörn Blomdahl	1,503	(Denmark) Dion Nelin	1,544
84	1999/1	(South Korea) Seoul	(Netherlands) Dick Jaspers	1,103	(Denmark) Tonny Carlsen	1,491	(Turkey) Semih Saygıner	1,608
84	1999/1	(South Korea) Seoul	(Netherlands) Dick Jaspers	1,103	(Denmark) Tonny Carlsen	1,491	(Germany) Christian Rudolph	1,437
85	1999/2	(United States) Las Vegas	(United States) Sang Lee	1,625	(Turkey) Semih Saygıner	1,712	(Sweden) Torbjörn Blomdahl	1,813
85	1999/2	(United States) Las Vegas	(United States) Sang Lee	1,625	(Turkey) Semih Saygıner	1,712	(Netherlands) Raimond Burgman	1,550
86	1999/3	(Germany) Berlin	(Italy) Marco Zanetti	2,082	(Germany) Martin Horn	1,289	(United States) Sang Lee	1,512
86	1999/3	(Germany) Berlin	(Italy) Marco Zanetti	2,082	(Germany) Martin Horn	1,289	(Belgium) Eddy Leppens	1,331
87	1999/4	(Turkey) Kemer	(Sweden) Torbjörn Blomdahl	2,055	(United States) Sang Lee	1,461	(Denmark) Jakob Haack-Sörensen	1,586
87	1999/4	(Turkey) Kemer	(Sweden) Torbjörn Blomdahl	2,055	(United States) Sang Lee	1,461	(Netherlands) Dick Jaspers	1,757
88	1999/5	(Netherlands) Oosterhout	(Netherlands) Dick Jaspers	1,815	(Portugal) Jorge Theriaga	1,288	(United States) Sang Lee	1,954
89	2000/1	(Colombia) Bogotá	(Turkey) Semih Saygıner	1,404	(Sweden) Torbjörn Blomdahl	1,672	(Belgium) Frédéric Caudron	1,381
89	2000/1	(Colombia) Bogotá	(Turkey) Semih Saygıner	1,404	(Sweden) Torbjörn Blomdahl	1,672	(Denmark) Dion Nelin	1,466
90	2000/2	(Netherlands) Oosterhout	(Sweden) Torbjörn Blomdahl	1,893	(Denmark) Dion Nelin	1,379	(Spain) Daniel Sánchez	1,513
91	2001/1	(Colombia) Bogotá	(Turkey) Semih Saygıner	1,452	(Netherlands) Dick Jaspers	1,660	(Belgium) Frédéric Caudron	1,626
91	2001/1	(Colombia) Bogotá	(Turkey) Semih Saygıner	1,452	(Netherlands) Dick Jaspers	1,660	(Colombia) Jaime Bedoya	1,337
92	2001/2	(United States) Las Vegas	(Sweden) Torbjörn Blomdahl	2,050	(Netherlands) Dick Jaspers	1,891	(Italy) Marco Zanetti	1,397
92	2001/2	(United States) Las Vegas	(Sweden) Torbjörn Blomdahl	2,050	(Netherlands) Dick Jaspers	1,891	(Denmark) Tonny Carlsen	1,317
93	2001/3	(Turkey) Kuşadası	(Netherlands) Dick Jaspers	1,497	(Spain) Daniel Sánchez	1,429	(Turkey) Semih Saygıner	1,615
93	2001/3	(Turkey) Kuşadası	(Netherlands) Dick Jaspers	1,497	(Spain) Daniel Sánchez	1,429	(Italy) Marco Zanetti	1,441
94	2001/4	(Spain) Lugo	(Sweden) Torbjörn Blomdahl	1,794	(Netherlands) Dick Jaspers	1,546	(Turkey) Semih Saygıner	1,572
94	2001/4	(Spain) Lugo	(Sweden) Torbjörn Blomdahl	1,794	(Netherlands) Dick Jaspers	1,546	(Belgium) Eddy Merckx	1,431
95	2001/5	(Netherlands) Oosterhout	(Sweden) Torbjörn Blomdahl	1,538	(Turkey) Semih Saygıner	1,321	(Italy) Marco Zanetti	1,368
	2002	Not held						
96	2003	(United States) Las Vegas	(Turkey) Semih Saygıner	1,606	(Netherlands) Dick Jaspers	1,719	(Spain) Daniel Sánchez	1,623
96	2003	(United States) Las Vegas	(Turkey) Semih Saygıner	1,606	(Netherlands) Dick Jaspers	1,719	(Italy) Marco Zanetti	1,286
97	2004/1	(Netherlands) Barendrecht	(Sweden) Torbjörn Blomdahl	2,076	(Netherlands) Dick Jaspers	2,058	(Turkey) Semih Saygıner	1,464
No.	Year	Venue	Winner	GA	Second	GA	Semi- finalists	GA
98	2004/2	(Greece) Athen	(Turkey) Semih Saygıner	2,000	(Belgium) Frédéric Caudron	1,404	(Sweden) Torbjörn Blomdahl	1,794
98	2004/2	(Greece) Athen	(Turkey) Semih Saygıner	2,000	(Belgium) Frédéric Caudron	1,404	(Belgium) Eddy Merckx	1,457
99	2004/3	(Spain) Seville	(Belgium) Frédéric Caudron	1,668	(Spain) Daniel Sánchez	1,570	(Sweden) Torbjörn Blomdahl	1,626
99	2004/3	(Spain) Seville	(Belgium) Frédéric Caudron	1,668	(Spain) Daniel Sánchez	1,570	(Turkey) Semih Saygıner	1,525
100	2004/4	(Egypt) Hurghada	(Spain) Daniel Sánchez	1,277	(Turkey) Murat Naci Coklu	1,494	(Sweden) Torbjörn Blomdahl	1,546
100	2004/4	(Egypt) Hurghada	(Spain) Daniel Sánchez	1,277	(Turkey) Murat Naci Coklu	1,494	(Denmark) Brian Knudsen	1,211
101	2004/5	(Belgium) Antwerp	(Spain) Daniel Sánchez	1,938	(Turkey) Semih Saygıner	1,838	(Netherlands) Dick Jaspers	1,918
101	2004/5	(Belgium) Antwerp	(Spain) Daniel Sánchez	1,938	(Turkey) Semih Saygıner	1,838	(Germany) Martin Horn	1,589
102	2005/1	(Netherlands) Sluiskil	(Netherlands) Dick Jaspers	2,181	(Sweden) Torbjörn Blomdahl	1,754	(Turkey) Semih Saygıner	1,570
102	2005/1	(Netherlands) Sluiskil	(Netherlands) Dick Jaspers	2,181	(Sweden) Torbjörn Blomdahl	1,754	(Spain) Daniel Sánchez	1,566
103	2005/2	(Egypt) Hurghada	(Belgium) Roland Forthomme	1,636	(Belgium) Frédéric Caudron	1,553	(Turkey) Semih Saygıner	1,478
103	2005/2	(Egypt) Hurghada	(Belgium) Roland Forthomme	1,636	(Belgium) Frédéric Caudron	1,553	(South Korea) Choi Jae-dong	1,324
104	2005/3	(Netherlands) Barendrecht	(Belgium) Eddy Merckx	2,062	(Belgium) Frédéric Caudron	2,058	(Italy) Marco Zanetti	1,368
104	2005/3	(Netherlands) Barendrecht	(Belgium) Eddy Merckx	2,062	(Belgium) Frédéric Caudron	2,058	(Netherlands) Raimond Burgman	1,651
105	2005/4	(Turkey) Istanbul	(Sweden) Torbjörn Blomdahl	1,786	(Belgium) Frédéric Caudron	2,032	(Netherlands) Jean Paul de Bruijn	1,405
105	2005/4	(Turkey) Istanbul	(Sweden) Torbjörn Blomdahl	1,786	(Belgium) Frédéric Caudron	2,032	(Turkey) Tayfun Taşdemir	1,694
106	2006/1	(Netherlands) Sluiskil	(Netherlands) Dick Jaspers	1,925	(Turkey) Adnan Yüksel	1,656	(Spain) Daniel Sánchez	1,678
106	2006/1	(Netherlands) Sluiskil	(Netherlands) Dick Jaspers	1,925	(Turkey) Adnan Yüksel	1,656	(Belgium) Roland Forthomme	1,569
107	2006/2	(Portugal) Porto	(Spain) Daniel Sánchez	1,505	(Netherlands) Dick Jaspers	1,810	(Netherlands) John Tijssens	1,109
107	2006/2	(Portugal) Porto	(Spain) Daniel Sánchez	1,505	(Netherlands) Dick Jaspers	1,810	(Belgium) Frédéric Caudron	1,790
108	2006/3	(Greece) Volos	(Belgium) Roland Forthomme	1,907	(Sweden) Torbjörn Blomdahl	1,946	(Italy) Marco Zanetti	1,542
108	2006/3	(Greece) Volos	(Belgium) Roland Forthomme	1,907	(Sweden) Torbjörn Blomdahl	1,946	(South Korea) Kim Kyung-roul	1,488
109	2006/4	(Egypt) Hurghada	(Spain) Daniel Sánchez	1,741	(Belgium) Peter de Backer	1,342	(Netherlands) Jean Paul de Bruijn	1,474
109	2006/4	(Egypt) Hurghada	(Spain) Daniel Sánchez	1,741	(Belgium) Peter de Backer	1,342	(Sweden) Mikael Nilsson	1,424
110	2006/5	(Turkey) Istanbul	(Sweden) Torbjörn Blomdahl	1,787	(Turkey) Semih Saygıner	1,690	(Turkey) Tayfun Taşdemir	1,672
110	2006/5	(Turkey) Istanbul	(Sweden) Torbjörn Blomdahl	1,787	(Turkey) Semih Saygıner	1,690	(Germany) Martin Horn	1,568
111	2007/1	(Netherlands) Sluiskil	(Sweden) Torbjörn Blomdahl	1,925	(Netherlands) Dick Jaspers	2,032	(Belgium) Roland Forthomme	1,517
111	2007/1	(Netherlands) Sluiskil	(Sweden) Torbjörn Blomdahl	1,925	(Netherlands) Dick Jaspers	2,032	(Germany) Martin Horn	1,715
112	2007/2	(Turkey) Manisa	(Sweden) Torbjörn Blomdahl	1,862	(Spain) Daniel Sánchez	1,783	(Netherlands) Dick Jaspers	1,966
112	2007/2	(Turkey) Manisa	(Sweden) Torbjörn Blomdahl	1,862	(Spain) Daniel Sánchez	1,783	(Turkey) Semih Saygıner	1,571
113	2007/3	(Greece) Corfu	(Belgium) Frédéric Caudron	1,755	(Turkey) Semih Saygıner	1,736	(Sweden) Torbjörn Blomdahl	1,612
113	2007/3	(Greece) Corfu	(Belgium) Frédéric Caudron	1,755	(Turkey) Semih Saygıner	1,736	(Spain) Daniel Sánchez	1,410
114	2007/4	(Portugal) Porto	(Sweden) Torbjörn Blomdahl	2,153	(Belgium) Roland Forthomme	1,443	(Belgium) Frédéric Caudron	1,800
114	2007/4	(Portugal) Porto	(Sweden) Torbjörn Blomdahl	2,153	(Belgium) Roland Forthomme	1,443	(Greece) Filippos Kasidokostas	1,595
115	2007/5	(Egypt) Hurghada	(Sweden) Torbjörn Blomdahl	1,468	(Germany) Martin Horn	1,612	(Netherlands) Dick Jaspers	2,259
115	2007/5	(Egypt) Hurghada	(Sweden) Torbjörn Blomdahl	1,468	(Germany) Martin Horn	1,612	(Belgium) Frédéric Caudron	1,910
116	2007/6	Mexico City	(Belgium) Frédéric Caudron	1,880	(Netherlands) Dick Jaspers	1,955	(Belgium) Roland Forthomme	1,600
116	2007/6	Mexico City	(Belgium) Frédéric Caudron	1,880	(Netherlands) Dick Jaspers	1,955	(South Korea) Kim Kyung-roul	1,519
117	2007/7	(South Korea) Seoul	(Spain) Daniel Sánchez	1,992	(Vietnam) Tran Chi Thanh	1,322	(Belgium) Frédéric Caudron	2,074
117	2007/7	(South Korea) Seoul	(Spain) Daniel Sánchez	1,992	(Vietnam) Tran Chi Thanh	1,322	(Peru) Ramon Rodriguez	1,640
118	2008/1	(Netherlands) Sluiskil	(Belgium) Frédéric Caudron	1,948	(Greece) Nikos Polychronopoulos	1,642	(Sweden) Torbjörn Blomdahl	1,847
118	2008/1	(Netherlands) Sluiskil	(Belgium) Frédéric Caudron	1,948	(Greece) Nikos Polychronopoulos	1,642	(South Korea) Kim Kyung-roul	1,610
119	2008/2	(Portugal) Porto	(Netherlands) Dick Jaspers	1,992	(Spain) Daniel Sánchez	1,755	(South Korea) Kim Kyung-roul	1,645
119	2008/2	(Portugal) Porto	(Netherlands) Dick Jaspers	1,992	(Spain) Daniel Sánchez	1,755	(Sweden) Torbjörn Blomdahl	1,716
120	2008/3	(Mexico) Irapuato	(Netherlands) Dick Jaspers	1,729	(Spain) Daniel Sánchez	1,535	(Italy) Marco Zanetti	1,697
120	2008/3	(Mexico) Irapuato	(Netherlands) Dick Jaspers	1,729	(Spain) Daniel Sánchez	1,535	(Belgium) Frédéric Caudron	1,760
121	2008/4	(South Korea) Suwon	(Netherlands) Dick Jaspers	1,782	(South Korea) Kim Kyung-roul	1,494	(Sweden) Torbjörn Blomdahl	1,564
121	2008/4	(South Korea) Suwon	(Netherlands) Dick Jaspers	1,782	(South Korea) Kim Kyung-roul	1,494	(Belgium) Frédéric Caudron	1,471
122	2008/5	(Egypt) Hurghada	(Spain) Daniel Sánchez	1,779	(Belgium) Eddy Merckx	1,544	(Netherlands) Jean Paul de Bruijn	1,273
122	2008/5	(Egypt) Hurghada	(Spain) Daniel Sánchez	1,779	(Belgium) Eddy Merckx	1,544	(Belgium) Peter de Backer*^{1}	–
123	2008/6	(Spain) Alcalá de Guadaíra	(Netherlands) Dick Jaspers	1,770	(Sweden) Torbjörn Blomdahl	1,786	(Germany) Martin Horn	1,722
123	2008/6	(Spain) Alcalá de Guadaíra	(Netherlands) Dick Jaspers	1,770	(Sweden) Torbjörn Blomdahl	1,786	(Spain) Daniel Sánchez	1,787
124	2009/1	(Netherlands) Sluiskil	(Belgium) Frédéric Caudron	1,695	(Belgium) Jozef Philipoom	1,685	(Turkey) Tayfun Taşdemir	1,710
124	2009/1	(Netherlands) Sluiskil	(Belgium) Frédéric Caudron	1,695	(Belgium) Jozef Philipoom	1,685	(Sweden) Torbjörn Blomdahl	1,649
125	2009/2	(Turkey) Antalya	(Germany) Martin Horn	1,626	(Netherlands) Dick Jaspers	1,600	(Belgium) Frédéric Caudron	1,713
125	2009/2	(Turkey) Antalya	(Germany) Martin Horn	1,626	(Netherlands) Dick Jaspers	1,600	(Sweden) Torbjörn Blomdahl	1,343
126	2009/3	(Portugal) Matosinhos	(Belgium) Eddy Merckx	1,751	(Greece) Nikos Polychronopoulos	1,592	(South Korea) Cho Jae-ho	1,656
126	2009/3	(Portugal) Matosinhos	(Belgium) Eddy Merckx	1,751	(Greece) Nikos Polychronopoulos	1,592	(France) Jérémy Bury	1,483
127	2009/4	(South Korea) Suwon	(Belgium) Frédéric Caudron	1,950	(Italy) Marco Zanetti	1,892	(Sweden) Torbjörn Blomdahl	1,712
127	2009/4	(South Korea) Suwon	(Belgium) Frédéric Caudron	1,950	(Italy) Marco Zanetti	1,892	(South Korea) Kim Kyung-roul	1,585
128	2009/5	(Egypt) Hurghada	(Belgium) Jozef Philipoom	1,443	(Sweden) Torbjörn Blomdahl	1,654	(Turkey) Tayfun Taşdemir	1,589
128	2009/5	(Egypt) Hurghada	(Belgium) Jozef Philipoom	1,443	(Sweden) Torbjörn Blomdahl	1,654	(Spain) Ruben Legazpi	1,544
129	2010/1	(Turkey) Antalya	(South Korea) Kim Kyung-roul	1,601	(Netherlands) Dick Jaspers	1,815	(Germany) Martin Horn	1,744
129	2010/1	(Turkey) Antalya	(South Korea) Kim Kyung-roul	1,601	(Netherlands) Dick Jaspers	1,815	(Greece) Filippos Kasidokostas	1,532
130	2010/2	(South Korea) Suwon	(Netherlands) Dick Jaspers	2,153	(Greece) Filippos Kasidokostas	1,715	(France) Jérémy Bury	1,533
130	2010/2	(South Korea) Suwon	(Netherlands) Dick Jaspers	2,153	(Greece) Filippos Kasidokostas	1,715	(Turkey) Tayfun Taşdemir	1,891
131	2010/3	(Portugal) Matosinhos	(Belgium) Frédéric Caudron	1,476	(Germany) Martin Horn	1,550	(France) Jérémy Bury	1,620
131	2010/3	(Portugal) Matosinhos	(Belgium) Frédéric Caudron	1,476	(Germany) Martin Horn	1,550	(Netherlands) Dick Jaspers	1,729
132	2010/4	(Egypt) Hurghada	(Greece) Filippos Kasidokostas	1,860	(Belgium) Frédéric Caudron	1,802	(France) Jérémy Bury	1,853
132	2010/4	(Egypt) Hurghada	(Greece) Filippos Kasidokostas	1,860	(Belgium) Frédéric Caudron	1,802	(Japan) Kouji Funaki	1,686
133	2011/1	(Turkey) Trabzon	(Belgium) Eddy Merckx	1,655	(South Korea) Kim Kyung-roul	1,800	(Sweden) Torbjörn Blomdahl	1,911
133	2011/1	(Turkey) Trabzon	(Belgium) Eddy Merckx	1,655	(South Korea) Kim Kyung-roul	1,800	(Greece) Filippos Kasidokostas	1,639
134	2011/2	(Portugal) Matosinhos	(Spain) Daniel Sánchez	1,834	(Belgium) Frédéric Caudron	1,825	(Netherlands) Dick Jaspers	1,953
134	2011/2	(Portugal) Matosinhos	(Spain) Daniel Sánchez	1,834	(Belgium) Frédéric Caudron	1,825	(South Korea) Cho Jae-ho	1,573
135	2011/3	(South Korea) Suwon	(Sweden) Torbjörn Blomdahl	1,736	(South Korea) Cho Jae-ho	1,908	(France) Jérémy Bury	1,402
135	2011/3	(South Korea) Suwon	(Sweden) Torbjörn Blomdahl	1,736	(South Korea) Cho Jae-ho	1,908	(Vietnam) Xuan Cuong Ma	1,756
136	2011/4	(Austria) Vienna	(Belgium) Frédéric Caudron	2,420	(Sweden) Torbjörn Blomdahl	1,867	(Netherlands) Dick Jaspers	2,216
136	2011/4	(Austria) Vienna	(Belgium) Frédéric Caudron	2,420	(Sweden) Torbjörn Blomdahl	1,867	(Turkey) Lütfi Çenet	1,523
137	2011/5	(Egypt) Hurghada	(Turkey) Adnan Yüksel	1,757	(France) Jérémy Bury	1,701	(South Korea) Kim Kyung-roul	1,669
137	2011/5	(Egypt) Hurghada	(Turkey) Adnan Yüksel	1,757	(France) Jérémy Bury	1,701	(Belgium) Eddy Leppens	1,707
138	2012/1	(Turkey) Antalya	(South Korea) Choi Sung-won	1,581	(Turkey) Tayfun Taşdemir	1,637	(Belgium) Frédéric Caudron	2,195
138	2012/1	(Turkey) Antalya	(South Korea) Choi Sung-won	1,581	(Turkey) Tayfun Taşdemir	1,637	(Spain) Daniel Sánchez	1,657
139	2012/2	(South Korea) Suwon	(Sweden) Torbjörn Blomdahl	2,370	(Italy) Marco Zanetti	1,746	(Netherlands) Dick Jaspers	2,053
139	2012/2	(South Korea) Suwon	(Sweden) Torbjörn Blomdahl	2,370	(Italy) Marco Zanetti	1,746	(Belgium) Eddy Merckx	1,639
140	2012/3	(Egypt) Hurghada	(Belgium) Frédéric Caudron	1,826	(Turkey) Lütfi Çenet	1,684	(Netherlands) Dick Jaspers	1,676
140	2012/3	(Egypt) Hurghada	(Belgium) Frédéric Caudron	1,826	(Turkey) Lütfi Çenet	1,684	(France) Jérémy Bury	1,500
141	2013/1	(Turkey) Antalya	(Sweden) Torbjörn Blomdahl	1,834	(France) Jérémy Bury	2,076	(Netherlands) Dick Jaspers	2,465
141	2013/1	(Turkey) Antalya	(Sweden) Torbjörn Blomdahl	1,834	(France) Jérémy Bury	2,076	(Belgium) Eddy Merckx	2,276
142	2013/2	(South Korea) Guri	(South Korea) Kang Dong-koong	2,000	(Spain) Daniel Sánchez	2,000	(France) Jérémy Bury	1,756
142	2013/2	(South Korea) Guri	(South Korea) Kang Dong-koong	2,000	(Spain) Daniel Sánchez	2,000	(Vietnam) Ngo Dinh-Nai	1,622
143	2013/3	(Greece) Corinth	(Sweden) Torbjörn Blomdahl	2,739	(Spain) Ruben Legazpi	2,011	(Greece) Filippos Kasidokostas	1,857
143	2013/3	(Greece) Corinth	(Sweden) Torbjörn Blomdahl	2,739	(Spain) Ruben Legazpi	2,011	(Turkey) Tayfun Taşdemir	1,693
144	2013/4	(Colombia) Medellín	(Belgium) Frédéric Caudron	1,941	(Sweden) Torbjörn Blomdahl	1,532	(Belgium) Eddy Leppens	2,283
144	2013/4	(Colombia) Medellín	(Belgium) Frédéric Caudron	1,941	(Sweden) Torbjörn Blomdahl	1,532	(Greece) Filippos Kasidokostas	1,892
145	2013/5	(Egypt) Hurghada	(Belgium) Eddy Merckx	2,222	(Turkey) Tayfun Taşdemir	1,876	(Belgium) Frédéric Caudron	1,985
145	2013/5	(Egypt) Hurghada	(Belgium) Eddy Merckx	2,222	(Turkey) Tayfun Taşdemir	1,876	(South Korea) Choi Sung-won	1,704
146	2014/1	(Turkey) Istanbul	(South Korea) Cho Jae-ho	2,150	(South Korea) Choi Sung-won	1,351	(Belgium) Eddy Merckx	2,025
146	2014/1	(Turkey) Istanbul	(South Korea) Cho Jae-ho	2,150	(South Korea) Choi Sung-won	1,351	(South Korea) Kim Kyung-roul	1,817
147	2014/2	(Egypt) Luxor	(Belgium) Frédéric Caudron	2,272	(Sweden) Torbjörn Blomdahl	1,482	(Greece) Nikos Polychronopoulos	1,709
147	2014/2	(Egypt) Luxor	(Belgium) Frédéric Caudron	2,272	(Sweden) Torbjörn Blomdahl	1,482	(South Korea) Lee Choong-bok	1,547
148	2014/3	(Portugal) Porto	(Netherlands) Dick Jaspers	1,923	(Belgium) Roland Forthomme	1,825	(South Korea) Choi Sung-won	1,678
148	2014/3	(Portugal) Porto	(Netherlands) Dick Jaspers	1,923	(Belgium) Roland Forthomme	1,825	(Belgium) Peter Ceulemans	1,589
149	2014/4	(South Korea) Guri	(Belgium) Eddy Merckx	1,980	(Belgium) Frédéric Caudron	2,091	(Sweden) Torbjörn Blomdahl	2,264
149	2014/4	(South Korea) Guri	(Belgium) Eddy Merckx	1,980	(Belgium) Frédéric Caudron	2,091	(Vietnam) Nguyen Quoc Nguyen	1,923
150	2014/5	(Egypt) Hurghada	(Italy) Marco Zanetti	1,834	(South Korea) Kang Dong-koong	1,867	(South Korea) Hwang Hyung-bum	1,915
150	2014/5	(Egypt) Hurghada	(Italy) Marco Zanetti	1,834	(South Korea) Kang Dong-koong	1,867	(Spain) Javier Palazon	1,816
151	2015/1	(Egypt) Luxor	(Netherlands) Dick Jaspers	2,247	(South Korea) Kim Haeng-jik	2,000	(Spain) Daniel Sánchez	1,740
151	2015/1	(Egypt) Luxor	(Netherlands) Dick Jaspers	2,247	(South Korea) Kim Haeng-jik	2,000	(Sweden) Torbjörn Blomdahl	1,734
152	2015/2	(Portugal) Porto	(Sweden) Torbjörn Blomdahl	2,000	(South Korea) Hwang Hyung-bum	1,453	(Spain) Daniel Sánchez	2,390
152	2015/2	(Portugal) Porto	(Sweden) Torbjörn Blomdahl	2,000	(South Korea) Hwang Hyung-bum	1,453	(Netherlands) Dick Jaspers	1,790
153	2015/3	(Vietnam) Ho Chi Minh City	(Turkey) Tayfun Taşdemir	2,298	(Sweden) Torbjörn Blomdahl	2,108	(South Korea) Cho Jae-ho	2,191
153	2015/3	(Vietnam) Ho Chi Minh City	(Turkey) Tayfun Taşdemir	2,298	(Sweden) Torbjörn Blomdahl	2,108	(Belgium) Eddy Merckx	1,807
154	2015/4	(South Korea) Guri	(Spain) Daniel Sánchez	2,739	(Turkey) Tayfun Taşdemir	2,160	(Netherlands) Dick Jaspers	2,942
154	2015/4	(South Korea) Guri	(Spain) Daniel Sánchez	2,739	(Turkey) Tayfun Taşdemir	2,160	(Belgium) Frédéric Caudron	1,818
155	2015/5	(Turkey) Istanbul	(Turkey) Murat Naci Çoklu	1,612	(Belgium) Roland Forthomme	1,576	(Netherlands) Dick Jaspers	1,666
155	2015/5	(Turkey) Istanbul	(Turkey) Murat Naci Çoklu	1,612	(Belgium) Roland Forthomme	1,576	(Belgium) Eddy Merckx	1,500
156	2015/6	(Egypt) Hurghada	(Belgium) Frédéric Caudron	2,197	(Italy) Marco Zanetti	2,217	(Turkey) Lütfi Çenet	1,866
156	2015/6	(Egypt) Hurghada	(Belgium) Frédéric Caudron	2,197	(Italy) Marco Zanetti	2,217	(Spain) Daniel Sánchez	1,851
157	2016/1	(Turkey) Bursa	(Netherlands) Dick Jaspers	2,325	(Belgium) Frédéric Caudron	2,063	(Belgium) Eddy Merckx	2,260
157	2016/1	(Turkey) Bursa	(Netherlands) Dick Jaspers	2,325	(Belgium) Frédéric Caudron	2,063	(United States) Pedro Piedrabuena	1,462
158	2016/2	(Egypt) Luxor	(Belgium) Eddy Merckx	1,801	(France) Jérémy Bury	1,520	(Greece) Nikos Polychronopoulos	1,764
158	2016/2	(Egypt) Luxor	(Belgium) Eddy Merckx	1,801	(France) Jérémy Bury	1,520	(South Korea) Cho Jae-ho	1,470
159	2016/3	(Vietnam) Ho Chi Minh City	(Belgium) Frédéric Caudron	1,980	(Netherlands) Dick Jaspers	1,935	(Vietnam) Nguyen Quoc Nguyen	2,173
159	2016/3	(Vietnam) Ho Chi Minh City	(Belgium) Frédéric Caudron	1,980	(Netherlands) Dick Jaspers	1,935	(Italy) Marco Zanetti	2,000
160	2016/4	(Portugal) Porto	(Belgium) Frédéric Caudron	2,197	(Greece) Nikos Polychronopoulos	1,989	(Spain) Daniel Sánchez	1,986
160	2016/4	(Portugal) Porto	(Belgium) Frédéric Caudron	2,197	(Greece) Nikos Polychronopoulos	1,989	(Italy) Marco Zanetti	1,869
161	2016/5	(South Korea) Guri	(France) Jérémy Bury	2,020	(Vietnam) Tran Quyet Chien	1,900	(Netherlands) Dick Jaspers	2,181
161	2016/5	(South Korea) Guri	(France) Jérémy Bury	2,020	(Vietnam) Tran Quyet Chien	1,900	(South Korea) Cho Myung-woo	1,726
162	2016/6	(France) La Baule	(Turkey) Murat Naci Çoklu	1,980	(Spain) Daniel Sánchez	1,636	(Sweden) Torbjörn Blomdahl	1,795
162	2016/6	(France) La Baule	(Turkey) Murat Naci Çoklu	1,980	(Spain) Daniel Sánchez	1,636	(Italy) Marco Zanetti	1,632
163	2016/7	(Egypt) el-Gouna	(South Korea) Heo Jung-han	1,680	(Netherlands) Dick Jaspers	1,852	(Germany) Martin Horn	1,678
163	2016/7	(Egypt) el-Gouna	(South Korea) Heo Jung-han	1,680	(Netherlands) Dick Jaspers	1,852	(Vietnam) Tran Quyet Chien	1,644
164	2017/1	(Turkey) Bursa	(Belgium) Frédéric Caudron	2,105	(Netherlands) Dick Jaspers	2,636	(France) Jérémy Bury	2,274
164	2017/1	(Turkey) Bursa	(Belgium) Frédéric Caudron	2,105	(Netherlands) Dick Jaspers	2,636	(South Korea) Kang Dong-koong	1,536
165	2017/2	(Egypt) Luxor	(Spain) Daniel Sánchez	2,777	(Netherlands) Dick Jaspers	2,540	(Turkey) Tayfun Taşdemir	2,343
165	2017/2	(Egypt) Luxor	(Spain) Daniel Sánchez	2,777	(Netherlands) Dick Jaspers	2,540	(South Korea) Cho Myung-woo	2,073
166	2017/3	(Vietnam) Ho Chi Minh City	(Belgium) Eddy Merckx	1,923	(Sweden) Torbjörn Blomdahl	1,959	(Turkey) Murat Naci Çoklu	1,773
166	2017/3	(Vietnam) Ho Chi Minh City	(Belgium) Eddy Merckx	1,923	(Sweden) Torbjörn Blomdahl	1,959	(Italy) Marco Zanetti	1,728
167	2017/4	(Portugal) Porto	(South Korea) Kim Haeng-jik	1,680	(Vietnam) Nguyen Quoc Nguyen	1,747	(Turkey) Lütfi Çenet	2,052
167	2017/4	(Portugal) Porto	(South Korea) Kim Haeng-jik	1,680	(Vietnam) Nguyen Quoc Nguyen	1,747	(South Korea) Heo Jung-han	1,590
168	2017/5	(South Korea) Cheongju	(South Korea) Kim Haeng-jik	1,923	(Turkey) Murat Naci Çoklu	2,021	(Netherlands) Dick Jaspers	2,112
168	2017/5	(South Korea) Cheongju	(South Korea) Kim Haeng-jik	1,923	(Turkey) Murat Naci Çoklu	2,021	(Turkey) Lütfi Çenet	1,562
169	2017/6	(France) La Baule	(Sweden) Torbjörn Blomdahl	2,020	(Belgium) Frédéric Caudron	1,947	(South Korea) Cho Myung-woo	1,855
169	2017/6	(France) La Baule	(Sweden) Torbjörn Blomdahl	2,020	(Belgium) Frédéric Caudron	1,947	(Vietnam) Ma Xuan Cuong	1,707
170	2017/7	(Egypt) el-Gouna	(Belgium) Eddy Merckx	2,272	(Belgium) Roland Forthomme	1,887	(Italy) Marco Zanetti	1,764
170	2017/7	(Egypt) el-Gouna	(Belgium) Eddy Merckx	2,272	(Belgium) Roland Forthomme	1,887	(Belgium) Frédéric Caudron	1,666
171	2018/1	(Turkey) Antalya	(Belgium) Frédéric Caudron	2,739	(Turkey) Murat Naci Çoklu	1,906	(South Korea) Cho Jae-ho	2,393
171	2018/1	(Turkey) Antalya	(Belgium) Frédéric Caudron	2,739	(Turkey) Murat Naci Çoklu	1,906	(Spain) Daniel Sánchez	1,563
172	2018/2	(Vietnam) Ho Chi Minh City	(Vietnam) Tran Quyet Chien	2,000	(Vietnam) Ngô Đinh Nai	2,072	(Vietnam) Nguyen Quoc Nguyen	1,876
172	2018/2	(Vietnam) Ho Chi Minh City	(Vietnam) Tran Quyet Chien	2,000	(Vietnam) Ngô Đinh Nai	2,072	(Belgium) Frédéric Caudron	1,709
173	2018/3	(Belgium) Blankenberge	(Netherlands) Dick Jaspers	2,061	(Turkey) Semih Saygıner	2,010	(Belgium) Eddy Merckx	2,465
173	2018/3	(Belgium) Blankenberge	(Netherlands) Dick Jaspers	2,061	(Turkey) Semih Saygıner	2,010	(Greece) Nikos Polychronopoulos	2,208
174	2018/4	(Portugal) Porto	(Belgium) Frédéric Caudron	2,380	(Turkey) Tayfun Taşdemir	2,320	(South Korea) Heo Jung-han	1,750
174	2018/4	(Portugal) Porto	(Belgium) Frédéric Caudron	2,380	(Turkey) Tayfun Taşdemir	2,320	(South Korea) Choi Sung-won	1,584
175	2018/5	(France) La Baule	(Germany) Martin Horn	2,020	(South Korea) Cho Jae-ho	1,970	(Belgium) Frédéric Caudron	2,053
175	2018/5	(France) La Baule	(Germany) Martin Horn	2,020	(South Korea) Cho Jae-ho	1,970	(Turkey) Semih Saygıner	1,921
176	2018/6	(South Korea) Seoul	(Belgium) Eddy Merckx	2,000	(Greece) Filippos Kasidokostas	2,057	(Netherlands) Dick Jaspers	1,949
176	2018/6	(South Korea) Seoul	(Belgium) Eddy Merckx	2,000	(Greece) Filippos Kasidokostas	2,057	(South Korea) Kim Bong-chul	1,888
177	2018/7	(Egypt) Hurghada	(Netherlands) Dick Jaspers	2,040	(Belgium) Frédéric Caudron	2,086	(South Korea) Kim Haeng-jik	2,239
177	2018/7	(Egypt) Hurghada	(Netherlands) Dick Jaspers	2,040	(Belgium) Frédéric Caudron	2,086	(Turkey) Semih Saygıner	2,038
178	2019/1	(Turkey) Antalya	(Turkey) Tayfun Taşdemir	1,758	(South Korea) Cho Jae-ho	1,516	(Vietnam) Tran Quyet Chien	1,963
178	2019/1	(Turkey) Antalya	(Turkey) Tayfun Taşdemir	1,758	(South Korea) Cho Jae-ho	1,516	(Turkey) Murat Naci Çoklu	1,746
179	2019/2	(Vietnam) Ho Chi Minh City	(Belgium) Frédéric Caudron	2,368	(Belgium) Roland Forthomme	1,717	(Italy) Marco Zanetti	2,257
179	2019/2	(Vietnam) Ho Chi Minh City	(Belgium) Frédéric Caudron	2,368	(Belgium) Roland Forthomme	1,717	(Belgium) Eddy Merckx	1,770
180	2019/3	(Belgium) Blankenberge	(Spain) Javier Palazón	1,666	(Germany) Martin Horn	1,954	(South Korea) Heo Jung-han	2,090
180	2019/3	(Belgium) Blankenberge	(Spain) Javier Palazón	1,666	(Germany) Martin Horn	1,954	(Sweden) Torbjörn Blomdahl	1,580
181	2019/4	(Portugal) Porto	(Netherlands) Dick Jaspers	2,029	(South Korea) Kim Haeng-jik	1,935	(Turkey) Lütfi Çenet	1,818
181	2019/4	(Portugal) Porto	(Netherlands) Dick Jaspers	2,029	(South Korea) Kim Haeng-jik	1,935	(South Korea) Cho Myung-woo	1,773
182	2019/5	(Netherlands) Veghel	(South Korea) Kim Haeng-jik	1,956	(Turkey) Lütfi Çenet	1,707	(Vietnam) Nguyễn Đức Anh Chiến	1,697
182	2019/5	(Netherlands) Veghel	(South Korea) Kim Haeng-jik	1,956	(Turkey) Lütfi Çenet	1,707	(Spain) Antonio Montes	1,685
183	2019/6	(South Korea) Guri	(Belgium) Eddy Merckx	2,044	(France) Jérémy Bury	1,640	(Turkey) Tayfun Taşdemir	2,018
183	2019/6	(South Korea) Guri	(Belgium) Eddy Merckx	2,044	(France) Jérémy Bury	1,640	(South Korea) Kim Jun-tae	1,331
184	2019/7	(Egypt) Sharm El Sheikh	(Italy) Marco Zanetti	2,718	(Netherlands) Dick Jaspers	2,078	(Germany) Martin Horn	1,691
184	2019/7	(Egypt) Sharm El Sheikh	(Italy) Marco Zanetti	2,718	(Netherlands) Dick Jaspers	2,078	(France) Jérémy Bury	1,791
185	2020/1	(Turkey) Antalya	(Spain) Daniel Sánchez	1,879	(Netherlands) Dick Jaspers	2,276	(South Korea) Kim Haeng-jik	1,827
185	2020/1	(Turkey) Antalya	(Spain) Daniel Sánchez	1,879	(Netherlands) Dick Jaspers	2,276	(Turkey) Murat Naci Çoklu	1,605
186	2021/1	(Netherlands) Veghel	(Spain) Daniel Sánchez	1,757	(South Korea) Heo Jung-han	2,012	(Turkey) Tayfun Taşdemir	1,768
186	2021/1	(Netherlands) Veghel	(Spain) Daniel Sánchez	1,757	(South Korea) Heo Jung-han	2,012	(South Korea) Kim Jun-tae	1,556
187	2021/2	(Egypt) Sharm El Sheikh	(Turkey) Semih Saygıner	1,839	(Netherlands) Dick Jaspers	1,967	(Sweden) Torbjörn Blomdahl	1,875
187	2021/2	(Egypt) Sharm El Sheikh	(Turkey) Semih Saygıner	1,839	(Netherlands) Dick Jaspers	1,967	(South Korea) Choi Sung-won	1,753
188	2022/1	(Turkey) Ankara	(Netherlands) Dick Jaspers	1,842	(Vietnam) Tran Quyet Chien	1,703	(Turkey) Tayfun Taşdemir	1,968
188	2022/1	(Turkey) Ankara	(Netherlands) Dick Jaspers	1,842	(Vietnam) Tran Quyet Chien	1,703	(Italy) Marco Zanetti	1,729
189	2022/2	(United States) Las Vegas	(Netherlands) Dick Jaspers	1,807	(Egypt) Sameh Sidhom	1,701	(France) Jérémy Bury	1,726
189	2022/2	(United States) Las Vegas	(Netherlands) Dick Jaspers	1,807	(Egypt) Sameh Sidhom	1,701	(South Korea) Kim Haeng-jik	1,694
190	2022/3	(Vietnam) Ho Chi Minh City	(Belgium) Eddy Merckx	1,898	(Italy) Marco Zanetti	1,802	(Netherlands) Dick Jaspers	2,101
190	2022/3	(Vietnam) Ho Chi Minh City	(Belgium) Eddy Merckx	1,898	(Italy) Marco Zanetti	1,802	(Sweden) Torbjörn Blomdahl	1,703
191	2022/4	(South Korea) Seoul	(Spain) Daniel Sánchez	2,206	(South Korea) Cha Myeong-jong	1,505	(Netherlands) Dick Jaspers	1,921
191	2022/4	(South Korea) Seoul	(Spain) Daniel Sánchez	2,206	(South Korea) Cha Myeong-jong	1,505	(France) Gwendal Marechal	1,604
192	2022/5	(Netherlands) Veghel	(Sweden) Torbjörn Blomdahl	1,860	(South Korea) Lee Choong-bok	1,515	(Spain) Daniel Sánchez	2,084
192	2022/5	(Netherlands) Veghel	(Sweden) Torbjörn Blomdahl	1,860	(South Korea) Lee Choong-bok	1,515	(Netherlands) Dick Jaspers	1,914
193	2022/6	(Egypt) Sharm El Sheikh	(South Korea) Cho Myung-woo	2,081	(Spain) Daniel Sánchez	2,212	(Italy) Marco Zanetti	2,064
193	2022/6	(Egypt) Sharm El Sheikh	(South Korea) Cho Myung-woo	2,081	(Spain) Daniel Sánchez	2,212	(South Korea) Seo Chang-hoon	1,632
–	2023/1	(Turkey) Ankara	Canceled due to earthquake in Turkey after ppp-qualification					
194	2023/2	(United States) Las Vegas	(Turkey) Tayfun Taşdemir	1,849	(South Korea) Kim Haeng-jik	1,628	(Italy) Marco Zanetti	1,739
194	2023/2	(United States) Las Vegas	(Turkey) Tayfun Taşdemir	1,849	(South Korea) Kim Haeng-jik	1,628	(South Korea) Kim Jun-tae	1,792
195	2023/3	(Vietnam) Ho Chi Minh City	(Sweden) Torbjörn Blomdahl	2,025	(South Korea) Cho Myung-woo	1,839	(South Korea) Kim Jun-tae	1,695
195	2023/3	(Vietnam) Ho Chi Minh City	(Sweden) Torbjörn Blomdahl	2,025	(South Korea) Cho Myung-woo	1,839	(Germany) Martin Horn	1,668
196	2023/4	(Portugal) Porto	(Vietnam) Tran Quyet Chien	1,775	(Egypt) Sameh Sidhom	1,510	(France) Jérémy Bury	1,578
196	2023/4	(Portugal) Porto	(Vietnam) Tran Quyet Chien	1,775	(Egypt) Sameh Sidhom	1,510	(Vietnam) Thai Hong Chiem	1,597
197	2023/5	(Netherlands) Veghel	(Netherlands) Dick Jaspers	2,480	(Germany) Martin Horn	1,870	(Belgium) Eddy Merckx	1,892
197	2023/5	(Netherlands) Veghel	(Netherlands) Dick Jaspers	2,480	(Germany) Martin Horn	1,870	(Netherlands) Jean Paul de Bruijn	1,598
198	2023/6	(South Korea) Seoul	(Belgium) Eddy Merckx	1,896	(South Korea) Cho Myung-woo	2,426	(Italy) Marco Zanetti	1,923
198	2023/6	(South Korea) Seoul	(Belgium) Eddy Merckx	1,896	(South Korea) Cho Myung-woo	2,426	(South Korea) Jeong Ye-sung	1,639
199	2023/7	(Egypt) Sharm El Sheikh	(Netherlands) Dick Jaspers	2,130	(South Korea) Kim Jun-tae	1,703	(Turkey) Tolgahan Kiraz	1,893
199	2023/7	(Egypt) Sharm El Sheikh	(Netherlands) Dick Jaspers	2,130	(South Korea) Kim Jun-tae	1,703	(Netherlands) Glenn Hofman	1,463
200	2024/1	(Colombia) Bogotá	(Vietnam) Tran Quyet Chien	1,693	(Egypt) Sameh Sidhom	1,598	(Netherlands) Glenn Hofman	1,562
200	2024/1	(Colombia) Bogotá	(Vietnam) Tran Quyet Chien	1,693	(Egypt) Sameh Sidhom	1,598	(Spain) Robinson Morales	1,473
201	2024/2	(Vietnam) Ho Chi Minh City	(Vietnam) Tran Duc Minh	1,661	(South Korea) Kim Jun-tae	2,046	(Turkey) Tolgahan Kiraz	1,578
201	2024/2	(Vietnam) Ho Chi Minh City	(Vietnam) Tran Duc Minh	1,661	(South Korea) Kim Jun-tae	2,046	(Turkey) Burak Hashas	1,820
202	2024/3	(Turkey) Ankara	(South Korea) Heo Jung-han	1,839	(Vietnam) Bao Phương Vinh	2,090	(Egypt) Sameh Sidhom	1,610
202	2024/3	(Turkey) Ankara	(South Korea) Heo Jung-han	1,839	(Vietnam) Bao Phương Vinh	2,090	(Germany) Martin Horn	1,715
203	2024/4	(Portugal) Porto	(Netherlands) Dick Jaspers	1,916	(South Korea) Cho Myung-woo	2,048	(Turkey) Tayfun Taşdemir	2,000
203	2024/4	(Portugal) Porto	(Netherlands) Dick Jaspers	1,916	(South Korea) Cho Myung-woo	2,048	(Belgium) Frédéric Caudron	1,814
204	2024/5	(Netherlands) Veghel	(Vietnam) Trần Quyết Chiến	1,916	(Belgium) Frédéric Caudron	1,913	(Belgium) Peter Ceulemans	1,701
204	2024/5	(Netherlands) Veghel	(Vietnam) Trần Quyết Chiến	1,916	(Belgium) Frédéric Caudron	1,913	(Vietnam) Nguyen Tran Thanh Tu	1,734
205	2024/6	(South Korea) Seoul	(Netherlands) Dick Jaspers	2,091	(Turkey) Tayfun Taşdemir	1,636	(South Korea) Cho Myung-woo	2,046
205	2024/6	(South Korea) Seoul	(Netherlands) Dick Jaspers	2,091	(Turkey) Tayfun Taşdemir	1,636	(South Korea) Kim Jun-tae	2,040
206	2024/7	(Egypt) Sharm El Sheikh	(Italy) Marco Zanetti	1,849	(Belgium) Eddy Merckx	1,837	(Sweden) Torbjörn Blomdahl	1,784
206	2024/7	(Egypt) Sharm El Sheikh	(Italy) Marco Zanetti	1,849	(Belgium) Eddy Merckx	1,837	(Vietnam) Thai Hong Chiem	1,456
207	2025/1	(Colombia) Bogotá	(Vietnam) Trần Thanh Lực	1,545	(Turkey) Tayfun Taşdemir	1,601	(Netherlands) Dick Jaspers	1,419
207	2025/1	(Colombia) Bogotá	(Vietnam) Trần Thanh Lực	1,545	(Turkey) Tayfun Taşdemir	1,601	(Turkey) Tolgahan Kiraz	1,443
208	2025/2	(Vietnam) Ho Chi Minh City	(Netherlands) Dick Jaspers	2,302	(South Korea) Heo Jung-han	1,758	(Vietnam) Trần Quyết Chiến	2,061
208	2025/2	(Vietnam) Ho Chi Minh City	(Netherlands) Dick Jaspers	2,302	(South Korea) Heo Jung-han	1,758	(South Korea) Hwang Bong-joo	1,729
209	2025/3	(Turkey) Ankara	(Belgium) Eddy Merckx	1,839	(Vietnam) Trần Quyết Chiến	1,967	(Egypt) Sameh Sidhom	1,784
209	2025/3	(Turkey) Ankara	(Belgium) Eddy Merckx	1,839	(Vietnam) Trần Quyết Chiến	1,967	(Netherlands) Glen Hofman	1,746
210	2025/4	(Portugal) Porto	(South Korea) Cho Myung-woo	1,962	(France) Jérémy Bury	1,903	(Turkey) Gokhan Salman	1,615
210	2025/4	(Portugal) Porto	(South Korea) Cho Myung-woo	1,962	(France) Jérémy Bury	1,903	(Italy) Marco Zanetti	1,505
211	2025/5	(Belgium) Antwerp	(Germany) Martin Horn	1,872	(Turkey) Tayfun Taşdemir	2,013	(Netherlands) Glen Hofman	1,807
211	2025/5	(Belgium) Antwerp	(Germany) Martin Horn	1,872	(Turkey) Tayfun Taşdemir	2,013	(Vietnam) Bao Phương Vinh	1,671
212	2025/6	(South Korea) Gwangju	(South Korea) Cho Myung-woo	1,833	(Italy) Marco Zanetti	1,909	(Belgium) Eddy Merckx	2,590
212	2025/6	(South Korea) Gwangju	(South Korea) Cho Myung-woo	1,833	(Italy) Marco Zanetti	1,909	(Netherlands) Glen Hofman	2,065
213	2025/7	(Egypt) Sharm El Sheikh	(Turkey) Berkay Karakurt	1,758	(Egypt) Sameh Sidhom	1,831	(Netherlands) Dick Jaspers	1,750
213	2025/7	(Egypt) Sharm El Sheikh	(Turkey) Berkay Karakurt	1,758	(Egypt) Sameh Sidhom	1,831	(Belgium) Peter Ceulemans	1,487
214	2026/1	(Colombia) Bogotá	(South Korea) Cho Myung-woo	1,915	(Vietnam) Trần Thanh Lực	1,698	(Germany) Martin Horn	1,562
214	2026/1	(Colombia) Bogotá	(South Korea) Cho Myung-woo	1,915	(Vietnam) Trần Thanh Lực	1,698	(Turkey) Tayfun Taşdemir	1,549
215	2026/2	(Vietnam) Ho Chi Minh City	(Belgium) Frédéric Caudron	1,805	(Vietnam) Thai Hong Chiem	1,755	(Italy) Marco Zanetti	1,890
215	2026/2	(Vietnam) Ho Chi Minh City	(Belgium) Frédéric Caudron	1,805	(Vietnam) Thai Hong Chiem	1,755	(Belgium) Eddy Merckx	2,071
216	2026/3	(Turkey) Ankara	(South Korea) Cho Myung-woo	2,191	(Netherlands) Dick Jaspers	2,071	(Vietnam) Bao Phương Vinh	1,728
216	2026/3	(Turkey) Ankara	(South Korea) Cho Myung-woo	2,191	(Netherlands) Dick Jaspers	2,071	(Italy) Marco Zanetti	1,829
217	2026/4	(Portugal) Matosinhos	(Belgium) Eddy Merckx	1,9877	(South Korea) Heo Jung-han	2,000	(Vietnam) Thai Hong Chiem	1,824
217	2026/4	(Portugal) Matosinhos	(Belgium) Eddy Merckx	1,9877	(South Korea) Heo Jung-han	2,000	(Turkey) Berkay Karakurt	1,976
218	2026/5	(Belgium) Lier	(South Korea) Cho Myung-woo	1,987	(Netherlands) Dick Jaspers	2,109	(Vietnam) Bao Phương Vinh	2,163
218	2026/5	(Belgium) Lier	(South Korea) Cho Myung-woo	1,987	(Netherlands) Dick Jaspers	2,109	(Turkey) Berkay Karakurt	1,952
219	2026/6	(South Korea) Yanggu	(Belgium) Eddy Merckx	2,259	(Netherlands) Glen Hofman	1,836	(Netherlands) Dick Jaspers	1,960
219	2026/6	(South Korea) Yanggu	(Belgium) Eddy Merckx	2,259	(Netherlands) Glen Hofman	1,836	(Turkey) Tayfun Taşdemir	1,636

== World Cup overall champions ==
Single years
Year	Winner
1986	(Belgium) Raymond Ceulemans
1987	(Belgium) Raymond Ceulemans
1988 (Note: The UMB announced the World Cup Champions at the same time as World Champions.)	(Sweden) Torbjörn Blomdahl (UMB)
1989	(Belgium) Ludo Dielis (UMB)
1990	(Belgium) Raymond Ceulemans (UMB)
1991	(Sweden) Torbjörn Blomdahl (UMB)
1992	(Sweden) Torbjörn Blomdahl (UMB)
1993	(United States) Sang Lee (UMB)
1994	(Sweden) Torbjörn Blomdahl
1995	(Sweden) Torbjörn Blomdahl
1995	(Spain) Daniel Sánchez (UMB)
1996	(Sweden) Torbjörn Blomdahl
1996	(Portugal) Jorge Theriaga
1997	(Netherlands) Dick Jaspers
1997	(Germany) Christian Rudolph
1998	(Sweden) Torbjörn Blomdahl
1999	(Netherlands) Dick Jaspers
2001	(Sweden) Torbjörn Blomdahl
2002	not held
2003	– ^{*2}
2004	(Spain) Daniel Sánchez

Single years
Year	Winner
2005	(Belgium) Frédéric Caudron
2006	(Spain) Daniel Sánchez
2007	(Sweden) Torbjörn Blomdahl
2008	(Netherlands) Dick Jaspers
2009	(Belgium) Frédéric Caudron
2010	(Netherlands) Dick Jaspers
2011	(Sweden) Torbjörn Blomdahl
2012	– ^{*2}
2013	(Sweden) Torbjörn Blomdahl
2014	(Belgium) Frédéric Caudron
2015	(Spain) Daniel Sánchez
2016	(Netherlands) Dick Jaspers
2017	(South Korea) Kim Haeng-jik
2018	(Belgium) Frédéric Caudron
2019	(Netherlands) Dick Jaspers
2020	–
2021	–
2022	(Netherlands) Dick Jaspers
2023	(Netherlands) Dick Jaspers
2024	(Netherlands) Dick Jaspers
2025	(South Korea) Cho Myung-woo

Eternal list
Place	Name	No.	Years
1	(Sweden) Torbjörn Blomdahl	11	1988, 1991, 1992, 1994, 1995, 1996, 1998, 2001, 2007, 2011, 2013
2	(Netherlands) Dick Jaspers	9	1997, 1999, 2008, 2010, 2016, 2019, 2022, 2023, 2024
3	(Spain) Daniel Sánchez	4	1995, 2004, 2006, 2015
3	(Belgium) Frédéric Caudron	4	2005, 2009, 2014, 2018
5	(Belgium) Raymond Ceulemans	3	1986, 1987, 1990
6	(Belgium) Ludo Dielis	1	1989
6	(United States) Sang Lee	1	1993
6	(Portugal) Jorge Theriaga	1	1996
6	(Germany) Christian Rudolph	1	1997
6	(South Korea) Kim Haeng-jik	1	2017
6	(South Korea) Cho Myung-woo	1	2025

== List of World Cup single event winners ==
Date: November 8, 2026

Name	Wins
(Sweden) Torbjörn Blomdahl	46
(Netherlands) Dick Jaspers	32
(Belgium) Frédéric Caudron	22
(Belgium) Eddy Merckx	16
(Spain) Daniel Sánchez	15
(Belgium) Raymond Ceulemans	9
(Turkey) Semih Saygıner	7
(South Korea) Cho Myung-woo	6
(United States) Sang Lee	5
(Italy) Marco Zanetti	5
(Vietnam) Tran Quyet Chien	4
(Japan) Nobuaki Kobayashi	3
(Belgium) Ludo Dielis	3
(Germany) Martin Horn	3
(Turkey) Tayfun Taşdemir	3
(South Korea) Kim Haeng-jik	3
(Netherlands) Rini van Bracht	2
(Portugal) Jorge Theriaga	2
(Denmark) Dion Nelin	2
(Germany) Christian Rudolph	2
(Belgium) Roland Forthomme	2
(Turkey) Murat Naci Çoklu	2
(South Korea) Heo Jung-han	2

Name	Wins
(Portugal) Egidio Vierat	1
(Japan) Junichi Komori	1
(Belgium) Laurent Boulanger	1
(France) Richard Bitalis	1
(Belgium) Koen Ceulemans	1
(Austria) Christoph Pilss	1
(Switzerland) Andreas Efler	1
(Denmark) Hans Laursen	1
(Belgium) Francis Forton	1
(Netherlands) Raimond Burgman	1
(Turkey) Yilmaz Özcan	1
(Belgium) Jozef Philipoom	1
(South Korea) Kim Kyung-roul	1
(Greece) Filippos Kasidokostas	1
(Turkey) Adnan Yüksel	1
(South Korea) Choi Sung-won	1
(South Korea) Kang Dong-koong	1
(South Korea) Cho Jae-ho	1
(France) Jérémy Bury	1
(Spain) Javier Palazón	1
(Vietnam) Tran Duc Minh	1
(Vietnam) Trần Thanh Lực	1
(Turkey) Berkay Karakurt	1

== The best Worldcup-Players (by Ranking-Points) ==
Date: November 8, 2026

Rank	Name	WRP	Matches	W	T	L	MP	Pts.	Inn.	GA	SA	HR	World- cups	1st	2nd	3rd
1.	(Sweden) Torbjörn Blomdahl	6243	656	478	3	175	959:353	29879	17887	1,670	4,000	26	192	46	19	28
2.	(Netherlands) Dick Jaspers	6071	670	490	8	172	984:352	30148	16979	1,775	5,000	24	182	32	24	26
3.	(Belgium) Frédéric Caudron	4420	467	331	3	135	665:273	21698	12923	1,679	5,714	19	147	22	13	18
4.	(Italy) Marco Zanetti	3942	581	342	11	228	695:467	25225	16053	1,571	3,636	19	202	5	11	26
5.	(Spain) Daniel Sánchez	3706	446	306	3	137	615:277	20044	12388	1,618	4,444	19	146	15	12	17
6.	(Belgium) Eddy Merckx	3355	437	276	6	155	558:316	18008	11018	1,634	5,714	21	148	16	2	16
7.	(Turkey) Tayfun Taşdemir	2409	342	189	14	139	392:292	13846	8433	1,641	4,444	20	129	3	7	13
8.	(Turkey) Semih Saygıner	2337	300	187	4	109	378:222	13532	8826	1,533	6,666	17	111	7	7	16
9.	(Germany) Martin Horn	2169	326	188	4	135	380:274	13725	9068	1,513	3,333	19	120	3	7	10
10.	(France) Jérémy Bury	1922	291	143	9	139	295:287	11211	7289	1,538	4,444	24	119	1	5	11
11.	(Belgium) Roland Forthomme	1892	249	123	3	123	249:249	9761	6530	1,494	4,000	18	137	2	5	3
12.	(Greece) Nikos Polychronopoulos	1720	252	121	5	126	247:257	10438	7025	1,485	4,444	25	135	0	3	3
13.	(Belgium) Raymond Ceulemans	1658	218	148	0	70	296:140	10583	7485	1,413	2,647	15	76	9	15	11
14.	(South Korea) Heo Jung-han	1548	246	121	5	120	247:245	9015	5468	1,648	5,000	22	93	2	3	3
15.	(Vietnam) Trần Quyết Chiến	1533	231	131	9	91	271:191	8716	5185	1,681	4,444	22	75	4	3	3
16.	(South Korea) Cho Myung-woo	1509	212	133	7	72	273:151	8235	4559	1,806	4,000	25	71	6	3	5
17.	(Turkey) Murat Naci Çoklu	1453	189	89	5	95	183:195	7188	4703	1,528	3,333	15	98	2	3	4
18.	(South Korea) Kim Heang-jik	1426	223	119	10	94	248:198	8355	4868	1,716	4,000	19	82	3	3	3
19.	(Egypt) Sameh Sidhom	1318	227	107	12	108	226:228	8398	5465	1,536	3,333	19	95	0	4	2
20.	(South Korea) Choi Sung-won	1266	165	89	0	76	178:152	6345	4172	1,520	3,636	19	73	1	1	4
21.	(Belgium) Eddy Leppens	1204	176	79	0	96	158:192	7353	5486	1,340	5,714	20	118	0	3	5
22.	(United States) Sang Chun Lee	1135	143	94	0	49	188:98	7008	4984	1,406	2,812	14	50	5	4	6
23.	(South Korea) Cho Jae-ho	1085	130	68	2	60	136:120	4883	2870	1,701	4,444	21	62	1	3	5
	(South Korea) Kim Kyung-roul	1085	119	71	0	48	142:96	5671	3713	1,526	3,105	15	50	1	2	7
25.	(Turkey) Lütfi Çenet	1064	138	65	2	71	132:146	5088	3375	1,507	4,000	17	77	0	2	5
26.	(Greece) Filipos Kasidokostas	1039	114	61	0	53	122:106	5275	3452	1,528	2,857	18	66	1	2	5
27.	(Germany) Christian Rudolph	1005	153	80	0	73	160:146	6927	5606	1,235	2,944	13	96	2	2	4
28.	(Denmark) Tonny Carlsen	983	148	77	0	71	154:142	6789	5202	1,305	3,750	14	91	0	3	2
29.	(Denmark) Dion Nelin	931	151	85	2	64	172:130	6594	4802	1,373	2,666	17	68	2	2	5
30.	(Netherlands) Jean Paul de Bruijn	900	99	40	0	59	80:118	3865	2941	1,314	3,076	15	94	0	0	4
31.	(Spain) Rubén Legazpi	853	127	53	7	67	113:141	4806	3217	1,493	3,846	20	77	0	1	1
32.	(Belgium) Ludo Dielis	825	133	80	0	53	160:106	6540	5200	1,257	2,500	14	52	3	4	7
33.	(South Korea) Kang-Doong-kong	817	91	44	0	46	88:92	3189	2031	1,570	3,636	15	55	1	1	1
34.	(Netherlands) Raimond Burgman	788	120	66	0	54	132:108	5518	3867	1,426	2,368	15	62	1	0	7
35.	(Turkey) Adnan Yüksel	776	94	30	0	64	60:128	3884	3001	1,294	3,076	21	97	1	1	0
36.	(Spain) Javier Palazón	730	71	33	1	37	67:75	2777	2018	1,376	3,333	16	68	1	0	1
37.	(Belgium) Peter Ceulemans	688	115	52	5	58	109:121	4233	2806	1,508	3,636	19	73	0	0	3
38.	(France) Richard Bitalis	675	117	61	0	56	122:112	5538	4494	1,232	2,304	13	51	1	2	4
39.	(Belgium) Peter de Backer	670	97	47	0	50	94:100	4502	3612	1,246	2,500	12	68	0	1	2
40.	(Netherlands) Glenn Hofman	654	94	47	1	46	95:93	3543	2271	1,560	4,444	17	68	0	1	5
41.	(Belgium) Jozef Philipoom	637	70	35	0	35	70:70	3350	2559	1,309	2,400	12	64	1	2	0
42.	(South Korea) Kim Jun-tae	634	113	68	5	40	141:85	4283	2526	1,695	5,000	28	36	0	2	4
43.	(Turkey) Tolgahan Kiraz	611	93	41	6	46	88:98	3384	2327	1,454	2,857	17	64	0	0	3
44.	(Vietnam) Nguyễn Quốc Nguyện	602	83	38	0	45	76:90	2765	1758	1,572	3,076	20	43	0	1	3
45.	(Portugal) Jorge Theriaga	569	108	62	0	46	124:92	5096	4277	1,191	2,368	14	54	2	4	2
46.	(Austria) Gerhard Kostistansky	562	68	23	0	45	46:90	2651	2302	1,151	2,105	13	94	0	0	0
47.	(South Korea) Lee Choong-bok	549	65	29	2	34	60:70	2510	1624	1,545	2,857	15	49	0	1	1
48.	(Turkey) Berkay Karakurt	540	98	53	8	37	114:82	3675	2329	1,577	4,000	14	32	1	0	2
49.	(Japan) Junichi Komori	539	127	62	0	65	124:130	6402	5372	1,191	2,045	13	66	1	3	5
50.	(Austria) Andreas Efler	496	84	40	0	44	80:88	3932	3405	1,154	2,142	15	68	1	0	1

Players who are banned from UMB competitions

== Other 5 best active UMB World Cup participants (according to ranking points) ==
Rank	Name	WRP	Matches	W	T	L	MP	Pts.	Inn.	GA	SA	HR	World- cups	1st	2nd	3rd
51.	(Vietnam) Trần Thanh Lực	494	94	49	4	41	102:86	3519	2267	1,552	3,333	22	28	1	1	0
52.	(Turkey) Gokhan Salman	490	64	25	4	35	54:74	2169	1484	1,461	3,076	16	75	0	0	1
53.	(Turkey) Birol Uymaz	488	57	21	3	33	45:69	1933	1273	1,518	3,076	16	62	0	0	0
54.	(Japan) Ryūji Umeda	481	69	21	1	47	43:95	2951	2447	1,205	2,250	12	60	0	0	0
55.	(Vietnam) Bao Phương Vinh	479	103	48	5	50	101:105	3786	2291	1,652	10,000	25	30	0	1	3

Annotation 1: WRP: Are the world ranking points (formerly only ranking points) (also the points from the qualification)
Annotation 2: GA: Only the results of the final round were counted
Annotation 3: Different world ranking points were awarded up to the 2004/2 three-cushion World Cup tournament. This puts the players in the first 98 tournaments at a disadvantage
Annotation 4: On the German Wikipedia Worldcup page (Dreiband-Weltcup), the converted ranking points based on the current World Cup standings (Dreiband-Weltcup 2019/1) are listed separately for each World Cup year.
