= 2022 UMB World Three-cushion Championship for National Teams =

Tournament information
- Sport: Carom billiards
- Location: (Germany) Viersen
- Dates: 10 March–13 March
- Teams: 16

Final positions
- Champions: Turkey
- Runner-up: Colombia

The 2022 UMB World Three-cushion Championship for National Teams 2022 was the 34th edition of the tournament. It was held from 10 March to 13 March in Viersen, Germany, the permanent location of the championship since 1990.

== Format ==
Since 2016, only 16 teams take part to the tournament. The defending champions and the host country are seeded. In the group stage, up to 40 points are played and draws are possible. From the knockout round, there is an extra time in the Scotch Doubles System (SD) in the event of a draw. All four players play in alternating mode up to 15 points. The team that first reaches 15 points wins the match. Group ranking is determined as follows:

- Matchpoints (MP)
- Team General Average (MGD)
- Maximum series (HS)

Since 2004, 3rd place final is not played.

== Participants ==
| Nation | Group | Player 1 | Player 2 |
|---|---|---|---|
| 01. Turkey | B | Tayfun Taşdemir | Can Çapak |
| 02. Germany | D | Martin Horn | Ronny Lindemann |
| 03. Spain | D | Dani Sánchez | Rubén Legazpi |
| 04. France | C | Mickaël Devogelaere | Maxime Panaia |
| 05. Denmark | B | Dion Nelin | Jacob Sørensen |
| 06. Belgium | D | Eddy Merckx | Peter Ceulemans |
| 07. Netherlands | C | Dick Jaspers | Raimond Burgman |
| 08. Greece | A | Nikos Polychronopoulos | Kostantinos Kokkoris |
| 09. Czech Republic | B | Martin Bohac | Ivo Gazdos |
| 10. Peru | D | Guido Sacco | Christopher Tevez |
| 11. Colombia | C | Pedro Gonzalez | Huberney Cataño |
| 12. Vietnam | C | Trần Quyết Chiến | Nguyễn Đức Anh Chiến |
| 13. South Korea | A | Seo Chang-hoon | Kim Haeng-jik |
| 14. Japan | A | Takao Miyashita | Ryūji Umeda |
| 15. Egypt | B | Sameh Sidhom | Youssef Ossama |
| 16. Jordan | A | Abu Tayeh Mashhour | Naser Awwad |

== Group stage ==
=== Results ===
==== Group A ====
Standings
| Pos. | Nation | P | W-D-L | MP | GP | Gen-Av | Best Av. | HR |
|---|---|---|---|---|---|---|---|---|
| 1 | South Korea | 3 | 2-1-0 | 5 | 10 | 1.329 | 1.659 | 14 |
| 2 | Japan | 3 | 2-1-0 | 5 | 10 | 1.244 | 1.355 | 9 |
| 3 | Greece | 3 | 1-0-2 | 2 | 4 | 1.061 | 1.230 | 6 |
| 4 | Jordan | 3 | 0-0-3 | 0 | 0 | 0.867 | - | 7 |

Ergebnisse
| Day | Nation 1 | Av. | MP | GP | Av. | Nation 2 |
|---|---|---|---|---|---|---|
| 10.3.2022 18:00h | South Korea | 1.038 | 2:0 | 4:0 | 0.740 | Jordan |
| 10.3.2022 18:00h | Greece | 0.813 | 0:2 | 0:4 | 1.355 | Japan |
| 11.3.2022 16:00h | South Korea | 1.659 | 1:1 | 2:2 | 1.255 | Japan |
| 11.3.2022 16:00h | Jordan | 0.969 | 0:2 | 0:4 | 1.230 | Greece |
| 12.3.2022 13:30h | South Korea | 1.454 | 2:0 | 4:0 | 1.127 | Greece |
| 12.3.2022 13:30h | Jordan | 0.914 | 0:2 | 0:4 | 1.142 | Japan |

==== Group B ====
Standings
| Pos. | Nation | P | W-D-L | MP | GP | Gen-Av | Best Av. | HR |
|---|---|---|---|---|---|---|---|---|
| 1 | Turkey | 3 | 2-1-0 | 5 | 10 | 1.720 | 1.951 | 12 |
| 2 | Denmark | 3 | 1-2-0 | 4 | 8 | 1.489 | 1.702 | 15 |
| 3 | Egypt | 3 | 1-0-2 | 2 | 4 | 1.209 | 1.142 | 8 |
| 4 | Czech Republic | 3 | 0-1-2 | 1 | 2 | 1.189 | 1.490 | 8 |

Ergebnisse
| Day | Nation 1 | Av. | MP | GP | Av. | Nation 2 |
|---|---|---|---|---|---|---|
| 10.3.2022 16:00h | Turkey | 1.951 | 2:0 | 4:0 | 1.365 | Czech Republic |
| 10.3.2022 16:00h | Denmark | 1.702 | 2:0 | 4:0 | 1.340 | Egypt |
| 11.3.2022 14:00h | Turkey | 1.644 | 1:1 | 2:2 | 1.444 | Denmark |
| 11.3.2022 14:00h | Czech Republic | 0.857 | 0:2 | 0:4 | 1.142 | Egypt |
| 12.3.2022 11:00h | Turkey | 1.600 | 2:0 | 4:0 | 1.180 | Egypt |
| 12.3.2022 11:00h | Czech Republic | 1.490 | 1:1 | 2:2 | 1.339 | Denmark |

==== Group C ====
Standings
| Pos. | Nation | P | W-D-L | MP | GP | Gen-Av | Best Av. | HR |
|---|---|---|---|---|---|---|---|---|
| 1 | Vietnam | 3 | 2-1-0 | 5 | 10 | 1.986 | 2.105 | 13 |
| 2 | Colombia | 3 | 2-1-0 | 5 | 10 | 1.476 | 1.600 | 8 |
| 3 | Netherlands | 3 | 1-0-2 | 2 | 4 | 1.380 | 1.632 | 18 |
| 4 | France | 3 | 0-0-3 | 0 | 0 | 0.866 | - | 6 |

Ergebnisse
| Day | Nation 1 | Av. | MP | GP | Av. | Nation 2 |
|---|---|---|---|---|---|---|
| 10.3.2022 14:00h | Netherlands | 1.534 | 0:2 | 0:4 | 1.860 | Vietnam |
| 10.3.2022 14:00h | France | 0.854 | 0:2 | 0:4 | 1.454 | Colombia |
| 11.3.2022 11:00h | Vietnam | 1.750 | 1:1 | 2:2 | 1.363 | Colombia |
| 11.3.2022 11:00h | Netherlands | 1.632 | 2:0 | 4:0 | 0.857 | France |
| 11.3.2022 20:00h | Vietnam | 2.105 | 2:0 | 4:0 | 0.894 | France |
| 11.3.2022 20:00h | Netherlands | 1.000 | 0:2 | 0:4 | 1.600 | Colombia |

==== Group D ====
Standings
| Pos. | Nation | P | W-D-L | MP | GP | Gen-Av | Best Av. | HR |
|---|---|---|---|---|---|---|---|---|
| 1 | Spain | 3 | 2-1-0 | 5 | 10 | 1.557 | 1.600 | 8 |
| 2 | Germany | 3 | 2-0-1 | 4 | 8 | 1.385 | 2.162 | 20 |
| 3 | Belgium | 3 | 0-2-1 | 2 | 4 | 1.433 | 1.437 | 9 |
| 4 | Peru | 3 | 0-1-2 | 1 | 2 | 1.028 | 1.291 | 7 |

Ergebnisse
| Day | Nation 1 | Av. | MP | GP | Av. | Nation 2 |
|---|---|---|---|---|---|---|
| 10.3.2022 12:00h | Belgium | 1,352 | 1:1 | 2:2 | 1,411 | Spain |
| 10.3.2022 12:00h | Germany | 1,052 | 2:0 | 4:0 | 0,894 | Peru |
| 10.3.2022 20:00h | Spain | 1,666 | 2:0 | 4:0 | 1,340 | Germany |
| 10.3.2022 20:00h | Belgium | 1,437 | 1:1 | 2:2 | 1,291 | Peru |
| 11.3.2022 18:00h | Spain | 1,600 | 2:0 | 4:0 | 0,980 | Peru |
| 11.3.2022 18:00h | Belgium | 1,540 | 0:2 | 0:4 | 2,162 | Germany |

== Final round ==
Quarterfinals
Vietnam | 0 | 0 | 1,441 | 8 | -
Germany | 2 | 4 | 1,860 | 11 | -
South Korea | 0 | 2 | 1,437 | 12 | 7
Colombia | 2 | 2 | 1,208 | 5 | 15
Turkey | 2 | 4 | 1,538 | 9 | -
Denmark | 0 | 0 | 0,865 | 5 | -
Spain | 2 | 4 | 1,860 | 7 | -
Japan | 0 | 0 | 1,069 | 6 | -

Semifinals
Germany | 0 | 0 | 1,211 | 7 | -
Colombia | 2 | 4 | 1,538 | 7 | -
Turkey | 2 | 4 | 2,051 | 7 | -
Spain | 0 | 0 | 1,538 | 9 | -

Final
Colombia | 0 | 0 | 1,234 | 5 | -
Turkey | 2 | 4 | 1,702 | 7 | -

== See also ==
- 2022 UMB World Three-cushion Championship
