= AGIPI Billiard Masters =

Logo of the tournament

The AGIPI Billiard Masters was a three-cushion billiards tournament which was held annually in Schiltigheim, France between 2008 and 2013.

In 2008 the invitational tournament for the best three-cushion players in the world has started. The games were broadcast live on the television by Eurosport 2 and streamed on the internet by Kozoom.

The last champion was "The Italian Gentleman" Marco Zanetti, who defeated Frédéric Caudron from Belgium in the final with 50–40 in 30 innings.

== Mode ==
The first edition was played in four groups of five players. The two best of each group qualified for the final round with two groups of four players. The two group winners qualified for the semifinals, and the semifinal winners contested the final. The game was played to 50 points. Since 2009 the last 8 players played quarter-finals, semi-finals and finals.

The 2012 tournament started with 28 participants. 8 players were set for the two qualifying groups before the quarter-finals. The rest had to qualify through qualifying rounds, a third place was also awarded.

== Prize money ==
Unlike most other three-cushion billiards tournaments, players of the AGIPI Masters got paid according to a bonus-system. In addition to the fixed sum of prize money for his corresponding ranking, a player could get additional bonus. The following list shows the bonus of the 2013 competition:

Place/Record	Prize money
Finale round
Winner	€20,000
Runner-up	€8,000
Semi-finalist	€3,000
Quarter-finalist	€1,500
Groups A–D
Win	€500
Draw	€375
Loss	€250
Bonus for each qualifier	€450
Qualification
Win	€300
Draw	€225
Loss	€150
Bonuses
High run (HR)
HR = 10–14	€500
HR = 15–19	€750
HR = 20 ≥	€1,000
Best Game (BG)
BG 20 ≤ Inngs.	€500
World records *^{1}
HR ≤ 28	€10,000
BG (50 Pts. in ≤ 5 Inngs.)	€10,000
Tournament records *^{1}
HR ≤ 23	€2,500
BG (50 Pts. in ≤ 11 Inngs.)	€2,500

Note

- *^{1} These bonuses could not be combined

In total

- 2008: €121,450
- 2009: €124,450
- 2010: €116,800
- 2011: €127,800
- 2012: €123,400
- 2013: €109,600

== Tournament statistics ==
The GA gives the general-average of the player during the tournament. The following numbers show the high-run (HR) and the total prize money (PM).

No.	Year	Winner	GA / HR / PM	Runner-up	GA / HR / PM	Semi-finalist (3.)	GA / HR / PM	Semi-finalist (4.)	GA / HR / PM	Ref.
1	2008	(Sweden) Torbjörn Blomdahl	2,048 / 11 / €28,050	(Netherlands) Dick Jaspers	2,211 / 22 / €28,900	(Belgium) Frédéric Caudron	1,796 / 12 / €13,500	(Turkey) Semih Saygıner	1,510 / 18 / €12,250	
2	2009	(Netherlands) Dick Jaspers	1,954 / 20 / €20,550	(Sweden) Torbjörn Blomdahl	1,665 / 12 / €14,450	(Belgium) Frédéric Caudron	1,854 / 15 / €12,850	(Belgium) Roland Forthomme	1,624 / 11 / €10,300	
3	2010	(Netherlands) Dick Jaspers	2,096 / 11 / €29,200	(Belgium) Frédéric Caudron	2,399 / 11 / €22,950	(Italy) Marco Zanetti	1,958 / 19 / €10,500	(Belgium) Roland Forthomme	1,535 / 15 / €6,900	
4	2011	(South Korea) Choi Sung-won	1,666 / 12 / €25,350	(France) Jérémy Bury	2,106 / 15 / €13,950	(Greece) Filippos Kasidokostas	1,923 / 21 / €8,200	(Italy) Marco Zanetti	2,057 / 12 / €9,950	
5	2012	(Sweden) Torbjörn Blomdahl	1,953 / 20 / €27,200	(South Korea) Kim Kyung-roul	1,865 / 12 / €13,200	(Germany) Martin Horn	2,157 / 17 / €9,950	(South Korea) Choi Sung-won	1,724 / 13 / €7,950	
6	2013	(Italy) Marco Zanetti	1,915 / 16 / €24,450	(Belgium) Frédéric Caudron	2,165 / 20 / €13,450	(Netherlands) Dick Jaspers	1,943 / 11 / €6,825	(South Korea) Cho Jae-ho	1,815 / 12 / €6,950	
