= Jozef Philipoom =

Belgian carom billiards player (born 1964)

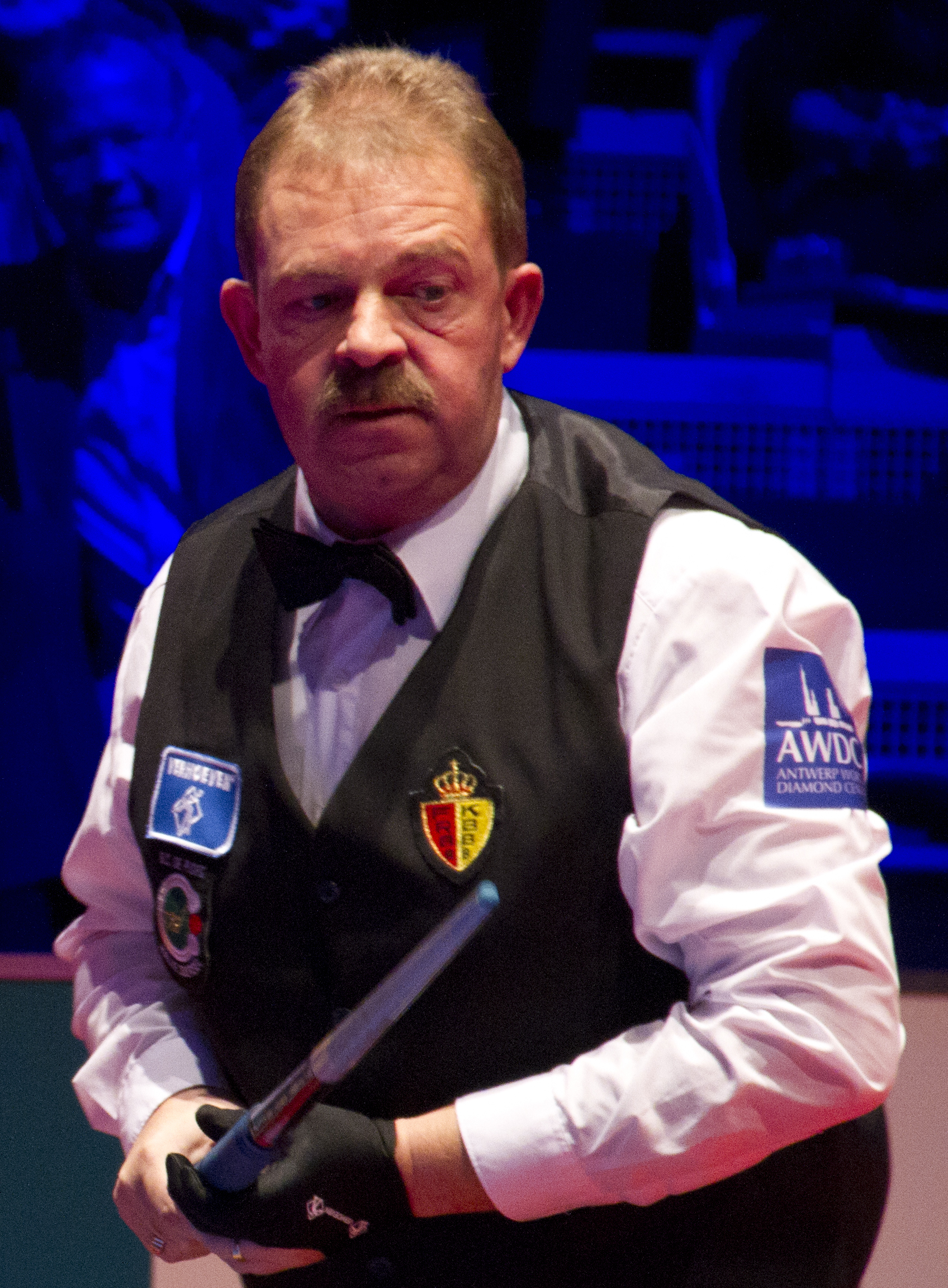
- Philipoom in 2013 27 May 1964 (age 62)

Medal record

Men's three-cushion billiards

Representing Belgium

World Championship
Gold medal – first place	1995 Grubbenvorst	Three-cushion

European Championship
Gold medal – first place	1995 Prague	Individual

World Cup
Silver medal – second place	1996/2 Porto	Individual
Silver medal – second place	2009/1 Sluiskil	Individual
Gold medal – first place	2009/5 Hurghada	Individual

Jozef Bel Philipoom (born 27 May 1964) is a Belgian carom billiards player. He won at the UMB World Three-cushion Championship in 1995. Philipoom also won at the CEB European Three-cushion Championship in 1995. He got into first place once and second place twice at the Three-Cushion World Cup from 1996 to 2009. Philipoom had a match with Eddy Leppens in 2011. He had one child, Luca.
