= Cue sports at the 2006 Asian Games – Men's three-cushion singles =

Men's three-cushion singles at the 2006 Asian Games
- Venue: Al-Sadd Multi-Purpose Hall
- Dates: 7–8 December 2006
- Competitors: 16 from 9 nations

Medalists
gold medal	Ryuji Umeda	Japan
silver medal	Dương Anh Vũ	Vietnam
bronze medal	Kim Kyung-roul	South Korea

The men's three-cushion billiards singles tournament at the 2006 Asian Games in Doha took place from 7 December to 8 December at Al-Sadd Multi-Purpose Hall.

== Schedule ==
All times are Arabia Standard Time (UTC+03:00)

Date	Time	Event
Thursday, 7 December 2006	10:00	Round of 16
Thursday, 7 December 2006	19:30	Quarterfinals
Friday, 8 December 2006	10:00	Quarterfinals
Friday, 8 December 2006	13:00	Semifinals
Friday, 8 December 2006	19:00	Finals

== Results ==
Legend

- WO — Won by walkover

Round of 16
1	Kim Kyung-roul (KOR)	40
Chang Chien-wen (TPE)	27
Batbayaryn Dorjsüren (MGL)
Tatsuo Arai (JPN)	WO
Balachandra Bhaskar (IND)	WO
Udon Khaimuk (THA)
Dương Anh Vũ (VIE)	40
4	Reynaldo Grandea (PHI)	18
3	Ryuji Umeda (JPN)	40
Pauk Sa (MYA)	16
Thawat Sujaritthurakarn (THA)	4
Yuan Yung-kuo (TPE)	40
Lý Thế Vinh (VIE)	40
Ranjan Kosaraju (IND)	10
Batbekhiin Bayarkhüü (MGL)
2	Park Choon-woo (KOR)	WO

Quarterfinals
1	Kim Kyung-roul (KOR)	40
Tatsuo Arai (JPN)	35
Balachandra Bhaskar (IND)	14
Dương Anh Vũ (VIE)	40
3	Ryuji Umeda (JPN)	40
Yuan Yung-kuo (TPE)	27
Lý Thế Vinh (VIE)	35
2	Park Choon-woo (KOR)	40

Semifinals
1	Kim Kyung-roul (KOR)	38
Dương Anh Vũ (VIE)	40
3	Ryuji Umeda (JPN)	40
2	Park Choon-woo (KOR)	15

Gold medal match
Dương Anh Vũ (VIE)	29
3	Ryuji Umeda (JPN)	40
Bronze medal match
1	Kim Kyung-roul (KOR)	40
2	Park Choon-woo (KOR)	15
