= Choi Sung-won (billiards player) =

South Korean professional billiards player

- Hangul: 최성원
- RR: Choe Seongwon
- MR: Ch'oe Sŏngwŏn

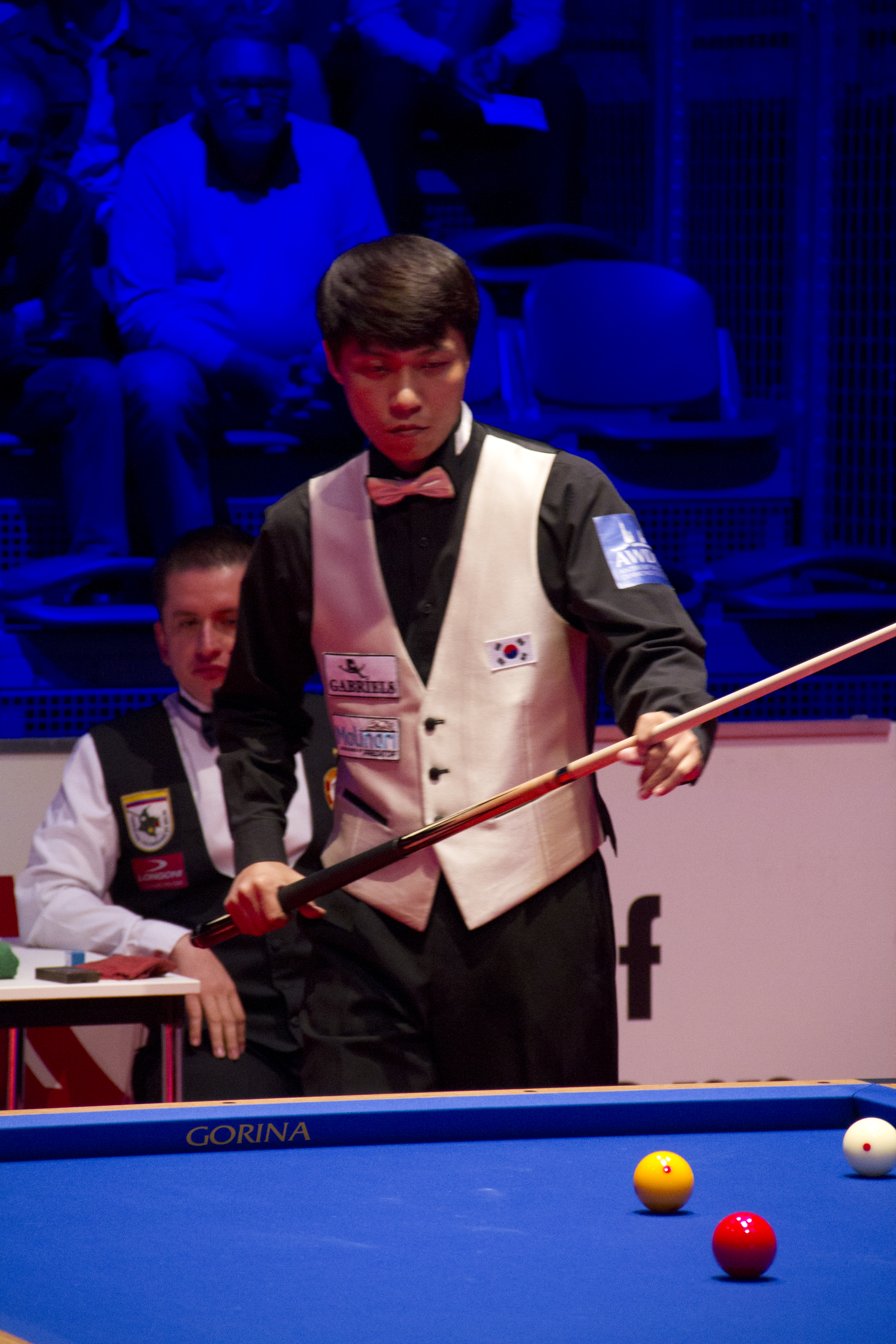
Choi Sung-won

Choi Sung-won (Korean: 최성원, born April 30, 1977) is a South Korean professional billiards player.

He won the 2011 AGIPI Billiard Masters, 2012 Three-Cushion World Cup, 2014 UMB World Three-cushion Championship.

In the final of the UMB World Championship, Choi defeated Torbjorn Blomdahl 40–37.
