= Junichi Komori =

Japanese 3-cushion billiards player and world champion

Junichi Komori (小森 純一, Komori Jun-ichi) (11 July 1941 – 26 July 2015) was a Japanese three-cushion billiards player.

Komori has won 4 Japanese titles. However, he never won an individual world title, finishing in third position at the UMB World Three-cushion Championship on three occasions, in 1976, 1978 and 1985. Along with Nobuaki Kobayashi he won the UMB World Three-cushion Championship for National Teams three times, in 1981, 1985 and 1992.

In 1993, he set a world record by achieving a high run of 28, breaking the previous record of 25 set by Willie Hoppe. This was eventually surpassed by Semih Sayginer and Hugo Patiño who both achieved 31.

He also achieved a 3.333 game average.

In 2015 he died of cancer just two weeks after his 74th birthday.
