= Jorge Theriaga =

Portuguese carom billiards player

Medal record

Men's three-cushion billiards

Representing Portugal

World Cup
Gold medal – first place	1996 World Cup	Individual

CEB European Championship
Bronze medal – third place	1986 Mondorf-les-Bains	Individual
Bronze medal – third place	1995 Prague	Individual
Bronze medal – third place	1999 Porto	Individual

Jorge Theriaga is a Portuguese carom billiards player. He won twice at the Three-Cushion World Cup from 1994 to 1996. Theriaga got into second place four times and third place twice at the Three-Cushion World Cup from 1995 to 1999. He got into third place three times at the CEB European Three-cushion Championship from 1986 to 1999. Theriaga was preferred as a 19-time champion in Portuguese, according to the cited Kozoom article.
