= 2022 UMB World Three-cushion Championship =

Tournament information
- Sport: Carom billiards
- Dates: 9–13 November 2022
- Host(s): (South Korea) Donghae City

The 2022 UMB World Three-cushion Championship is the 74th edition of the tournament. It takes place from 9 to 13 November 2022 in Donghae City, South Korea.

== See also ==
- 2022 UMB World Three-cushion Championship for National Teams
