= Dion Nelin =

Danish carom billiards player (born 1976)

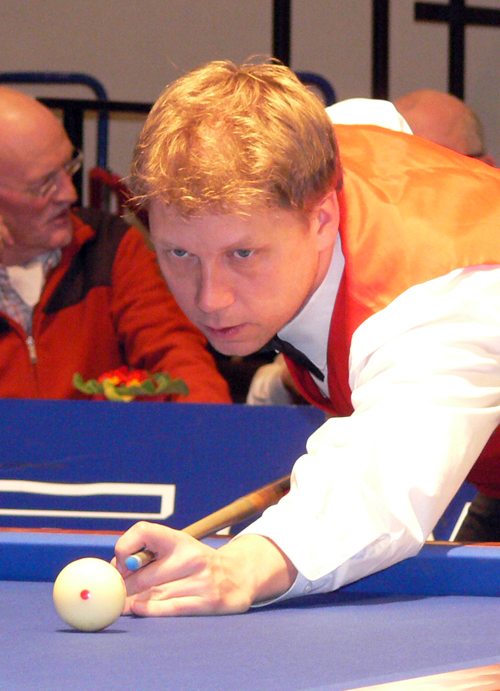
- Nelin in 2011 28 August 1976 (age 50)

Medal record

Men's three-cushion billiards

Representing Denmark

World Cup
Bronze medal – third place	1995/5 Hooglede	Individual
Gold medal – first place	1996/2 Porto	Individual
Bronze medal – third place	1997/2 Salsomaggiore Terme	Individual
Gold medal – first place	1997/3 Porto	Individual
Silver medal – second place	1998/1 Barendrecht	Individual
Bronze medal – third place	1998/3 Lisbon	Individual
Bronze medal – third place	1998/10 Roermond	Individual
Bronze medal – third place	2000/1 Bogotá	Individual
Silver medal – second place	2000/2 Oosterhout	Individual

World Championship
Silver medal – second place	2002 Randers	Three-cushion

Dion Nelin (born 28 August 1976) is a Danish carom billiards player. He won twice at the Three-Cushion World Cup from 1996 to 1997. Nelin got into second place three times and third place five times at the Three-Cushion World Cup from 1995 to 2000. He placed second place at the UMB World Three-cushion Championship in 2002. Nelin was preferred as a best ranked player in Danish, according to the cited Kozoom article. Dan Johansen had helped out Nelin. He spend his summer with a working job, in which Nelin was participant of the Danish Championship.
