= Yanggu =

Yanggu may refer to:

- Yanggu County, Shandong (阳谷县), of Liaocheng, Shandong, China
- Yanggu County, Gangwon (楊口郡), county of Gangwon Province, South Korea
