= Nikos Polychronopoulos =

Greek carom billiards player (born 1978)

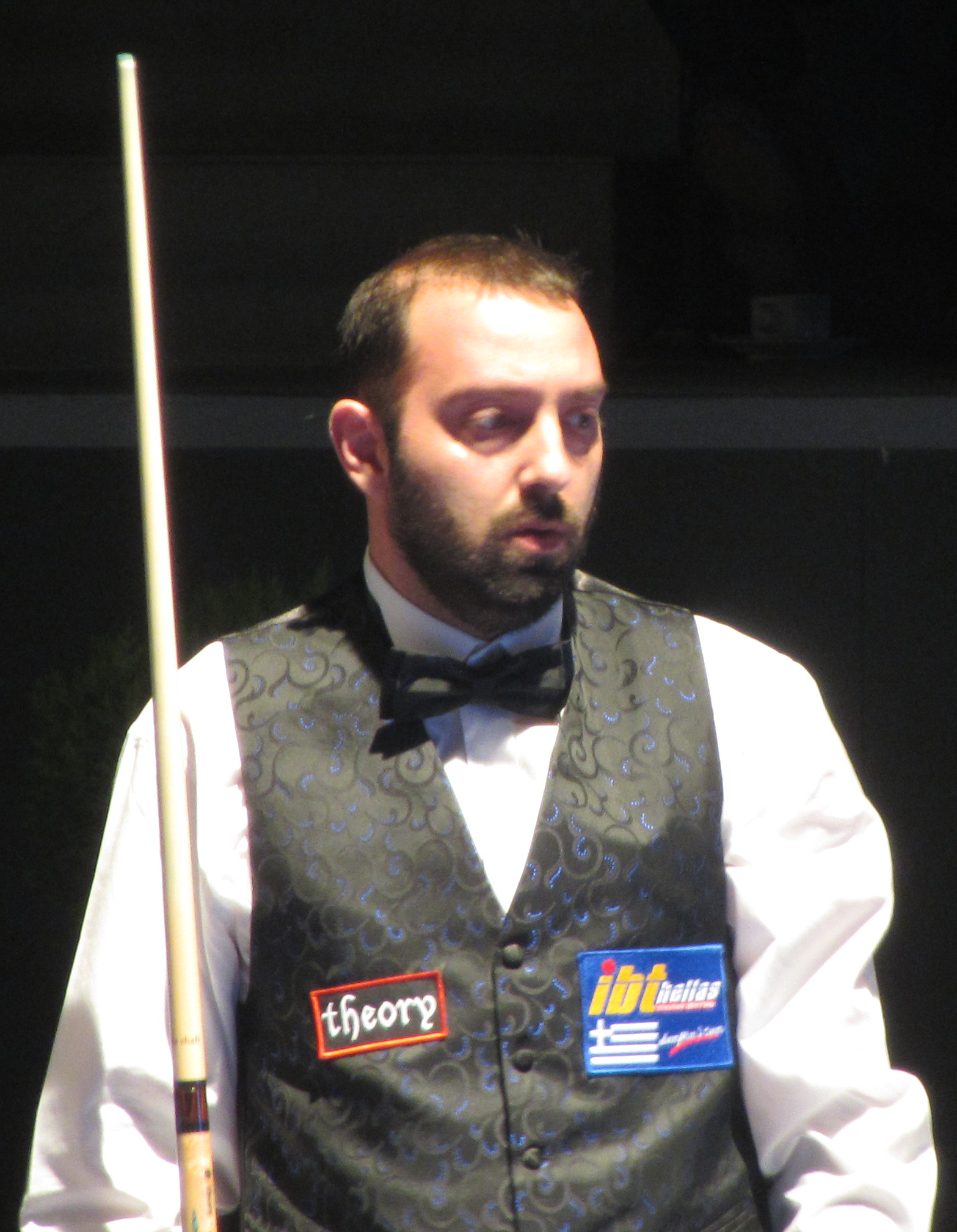

Personal information
- Nickname(s): "Poly", "Fast and Furious“
- Born: 24 March 1978 (age 47) Athens, Greece

Pool career
- Country: Greece

Tournament wins
- Major: 1999 Junior World Championship
- Highest rank: 7 (February 2013)

Nikos Polychronopoulos (born 24 March 1978) is a Greek professional Carom billiards player from Athens. In 1999, he won Junior UMB World Three-cushion Championship.

== Titles ==
Below is a list of major tournament finals contested by Polychronopoulos.

- UMB World Junior Three-Cushion Championship
  - Winner: (1999)
  - Runner-up (1998)
- UMB World Three-cushion Championship for National Teams
  - Runner-up (2003)
- UMB World Three-cushion Championship
  - Runner-up (2006)
- Three-Cushion World Cup
  - Runner-up (2008 - event 1, 2009 - event 3)
- UMB European Junior Three-cushion Championship
  - Winner (1999)
  - Runner-up (1998)
- Coupe d’Europe
  - Runner-up (2002)
