= Sluiskil =

- Village
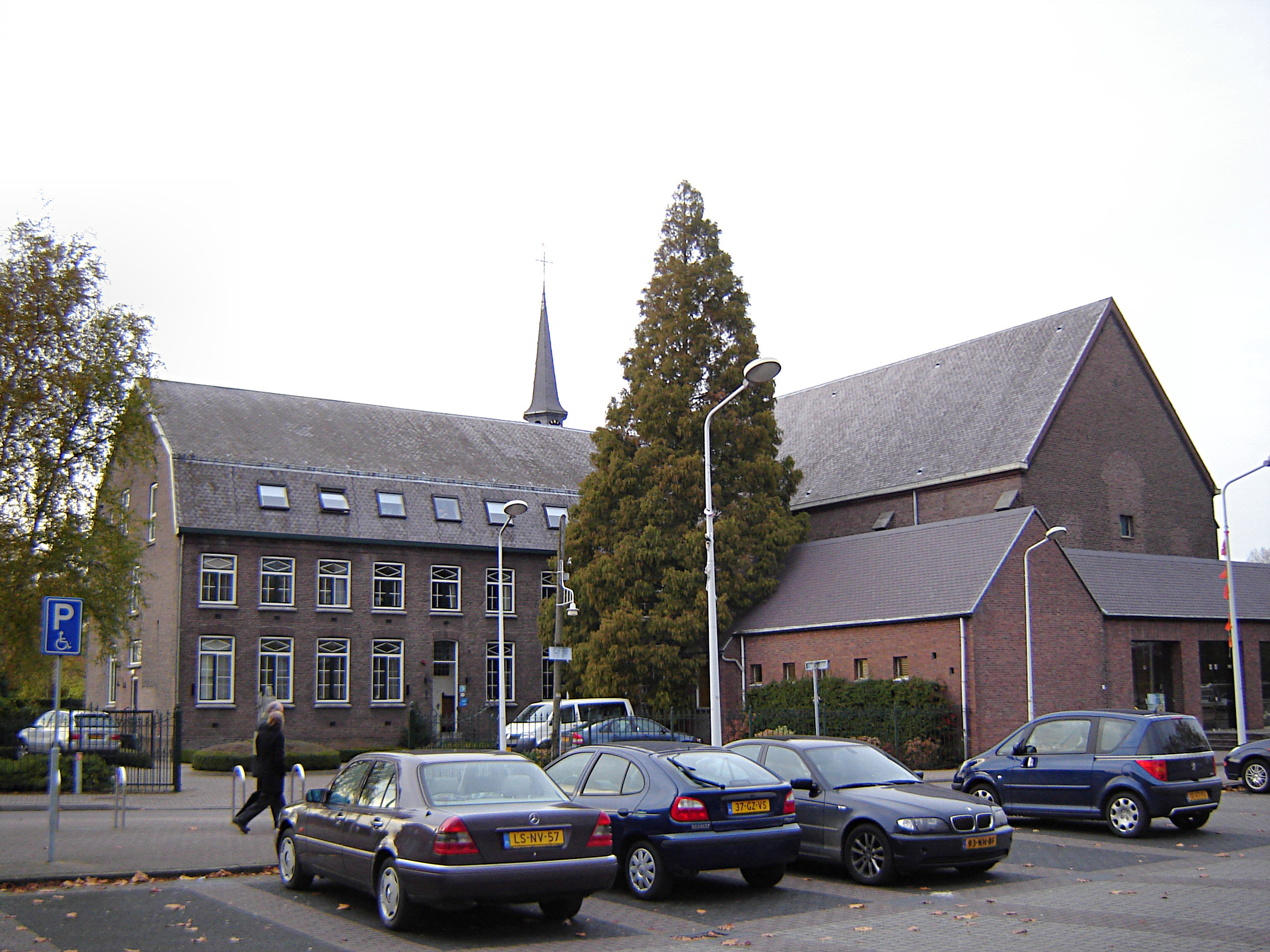
- Anthony of Padua church in Sluiskil

- Location in the province of Zeeland in the Netherlands Sluiskil (Netherlands)
- Coordinates: 51°16′41″N 3°50′18″E
- Country: Netherlands
- Province: Zeeland
- Municipality: Terneuzen

Area
  - Total: 13.37 km^{2} (5.16 sq mi)
- Elevation: 2.0 m (6.6 ft)

Population (2021)
  - Total: 2,255
  - Density: 168.7/km^{2} (436.8/sq mi)
- Time zone: UTC+1 (CET)
  - Summer (DST): UTC+2 (CEST)
- Postal code: 4541
- Dialing code: 0115

Sluiskil is a village in the Dutch province of Zeeland. It is a part of the municipality of Terneuzen, and lies about 27 km southeast of Vlissingen.

The village was first mentioned in 1839 as Sluiskil, and means "exit canal of the sluice". The village is located on the Ghent–Terneuzen Canal where there used to be a trench to the Axelse Gat. Sluiskil is a canal village which developed along the Ghent-Terneuzen canal. Factories were constructed on the east side in the early 20th century. Between 1960 and 1968, the canal was widened and a part of the west side was demolished. Sluiskil was home to 109 people in 1840.

The Catholic St Antonius of Padua Church was built between 1900 and 1901 to replace the monastery church of 1897 which burnt down in 1900. It is a single-aisled church with a ridge turret. It was modernised in 1962. In 2015, the Sluiskiltunnel opened as a replacement of the bridge over the canal. The bridge averaged 23 opening a day and used to cause large traffic jams.
