= Kim Kyung-roul =

South Korean billiards player (1980–2015)

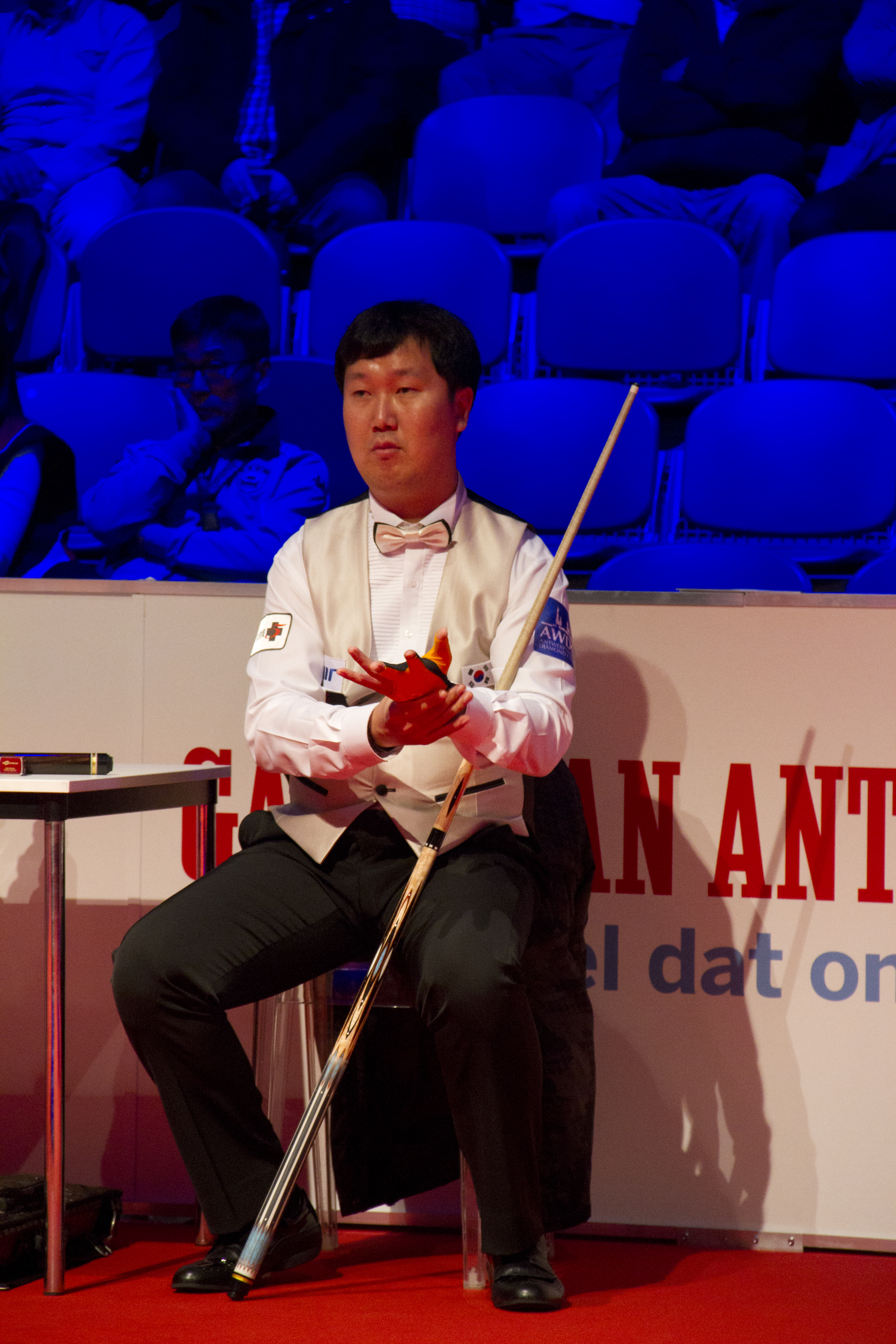
- Kim Kyung-roul at the 2013 Three-Cushion World Cup

Medal record

Representing South Korea

Men's Cue sports

Asian Indoor Games
Bronze medal – third place	2009 Ho Chi Minh	One-cushion

Asian Games
Bronze medal – third place	2006 Doha	Three-cushion

Kim Kyung-roul (Korean: 김경률; 23 February 1980 – 22 February 2015) was a South Korean professional billiards player. He won the 2010 Three-Cushion World Cup.

Kim lived in Ilsan, where he died on 22 February 2015, after falling out of his apartment window. He was 34.
