= Roland Forthomme =

Belgian carom billiards player (born 1970)

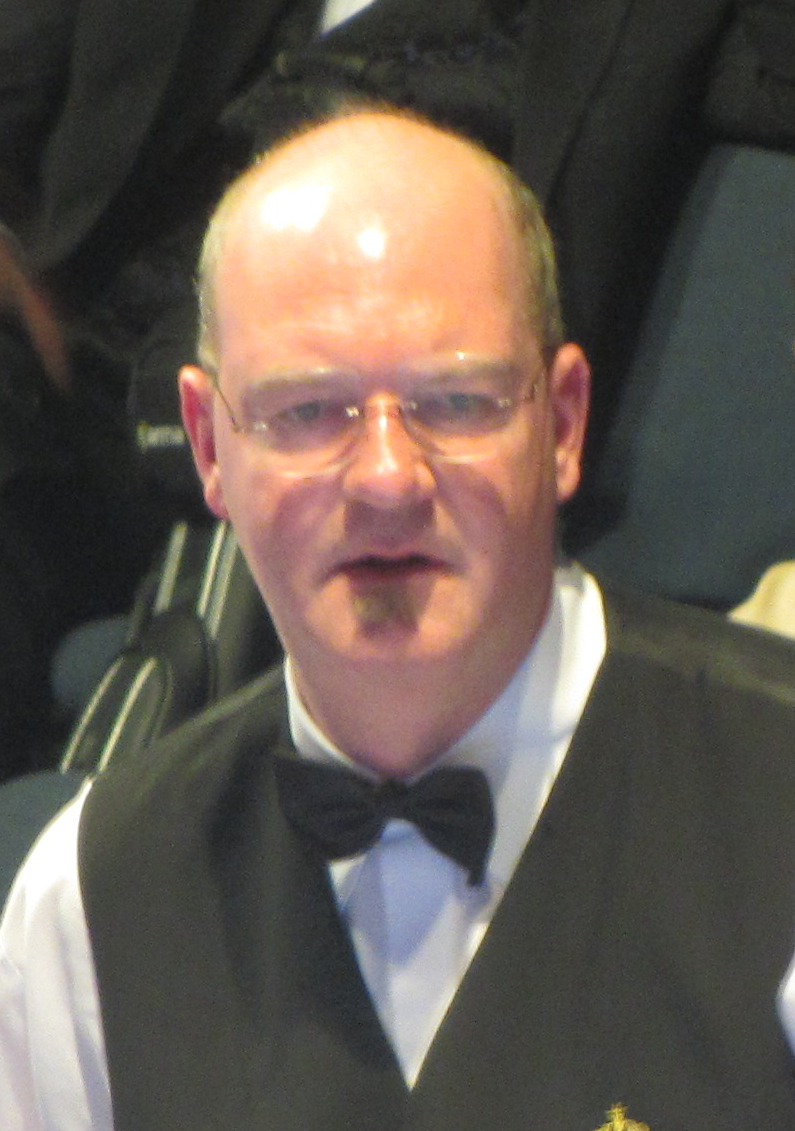
- Forthomme in 2013 3 November 1970 (age 56)

Medal record

Men's three-cushion billiards

Representing Belgium

World Cup
Gold medal – first place	2005/2 Hurghada	Individual
Gold medal – first place	2006/3 Volos	Individual
Bronze medal – third place	2007/1 Sluiskil	Individual
Silver medal – second place	2007/4 Porto	Individual
Bronze medal – third place	2007/6 Mexico City	Individual
Silver medal – second place	2014/3 Porto	Individual
Silver medal – second place	2015/5 Istanbul	Individual
Silver medal – second place	2017/7 el-Gouna	Individual
Silver medal – second place	2019/2 Ho Chi Minh City	Individual

Roland Forthomme (born 3 November 1970) is a Belgian carom billiards player. He won the Three-Cushion World Cup in 2005 and 2006, and finished second five times and third twice from 2007 to 2019. In 2012, he equaled the world record run in three-cushion billiards. In 2021 Forthomme suffered a heart attack, but returned to competition after undergoing surgery.
