= Raimond Burgman =

Dutch carom billiards player (born 1964)

- 12 February 1964 (age 62); Heemstede, Netherlands

Medal record

Men's three-cushion billiards

Representing Netherlands

World Cup
Bronze medal – third place	1994/5 Halle (Saale)	Individual
Bronze medal – third place	1995/9 Istanbul	Individual
Gold medal – first place	1996/6 Daegu	Individual
Bronze medal – third place	1998/5 Corfu	Individual
Bronze medal – third place	1998/6 Bogotá	Individual
Bronze medal – third place	1999/2 Las Vegas	Individual
Bronze medal – third place	2005/3 Barendrecht	Individual

World Championship
Silver medal – second place	1997 Grubbenvorst	Three-cushion

European Championship
Bronze medal – third place	2000 Madrid	Individual
Silver medal – second place	2012 Istanbul	Individual

Raimond Burgman (born 12 February 1964) is a Dutch carom billiards player. He won at the Three-Cushion World Cup in 1996. Burgman got into third place six times at the Three-Cushion World Cup from 1994 to 2005. He placed into second place at the UMB World Three-cushion Championship and CEB European Three-cushion Championship, in which Burgman also placed in third place at the CEB European Three-cushion Championship in 2000. He won a Christmas tournament in Zundert in 2012. Burgman was also in a match against Dave Christiani.
