= Ludo Dielis =

Billiards player

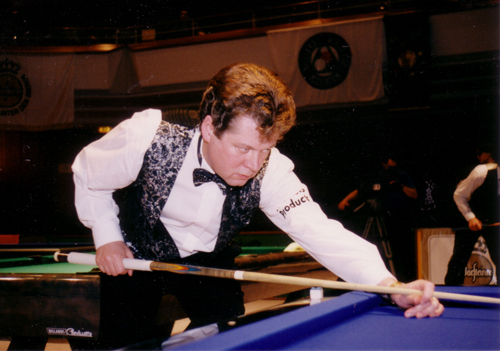

Medal record

Men's Three-cushion billiards

Representing Belgium

UMB World Three-cushion Championship
Gold medal – first place	1981 Cairo	Individuals
Gold medal – first place	1989 Yokohama	Individuals

CEB European Three-cushion Championship
Silver medal – second place	1973 Crosne	Individuals
Silver medal – second place	1974 Eeklo	Individuals
Silver medal – second place	1976 Valencia	Individuals
Silver medal – second place	1977 Lausanne	Individuals
Bronze medal – third place	1978 Copenhagen	Individuals
Bronze medal – third place	1982 Porto	Individuals
Bronze medal – third place	1987 Waalwijk	Individuals

Ludo Dielis (born 23 February 1945) is a Belgian professional carom billiards player.

When Raymond Ceulemans, the reigning champion, opted not to participate in the world championship in 1981 over some circumstances, Dielis was selected as a temporary replacement. Rising to the occasion, he won the title besting Nobuaki Kobayashi. He won the title again in 1989 against Torbjörn Blomdahl.
