= Eddy Leppens =

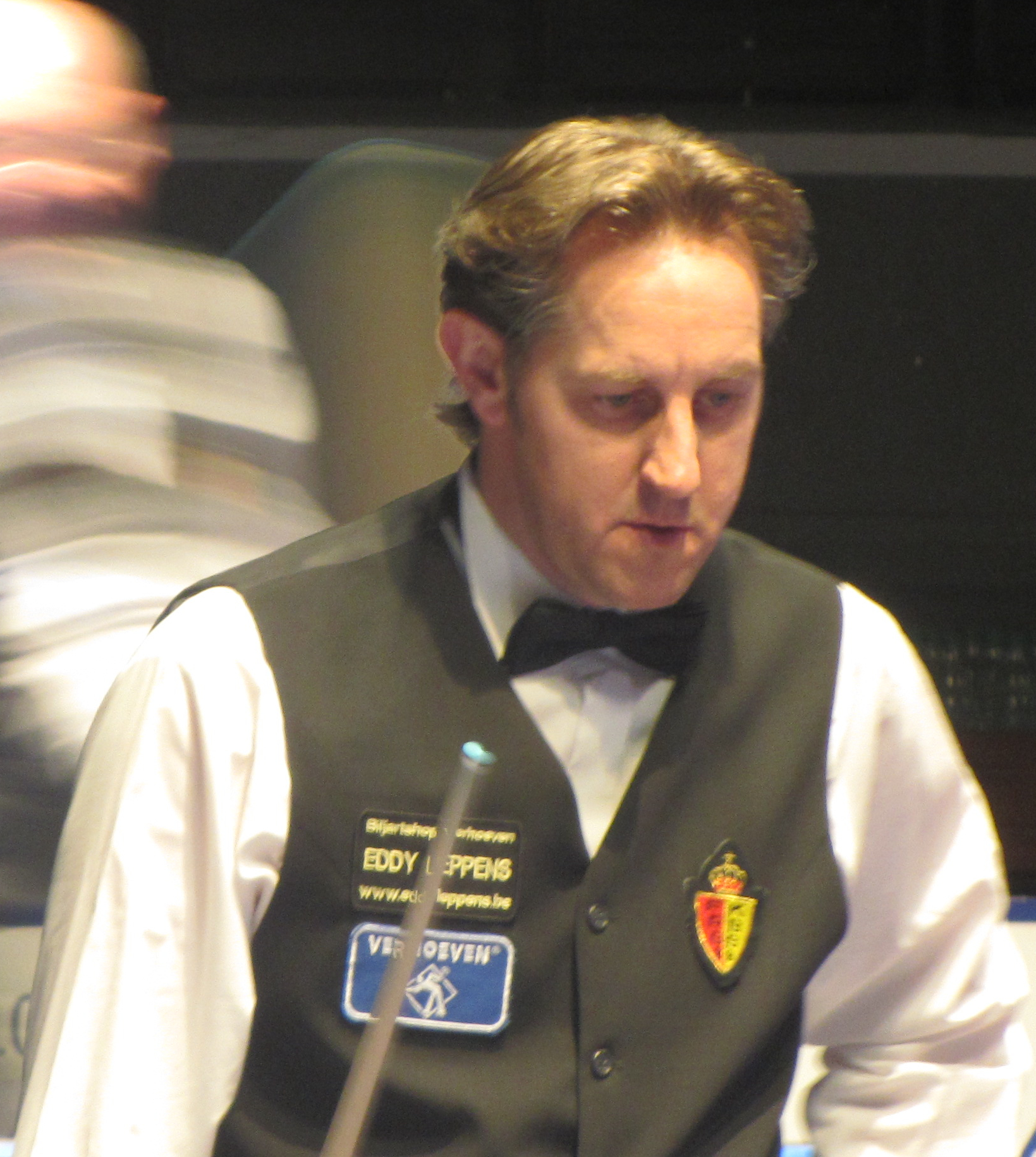

Eddy Leppens (born 3 December 1969 in Lommel, Belgium) is a Belgian professional three cushion billiards player.

== Private life ==
Leppens was born in the flanders city of Lommel where he also spend his childhood. He is married to Andrea Ospino and together they have three children named Lindsey, Maria Fernanda and Romy. In 2005 he opened his own billiard shop Verhoeven Eddy Leppens.

== Career ==
=== Early years ===
His father was an active billiards player. At eighteen, Eddy Leppens was playing of the Honour Division in straight rail, four years later in all six disciplines of carom billiards: straight rail, balkline (47/2, 47/1 and 71/2), one-cushion, and three-cushion billiards. In 1993, Leppens won the Belgian Cup in three cushion, his preferred discipline.

=== 2000–2010 ===
In 2002, in three cushion billiards, he had his best single average of 5.000 with 50 points in 10 innings. A year later, he established his high run of 25. The following year, he set a new world record with a team average of 2.139 together with his teammates Frédéric Caudron, Raymond Burgman and Johan Loncelle.

In 2010 his team won the club world championship in three cushion.

=== 2012/13 season ===
At the UMB World Three-cushion Championship in early September in Porto Leppens was able to win his first group match against German Markus Dömer 40-14, but lost his second match against Lütfi Çenet from Turkey 34-40. He finished second in his group but did not advance as only the first-place finisher moved on.

One month later, at the ANAG Billiard Cup, a Triathlon Invitation Tournament in Czech Olomouc, Leppens would beat Raul Cuenca from Spain in the final, 2-1. The tournament was held in the disciplines balkline, one-cushion and three-cushion. While he was losing balkline 24-100 to Cuenca, he won his games in one-cushion 50-27 and three-cushion 15-8. During the group games he beat the 2012 Triathlon-World Champion, Wolfgang Zenker from Germany, who had finished third in the 2011 tournament.

Together with Frédéric Caudron, Leppens plays for the Belgian club BC De Goeie Queue in the major league.

== Achievements ==
- Belgian Champion Juniors: 1988 (Three-Cushion), 1990 (Free Game), 1991 (Free Game)
- Belgian Champion: 1991 (Free Game and Balkline 71/2), 1993 (Balkline 47/1 and One-Cushion), 1994 (One-Cushion), 1995 (Free Game and One-Cushion), 2000 (Free Game)
- Semi Team World Champion: 1992 (Triathlon)
- Team World Champion: 1993 (Triathlon)
- Superprestige: 2004 (Three-Cushion)
- Three Cushion World Championship: 2. Place: 2010; 3. Place: 2005, 2009
- One Cushion World Championship: 3. Place: 2007
- Tree Cushion World Cup: 3. Place: 2011
- One Cushion European Championship: 3. Place: 2000, 2006
- ANAG Billiard Cup: 2012 (Triathlon)
