= Nobuaki Kobayashi =

Japanese billiards player (1942–2019)

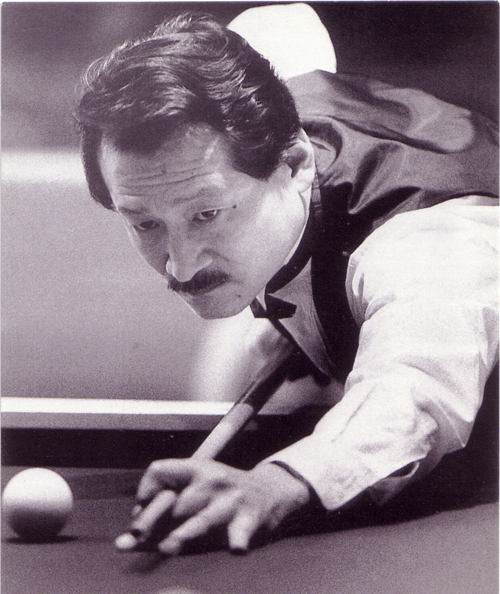

Nobuaki Kobayashi (小林 伸明, Kobayashi Nobuaki; March 26, 1942 – 25 November 2019) was a Japanese professional three-cushion billiards player and 2-time world champion.

After placing 2nd to Belgium's Raymond Ceulemans three times (1970, 1972 and 1973) in the UMB World Three-cushion Championship, Kobayashi turned things around and defeated Ceulemans for the world title in 1974. With this win, he ended Ceulemans' 10-year reign as champion. Kobayashi later admitted that he had been taping on camera Ceulemans' performances in a 1969 tournament in Tokyo in order to study the Belgian's playing style.

A decade later, he won it again at the expense of Ludo Dielis. He defended it unsuccessfully the following year, losing to Ceulemans again.

For more than three decades, he was the only Asian native (not counting Sang Lee who represented the United States at the time) ever to win a World Three-cushion Championship. Two other players from Japan were close to achieving a world title but both were not very fortunate. This was until Ryuuji Umeda, another Japanese, won the title in 2007.

Kobayashi was a 9-time Japanese Champion. His son, Hideaki Kobayashi, was also a professional three-cushion billiards player.

His highest run documented is 15.

In 2012, Kobayashi was inducted into the Billiard Congress of Japan Hall of Fame.

He died on 25 November 2019 at the age of 77.
