= Billiards and Snooker Federation of India =

- Sport: Cue sports
- Jurisdiction: India
- Membership: 25 member associations
- Abbreviation: BFSI
- Founded: 1926; 100 years ago
- Affiliation: World Confederation of Billiards Sports; International Billiards and Snooker Federation
- Regional affiliation: Asian Confederation of Billiards Sports; Asian Pocket Billiard Union; Asian Carom Billiard Confederation
- Headquarters: 5/1, Jasma Bhavan Road, Bangalore, Karnataka
- President: M.C. Uthappa
- Vice president(s): Sunil Bajaj, Soumini Srinivas, Vijay Goel, Pradip Saragoi
- Secretary: Devendra Joshi

Official website
- bsfi.net
- (India)

The Billiards and Snooker Federation of India (BSFI) is the governing body for cue sports in India.

== History ==
The Billiards and Snooker Federation of India was founded in 1926. The BFSI is affiliated to the World Confederation of Billiards Sports (WCBS), the International Billiards and Snooker Federation, the Asian Confederation of Billiards Sports, the Asian Pocket Billiard Union, and the Asian Carom Billiard Confederation. It is also recognized by the Indian Olympic Association.

In July 2010, the BFSI relaxed the traditional bow tie dress code for cue sports players and permitted players attending selection camps to wear casual attire such as T-shirts and jeans while playing. The decision was part of the federation's strategy to give the image of cue sports in India a makeover.

R.K. Vissanji was the first Indian to be elected as the President of the International Billiards and Snooker Federation (IBSF). Capt. P. V. K. Mohan, who served as the head of BFSI, became the second Indian (and third Asian) to be elected as the IBSF President in November 2014.

On 25 July 2017, BFSI announced the launch of Cue Slam — Indian Cue Masters League, a franchise cue sports league. The inaugural season of the event was held in Ahmedabad from 19 to 25 August 2017.
