= World Three-cushion Billiards Championship =

World Three-cushion Billiards Championship may refer to:

- Informal challenge match championships of the 19th century to early 20th century (see List of World Three-cushion Billiards Champions)
- The UMB World Three-cushion Championship
- Informally, the Billiards World Cup
