= UMB World Three-cushion Championship =

Competition in 3-cushion billiards

Tournament information
- Organisation(s): UMB
- Format: Round Robin / single-elimination
- Recent edition: 2026
- Current champion: (Belgium) Eddy Merckx

Henk Robijns from the Netherlands shows some of his caramboles from the 1933 championship in Cairo, and two trick shots.

The UMB World Three-cushion Championship is a professional carom billiards tournament in the discipline of three-cushion billiards, organized mostly annually by the Union Mondiale de Billard (UMB). Until 1953 it was organized by the UIFAB (Union Internationale des Federations d'Amateurs de Billard). During a dispute between the UMB and Billiards World Cup Association (BWA), the UMB decided not to organize the championship between 1988 and 1993. Instead the overall winner of the World Cup was announced as also the world champion.

At the UMB General Assembly held in Valencia on October 15, 2022, it was decided to classify the 1992 and 1993 World Championships as unofficial. Consequently, Torbjörn Blomdahl (1992) and Sang Chun Lee (1993) are considered unofficial world champions.

From 1928 to 1958 and from 1985 to 1987, matches were played as a single frame with a run to 50 points (or 60 points between 1960 and 1984). From 1994 to 2011 the tournament was played in a set-system, the winner achieving the best of five. Since 2012 it has been changed back to a single frame with the run to 40 points.

== Prize money and ranking points ==
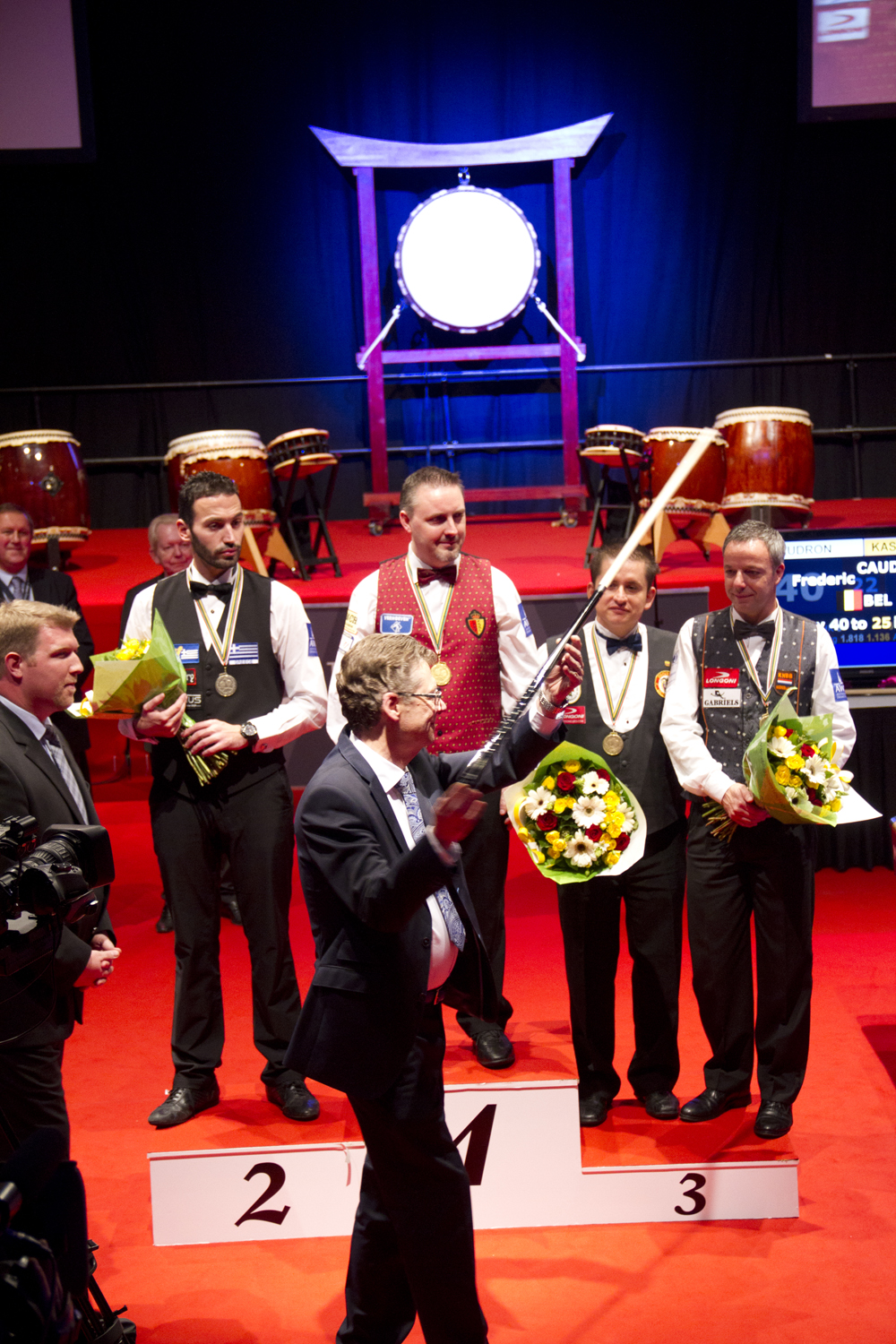
2013 Award ceremony. Ludo Dielis hands over the diamant-cue to the winner Frederic Caudron. From Left to right: Vice world champion Filippos Kasidokostas, Caudron, Bronze medal winners Alexander Salazar and Dick Jaspers.

| Rank | Prize | Ranking points |
|---|---|---|
| Winner | 40.000 € x 1 | 120 |
| Runner-up | 20.000 € x 1 | 81 |
| 3. & 4. Rank | 12.000 € x 2 | 57 |
| 5. – 8. Rank | 6.000 € x 4 | 39 |
| 9. – 16. Rank | 3.000 € x 8 | 24 |
| 17. – 32. Rank | 2.000 € x 16 | 12 |
| 33. – 48. Rank | 1.000 € x 16 | 8 |
| Total | 188.000 € | |

== Tournament records timeline ==
General Average (GA)
| GA | Name | Year |
|---|---|---|
| 0,552 | (Egypt) Edmond Soussa | 1928 |
| 0,720 | (Belgium) Emile Zaman | 1929 |
| 0,755 | (Spain) Claudio Puigvert | 1935 |
| 0,859 | (United States) Edward Lee | 1936 |
| 0,884 | (Argentina) Augusto Vergez | 1938 |
| 0,922 | (Argentina) José Bonomo | 1948 |
| 1,070 | (Argentina) Pedro Leopoldo Carrera | 1952 |
| 1,089 | (Belgium) René Vingerhoedt | 1958 |
| 1,307 | (Belgium) Raymond Ceulemans | 1963 |
| 1,345 | (Belgium) Raymond Ceulemans | 1966 |
| 1,478 | (Belgium) Raymond Ceulemans | 1973 |
| 1,500 | (Belgium) Raymond Ceulemans | 1976 |
| 1,679 | (Belgium) Raymond Ceulemans | 1978 |
| 1,745 | (Belgium) Raymond Ceulemans | 1986 |
| 2,015 | (Sweden) Torbjörn Blomdahl | 1997 |
| 2,122 | (Sweden) Torbjörn Blomdahl | 2010 |
| 2,123 | (Vietnam) Ma Minh Cam | 2017 |
| 2,352 | (Netherlands) Dick Jaspers | 2018 |
| 2,463 | (Turkey) Tayfun Taşdemir | 2021 |

Special Average (SA)
| SA | Name | Year |
|---|---|---|
| 0,746 | (Belgium) Emile Zaman | 1928 |
| 0,961 | (Belgium) Emile Zaman | 1929 |
| 1,136 | (Spain) Claudio Puigvert | 1932 |
| 1,162 | (Argentina) Augusto Vergez | 1938 |
| 1,562 | (Uruguay) Alfredo Fuentes | 1948 |
| 1,612 | (Belgium) René Vingerhoedt | 1952 |
| 1,612 | (Germany) August Tiedtke | 1958 |
| 2,068 | (Belgium) Raymond Ceulemans | 1963 |
| 2,500 | (Belgium) Raymond Ceulemans | 1966 |
| 2,631 | (Belgium) Raymond Ceulemans | 1986 |
| 2,812 | (Japan) Nobuaki Kobayashi | 1988 |
| 2,812 | (Sweden) Torbjörn Blomdahl | 1991 |
| 2,812 | (Sweden) Torbjörn Blomdahl | 1997 |
| 2,812 | (Sweden) Torbjörn Blomdahl | 2001 |
| 3,461 | (Spain) Daniel Sánchez | 2005 |
| 4,500 | (Netherlands) Dick Jaspers | 2011 |
| 5,714 | (South Korea) Kang Dong-koong | 2013 |

High Run (HR)
| HR | Name | Year |
|---|---|---|
| 9 | (Egypt) Edmond Soussa | 1928 |
| 10 | (Spain) Enrique Miró | 1931 |
| 10 | (Spain) Claudio Puigvert | 1932 |
| 12 | (Egypt) Edmond Soussa | 1933 |
| 12 | (France) Alfred Lagache | 1938 |
| 12 | (Uruguay) Alfredo Fuentes | 1948 |
| 12 | (France) Bernard Siguret | 1952 |
| 12 | (Germany) August Tiedtke | 1953 |
| 13 | (Austria) Johann Scherz | 1958 |
| 14 | (Belgium) Raymond Steylaerts | 1964 |
| 14 | (Belgium) Raymond Ceulemans | 1974 |
| 15 | (Belgium) Raymond Ceulemans | 1975 |
| 15 | (Belgium) Raymond Ceulemans | 1980 |
| 15 | (Netherlands) Rini van Bracht | 1982 |
| 15 | (Spain) Avelino Rico | 1986 |
| 15 | (Sweden) Torbjörn Blomdahl | 1991 |
| 15 | (Belgium) Jozef Philipoom | 1995 |
| 15 | (Italy) Marco Zanetti | 1997 |
| 15 | (Spain) Daniel Sánchez | 1998 |
| 15 | (Netherlands) Raimond Burgman | 1998 |
| 15 | (United States) Sang Lee | 1999 |
| 15 | (Italy) Marco Zanetti | 2000 |
| 15 | (Belgium) Eddy Merckx | 2010 |
| 17 | (Belgium) Frédéric Caudron | 2012 |
| 17 | (Belgium) Frédéric Caudron | 2013 |
| 18 | (United States) Pedro Piedrabuena | 2014 |
| 19 | (Egypt) Sameh Sidhom | 2015 |
| 19 | (Denmark) Tonny Carlsen | 2018 |
| 20 | (Germany) Martin Horn | 2021 |

== List of champions ==
This is the list of UMB three-cushion billiards world champions, from 1928 to present.

| No. | Year | Venue | Winner | Avg. | 2nd | Avg. | 3rd | Avg. |
|---|---|---|---|---|---|---|---|---|
| 1 | 1928 | (France) Reims | (Egypt) Edmond Soussa | 0,552 | (Netherlands) Carel Koopman | 0,493 | (Germany) Otto Unshelm | 0,489 |
| 2 | 1929 | (Belgium) Brussels | (Egypt) Edmond Soussa | 0,604 | (Belgium) Emile Zaman | 0,720 | (Netherlands) Arnoud Sengers | 0,542 |
| 3 | 1930 | (Netherlands) Amsterdam | (Netherlands) Hendrik J. Robijns | 0,587 | (Egypt) Edmond Soussa | 0,541 | (Netherlands) Arnoud Sengers | 0,542 |
| 4 | 1931 | (Spain) Barcelona | (Spain) Enrique Miró | 0,551 | (Egypt) Edmond Soussa | 0,632 | (Netherlands) Arnoud Sengers | 0,571 |
| 5 | 1932 | (France) Vichy | (Netherlands) Hendrik J. Robijns | 0,679 | (Spain) Claudio Puigvert | 0,698 | (Switzerland) Franz Aeberhard | 0,557 |
| 6 | 1933 | (Egypt) Cairo | (Netherlands) Hendrik J. Robijns | 0,628 | (Egypt) Edmond Soussa | 0,593 | (Spain) Claudio Puigvert | 0,547 |
| 7 | 1934 | (Spain) Barcelona | (Spain) Claudio Puigvert | 0,695 | (France) Jacques Davin | 0,590 | (France) Jean Albert | 0,508 |
| 8 | 1935 | (France) Algiers | (France) Alfred Lagache | 0,656 | (Spain) Claudio Puigvert | 0,755 | (Belgium) Emile Zaman | 0,643 |
| 9 | 1936 | (United States) New York | (United States) Edward Lee | 0,859 | (United States) Eugene Deardorff | 0,665 | (Egypt) Edmond Soussa | 0,631 |
| 10 | 1937 | (Germany) Köln | (France) Alfred Lagache | 0,696 | (Germany) August Tiedtke | 0,680 | (Netherlands) Arnoud Sengers | 0,603 |
| 11 | 1938 | (Argentina) Buenos Aires | (Argentina) Augusto Vergez | 0,884 | (Argentina) Jean Francisco Vergez | 0,677 | (France) Alfred Lagache | 0,745 |
| | 1939 to 1947: not held | | | | | | | |
| 12 | 1948 | (Argentina) Buenos Aires | (Belgium) Rene Vingerhoedt | 0,877 | (Argentina) José Bonomo | 0,922 | (Argentina) Augusto Vergez | 0,819 |
| | 1949 to 1951: not held | | | | | | | |
| 13 | 1952 | (Argentina) Buenos Aires | (Argentina) Pedro Leopoldo Carrera | 1,070 | (Germany) August Tiedtke | 0,961 | (Argentina) Carlos Friedenthal | 0,943 |
| 14 | 1953 | (Belgium) Antwerp | (Argentina) Enrique Navarra | 0,937 | (Belgium) Rene Vingerhoedt | 1,001 | (Argentina) Pedro Leopoldo Carrera | 0,921 |
| | 1954 to 1957: not held | | | | | | | |
| 15 | 1958 | (Spain) Barcelona | (Argentina) Enrique Navarra | 0,913 | (Belgium) Rene Vingerhoedt | 1,089 | (Germany) August Tiedtke | 0,921 |
| | 1959: not held | | | | | | | |
| 16 | 1960 | (Argentina) Buenos Aires | (Belgium) Rene Vingerhoedt | 0,961 | (Uruguay) Carlos Monestier | 0,811 | (Argentina) José Bonomo | 0,887 |
| 17 | 1961 | (Netherlands) Amsterdam | (Peru) Adolfo Suárez | 0,997 | (Portugal) Egidio Vieira | 0,801 | (France) Bernard Siguret | 0,905 |
| | 1962: not held | | | | | | | |
| 18 | 1963 | (Germany) Neuss | (Belgium) Raymond Ceulemans | 1,307 | (Austria) Johann Scherz | 1,077 | (Argentina) Enrique Navarra | 0,817 |
| 19 | 1964 | (Belgium) Ostend | (Belgium) Raymond Ceulemans | 1,231 | (Argentina) Marcelo López | 1,040 | (France) Roger Hanoun | 0,939 |
| 20 | 1965 | (Netherlands) Hilversum | (Belgium) Raymond Ceulemans | 1,290 | (Austria) Johann Scherz | 1,152 | (Japan) Koya Ogata | 1,127 |
| 21 | 1966 | (Argentina) Buenos Aires | (Belgium) Raymond Ceulemans | 1,191 | (Argentina) Enrique Navarra | 1,006 | (Colombia) Alfonso González | 0,878 |
| 22 | 1967 | (Peru) Lima | (Belgium) Raymond Ceulemans | 1,345 | (Peru) Humberto Suguimizu | 0,957 | (Japan) Keizo Kubo | 1,003 |
| 23 | 1968 | (Germany) Düren | (Belgium) Raymond Ceulemans | 1,227 | (Japan) Koya Ogata | 0,910 | (Austria) Johann Scherz | 1,009 |
| 24 | 1969 | (Japan) Tokyo | (Belgium) Raymond Ceulemans | 1,276 | (Japan) Koya Ogata | 0,992 | (Argentina) Diego Martínez | 0,906 |
| 25 | 1970 | (United States) Las Vegas | (Belgium) Raymond Ceulemans | 1,164 | (Japan) Nobuaki Kobayashi | 0,998 | (Austria) Johann Scherz | 0,876 |
| 26 | 1971 | (Netherlands) Groningen | (Belgium) Raymond Ceulemans | 1,266 | (Netherlands) Rini van Bracht | 0,865 | (Netherlands) Henny de Ruyter | 0,814 |
| 27 | 1972 | (Argentina) Buenos Aires | (Belgium) Raymond Ceulemans | 1,315 | (Japan) Nobuaki Kobayashi | 1,025 | (Denmark) Peter Thøgersen | 0,902 |
| 28 | 1973 | (Egypt) Cairo | (Belgium) Raymond Ceulemans | 1,478 | (Japan) Nobuaki Kobayashi | 0,966 | (Peru) Humberto Suguimizu | 0,811 |
| 29 | 1974 | (Belgium) Antwerp | (Japan) Nobuaki Kobayashi | 1,312 | (Belgium) Raymond Ceulemans | 1,325 | (Japan) Yoshio Yoshihara | 1,130 |
| 30 | 1975 | (Bolivia) La Paz | (Belgium) Raymond Ceulemans | 1,308 | (Netherlands) Rini van Bracht | 0,922 | (Japan) Nobuaki Kobayashi | 1,206 |
| 31 | 1976 | (Belgium) Ostend | (Belgium) Raymond Ceulemans | 1,500 | (Japan) Nobuaki Kobayashi | 1,305 | (Japan) Junichi Komori | 1,238 |
| 32 | 1977 | (Japan) Tokyo | (Belgium) Raymond Ceulemans | 1,372 | (Japan) Nobuaki Kobayashi | 1,187 | (Japan) Yoshio Yoshihara | 1,176 |
| 33 | 1978 | (United States) Las Vegas | (Belgium) Raymond Ceulemans | 1,679 | (Japan) Nobuaki Kobayashi | 1,205 | (Japan) Junichi Komori | 1,067 |
| 34 | 1979 | (Peru) Lima | (Belgium) Raymond Ceulemans | 1,384 | (Japan) Nobuaki Kobayashi | 1,135 | (Japan) Yoshio Yoshihara | 1,067 |
| 35 | 1980 | (Argentina) Buenos Aires | (Belgium) Raymond Ceulemans | 1,460 | (Japan) Yoshio Yoshihara | 1,217 | (Japan) Nobuaki Kobayashi | 1,192 |
| 36 | 1981 | (Egypt) Cairo | (Belgium) Ludo Dielis | 1,222 | (Japan) Nobuaki Kobayashi | 1,426 | (Austria) Johann Scherz | 1,271 |
| 37 | 1982 | (Ecuador) Guayaquil | (Netherlands) Rini van Bracht | 1,043 | (Japan) Yohio Yoshihara | 1,146 | (United States) Carlos Hallon | 1,086 |
| 38 | 1983 | (France) Aix-les-Bains | (Belgium) Raymond Ceulemans | 1,447 | (France) Richard Bitalis | 1,332 | (Japan) Nobuaki Kobayashi | 1,258 |
| 39 | 1984 | (Germany) Krefeld | (Japan) Nobuaki Kobayashi | 1,388 | (Belgium) Ludo Dielis | 1,278 | (Belgium) Raymond Ceulemans | 1,151 |
| 40 | 1985 | (Netherlands) Heeswijk-Dinther | (Belgium) Raymond Ceulemans | 1,541 | (Japan) Nobuaki Kobayashi | 1,364 | (Japan) Junichi Komori | 1,071 |
| 41 | 1986 | (United States) Las Vegas | (Spain) Avelino Rico | 1,010 | (Sweden) Torbjörn Blomdahl | 1,205 | (Belgium) Raymond Ceulemans | 1,745 |
| 42 | 1987 | (Egypt) Cairo | (Sweden) Torbjörn Blomdahl | 1,099 | (United States) Frank Torres | 0,933 | (Mexico) Arturo Bone | 0,778 |
| 43 | 1988 | (Japan) Tokyo | (Sweden) Torbjörn Blomdahl | 1,594 | (Japan) Nobuaki Kobayashi | 1,224 | (Belgium) Raymond Ceulemans | 1,293 |
| 44 | 1989 | (Japan) Yokohama | (Belgium) Ludo Dielis | 1,342 | (Sweden) Torbjörn Blomdahl | 1,389 | (Belgium) Raymond Ceulemans | 1,312 |
| 45 | 1990 | (Japan) Tokyo | (Belgium) Raymond Ceulemans | 1,527 | (Sweden) Torbjörn Blomdahl | 1,619 | (Belgium) Ludo Dielis | 1,300 |
| 46 | 1991 | (Japan) Tokyo | (Sweden) Torbjörn Blomdahl | 1,504 | (Belgium) Raymond Ceulemans | 1,518 | (Netherlands) Dick Jaspers | 1,498 |
| (**) | 1992 | (Spain) Palma | (Sweden) Torbjörn Blomdahl | 1,716 | (Belgium) Raymond Ceulemans | 1,412 | (United States) Sang Lee | 1,511 |
| (**) | 1993 | (Belgium) Gent | (United States) Sang Lee | 1,355 | (Sweden) Torbjörn Blomdahl | 1,601 | (Belgium) Raymond Ceulemans | 1,464 |
| 47 | 1994 | (Denmark) Aalborg | (Netherlands) Rini van Bracht | 1,149 | (Germany) Edgar Bettzieche | 1,038 | (Denmark) Brian Knudsen | 1,194 |
| 48 | 1995 | (Netherlands) Grubbenvorst | (Belgium) Jozef Philipoom | 1,494 | (Netherlands) John Tijssens | 1,210 | (Japan) Nobuaki Kobayashi | 1,345 |
| 49 | 1996 | (Germany) Hattingen | (Germany) Christian Rudolph | 1,025 | (Spain) Daniel Sánchez | 1,277 | (Austria) Gerhard Kostistansky | 0,982 |
| 50 | 1997 | (Netherlands) Grubbenvorst | (Sweden) Torbjörn Blomdahl | 2,015 | (Netherlands) Raimond Burgman | 1,453 | (Italy) Marco Zanetti | 1,684 |
| 51 | 1998 | (France) Rezé | (Spain) Daniel Sánchez | 1,594 | (Sweden) Torbjörn Blomdahl | 1,797 | (Germany) Christian Rudolph | 1,155 |
| 52 | 1999 | (Colombia) Bogotá | (Belgium) Frédéric Caudron | 1,538 | (Sweden) Torbjörn Blomdahl | 1,769 | (Netherlands) Dick Jaspers | 1,614 |
| 53 | 2000 | (France) Saint-Étienne | (Netherlands) Dick Jaspers | 1,773 | (Denmark) Tonny Carlsen | 1,502 | (Italy) Marco Zanetti | 1,590 |
| 54 | 2001 | Luxembourg | (Belgium) Raymond Ceulemans | 1,696 | (Italy) Marco Zanetti | 1,866 | (Mexico) Luis Miguel Ávila | 1,260 |
| No. | Year | Venue | Winner | Avg. | Finalist | Avg. | Semi-finalists | Avg. |
| 55 | 2002 | (Denmark) Randers | (Italy) Marco Zanetti | 1,732 | (Denmark) Dion Nelin | 1,519 | (Netherlands) Dick Jaspers | 1,687 |
| 55 | 2002 | (Denmark) Randers | (Italy) Marco Zanetti | 1,732 | (Denmark) Dion Nelin | 1,519 | (Peru) Ramón Rodríguez | 1,453 |
| 56 | 2003 | (Spain) Valladolid | (Turkey) Semih Saygıner | 1,868 | (Greece) Filippos Kasidokostas | 1,268 | (Sweden) Torbjörn Blomdahl | 1,833 |
| 56 | 2003 | (Spain) Valladolid | (Turkey) Semih Saygıner | 1,868 | (Greece) Filippos Kasidokostas | 1,268 | (Italy) Marco Zanetti | 1,211 |
| 57 | 2004 | (Netherlands) Rotterdam | (Netherlands) Dick Jaspers | 1,907 | (Greece) Filippos Kasidokostas | 1,399 | (Greece) Nikos Polychronopoulos | 1,437 |
| 57 | 2004 | (Netherlands) Rotterdam | (Netherlands) Dick Jaspers | 1,907 | (Greece) Filippos Kasidokostas | 1,399 | (Denmark) Jacob Haack-Sørensen | 1,442 |
| 58 | 2005 | (Spain) Lugo | (Spain) Daniel Sánchez | 1,838 | (Netherlands) Jean Paul de Bruijn | 1,566 | (Belgium) Eddy Leppens | 1,551 |
| 58 | 2005 | (Spain) Lugo | (Spain) Daniel Sánchez | 1,838 | (Netherlands) Jean Paul de Bruijn | 1,566 | (Belgium) Peter de Backer | 1,367 |
| 59 | 2006 | (Germany) Sankt Wendel | (Belgium) Eddy Merckx | 1,767 | (Greece) Nikos Polychronopoulos | 1,456 | (Belgium) Peter de Backer | 1,577 |
| 59 | 2006 | (Germany) Sankt Wendel | (Belgium) Eddy Merckx | 1,767 | (Greece) Nikos Polychronopoulos | 1,456 | (Netherlands) Dick Jaspers | 1,783 |
| 60 | 2007 | (Ecuador) Cuenca | (Japan) Ryuuji Umeda | 1,426 | (Spain) Daniel Sánchez | 1,805 | (Netherlands) Dick Jaspers | 1,484 |
| 60 | 2007 | (Ecuador) Cuenca | (Japan) Ryuuji Umeda | 1,426 | (Spain) Daniel Sánchez | 1,805 | (Peru) Ramón Rodríguez | 1,091 |
| 61 | 2008 | (Germany) Sankt Wendel | (Italy) Marco Zanetti | 1,871 | (Sweden) Torbjörn Blomdahl | 1,631 | (Belgium) Peter de Backer | 1,481 |
| 61 | 2008 | (Germany) Sankt Wendel | (Italy) Marco Zanetti | 1,871 | (Sweden) Torbjörn Blomdahl | 1,631 | (France) Jérémy Bury | 1,478 |
| 62 | 2009 | (Switzerland) Lausanne | (Greece) Filippos Kasidokostas | 1,869 | (Belgium) Eddy Merckx | 1,703 | (Belgium) Eddy Leppens | 1,598 |
| 62 | 2009 | (Switzerland) Lausanne | (Greece) Filippos Kasidokostas | 1,869 | (Belgium) Eddy Merckx | 1,703 | (Italy) Marco Zanetti | 1,612 |
| 63 | 2010 | (Netherlands) Sluiskil | (Spain) Daniel Sánchez | 1,715 | (Belgium) Eddy Leppens | 1,678 | (South Korea) Choi Sung-won | 1,718 |
| 63 | 2010 | (Netherlands) Sluiskil | (Spain) Daniel Sánchez | 1,715 | (Belgium) Eddy Leppens | 1,678 | (Spain) Javier Palazón | 1,375 |
| 64 | 2011 | (Peru) Lima | (Netherlands) Dick Jaspers | 1,917 | (Italy) Marco Zanetti | 1,551 | (Spain) Javier Palazón | 1,454 |
| 64 | 2011 | (Peru) Lima | (Netherlands) Dick Jaspers | 1,917 | (Italy) Marco Zanetti | 1,551 | (Spain) Daniel Sánchez | 1,808 |
| 65 | 2012 | (Portugal) Porto | (Belgium) Eddy Merckx | 1,983 | (South Korea) Choi Sung-won | 1,365 | (Belgium) Frédéric Caudron | 1,711 |
| 65 | 2012 | (Portugal) Porto | (Belgium) Eddy Merckx | 1,983 | (South Korea) Choi Sung-won | 1,365 | (Italy) Marco Zanetti | 1,515 |
| 66 | 2013 | (Belgium) Antwerp | (Belgium) Frédéric Caudron | 1,951 | (Greece) Filippos Kasidokostas | 1,923 | (Colombia) Alexander Salazar | 1,433 |
| 66 | 2013 | (Belgium) Antwerp | (Belgium) Frédéric Caudron | 1,951 | (Greece) Filippos Kasidokostas | 1,923 | (Netherlands) Dick Jaspers | 1,822 |
| 67 | 2014 | (South Korea) Seoul | (South Korea) Choi Sung-won | 2,000 | (Sweden) Torbjörn Blomdahl | 1,850 | (South Korea) Seo Hyun-min | 1,350 |
| 67 | 2014 | (South Korea) Seoul | (South Korea) Choi Sung-won | 2,000 | (Sweden) Torbjörn Blomdahl | 1,850 | (Netherlands) Jean Paul de Bruijn | 1,269 |
| 68 | 2015 | (France) Bordeaux | (Sweden) Torbjörn Blomdahl | 1,764 | (South Korea) Kang Dong-koong | 1,621 | (Belgium) Eddy Merckx | 1,940 |
| 68 | 2015 | (France) Bordeaux | (Sweden) Torbjörn Blomdahl | 1,764 | (South Korea) Kang Dong-koong | 1,621 | (Spain) Dani Sánchez | 1,817 |
| 69 | 2016 | (France) Bordeaux | (Spain) Daniel Sánchez | 1,983 | (South Korea) Kim Haeng-jik | 2,043 | (Turkey) Semih Saygıner | 1,618 |
| 69 | 2016 | (France) Bordeaux | (Spain) Daniel Sánchez | 1,983 | (South Korea) Kim Haeng-jik | 2,043 | (Belgium) Eddy Leppens | 1,792 |
| 70 | 2017 | (Bolivia) Santa Cruz | (Belgium) Frédéric Caudron | 2,089 | (Belgium) Eddy Merckx | 1,828 | (Vietnam) Mã Minh Cẩm | 2,123 |
| 70 | 2017 | (Bolivia) Santa Cruz | (Belgium) Frédéric Caudron | 2,089 | (Belgium) Eddy Merckx | 1,828 | (Italy) Marco Zanetti | 1,673 |
| 71 | 2018 | (Egypt) Cairo | (Netherlands) Dick Jaspers | 2,352 | (France) Jérémy Bury | 2,022 | (Vietnam) Nguyễn Quốc Nguyện | 1,629 |
| 71 | 2018 | (Egypt) Cairo | (Netherlands) Dick Jaspers | 2,352 | (France) Jérémy Bury | 2,022 | (Turkey) Semih Saygıner | 1,568 |
| 72 | 2019 | (Denmark) Randers | (Sweden) Torbjörn Blomdahl | 2,121 | (Vietnam) Nguyễn Đức Anh Chiến | 1,606 | (Egypt) Sameh Sidhom | 1,535 |
| 72 | 2019 | (Denmark) Randers | (Sweden) Torbjörn Blomdahl | 2,121 | (Vietnam) Nguyễn Đức Anh Chiến | 1,606 | (Turkey) Semih Saygıner | 1,934 |
| | 2020: not held (COVID-19 pandemic) | | | | | | | |
| 73 | 2021 | (Egypt) Sharm el-Sheikh | (Netherlands) Dick Jaspers | 1,864 | (Turkey) Murat Naci Çoklu | 1,826 | (Italy) Marco Zanetti | 2,051 |
| 73 | 2021 | (Egypt) Sharm el-Sheikh | (Netherlands) Dick Jaspers | 1,864 | (Turkey) Murat Naci Çoklu | 1,826 | (Germany) Martin Horn | 1,949 |
| 74 | 2022 | (South Korea) Donghae City | (Turkey) Tayfun Taşdemir | 2,244 | (Spain) Ruben Legazpi | 1,638 | (Belgium) Eddy Merckx | 1,841 |
| 74 | 2022 | (South Korea) Donghae City | (Turkey) Tayfun Taşdemir | 2,244 | (Spain) Ruben Legazpi | 1,638 | (Netherlands) Dick Jaspers | 1,859 |
| 75 | 2023 | (Turkey) Ankara | (Vietnam) Bao Phương Vinh | 1,594 | (Vietnam) Trần Quyết Chiến | 1,635 | (Turkey) Tayfun Taşdemir | 1,556 |
| 75 | 2023 | (Turkey) Ankara | (Vietnam) Bao Phương Vinh | 1,594 | (Vietnam) Trần Quyết Chiến | 1,635 | (South Korea) Cho Myung-woo | 1,561 |
| 76 | 2024 | (Vietnam) Phan Thiết | (South Korea) Cho Myung-woo | 2,171 | (Vietnam) Trần Thanh Lực | 1,855 | (Belgium) Eddy Merckx | 2,453 |
| 76 | 2024 | (Vietnam) Phan Thiết | (South Korea) Cho Myung-woo | 2,171 | (Vietnam) Trần Thanh Lực | 1,855 | (Netherlands) Dick Jaspers | 1,898 |
| 77 | 2025 | (Belgium) Antwerp | (Belgium) Frédéric Caudron | 2,019 | (Belgium) Eddy Merckx | 1,946 | (South Korea) Cho Myung-woo | 2,164 |
| 77 | 2025 | (Belgium) Antwerp | (Belgium) Frédéric Caudron | 2,019 | (Belgium) Eddy Merckx | 1,946 | (Austria) Arnim Kahofer | 1,519 |
| 78 | 2026 | (France) Blois | (Belgium) Eddy Merckx | 1,993 | (Vietnam) Bao Phương Vinh | 1,865 | (Turkey) Tayfun Taşdemir | 1,957 |
| 78 | 2026 | (France) Blois | (Belgium) Eddy Merckx | 1,993 | (Vietnam) Bao Phương Vinh | 1,865 | (Egypt) Sameh Sidhom | 1,619 |

(**) unofficially

== Medals (1928-2026) ==
| Rank | Nation | Gold | Silver | Bronze | Total |
|---|---|---|---|---|---|
| 1 | Belgium | 33 | 10 | 16 | 59 |
| 2 | Netherlands | 10 | 6 | 14 | 30 |
| 3 | Spain | 7 | 4 | 5 | 16 |
| 4 | Sweden | 6 | 8 | 1 | 15 |
| 5 | Argentina | 4 | 4 | 6 | 14 |
| 6 | Japan | 3 | 14 | 12 | 29 |
| 7 | France | 2 | 3 | 5 | 10 |
| 8 | South Korea | 2 | 3 | 4 | 9 |
| 9 | Egypt | 2 | 3 | 3 | 8 |
| 10 | Italy | 2 | 2 | 7 | 11 |
| 11 | Turkey | 2 | 1 | 5 | 8 |
| 12 | Vietnam | 1 | 4 | 2 | 7 |
| 13 | Greece | 1 | 4 | 1 | 6 |
| 14 | Germany | 1 | 3 | 4 | 8 |
| 15 | United States | 1 | 2 | 1 | 4 |
| 16 | Peru | 1 | 1 | 3 | 5 |
| 17 | Austria | 0 | 2 | 5 | 7 |
| 18 | Denmark | 0 | 2 | 3 | 5 |
| 19 | Portugal | 0 | 1 | 0 | 1 |
| 19 | Uruguay | 0 | 1 | 0 | 1 |
| 21 | Colombia | 0 | 0 | 2 | 2 |
| 21 | Mexico | 0 | 0 | 2 | 2 |
| 23 | Switzerland | 0 | 0 | 1 | 1 |
| Totals (23 entries) | | 78 | 78 | 102 | 258 |

== See also ==
- CEB European Three-cushion Championship
- UMB World Three-cushion Championship for National Teams
- Three-Cushion World Cup
- UMB Women's World Three-cushion Championship
