= ACBC =

ACBC may refer to:

- Asian Carom Billiard Confederation
- Association of Certified Biblical Counselors; see Nouthetic Counseling Organizations
- Athletic Club of BC
- Atlantic City–Brigantine Connector
- Australian Catholic Bishops' Conference
- Australian Corporate Bond Company
