= Christian Rudolph (disambiguation) =

Christian Rudolph is a retired East German athlete who specialized in the 400 metres hurdles.

Christian Rudolph may refer to:

- Christian Rudolph (billiards player), German professional billiards player

== See also ==
- Christian Rudolph Wilhelm Wiedemann, German physician
