= Edmond Soussa =

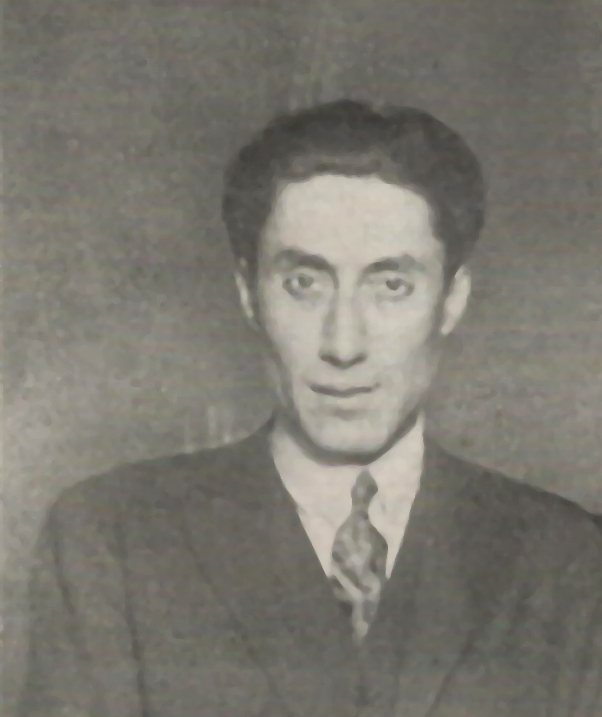
Edmond Soussa at the 1930 World Three-cushion Championship in Amsterdam

Edmond Soussa (11 October 1898 – 29 May 1989) was an Egyptian carom billiards player in various disciplines and 11-time world champion. To date, Soussa was the only African to win world titles in the sport.

== Career ==
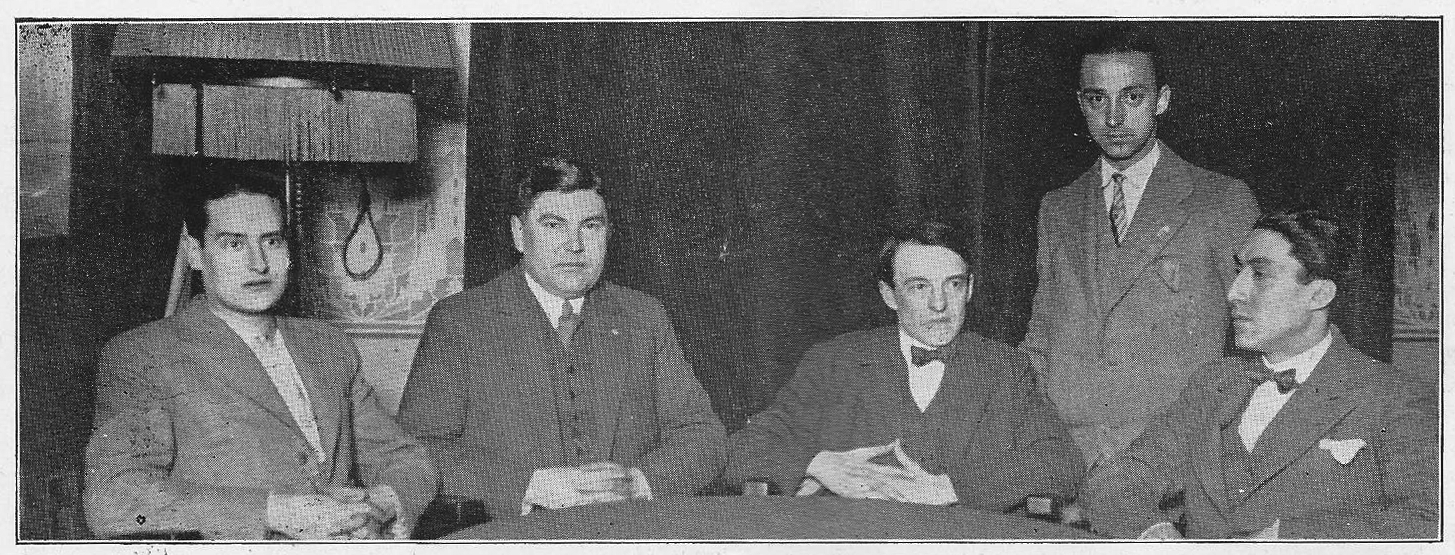
Soussa (right) at the 1930 World Three-cushion Championship in Amsterdam, together with Enrique Miro (ESP), Arnoud Sengers (NDL), Otto Unshelm (DEU), Armando Martinez Sagi (ESP) (from left).

Edmond Soussa was the first major amateur billiards star of the late 1920s and mid-30s after the end of the professional world championships in the United States of America. Born in Egypt, he immigrated in the mid-1920s to France. There he met Roger Conti, one of the best billiards coaches at that time. He quickly proved his great talent as an all-rounder. At the 1927 balkline 47.1 World Championship in Paris he finished third place. The following year he won three-time world championship titles in the disciplines three-cushion billiards, straight rail and balkline 47.1. He dominated the carom scene during the upcoming years and has won a total of eleven world and two European titles.

In the mid 1930s, he withdrew from active billiards play and worked as a freelance artist in Paris. With the beginning of the Three-Cushion World Cup in 1986, he returned to the big carom stage. Werner Bayer, founder of the World Cup convinced him to design a trophy for this tournament series. He attended various three-cushion World Cups in his old age.

== Achievements ==
Soussa was an eleven-time world and two-time European champion.

UMB World Three-cushion Championship

- Winner: 1928, 1929
- Runner-up: 1930, 1931, 1933
- Third place: 1936

UMB World Straight-Rail Championship

- Winner: 1928, 1929, 1930
- Runner-up: 1931, 1932

UMB World Balkline 47.1 Championship

- Winner: 1928, 1929, 1931
- Runner-up: 1930, 1932, 1933

UMB World Balkline 47.2 Championship

- Winner: 1933
- Runner-up: 1930
- Third place: 1927, 1928, 1929, 1932

UMB World Balkline 71.2 Championship

- Winner: 1930, 1931

CEB European Balkline 47.2 Championship

- Winner: 1932, 1933
- Third place: 1928, 1929
