= Confederación Panamericana de Billar =

Governing body of carom billiards in the Americas

- Established: 1954
- Region served: America
- Members: 21 Members
- Official language: Spanish
- President: (Nicaragua) Carlos A. Rivera
- Administrative Vice President: (Peru) Carlos Izquierdo
- Vice President Legal Affairs: (Colombia) Jorge Franco Pineda
- Vice President Sports Affairs: (Netherlands Antilles) Michael AC Arvelo
- Website: www.cpbillar.net/esp1/

The Confederación Panamericana de Billar (CPB) also known as the Pan-American Billiard Confederation, is the governing body of carom billiards in the Americas and is affiliated to the world federation Union Mondiale de Billard (UMB). It has its headquarters in Guatemala.

== Work ==
It is responsible for the organization of the international tournaments in the Americas. The CPB has currently 21 members, who are responsible for the national level, like the National Championships.

== Members ==
- FAAB – Federación Argentina de Aficionados al Billar
- FAB – Federación Aruba de Billar
- FBB – Federacion Bolivia de Billiar
- CBBS – (Brazil) Confederación Brasilera de Billar y Sinuca
- CBSA – (Canada) Canadian Billiard & Snooker Association
- FCJB – (Chile) Federación Chilena de Juegos de Billar
- FCB – (Colombia) Federación Colombiana de Billar
- FCRB – (Costa Rica) Federación Costarricense de Billar
- FEB – (Ecuador) Federación Ecuatoriana de Billar
- FGB – (Guadeloupe) Federación Guadalupe de Billar
- ANBG – Asociación Nacional de Billar de Guatemala
- FHB – (Honduras) Federación Hondureña de Billar
- FMB – (Mexico) Federación Mexicana de Billar
- FEBIKO – (Netherlands Antilles) (Curaçao) Federacion Antillas Holandesas
- FNB – (Nicaragua) Federación Nicaragüense de Billar
- FPB – (Panama) Federación Panameña de Billar
- FPB – (Peru) Federación Peruana de Billar
- CSF – (Trinidad and Tobago) Cue Sport Foundation (Trinidad & Tobago)
- FBU – Federación de Billar del Uruguay
- USBA – United States Billiard Association
- FVB – (Venezuela) Federación Venezolana de Billar

== See also ==
- African Carom Confederation (ACC)
- Asian Carom Billiard Confederation (ACBC)
- Confédération Européenne de Billard (CEB)
