= UMB World Three-cushion Championship for National Teams =

Billiards tournament

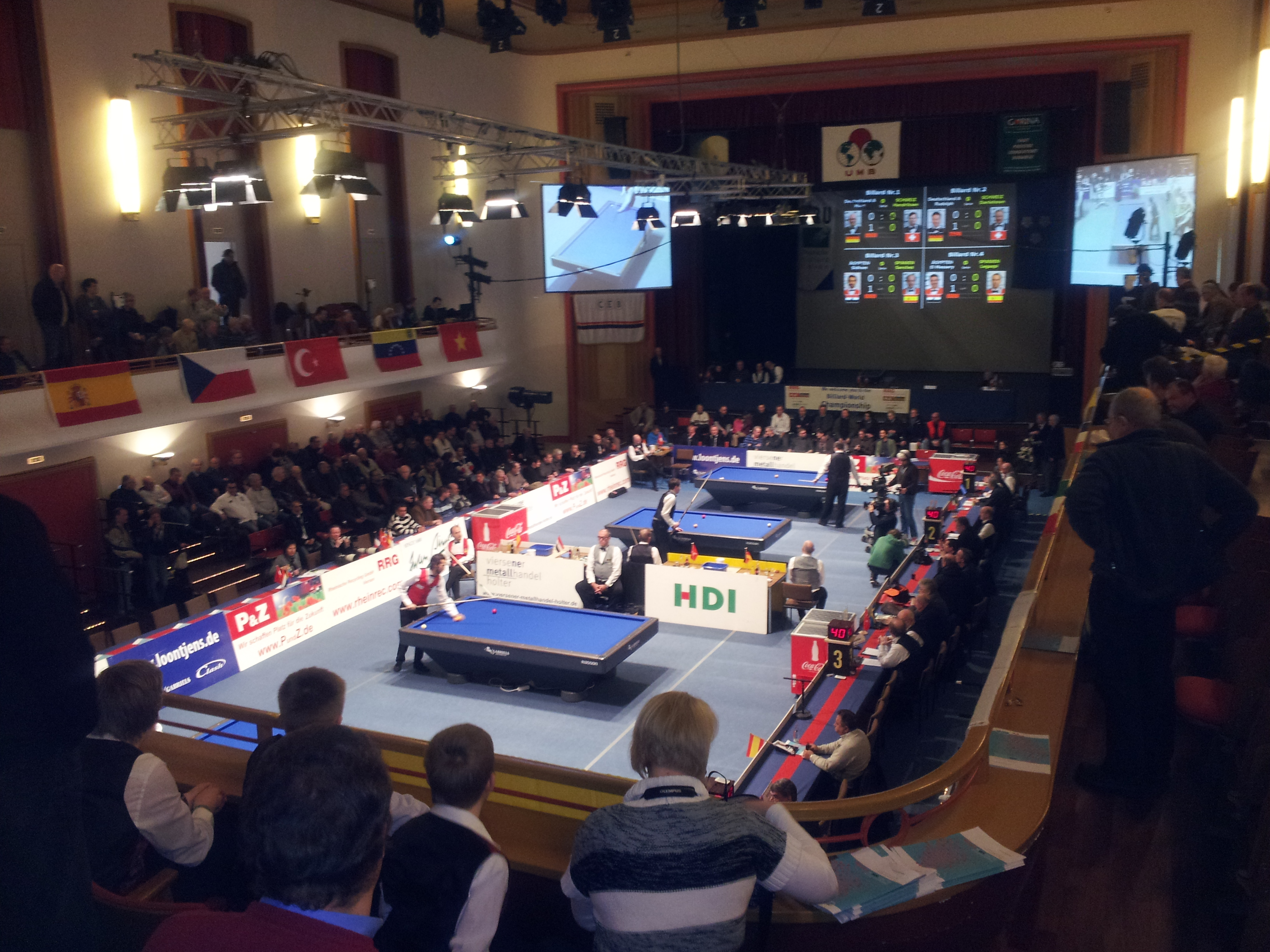
Overview 1 – Viersen 2013

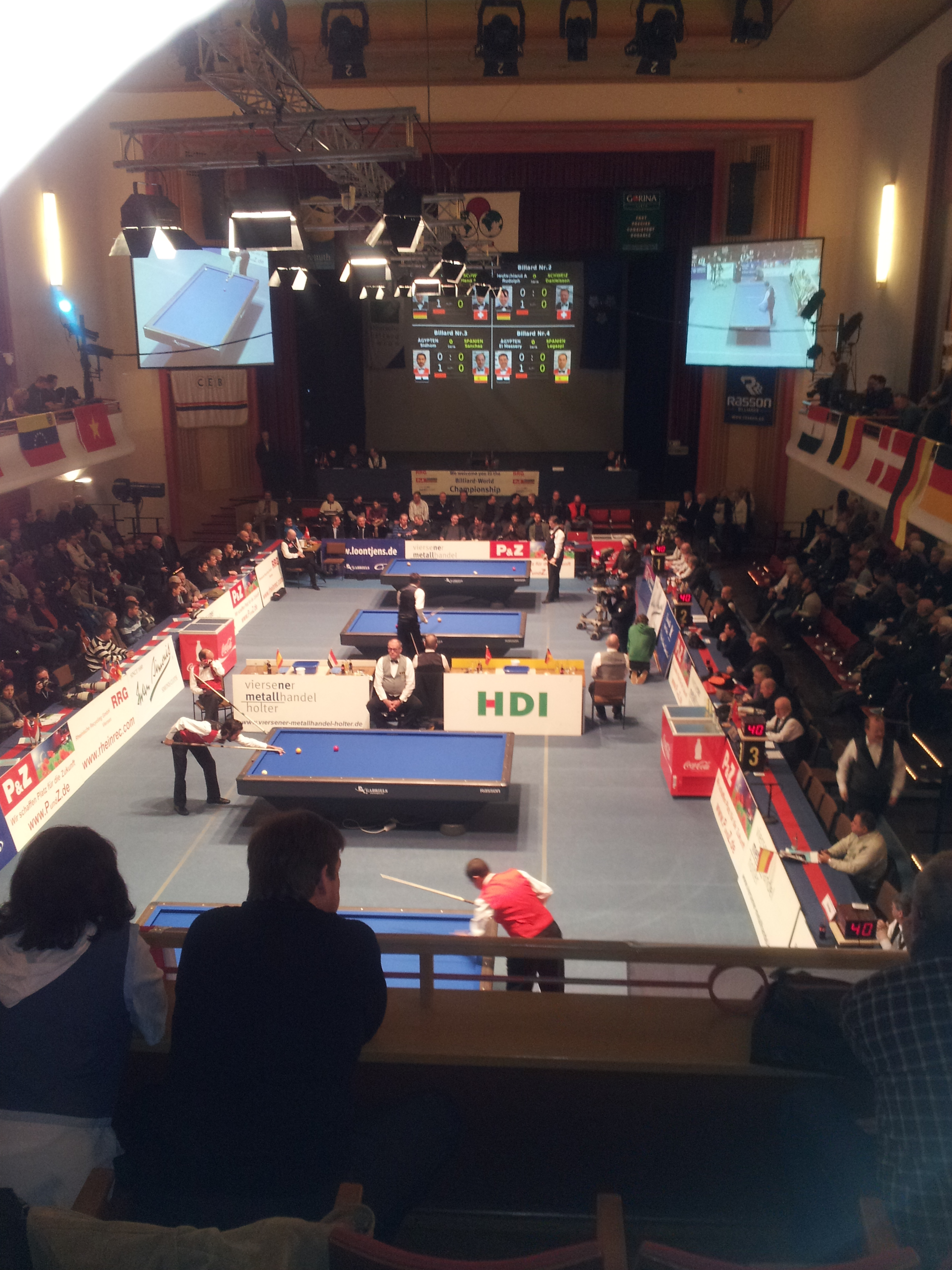
Overview 2 – Viersen 2013

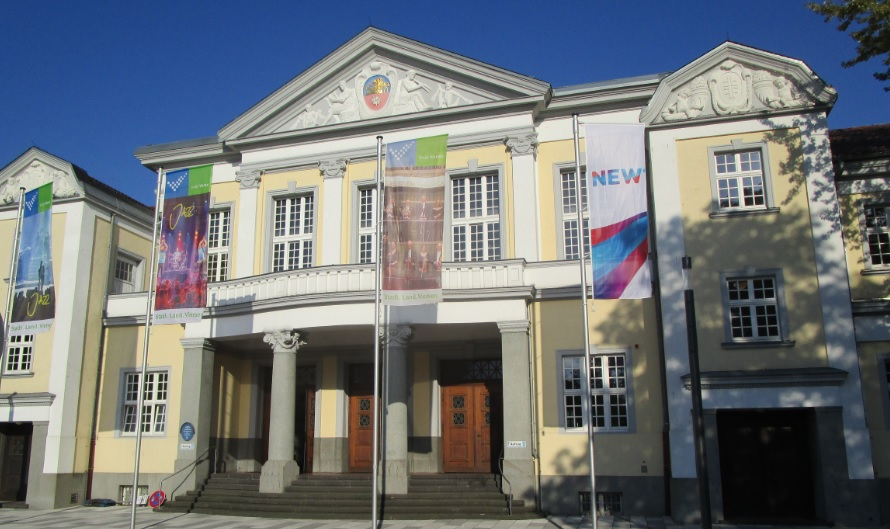
Overview 3 – Festhalle Viersen

The UMB World Three-cushion Championship for National Teams is a professional carom billiards tournament in the discipline of three-cushion billiards where nations are represented by a team of two players. After the first three editions, which took place in various nations and were not scheduled regularly, the Union Mondiale de Billard decided to keep the championships situated in Viersen, Germany and to organize these championships annually.

== List of champions ==
Below is the list of winning nations since 1981. From 2004 on, no third-place match was played and the third place was shared by the two semi-final losing teams.

Year	Location	Gold		Silver		Bronze	
1981	Mexico City	Japan; Nobuaki Kobayashi; Junichi Komori	1.237	Belgium; Raymond Ceulemans; Ludo Dielis	1.232	France; Edigio Vierat; Richard Bitalis	0.953
1985	(France) Bordeaux	Japan; Nobuaki Kobayashi; Junichi Komori	1.311	Sweden; Torbjörn Blomdahl; Lennart Blomdahl	1.058	United States; Frank Torres; Allen Gilbert	1.103
1987	(Spain) Madrid	Sweden; Torbjörn Blomdahl; Lennart Blomdahl	1.017	United States; Frank Torres; Allen Gilbert	0.960	Japan; Joji Kai; Yoshio Yoshihara	1.074
1990	(West Germany) Viersen	Japan; Joji Kai; Yoshio Yoshihara	1.114	Sweden; Torbjörn Blomdahl; Lennart Blomdahl	1.177	(West Germany) Germany; Christian Rudolph; Günter Siebert	1.064
1991	(Germany) Viersen	Sweden; Torbjörn Blomdahl; Lennart Blomdahl	1.246	Denmark; Tonny Carlsen; Hans Laursen	1.044	Germany; Hans-Jürgen Kühl; Christian Rudolph	1.118
1992	(Germany) Viersen	Japan; Nobuaki Kobayashi; Junichi Komori	1.218	United States; Sang Lee; Frank Torres	1.159	Portugal; Manuel Ribeiro; Jorge Theriaga	1.096
1993	(Germany) Viersen	Germany; Maxime Aguirre; Christian Rudolph	1.104	Netherlands; Dick Jaspers; Louis Havermans	1.120	Sweden; Torbjörn Blomdahl; Lennart Blomdahl	1.182
1994	(Germany) Viersen	Germany; Maxime Aguirre; Christian Rudolph	1.252	Portugal; Ribeiro; Jorge Theriaga	1.073	Germany; Johann Schirmbrand; Christian Zöllner	1.004
1995	(Germany) Viersen	Denmark; Dion Nelin; Jacob Haack-Sørensen	1.145	Sweden; Lennart Blomdahl; Mats Noren	1.133	Portugal; Manuel Fradinho; Jorge Theriaga	1.073
1996	(Germany) Viersen	Denmark; Hans Laursen; Dion Nelin	1.181	Japan; Reiji Ichinose; Joji Kai	1.067	Spain; José Quetglas; Dani Sánchez	1.199
1997	(Germany) Viersen	Germany; Christian Rudolph; Johann Schirmbrand	1.156	Austria; Andreas Efler; Gerhard Kostistansky	1.210	Japan; Tatsuo Arai; Reiji Ichinose	1.014
1998	(Germany) Viersen	Netherlands; Raimond Burgman; Dick Jaspers	1.540	Spain; Javier Minguell; Dani Sánchez	1.182	Germany; Martin Horn; Christian Rudolph	1.321
1999	(Germany) Viersen	Netherlands; Raimond Burgman; Dick Jaspers	1.478	Sweden; Torbjörn Blomdahl; Michael Nilsson	1.489	Germany; Martin Horn; Christian Rudolph	1.245
2000	(Germany) Viersen	Sweden; Torbjörn Blomdahl; Michael Nilsson	1.553	Netherlands; Raimond Burgman; Dick Jaspers	1.430	Denmark; Dion Nelin; Jacob Haack-Sørensen	1.214
2001	(Germany) Viersen	Sweden; Torbjörn Blomdahl; Michael Nilsson	1.546	Germany; Martin Horn; Christian Rudolph	1.444	Denmark; Tonny Carlsen; Dion Nelin	1.255
2002	(Germany) Viersen	Germany; Martin Horn; Christian Rudolph	1.381	Netherlands; Anno de Kleine; Dick Jaspers	1.503	Turkey; Tayfun Taşdemir; Adnan Yüksel	1.258
2003	(Germany) Viersen	Turkey; Semih Sayginer; Tayfun Taşdemir	1.412	Greece; Filippos Kasidokostas; Nikos Polychronopoulos	1.400	Netherlands; Anno de Kleine; Dick Jaspers	1.707
Year	Location	Gold		Silver		Losing semi-finalists	
2004	(Germany) Viersen	Turkey Semih Sayginer Tayfun Taşdemir	1.514	Belgium Frédéric Caudron Peter de Backer	1.362	Spain; Alfonso Legazpi; Dani Sánchez	1.302
2004	(Germany) Viersen	Turkey Semih Sayginer Tayfun Taşdemir	1.514	Belgium Frédéric Caudron Peter de Backer	1.362	France; Jérémy Bury; Jean Christoph Roux	1.164
2005	(Germany) Viersen	Sweden Torbjörn Blomdahl Michael Nilsson	1.414	Netherlands Jean Paul de Bruijn Dick Jaspers	1.377	Belgium; Eddy Leppens; Eddy Merckx	1.471
2005	(Germany) Viersen	Sweden Torbjörn Blomdahl Michael Nilsson	1.414	Netherlands Jean Paul de Bruijn Dick Jaspers	1.377	Germany; Martin Horn; Christian Rudolph	1.050
2006	(Germany) Viersen	Sweden Torbjörn Blomdahl Michael Nilsson	1.421	Germany Martin Horn Christian Rudolph	1.412	Netherlands; Raimond Burgman; Dick Jaspers	1.647
2006	(Germany) Viersen	Sweden Torbjörn Blomdahl Michael Nilsson	1.421	Germany Martin Horn Christian Rudolph	1.412	Turkey; Semih Sayginer; Adnan Yüksel	1.531
2007	(Germany) Viersen	Sweden Torbjörn Blomdahl Michael Nilsson	1.537	Denmark Tonny Carlsen Brian Knudsen	1.217	Netherlands; Raimond Burgman; Dick Jaspers	1.526
2007	(Germany) Viersen	Sweden Torbjörn Blomdahl Michael Nilsson	1.537	Denmark Tonny Carlsen Brian Knudsen	1.217	Germany; Martin Horn; Christian Rudolph	1.164
2008	(Germany) Viersen	Sweden Torbjörn Blomdahl Michael Nilsson	1.664	Netherlands Raimond Burgman Dick Jaspers	1.593	(South Korea) South-Korea; Choi Sung-won; Kim Kyung-roul	1.584
2008	(Germany) Viersen	Sweden Torbjörn Blomdahl Michael Nilsson	1.664	Netherlands Raimond Burgman Dick Jaspers	1.593	Spain; Ricardo García; Dani Sánchez	1.549
2009	(Germany) Viersen	Sweden Torbjörn Blomdahl Michael Nilsson	1.769	Belgium Roland Forthomme Eddy Merckx	1.588	Germany; Martin Horn; Christian Rudolph	1.607
2009	(Germany) Viersen	Sweden Torbjörn Blomdahl Michael Nilsson	1.769	Belgium Roland Forthomme Eddy Merckx	1.588	(South Korea) South-Korea; Kang Dong-gung; Kim Kyung-roul	1.560
2010	(Germany) Viersen	Turkey Murat Naci Çoklu Adnan Yüksel	1.689	Spain Rubén Legazpi Dani Sánchez	1.456	Netherlands; Raimond Burgman; Dick Jaspers	1.831
2010	(Germany) Viersen	Turkey Murat Naci Çoklu Adnan Yüksel	1.689	Spain Rubén Legazpi Dani Sánchez	1.456	(South Korea) South-Korea; Choi Sung-won; Kim Kyung-roul	1.516
2011	(Germany) Viersen	Turkey Lütfi Cenet Tayfun Taşdemir	1.510	Belgium Eddy Leppens Eddy Merckx	1.652	Netherlands; Raimond Burgman; Dick Jaspers	1.570
2011	(Germany) Viersen	Turkey Lütfi Cenet Tayfun Taşdemir	1.510	Belgium Eddy Leppens Eddy Merckx	1.652	Germany; Stefan Galla; Martin Horn	1.250
2012	(Germany) Viersen	Belgium Frédéric Caudron Eddy Merckx	1.884	Germany Stefan Galla Martin Horn	1.504	Spain; Javier Palazón; Dani Sánchez	1.640
2012	(Germany) Viersen	Belgium Frédéric Caudron Eddy Merckx	1.884	Germany Stefan Galla Martin Horn	1.504	Denmark; Thomas Andersen; Tonny Carlsen	1.282
2013	(Germany) Viersen	Belgium Frédéric Caudron Eddy Merckx	1.640	Germany Martin Horn Christian Rudolph	1.371	Turkey; Murat Naci Çoklu; Tayfun Taşdemir	1.580
2013	(Germany) Viersen	Belgium Frédéric Caudron Eddy Merckx	1.640	Germany Martin Horn Christian Rudolph	1.371	(South Korea) South-Korea; Heo Jung-han; Kim Kyung-roul	1.397
2014	(Germany) Viersen	Belgium Frédéric Caudron Eddy Merckx	2.295	Netherlands Dick Jaspers Barry van Beers	1.486	Germany; Martin Horn; Steffan Galla	1.412
2014	(Germany) Viersen	Belgium Frédéric Caudron Eddy Merckx	2.295	Netherlands Dick Jaspers Barry van Beers	1.486	Turkey; Tayfun Taşdemir; Tolgahan Kiraz	1.314
2015	(Germany) Viersen	Belgium Frédéric Caudron Eddy Merckx	1.968	South Korea Heo Jung-han Cho Jae-ho	1.867	Turkey; Tayfun Taşdemir; Adnan Yüksel	1.427
2015	(Germany) Viersen	Belgium Frédéric Caudron Eddy Merckx	1.968	South Korea Heo Jung-han Cho Jae-ho	1.867	Netherlands; Dick Jaspers; Barry van Beers	1.693
2016	(Germany) Viersen	Netherlands Dick Jaspers Jean van Erp	1.675	Turkey Semih Saygıner Lütfi Çenet	1.491	Belgium; Frédéric Caudron; Eddy Merckx	1.700
2016	(Germany) Viersen	Netherlands Dick Jaspers Jean van Erp	1.675	Turkey Semih Saygıner Lütfi Çenet	1.491	Austria; Arnim Kahofer; Andreas Efler	1.287
2017	(Germany) Viersen	(South Korea) South Korea Choi Sung-won Kim Jae-guen	1.515	(Belgium) Belgium Frédéric Caudron Roland Forthomme	1.701	(Netherlands) Netherlands; Dick Jaspers; Jean van Erp	1.923
2017	(Germany) Viersen	(South Korea) South Korea Choi Sung-won Kim Jae-guen	1.515	(Belgium) Belgium Frédéric Caudron Roland Forthomme	1.701	(France) France; Jérôme Barbeillon; Cédric Melnytschenko	1.260
2018	(Germany) Viersen	(South Korea) South Korea Choi Sung-won Kang Dong-koong	1.920	Austria Arnim Kahofer Andreas Efler	1.273	Turkey; Semih Sayginer; Tayfun Taşdemir	1.394
2018	(Germany) Viersen	(South Korea) South Korea Choi Sung-won Kang Dong-koong	1.920	Austria Arnim Kahofer Andreas Efler	1.273	Denmark; Tonny Carlsen; Thomas Andersen	1.472
2019	(Germany) Viersen	(Turkey) Turkey Murat Naci Çoklu Lütfi Çenet	1.803	(Netherlands) Netherlands Raimond Burgman Dick Jaspers	1.529	(South Korea) South Korea; Kim Haeng-jik; Cho Jae-ho	1.431
2019	(Germany) Viersen	(Turkey) Turkey Murat Naci Çoklu Lütfi Çenet	1.803	(Netherlands) Netherlands Raimond Burgman Dick Jaspers	1.529	(Belgium) Belgium; Frédéric Caudron; Eddy Merckx	1.713
2022	(Germany) Viersen	(Turkey) Turkey Tayfun Taşdemir Can Çapak	1.729	(Colombia) Columbia Pedro Gonzalez Huberney Cataño	1.410	(Spain) Spain; Dani Sánchez; Rubén Legazpi	1.610
2022	(Germany) Viersen	(Turkey) Turkey Tayfun Taşdemir Can Çapak	1.729	(Colombia) Columbia Pedro Gonzalez Huberney Cataño	1.410	(Germany) Germany; Martin Horn; Ronny Lindemann	1.211
2023	(Germany) Viersen	(Turkey) Turkey Semih Sayginer Tayfun Taşdemir	1.818	Sweden Torbjörn Blomdahl Michael Nilsson	1.680	(Spain) Spain; Dani Sánchez; Rubén Legazpi	1.578
2023	(Germany) Viersen	(Turkey) Turkey Semih Sayginer Tayfun Taşdemir	1.818	Sweden Torbjörn Blomdahl Michael Nilsson	1.680	(Netherlands) Netherlands; Dick Jaspers; Jean Paul de Bruijn	1.512
2024	(Germany) Viersen	(Vietnam) Vietnam Trần Quyết Chiến Bao Phương Vinh	1.695	(Spain) Spain Rubén Legazpi Sergio Jiménez	1.347	(Japan) Japan; Ryuuji Umeda; Takao Miyashita	1.206
2024	(Germany) Viersen	(Vietnam) Vietnam Trần Quyết Chiến Bao Phương Vinh	1.695	(Spain) Spain Rubén Legazpi Sergio Jiménez	1.347	(United States) United States; Raymon Groot; Hugo Patino	1.180
2025	(Germany) Viersen	(Netherlands) Netherlands Dick Jaspers Jean Paul de Bruijn	1.556	(Vietnam) Vietnam Trần Quyết Chiến Bao Phương Vinh	1.642	(Belgium) Belgium; Peter Ceulemans; Roland Forthomme	1.339
2025	(Germany) Viersen	(Netherlands) Netherlands Dick Jaspers Jean Paul de Bruijn	1.556	(Vietnam) Vietnam Trần Quyết Chiến Bao Phương Vinh	1.642	(Turkey) Turkey; Berkay Karakurt; Ufuk Kapusiz	1.319
2026	(Germany) Viersen	(Vietnam) Vietnam Trần Quyết Chiến Nguyễn Trần Thanh Tự	1.739	(Germany) Germany Martin Horn Amir Ibraimov	1.478	(Sweden) Sweden; Torbjörn Blomdahl; David Pennor	1.583
2026	(Germany) Viersen	(Vietnam) Vietnam Trần Quyết Chiến Nguyễn Trần Thanh Tự	1.739	(Germany) Germany Martin Horn Amir Ibraimov	1.478	(Colombia) Colombia; Pedro González; Huberney Cataño	1.258

== Medals (1981-2026) ==
Rank	Nation	Gold	Silver	Bronze	Total
1	Sweden	9	5	2	16
2	Turkey	7	1	7	15
3	Netherlands	4	7	8	19
4	Germany	4	5	10	19
5	Belgium	4	5	4	13
6	Japan	4	1	3	8
7	Denmark	2	2	4	8
8	South Korea	2	1	6	9
9	Vietnam	2	1	0	3
10	Spain	0	3	6	9
11	United States	0	2	2	4
12	Austria	0	2	1	3
13	Portugal	0	1	2	3
14	Colombia	0	1	1	2
15	Greece	0	1	0	1
16	France	0	0	3	3
Totals (16 entries)		38	38	59	135
