= Michael Ian Shamos =

American mathematician (born 1947)

- Born: April 21, 1947 (age 79)
- Education: A.B: Princeton University; M.A: Vassar College; M.S: American University; M.S:PhD: Yale University
- Known for: computational geometry electronic voting security digital libraries
- Scientific career
- Fields: Theoretical computer science
- Workplaces: Carnegie Mellon University
- Thesis: Computational Geometry (1978)

Michael Ian Shamos (born April 21, 1947) is an American computer scientist, mathematician, attorney, author, and billiards historian. He is a Distinguished Career Professor in the School of Computer Science at Carnegie Mellon University (CMU), where he directs a graduate program in Artificial Intelligence and Innovation and has held a range of leadership roles in computing, digital libraries, electronic voting, and technology law. Shamos is known for his work in computational geometry, electronic voting security, digital libraries, and his extensive scholarship on the game of billiards.

== Education ==
He earned an A.B. in Physics from Princeton University in 1968, completing a senior thesis titled Gravitational Radiation Reaction under the supervision of John A. Wheeler, followed by an M.A. in Physics from Vassar College in 1970 with a thesis entitled An Absorber Theory of Acoustical Radiation. He received an M.S. in Technology of Management from American University in 1972, and completed his graduate studies in computer science at Yale University, earning an M.S., M.Phil., and Ph.D. between 1973 and 1978, with a doctoral dissertation titled Computational Geometry. He subsequently earned a J.D., cum laude, from Duquesne University in 1981.

== Academic career ==
Shamos joined Carnegie Mellon University in 1975 as an Assistant Professor in the Departments of Computer Science and Mathematics, later also holding an appointment in Statistics, and has since held a wide range of senior academic and administrative positions at the university.

His appointments have included Distinguished Career Professor in the Language Technologies Institute and the Software and Social Systems Department of the School of Computer Science (from 2001), Principal Systems Scientist (1998–2001), Principal Lecturer (2002–2003), and Teaching Professor (from 2003).

He has also served on the faculty of the Tepper School of Business (1999–2004), and was Co-Director of the Carnegie Mellon Institute for eCommerce (1998–2004), Vice-Chair of the University Research Council (2000–2002), Director of the eBusiness Technology degree program (2003–2018), Director of the M.S. in Artificial Intelligence and Innovation program (from 2018), Director of the Universal Library at Carnegie Mellon (from 1998), and as an affiliated or core faculty member in initiatives focused on privacy engineering, social-cybersecurity, and informed democracy. In addition, he served as Visiting Professor in the Faculty of Engineering at the University of Hong Kong from 2001 to 2021.

== Research and Scholarly Contributions ==
=== Computational Geometry ===
Shamos was an early pioneer in computational geometry, with Franco P. Preparata he co-authored the foundational textbook Computational Geometry: An Introduction, which became a standard reference in the field during its early development.

=== Electronic Voting and Security ===
From 1980–2000 (and again after 2004), Shamos served as a statutory examiner of electronic voting systems for the Commonwealth of Pennsylvania and for the Attorney General of Texas, personally overseeing the certification and examination of over 120 different voting systems. He testified on voting security issues before the U.S. Congress and several state legislatures, and he authored influential technical analyses like Electronic Voting - Evaluating the Threat and Paper vs. Electronic Voting Records.

Shamos has also served as an expert witness in over 400 technology-related legal cases, including software, electronic voting, intellectual property, and trade secret disputes.

=== Digital Libraries ===
As a Director of CMU’s Universal Library project, Shamos played a leadership role in large-scale book digitization efforts that helped inspire broader initiatives such as the Google Books project to make millions of volumes available online.

=== Intellectual Property Law and Technology Policy ===
A practicing attorney admitted to the bar of Pennsylvania, the U.S. Patent and Trademark Office and the U.S. Supreme Court, Shamos was a shareholder at the Webb Law Firm, has worked in intellectual property law and consulted on computer-related patent and copyright cases.

== Awards ==
He was a fellow of Sigma Xi (1974–83), had an IBM Fellowship at Yale University (1974–75), was SIAM National Lecturer (1977–78), distinguished lecturer in computer science at the University of Rochester (1978), visited McGill University (1979), and belonged to the Duquesne University Law Review (1980–81). He won the first annual Black & White Scotch Achiever's Award in 1991 for contributions to bagpipe musicography, and the Industry Service Award of the Billiard and Bowling Institute of America, 1996, for contributions to billiard history. Since 2001 he is a Billiard Worldcup Association official referee.

=== Billiards and Non-Academic Scholarship ===
He is the Curator of The Billiard Archive and a Contributing Editor of the monthly Billiards Digest, in which he has published over 750 articles. His non-academic work includes extensive research, writing, and service roles in billiards organizations such as the Billiard Congress of America and the Billiard Worldcup Association. He received the Industry Service Award of the Billiard and Bowling Institute of America, 1996, for contributions to billiard history. In 2001 he was certified as a Billiard Worldcup Association official referee for three-cushion billiards.

== Selected publications ==
- Preparata, F. P.; Shamos, M.I. (2012-12-06). Computational Geometry: An Introduction. Springer Science & Business Media. ISBN 978-1-4612-1098-6.
- Shamos, M. I. (1993). Electronic Voting — Evaluating the Threat. (ACM Computers, Freedom & Privacy).
- · Shamos, M. I. (2004). Paper v. Electronic Voting Records — An Assessment. (ACM Computers, Freedom & Privacy).
- Shamos, M. I., & Vora, P. L., et al. (2004). Evaluation of Voting Systems. Communications of the ACM, 47(11).
- "Pool - Shamos, Michael Ian: 9780792453109 - AbeBooks". www.abebooks.com.
- Shamos, M.I (1998). Shooting pool. Internet Archive. New York : Artisan. ISBN 978-1-885183-95-8.
- Shamos, M.I; Shamos, Michael Ian (2000). The Complete Book of Billiards. Gramercy Books. ISBN 978-0-517-20869-4.
- Shamos, M.I (2002). The New Illustrated Encyclopedia of Billiards: Completely Revised and Updated - Softcover. Lyons Pr. ISBN 9781585746859.
