= Royal Dutch Billiards Federation =

The Royal Dutch Billiards Federation (Dutch: Koninklijke Nederlandse Biljart Bond, KNBB) was founded in 1911 to coordinate, within the Netherlands, billiards, pool and snooker. The union is affiliated with the Union Mondiale de Billard, Confédération Européenne de Billard and NOC * NSF . The Head Office is located in the Blokhoeve district of Nieuwegein.

In 2018, the KNBB introduced a mathematics based pool game called "smart pool", which was rolled out to play by schoolchildren across Europe.
