= XTB =

XTB or xtb may refer to:

- XTBs (exchange-traded bond units), securities traded on the Australian Securities Exchange
- Chazumba Mixtec (ISO 639 code: xtb), a language
- XTB S.A., a brokerage firm
- AZLK or Moskvitch, (world manufacturer identifier: XTB; See Vehicle identification number)
- GFNn-xTB, a series of tight-binding semi-empirical quantum chemistry methods

== See also ==
- XTB-1, a Boeing TB (or Model 63), an American torpedo bomber biplane
