= Mazin Shooni =

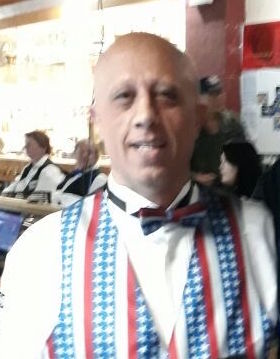
Mazin Shooni at the 2017 Verhoeven Open

Mazin Shooni (Arabic: مازن شوني) is an Iraqi-born American three-cushion billiards player. He was born on August 25, 1961, in Baghdad, Iraq. Currently, he lives in Nashua, New Hampshire.

== Palmares ==
He holds the record for USBA National Three-Cushion Championship tournament high run and best game. He was inducted into the New England Billiard Hall of Fame in 2011. He won the USBA National Three-Cushion Championship in 2006. He was also a tournament director in the 2003 event.

His high run is 22 and has achieved a game average of 6.25 (25 points in 4 innings).

Mazin also owns and operates a pool room in Peabody, Massachusetts called "Amazin Billiards & Pub". There are twenty professional pool tables and four three-cushion billiards tables. The room caters to the professional player.

| Preceded by Sonny Cho | USBA National Three-cushion Champion; 2006 | Succeeded by Pedro Piedrabuena |
