= Avelino Rico =

Spanish carom billiards player (1931–2026)

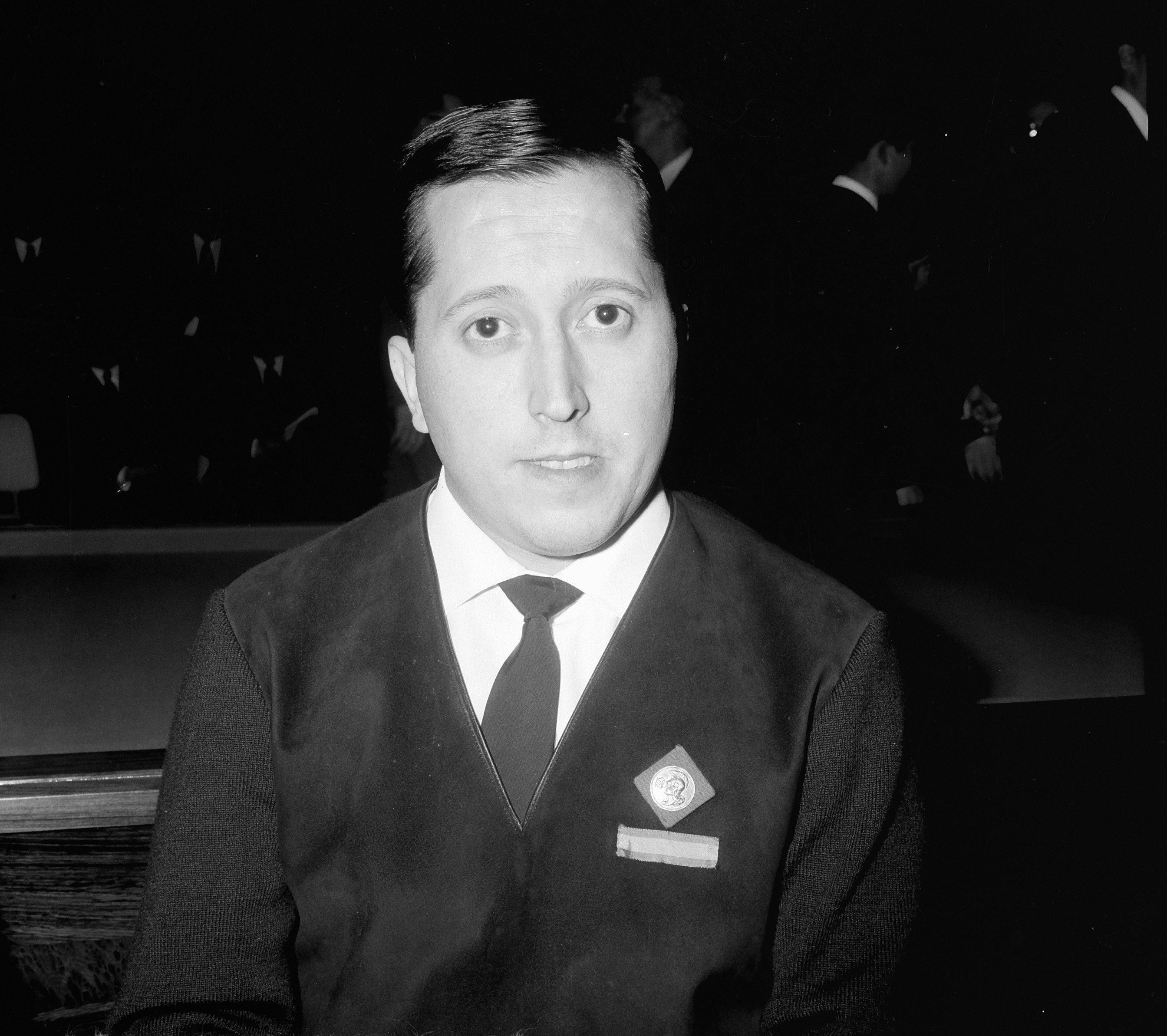
- Rico in 1964

Personal information
- Born: 12 February 1931 Bustantigo, Spain
- Died: 13 June 2026 (aged 95) Madrid, Spain

Pool career
- Country: Spain

Avelino Rico (12 February 1931 – 13 June 2026) was a Spanish carom billiards player. He won at the UMB World Three-cushion Championship in 1986, winning matches against Torbjörn Blomdahl and Raymond Ceulemans. In the same year, he placed second at the CEB European Three-cushion Championship.

Rico died in Madrid on 13 June 2026, at the age of 95.
