= André Gagnaux =

André Gagnaux (died February 1996), who was a Swiss, was the first President of the World Confederation of Billiard Sports (WCBS) and the former President of the Union Mondiale de Billard (UMB).

He was credited for the foundation of WCBS in 1992, when he first tried to contact various governing body of billiards sports since 1985 in order to fulfill the recognition criteria of the International Olympic Committee (IOC), that a recognized sport must be governed by only one international sport federation. After various discussion with the World Professional Billiards and Snooker Association (WPBSA). At last, he called for a meeting on 30 August 1990 in Bristol, UK, with the presence of all the three major cue sports representatives, namely, carom, pool and snooker. As a result, it was decided to form the World Confederation of Billiard Sports (WCBS), an umbrella organization encompassing all billiards sports, and a three-man committee consisting of Gagnaux himself for Carom, Jorgen Sandman for Pool and Mark Wildman for Snooker was appointed in order to work out the first constitution, to serve as a guideline for this new body. The following 18 months were spent on this work, which was somewhat complicated since the idea was to enable the various disciplines to work closely together, while maintaining their independence.

The inaugural General Assembly of the WCBS was held in Yverdon-les-Bains, Switzerland, on 25 January 1992. Gagnaux was elected as the first President of the confederation, an office he carried until 1996. He took ill during the second half of 1995, at which time he passed on his immediate tasks to Jorgen Sandman who took over as President in January 1996, just one month before he died.
