= Tayfun Taşdemir =

Turkish professional carom billiards player (born 1975)

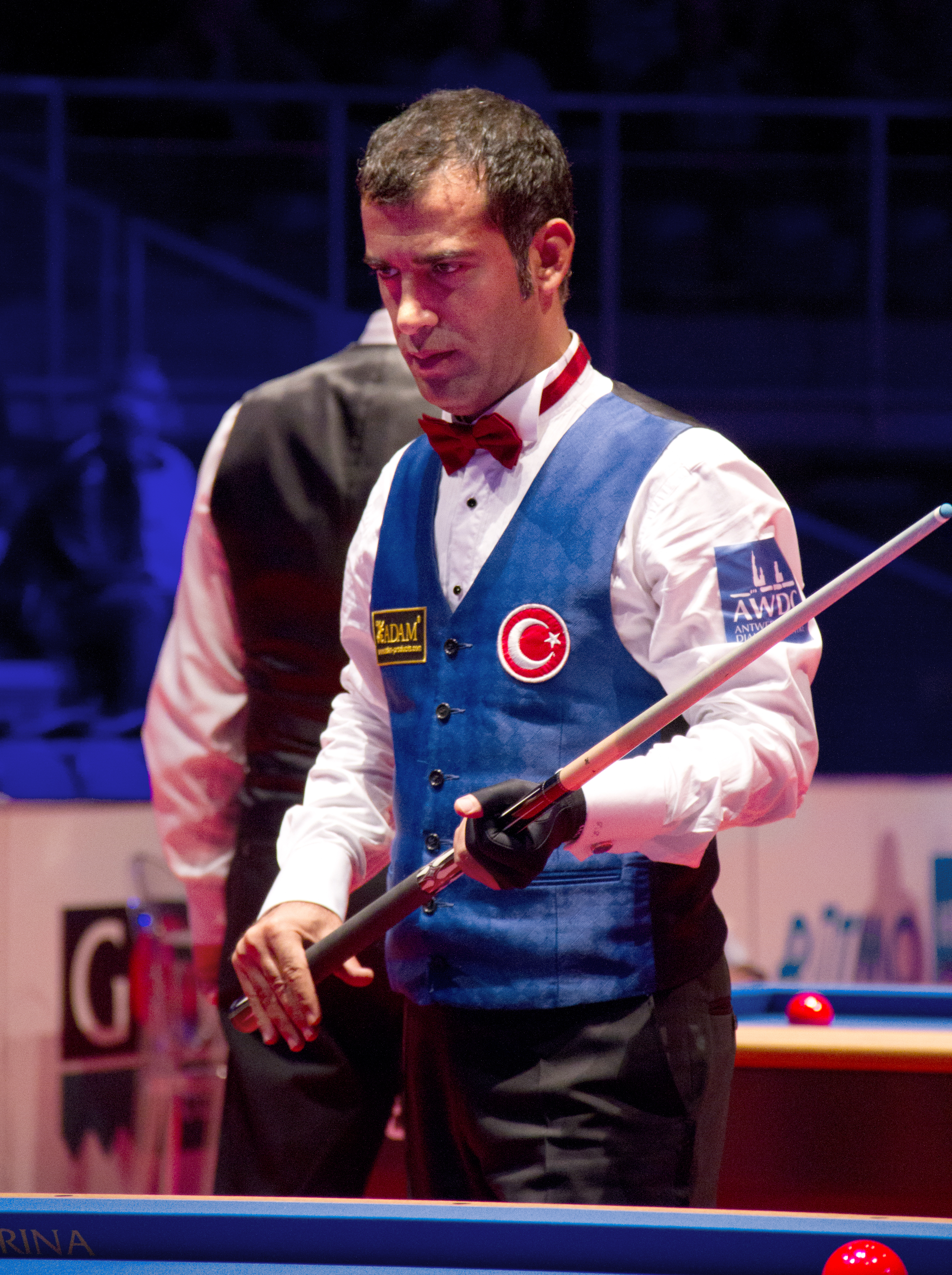
- Tayfun Taşdemir at the 2013 3-cushion World Championship-

Personal information
- Born: 5 November 1975 (age 50) Muş, Turkey

Sport
- Country: Turkey
- Sport: Snooker

Tayfun Taşdemir
Medal record

Representing Turkey

Men's Three-cushion billiards

UMB World Championship
Bronze medal – third place	2002 Viersen	Team
Gold medal – first place	2003 Viersen	Team
Gold medal – first place	2004 Viersen	Team
Gold medal – first place	2011 Viersen	Team
Bronze medal – third place	2013 Viersen	Team
Bronze medal – third place	2014 Viersen	Team
Bronze medal – third place	2015 Viersen	Team
Bronze medal – third place	2018 Viersen	Team
Gold medal – first place	2022 Donghae City	Individual
Gold medal – first place	2022 Viersen	Team
Gold medal – first place	2023 Viersen	Team

CEB European Three-cushion Championship
Bronze medal – third place	2009 Odense	Individual
Bronze medal – third place	2010 Sankt Wendel	Individual

Tayfun Taşdemir (born November 5, 1975) is a former world champion Turkish professional carom billiards player specialized in three-cushion event.

== Early years ==
Tayfun Taşdemir was born in Muş, eastern Turkey on November 5, 1975. He graduated in Economics from Marmara University.

== Career ==
He played three years for the Dutch team Twentevisie.

After enjoying World team champion titles several times, Taşdemir finally won his first individual world-class level title at the 3rd leg of the 2015 Three-Cushion World Cup in Ho Chi Minh City, Vietnam defeating Torbjörn Blomdahl from Sweden in the final. He also won the 1st leg of the 2019 Three-Cushion World Cup in Antalya, Turkey defeating Cho Jae-ho.

At the 2022 UMB World Three-cushion Championship held in Donghae City, South Korea, he became World champion in the individual event. He is the second Turkish World champion after Semih Saygıner, who won the title in 2003.

== Achievements ==
2002

- (bronze) UMB World Three-cushion Championship for National Teams, Viersen, Germany

2003

- (gold) UMB World Three-cushion Championship for National Teams, Viersen, Germany

2004

- (gold) UMB World Three-cushion Championship for National Teams, Viersen, Germany

2005

- (bronze) Three-Cushion World Cup Leg 4, Istanbul, Turkey

2006

- (bronze) Three-Cushion World Cup Leg 5, Istanbul, Turkey

2009

- (bronze) Three-Cushion World Cup Leg 1, Sluiskil, Netherlands
- (bronze) Three-Cushion World Cup Leg 5, Hurghada, Egypt
- (bronze) CEB European Three-cushion Championship, Odense, Denmark

2010

- (bronze) Three-Cushion World Cup Leg 2, Suwon, South Korea
- (bronze) CEB European Three-cushion Championship, Sankt Wendel, Germany

2011

- (gold) UMB World Three-cushion Championship for National Teams, Viersen, Germany

2012

- (silver) Three-Cushion World Cup Leg 1, Antalya, Turkey

2013

- (bronze) Three-Cushion World Cup Leg 3, Corinth, Greece
- (silver) Three-Cushion World Cup Leg 5, Hurghada, Egypt
- (bronze) UMB World Three-cushion Championship for National Teams, Viersen, Germany

2014

- (bronze) UMB World Three-cushion Championship for National Teams, Viersen, Germany

2015

- (gold) Three-Cushion World Cup Leg 3, Ho Chi Minh City, Vietnam
- (silver) Three-Cushion World Cup Leg 4, Guri, South Korea
- (bronze) UMB World Three-cushion Championship for National Teams, Viersen, Germany

2022

- (gold) UMB World Three-cushion Championship, Donghae City, South Korea
