= Pedro Leopoldo Carrera =

Argentinian carom billiards player

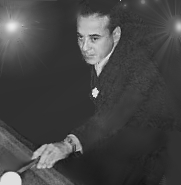
Pedro Leopoldo Carrera

Pedro Leopoldo Carrera (19 June 1914 – 2 September 1963) was an Argentine carom billiards player and the first player to set a general average of 1,000 or more. Carrera was a five time carom billiards world champion. He won the straight rail world championship in 1950 and 1953, the 47.2 balkline world championship in 1951, and the Union Internationale des Fédérations des Amateurs de Billard (UIFAB) World Three-cushion Championship in 1952 and UIFAB pentathlon world cup in 1954. In 1980, more than 17 years after his death, Carrera was awarded the Premios Konex in platinum posthumously as the best billiard player in Argentine history and also with the "Diploma al Mérito".

== Championships ==
Carrera won five world championships across various balkline and straight rail disciplines, and won 20 national championships:

- UMB World Three-cushion Championship: 1952
- Pentathlon World Cup : 1954
- Free game world championship : 1950, 1953
- Cadre 47/2 World Championship : 1951
- Three-Band Pan American Championships : 1950
- Pan-American championships (5 championships)
- Argentine championships (20 championships)
