= African Carom Confederation =

African federation for carom billiards

- Established: 25 March 2013
- President: Alsharif Alhussein
- Vice-President: Moustafa Elhouny
- Vice-President: Paul Bileng Miaka
- Secretary-General: Mohamed Elmotiz Elmutsim
- Website: ACC on UMB

The African Carom Confederation (ACC) is the African continental federation for carom billiards. It is a member of the world federation Union Mondiale de Billard (UMB) and was founded on 25 March 2013 in Cairo.

== History ==
At the General Assembly of UMB, held in December 2012 in Valencia, Spain, the president of the Egyptian Federation of Billiards Sports (EFBS), El Sharif Al Hussein, announced that EFBS would disaffiliate from Confédération Européenne de Billard (CEB), the European Association for carom billiards, of which EFBS was a member since its foundation in 1958, and would create their own African Association.

Supported by EFBS, the UMB President Jean-Claude Dupont and representatives from seven other founding members from Algeria, Cameroon, Congo, Libya, Morocco, South Africa and Sudan met on 25 March 2013 in Cairo, the capital of Egypt. The delegates agreed to set up a confederation under the name "African Carom Confederation" (ACF), with a board of administration composed of representative from each member association. El Sharif Al Hussein was elected unanimously as the first President of the ACF. The ratification of the founding Treaty was completed, with necessary changes, before 30 April 2013.

In the same year, the first continental "African Cup" was held. It took place together with the Three-Cushion World Cup, which took place in Hurghada in December 2013. With the establishment of ACF, the fourth continental federation, the UMB hoped to strengthen its position in the world of international sports.

== Members ==
- Algeria
- Egypt
- Cameroon
- Republic of the Congo
- Libya
- Morocco
- South Africa
- Sudan

== See also ==
- Asian Carom Billiard Confederation (ACBC)
- Confédération Européenne de Billard (CEB)
- Confederación Panamericana de Billar (CPB)
