= World Confederation of Billiards Sports =

International sport governing body

- Abbreviation: WCBS
- Formation: January 25, 1992; 34 years ago
- Founded at: Yverdon-les-Bains, Switzerland
- Type: Sports federation
- Legal status: Nonprofit organization
- Headquarters: Avenue Verdeil 1; 1005 Lausanne; Switzerland
- Coordinates: 46°31′01″N 6°38′51″E
- Members: 135 national associations
- Official language: English
- Secretary General: Diane Wild
- President: Ian Anderson (Australia)
- Website: www.wcbs.sport

The World Confederation of Billiards Sports (WCBS) is the international umbrella organization encompassing the major cue sports (billiards-type games), including carom billiards, pool games of several varieties, and snooker.

The confederation was formed in Yverdon-les-Bains, Switzerland, on January 25, 1992. Its headquarters were previously located in Sint-Martens-Latem, Belgium. Jean-Claude Dupont, of Belgium, served as WCBS' president from 2010 to 2015, followed by England's Jason Elliott Ferguson for 2015–2017. Australia's Ian Anderson became the confederation's ninth president in 2017.

The World Confederation of Billiards Sports (WCBS) has 135 member national federations, as well as continental bodies for Africa, the Americas, Asia, Europe, and Oceania. WCBS, in turn, is affiliated with many international sports organizations, such as the International Olympic Committee (IOC), General Association of International Sports Federations (GAISF), International World Games Association (IWGA) and Commonwealth Games Federation (CGF). Its statutes, practices and activities all conform to the Olympic Charter.

== Role ==
The primary aim of WCBS is to establish billiard-type sports as medal events in as many multiple-sports competitions as possible, on both regional and world levels. The ultimate goal of WCBS is to have billiard sports included in the Olympic Games.

The WCBS serves as platform for its associated groups: The Union Mondiale de Billard (UMB); the World Pool-Billiard Association (WPA); and the International Billiards and Snooker Federation (IBSF). These groups work closely together, but the independence of each organization is maintained and respected. As a result, unlike other international sports organizations, the WCBS does not set the rules of the sports nor organize any international competition itself. Instead, these functions are carried out by the associated organizations.

== History ==
Before the establishment of WCBS in 1992, there was no single organization representing all cue sports, which was necessary to meet the requirements of the International Olympic Committee (IOC). Moreover, cue sports did not meet the official definition of a sport. These were the main obstacles to gaining approval for the inclusion of cue sports in the Olympic Games, despite many attempts to achieve Olympic recognition that have been made since the 1950s.

In 1985, André Gagnaux, of Switzerland, became the new president of the UMB, the world governing body for carom billiards. In an attempt to achieve Olympic recognition, he contacted the WPBSA, the governing body of professional snooker, to discuss the possibility of forming a governing body for all cue sports. There was no world governing body for pool at that time. Nonetheless, his first attempt failed as he could not convince the WPBSA why it would be important for them to achieve IOC recognition, and what possible cooperation with the UMB could do to further their goals.

=== Founding and organization ===
Following the founding of the WPA as the international governing body for pool and their successful organization of the first WPA World Nine-ball Championship in 1990, Gagnaux contacted the WPBSA again. This time he was more successful. In order to fulfill the conditions set by the IOC, the representatives of the governing bodies of the three main cue sports convened on August 30, 1990, at a meeting in Bristol, UK, with the WPBSA as the host. This was the first time representatives of the three divisions gathered around one table. As a result, it was decided to form the World Confederation of Billiard Sports (WCBS), an umbrella organization encompassing all billiards sports, and a three-man committee (consisting of Gagnaux for carom, Jorgen Sandman for pool and Mark Wildman for snooker) was appointed to write the first constitution for the new organization. Eighteen months were spent devising a way to enable the various disciplines to work closely together, while maintaining their independence. The inaugural General Assembly of the WCBS was held in Yverdon-les-Bains, Switzerland on January 25, 1992. A board consisting of nine delegates was elected with three representatives from each founding member: the UMB, the WPA and the new World Snooker Federation (WSF), formed by cooperation between the WPBSA and the IBSF. The office of president rotated, so that all three divisions take a turn at heading the organization.

=== Dissension ===
In September 2002, the WPBSA informed the IBSF that it was no longer interested in cooperating with the latter, and the WPBSA withdrew from the WCBS. For unknown reason, the IBSF failed to share this information with the WCBS board, and it was only due to rumors that the WCBS finally was informed of the situation. Having failed to impress the IBSF about the importance of resolving this dispute, a board meeting was held in Bottrop, Germany, in March 2003. The IBSF representatives, although formally invited, did not show up for this meeting. This did not prevent the WCBS from deciding to declare the snooker component of the WCBS temporarily vacant. The IBSF, displeased with this decision, turned to the IOC Court of Arbitration for Sports in Lausanne, Switzerland on May 30, 2003. The CAS delivered its final decision on January 20, 2004, and the WCBS won the case on all counts. Since then the WPBSA has returned to the WCBS, now in its own right as a direct member. IBSF remains a member as well, and the WSF has dissolved.

Since the election of the sixth president, Pascal Guillaume of France, in late 2004, all parties have agreed to try and work constructively together for the future benefit of the sport. Guillaume has pledged a policy of unification.

== Accomplishments ==
=== GAISF membership ===
In 1992, the first goal for the newly formed WCBS was to gain recognition by the IOC and obtain membership in the General Association of International Sports Federations (GAISF). In October 1993, the WCBS was invited to be an observer at the GAISF Congress and General Assembly in Lahti, Finland. However, the WCBS application failed to make it into the agenda of the AGM (Annual General Meeting), so the two WCBS representatives at this meeting, (André Gagnaux and Jorgen Sandman), could only listen and learn. In October 1994, when the GAISF AGM took place in Monte Carlo, Monaco, the WCBS application was on the agenda. A discussion about whether billiards could be considered a sport led to a compromise wherein the GAISF would define what constituted a sport, meaning the issue would have to be tabled for a year.

Meanwhile, the IOC had responded to their application for recognition by stating that the WCBS was too new, so any possible IOC recognition could not be granted immediately. The IOC also recommended that the WCBS should apply for membership with the GAISF, stating that "whilst this is not a prerequisite, the IOC would look favorably on a WCBS membership with the GAISF."

In October 1995 the GAISF Congress and General Assembly was held in Seoul, Korea. André Gagnaux became ill and was hospitalized, so the WCBS delegation was led by Jorgen Sandman, who was accompanied by Nigel Oldfield (Great Britain) and Massimino Del Prete (Italy). The WCBS had learned from the failures of 1993 and 1994, and was better prepared to present its case. The main feature of their presentation was a glossy brochure entitled Right on Cue, a professional overview of billiards sports, which was distributed among the delegates. The WCBS also hosted a cocktail reception for the approximately 500 attending officials. At AGM, the WCBS finally became a provisional member of the GAISF. Any new organization entering the GAISF must first be a provisional member for two years before they are accepted as a full member with voting rights.

=== IOC recognition and participation in the World Games ===
In July 1996, the IOC decided to grant the WCBS a provisional recognition for two years. In September of the same year the WCBS became a member of the Association of IOC Recognised International Sports Federations (ARISF). An application for membership with the International World Games Association (IWGA) was also filed shortly thereafter, and at the 1997 IWGA AGM it was decided that the WCBS would be granted membership as of January 1, 1998.

On February 5, 1998, the IOC granted the WCBS full recognition, clarifying the status of billiards sports as true sports. Later, the GAISF accepted the WCBS as a full member at the 1999 AGM and the IWGA decided to include billiards sports into the program of the 2001 Akita World Games.

The WCBS also applied for the inclusion in the 2004 Summer Olympics. Among 15 other sports that had applied for inclusion, the Greek Olympic Committee decided to consider five, billiards sports among them. It selected two sports out of the five, with billiards sports ending up as their third choice.

=== Cue sports in other events ===
Apart from the 2001 World Games, cue sports have been included in many different important multi-sports events, such as the World Youth Games in Moscow and the 1998 Bangkok Asian Games. There were 10 medals of cue sports in the 1998 Asian Games.

Participation at the 2002 Asian Games in Pusan, Korea was in jeopardy, mostly due to financial concerns that the host city had. But, in the end, billiards sports were in competition for 10 medals. Later, they were included in the 2006 Asian Games in Doha, Qatar.

The WCBS has also tried to get billiards sports included in the Commonwealth Games. While the WCBS has been accepted as a member of the Commonwealth Games Federation (CGF), the attempt at inclusion has not yet succeeded.

Attempts from WCBS have also been made for inclusion into other events like the Pan-American Games, the All-Africa Games and the Mediterranean Games.

== See also ==
- Glossary of cue sports terms
