= Asian Pocket Billiard Union =

Regional governing body for pocket billiards

Asian Pocket Billiard Federation (APBU) is the management of the Asian pocket billiards. Asian Pocket Billiard Union is headquartered in Taipei City, Taiwan.

== APBU members ==
National affiliate members of APBU as of November 2011:

Asian Pocket Billiard Union (APBU)

Bangladesh
Brunei
People's Republic of China
Chinese Taipei
Hong Kong
India
Indonesia
Iran

Japan
South Korea
Kuwait
Macau
Malaysia
Maldives
Philippines
Qatar

Saudi Arabia
Singapore
Sri Lanka
Thailand
United Arab Emirates
Vietnam
