= United States Billiard Association =

United States Billiards Association
- Abbreviation: USBA
- Type: Non-profit Institution
- Purpose: Carom Billiards Sanctioning Organization
- Website: www.usba.net

The United States Billiard Association or USBA is the governing body for all professional carom billiards tournaments in the United States, especially three-cushion billiards.

Each year since 1968, the USBA and its predecessor organization the Billiard Federation of the USA has held a tournament to crown the national champion. In 1989 the USBA was formed by the merger of BFUSA and American Billiard Association.

== USBA National Three-Cushion Championship ==
Year	Location	Winner	Avg.
1968	California	(United States) Allen Gilbert	0,729
1969	California	(United States) Bill Hynes	0,710
1970	California	(United States) Allen Gilbert	0,870
1971	California	(United States) Allen Gilbert	0,818
1972	Oregon	(United States) Eddie Robin	0.846
1973	Oregon	(United States) John Bonner	0,685
1974	California	(United States) Frank Torres	0,750
1975	California	(United States) John Bonner	0,725
1976	California	(United States) George Ashby	0,995
1977	California	(United States) Allen Gilbert	0,934
1978	California	(United States) Frank Torres	0,835
1979	California	(United States) Eddie Robin	0,889
1980	California	(United States) Harry Sims	0,848
1981	California	(United States) George Ashby	0,929
1982	California	(United States) Carlos Hallon	0,929
1983	California	(United States) Harry Sims	1,054
1984	California	(United States) George Ashby	1,018
1985	California	(United States) Frank Torres	1,094
1986	California	(United States) Carlos Hallon	0,953
1987	California	(United States) Frank Torres	1,074
1988	New York	(United States) Allen Gilbert	N/A
1989	Florida	(United States) Carlos Hallon	1,104
1990	New York	(United States) Sang Lee	1,471
1991	California	(United States) Sang Lee	1,464
1992	Illinois	(United States) Sang Lee	1,591
1993	California	(United States) Sang Lee	1,489
1994	Illinois	(United States) Sang Lee	1,536
1995	New York	(United States) Sang Lee	1,835
1996	California	(United States) Sang Lee	1,552
1997	New York	(United States) Sang Lee	1,492
1998	California	(United States) Sang Lee	1,478
1999	Florida	(United States) Sang Lee	1,503
2000	Washington	(United States) Sang Lee	1,216
2001	Georgia	(United States) Sang Lee	1,756
2002	California	(United States) Pedro Piedrabuena	1,190
2003	Michigan	(United States) Hugo Patino	1,223
2004	New York	(United States) Pedro Piedrabuena	1,438
2005	Washington	(United States) Sonny Cho	1,142
2006	Florida	(United States) Mazin Shooni	1,268
2007	California	(United States) Pedro Piedrabuena	1,438
2008	Kentucky	(United States) Miguel Torres	0,970
2009	New York	(United States) Hugo Patino	1,185
2010	Washington	(United States) Jae Hyung Cho	1,201
2011	Nevada	(United States) Pedro Piedrabuena	1,469
2012	Nevada	(United States) Pedro Piedrabuena	1,497
2013	New Jersey	(United States) Pedro Piedrabuena	1,318
2014	Texas	(United States) Pedro Piedrabuena	1,892
2015	New York	(United States) Pedro Piedrabuena	1,448
2016	California	(United States) Hugo Patino	1,473
2017	Arizona	(United States) Pedro Piedrabuena	1,584
2018	Arizona	(United States) Miguel Torres	1,037
2019	Texas	(United States) Hugo Patino	1,481
2020	New York	(United States) Tae Kyu Lee	1,221
2021	New York	(United States) Pedro Piedrabuena	2,000
2022	Illinois	(United States) Pedro Piedrabuena	1,429
2023	Florida	(United States) Pedro Piedrabuena	1,584
2024	California	(United States) Hugo Patino	1,404
2025	New Jersey	(United States) Raymon Groot	1.299
2026	New Jersey	(Colombia) Carlos M. Villegas	1.481

== Top performers ==
Name	Winner
Sang Lee	12
Pedro Piedrabuena	12
Allen Gilbert	5
Hugo Patino	5
Frank Torres	4
Carlos Hallon	3
George Ashby	3
Harry Sims	2
John Bonner	2
Miguel Torres	2
Raymon Groot	1
Carlos M. Villegas	1
