= Confédération Européenne de Billard =

- Logo since 2017
- Formation: 12 July 1958
- Region served: Europe
- Website: www.eurobillard.org

The Confédération Européene de Billard (CEB) is the European governing body of carom billiards and is affiliated to the world federation UMB.

== History ==
The CEB was founding on 12 July 1958 in Geneva. Its predecessor was the Fédération Internationale de Billard (FIB). They and the Union Internationale des Amateurs d'Fédérations de Billiard (UIFAB) competed in 1957 to host the CEB European Three-cushion Championship, and thus two championships were held this year. The dispute had been settled the following year.

The CEB is responsible for the carom billiards sports in Europe in general, and its affiliated national associations.

== Founding members ==
The following 15 organizations are recognized as founding members of the CEB:

- DBB – (Germany) Deutscher Billard Bund
- ÖABV – (Austria) Österreichischer Amateur Billard Verband
- FRBBA – (Belgium) Fédération Royale Belge de Billard Amateurs
- DACC – (United Kingdom) British Billiards Federation
- DDBU – (Denmark) Danish Billiards Federation
- FERAU – (Egypt) Egyptian Federation of Billiards
- FEB – (Spain) Fédération Espagnole de Billard
- FFB – (France) Fédération Française de Billard
- FIBA – (Italy) Fédération Italienne de Billard Amateurs
- FLAB – (Luxembourg) Fédération Luxembourgeoise des Amateurs de Billard
- KNBB – (Netherlands) Koninklijke Nederlandse Biljart Bond, KNBB
- PZB – (Poland) Fédération Polonaise de Billard
- FPB – (Portugal) Fédération Portugaise de Billard
- FSAB – (Switzerland) Fédération Suisse des Amateurs de Billard
- SCKK – (Czech Republic) Fédération Tchécoslovaque des Amateurs de Billard

== Actual members ==
The following 31 organizations were by the 45th General Assembly in April 2009 in Giza / Cairo, members of the CEB:

- ABF – (Albania) Albanian Billard Federation
- BBF – (Bulgaria) Bulgarian Billiard Federation
- BSVÖ – (Austria) Billard Sportverband Österreich
- CBA – (Croatia) Croatian Billiard Association
- CBS – (Czech Republic) Českomoravský Biliarový Svaz
- CBSF – The Cyprus Billiards and Snooker Federation
- DBU – (Germany) Deutsche Billard-Union
- DDBU – (Denmark) Den Danske Billard Union
- EFBS – (Egypt) Egyptian Federation of Billiards Sports
- ΕΦΟΜ – (Greece) Greek Federation of Billiards
- FARB – (Algeria) Fédération Algérienne de Rafle et Billard
- FBSS – (San Marino) Federazione Biliardo Sportivo Sammarinese
- FFB – (France) Fédération Française de Billard
- FIBiS – (Italy) Federazione Italiana Biliardo Sportivo
- FLAB – (Luxembourg) Fédération Luxembourgeoise des Amateurs de Billard
- FPB – (Portugal) Federação Portuguesa de Bilhar
- FRBB – (Belgium) Fédération Royale Belge de Billard
- FSB – (Switzerland) Fédération Suisse de Billard
- FSB – (Slovakia) Slovak Billiard Federation
- ISPA – (Israel) Israël Snooker & Pool Association
- KBS CG – (Montenegro) Karambol Savez Crne Gore
- KNBB – (Netherlands) Koninklijke Nederlandse Biljartbond
- KTBF – (Northern Cyprus) Kıbrıs Türk Bilardo Federasyonu
- LBF – (Lithuania) Lithuanian Billiard Federation
- MABIK – (Hungary) Magyar Biliard Szövetseg
- NBF – (Norway) Norges Biljardforbund
- RBF – (Russia) Russian Billiard Federation
- RFEB – (Spain) Real Federacion Espagñola de Billar
- SBF – (Sweden) Svenska Biljardförbundet
- SBiL – (Finland) Suomen Biljardiliitto
- TBF – (Turkey) Türkiye Bilardo Federasyonu

== Board composition ==
Board composition

== See also ==
- African Carom Confederation (ACC)
- Asian Carom Billiard Confederation (ACBC)
- Confederación Panamericana de Billar (CPB)
