= Christian Rudolph (billiards player) =

German carom billiards player

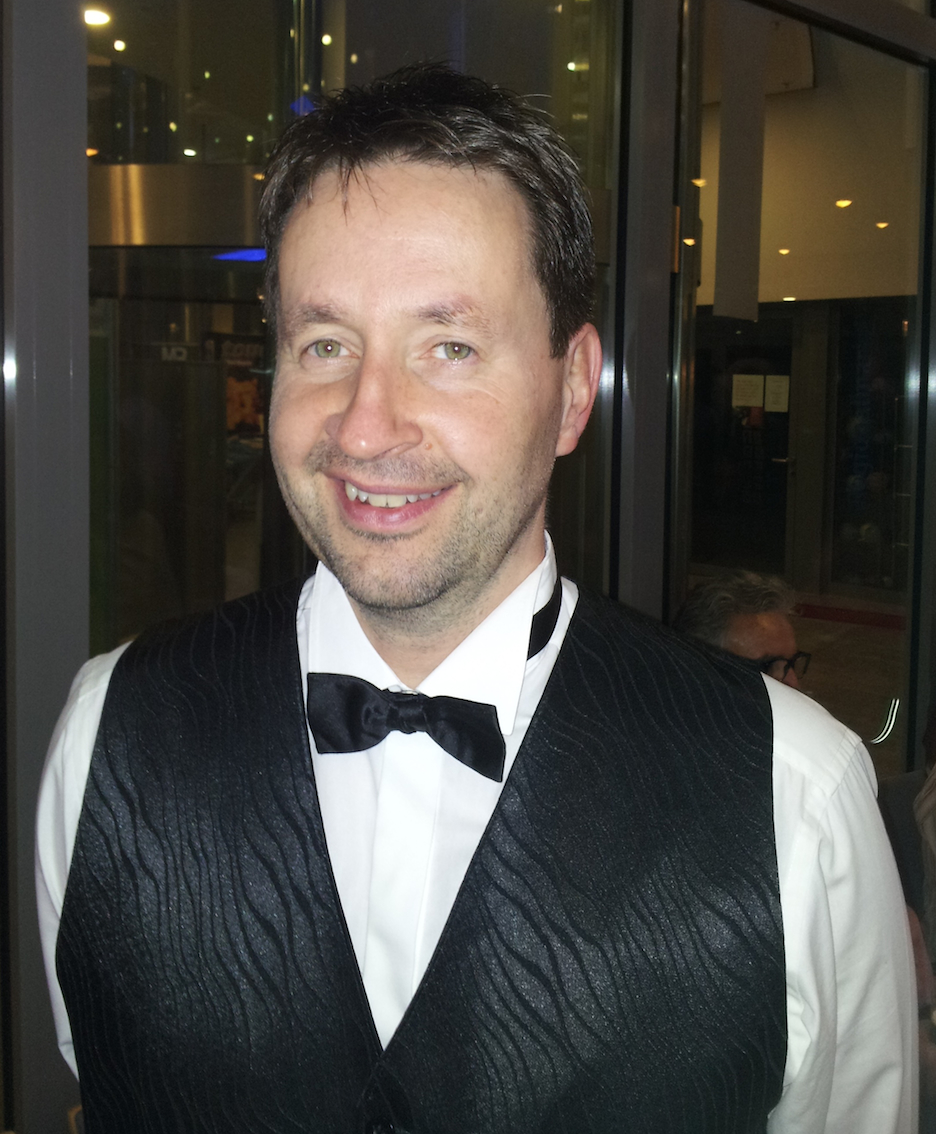
Christian Rudolph 2013 after winning his 9th German Championship in 3-cushion.

Christian Rudolph (born 14 January 1965 in Cologne) is a German carom billiards player and multiple world champion in three-cushion billiards. He is the son of carom billiards champion Ernst Rudolph.

== Personal life ==
His father Ernst, a 17-time German champion and two-time European Vice Champion, was an important German billiard players of the 1950s and 1960s. At the age of nine years Christian was practicing in the two father-operated billiard-halls in Cologne.

Rudolph practices three hours a day at the table and one hour at the gym. He ignored the typical entry into the game of carom billiards, starting with straight rail, and played three-cushion from the beginning on. Rudolph still lives (as of 2017) in his birthplace Cologne.

== Achievements ==
- UMB World Three-cushion Championship: (gold) 1996 • (bronze) 1998
- Three-Cushion World Cup: Overall winner (gold) 1997 (UMB / CEB) • Single (gold) 1997/1, 1997/5
- World Championships for national teams: (gold) 1993, 1994, 1997, 2002 • (silver) 2001 2006 2013 • (bronze) 1990, 1991, 1998, 1999, 2005, 2007, 2009, 2011
- CEB European Three-cushion Championship: Second 2013
- Coupe d'Europe: (gold) 1994, 1996, 1997
- German Champion (3-cushion, single): (gold) 1994, 1996, 1998, 1999, 2000, 2001, 2005, 2011 2013, 2014, 2015 • (silver) 1992, 2008, 2016 • (bronze) 1989, 1990
- German Cup champions (3-cushion, team): (gold) 1988, 1989, 1992, 1994, 1996
- German Grand Prix :
  - Overall winner (gold) 1990, 1992
  - Single Winner (gold) 1990/3, 1990/5, 1991/2, 1991/6, 1992/2, 1992/6, 1993/4, 1994/1, 1994/5, 2008/1, 2008/4, 2012/3, 2010/5
- German Three-cushion Masters : (bronze) 2013
