= Sang Lee =

South Korean-born American billiards player

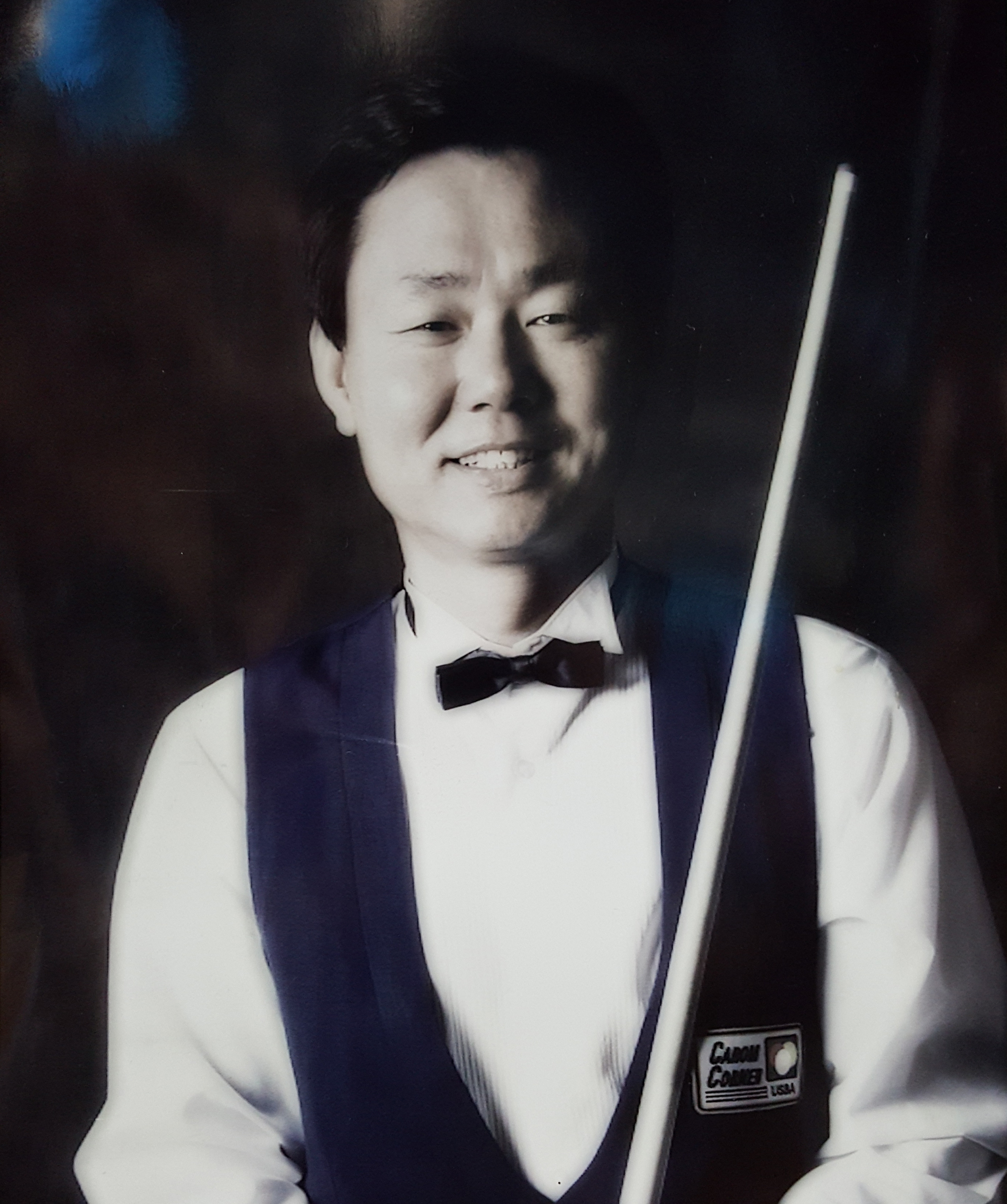

Medal record

Men's three-cushion billiards

Representing the United States

UMB World Championship
Gold medal – first place	1993 Gent	Three-cushion

USBA National Championship
Gold medal – first place	1990	Three-cushion
Gold medal – first place	1991	Three-cushion
Gold medal – first place	1992	Three-cushion
Gold medal – first place	1993	Three-cushion
Gold medal – first place	1994	Three-cushion
Gold medal – first place	1995	Three-cushion
Gold medal – first place	1996	Three-cushion
Gold medal – first place	1997	Three-cushion
Gold medal – first place	1998	Three-cushion
Gold medal – first place	1999	Three-cushion
Gold medal – first place	2000	Three-cushion
Gold medal – first place	2001	Three-cushion

World Games
Bronze medal – third place	2001 Akita	Individual

Asian Games
Silver medal – second place	2002 Busan	Individual

Sang Chun Lee (Korean: 이상천; January 15, 1954 – October 19, 2004), most commonly known simply as Sang Lee, was a Korean-born American professional three-cushion billiards player and world champion.

== Professional career ==
Born and raised in South Korea, Lee moved to New York City, United States, in 1987, at age 33.

Dubbed the "Michael Jordan of three-cushion billiards" at the time of his arrival in the United States, Lee already had eight Korean national titles under his belt. Lee promptly went on to dominate three cushion billiards in the US, winning a record twelve consecutive USBA National Three-Cushion Championship, from 1990 to 2001.

Lee became the UMB World Three-cushion Championship in 1993.

in 1999 he was ranked number 11 among the Billiards Digest "50 Greatest Players of the Century" and ranked 5th "Greatest Living Player of the Century"

At the 2002 USBA National Three-Cushion Championship, his impressive run came to an end when he was defeated by Pedro Piedrabuena in the finals. Aptly, Piedrabuena received his early training in billiards from none other than Lee. The same year, Lee finished 2nd in Three-cushion event of the Asian Games where he was bested by Deuk-Hee Hwang, another Korean cue artist.

As a player, Lee's ambition was "making billiards beautiful in America", – restoring the recognition and competitive level of three-cushion in that part of the world – but he did not live to fulfill it, as he died in 2004 due to stomach cancer.

On May 15, 2007, Lee was inducted into the BCA Hall of Fame.

== Sang Lee International Open ==
Each year after Lee's death, a tournament featuring many of the world's best three-cushion players, known as the Sang Lee International Open, has been hosted at Carom Café in Flushing, Queens, New York, the billiard hall Lee was a co-owner of at the time of his death. 2012 it has been renamed to Verhoeven Open.

Preceded by Carlos Hallon	USBA National Three-cushion Champion; 1990–2001	Succeeded by Pedro Piedrabuena
