= Billiards World Cup Association =

- Merged into: Union Mondiale de Billard (UMB)
- Successor: Union Mondiale de Billard (UMB)
- Formation: 29 December 1985
- Founder: Dr. Werner Bayer †
- Dissolved: 31 December 1999; 26 years ago
- Headquarters: Geneva
- Region served: Switzerland
- President: Dr. Werner Bayer †

The Billiards World Cup Association (BWA) was a governing body for three-cushion carom billiards which organized and marketed the Three-Cushion World Cup from 1985 to 1999. It was subordinate to the Union Mondiale de Billard (UMB).

== History ==
=== The idea ===
In 1985, the "BC 1921 Elversberg", a German carom billiards club, ordered four new carambolage tables from the Belgian company Deque. They expected to be able to negotiate the price a few percent down, however Deque did not agree, but instead, made the suggestion that their official representative, Raymond Ceulemans could hold a demonstration at the inauguration. The club did not hesitate and accepted the offer, since it was rather uncommon to get the then 32-time world champion in three-cushion as a private entertainer.

The show was held on 18 December 1985. For the first time, the club had specially built grandstands. The stands were full as Ceulemans and Klaus Bosel played. After the expected win of Ceulemans’ by more than 50 points, he entertained the crowd with some artistic trick shots before dinner.

Since it was getting late and restaurants were no longer open, Bosel, Ceulemans, and Werner Bayer (former billiards club president) decided to go to Bosel's home, where Bosel's wife cooked for the guests. Midnight was approaching, it was Bosel's birthday and a bottle of champagne was opened, as the three sat together and talked about the future of three band billiards. Ceulemans said, much to the Bayer's amazement, that he still needed to work "properly " to make ends meet. Thus the idea was born to professionalize and market three-cushion billiards.

=== Founding ===
On 29 December 1985, the inaugural meeting was held at the hotel "Goldener Kopf" (English: "Golden Head") in Bad Säckingen near the German Swiss border. Fifteen people came to the establishing assembly. They decided that the seat of the BWA would be Geneva in order to be close to the UMB and the IOC Supporters included, among others, Georg Peltzer, senior director and descendant of Henry Simon Simonis, founder of Simonis Billiard cloth factory in 1680, and Reinhold Würth, senior partner of the Würth Group.
