= Pedro Piedrabuena =

American billiards player

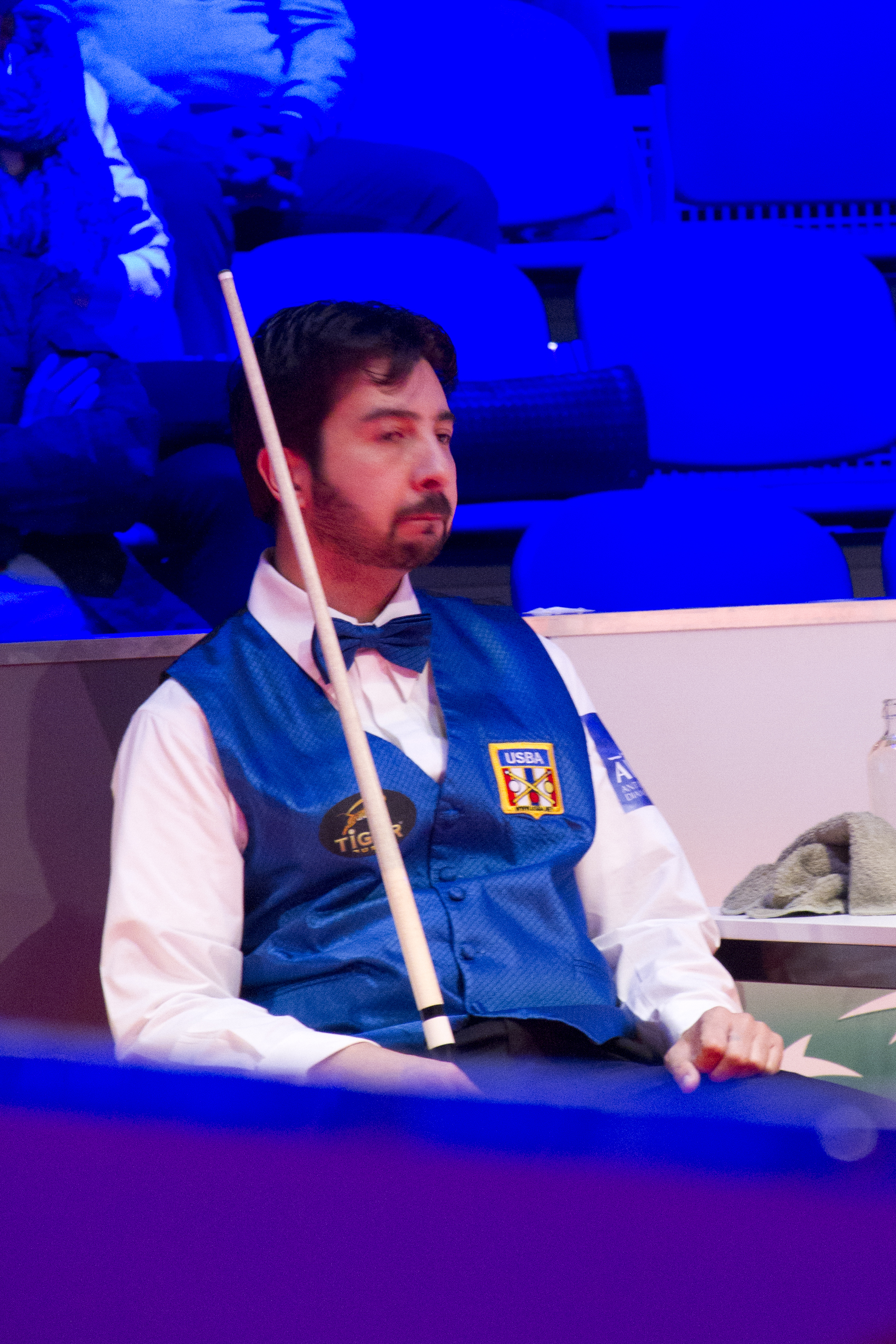

Medal record

Men's three-cushion billiards

Representing the United States

USBA National Championship
| Gold medal – first place | 2002 | Three-cushion |
| Gold medal – first place | 2004 | Three-cushion |
| Gold medal – first place | 2007 | Three-cushion |
| Gold medal – first place | 2011 | Three-cushion |
| Gold medal – first place | 2012 | Three-cushion |
| Gold medal – first place | 2013 | Three-cushion |
| Gold medal – first place | 2014 | Three-cushion |
| Gold medal – first place | 2015 | Three-cushion |
| Gold medal – first place | 2017 | Three-cushion |
| Gold medal – first place | 2021 | Three-cushion |
| Gold medal – first place | 2022 | Three-cushion |

Verhoeven Open
| Gold medal – first place | 2012 | Three-cushion |

Pedro Piedrabuena (born August 21, 1971 in Montevideo) is a Uruguayan-born American professional three-cushion billiards player. He now resides in San Diego, California.

== Professional career ==
After Sang Lee's record 12 consecutive USBA National Three-Cushion Championships from 1990 to 2001, it was Piedrabuena who next took the title, in 2002. After his win in 2002 Piedrabuena went on to win 11 USBA National Three-Cushion Championships, with his most recent win in 2022.

Prior to his move to the United States, Piedrabuena won two Uruguayan titles. His highest run is 26. His best average in a match is 6 (30 points in 5 innings).
