= XTBs =

XTBs (exchange-traded bond units) are a wide range of securities traded on the Australian Securities Exchange (ASX). XTBs seek to combine the income and financial capital stability that is available from corporate bonds, with the transparency and liquidity of the ASX. They were first introduced in May 2015 by the Australian Corporate Bond Company.

In 2023 the two companies behind the XTB range of corporate bond ETFs collapsed.

== Details ==
Each XTB provides investors with exposure to a specific, individual corporate bond, issued in the wholesale, over-the-counter, market in Australia. Similar to exchange-traded funds (ETFs), XTBs are units in a trust. Each Class of XTBs reflects a different individual bond.

Investors can select the individual bonds they wish to gain exposure to from a wide range of XTBs over bonds from issuers from many industries. The issuer may be an Australian bank or a non-financial company like the Woolworths conglomerate or Telstra, or an A-REIT. The Issuers may be wholly owned subsidiaries of listed entities. The coupon (bond) rate may be fixed or floating.

Investors can buy and sell XTBs on the ASX, subject to liquidity. Each XTB reflects the maturity date and coupon payment of its respective underlying bond. The yield and price of each XTB is expected to reflect the yield and price of the underlying bond, after fees and expenses.

Prior to the introduction of XTBs, Australian corporate bonds had effectively only been accessible by institutional investors and had generally not been available through the ASX.
