= Raymond Ceulemans =

Belgian billiard player (born 1937)

Raymond Ceulemans Knight
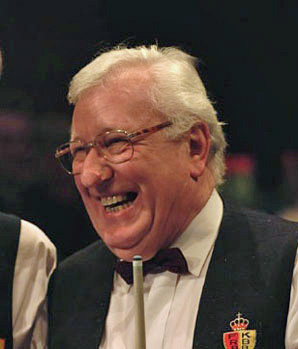
- Raymond Ceulemans in 2011

Personal information
- Nickname: Mr. 100
- Born: 12 July 1937 (age 89) Lier, Belgium

Sport
- Country: Belgium
- Sport: Snooker
- Professional: 1961–2001

Raymond Ceulemans
Medal record

Representing Belgium

Men's Three-cushion billiards

UMB World Championship
Gold medal – first place	Neuss 1963	Three-cushion
Gold medal – first place	Oostende 1964	Three-cushion
Gold medal – first place	Hilversum 1965	Three-cushion
Gold medal – first place	Buenos Aires 1966	Three-cushion
Gold medal – first place	Lima 1967	Three-cushion
Gold medal – first place	Düren 1968	Three-cushion
Gold medal – first place	Tokyo 1969	Three-cushion
Gold medal – first place	Las Vegas 1970	Three-cushion
Gold medal – first place	Groningen 1971	Three-cushion
Gold medal – first place	Buenos Aires 1972	Three-cushion
Gold medal – first place	Cairo 1973	Three-cushion
Gold medal – first place	La Paz 1975	Three-cushion
Gold medal – first place	Ostend 1976	Three-cushion
Gold medal – first place	Tokyo 1977	Three-cushion
Gold medal – first place	Las Vegas 1978	Three-cushion
Gold medal – first place	Lima 1979	Three-cushion
Gold medal – first place	Buenos Aires 1980	Three-cushion
Gold medal – first place	Aix-les-Bains 1983	Three-cushion
Gold medal – first place	Heeswijk-Dinther 1985	Three-cushion
Gold medal – first place	Tokyo 1990	Three-cushion
Gold medal – first place	Luxembourg 2001	Three-cushion
Silver medal – second place	Antwerp 1974	Three-cushion
Silver medal – second place	Tokyo 1991	Three-cushion
Silver medal – second place	Tokyo 1992	Three-cushion
Bronze medal – third place	Krefeld 1984	Three-cushion
Bronze medal – third place	Las Vegas 1986	Three-cushion
Bronze medal – third place	Tokyo 1988	Three-cushion
Bronze medal – third place	Tokyo 1989	Three-cushion

World Cup
Gold medal – first place	1986	Three-cushion
Gold medal – first place	1987	Three-cushion

CEB European Championship
Gold medal – first place	Kaatsheuvel 1962	Three-cushion
Gold medal – first place	Brussels 1963	Three-cushion
Gold medal – first place	Copenhagen 1964	Three-cushion
Gold medal – first place	Vienna 1965	Three-cushion
Gold medal – first place	Lisbon 1966	Three-cushion
Gold medal – first place	Angoulême 1967	Three-cushion
Gold medal – first place	Madrid 1968	Three-cushion
Gold medal – first place	The Hague 1969	Three-cushion
Gold medal – first place	Tournai 1970	Three-cushion
Gold medal – first place	Geel 1971	Three-cushion
Gold medal – first place	Dortmund 1972	Three-cushion
Gold medal – first place	Eeklo 1974	Three-cushion
Gold medal – first place	Rotterdam 1975	Three-cushion
Gold medal – first place	Valencia 1976	Three-cushion
Gold medal – first place	Lausanne 1977	Three-cushion
Gold medal – first place	Copenhagen 1978	Three-cushion
Gold medal – first place	Düren 1979	Three-cushion
Gold medal – first place	Helsingborg 1980	Three-cushion
Gold medal – first place	Vienna 1981	Three-cushion
Gold medal – first place	Porto 1982	Three-cushion
Gold medal – first place	Dunkirk 1983	Three-cushion
Gold medal – first place	Waalwijk 1987	Three-cushion
Gold medal – first place	Cairo 1992	Three-cushion
Silver medal – second place	Vejle 1988	Three-cushion
Bronze medal – third place	Triest 1961	Three-cushion
Bronze medal – third place	Amersfoort 1985	Three-cushion
Bronze medal – third place	Dordrecht 1991	Three-cushion

Raymond Ceulemans (born 12 July 1937) is a Belgian billiards player who won 21 UMB three-cushion World Championship titles, more than any other player. Along with 48 European titles (23 in three-cushion) and 61 national titles. His nickname is "Mr 100". He was inducted into the Billiard Congress of America's Hall of Fame in 2001, one of the first non-Americans to receive the honour.

In October 2003, King Albert II of Belgium honoured Raymond Ceulemans by awarding him a knighthood (Ridderschap) in recognition of his lifetime achievements.

== Early life ==
He was born in Lier, Belgium. By the age of 7, Ceulemans was playing billiards on the table in his father's café. He also liked to play association football at the local club. Although he was a good midfielder (in 1958 he was discovered by the club K. Beerschot V.A.C. but a transfer was never made) he stopped playing football and began to concentrate on billiards.

== Professional career ==
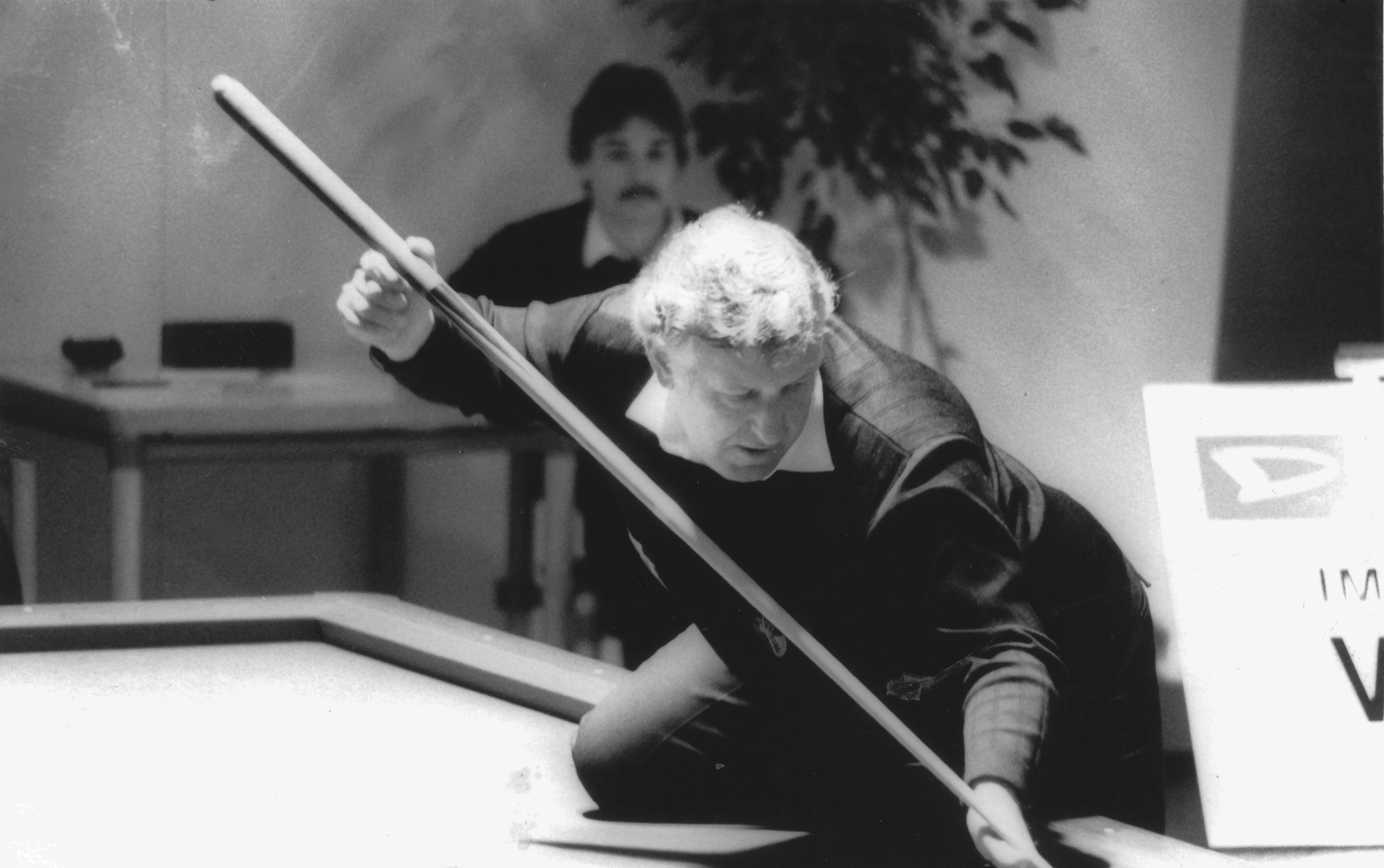
Ceulemans at the 1986 1-cushion European Championship in Dülmen, Germany.

In 1961 at the age of 23 Ceulemans won his first Belgian three-cushion title. In 1962 he won his first CEB European Three-cushion Championship.

A year later he won his first world title at the UMB World Three-cushion Championship with averages of 1.159 and 1.307 points per inning. He went on to win the title 11 times in row. The winning streak came to end in 1974 when he lost to Nobuaki Kobayashi in finals. He was the first three-cushion player to reach levels of 1.500 and 2.000 average points per inning.

Ceulemans won the first Three-Cushion World Cup in Paris, France in 1986; two more titles followed in 1987 and 1990. In 1998 he tied the world record held by Junichi Komori of Japan during professional match play by scoring 28 points in a single inning. (The record was later broken.)

Ceulemans won the European three-cushion championship 23 times and defended it 19 times.

Ceulemans also won 21 UMB World three-cushion championships. Additionally he has prevailed in 16 title defenses.

At the age of 64 Ceulemans won his latest UMB world title in 2001 in Luxembourg where he defeated Marco Zanetti.

== International and national titles ==
- UMB World Three-cushion Championship: 1963–>73, 1975–>80, 1983, 1985, 1990, 2001 (21)
- UMB World One-cushion Championship: 1968, 1976, 1977, 1978, 1979, 1984 (6)
- UMB World Balkline 47/1 Championship: 1976
- UMB World Straight rail Championship: 1969
- UMB World Pentathlon Championship: 1965, 1972, 1974, 1975 (4)
- UMB Three-Cushion World Cup: 1986, 1987, 1989, 1990–2, 1990–4, 1991, 1992, 1993 (8)
- UMB Three-Cushion World Cup Overall Champion: 1986, 1987, 1990 (3)
- UMB Three-cushion Grand Prix: 1987, 1988–1, 1988–3, 1991, 1992, 1995 (6)
- CEB European Three-cushion Championship: 1962–>72, 1974–>83, 1987, 1992 (23)
- CEB European One-cushion Championship: 1963–>1967, 1969, 1970, 1977–>79, 1984–>86 (13)
- CEB European Balkline 71/2 Championship: 1963, 1966, 1968, 1971, 1979 (5)
- CEB European Balkline 47/1 Championship: 1976
- CEB European Pentathlon Championship: 1973, 1979 (2)
- CEB European Pentathlon Championship (national teams): 1969, 1971, 1975, 1992 (4)
- CEB European Cup: 1967,1968, 1969, 1986 (4)
- CEB Grand Prix: 1987, 1988 (2)
- Belgian Three-cushion Championship: 1961, 1962, 1964–>68, 1970–>81, 1984, 1986, 1993, 1999, 2001 (24)
- Belgian Cup: 1992, 1994, 2001 (3)

== Other tournament titles ==
Next to the national, European and world titles, Ceulemans won other national and international tournaments, including

- International Simonis Cup: 9 victories
- Rotterdam Briljant Toernooi: 2 victories in 1991 and 1992
- Wetsteijn toernooi: 1 victory in 1991
- Boerinnekes Pentathlon Antwerp: 15 victories
- Schaal Van Laere tournament Gent: 20 victories

== Records ==
=== UMB World Three-cushion Championship ===
- General Average (GA): 1963 (1,307), 1966 (1,345), 1973 (1,478), 1976 (1,500), 1978 (1,679), 1986 (1,745)
- Special Average (SA): 1963 (2,068), 1966 (2,500), 1986 (2,631)
- High Run (HR): 1974 (14), 1975 (15), 1980 (15)

=== Three-Cushion World Cup ===
- General Average (GA): 1986/2 (1,516)
- High Run (HR): 1999/5 (15)

=== CEB European Three-cushion Championship ===
- General Average (GA): 1963 (1,238), 1969 (1,538), 1971 (1,621), 1991 (1,808)
- Special Average (SA): 1964 (1,764), 1965 (1,818), 1965 (2,068), 1969 (2,222), 1972 (2,875)
- High Run (HR): 1964 (17), 1973 (20)

== Honours and awards ==
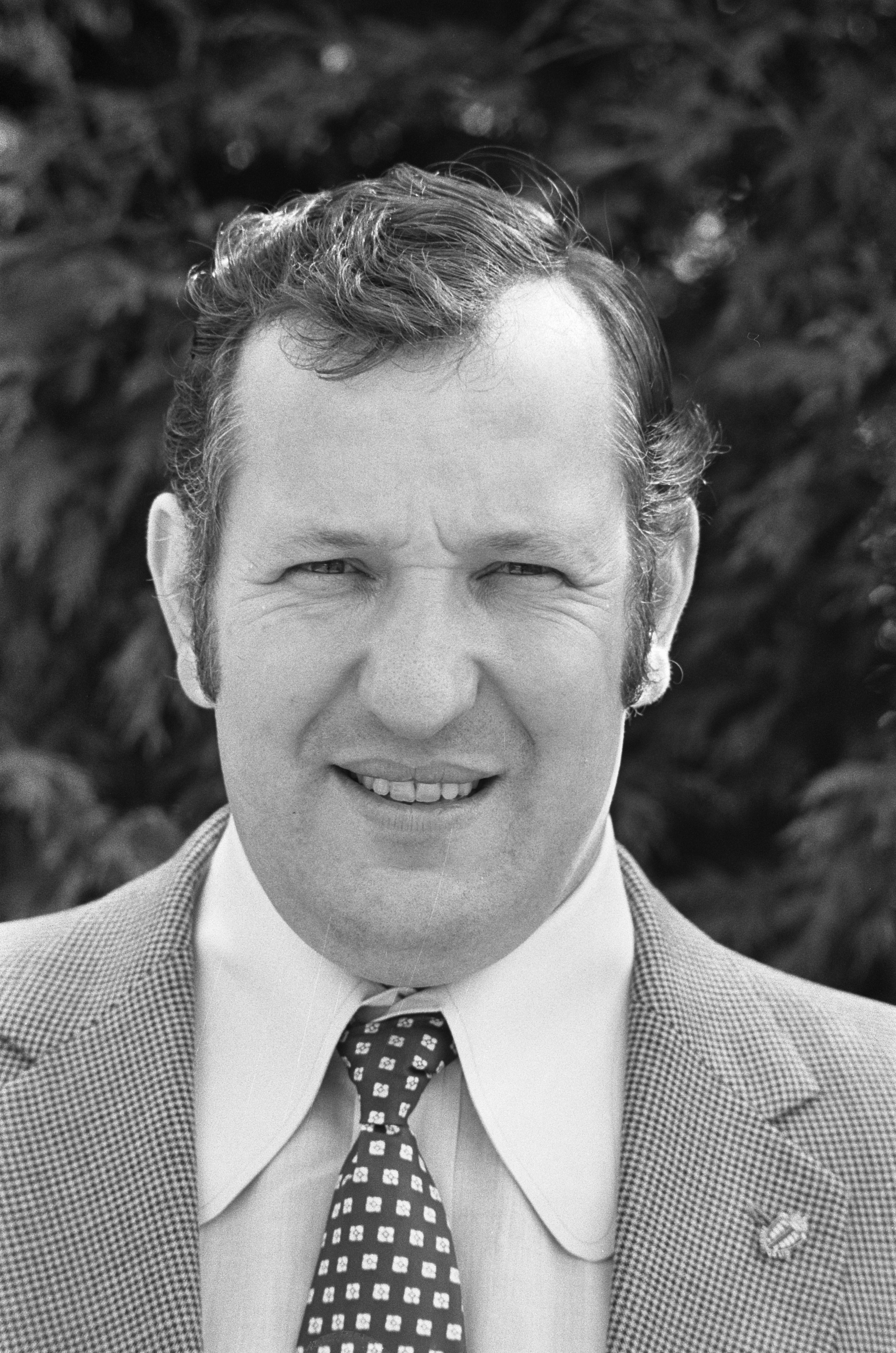
Ceulemans in 1973

- Belgian Sports Merit Award: 1966
- Belgian Sportsman of the Year: 1967
- Honorary member of the Royal Belgian Billiard Association KBBB
- Honorary member of the Royal Dutch Billiard Association KNNB: 1980
- Sportsman of the century of the city Mechelen: 1999
- 3rd Sportsman of the century of the Antwerp province: 2000
- Introduced in the Billiard Congress of America Hall of Fame: 2001
- Knight in the Belgian Order of Leopold II: 2002
- Honorary member of the European Billiard Confederation: 2007
- Trophy of Legends: 2018
