= Asian Carom Billiard Confederation =

Asian governing body of carom billiards

- Headquarters: Nippon Billard Association
- Location(s): 11-5-11-603 Motoakasaka, Minato-ku, 107-0051 Tokyo
- Region served: Asia
- Members: 11
- President: (South Korea) Young Chul Chang
- Confederale delegate: (Japan) Gaku Nishio
- Website: ACBC on UMB.org

The Asian Carom Billiard Confederation (ACBC) is the Asian governing body of carom billiards and is affiliated to the world federation Union Mondiale de Billard (UMB).

== Work ==
The ACBC is responsible for the organisation of international tournaments in Asia. It has currently 11 members, which are responsible for the tournaments at the national level, like the national championships.

== Members ==
The ACBC has currently 11 members:

- CTBA – (Taiwan) Chinese Taipei Billiard Association
- BSFI – Billiards & Snooker Federation of India
- AIBA – (Indonesia) All Indonesian Billiards Association
- NBA – (Japan) Nippon Billiard Association
- JBF – Jordan Billiard Federation
- KBF – (South Korea) Korea Billiards Federation
- LBF – (Lebanon) Lebanese Billiard Federation
- PB & SCP – Philippines Billiards & SCP
- SAB & BSF – (Syria) Syrian Arab Billiards & Bowling Sport Federation
- BSAT – Billiard Sports Association of Thailand
- VBSF – Vietnam Billiards & Snooker Federation

== See also ==
- African Carom Confederation (ACC)
- Confédération Européenne de Billard (CEB)
- Confederación Panamericana de Billar (CPB)
