= Union Mondiale de Billard =

World governing body for carom billiards

- Formation: 1 June 1959; 67 years ago In Spain (1923 UIFAB)
- Members: 71 Nations
- President: Farouk EL Barki
- First Vice-President, PR-director and Finance: Fernando Requena
- Secretary General: Nico van Hanegem
- Parent organization: World Confederation of Billiards Sports (WCBS)
- Website: www.umb-carom.org

The Union Mondiale de Billard (English: 'World Union of Billiards') is the world governing body for carom (carambole) billiard games.

== History ==
Old logo until 2016

The organization was founded in Madrid, Spain on 1 June 1959, and is dedicated to promoting the modern carom billiards games. However, the actual founding of the World Federation took place in 1923 under the name "Union Internationale des Fédérations des Amateurs de Billard" (UIFAB). The UMB monitors and controls international carom competitions and tournaments, and organizes annual team and individual championships in three-cushion billiards and five-pin billiards.

== Work ==
The goals of the UMB include favoring the development of billiard games as sports at the international level, and representing the interests of billiards in general. The UMB provides a permanent and stable liaison with its affiliated regional confederations, and constitutes the largest governing body in carom billiards.

The UMB is a co-founding member, and the sole representative of carom billiards, in the World Confederation of Billiards Sports (WCBS), the international umbrella organization encompassing the major cue sports (billiards-type games), including carom billiards, pool games of several varieties, and snooker.

Four large confederations are recognized by UMB, namely:

- Confédération Européenne de Billard (31) (CEB - European Billiard Confederation),
- Confederación Panamericana de Billar (21) (CPB - Pan-American Billiard Confederation),
- Asian Carom Billiard Confederation (11) (ACBC - Asia and the Pacific)
- African Carom Confederation (8) (ACC).

The national federations subsumed within these broad, regional confederations, along with independent federations in the US, are recognized UMB affiliates. (Note: Some US-based organizations are CPB affiliates, such as the United States Snooker Association.)

== Events ==
- Three-Cushion World Cup
- UMB World Three-cushion Championship
- UMB Women's World Three-cushion Championship
- UMB World Three-cushion Championship for National Teams
- UMB Five-pins Individual World Championship
- UMB Five-pins National Team World Championship
