= Serdar Gümüş =

Turkish billiards player (born 1956)

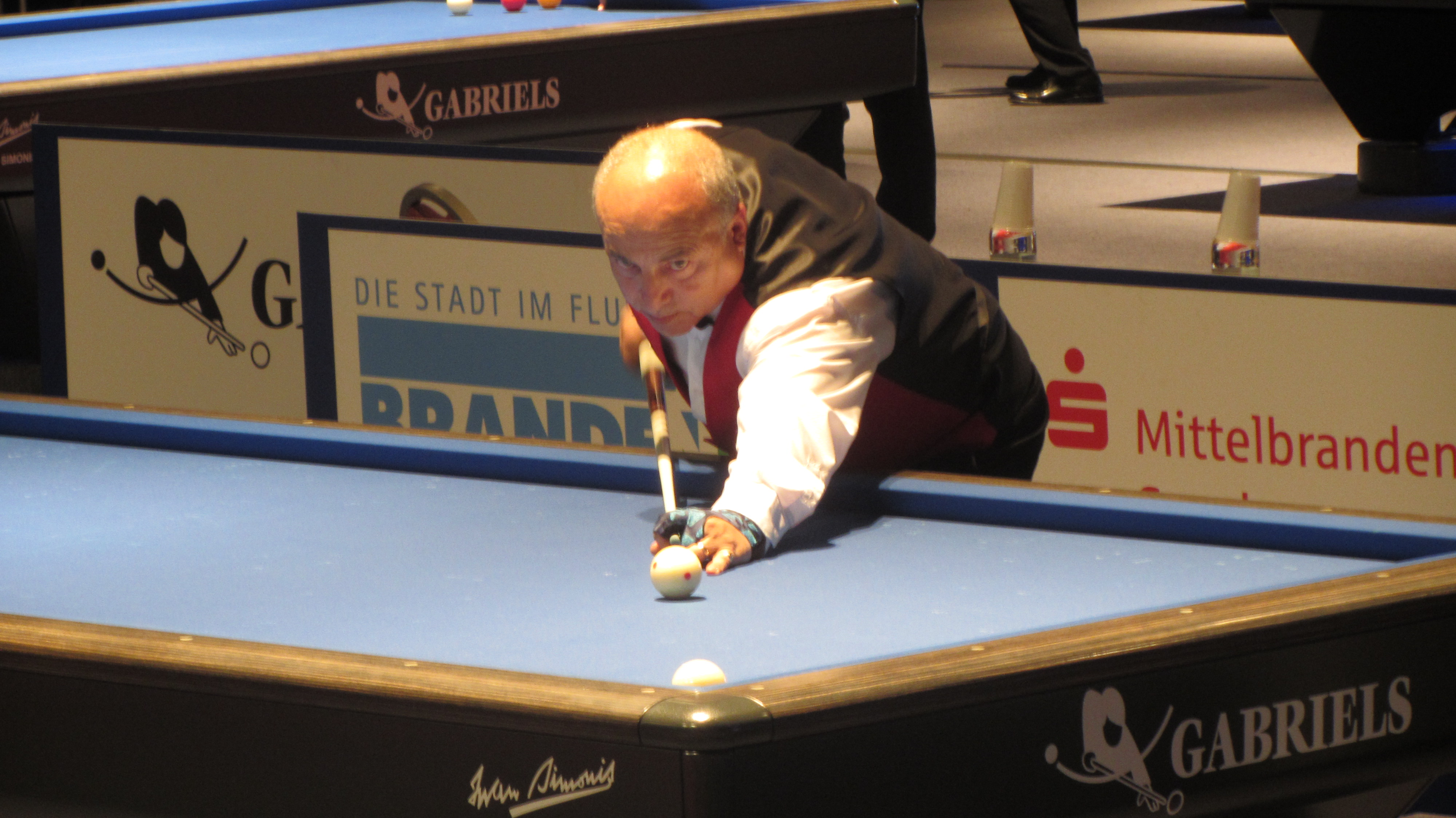

Personal information
- Born: 1956 (age 69–70) Turkey

Pool career
- Country: Turkey

Medal record

Men's artistic billiards

Representing Turkey

World Championship
Bronze medal – third place	2024 Ankara	Individual
Gold medal – first place	2012 Schelle	Individual
Bronze medal – third place	2008 Samsun	Individual

European Championship
Gold medal – first place	2017 Brandenburg	Individual
Gold medal – first place	2015 Brandenburg	Individual
Silver medal – second place	2013 Brandenburg	Individual
Gold medal – first place	2007 Malatya	Individual

Grand Prix
Gold medal – first place	2015 Marseille	Individual

Serdar Gümüş (born 1956) is a Turkish carom and artistic billiards player. He has champion titles at European and world level in artistic billiards.

== Personal life ==
Serdar Gümüş was born in 1956.

Gümüş started billiard playing already at his age of one and half. He remembers that "he and his associates played in billiard halls skipping class", adding that "billiard playing is taught today in the physical education in the schools".

== Sport career ==
Gümüş became European champion in Malat ya, Turkey in 2007 defeating Frenchman Kevin Tran. In 2013, he took the silver medal in the European Championship Artistic in Brandenburg, Germant. He took the bronze medal at the 2008 Artistic Billiards World Championship held in Schelle, Belgium. In 2012, he became champion at the same competition in Samsun, Turkey defeating Dutch Erik Vijverberg in the final. He became Turkish champion defeating Barış Çin, before he captured the gold medal at the 2015 European Championship Artistic in Brandenburg, Germany. The same year, he won another gold medal at the CEB Grand Prix Artistic in Marseille, France. In 2017, he defended his champion title in the final defeating Belgian Walter Bax in three sets at the European Championship in Brandenburg, Germany. the 2023 European Championship Artistic in Antalya, Turkey, he placed fifth among 38 competitors. Gümüş repeated his world third place title of the artistic billiards in Ankara, Turkey.
