= Jean Bessems =

Dutch cue sports player (born 1945)

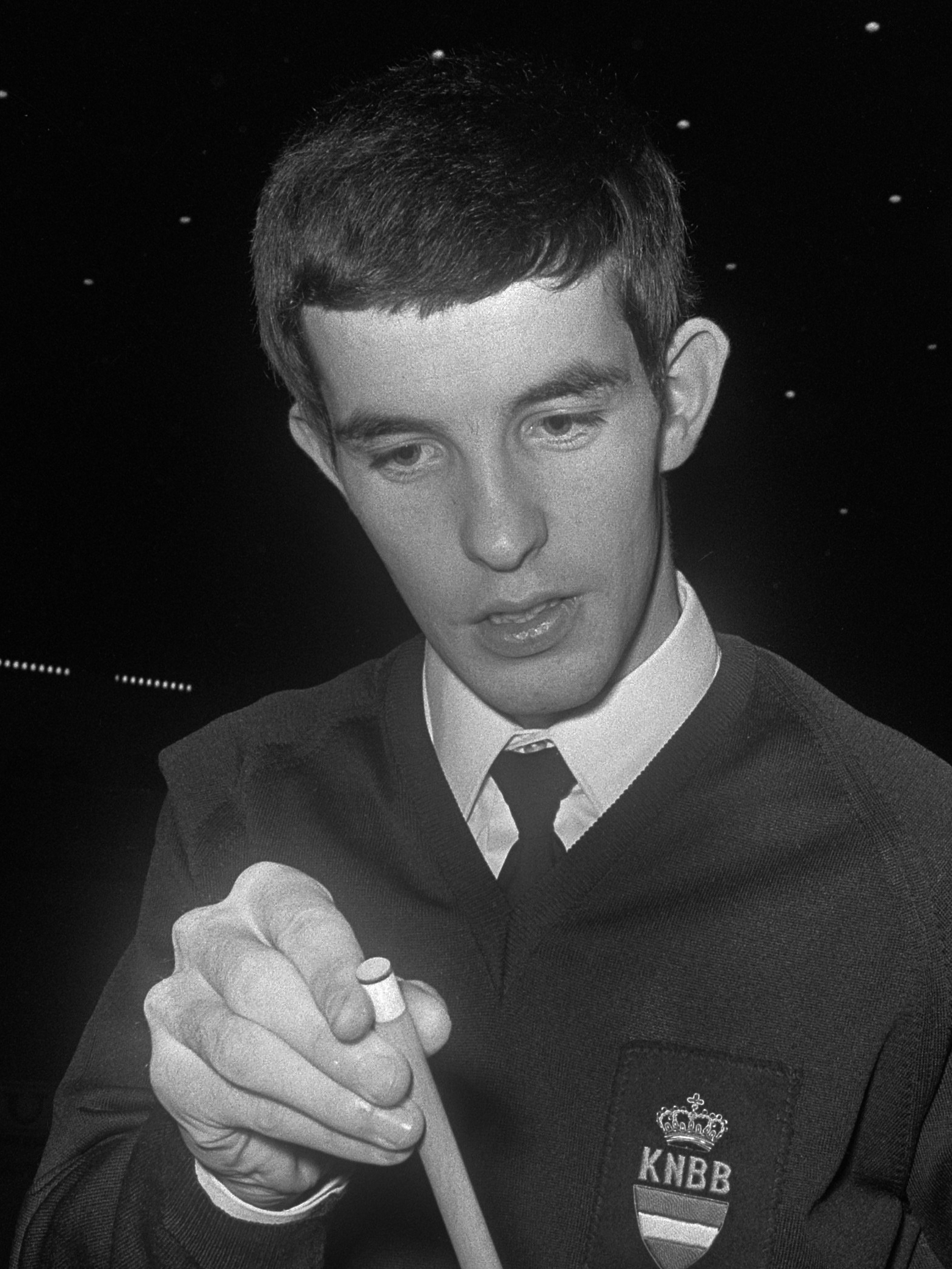
- Bessems in 1968

Personal information
- Born: 4 January 1945 (age 81) Cadier en Keer, Netherlands

Pool career
- Country: Netherlands

Tournament wins
- World Champion: Artistic Billiards World Championship (1985, 1988)

Jean Bessems (born 4 January 1945) is a Dutch former artistic and carom billiards player. He won the Artistic Billiards World Championship in 1985 and 1988, and finished as runner-up in 1984.

== Career ==
Bessems was born on January 4, 1945, in Cadier en Keer. His father was a farmer, pigeon breeder and later cafe owner. At age 14 he started playing billiards, and also played association football. At age 19, he stopped playing football and exclusively pursued billiards. He played first carom billiards, but later switched to artistic billiards, more commonly associated with trickshots.

Bessems made his international breakthrough in 1965 at the European Youth Billiards Championships. In the Cadre 47/2 European Championship 1971 in Nice, he won his first silver medal in the men's competition. He played against players such as Raymond Ceulemans, Henk Scholte, Hans Vultink, Francis Connesson and Emile Wafflard. He won the Artistic Billiards World Championship event both in 1985, held in Sluis in Zeeland and again in 1988 in Stockerau in Austria. Bessems was also a four time European Artistic Billiards champion, winning the event in 1986, 1987, 1988, and 1989. In 1991, he finished his sporting career and 2005 went into early retirement.

== Personal life ==
Bessems worked as a mechanical engineer. For twenty years, like his father, he was a pigeon breeder.

== Achievements ==
International

- Artistic Billiards World Championship:
  - winner: 1985, 1988
  - runner-up: 1984
  - third place: 1987
- Cadre-47/1 World Championship:
  - runner-up:1975
- Artistic Billiards European Championships:
  - winner: 1986, 1987, 1988, 1989
  - runner-up: 1985
  - third place: 1981, 1982, 1983
- Cadre-47/1 European Championships: (runner-up) 1975
- Cadre-47/2 European Championships: (runner-up) 1971
- Cadre-71/2 European Championships: (third place) 1974

National

- Dutch Artistic Championships
  - winner:1981, 1982, 1983, 1984, 1985, 1986, 1987, 1989
- Dutch Cadre Championships:
  - winner: 1 × 47/2, 1 × 47/1, 3 × 71/2
- Dutch Pentathlon Championships:
  - runner-up: 1973
  - third place: 1975
