= Mogan =

Mogan may refer to:

- Mogán, Las Palmas, municipality in Las Palmas, Spain
- Mount Mogan, mountain in Deqing County, Zhejiang Province, China
- Lake Mogan, a lake in Ankara Province, Turkey
