= Oyaca =

Oyaca may refer to:

- Oyaca, Gölbaşı
- Oyaca, Sungurlu
