= Mahmatlı =

Mahmatlı can refer to:

- Mahmatlı, Gölbaşı
- Mahmatlı, Sungurlu
- Mahmatlı, Vezirköprü
