= Günalan =

Günalan can refer to:

- Günalan, Burdur
- Günalan, Gölbaşı
- Günalan, Kocaköy
