= Gölbaşı International Billiards Complex =

Billiards complex in Ankara, Turkey

- Interactive map of Gölbaşı International Billiards Complex
- Location: Gölbaşı, Ankaral, Turkey
- Coordinates: 39.80281°N 32.80761°E
- Owner: Gölbaşı Municipality

Construction
- Groundbreaking: January 2021
- Opened: 15 November 2021; 4 years ago

Tenant
- Turkish Billiards Federation

Gölbaşı International Billiards Complex (Turkish: Gölbaşı Uluslararsı Bilardo Kompleksi) is a sport facility for billiards established in Gölbaşı, Ankara, Turkey in 2021. It is also the headquarters of the Turkish Billiards Federation.

The project for a billiards complex was worked out by the Turkish Billiards Federation in 2018. The construction began in January 2021 after the signing of a protocol between the district municipality of Gölbaşı, Ankara, the Billiards Federation and the Ministry of Youth and Sports. It was built by the district municipality, and officially opened on 15 November 2021. The complex serves as a venue for billiards competitions at national, European, and world level.

The complex consists of two buildings and a car parking lot. It has a total indoor area of 2,000 m^{2} (22,000 sq ft). The billiard hall building features separate entrance and exit areas for spectators and athletes, foyer, the tournament hall with spectator stands on both sides overlooking the entire hall, male and female athlete locker rooms, rest room for athletes before the match and during breaks, referee room, meeting room as well as cafeteria and kitchen.

== International competitions hosted ==
=== 2022 ===
- 21–27 February – Three-cushion World Cup 2022/1,

=== 2023 ===
- 20–23 July – WCB World Games,
- 6–10 September – World Championship 3-Cushion – Individual Men's competition,
- 15–18 September – World Junior Billiards Championship,
- 20–23 September – Artistic Billiards World Championship,

=== 2024 ===
- 6–8 March – European Championship Artistic,
- 16–17 April – European Championship 3-Cushion National Teams and Individual,
- 9–15 June – Three-cushion World Cup 2024/3,
- 19–22 June – Artistic Billiards World Championship,
