= Joaquín Domingo =

Spanish billiards player

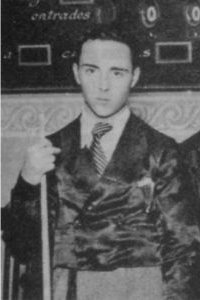

Personal information
- Nickname: Nano de Sants
- Born: 16 August 1917 Barcelona
- Died: 27 February 1981 (aged 63) Barcelona

Pool career
- Country: Spain

Tournament wins
- World Champion: (1957, 1963, 1966) Artistic billiards

Joaquín Domingo Sánchez (16 August 1917 – 27 February 1981) was a Spanish artistic and carom billiards player, who won multiple world and European championships. He won the Artistic Billiards World Championship on three occasions and the European Billiards Artistic Championship on a further three occasions. He won the European Balkline 71/2 Championship in 1949, the CEB European Three-cushion Championship in 1948 and the 1954 European Billiard Pentathlon Championship. He ended his career at the age of 58 with a bronze medal at the 1975 World Cup in Belgium. In total, Domingo was able to win 32 medals at world and European championships, plus 67 Spanish titles.
