= Gölbaşı, Ankara =

Gölbaşı
- District and municipality
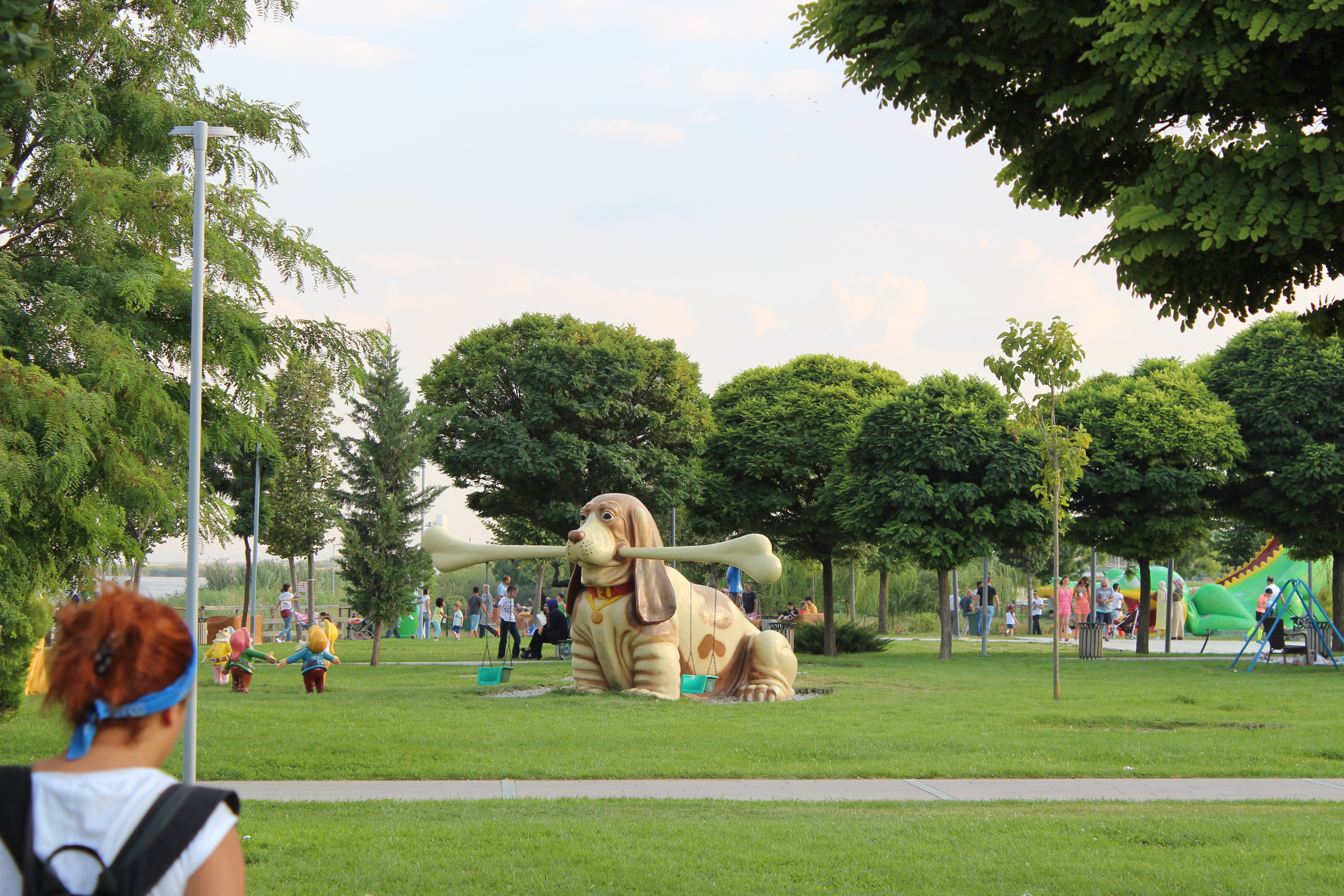
- Lake Mogan Park

- Logo

- Map showing Gölbaşı District in Ankara Province

- Location within Turkey Location within Turkey Central Anatolia
- Coordinates: 39°47′43″N 32°48′10″E
- Country: Turkey
- Province: Ankara

Government
  - Mayor: Yakup Odabaşı (CHP)
- Area: 1,364 km^{2} (527 sq mi)
- Elevation: 970 m (3,180 ft)
- Population (2022): 150,047
  - Density: 110.0/km^{2} (284.9/sq mi)
- Time zone: UTC+3 (TRT)
- Area code: 0312
- Website: www.ankaragolbasi.bel.tr

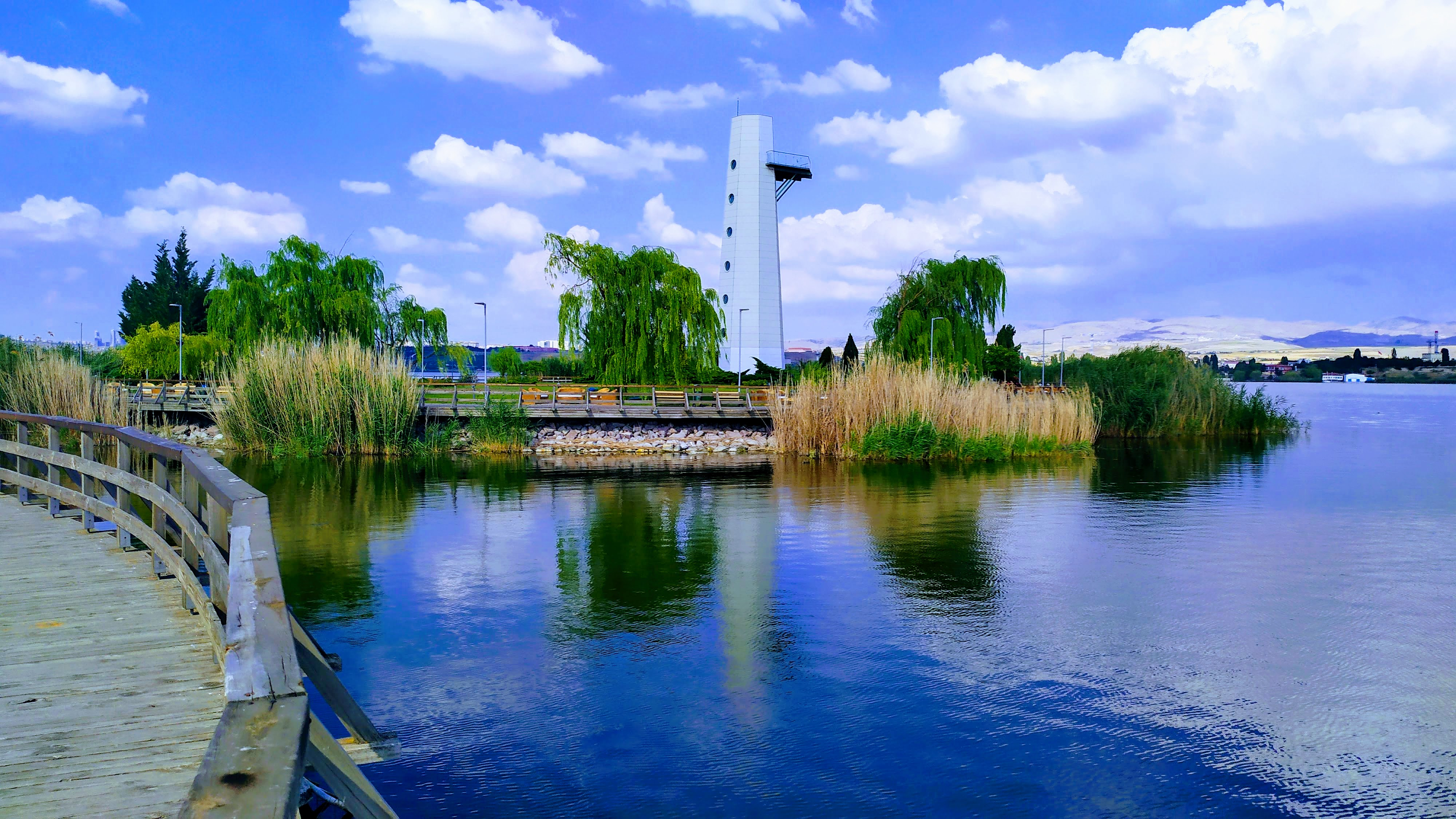
Lake Mogan

Gölbaşı (Turkish pronunciation: [ɟøl.ba.ʃɯ]; lit. 'Lakeside') is a municipality and district of Ankara Province, Turkey. Its area is 1,364 km^{2}, and its population is 150,047 (2022). It is 20 km (12 mi) south of the city of Ankara. Its elevation is 970 m (3,182 ft). The district includes the Mogan and Eymir lakes.

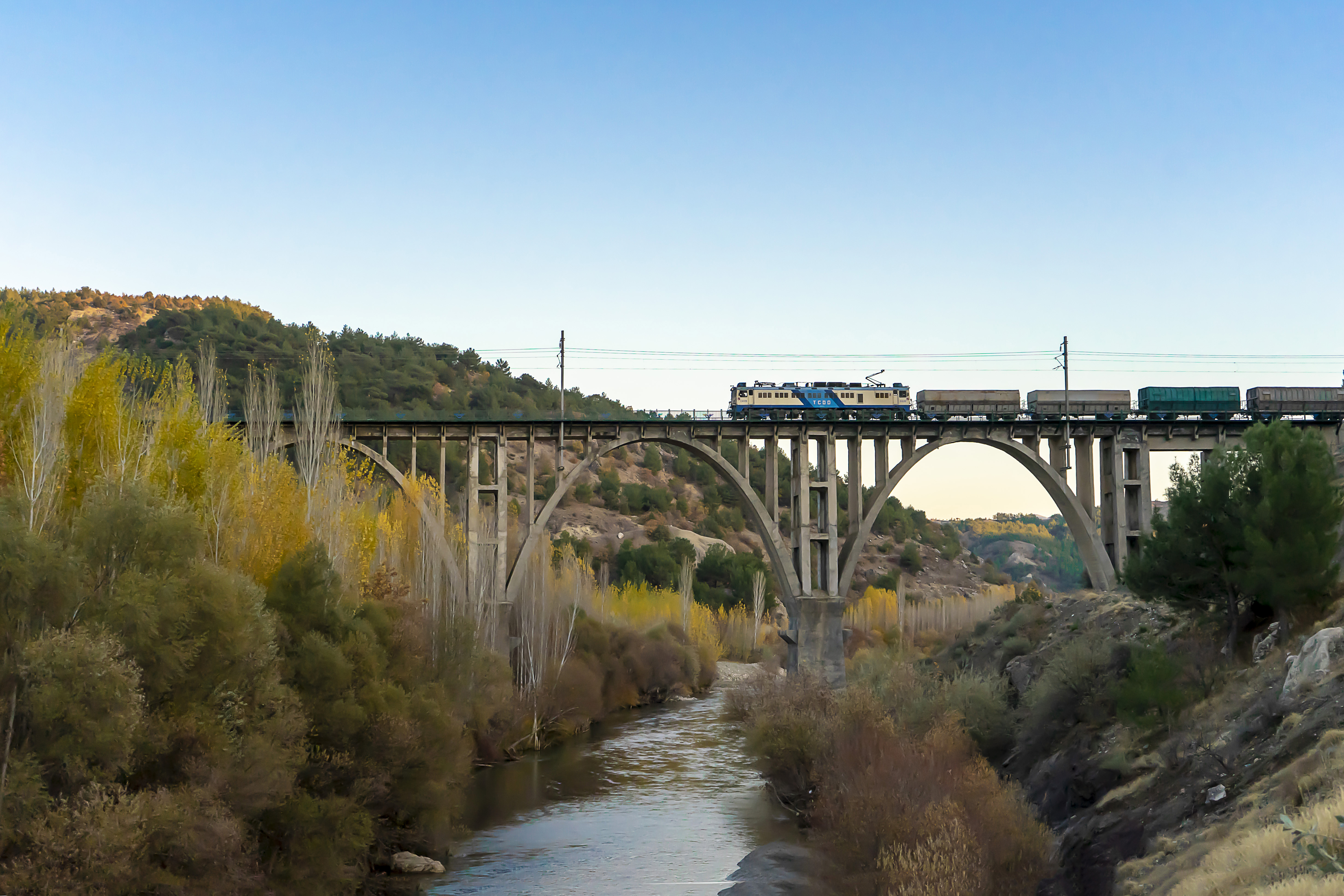
A train and bridge in Gölbaşı

Although the lakes are polluted and infested with mosquitoes, the picnic areas and lakeside restaurants of Gölbaşı serve as a popular retreat from the city for the people of Ankara. A number of government departments have accommodations here, and the town is slowly but surely joining up with the city as the green space between the two disappears. Türk Telekom have their satellite ground control in the area.

== Etymology ==
In Turkish, Gölbaşı literally means 'lakeside'. The district is situated on the shores of Lake Mogan and Lake Eymir, hence the name. Prior to 1923, the area (then a mahalle of Örencik) was known as Gölhanı, or 'Lake Inn'.

== History ==
Archaeological research in the area has revealed since 3000 BC a succession of civilısations including Hittites, Phrygians, Greeks, Romans, and Byzantines. Excavated sites include Selametli, Tuluntaş, Tuluntaş-Ortaçayır, Kızılcaşar-Gökçepınar, Karagedik, Bacılar, Bezirhane Kültepe, Bezirhane-Kepenekçi and İncek-Harmantepe.

The area has long been occupied by Turks, and it was here that Timur hid his elephants in the woods before the Battle of Ankara.

== Places of interest ==
- Tulumtaş caves - 15 km (9 mi) from Ankara, 5 km (3 mi) of limestone cave with stalagmites and stalactites
- Gölbaşı Ground Station, satellite telecommunication center of Türksat,
- Turkish Satellite Assembly, Integration and Test Center (Turkish: Uydu Montaj, Entegrasyon ve Test Merkezi) operated by the Turkish Aerospace Industries (TAI),
- Gölbaşı International Billiards Complex with the seay of the Turkish Billiards Federation.

== Demographics ==
Historical population
Year	Pop.	±% p.a.
1985	31,671	—
2000	62,602	+4.65%
2007	73,670	+2.35%
2012	110,643	+8.47%
2017	130,363	+3.33%
2022	150,047	+2.85%
Source: TÜIK (2007–2022)

The population of Gölbaşı city is growing very fast. The main reasons are: a high natural growth rate, migration from rural areas (rural exodus) and immigration from the city of Ankara.

== Composition ==
There are 54 neighbourhoods in Gölbaşı District:

- Ahiboz
- Akörençarşak
- Altunçanak
- Bağiçi
- Bahçelievler
- Ballıkpınar
- Bezirhane
- Boyalık
- Çayırlı
- Çeltek
- Çimşit
- Dikilitaş
- Emirler
- Eymir
- Gaziosmanpaşa
- Gökçehüyük
- Gölbek
- Günalan
- Hacıhasan
- Hacılar
- Hacımuratlı
- Halaçlı
- İkizce
- İncek
- Karaali Merkez
- Karaali Yazlık
- Karacaören
- Karagedik Aydın
- Karagedik Ercan
- Karaoğlan
- Karşıyaka
- Kırıklı
- Kızılcaşar
- Koparan
- Mahmatlı
- Mahmatlıbahçe
- Oğulbey
- Örencik
- Oyaca Akarsu
- Oyaca Yeşilçam
- Şafak
- Seğmenler
- Selametli Şehit Emrah
- Soğulcak
- Subaşı
- Taşpınar
- Tepeyurt
- Topaklı
- Tulumtaş
- Velihimmetli
- Yağlıpınar
- Yavrucuk
- Yaylabağ
- Yurtbeyi
