= Tepeyurt =

Tepeyurt (literally "hill homeland" in Turkish) may refer to the following places in Turkey:

- Tepeyurt, Arhavi, a village in the district of Arhavi, Artvin Province
- Tepeyurt, Gölbaşı, a neighborhood of the district of Gölbaşı, Ankara Province
