= Koparan =

Koparan can refer to:

- Koparan, Gölbaşı
- Koparan, Güney
