= Topaklı =

Topaklı may refer to the following places in Turkey:

- Topaklı, Gölbaşı, a neighborhood of the district of Gölbaşı, Ankara Province
- Topaklı, Tarsus, a village in the district of Tarsus, Mersin Province
