= Hacı Arap Yaman =

Turkish billiards player (born 1965)

Personal information
- Born: 4 April 1965 (age 61) Bismil, Diyarbakır, Turkey

Pool career
- Country: Turkey

Medal record

Men's artistic billiards

Representing Turkey

World Championship
Gold medal – first place	2024 Ankara	Individual
Bronze medal – third place	2012 Schelle	Individua
Silver medal – second place	2009 Kastamonu	Individua
Gold medal – first place	2008 Samsun	Individua

Grand Prix
Gold medal – first place	2022 Rosmalen	Individua

European Championship
Bronze medal – third place	2024 Ankara	Individua
Gold medal – first place	2023 Antalya	Individua

European Championship National Teams
Gold medal – first place	2024 Antalya	Team
Gold medal – first place	2023 Antalya	Team

Hacı Arap Yaman (born 4 April 1965) is a Turkish carom and artistic billiards player. He has champion titles at European and world level in artistic billiards.

== Personal life ==
Hacı Arap Yaman was born in Bismil district of Diyarbakır Province, Turkey on 4 April 1965. He completed his education in his hometown. During his school years, he was interested in different branches of sports.

== Sport career ==
Yaman settled in Ankara, when he started playing billiards professionally. In the first year of his career, he took the third place in the Turkish championships. The next year, he became champion of Ankara. Later, his success continued, and he was admitted to the national team. He is a member of the district municipality's billiards club in Yenişehir, Diyarbakır.

Yaman won the gold medal at the 2008 Artistic Billiards World Championship held in Schelle, Belgium defeating Xavier Fonellosa from Spain. The next year in Kastamonu, Turkey, he took the silver medal after losing the final match to Belgian Eric Daelman by 2–3. In 2012, he took the bronze medal at the same competition in Samsun, Turkey. Yaman captured the gold medal at the 2022 CEB Grand Prix Artistic in Rosmalen, Netherlands. He won the gold medal with his teammate Barış Çin at the 2023 European Championship Artistic National Teams in Antalya, Turkey defeating the Spanish team by 3–1. At the 2023 European Championship Artistic in Antalya, Turkey, he received the gold medal among 38 competitors winning over German Heinrich Marvin in five sets by 172–147. Yaman and his teammate Barış Çin defeated Erik Van den Zegel and Erik Vervliet from Belgium by 3–1 in the final of the 2024 European Championship Artistic National Teams in Antalya, Turkey, and won the gold medal. At the 2024 European Championship Artistic in Ankara, Turkey, he lost the semifinals match to Michael Hammen from France by 120–174, and took the bronze medal. He repeated his world champion title of the artistic billiards in Ankara, Turkey after 16 years in 2024 defeating his country+man[Barış Çin in the final.
