= Akören =

Akören (literally "white ruins" in Turkish) is a place name and may refer to:

- Akören, Alaca
- Akören, Aladağ, a village in Adana Province, Turkey
- Akören, Aşkale
- Akören, Çankırı
- Akören, Hınıs
- Akören, Kemer
- Akören, Konya, a town and district in Konya Province, Turkey
- Akören, Mengen, a village in Bolu Province, Turkey
- Akören, Merzifon, a village in Amasya Province, Turkey
- Akören, Osmancık
- Akören, Sinanpaşa, a village in Afyonkarahisar Province, Turkey
- Akören, Vezirköprü, a village in Samsun Province, Turkey

== See also ==
- Akörençarşak, Bala
- Akörensöküler, Ulus
