= Çimşit =

Çimşit may refer to the following places in Turkey:

- Çimşit, Gölbaşı, a village in the district of Gölbaşı, Ankara Province
- Çimşit, Kazan, a village and neighborhood in the district of Kazan, Ankara Province
