= Halaçlı, Gölbaşı =

Halaçlı
- Neighbourhood
- Location in Turkey Halaçlı (Turkey Central Anatolia)
- Coordinates: 39.7080°N 32.6054°E
- Country: Turkey
- Province: Ankara
- District: Gölbaşı
- Population (2022): 258
- Time zone: UTC+3 (TRT)

Halaçlı is a neighbourhood in the municipality and district of Gölbaşı, Ankara Province, Turkey. Its population is 258 (2022).
