= Altunçanak, Gölbaşı =

Altunçanak
- Neighbourhood
- Location in Turkey Altunçanak (Turkey Central Anatolia)
- Coordinates: 39.2643°N 32.9223°E
- Country: Turkey
- Province: Ankara
- District: Gölbaşı
- Population (2022): 90
- Time zone: UTC+3 (TRT)

Altunçanak (also: Altınçanak) is a neighbourhood in the District of Gölbaşı, Ankara Province, Turkey. Its population is 90 (2022). In 2008 it passed from the Bala District to the Gölbaşı District. Much of the population is Kurdish.
