= Karagedik Aydın, Gölbaşı =

Neighbourhood in Ankara, Turkey

Karagedik Aydın
- Neighbourhood
- Location in Turkey Karagedik Aydın (Turkey Central Anatolia)
- Coordinates: 39°34′41″N 32°47′59″E
- Country: Turkey
- Province: Ankara
- District: Gölbaşı
- Population (2022): 1,247
- Time zone: UTC+3 (TRT)

Karagedik Aydın is a neighbourhood in the municipality and district of Gölbaşı, Ankara Province, Turkey. Its population is 1,247 (2022). Karagedik was an independent municipality until it was merged into the municipality of Gölbaşı in 2008. The village is populated by Kurds.
