= Velihimmetli, Gölbaşı =

Velihimmetli
- Neighbourhood
- Location in Turkey Velihimmetli (Turkey Central Anatolia)
- Coordinates: 39°41′26″N 32°39′19″E
- Country: Turkey
- Province: Ankara
- District: Gölbaşı
- Population (2022): 586
- Time zone: UTC+3 (TRT)

Velihimmetli is a neighbourhood in the municipality and district of Gölbaşı, Ankara Province, Turkey. Its population is 586 (2022).
