= Dikilitaş, Gölbaşı =

Dikilitaş
- Neighbourhood
- Country: Turkey
- Province: Ankara
- District: Gölbaşı
- Population (2022): 457
- Time zone: UTC+3 (TRT)

Dikilitaş is a neighbourhood in the municipality and district of Gölbaşı, Ankara Province, Turkey. Its population is 457 (2022).
