= Oğulbey, Gölbaşı =

Oğulbey
- Neighbourhood
- Location in Turkey Oğulbey (Turkey Central Anatolia)
- Coordinates: 39.6867°N 32.8264°E
- Country: Turkey
- Province: Ankara
- District: Gölbaşı
- Population (2022): 1,104
- Time zone: UTC+3 (TRT)

Oğulbey is a neighbourhood in the municipality and district of Gölbaşı, Ankara Province, Turkey. Its population is 1,104 (2022).
