= Selametli Şehit Emrah =

- Neighbourhood
- Location in Turkey Selametli Şehit Emrah (Turkey Central Anatolia)
- Coordinates: 39.4861°N 32.8086°E
- Country: Turkey
- Province: Ankara
- District: Gölbaşı
- Population (2022): 795
- Time zone: UTC+3 (TRT)

Selametli Şehit Emrah is a neighbourhood in the municipality and district of Gölbaşı, Ankara Province, Turkey. Its population is 795 (2022). Selametli was an independent municipality until it was merged into the municipality of Gölbaşı in 2008.
