= Hacıhasan, Gölbaşı =

Hacıhasan
- Neighbourhood
- Location in Turkey Hacıhasan (Turkey Central Anatolia)
- Coordinates: 39.74702°N 32.74977°E
- Country: Turkey
- Province: Ankara
- District: Gölbaşı
- Population (2022): 584
- Time zone: UTC+3 (TRT)

Hacıhasan is a neighbourhood in the municipality and district of Gölbaşı, Ankara Province, Turkey. Its population is 584 (2022).
