= Hacımuratlı, Gölbaşı =

Hacımuratlı
- Neighbourhood
- Location in Turkey Hacımuratlı (Turkey Central Anatolia)
- Coordinates: 39°41′N 32°42′E
- Country: Turkey
- Province: Ankara
- District: Gölbaşı
- Population (2022): 322
- Time zone: UTC+3 (TRT)

Hacımuratlı is a neighbourhood in the municipality and district of Gölbaşı, Ankara Province, Turkey. Its population is 322 (2022).
