= Artistic Billiards World Championship =

Carom billiards competition

The Artistic Billiards World Championship is a carom billiards tournament in the discipline of artistic billiards, organized by the Confédération International de Billard Artistique.

Raymond Steylaerts of Belgium won the tournament six times, more than any other player.

== List of champions ==
The winners have mainly been European, and more commonly Belgian.

Year	Location	Gold	Silver	Bronze
1937	(France) Paris	(Germany) August Tiedtke	(France) Richard Kron	(Belgium) René Vingerhoedt
1939	(France) Marseille	(Belgium) René Vingerhoedt	(Belgium) M. van de Kerckhove	(France) Richard Kron
1957	(Spain) Murcia	(Spain) Joaquín Domingo	(France) Roger de Becker	(Spain) Francisco Munte
1963	(France) Lyon	(Spain) Joaquín Domingo	(Belgium) Raymond Steylaerts	(Spain) Francisco Munte
1966	(Spain) Madrid	(Spain) Joaquín Domingo	(Argentina) Carlos Tosi	(Belgium) Raymond Steylaerts
1970	(Argentina) La Plata	(Belgium) Raymond Steylaerts	(Argentina) Carlos Tosi	(Spain) Ricardo Fernández
1972	(Belgium) Deurne	(Belgium) Léo Corin	(Spain) Claudio Nadal	(Belgium) Raymond Steylaerts
1973	(France) Lyon	(Belgium) Léo Corin	(Spain) Ricardo Fernández	(Belgium) Raymond Steylaerts
1974	(Belgium) Sint-Niklaas	(Spain) Ricardo Fernández	(Belgium) Florent de Jonghe	(Belgium) Léo Corin
1975	(Belgium) Mol	(Belgium) Léo Corin	(Spain) Valentín Almerich	(Spain) Joaquín Domingo
1979	(Netherlands) Den Haag	(Belgium) Raymond Steylaerts	(Spain) Ricardo Fernández	(Belgium) Léo Corin
1980	(France) Maubeuge	(Belgium) Raymond Steylaerts	(Belgium) Léo Corin	(Netherlands) Cees van Oosterhout
1983	(France) Paris	(Belgium) Léo Corin	(Spain) Ricardo Fernández	(Mexico) Roberto Rojas
1984	(Netherlands) Heeswijk-Dinther	(Belgium) Raymond Steylaerts	(Netherlands) Jean Bessems	(Belgium) Léo Corin
1985	(Netherlands) Sluis	(Netherlands) Jean Bessems	(France) Francis Connesson	(France) Maurice Coyret
1986	(Mexico) Acapulco	(Belgium) Raymond Steylaerts	(Japan) Tadashi Mashida	(Netherlands) Frans Belderbos
1987	(Germany) Mönchengladbach	(Belgium) Raymond Steylaerts	(France) Jean Reverchon	(Netherlands) Jean Bessems
1988	(Austria) Stockerau	(Netherlands) Jean Bessems	(Belgium) Léo Corin	(Netherlands) Jan Brunnekreef
1990	(Spain) Barcelona	(France) Jean Reverchon	(Mexico) Roberto Rojas	(Spain) Xavier Fonellosa
1991	(Germany) Bad Bergzabern	(Netherlands) Frans Belderbos	(France) Madou Touré	(Austria) Andreas Horvath
1992	(France) Épernay	(France) Jean Reverchon	(Spain) Xavier Fonellosa	(Austria) Andreas Horvath
1993	(Netherlands) Grubbenvorst	(Spain) Xavier Fonellosa	(Germany) Thomas Ahrens	(France) Jean Reverchon
1995	(Spain) Zaragoza	(Spain) Xavier Fonellosa	(France) Jean Reverchon	(Belgium) Raymond Steylaerts
1996	(France) Pithiviers	(France) Jean Reverchon	(Spain) Xavier Fonellosa	(Netherlands) Ger Holka
2002	(France) Faches-Thumesnil	(Mexico) Roberto Rojas	(Germany) Thomas Ahrens	(Spain) Xavier Fonellosa
2002	(France) Faches-Thumesnil	(Mexico) Roberto Rojas	(Germany) Thomas Ahrens	(Spain) Jaume Norberto
2006	(Netherlands) Amsterdam	(Netherlands) Sander Jonen	(Belgium) Walter Bax	(France) Madou Touré
2006	(Netherlands) Amsterdam	(Netherlands) Sander Jonen	(Belgium) Walter Bax	(Germany) Thomas Ahrens
2008	(Belgium) Schelle	(Turkey) Hacı Arap Yaman	(Spain) Xavier Fonellosa	(Netherlands) Ruud de Vos
2008	(Belgium) Schelle	(Turkey) Hacı Arap Yaman	(Spain) Xavier Fonellosa	(Turkey) Serdar Gümüş
2009	(Turkey) Kastamonu	(Belgium) Eric Daelman	(Turkey) Hacı Arap Yaman	(Belgium) Walter Bax
2009	(Turkey) Kastamonu	(Belgium) Eric Daelman	(Turkey) Hacı Arap Yaman	(Netherlands) Martin van Rhee
2011	(France) Florange	(Netherlands) Sander Jonen	(Germany) Bernd Singer	(Japan) Nobuyasu Sakai
2011	(France) Florange	(Netherlands) Sander Jonen	(Germany) Bernd Singer	(Belgium) Walter Bax
2012	(Turkey) Samsun	(Turkey) Serdar Gümüş	(Netherlands) Erik Vijverberg	(Turkey) Hacı Arap Yaman
2012	(Turkey) Samsun	(Turkey) Serdar Gümüş	(Netherlands) Erik Vijverberg	(Belgium) Eric Daelman
2023	(Turkey) Ankara	(Mexico) David González	(France) Kevin Tran	(Turkey) Barış Çin
2023	(Turkey) Ankara	(Mexico) David González	(France) Kevin Tran	(Germany) Thomas Ahrens
2024	(Turkey) Ankara	(Turkey) Hacı Arap Yaman	(Turkey) Barış Çin	(Turkey) Serdar Gümüş
2024	(Turkey) Ankara	(Turkey) Hacı Arap Yaman	(Turkey) Barış Çin	(Spain) Héctor Cuadrado
2025	(Turkey) Ankara	(Netherlands) René Dericks	(Belgium) Erik Vervliet	(France) Michael Hammen
2025	(Turkey) Ankara	(Netherlands) René Dericks	(Belgium) Erik Vervliet	(Belgium) Steve Wilms
2026	(Turkey) Ankara	(Netherlands) Benny Smits	(France) Kevin Tran	(Netherlands) Jop de Jong
2026	(Turkey) Ankara	(Netherlands) Benny Smits	(France) Kevin Tran	(Turkey) Serdar Gümüş
