= Boyalık, Gölbaşı =

Boyalık
- Neighbourhood
- Location in Turkey Boyalık (Turkey Central Anatolia)
- Coordinates: 39.4745°N 32.6674°E
- Country: Turkey
- Province: Ankara
- District: Gölbaşı
- Population (2022): 342
- Time zone: UTC+3 (TRT)

Boyalık is a neighbourhood in the municipality and district of Gölbaşı, Ankara Province, Turkey. Its population is 342 (2022).
