= Kırıklı, Gölbaşı =

Kırıklı
- Neighbourhood
- Location in Turkey Kırıklı (Turkey Central Anatolia)
- Coordinates: 39.5307°N 32.8044°E
- Country: Turkey
- Province: Ankara
- District: Gölbaşı
- Population (2022): 102
- Time zone: UTC+3 (TRT)

Kırıklı is a neighbourhood in the municipality and district of Gölbaşı, Ankara Province, Turkey. Its population is 102 (2022).
