= Mustafa Kemal Kurdaş =

Turkish economist and politician

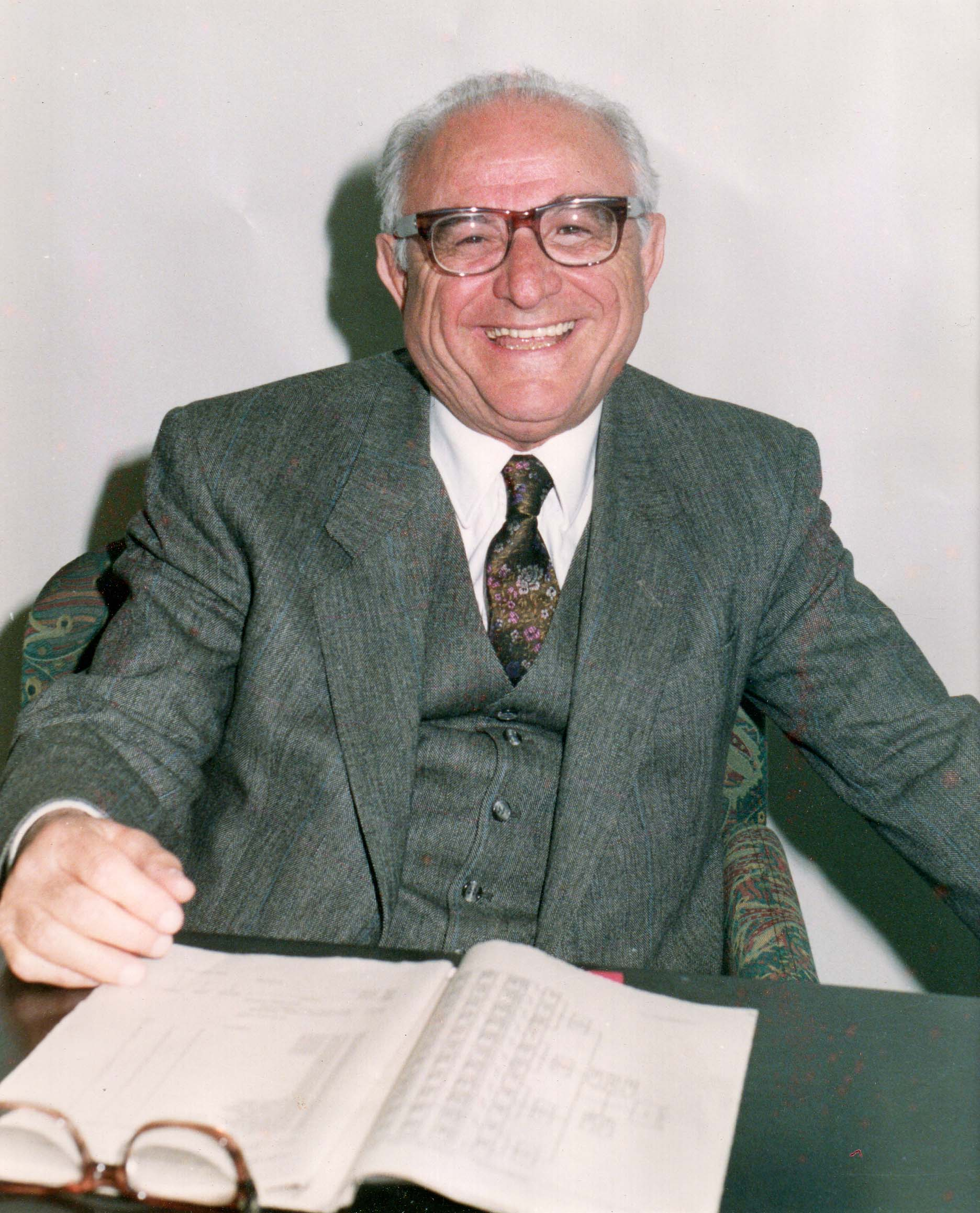
- Born: 1920; Bursa, Ottoman Empire
- Died: 19 April 2011 (aged 90–91)
- Education: Faculty of Political Science, Ankara University
- Parents: Şevki Kadri (father); Sıdıka (mother)

Mustafa Kemal Kurdaş (1920 – 19 April 2011) was a Turkish economist who served as Turkish Minister of Finance, the IMF’s adviser to Latin American governments, president of the Middle East Technical University and deputy head of the Turkish Treasury.

He is best remembered for his work to develop Middle East Technical University (Turkish: Orta Doğu Teknik Üniversitesi, ODTÜ), build a distinctive campus for it and create a forest in what was arid, eroding land. He helped found and expand a number of businesses. At the same time, he initiated archeological excavations, led the effort to salvage historical artifacts and monuments from flooding by the Keban Dam and supported the publication of findings that throw light on the Neolithic revolution. On the side, he wrote articles and books on economic policy.

His interests span archeology, architecture, business, economics, education and forestry. Kurdaş not only pursued these diverse interests but made a contribution in each area.

== Early life ==
Kemal Kurdaş was born in Bursa, Turkey, to parents who were descendants of Turkish settlers and native Albanians in North Macedonia. His ancestors, who arrived in the Balkans with the Ottoman armies several centuries earlier, established themselves in farming and trade. Despite living among a predominantly Christian population, they retained a distinct cultural identity, though they were more Westernized than the Turks remaining in Anatolia.

In 1912, amid the upheavals of the Balkan Wars, Kemal's parents fled to Anatolia, leaving behind their property and livelihoods. They settled in Bursa, where Kemal was later born. Throughout his life, despite extensive travels and periods living on different continents, Kurdaş maintained a deep affection for Bursa, drawn to its historical bridges and the vistas of Uludağ, known in ancient times as Olympos.

During the decline of the Ottoman Empire following World War I, with Istanbul and parts of Anatolia under foreign occupation, Kemal's father, Şevki Kadri, joined the nationalist forces led by Mustafa Kemal Atatürk. Şevki Kadri was involved in organizing local militias but was captured by Greek forces and spent over three years as a prisoner of war in Greece. Kemal, named after Mustafa Kemal Atatürk, was just an infant during his father's imprisonment and was four years old upon his return. His father, significantly aged by his experiences, struggled to reintegrate and support his family.

Şevki Kadri later started a small business producing rakı and wine from local grapes. However, his enterprise was short-lived as the newly established Turkish Republic imposed a government monopoly on alcoholic beverages, which led to the confiscation of his equipment. In poor health and unable to sustain his livelihood, Şevki Kadri appealed to the government for the education of his children.

As the son of a war veteran, Kemal was granted admission to a state boarding school at the age of seven, where he remained through high school and college, rarely visiting his family. Despite the distance, the familial bond remained strong. Kemal often credited his father's patriotism and entrepreneurial spirit as key influences in his life, alongside his namesake, Mustafa Kemal Atatürk, whom he believed had selected him for a state-funded education based on a photograph from his youth.

== Early career ==
Kemal Kurdaş pursued his higher education at the Faculty of Political Science, Ankara University, where he spent considerable time in the library honing his English reading skills. This self-directed study inadvertently led him to explore contemporary economic theories, notably encountering the works of John Maynard Keynes at a foreign-language bookstore in Istanbul. Through these books, Kurdaş self-taught Keynesian economics, likely becoming one of the first Turkish civil servants to grasp these concepts.

During his tenure as an auditor at the Ministry of Finance, Kurdaş was recognized for his integrity, maintaining honesty in his audits despite facing pressures to ignore discrepancies. His professional path saw him travel frequently, reviewing tax and expenditure accounts of local government offices across various provinces and towns.

Kurdaş's personal life flourished when he met Ayfer, a woman with a keen interest in art and decoration, in Istanbul. Their marriage spanned six decades and produced three children, enduring until Kurdaş's death.

Professionally, in 1951, Kurdaş was assigned to the Turkish Embassy in London for a year, where he seized the opportunity to attend classes at the London School of Economics. Upon returning to Turkey, he rapidly ascended the ranks, becoming the deputy head of the Treasury at the age of 33. His tenure coincided with a turbulent period marked by a looming financial crisis, following a change in government in 1950 which aimed to dismantle statist policies and liberalize the economy.

The new government's economic strategies, particularly the removal of longstanding import controls and maintaining an overvalued Turkish lira, led to a severe depletion of Turkey's foreign currency reserves. Kurdaş advocated for aligning the official lira exchange rate with the market rate, arguing that a lower valuation would bolster exports and correct the trade imbalance. However, Prime Minister Adnan Menderes opposed this policy, fearing the political repercussions of currency devaluation. Instead, Menderes opted to sustain the trade deficits through foreign loans and aid, which exacerbated the country's debt and facilitated a system of crony capitalism and widespread corruption.

Kurdaş's persistent recommendations for currency devaluation were ignored, and his critiques of government policies made him unpopular among the political elite. Disillusioned by the government's economic management and the social repercussions of its policies, including state-sanctioned looting that targeted minority communities, Kurdaş's dissent grew. His stance eventually led to conflict with Prime Minister Menderes, resulting in increased government surveillance and restrictions on his movements.

Despite these challenges, Kurdaş's expertise was recognized internationally during IMF loan negotiations, leading to an offer to join the agency. However, his attempts to accept this position were thwarted by the government. With the assistance of a broad network of friends and former schoolmates, many of whom held significant governmental positions, Kurdaş was eventually able to secure a passport and leave Turkey for Europe.

== Minister of finance ==
In 1956, Kemal Kurdaş left Turkey amidst a challenging political climate. He found a supportive environment at the International Monetary Fund (IMF), where he was appointed as an advisor to Paraguay in 1958. This role was part of his broader engagement with Latin America, where he analyzed economic issues and offered recommendations.

The military coup in Turkey in 1960, which led to changes in government, prompted an invitation for Kurdaş to return and serve as the Minister of Finance. He accepted the role, motivated by a sense of patriotic duty, despite his and his wife Ayfer's initial preference to remain in America.

Upon his return, Kurdaş implemented significant reforms aimed at stabilizing the economy. He ended large subsidies to state-owned enterprises and enforced tax laws more strictly. His efforts to devalue the Turkish lira resulted in a policy applicable only to foreign currency purchases for travel, which was debated in parliament.

Kurdaş's contributions to economic discourse include several books and articles, such as Science and Common Sense in Economic Policy (1979), Analyses and Comments on Economic Policy (1994), and Endless Error: Collapse of the Turkish Economy (2003). These works discuss the impact of economic policies like inflation and currency valuation on developing economies.

Despite the turbulent political landscape, Kurdaş opposed the death sentences issued to the former government officials after the 1960 coup, advocating for a more humane approach to political justice. His diplomatic efforts, however, did not change the outcome.

Remaining politically unaffiliated, Kurdaş maintained relationships across various political groups, including with notable leaders İsmet İnönü and Süleyman Demirel. He left the government with a belief that he had contributed positively to the country's economic stability.

His subsequent role as president of the Middle East Technical University in Ankara was driven by his commitment to educational excellence, aiming to solve Turkey's challenges through academic advancement.

== Rectorship at Middle East Technical University ==
Middle East Technical University (METU) was founded in 1956 as an institute dedicated to training engineers, architects, and other professionals to support Turkey's economic development. Initially small and housed in temporary buildings near Ankara's parliamentary complex, the university was given a large tract of land about 40 kilometers outside the city, although early attempts to develop this site were unsuccessful.

The allocated land, featuring Lake Eymir and largely barren hills, was part of an area historically covered by forests in the 15th century before human activity led to deforestation and erosion. Inspired by Atatürk's efforts to re-green Ankara, Kemal Kurdaş, upon becoming president of METU in the 1960s, was determined to transform this arid landscape. During an early visit to the site in 1961, the sight of a solitary tree motivated him to initiate extensive tree-planting initiatives. With limited resources, Kurdaş successfully garnered financial support, particularly from American sources, and instituted annual tree-planting days involving thousands of volunteers. The Ministry of Forestry eventually supported these efforts, contributing to the planting of approximately one million trees annually.

The architectural design of the new campus was awarded to young Turkish architects Behruz Çinici and his wife Altuğ following a competition. Their modernist design, which integrated local architectural themes with contemporary materials and layouts, initially faced resistance. Notable features of the design included pedestrian paths reminiscent of traditional Turkish town streets and modernist concrete buildings influenced by Ottoman and Anatolian village styles. The Çinici’s design approach later earned significant acclaim, contributing to Behruz Çinici’s reputation in the field.

Throughout his presidency, Kurdaş fostered an open-minded and tolerant atmosphere at the university. He remained committed to campus development, successfully transforming the landscape into a forested area and establishing METU as a leading institution for education and research. The 1960s saw increasing left-wing activism among students, leading to tensions over Kurdaş's collaborations with American officials and donors. In January 1969, an incident involving the burning of American ambassador Robert Komer's car by students led to the university's closure for a month, and Kurdaş left his position later that year.

Kurdaş, alongside Çinici and Alattin Egemen, director of reforestation, was recognized in 1995 with the Aga Khan Award for Architecture. The award highlighted their successful forestation of the 11,100-acre campus and the innovative design of the university's facilities. By that time, more than 12 million trees had been planted, making METU the largest green area around Ankara and significantly contributing to the reduction of the city's dryness and pollution.

== Later life ==
After leaving Middle East Technical University, Kemal Kurdaş transitioned to the business sector, where he served as an executive or board member for various companies over the next 25 years, contributing to the start of several pioneering businesses in Turkish industry. Alongside his business career, Kurdaş continued to cultivate his interests in economics and history, a passion that dated back to his childhood observations of historic structures in Bursa and Istanbul.

In 1961, while visiting Yalıncak village on METU land, Kurdaş noted the use of ancient stones in the construction of local houses. This observation led to archaeological investigations around the campus. Along with Aptullah Kuran, dean of METU's faculty of architecture, Kurdaş initiated excavations in Yalıncak, revealing continuous habitation since the late Phrygian period. The significant number of artifacts discovered prompted the establishment of a museum on the campus to accommodate them, with Kurdaş contributing a preface to the published findings.

Convinced of Anatolia's crucial role in the history of civilization, Kurdaş played a key role in other archaeological endeavors. One such project was the Keban Dam salvage operation, initiated to rescue artifacts from areas destined to be submerged by the dam's construction on the Euphrates River. This initiative began with a meeting at METU that included Turkish archaeologist Halet Çambel, then head of the Prehistory Department at Istanbul University. With support from then Prime Minister Süleyman Demirel, the project received government funding, supplemented by public contributions and international aid. Despite time constraints due to imminent flooding, a team of Turkish, American, and Dutch archaeologists managed to conduct significant excavations.

The ongoing construction of dams along the Euphrates continued to challenge archaeologists, who extended their salvage operations throughout the region historically known as Isuwa by the Hittites, uncovering settlements dating back to the Paleolithic era.

In his later years, Kurdaş was particularly intrigued by excavations at Göbekli Tepe, believed to be a site of a Neolithic temple predating Stonehenge by around 6,000 years. The discoveries at Göbekli Tepe, led by archaeologist Klaus Schmidt, suggested that temple construction might have precipitated the development of complex agricultural societies—a theory that reverses previous archaeological assumptions.

Kurdaş's commitment to promoting these historical insights extended to his plans to fund a series of books in English about the Neolithic findings in Turkey, to assert Anatolia's place as a cradle of civilization. His efforts were posthumously acknowledged in the dedication of the first book in this series.

A memorial guestbook by METU highlighted Kurdaş's significant impact on Turkish archaeology, noted for leading projects that shifted academic paradigms. In a memorial speech, his son Osman Kurdaş encapsulated his father's diverse legacy, which included impactful policy publications, the fostering of a top-tier university, environmental contributions through extensive forestation, support of Turkish industry, the curation of significant archaeological exhibits, and the cultivation of an ethos of tolerance and open-mindedness.

Political offices
Preceded by Ekrem Alican	Minister of Finance of Turkey; December 26, 1960 - November 20, 1961	Succeeded by Osman Şefik İnan
