= Bezirhane, Gölbaşı =

Bezirhane
- Neighbourhood
- Location in Turkey Bezirhane (Turkey Central Anatolia)
- Coordinates: 39.4805°N 32.8513°E
- Country: Turkey
- Province: Ankara
- District: Gölbaşı
- Population (2022): 598
- Time zone: UTC+3 (TRT)

Bezirhane is a neighbourhood in the municipality and district of Gölbaşı, Ankara Province, Turkey. Its population is 598 (2022). It was an independent municipality until it was merged into the municipality of Gölbaşı in 2008.
