= Kızılcaşar, Gölbaşı =

Kızılcaşar
- Neighbourhood
- Location in Turkey Kızılcaşar (Turkey Central Anatolia)
- Coordinates: 39°49′N 32°44′E
- Country: Turkey
- Province: Ankara
- District: Gölbaşı
- Population (2022): 8,581
- Time zone: UTC+3 (TRT)

Kızılcaşar is a neighbourhood in the municipality and district of Gölbaşı, Ankara Province, Turkey. Its population is 8,581 (2022).
