= Mahmatlıbahçe, Gölbaşı =

Mahmatlıbahçe
- Neighbourhood
- Location in Turkey Mahmatlıbahçe (Turkey Central Anatolia)
- Coordinates: 39°32′N 32°50′E
- Country: Turkey
- Province: Ankara
- District: Gölbaşı
- Population (2022): 127
- Time zone: UTC+3 (TRT)

Mahmatlıbahçe is a neighbourhood in the municipality and district of Gölbaşı, Ankara Province, Turkey. Its population is 127 (2022).
