= Gökçehüyük, Gölbaşı =

Gökçehüyük
- Neighbourhood
- Location in Turkey Gökçehüyük (Turkey Central Anatolia)
- Coordinates: 39°39′54″N 32°43′55″E
- Country: Turkey
- Province: Ankara
- District: Gölbaşı
- Population (2022): 878
- Time zone: UTC+3 (TRT)

Gökçehüyük is a neighbourhood in the municipality and district of Gölbaşı, Ankara Province, Turkey. Its population is 878 (2022).
