= Çeltek, Gölbaşı =

Coordinates: 39.2804°N 32.8652°E

Çeltek
- Neighbourhood
- Location in Turkey Çeltek (Turkey Central Anatolia)
- Coordinates
- Country: Turkey
- Province: Ankara
- District: Gölbaşı
- Population (2022): 76
- Time zone: UTC+3 (TRT)

Çeltek is a neighbourhood in the municipality and district of Gölbaşı, Ankara Province, Turkey. Its population is 76 (2022). It is 117 km (73 mi) from Ankara and 43 km (27 mi) from Haymana.
