= Karacaören, Gölbaşı =

Karacaören
- Neighbourhood
- Location in Turkey Karacaören (Turkey Central Anatolia)
- Coordinates: 39°21′44″N 32°48′50″E
- Country: Turkey
- Province: Ankara
- District: Gölbaşı
- Population (2022): 265
- Time zone: UTC+3 (TRT)

Karacaören is a neighbourhood in the municipality and district of Gölbaşı, Ankara Province, Turkey. Its population is 265 (2022).
