= Lake Eymir =

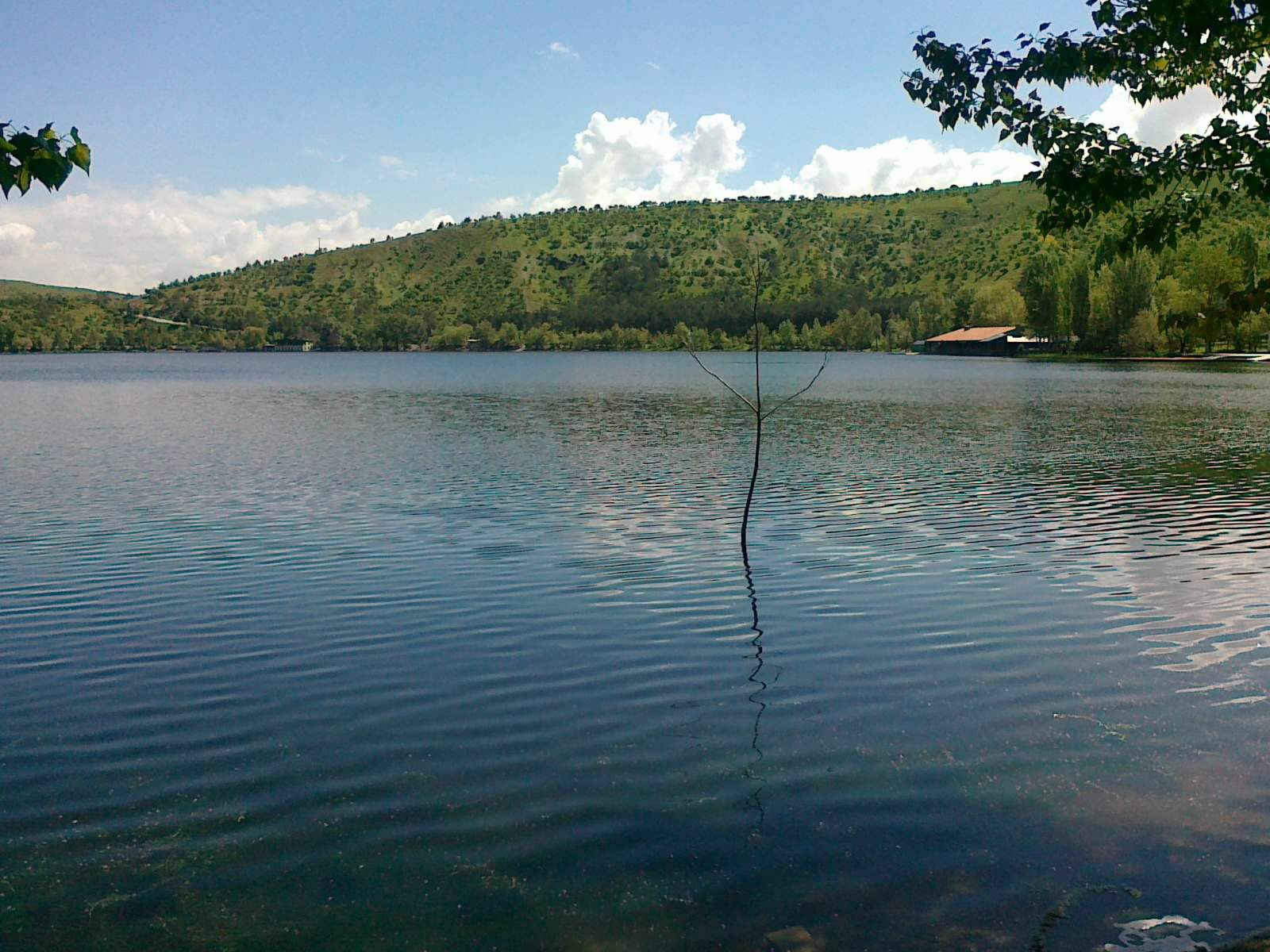

- Location within Turkey
- Location: Ankara Province, Turkey
- Coordinates: 39°49′27.22″N 32°49′43.91″E
- Type: Lake
- Max. length: 4.2 kilometres (2.6 mi)
- Max. width: 250 metres (820 ft)
- Surface area: 108.8 hectares (1.088 km^{2})
- Average depth: 3.80 metres (12.5 ft)
- Max. depth: 5.00 metres (16.40 ft)
- Shore length^{1}: 9 kilometres (5.6 mi)
- ^{1} Shore length is not a well-defined measure.

Lake Eymir is a small lake in Ankara Province, Turkey. According to notes of Seyyah Kandemir published by the governorate of Ankara in 1932, the lake was named after a Turkmen tribe named Eymür.

== Geography ==
The lake is about 20 kilometres (12 mi) south of the Ankara city center within the secondary municipality of Gölbaşı. The southern shore lies along the ring road O.20 of Ankara. The altitude of the water surface with respect to sea level is about 969 metres (3,179 ft). The shape of the lake roughly resembles the letter S.

The lake has a surface area of 108.8 hectares (1.088 km^{2}). The length of the lake is approximately 4.2 kilometres (2.6 mi), the average width is about 250 metres (820 ft). and the circumferential length is about 9 kilometres (5.6 mi). The deepest point is at −5.5 metres (−18 ft) (dry season) with an average depth of the lake at 3.80 metres (12.5 ft) (dry season) and 5.00 metres (16.40 ft) (wet season).

== Geology ==
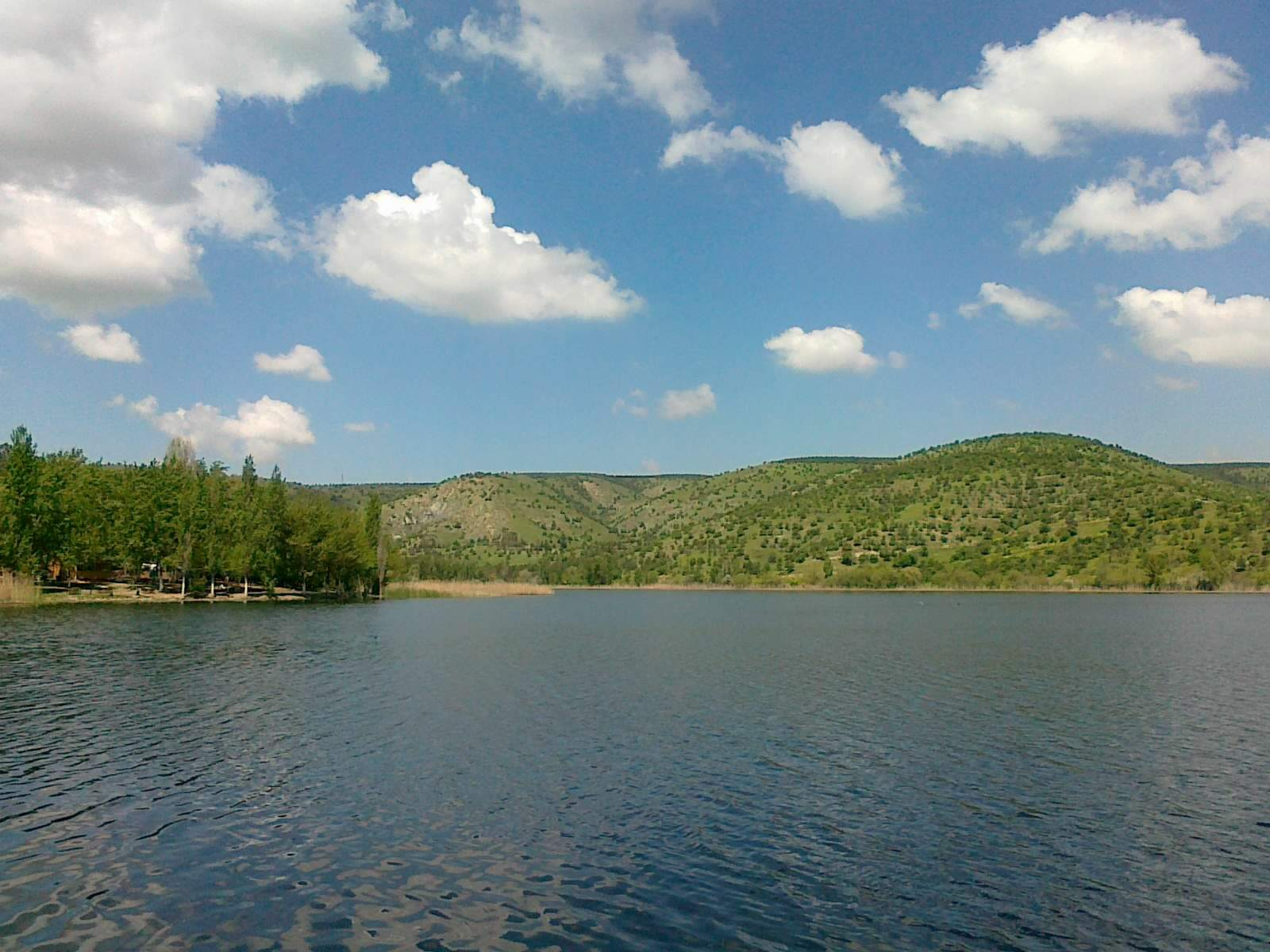

The lake is an alluvial set lake. The main water input is a channel from the nearby Lake Mogan, some 3 kilometres (1.9 mi) at the south west. When the level of Lake Eymir increases beyond a certain level, the extra water is discharged to the River İmrahor. During the flood in 1910, Lake Mogan and Lake Eymir temporarily merged.

== Near history ==
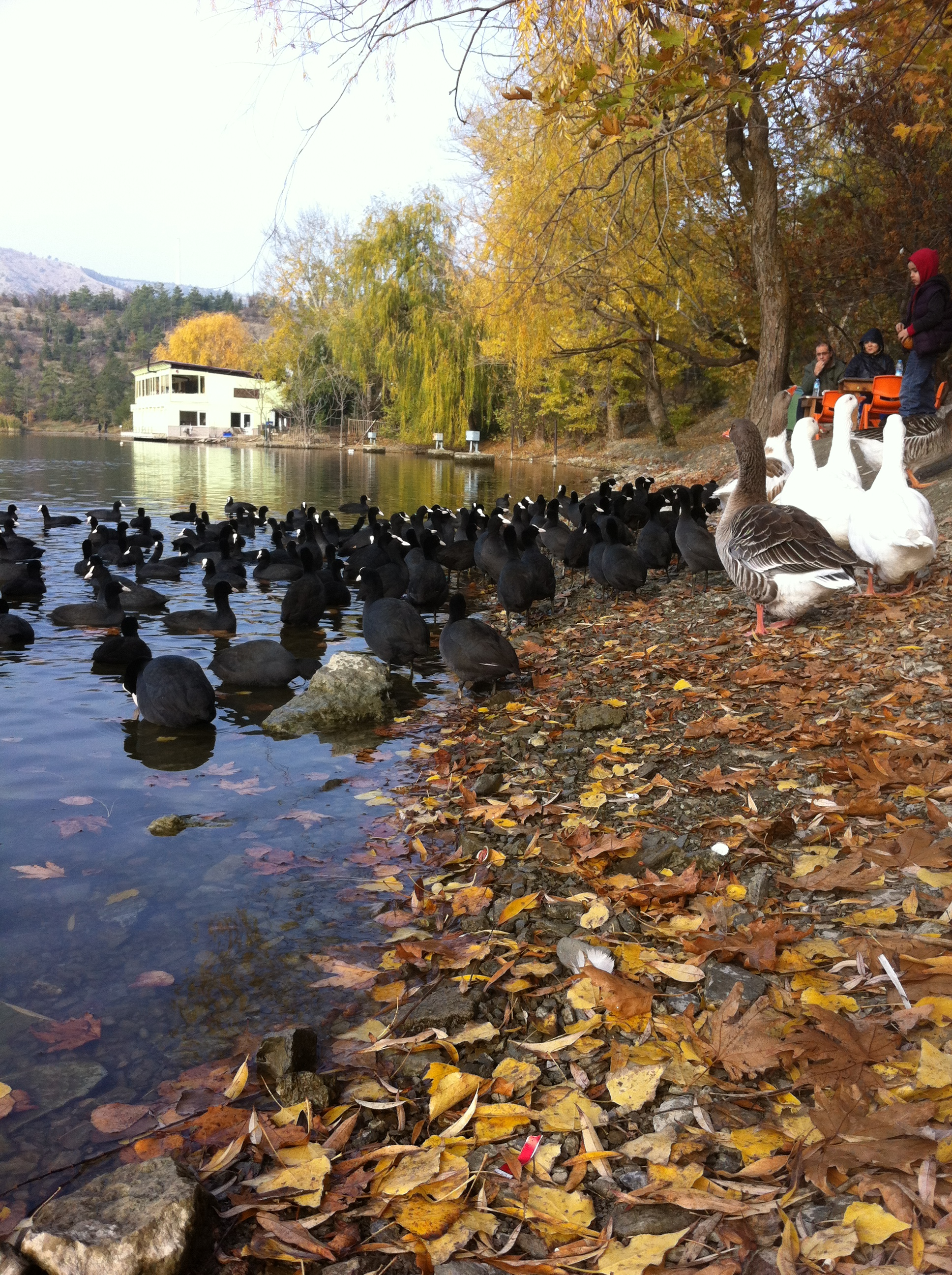

According to 1930 travel notes of Nahit Sırrı Örik the area surrounding the lake was arid land devoid of any green plantation. In 1956, 45 square kilometres (17 sq mi) land including Lake Eymir was allocated to the Middle East Technical University (Turkish: Orta Doğu Teknik Universitesi, ODTÜ) campus. METU is currently the only university in Turkey with a lake within its campus area. Immediately after 1956, the first rector of the university Kemal Kurdaş began a forestation project around the lake. Now most of the once-barren land is a pine forest. In 1995, Kemal Kurdas and Alattin Egemen, director of reforestation of the Middle East Technical University, shared the 1995 Aga Khan Award for Architecture for the re-forestation work done on 45 km^{2} area of Middle East Technical University including Lake Eymir and surroundings.

== Access ==
The lake has two entrances to the east and west, and it is open to public. Only cars with a special permit are admitted inside the lake area in order to eliminate the pollution and risk of traffic accidents. However the parking lots located near both entrances are free for use. For public use, there is a transportation services at the door to recreational areas.
