= Gölbek, Gölbaşı =

Gölbek
- Neighbourhood
- Location in Turkey Gölbek (Turkey Central Anatolia)
- Coordinates: 39°19′N 32°50′E
- Country: Turkey
- Province: Ankara
- District: Gölbaşı
- Population (2022): 204
- Time zone: UTC+3 (TRT)

Gölbek is a neighbourhood in the municipality and district of Gölbaşı, Ankara Province, Turkey. Its population is 204 (2022).
