= Karaoğlan, Gölbaşı =

Karaoğlan
- Neighbourhood
- Location in Turkey Karaoğlan (Turkey Central Anatolia)
- Coordinates: 39.7345°N 32.8302°E
- Country: Turkey
- Province: Ankara
- District: Gölbaşı
- Population (2022): 718
- Time zone: UTC+3 (TRT)

Karaoğlan is a neighbourhood in the municipality and district of Gölbaşı, Ankara Province, Turkey. Its population is 718 (2022).
