= Taşpınar, Gölbaşı =

Taşpınar
- Neighbourhood
- Location in Turkey Taşpınar (Turkey Central Anatolia)
- Coordinates: 39°49′43″N 32°45′27″E
- Country: Turkey
- Province: Ankara
- District: Gölbaşı
- Population (2022): 3,313
- Time zone: UTC+3 (TRT)

Taşpınar is a neighbourhood in the municipality and district of Gölbaşı, Ankara Province, Turkey. Its population is 3,313 (2022).
