= Yavrucuk, Gölbaşı =

Yavrucuk
- Neighbourhood
- Location in Turkey Yavrucuk (Turkey Central Anatolia)
- Coordinates: 39.6986°N 32.7381°E
- Country: Turkey
- Province: Ankara
- District: Gölbaşı
- Population (2022): 339
- Time zone: UTC+3 (TRT)

Yavrucuk is a neighbourhood in the municipality and district of Gölbaşı, Ankara Province, Turkey. Its population is 339 (2022).
