= Yurtbeyi, Gölbaşı =

Yurtbeyi
- Neighbourhood
- Location in Turkey Yurtbeyi (Turkey Central Anatolia)
- Coordinates: 39°45′N 32°52′E
- Country: Turkey
- Province: Ankara
- District: Gölbaşı
- Population (2022): 825
- Time zone: UTC+3 (TRT)

Yurtbeyi is a neighbourhood in the municipality and district of Gölbaşı, Ankara Province, Turkey. Its population is 825 (2022).
