= Cadier =

Village in Limburg, Netherlands

Coordinates: 50°50′N 5°46′E

Cadier is a former village in the Dutch province of Limburg. It is now part of Cadier en Keer.

Until 1828, "Cadier" was also the name of a municipality; it then changed its name to "Cadier en Keer".
