= Soğulcak, Gölbaşı =

Soğulcak
- Neighbourhood
- Location in Turkey Soğulcak (Turkey Central Anatolia)
- Coordinates: 39.5230°N 32.8692°E
- Country: Turkey
- Province: Ankara
- District: Gölbaşı
- Population (2022): 178
- Time zone: UTC+3 (TRT)

Soğulcak is a neighbourhood in the municipality and district of Gölbaşı, Ankara Province, Turkey. Its population is 178 (2022).
