= Karaali, Gölbaşı =

Karaali Merkez
- Neighbourhood
- Country: Turkey
- Province: Ankara
- District: Gölbaşı
- Population (2022): 251
- Time zone: UTC+3 (TRT)

Karaali Merkez is a neighbourhood in the municipality and district of Gölbaşı, Ankara Province, Turkey. Its population is 251 (2022).

Karaali was a village in Bala District that was elevated to town status in 1991. In 2008, the town was dissolved, its central area went to the Gölbaşı District, the villages Tohumlar, Karahasanlı, Kömürcü, Evciler, Çavuşlu, Yayla and Akarlar went to the Çankaya District, and the villages Ahmetçayırı and Yöreli remained in the Bala District.
