= Ballıkpınar, Gölbaşı =

Ballıkpınar
- Neighbourhood
- Location in Turkey Ballıkpınar (Turkey Central Anatolia)
- Coordinates: 39°44′N 32°43′E
- Country: Turkey
- Province: Ankara
- District: Gölbaşı
- Population (2022): 1,443
- Time zone: UTC+3 (TRT)

Ballıkpınar is a neighborhood in the municipality and district of Gölbaşı, Ankara Province, Turkey. Its population is 1,443 (2022).
