= İkizce, Gölbaşı =

İkizce
- Neighbourhood
- Country: Turkey
- Province: Ankara
- District: Gölbaşı
- Population (2022): 332
- Time zone: UTC+3 (TRT)

İkizce is a neighbourhood in the municipality and district of Gölbaşı, Ankara Province, Turkey. Its population is 332 (2022).
