= Barış Çin =

Turkish billiards player (born 1975)

Personal information
- Born: 27 July 1975 (age 51) Turkey

Pool career
- Country: Turkey

Medal record

Men's artistic billiards

Representing Turkey

World Championship
Silver medal – second place	2024 Ankara	Individual
Bronze medal – third place	2023 Ankara	Individual

Grand Prix
Gold medal – first place	2014 Doetinchem	Individua

European Championship
Gold medal – first place	2024 Ankara	Individual
Bronze medal – third place	2015 Brandenburg	Individual

European Championship National Teams
Gold medal – first place	2024 Antalya	Team
Gold medal – first place	2023 Antalya	Team

Barış Çin (born 27 July 1975) is a Turkish carom and artistic billiards player. He is a and world chhampion in artistic billiards.

== Personal life ==
Barış Çin was born on 27 July 1975.

== Sport career ==
Çin became global artistic champion at the 2014 Grand Prix in Doetinchem, Netherlands defeating Frenchman Jean Reverchon by 3–0., and took so his first major success on the international podium. He took the bronze medal at the 2015 European Championship Artistic in Brandenburg, Germany. He became Turkish champion in 2023. He won the gold medal with his teammate Hacı Arap Yaman at the 2023 European Championship Artistic National Teams in Antalya, Turkey defeating the Spanish team by 3–1. The same year, he took the bronze medal at the Artistic Billiards World Championship in Ankara, Turkey. Çin and his teammate Yaman defeated Erik Van den Zegel and Erik Vervliet from Belgium by 3–1 in the final of the 2024 European Championship Artistic National Teams in Antalya, Turkey, and won the gold medal. He captured the gold medal at the 2024 European Championship Artistic in Ankara, Turkey defeating Michael Hammen from France in the final match by 186–180. He won the silver medal at the World Championship in Ankara after losing the final match to his countryman Hacı Arap Yaman.
