= Örencik, Gölbaşı =

Örencik
- Neighbourhood
- Location in Turkey Örencik (Turkey Central Anatolia)
- Coordinates: 39.7800°N 32.8326°E
- Country: Turkey
- Province: Ankara
- District: Gölbaşı
- Population (2022): 1,074
- Time zone: UTC+3 (TRT)

Örencik is a neighbourhood in the municipality and district of Gölbaşı, Ankara Province, Turkey. Its population is 1,074 (2022).
