= Bağiçi, Gölbaşı =

Bağiçi
- Neighbourhood
- Location in Turkey Bağiçi (Turkey Central Anatolia)
- Coordinates: 39°32′16″N 32°54′35″E
- Country: Turkey
- Province: Ankara
- District: Gölbaşı
- Population (2022): 302
- Time zone: UTC+3 (TRT)

Bağiçi is a neighbourhood in the municipality and district of Gölbaşı, Ankara Province, Turkey. Its population is 302 (2022). In 2007 it passed from the Bala District to the Gölbaşı District.
