= Çayırlı, Gölbaşı =

Çayırlı
- Neighbourhood
- Country: Turkey
- Province: Ankara
- District: Gölbaşı
- Population (2022): 179
- Time zone: UTC+3 (TRT)

Çayırlı is a neighbourhood in the municipality and district of Gölbaşı, Ankara Province, Turkey. Its population is 179 (2022).

== History ==
While it was previously part of the Haymana district, it was annexed to the Gölbaşı district on June 3, 1988. Its legal entity as a village ended and it was converted into a neighborhood as it remained within the 50 km radius determining the boundaries of the Ankara Metropolitan Municipality, pursuant to Provisional Article 2 of the Metropolitan Municipality Law dated July 23, 2004, and numbered 5216.
