= Yağlıpınar, Gölbaşı =

Yağlıpınar
- Neighbourhood
- Location in Turkey Yağlıpınar (Turkey Central Anatolia)
- Coordinates: 39.6536°N 32.8033°E
- Country: Turkey
- Province: Ankara
- District: Gölbaşı
- Population (2022): 344
- Time zone: UTC+3 (TRT)

Yağlıpınar is a neighbourhood in the municipality and district of Gölbaşı, Ankara Province, Turkey. Its population is 344 (2022).
