= Turkish Billiards Federation =

Turkish Billiards Federation Türkiye Bilardo Federasyonu
- Sport: Cue sport
- Abbreviation: (TBF)
- Founded: 1993
- Affiliation: Union Mondiale de Billard (UMB)
- Regional affiliation: Confédération Européenne de Billard (CEB)
- Headquarters: Gölbaşı International Billiards Complex, Ankara
- Location: Ankara, Turkey
- President: Ersan Ercan

Official website
- www.bilardo.gov.tr

Turkish Billiards Federation (Turkish: Türkiye Bilardo Federasyonu, TBF) is the governing body of the cue sports in Turkey. Founded in 1993, it has been based at Gölbaşı International Billiards Complex in Ankara since November 2021. The Turkish organization is member of the Confédération Européenne de Billard (CEB) and the Union Mondiale de Billard (UMB).

The Turkish Billiard Federation organizes cue sports competitions at national, European and World level.

== National competitions ==
National level official competitions are:

Three-cushion billiards
- Turkish Three-cushion Championship
- Turkish Three-cushion First League
- Turkish Three-cushion Teams Championship
- Turkish Women"s Three-cushion Championship
- Turkish Youth Three-cushion Championship

Pool
- Turkish Pool Championship
- Inter University Pool Tournament

Artistic billiards
- Turkish Artistic billiards Championship

== Presidents ==
- 2014–present Ersan Ercan,
