= İncek, Gölbaşı =

İncek
- Neighbourhood
- Location in Turkey İncek (Turkey Central Anatolia)
- Coordinates: 39°48′N 32°42′E
- Country: Turkey
- Province: Ankara
- District: Gölbaşı
- Population (2022): 5,578
- Time zone: UTC+3 (TRT)

İncek is a neighbourhood in the municipality and district of Gölbaşı, Ankara Province, Turkey. Its population is 5,578 (2022).
