= Günalan, Gölbaşı =

Günalan
- Neighbourhood
- Location in Turkey Günalan (Turkey Central Anatolia)
- Coordinates: 39.6239°N 32.8822°E
- Country: Turkey
- Province: Ankara
- District: Gölbaşı
- Population (2022): 149
- Time zone: UTC+3 (TRT)

Günalan is a neighbourhood in the municipality and district of Gölbaşı, Ankara Province, Turkey. Its population is 149 (2022).
