= Oyaca Akarsu, Gölbaşı =

Oyaca Akarsu
- Neighbourhood
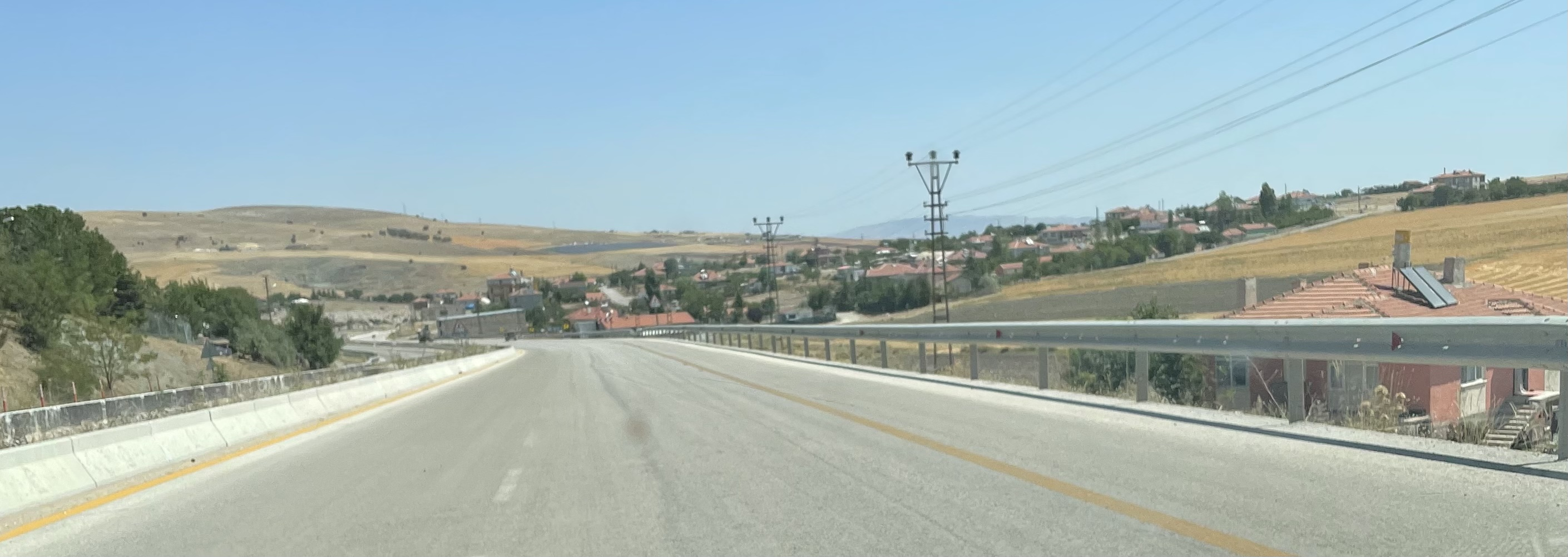
- Oyaca Akarsu, Gölbaşı District, Ankara Province

- Location within Turkey Location within Turkey Central Anatolia
- Coordinates: 39°32′26″N 32°36′35″E
- Country: Turkey
- Province: Ankara
- District: Gölbaşı
- Population (2022): 937
- Time zone: UTC+3 (TRT)

Oyaca Akarsu is a neighbourhood of District of Gölbaşı, Ankara Province, Turkey. Its population is 937 (2022). Oyaca was an independent municipality until it was merged into the municipality of Gölbaşı in 2008.
