= Akörençarşak, Gölbaşı =

Akörençarşak
- Neighbourhood
- Location in Turkey Akörençarşak (Turkey Central Anatolia)
- Coordinates: 39°19′N 32°57′E
- Country: Turkey
- Province: Ankara
- District: Gölbaşı
- Population (2022): 275
- Time zone: UTC+3 (TRT)

Akörençarşak is a neighbourhood in the District of Gölbaşı, Ankara Province, Turkey. Its population is 275 (2022).
