= Çimşit, Gölbaşı =

Çimşit
- Neighbourhood
- Location in Turkey Çimşit (Turkey Central Anatolia)
- Coordinates: 39.4315°N 32.8916°E
- Country: Turkey
- Province: Ankara
- District: Gölbaşı
- Population (2022): 301
- Time zone: UTC+3 (TRT)

Çimşit is a neighbourhood in the municipality and district of Gölbaşı, Ankara Province, Turkey. Its population is 301 (2022).
