= Mahmatlı, Gölbaşı =

Mahmatlı
- Neighbourhood
- Location in Turkey Mahmatlı (Turkey Central Anatolia)
- Coordinates: 39.5572°N 32.9019°E
- Country: Turkey
- Province: Ankara
- District: Gölbaşı
- Population (2022): 279
- Time zone: UTC+3 (TRT)

Mahmatlı is a neighbourhood in the municipality and district of Gölbaşı, Ankara Province, Turkey. Its population is 279 (2022).
