= Koparan, Gölbaşı =

Koparan
- Neighbourhood
- Location in Turkey Koparan (Turkey Central Anatolia)
- Coordinates: 39.7268°N 32.6676°E
- Country: Turkey
- Province: Ankara
- District: Gölbaşı
- Population (2022): 520
- Time zone: UTC+3 (TRT)

Koparan is a neighbourhood in the municipality and district of Gölbaşı, Ankara Province, Turkey. Its population is 520 (2022).
