= Tepeyurt, Gölbaşı =

Tepeyurt
- Neighbourhood
- Location in Turkey Tepeyurt (Turkey Central Anatolia)
- Coordinates: 39.5509°N 32.8213°E
- Country: Turkey
- Province: Ankara
- District: Gölbaşı
- Population (2022): 179
- Time zone: UTC+3 (TRT)

Tepeyurt is a neighbourhood in the municipality and district of Gölbaşı, Ankara Province, Turkey. Its population is 179 (2022).
