= Cadier en Keer =

- Village
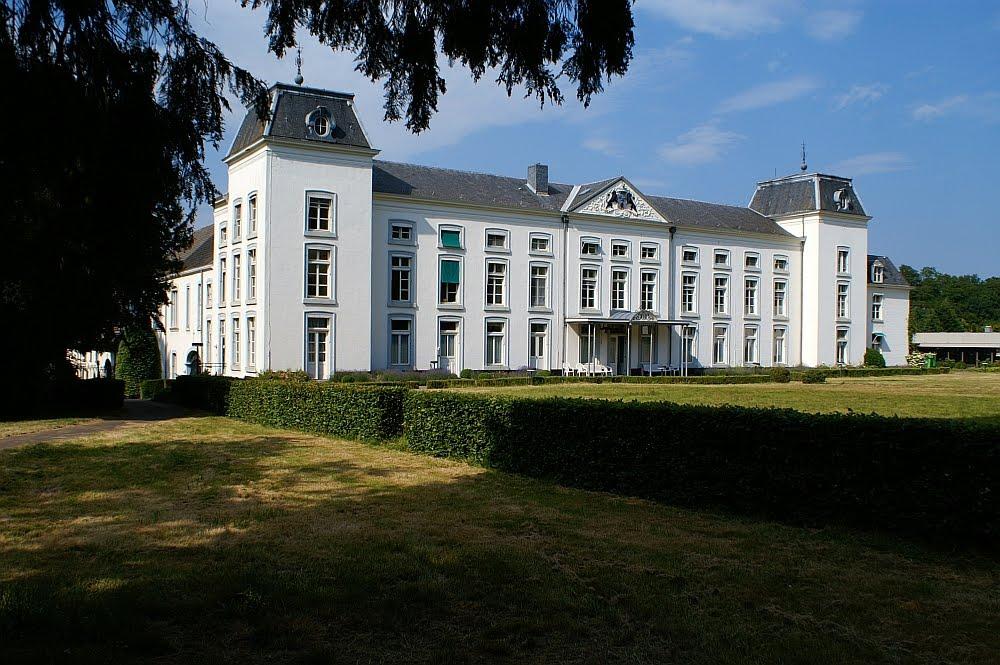
- Blankenberg Castle at Cadier en Keer

- Location in the Netherlands Location in the province of Limburg in the Netherlands
- Coordinates: 50°49′38″N 5°46′10″E
- Country: Netherlands
- Province: Limburg
- Municipality: Eijsden-Margraten

Area
  - Total: 1.55 km^{2} (0.60 sq mi)
- Elevation: 127 m (417 ft)

Population (2021)
  - Total: 3,205
  - Density: 2,070/km^{2} (5,360/sq mi)
- Time zone: UTC+1 (CET)
  - Summer (DST): UTC+2 (CEST)
- Postal code: 6267
- Dialing code: 043
- Major roads: N278

Cadier en Keer (Limburgish: Keer) is a village in the Dutch province of Limburg. It is a part of the municipality of Eijsden-Margraten, and lies about 5 km east of Maastricht.

== History ==
The village was first mentioned in 1266 as Cadirs. It has a double name, but it has always been a single village. The northern side of the road fell under Heer as Keer while the southern side fell under Dalhem as Cadier. In 1662, the village became part of the Dutch Republic.

The Catholic Exaltation Church is an aisleless church with detached tower. The tower has 12th century elements. The church was built between 1957 and 1958 in traditional style.

Blankenberg Castle was first mentioned in 1371. The current building dates from 1825. In 1904, it became a monastery of the French fraternity of Saint Blaise. The mission house was built in 1891. The originally buildings burnt down in 1954. It currently houses the Africa museum.

Cadier was a separate municipality until 1828. Cadier en Keer was a separate municipality between 1828 and 1982, when it was merged with Margraten. Cadier was home to 215 people in 1840 and Keer had 335 inhabitants. In 2011, the village became part of the municipality of Eijsden-Margraten.

== Gallery ==
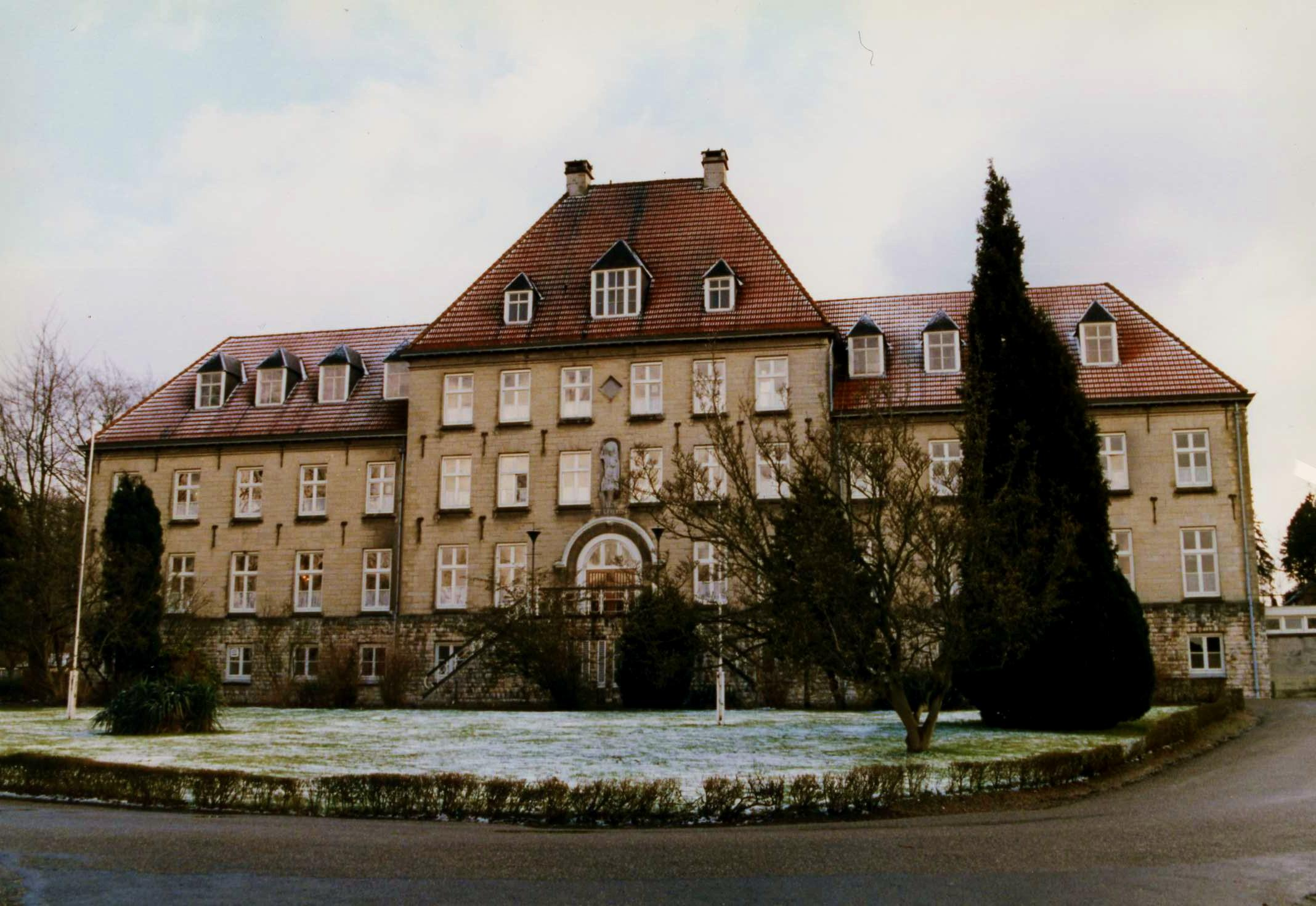
Gerlach building at Cadier en Keer

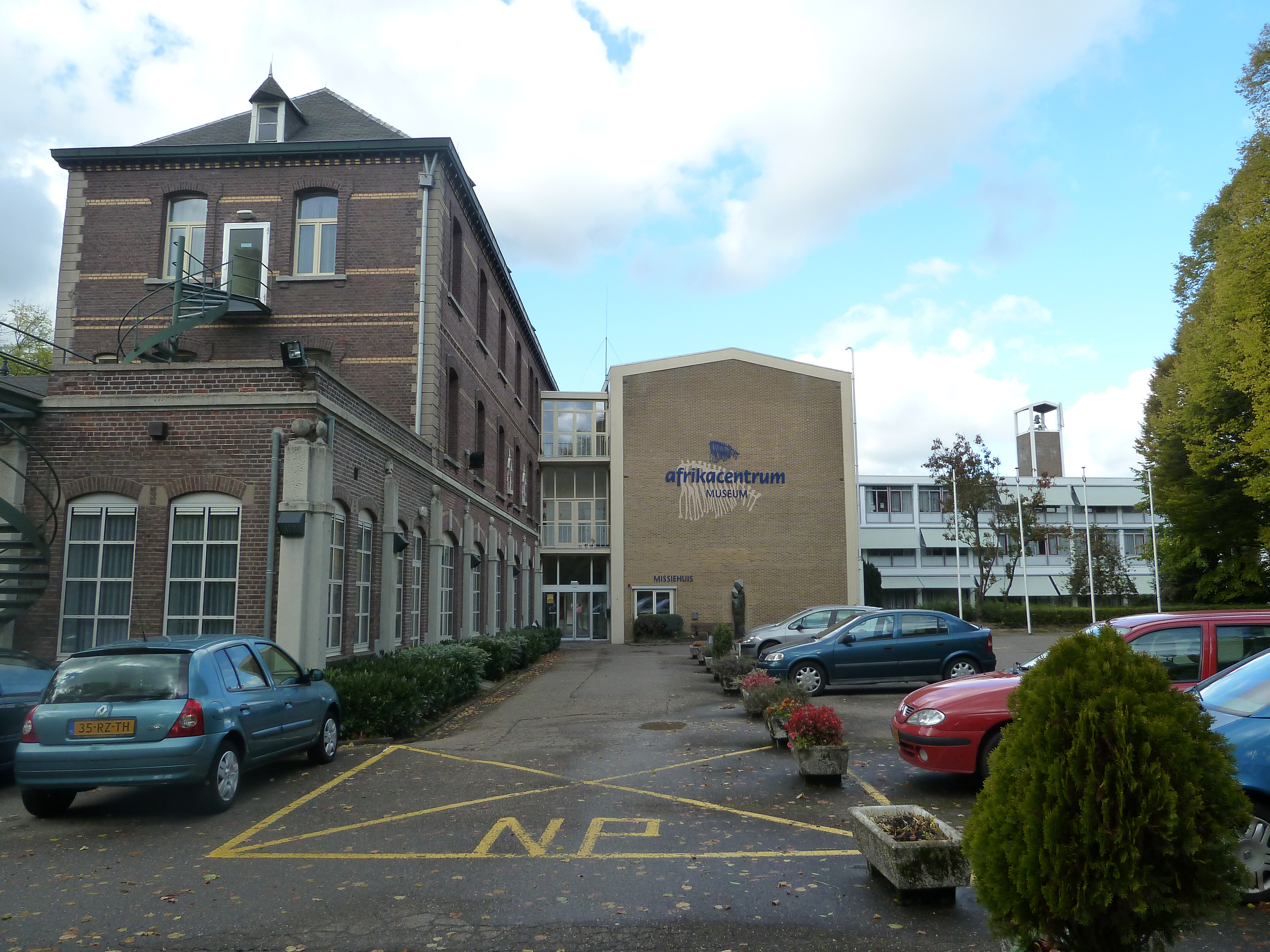
Mission house and Africa museum

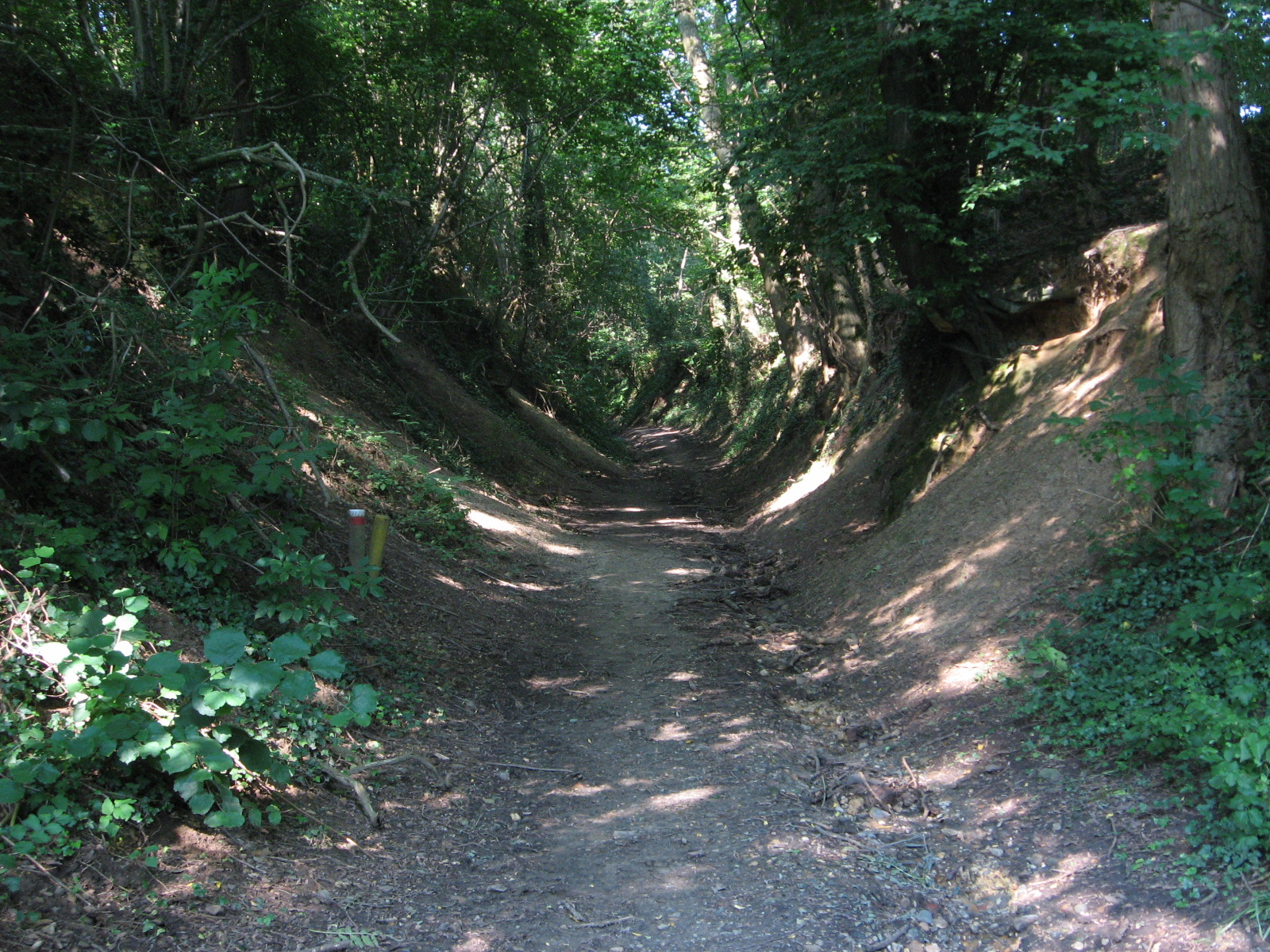
Forest road
