= Lake Mogan =

Turkish lake

- Mogan Gölü (Turkish)
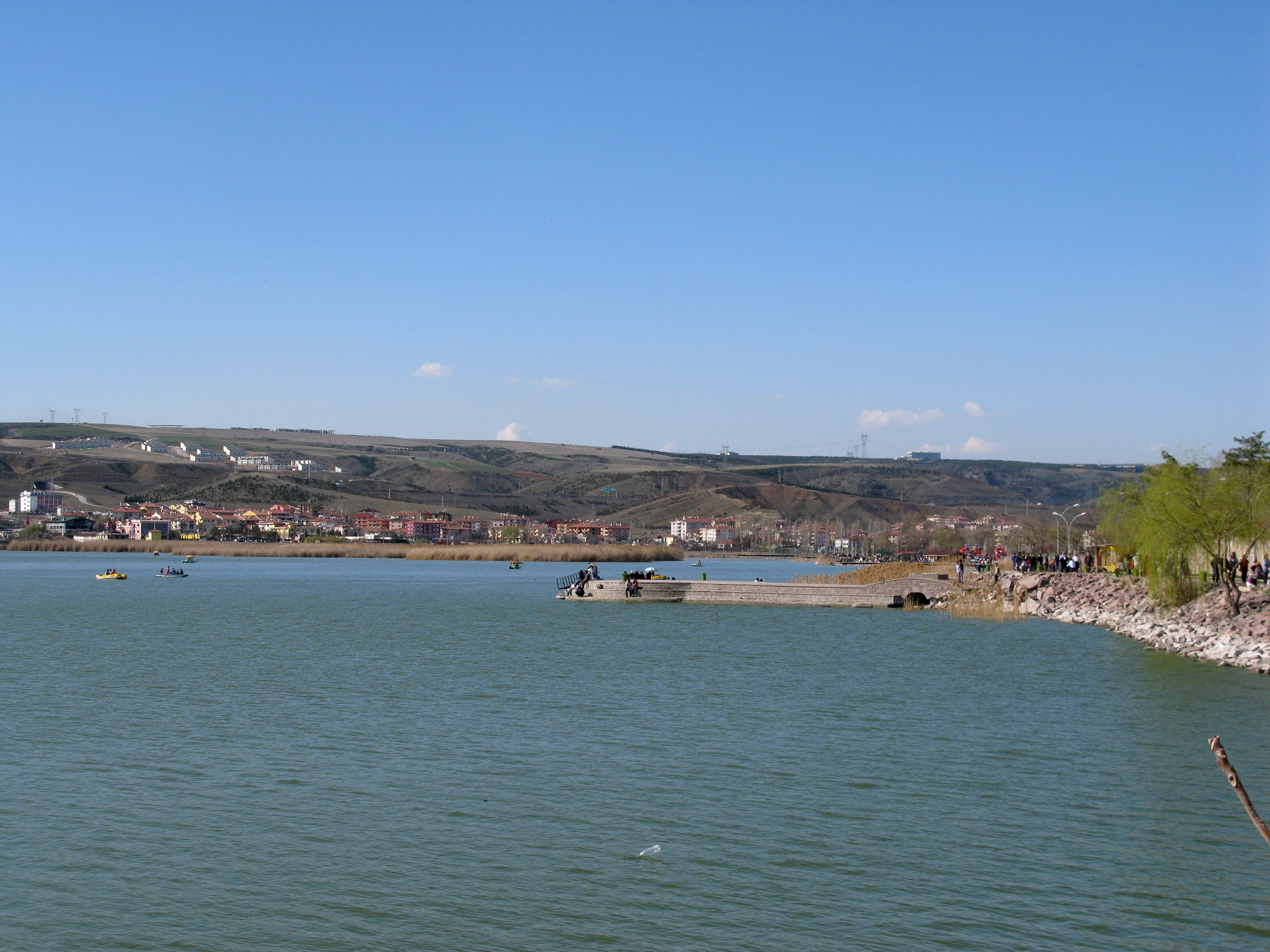
- Lake Mogan

- Location of the lake in Turkey.
- Location: Gölbaşı, Ankara Province, Turkey
- Coordinates: 39°46′N 32°48′E
- Basin countries: Turkey
- Surface area: 561 ha (1,390 acres)
- Average depth: 5 m (16 ft)
- Surface elevation: 972 m (3,189 ft)

Lake Mogan (Turkish: Mogan Gölü, also called Gölbaşı Gölü) is a small lake in Ankara Province, Turkey.

== Geography ==
The lake is 25 kilometres (16 mi) south of the Ankara city center within the intracity district of Gölbaşı. The eastern shore lies along the highway D.750 which traverses Turkey from north to south. The altitude of the water surface with respect to sea level is about 972 metres (3,189 ft) and the surface area of the lake is about 5.61 square kilometres (2.17 sq mi). It has a circumferential length of 14 kilometers with a length of 11 km. and an average width of 500 meters. The average depth of the lake (in wet season) is about 5 meters.

== Geology ==
The lake is an alluvial set lake. The tributaries are rivulets with irregular flowrates. During the rainy seasons, the level increases beyond a certain level and the water is fed to the nearby Lake Eymir about 3 kilometres (1.9 mi) to north east. According to a report cited by M. Bülent Varlık (ODTÜ’lüler Bülteni N.130 Belleten of Middle East Technical University), during the flood in 1910, Lake Mogan temporarily merged with Lake Eymir.

== Recreation area ==
Lake Mogan has always been one of the picnic areas of Ankara. Along the shore there are many restaurants as well as camping and fishing points where the main game fish is carb fish. In 2001 the Metropolitan municipality of Ankara has established a recreation area named Mogan Park at the west shore of the lake. The total area of the park is 601,879 square metres (6,478,570 sq ft) where 203,650 square metres (2,192,100 sq ft) is reserved for the endangered waterfowl. The total length of the walking track in the area is 130 kilometres (81 mi)
