= Topaklı, Gölbaşı =

Topaklı
- Neighbourhood
- Country: Turkey
- Province: Ankara
- District: Gölbaşı
- Population (2022): 488
- Time zone: UTC+3 (TRT)

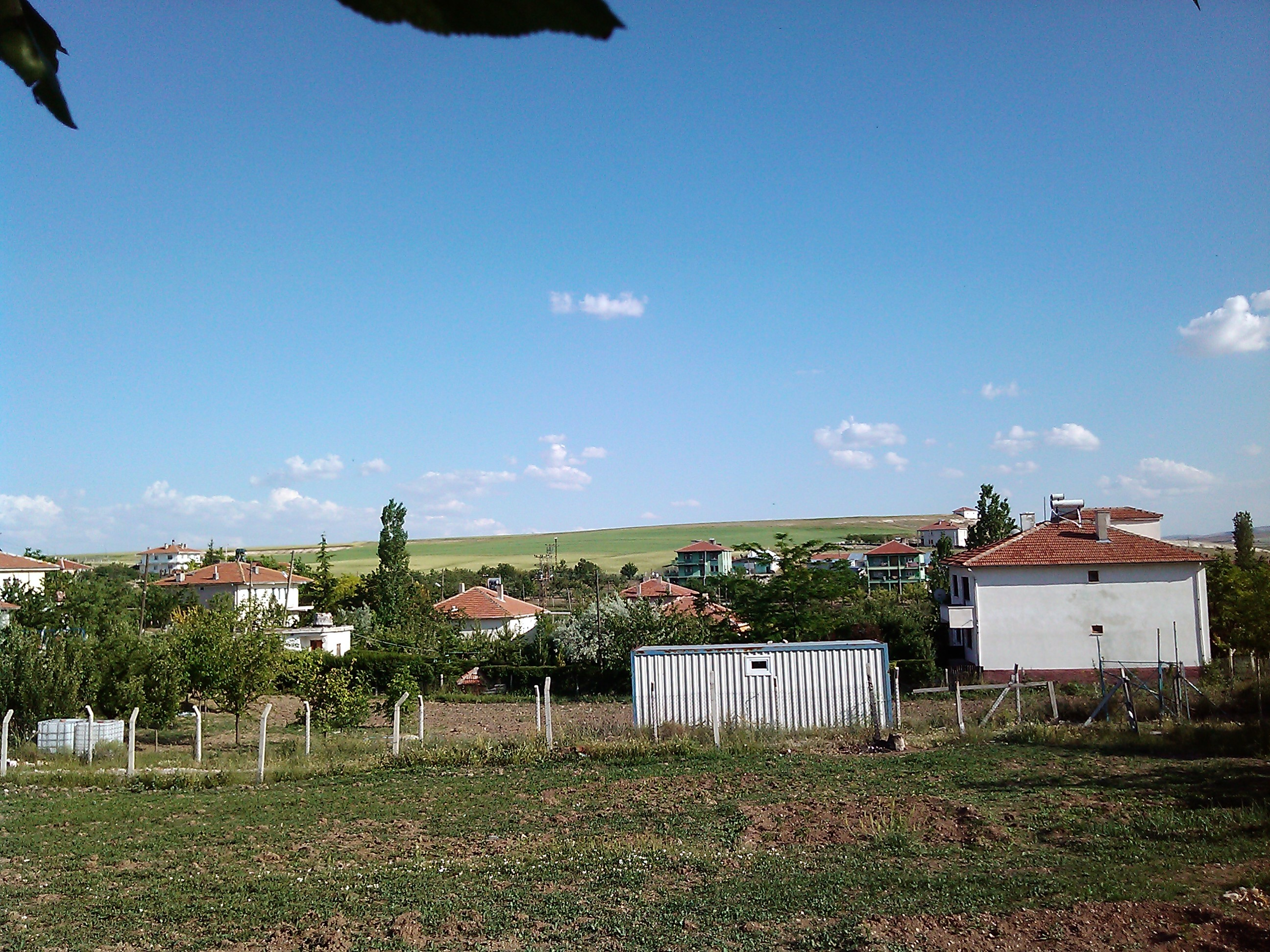
Topaklı

Topaklı is a neighbourhood in the municipality and district of Gölbaşı, Ankara Province, Turkey. Its population is 488 (2022).
