= 2008 Artistic Billiards World Championship =

The 2008 Artistic Billiards World Championship was held between 1 and 5 April 2008 in Schelle, Belgium.

Hacı Arap Yaman won in the final 3–2 against Xavier Fonellosa.

== Qualification ==
=== Pool A ===
POS	Player	MP	MW	SW	SL	PTS. Made	PTS. Poss.	PTS	%
1	(Turkey) Hacı Arap Yaman	3	3	9	2	513	712	6	73,076
2	(Netherlands) Ruud de Vos	3	2	8	7	512	937	4	62,540
3	(Japan) Tadashi Machida	3	1	5	6	337	652	2	51,687
4	(Mexico) Norberto Gracia	3	0	2	9	216	672	0	34,142

Player	SV	1	2	3	4	5	Points	%
(Netherlands) Ruud de Vos	2	44	52	46	43	43	228	65,517
(Turkey) Hacı Arap Yaman	3	39	47	53	50	65	254	71,549

Player	SV	1	2	3	Points	%
(Japan) Tadashi Machida	3	28	22	37	87	44,617
(Mexico) Norberto Gracia	0	21	5	30	56	26,046

Player	SV	1	2	3	Points	%
(Turkey) Hacı Arap Yaman	3	51	40	50	142	78,453
(Japan) Tadashi Machida	0	33	11	33	77	44,508

Player	SV	1	2	3	4	5	Points	%
(Netherlands) Ruud de Vos	3	34	46	31	19	45	175	58,724
(Mexico) Norberto Gracia	2	46	32	12	35	0	125	41,806

Player	SV	1	2	3	Points	%
(Turkey) Hacı Arap Yaman	3	30	37	50	117	70,481
(Mexico) Norberto Gracia	0	6	6	23	35	22,151

Player	SV	1	2	3	4	5	Points	%
(Netherlands) Ruud de Vos	3	21	12	43	56	51	183	70,481
(Japan) Tadashi Machida	2	45	45	23	34	26	173	60,915

=== Pool B ===
POS	Player	MP	MW	SW	SL	PTS. Made	PTS. Poss.	PTS	%
1	(France) Madou Touré	3	3	9	0	319	568	6	56,161
2	(Belgium) Walter Bax	3	2	6	3	334	538	4	62,081
3	(Mexico) Facundo Prieto	3	1	3	6	112	536	2	20895
4	(South Korea) Jong Sok Kim	3	0	0	9	92	544	0	16,911

Player	SV	1	2	3	Points	%
(France) Madou Touré	3	41	36	46	123	54,666
(Belgium) Walter Bax	0	39	25	41	105	48,837

Player	SV	1	2	3	Points	%
(Mexico) Facundo Prieto	3	20	6	22	48	23,414
(South Korea) Jong Sok Kim	0	5	0	13	18	8,372

Player	SV	1	2	3	Points	%
(France) Madou Touré	3	33	32	26	91	52,000
(Mexico) Facundo Prieto	0	21	11	0	32	18,497

Player	SV	1	2	3	Points	%
(Belgium) Walter Bax	3	35	45	35	115	72,784
(South Korea) Jong Sok Kim	0	12	13	13	38	23,602

Player	SV	1	2	3	Points	%
(Belgium) Walter Bax	3	41	40	33	114	69,090
(Mexico) Facundo Prieto	0	11	11	10	32	20,253

Player	SV	1	2	3	Points	%
(France) Madou Touré	3	34	35	36	105	62,500
(South Korea) Jong Sok Kim	0	13	18	5	36	21,428

=== Pool C ===
POS	Player	MP	MW	SW	SL	PTS. Made	PTS. Poss.	PTS	%
1	(Germany) Thomas Ahrens	3	3	9	3	529	799	6	66,207
2	(Turkey) Yavuz Öney	3	2	6	7	476	817	4	58,261
3	(Japan) Tomotaka Takahashi	3	1	6	6	428	840	2	50,952
4	(Spain) Jordi Oliver	3	0	4	9	441	873	0	50,515

Player	SV	1	2	3	4	5	Points	%
(Germany) Thomas Ahrens	3	46	16	25	51	50	188	57,317
(Spain) Jordi Oliver	2	41	37	29	40	40	187	53,735

Player	SV	1	2	3	4	5	Points	%
(Turkey) Yavuz Öney	3	28	21	25	37	41	152	47,798
(Japan) Tomotaka Takahashi	2	21	35	10	51	37	154	44,637

Player	SV	1	2	3	Points	%
(Germany) Thomas Ahrens	3	58	50	58	166	91,712
(Turkey) Yavuz Öney	0	35	36	36	107	59,116

Player	SV	1	2	3	Points	%
(Japan) Tomotaka Takahashi	3	38	49	44	131	63,902
(Spain) Jordi Oliver	0	21	29	40	90	43,902

Player	SV	1	2	3	4	5	Points	%
(Turkey) Yavuz Öney	3	41	46	44	41	45	217	68,238
(Spain) Jordi Oliver	2	13	60	38	46	7	164	51,250

Player	SV	1	2	3	4	Points	%
(Germany) Thomas Ahrens	3	41	42	41	51	175	60,344
(Japan) Tomotaka Takahashi	1	21	33	47	42	143	49,310

=== Pool D ===
POS	Player	MP	MW	SW	SL	PTS. Made	PTS. Poss.	PTS	%
1	(France) Jean Reverchon	3	3	9	0	386	532	6	72,556
2	(Belgium) Jurgen Goris	3	2	6	4	326	606	4	53,795
3	(South Korea) Hong Seung Lee	3	1	4	6	200	592	2	33,783
4	(Mexico) Daniel Campos	3	0	0	9	137	544	0	25,183

Player	SV	1	2	3	Points	%
(France) Jean Reverchon	3	53	44	49	146	77,659
(Belgium) Jurgen Goris	0	39	16	35	90	50,000

Player	SV	1	2	3	Points	%
(South Korea) Hong Seung Lee	3	24	30	30	84	44,680
(Mexico) Daniel Campos	0	13	5	17	35	18,617

Player	SV	1	2	3	Points	%
(France) Jean Reverchon	3	54	39	37	130	73,033
(South Korea) Hong Seung Lee	0	37	14	5	56	33,333

Player	SV	1	2	3	Points	%
(Belgium) Jurgen Goris	3	50	32	25	107	54,040
(Mexico) Daniel Campos	0	29	16	21	66	33,333

Player	SV	1	2	3	Points	%
(France) Jean Reverchon	3	35	41	34	110	66,265
(Mexico) Daniel Campos	0	16	15	5	36	22,784

Player	SV	1	2	3	4	Points	%
(Belgium) Jurgen Goris	3	39	26	26	38	129	56,578
(South Korea) Hong Seung Lee	1	15	6	34	5	60	25,423

== Main tournament ==
=== Round robin stage ===
==== Pool A ====
POS	Player	MP	MW	SW	SL	PTS. Made	PTS. Poss.	PTS	%
1	(Turkey) Hacı Arap Yaman	3	2	8	5	631	837	4	75,388
2	(Netherlands) Sander Jonen	3	2	7	5	538	798	4	67,418
3	(Belgium) Jurgen Goris	3	1	7	8	648	1004	2	64541
4	(Belgium) Billy Daelman	3	1	4	8	429	779	2	55,070

Player	SV	1	2	3	4	5	Points	%
(Netherlands) Sander Jonen	3	22	26	49	58	57	212	63,283
(Belgium) Jurgen Goris	2	33	40	31	49	33	186	57,943

Player	SV	1	2	3	4	Points	%
(Belgium) Billy Daelman	1	28	61	24	27	140	58,091
(Turkey) Hacı Arap Yaman	3	49	51	50	50	200	83,333

Player	SV	1	2	3	4	Points	%
(Netherlands) Sander Jonen	1	42	56	51	25	174	66,159
(Turkey) Hacı Arap Yaman	3	55	49	53	52	209	76,556

Player	SV	1	2	3	4	5	Points	%
(Belgium) Jurgen Goris	2	35	39	50	47	28	199	57,183
(Belgium) Billy Daelman	3	10	49	58	32	37	186	53,488

Player	SV	1	2	3	Points	%
(Netherlands) Sander Jonen	3	51	51	50	152	76,000
(Belgium) Billy Daelman	0	48	31	24	103	54,210

Player	SV	1	2	3	4	5	Points	%
(Belgium) Jurgen Goris	3	47	55	65	41	55	263	78,507
(Turkey) Hacı Arap Yaman	2	27	60	44	55	36	222	68,518

==== Pool B ====
POS	Player	MP	MW	SW	SL	PTS. Made	PTS. Poss.	PTS	%
1	(Turkey) Serdar Gümüs	3	2	7	5	484	818	4	59,168
2	(Spain) Xavier Fonellosa	3	2	8	6	551	950	4	58,000
3	(Turkey) Yavuz Öney	3	1	5	6	441	735	2	60,000
4	(France) Jean Reverchon	3	1	5	8	487	898	2	54,231

Player	SV	1	2	3	Points	%
(Turkey) Serdar Gümüs	3	48	43	49	140	70,707
(Turkey) Yavuz Öney	0	34	38	32	104	50,731

Player	SV	1	2	3	4	5	Points	%
(Spain) Xavier Fonellosa	2	41	42	41	42	34	200	54,794
(France) Jean Reverchon	3	24	37	47	46	39	190	53,521

Player	SV	1	2	3	4	5	Points	%
(Turkey) Serdar Gümüs	3	24	53	7	56	40	180	52,941
(France) Jean Reverchon	2	34	48	39	42	35	198	56,896

Player	SV	1	2	3	4	5	Points	%
(Turkey) Yavuz Öney	2	45	35	43	34	41	198	60,923
(Spain) Xavier Fonellosa	3	14	25	48	48	46	181	57,460

Player	SV	1	2	3	Points	%
(Turkey) Yavuz Öney	3	38	54	47	139	67,804
(France) Jean Reverchon	0	26	39	34	99	57,460

Player	SV	1	2	3	4	Points	%
(Spain) Xavier Fonellosa	3	35	47	51	37	170	62,962
(Turkey) Serdar Gümüs	1	49	36	43	36	164	58,571

==== Pool C ====
POS	Player	MP	MW	SW	SL	PTS. Made	PTS. Poss.	PTS	%
1	(Belgium) Walter Bax	3	3	9	3	549	802	6	68,453
2	(Germany) Thomas Ahrens	3	2	7	5	567	848	4	66,843
3	(Belgium) Eric Daelman	3	1	7	7	625	953	2	65,582
4	(Mexico) Victor Campos	3	0	1	9	266	623	0	42,696

Player	SV	1	2	3	Points	%
(Belgium) Walter Bax	3	39	45	27	111	56,060
(Mexico) Victor Campos	0	24	23	22	69	34,848

Player	SV	1	2	3	4	5	Points	%
(Belgium) Eric Daelman	2	88	27	52	41	35	243	63,116
(Germany) Thomas Ahrens	3	78	40	43	51	50	262	68,051

Player	SV	1	2	3	4	Points	%
(Belgium) Walter Bax	3	54	56	23	48	181	66,300
(Germany) Thomas Ahrens	1	48	51	43	34	176	64,468

Player	SV	1	2	3	4	Points	%
(Mexico) Victor Campos	1	38	11	50	9	108	45,957
(Belgium) Eric Daelman	3	46	45	40	40	171	69,795

Player	SV	1	2	3	Points	%
(Germany) Thomas Ahrens	3	41	45	43	129	67,894
(Mexico) Victor Campos	0	14	44	31	89	46,842

Player	SV	1	2	3	4	5	Points	%
(Belgium) Eric Daelman	2	56	36	23	55	41	211	65,325
(Belgium) Walter Bax	3	52	58	49	39	59	257	77,643

==== Pool D ====
POS	Player	MP	MW	SW	SL	PTS. Made	PTS. Poss.	PTS	%
1	(France) Madou Touré	3	3	9	4	619	843	6	73,428
2	(Netherlands) Ruud de Vos	3	2	8	5	605	805	4	75,155
3	(France) Kevin Tran	3	1	7	8	647	974	2	66,427
4	(Japan) Hajime Watanabe	3	0	2	9	350	699	0	50,071

Player	SV	1	2	3	Points	%
(Japan) Hajime Watanabe	0	29	18	24	71	38,797
(Netherlands) Ruud de Vos	3	34	41	50	125	72,254

Player	SV	1	2	3	4	5	Points	%
(France) Kevin Tran	2	60	42	34	43	51	230	71,651
(France) Madou Touré	3	38	60	47	22	57	224	71,337

Player	SV	1	2	3	4	5	Points	%
(Japan) Hajime Watanabe	2	40	53	35	27	15	170	55,194
(France) Kevin Tran	3	51	35	25	37	50	196	60,681

Player	SV	1	2	3	4	5	Points	%
(Netherlands) Ruud de Vos	2	37	43	58	65	41	244	78,456
(France) Madou Touré	3	56	60	39	45	57	257	80,062

Player	SV	1	2	3	Points	%
(France) Madou Touré	3	42	45	51	138	66,346
(Japan) Hajime Watanabe	0	24	41	44	109	52,403

Player	SV	1	2	3	4	5	Points	%
(France) Kevin Tran	2	51	23	59	47	41	221	66,969
(Netherlands) Ruud de Vos	3	56	50	45	32	53	231	73,520

=== Knock-out stage ===
==== Quarter-finals ====
Player	SV	1	2	3	4	5	Points	%
(Turkey) Hacı Arap Yaman	3	81	40	36	60	65	209	72,122
(Germany) Thomas Ahrens	2	75	41	55	45	55	170	69,503

Player	SV	1	2	3	4	5	Points	%
(Spain) Xavier Fonellosa	3	20	49	55	55	58	237	68,103
(France) Madou Touré	2	45	52	31	46	49	223	66,966

Player	SV	1	2	3	4	Points	%
(Netherlands) Ruud de Vos	3	49	34	53	53	186	73,728
(Netherlands) Sander Jonen	1	38	49	34	33	164	64,062

Player	SV	1	2	3	4	Points	%
(Turkey) Serdar Gümüs	3	44	55	52	58	209	81,640
(Belgium) Walter Bax	1	38	61	38	33	170	62,271

==== Half-finals ====
Player	SV	1	2	3	4	Points	%
(Turkey) Hacı Arap Yaman	3	46	51	50	60	207	81,818
(Netherlands) Ruud de Vos	1	65	33	49	49	196	71,794

Player	SV	1	2	3	4	Points	%
(Spain) Xavier Fonellosa	3	40	49	58	41	188	74,308
(Turkey) Serdar Gümüs	1	56	42	38	27	163	61,977

==== Final ====
Player	SV	1	2	3	4	5	Points	%
(Turkey) Hacı Arap Yaman	3	59	65	55	50	52	281	79,154
(Spain) Xavier Fonellosa	2	39	48	56	63	38	244	72,835
