= Artistic billiards =

Cue sport played on a billiard table

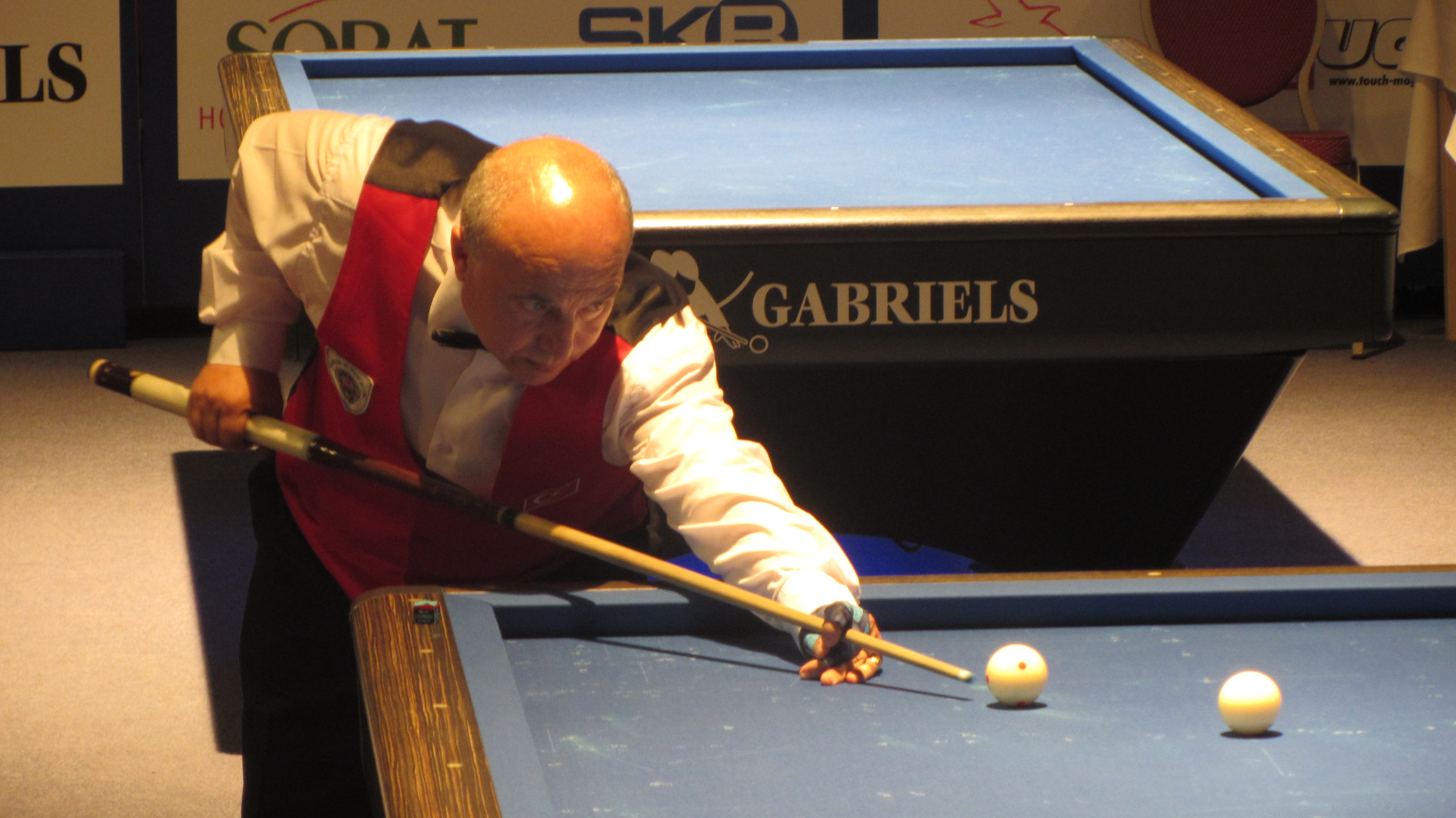
Artistic billiards final at the 2013 European Carom Billiards Championship

Artistic billiards is a cue sport played on a billiard table. A discipline of carom billiards, players aim to recreate a portion of 76 pre-set shots of varying difficulty against an opponent. Each of the 76 shots has a maximum point value assigned for perfect execution, ranging from a four-point maximum for lowest level difficulty shots, and climbing to an eleven-point maximum. There are a total of 500 points available to a player, representing the combined value of a perfect score on all 76 shots, although not all games are played with the full shot catalogue. The governing body of the sport is the Confédération International de Billard Artistique.

A version of the game, played on a pocket billiards table known as artistic pool began in the 1970s, with official competitions starting in 1993. These events are run and organised by the World Pool-Billiard Association (WPA).

== Rules ==
Played on a billiard table, players take turns to try to recreate shots from pre-set positions. Players are allowed three attempts at each shot. Each shot is valued at between four and eleven points, dependent on difficulty. Matches begin with players competing for a lag which denotes which player goes first.

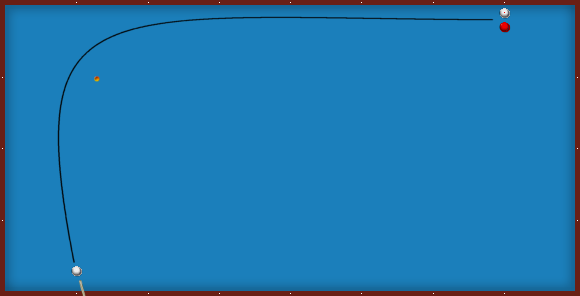
A massé shot around a pin; this is Figure A10, worth 10 points.

Players may use up to twenty separate cues providing different performance functions. For example, performing massés may require a cue with a very large diameter terminus and a specialized cue tip, while jumping may require a short, light cue with a flat (rather than rounded), very hard and also wider cue tip than a playing cue. Some shots may require the use of props such as a small pin placed precisely on the table surface and around which the player is required to make the cue ball pass on a designated side (see Figure A10 illustration). For the most part, top artistic billiard players specialize in the game to the exclusion of all others.

World title competition first started in 1986 and required the use of ivory balls. However, this requirement was dropped in 1990. The highest score ever achieved in world competition was 374, by the Frenchman Jean Reverchon in 1992, while the highest score in competition overall is 427 set by the Belgian Walter Bax in 2006. The game is played predominantly in Western Europe, especially in France, Belgium and the Netherlands. The game employs a specialized vocabulary, chiefly derived from French words, encompassing many terms that have no analogues in other cue sports disciplines. Some examples are coup fouetté ("whip shot"; a type of force follow); massé coulé (a massé shot with follow) and piqué (describes either a massé shot with no english, or a shot in which the cue stick is steeply angled, but not held quite as vertical as it is in full massé).

== Artistic pool ==
Competitive trick shot events, inspired by artistic billiards, began in the 1970s. Coordinated by world champion Paul Gerni with the World Trick Shot Artists Association, events were first held until 2000, when the World Pool-Billiard Association created the WPA World Artistic Pool Championship. The matches were known as "artistic pool", played on a pocket billiards table, and featuring a program of 160 shots to attempt, many of which were used in the previous formats of trick shot competitions, such as at the World Snooker Trickshot Championship. Other organisations, such as the Billiard Congress of America and European Pocket Billiard Federation made regional Artistic Pool championships. Shots are divided into eight "disciplines", including trick/fancy, prop/novelty/special arts, and disciplines for extremes in each of the core cueing techniques. The current world governing body for this sport is the WPA Artistic Pool Division, while the current largest league and player organization is the US-based Artistic Pool & Trick Shot Association, which organizes the World Artistic Pool Championship (WAPC) annually, held concurrently with the more general VNEA International Pool Championship.

In competitions, competitors would have three chances to successfully perform each trick, earning full points if they are successful on their first attempts and incrementally reduced points for subsequent attempts. Each shot has an associated difficulty rating (also the point value) with a higher rating being more difficult. A preliminary round of 40 shots is performed, and the top players (the number varies depending on the number of competitors, but usually the top 12) proceed into a head-to-head playoff format to determine the winner. Official artistic pool competitions often feature equipment limitations, such as playing with a single cue or all shots not being allowed to leave the bed of the table.
