= Çələbilər =

Çələbilər may refer to:

- Çələbilər, Barda, Azerbaijan
- Çələbilər, Jabrayil, Azerbaijan
- Çelebiler, Sındırgı, Turkey
