= Tumaslı =

Tumaslı or Tumasly or Tumaslu may refer to:

- Tumaslı, Barda, Azerbaijan
- Tumaslı, Nakhchivan, Azerbaijan
