= Çayırköy =

Çayırköy can refer to the following villages in Turkey:

- Çayırköy, Bolu
- Çayırköy, Maden
- Çayırköy, Merzifon
- Çayırköy, Osmancık
- Çayırköy, Sındırgı

== See also ==
- Çayırköy Cave
