= Vayxır =

Vayxır or Vaykhyr may refer to:

- Vayxır, Babek, Azerbaijan
- Vayxır, Sharur, Azerbaijan
