= Yusufçamı, Sındırgı =

Village in Turkey

Yusufçamı
- Neighbourhood
- Location in Turkey Yusufçamı (Marmara)
- Coordinates: 39°18′N 28°14′E
- Country: Turkey
- Province: Balıkesir
- District: Sındırgı
- Population (2022): 421
- Time zone: UTC+3 (TRT)

Yusufçamı is a neighbourhood in the municipality and district of Sındırgı, Balıkesir Province in Turkey. Its population is 421 (2022).
