= Düvertepe, Sındırgı =

Village in Turkey

Düvertepe
- Neighbourhood
- Location in Turkey Düvertepe (Marmara)
- Coordinates: 39°14′N 28°26′E
- Country: Turkey
- Province: Balıkesir
- District: Sındırgı
- Population (2022): 259
- Time zone: UTC+3 (TRT)

Düvertepe is a neighbourhood in the municipality and district of Sındırgı, Balıkesir Province in Turkey. Its population is 259 (2022).
