= Kürendere, Sındırgı =

Village in Turkey

Kürendere
- Neighbourhood
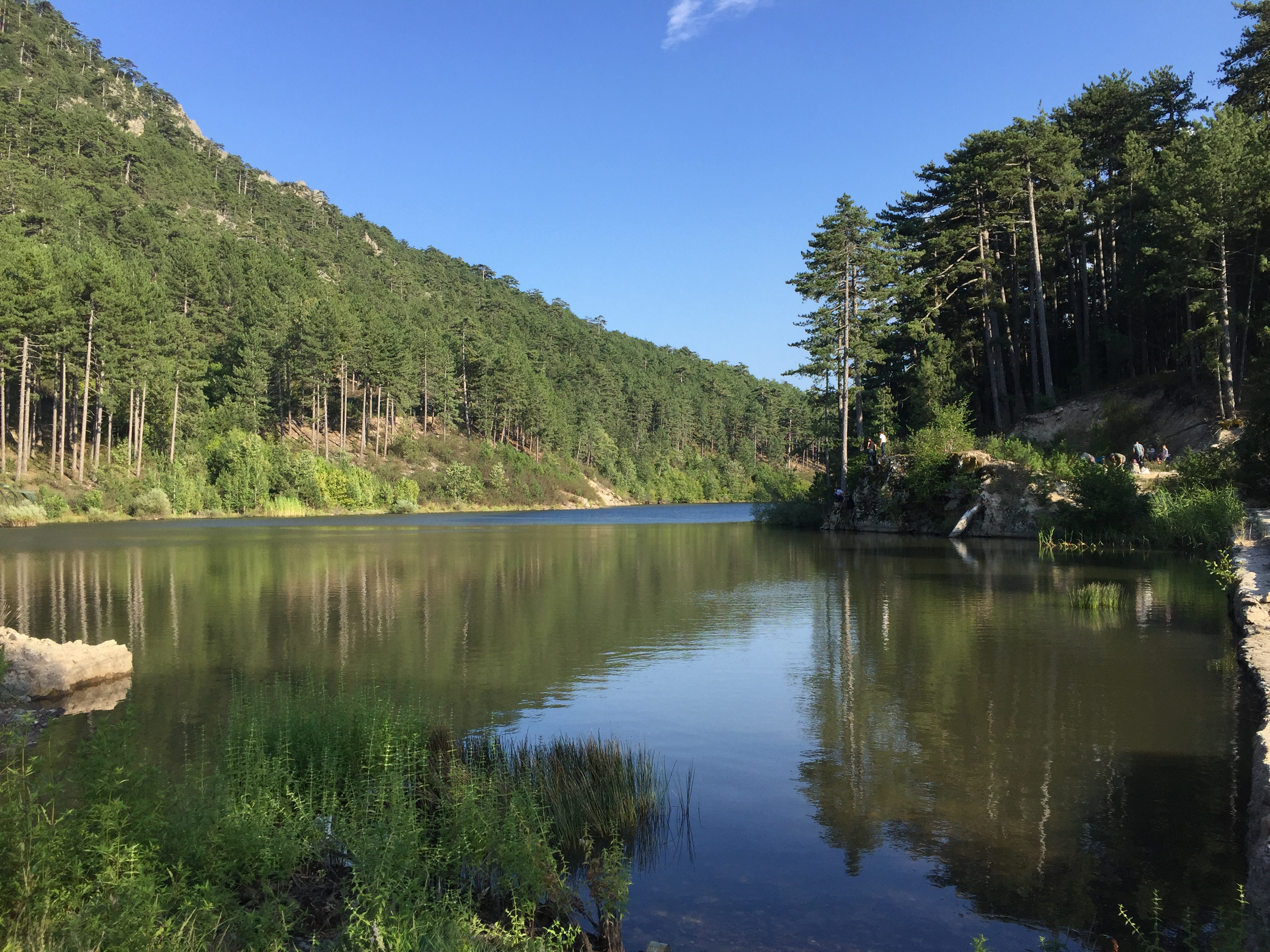

- Location within Turkey Location within Marmara
- Coordinates: 39°19′N 28°35′E
- Country: Turkey
- Province: Balıkesir
- District: Sındırgı
- Population (2022): 308
- Time zone: UTC+3 (TRT)

Kürendere is a neighbourhood in the municipality and district of Sındırgı, Balıkesir Province in Turkey. Its population is 308 (2022).
