= Kocakonak, Sındırgı =

Village in Turkey

Kocakonak
- Neighbourhood
- Location in Turkey Kocakonak (Marmara)
- Coordinates: 39°14′13″N 28°9′22″E
- Country: Turkey
- Province: Balıkesir
- District: Sındırgı
- Population (2022): 1,306
- Time zone: UTC+3 (TRT)

Kocakonak is a neighbourhood in the municipality and district of Sındırgı, Balıkesir Province in Turkey. Its population is 1,306 (2022).
