= Süller =

Süller can refer to:

- Süller, Çal
- Süller, Sındırgı
