= Yaylacık, Sındırgı =

Village in Turkey

Yaylacık
- Neighbourhood
- Location in Turkey Yaylacık (Marmara)
- Coordinates: 39°12′29″N 28°10′16″E
- Country: Turkey
- Province: Balıkesir
- District: Sındırgı
- Population (2022): 171
- Time zone: UTC+3 (TRT)

Yaylacık is a neighbourhood in the municipality and district of Sındırgı, Balıkesir Province in Turkey. Its population is 171 (2022).
