= Çılbırcı, Sındırgı =

Village in Turkey

Çılbırcı
- Neighbourhood
- Location in Turkey Çılbırcı (Marmara)
- Coordinates: 39°13′15″N 28°30′03″E
- Country: Turkey
- Province: Balıkesir
- District: Sındırgı
- Population (2022): 106
- Time zone: UTC+3 (TRT)

Çılbırcı is a neighbourhood in the municipality and district of Sındırgı, Balıkesir Province in Turkey. Its population is 106 (2022).
