= Osmanlar, Sındırgı =

Village in Turkey

Osmanlar
- Neighbourhood
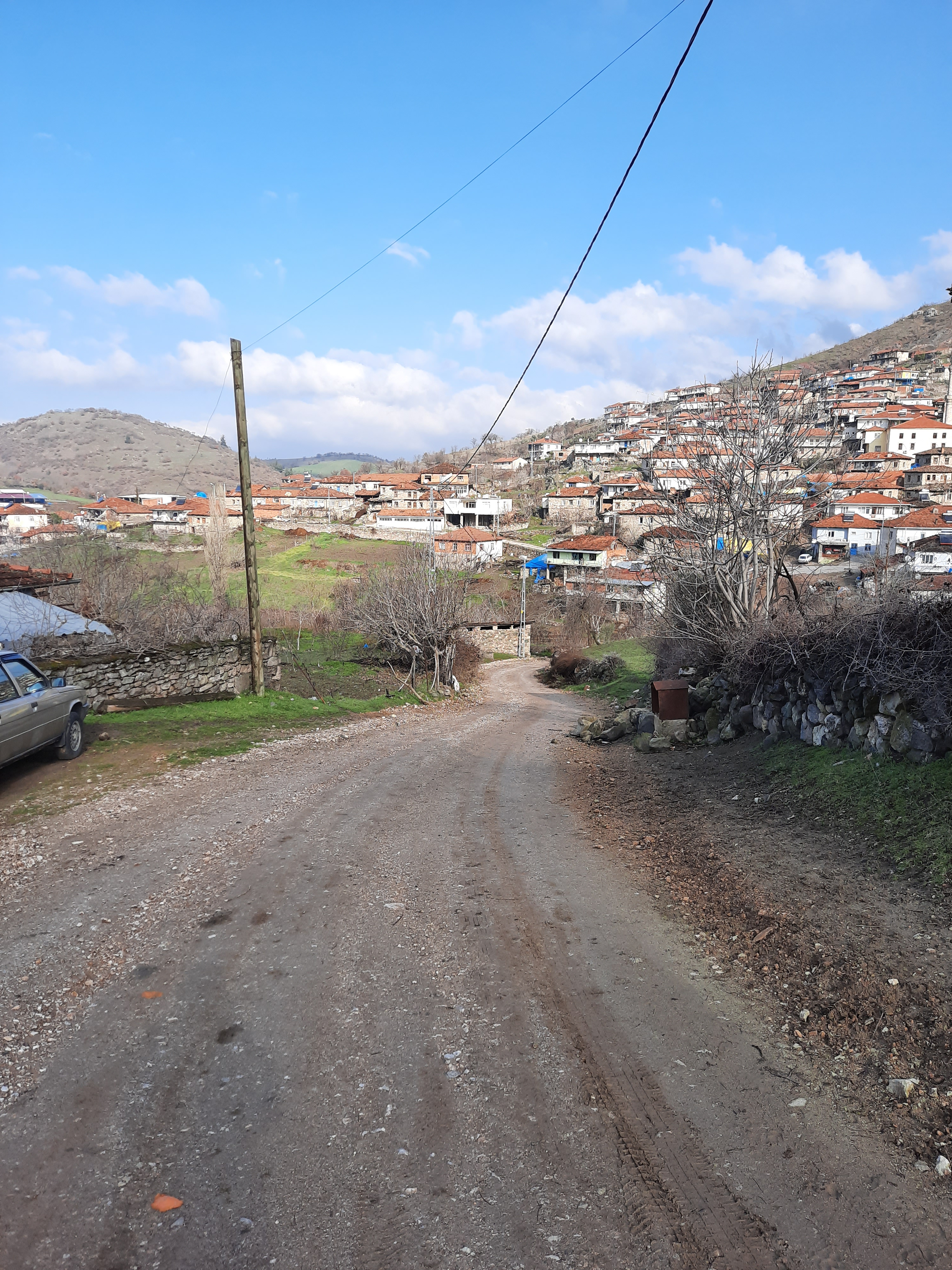

- Location within Turkey Location within Marmara
- Country: Turkey
- Province: Balıkesir
- District: Sındırgı
- Population (2022): 586
- Time zone: UTC+3 (TRT)

Osmanlar is a neighbourhood in the municipality and district of Sındırgı, Balıkesir Province in Turkey. Its population is 586 as of the 2022 census.
