= Kepez, Sındırgı =

Village in Turkey

Kepez
- Neighbourhood
- Country: Turkey
- Province: Balıkesir
- District: Sındırgı
- Population (2022): 142
- Time zone: UTC+3 (TRT)

Kepez is a neighbourhood in the municipality and district of Sındırgı, Balıkesir Province in Turkey. Its population is 142 (2022).
