= Şahinkaya, Sındırgı =

Village in Turkey

Şahinkaya
- Neighbourhood
- Country: Turkey
- Province: Balıkesir
- District: Sındırgı
- Population (2022): 148
- Time zone: UTC+3 (TRT)

Şahinkaya is a neighbourhood in the municipality and district of Sındırgı, Balıkesir Province in Turkey. Its population is 148 (2022).
