= Izz al-Din (disambiguation) =

Izz al-Din is an Arabic-language masculine given name and surname.

Izz al-Din can also refer to:

- Izz al-Din, Syria, a village in between Hama and Homs
- Izzeddin Fortress, Crete
- İzzettin, Sındırgı, Turkey
