= Bayraklı, Sındırgı =

Village in Turkey

Bayraklı
- Neighbourhood
- Location in Turkey Bayraklı (Marmara)
- Coordinates: 39.1537°N 28.2414°E
- Country: Turkey
- Province: Balıkesir
- District: Sındırgı
- Population (2022): 139
- Time zone: UTC+3 (TRT)

Bayraklı is a neighbourhood in the municipality and district of Sındırgı, Balıkesir Province in Turkey. Its population is 139 (2022).
