= Danaçayırı, Sındırgı =

Village in Turkey

Danaçayırı
- Neighbourhood
- Location in Turkey Danaçayırı (Marmara)
- Coordinates: 39°15′N 28°15′E
- Country: Turkey
- Province: Balıkesir
- District: Sındırgı
- Population (2022): 52
- Time zone: UTC+3 (TRT)

Danaçayırı is a neighbourhood in the municipality and district of Sındırgı, Balıkesir Province in Turkey. Its population is 52 (2022).
