= Bükrecik, Sındırgı =

Village in Turkey

Bükrecik
- Neighbourhood
- Location in Turkey Bükrecik (Marmara)
- Coordinates: 39.2633°N 27.9454°E
- Country: Turkey
- Province: Balıkesir
- District: Sındırgı
- Population (2022): 107
- Time zone: UTC+3 (TRT)

Bükrecik is a neighbourhood in the municipality and district of Sındırgı, Balıkesir Province in Turkey. Its population is 107 (2022).
