= Bulak, Sındırgı =

Village in Turkey

Bulak
- Neighbourhood
- Location in Turkey Bulak (Marmara)
- Coordinates: 39.1698°N 28.5042°E
- Country: Turkey
- Province: Balıkesir
- District: Sındırgı
- Population (2022): 101
- Time zone: UTC+3 (TRT)

Bulak is a neighbourhood in the municipality and district of Sındırgı, Balıkesir Province in Turkey. Its population is 101 (2022).
