= Aktaş, Sındırgı =

Village in Turkey

Aktaş
- Neighbourhood
- Location in Turkey Aktaş (Marmara)
- Coordinates: 39.1615°N 28.1921°E
- Country: Turkey
- Province: Balıkesir
- District: Sındırgı
- Population (2022): 116
- Time zone: UTC+3 (TRT)

Aktaş is a neighbourhood in the municipality and district of Sındırgı, Balıkesir Province in Turkey. Its population is 116 (2022).
