= Çamalanı, Sındırgı =

Village in Turkey

Çamalanı
- Neighbourhood
- Location in Turkey Çamalanı (Marmara)
- Coordinates: 39°15′26″N 28°29′35″E
- Country: Turkey
- Province: Balıkesir
- District: Sındırgı
- Population (2022): 285
- Time zone: UTC+3 (TRT)

Çamalanı is a neighbourhood in the municipality and district of Sındırgı, Balıkesir Province in Turkey. Its population is 285 (2022).
