= Kertil, Sındırgı =

Village in Turkey

Kertil
- Neighbourhood
- Country: Turkey
- Province: Balıkesir
- District: Sındırgı
- Population (2022): 134
- Time zone: UTC+3 (TRT)

Kertil is a neighbourhood in the municipality and district of Sındırgı, Balıkesir Province in Turkey. Its population is 134 (2022).
