= Vayxır, Sharur =

Vayxır
- Municipality
- Location within Azerbaijan
- Coordinates: 39°28′17″N 45°00′13″E
- Country: Azerbaijan
- Autonomous republic: Nakhchivan
- District: Sharur

Population (2005)
  - Total: 939
- Time zone: UTC+4 (AZT)

Vayxır (also, Vaikhir and Vaykhyr) is a village and municipality in the Sharur District of Nakhchivan, Azerbaijan. It is located 12 km in the south from the district center, on the plain. Its population is busy with farming and animal husbandry. All its public buildings joint with the village of Tumaslı. It has a population of 939.

== Etymology ==
The name of the village is related with the settlement named the köhnə Vayxır (Old Vaykhyr) which remains the ruins near the Vayxır village of Babek region.
