= Derecikören, Sındırgı =

Village in Turkey

Derecikören
- Neighbourhood
- Country: Turkey
- Province: Balıkesir
- District: Sındırgı
- Population (2022): 263
- Time zone: UTC+3 (TRT)

Derecikören is a neighbourhood in the municipality and district of Sındırgı, Balıkesir Province in Turkey. Its population is 263 (2022).
