= Düğüncüler, Sındırgı =

Village in Turkey

Düğüncüler
- Neighbourhood
- Location in Turkey Düğüncüler (Marmara)
- Coordinates: 39.2598°N 28.5354°E
- Country: Turkey
- Province: Balıkesir
- District: Sındırgı
- Population (2022): 207
- Time zone: UTC+3 (TRT)

Düğüncüler is a neighbourhood in the municipality and district of Sındırgı, Balıkesir Province in Turkey. Its population is 207 (2022).
