= Kızılgür, Sındırgı =

Village in Turkey

Kızılgür
- Neighbourhood
- Location in Turkey Kızılgür (Marmara)
- Coordinates: 39°15′32″N 28°01′57″E
- Country: Turkey
- Province: Balıkesir
- District: Sındırgı
- Population (2022): 126
- Time zone: UTC+3 (TRT)

Kızılgür is a neighbourhood in the municipality and district of Sındırgı, Balıkesir Province in Turkey. Its population is 126 (2022).
