= Aslandede, Sındırgı =

Village in Turkey

Aslandede
- Neighbourhood
- Location in Turkey Aslandede (Marmara)
- Coordinates: 39°13′N 28°18′E
- Country: Turkey
- Province: Balıkesir
- District: Sındırgı
- Population (2022): 272
- Time zone: UTC+3 (TRT)

Aslandede is a neighbourhood in the municipality and district of Sındırgı, Balıkesir Province in Turkey. Its population is 272 (2022).
