= Alakır, Sındırgı =

Village in Turkey

Alakır
- Neighbourhood
- Location in Turkey Alakır (Marmara)
- Coordinates: 39.2393°N 28.0513°E
- Country: Turkey
- Province: Balıkesir
- District: Sındırgı
- Population (2022): 206
- Time zone: UTC+3 (TRT)

Alakır is a neighbourhood in the municipality and district of Sındırgı, Balıkesir Province in Turkey. Its population is 206 (2022).
