= Alayaka, Sındırgı =

Village in Turkey

Alayaka
- Neighbourhood
- Location in Turkey Alayaka (Marmara)
- Coordinates: 39°15′N 28°23′E
- Country: Turkey
- Province: Balıkesir
- District: Sındırgı
- Population (2022): 377
- Time zone: UTC+3 (TRT)

Alayaka is a neighbourhood in the municipality and district of Sındırgı, Balıkesir Province in Turkey. Its population is 377 (2022).
