= Alacaatlı, Sındırgı =

Village in Turkey

Alacaatlı
- Neighbourhood
- Location in Turkey Alacaatlı (Marmara)
- Coordinates: 39.2529°N 28.0623°E
- Country: Turkey
- Province: Balıkesir
- District: Sındırgı
- Population (2022): 408
- Time zone: UTC+3 (TRT)

Alacaatlı is a neighbourhood in the municipality and district of Sındırgı, Balıkesir Province in Turkey. Its population is 408 (2022).
