= Çoturtepe, Sındırgı =

Village in Turkey

Çoturtepe
- Neighbourhood
- Location in Turkey Çoturtepe (Marmara)
- Coordinates: 39°17′N 28°17′E
- Country: Turkey
- Province: Balıkesir
- District: Sındırgı
- Population (2022): 133
- Time zone: UTC+3 (TRT)

Çoturtepe is a neighbourhood in the municipality and district of Sındırgı, Balıkesir Province in Turkey. Its population is 133 (2022).
