= Yolcupınar, Sındırgı =

Village in Turkey

Yolcupınar
- Neighbourhood
- Country: Turkey
- Province: Balıkesir
- District: Sındırgı
- Population (2022): 106
- Time zone: UTC+3 (TRT)

Yolcupınar is a neighbourhood in the municipality and district of Sındırgı, Balıkesir Province in Turkey. Its population is 106 (2022).
