= Pürsünler, Sındırgı =

Village in Turkey

Pürsünler
- Neighbourhood
- Location in Turkey Pürsünler (Marmara)
- Coordinates: 39°14′N 28°12′E
- Country: Turkey
- Province: Balıkesir
- District: Sındırgı
- Population (2022): 282
- Time zone: UTC+3 (TRT)

Pürsünler is a neighbourhood in the municipality and district of Sındırgı, Balıkesir Province in Turkey. Its population is 282 (2022).
