= Cüneyt, Sındırgı =

Village in Turkey

Cüneyt
- Neighbourhood
- Location in Turkey Cüneyt (Marmara)
- Coordinates: 39.2311°N 28.1140°E
- Country: Turkey
- Province: Balıkesir
- District: Sındırgı
- Population (2022): 123
- Time zone: UTC+3 (TRT)

Cüneyt (formerly: Bayırlı) is a neighbourhood in the municipality and district of Sındırgı, Balıkesir Province in Turkey. Its population is 123 (2022).
