= Sındırgı =

- District and municipality
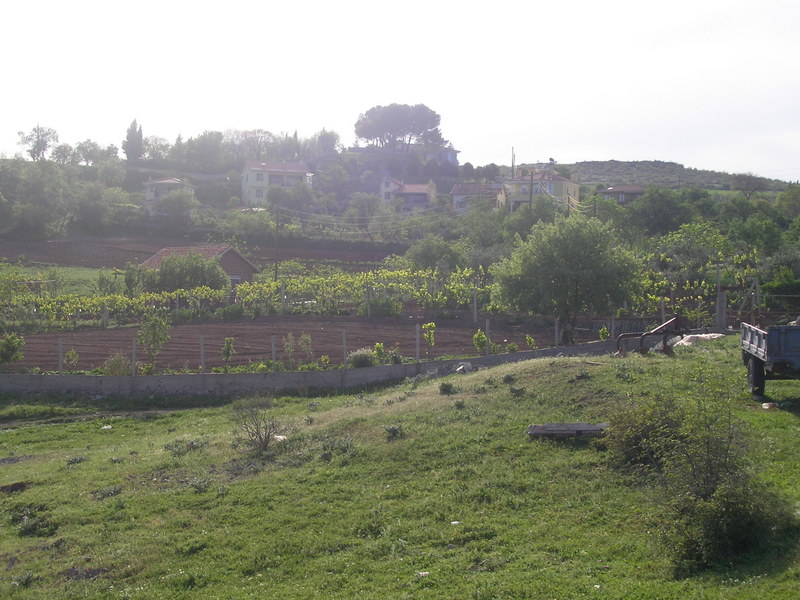
- Çaygören, Sındırgı

- Map showing Sındırgı District in Balıkesir Province

- Location within Turkey Location within Marmara
- Coordinates: 39°14′24″N 28°10′30″E
- Country: Turkey
- Province: Balıkesir

Government
  - Mayor: Serkan Sak (CHP)
- Area: 1,387 km^{2} (536 sq mi)
- Elevation: 230 m (750 ft)
- Population (2022): 32,408
  - Density: 23.37/km^{2} (60.52/sq mi)
- Time zone: UTC+3 (TRT)
- Postal code: 10330
- Area code: 0266
- Website: www.sindirgi.bel.tr

Sındırgı, formerly Koruköy and Carseae (Ancient Greek: Κάρσεαι), is a municipality and district of Balıkesir Province, Turkey. Its area is 1,387 km^{2}, and its population is 32,408 (2022). The mayor is Serkan Sak (CHP). A carpet festival is held in Sındırgı town in every fall season around September, and it is called International Yağcıbedir Festival. The province is also famous for its kolonya, a scented perfume used to freshen the hands.

== Composition ==
There are 75 neighbourhoods in Sındırgı District:

- Akçakısrak
- Aktaş
- Alacaatlı
- Alakır
- Alayaka
- Armutlu
- Aslandede
- Bayraklı
- Bükrecik
- Bulak
- Büyükdağdere
- Çakıllı
- Çaltılı
- Çamalanı
- Camicedit
- Camikebir
- Çavdaroğlu
- Çaygören
- Çayırköy
- Çelebiler
- Çıkrıkçı
- Çılbırcı
- Çoturtepe
- Cüneyt
- Danaçayırı
- Dedeler
- Derecikören
- Devletlibaba
- Düğüncüler
- Düvertepe
- Eğridere
- Emendere
- Eşmedere
- Gölcük
- Gözören
- Hisaralan
- İbiller
- Işıklar
- İzzettin
- Karaağaç
- Karacalar
- Karagür
- Karakaya
- Kepez
- Kertil
- Kınık
- Kıranköy
- Kızılgür
- Kocabey
- Kocakonak
- Kocasinan
- Kozlu
- Küçükbükü
- Küçükdağdere
- Kürendere
- Kurtuluş
- Mandıra
- Mumcuköy
- Ormaniçi
- Osmanlar
- Pelitören
- Pürsünler
- Rızaiye
- Şahinkaya
- Şapçı
- Sinandede
- Süller
- Taşköy
- Umurlar
- Yağcıbedir
- Yaylabayır
- Yaylacık
- Yolcupınar
- Yüreğil
- Yusufçamı
