= Küçükdağdere, Sındırgı =

Village in Turkey

Küçükdağdere
- Neighbourhood
- Location in Turkey Küçükdağdere (Marmara)
- Coordinates: 39°10′N 28°19′E
- Country: Turkey
- Province: Balıkesir
- District: Sındırgı
- Population (2022): 295
- Time zone: UTC+3 (TRT)

Küçükdağdere is a neighbourhood in the municipality and district of Sındırgı, Balıkesir Province in Turkey. Its population is 295 (2022).
