= Çaygören, Sındırgı =

Village in Turkey

Çaygören
- Neighbourhood
- Country: Turkey
- Province: Balıkesir
- District: Sındırgı
- Population (2022): 156
- Time zone: UTC+3 (TRT)

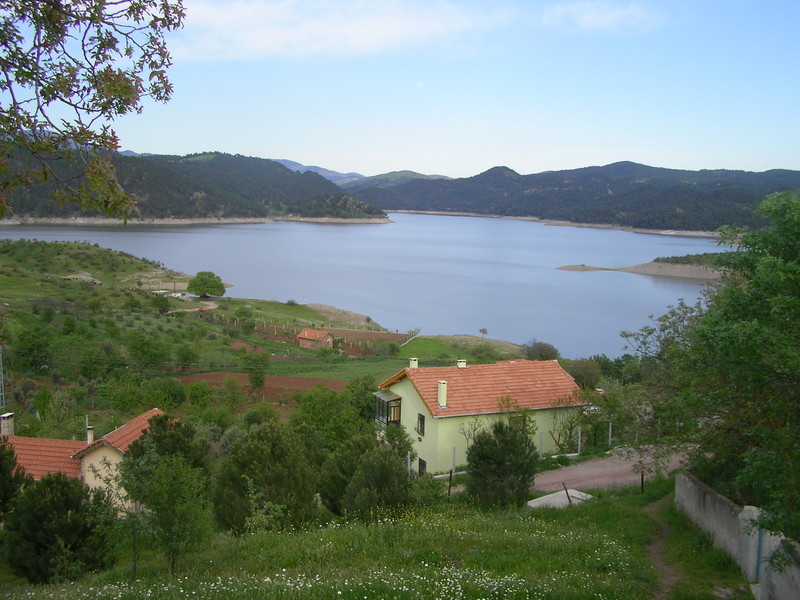
Çaygören

Çaygören is a neighbourhood in the municipality and district of Sındırgı, Balıkesir Province in Turkey. It has a population of 156 (as of 2022).
