= Büyükdağdere, Sındırgı =

Village in Turkey

Büyükdağdere
- Neighbourhood
- Location in Turkey Büyükdağdere (Marmara)
- Coordinates: 39°10′46″N 28°18′46″E
- Country: Turkey
- Province: Balıkesir
- District: Sındırgı
- Population (2022): 526
- Time zone: UTC+3 (TRT)

Büyükdağdere is a neighbourhood in the municipality and district of Sındırgı, Balıkesir Province in Turkey. Its population is 526 (2022).
