= Umurlar =

Umurlar can refer to the following villages in Turkey:

- Umurlar, Dursunbey
- Umurlar, Göynük
- Umurlar, Sındırgı
- Umurlar, Yenice
