= Çelebiler, Sındırgı =

Village in Turkey

Çelebiler
- Neighbourhood
- Country: Turkey
- Province: Balıkesir
- District: Sındırgı
- Population (2022): 160
- Time zone: UTC+3 (TRT)

Çelebiler is a neighbourhood in the municipality and district of Sındırgı, Balıkesir Province in Turkey. Its population is 160 (2022).
