= Chalabilar Mosque =

Former mosque in Jabrayil, Azerbaijan

- Azerbaijani: Çələbilər məscidi
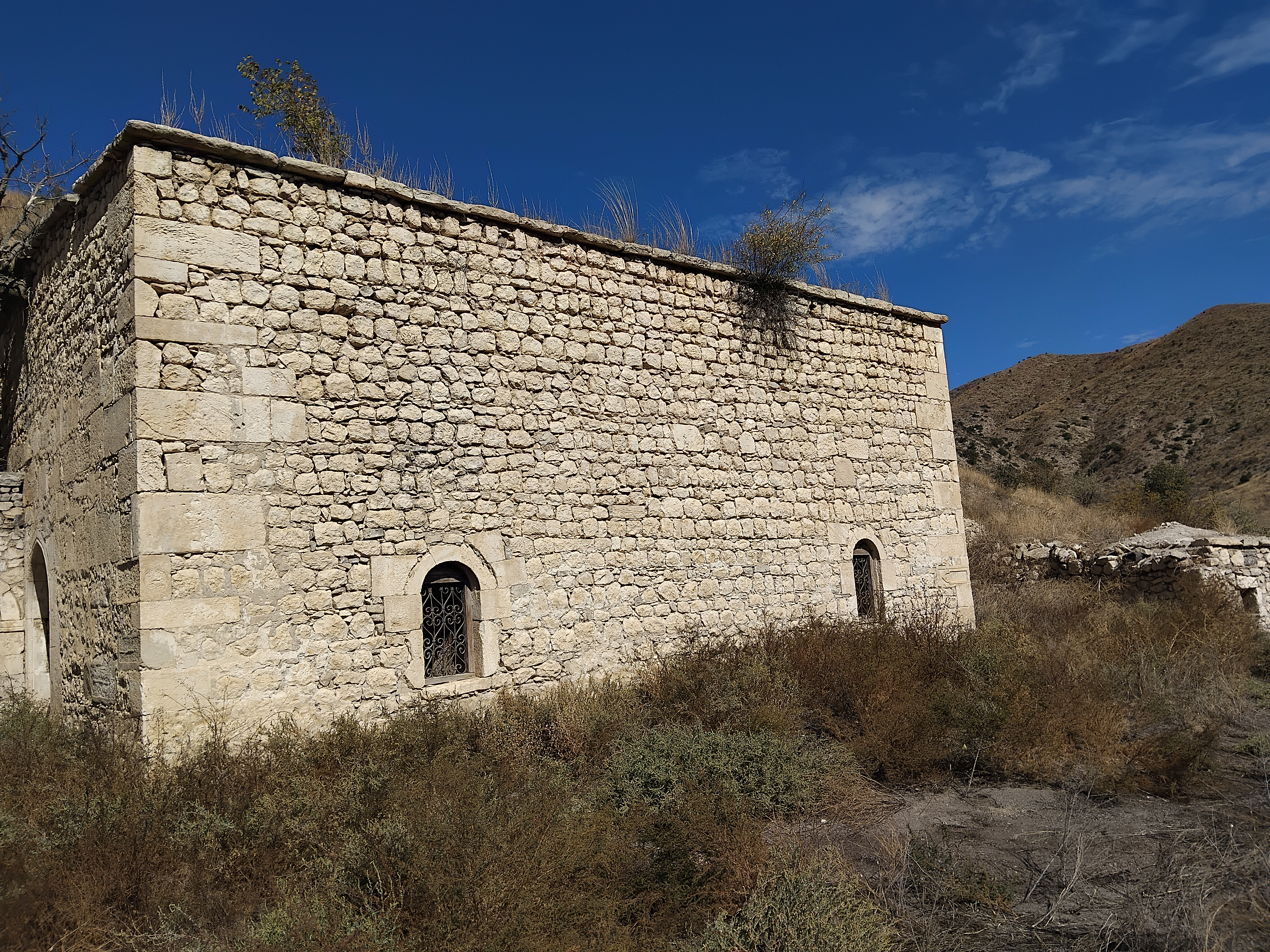
- Ruins of the former mosque in 2024

- Location of the former mosque in Azerbaijan

Religion
- Affiliation: Islam (former)
- Ecclesiastical or organizational status: Mosque (1678–1928); Profane use (c. 1930s–c. 1991); Mosque (c. 1991–1993)
- Status: Abandoned (ruinous state)

Location
- Location: Chalabilar village, Jabrayil District
- Country: Azerbaijan
- Interactive map of Chalabilar Mosque
- Coordinates: 39°23′19″N 46°49′38″E

Architecture
- Type: Mosque architecture
- Completed: 1678

The Chalabilar Mosque (Azerbaijani: Çələbilər məscidi) is a former mosque, now in ruins, and historical architectural monument, located in the village of Chalabilar in Jabrayil district of Azerbaijan. Completed in 1678, the former mosque was included in the list of local significant immovable historical and cultural monuments by decision No. 132 of the Cabinet of Ministers of the Republic of Azerbaijan on August 2, 2001.

The mosque was in active use until 1928, and was desecrated in 1993.

== History ==
The mosque was built in 1678 by Muhammad ibn Haji Garaman Ahmed. The mosque also served as a madrasa where both religious and secular subjects were taught. The Azerbaijani poet Molla Vali Vidadi, who lived in the 18th century, also taught at this madrasa.

Following the Soviet occupation of Azerbaijan, official anti-religious campaigns began in 1928. In December of that year, the Central Committee of the Communist Party of Azerbaijan transferred many mosques, churches, and synagogues to the balance of educational clubs for secular purposes. If there were approximately 3,000 mosques in Azerbaijan in 1917. By 1927, the number decreased to 1,700, and by 1933, it was reduced to 17. Chalabilar Mosque also ceased its activities after the Soviet occupation.

After Azerbaijan regained its independence, the mosque was included in the list of local significant immovable historical and cultural monuments by decision No. 132 of the Cabinet of Ministers of the Republic of Azerbaijan on August 2, 2001. After the occupation of Jabrayil district, the Chalabilar Mosque-Madrasa complex was restored and brought back to its original form. However, after the village of Chalabilar was occupied by the Armenian Armed Forces in 1993, the complex was burned and looted by Armenians, rendering the mosque building unusable. On October 26, 2020, the village was liberated from occupation by the Armed Forces of Azerbaijan.

== See also ==
- Islam in Azerbaijan
- List of mosques in Azerbaijan
- Khudafarin Bridges
