= Tuna Aktürk =

Turkish footballer (born 1977)

- Born: September 22, 1977 (age 48); Balıkesir, Turkey
- Education: Balıkesir University, Faculty of Engineering and Architecture
- Occupation: Civil engineer
- Known for: Balıkesirspor President; Balıkesir Mayority Vice-Mayor

Tuna Aktürk (born 22 September 1977 in Balıkesir) is Balıkesir Vice-Mayor and Balıkesirspor President. He has a degree in civil engineering from Balıkesir University, Faculty of Engineering and Architecture.

He is the largest shareholder and board member of Veta Yapi Construction Company .
