= Bandırma Onyedi Eylül University =

Public university in Bandırma, Balıkesir, Turkey

Coordinates: 40.3374°N 27.9360°E

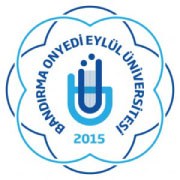
- Motto: "The Bridge Opening to Future" (Turkish: Geleceğe Açılan Köprü)
- Type: Public
- Established: 2015
- Rector: Prof. Dr. İsmail BOZ
- Administrative staff: 377
- Students: 11475 (with postgrads)
- Location: Bandırma, Balıkesir Province, Turkey
- Campus: Bandırma, Erdek, Gönen, Manyas
- Website: www.bandirma.edu.tr

Bandırma Onyedi Eylül University is a state university established in 2015 in Bandırma, Balıkesir, Turkey.

== History ==
The roots of Bandırma University date back to the Bandırma Faculty of Economics and Administrative Science of Balıkesir University, established in 1993. After the legal establishment of Bandırma Onyedi Eylül University in 2015, the Faculties of Economics and Administrative Sciences, Maritime Studies, Health Sciences in Bandırma, the Gönen Geothermic Institute and the vocational schools in Bandırma, Erdek, Manyas and Gönen were transferred from Balıkesir University to the Bandırma 17 Eylül University. Additionally, the Faculty of Agriculture, Ömer Seyfettin Faculty of Applied Sciences, The School of Foreign Languages, Institutes of Social Science, Science and Health Sciences were newly founded

== Academic Units ==
=== Faculties ===
- Faculty of Economics and Administrative Sciences
- Maritime Faculty
- Ömer Seyfettin Faculty of Applied Sciences
- Faculty of Health Sciences
- Faculty of Engineering and Natural Sciences
- Faculty of Humanities and Social Sciences
- Faculty of Sport Sciences
- Faculty of Medicine
- Faculty of Architecture and Design
- Faculty of Islamic Sciences

=== Institutes ===
- Gönen Geothermic Institute
- Institute of Social Sciences
- Institute of Science and Technology
- Institute of Health Sciences

=== School of Foreign Languages ===
- School of Foreign Languages

=== Vocational Schools ===
- Bandırma Vocational School of Justice
- Bandırma Vocational School
- Vocational School of Health Services
- Erdek Vocational School
- Gönen Vocational School
- Manyas Vocational School
- Susurluk Vocational School
- Bandırma OSB Technical Vocational School

== Rector ==
Prof. Dr. Süleyman ÖZDEMİR, among the candidates recommended by the Council of Higher Education (Turkey), has been appointed as the Rector of Bandırma Onyedi Eylül University, according to Article 13 of the Constitution of the Republic of Turkey and Article 13 of the Law on Higher Education No. 2547.
