= Dağ Tumas =

Dagh Tumas
- Azerbaijani: Dağ Tumas
- Location within Azerbaijan
- Coordinates: 39°23′27.3″N 46°42′21.8″E
- Country: Azerbaijan
- District: Jabrayil
- Time zone: UTC+4 (AZT)

Dagh Tumas (Azerbaijani: Dağ Tumas) is a village in the administrative unit with the same name of Jabrayil District of Azerbaijan, located on the southwestern slopes of Karabakh ridge, 23 km to the west of Jabrayil city.

== Toponym ==
The village was initially called Tumas. Later, families from the village founded the villages of Tumasly (nowadays in Barda district) and Chaytumas (nowadays in Gubadly district), and in order to distinguish this village from the newly formed ones, the village of Tumas, located on mountain slopes, began to be called Dagh Tumas (montane Tumas).

== History ==
During the years of the Russian Empire, the village of Tumasly was part of the Jabrayil district, the Elizavetpol province.

After Soviet occupation, the village was part of the village council of the same name in the Jabrayil district of Azerbaijan SSR. The village had a secondary, eighth-grade and primary schools, a library and a hospital.

As an aftermath of the Karabakh War in August 1993, It was occupied by the Armenian forces in 1993.

On 23 October 2020, was announced the liberation by Azerbaijani Army of the village of Dagh Tumas.

== Population ==
According to the “Code of statistical data of the Transcaucasian region population, extracted from the family lists of 1886,” in the village of Tumasly, Tumasly rural district, Jabrayil district, there were 119 dym and lived 506 Azerbaijanis (listed as “Tatars”), who were Sunnis by religion, 17 of them were representatives of the clergy, the rest were peasants

According to the “Caucasian Calendar” for 1910, in the village of Tumas, Karyagin district, in 1907 here lived 599 people, most were Azerbaijanis, indicated in the calendar as “Tatars”.

According to the publication “Administrative Division of the ASSR”, prepared in 1933 by the Department of National Economic Accounting of the Azerbaijan SSR (AzNEA), as of 1 January 1933, in the village of Dagh Tumas, which was part of Dagh Tumas village council of the Jabrayil district of Azerbaijan SSR, there were 106 farms and 529 inhabitants. The entire population of the village council were Azerbaijanis (in the source listed as “Turks”).

In 1977, 919 people lived in the village. The village population was engaged in livestock farming, wheat cultivation, viticulture and sericulture

== See also ==
- Bashikesik Dome
