= Çələbilər, Jabrayil =

Chalabilar
- Azerbaijani: Çələbilər
- Location within Azerbaijan
- Coordinates: 39°23′15.2″N 46°49′42.1″E
- Country: Azerbaijan
- District: Jabrayil
- Time zone: UTC+4 (AZT)
  - Summer (DST): UTC+5 (AZT)

Çələbilər (also, Chalabilar) is the ruins of a village that is located 17 km west of the city of Jabrayil, within the Dagh Tumas administrative-territorial unit, Jabrayil District, Azerbaijan.

== Toponym ==
According to the "Encyclopaedic Dictionary of Toponyms of Azerbaijan", the name of the village is linked with the generations of families that founded it, known as chalabi (head of the Mevlevi Sufi order).

== History ==
During the Russian Empire years, the village of Chalabilar was part of Jabrayil District, Elizavetpol province. According to the “Code of statistical data of the Transcaucasian region population, extracted from the family lists of 1886”, in the village of Chalabilar, Tumasli rural district, Jabrayil district, there were 7 dym where lived 59 Azerbaijanis (listed as “Tatars”), who were Sunni by religion, 31 of them were representatives of the clergy, the rest were peasants.

During the Soviet years, the village was part of Jabrayil District, Azerbaijan SSR. The village of Chalabilar was registered as part of Dagh Tumas village council of the district in 1933. The entire population of the village council at that time was formed by Azerbaijanis (in the source - “Turks”). At this time, there were 19 farms in the village and 121 residents.

The village was captured by Armenian forces in the First Karabakh War and was destroyed.

On 6 October 2020, Azerbaijani President Ilham Aliyev declared that Chalabilar village was liberated and came under the control of the Azerbaijani Armed forces.

== See also ==
- Chalabilar Mosque
