= İzzettin, Sındırgı =

Village in Turkey

İzzettin
- Neighbourhood
- Location in Turkey İzzettin (Marmara)
- Coordinates: 39°11′31″N 28°34′37″E
- Country: Turkey
- Province: Balıkesir
- District: Sındırgı
- Population (2022): 269
- Time zone: UTC+3 (TRT)

İzzettin is a neighbourhood in the municipality and district of Sındırgı, Balıkesir Province in Turkey. Its population is 269 (2022).
