= Çələbilər, Barda =

Çələbilər
- Municipality
- Location within Azerbaijan Location within Karabakh Economic Region
- Coordinates: 40°24′41″N 47°18′33″E
- Country: Azerbaijan
- Rayon: Barda

Population
  - Total: 758
- Time zone: UTC+4 (AZT)
  - Summer (DST): UTC+5 (AZT)

Çələbilər (also, Chelabilar and Chelyabilyar) is a village and municipality in the Barda Rayon of Azerbaijan. It has a population of 758.
