= Balıkesir University =

Public university in Balıkesir, Turkey

Coordinates: 39.541039°N 28.008690°E

- Balıkesir Üniversitesi
- Motto: Köklü geçmiş, güçlü gelecek
- Motto in English: Rooted past, strong future
- Type: Public
- Established: 1910 / 1992
- Affiliations: Erasmus
- Rector: Prof. Dr. Yücel Oğurlu
- Students: 26,782
- Location: Balıkesir, Turkey
- Website: balikesir.edu.tr

University rankings

Regional – Overall
- QS Emerging Europe and Central Asia: 351-400 (2022)

Balıkesir University (Turkish: Balıkesir Üniversitesi) is a public university in Balıkesir, Turkey. It was established in 1992.

== History ==
The roots of Balikesir University date back to Karesi Teacher Training School, which was established in 1910. Balikesir State Engineering Academy, Balikesir Management and Tourism Vocational School and Balikesir Vocational School started educational facilities in 1975-1976 and this marked an important step for the establishment of the university. These establishments changed their names and status and they were made to continue their educational facilities under the name of Uludag University in 1982 with the decree law numbered 41. Necati Education Institute became a four-year “High Teacher Training School” in 1981 and then in 1982, this institution was renamed Necatibey Education Faculty.

In the same way, the name of Balikesir Business Administration and Hotel Management Vocational School was changed as Balikesir School of Tourism and Hotel Management and the name of two–year Balikesir Vocational School remained the same. These institutions, which operated under the name of Uludağ University for ten years, have established a firm infrastructure for Balikesir University through a healthy and stable development. Balikesir University was established in accordance with the law dated 11 June 1992, numbered 3837 published in official journal numbered 21281. Since January 1, 1993, Balikesir University has maintained its activities.

After the legal establishment of Bandırma Onyedi Eylül University in 2015, the Faculties of Economics and Administrative Sciences, Maritime Studies, Health Sciences in Bandırma, the Gönen Geothermic Institute and the vocational schools in Bandırma, Erdek, Manyas and Gönen were transferred from Balıkesir University to the Bandırma 17 Eylül University.

== Academic Awards ==
The paper titled “A Comparative Analysis of Designing Gastronomic Experiences With Artificial Intelligence”, presented by Balıkesir University academics and students, received the Best Paper Award at the 12th International CEO Social Sciences Congress, held on 6–7 December 2025 in Karachi, Pakistan.

== Campuses ==
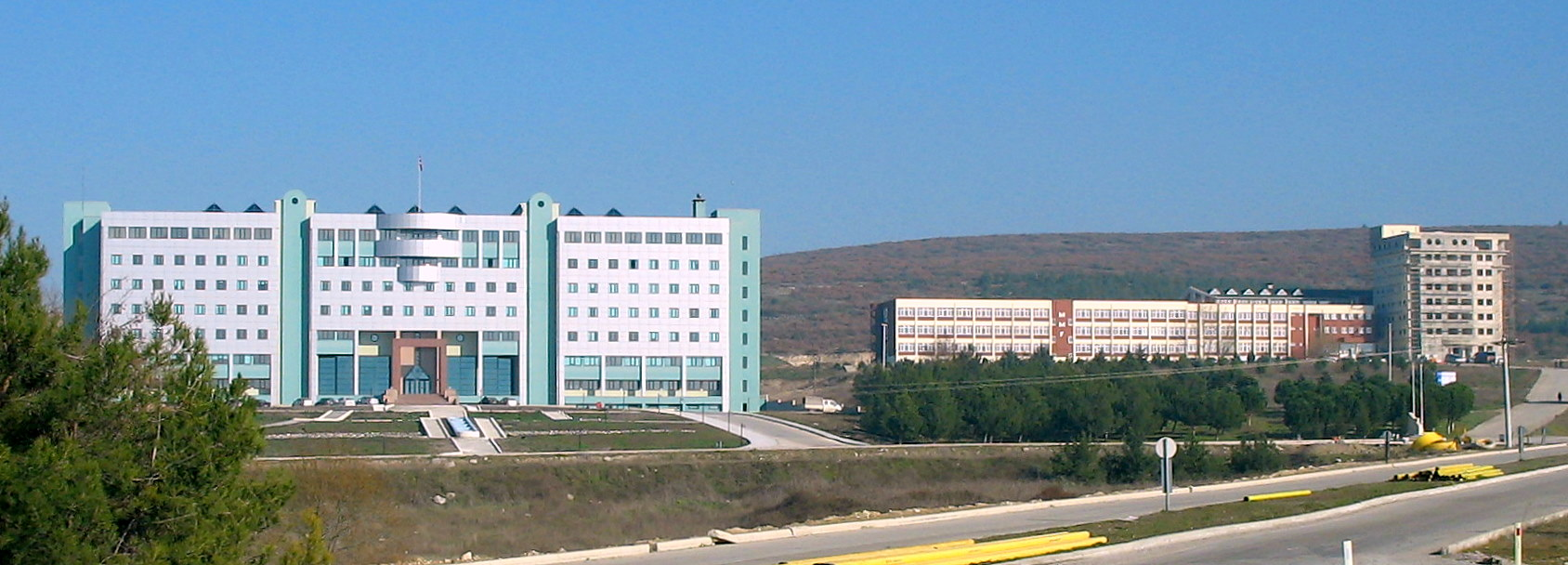
Çağış Campus

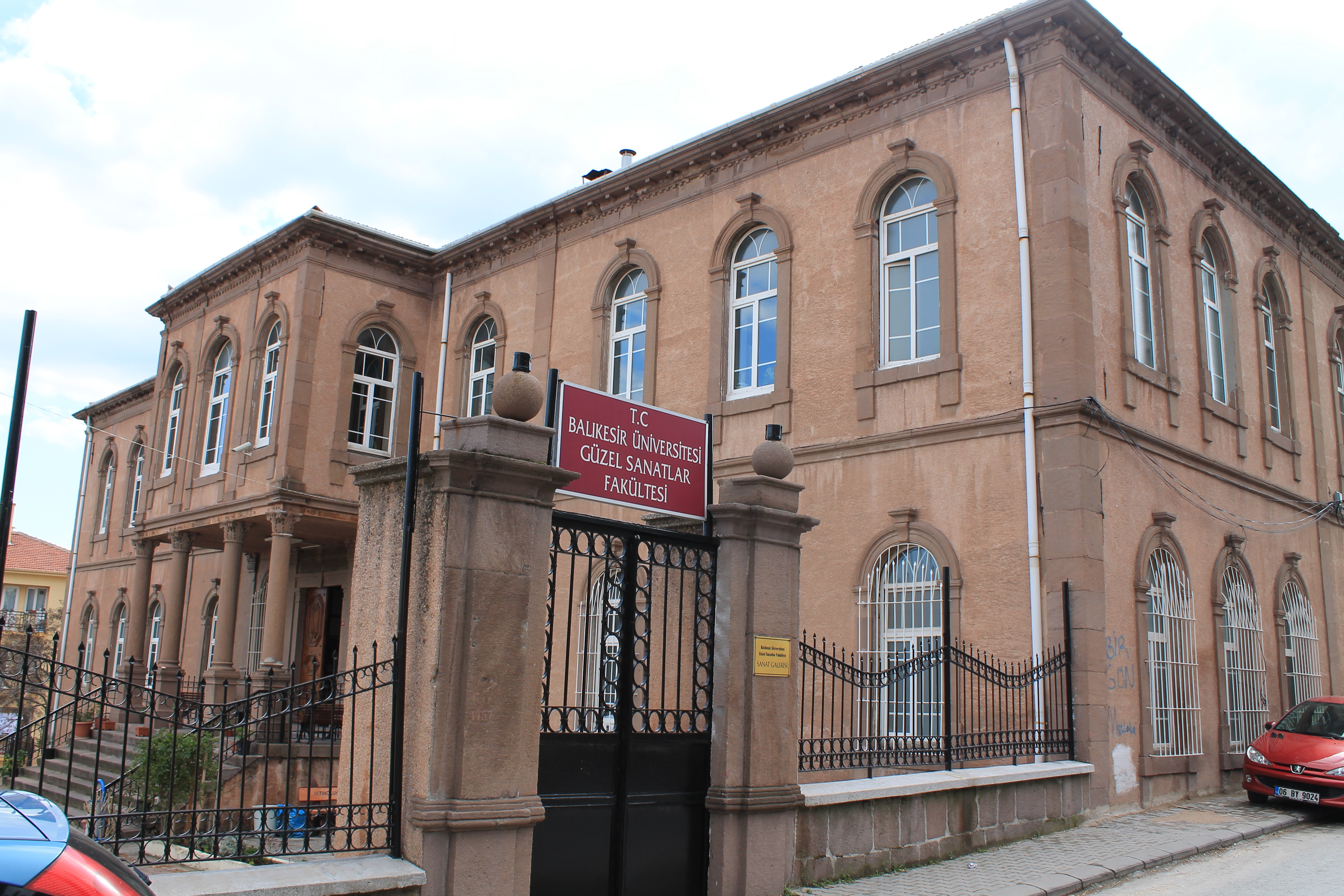
Faculty of Fine Arts

=== Çağış Campus ===
The units listed below are on the main Çağış Campus on the outskirts of the city. Buses and minibuses provide regular services to Çağış Campus from the city center between the hours 07:00 and 23:00.

- Rectorate building, with administrative departments
- Faculty of Engineering
- Faculty of Architecture
- Faculty of Science and Letters
- Faculty of Tourism
- Faculty of Medicine
- Faculty of Veterinary Medicine
- Faculty of Law
- Faculty of Economics and Administrative Sciences
- Balıkesir Vocational School
- Central Library
- Main Sports Hall
- Graduate School of Science and Technology
- Graduate School of Social Sciences
- Graduate School of Health Sciences

=== NEF Campus ===
NEF Campus, in the center of the town, was the original site of the university. These units are on this campus:

- Necatibey Faculty of Education
- Faculty of Sports Sciences
- NEF Conference Hall
- Halil İnalcık Conference Hall
- Sports Hall
- University Fitness Center
- Outdoor sports facilities
- Continuing Education Center (BAUSEM)

== Academic Units ==
=== Faculties ===
Balıkesir University comprises 14 faculties:

- Burhaniye Faculty of Applied Sciences (Burhaniye Uygulamalı Bilimler Fakültesi)
- Faculty of Science and Letters (Fen-Edebiyat Fakültesi)
- Faculty of Fine Arts (Güzel Sanatlar Fakültesi)
- Faculty of Law (Hukuk Fakültesi)
- Faculty of Economics and Administrative Sciences (İktisadi ve İdari Bilimler Fakültesi)
- Faculty of Theology (İlahiyat Fakültesi)
- Faculty of Architecture (Mimarlık Fakültesi)
- Faculty of Engineering (Mühendislik Fakültesi)
- Necatibey Faculty of Education (Necatibey Eğitim Fakültesi)
- Faculty of Health Sciences (Sağlık Bilimleri Fakültesi)
- Faculty of Sports Sciences (Spor Bilimleri Fakültesi)
- Faculty of Medicine (Tıp Fakültesi)
- Faculty of Tourism (Turizm Fakültesi)
- Faculty of Veterinary Medicine (Veteriner Fakültesi)

=== Graduate Institutes ===
- Edremit Olive Research Institute (Edremit Zeytincilik Enstitüsü)
- Institute of Science and Technology (Fen Bilimleri Enstitüsü)
- Institute of Health Sciences (Sağlık Bilimleri Enstitüsü)
- Institute of Social Sciences (Sosyal Bilimleri Enstitüsü)

=== Schools ===
- Edremit School of Civil Aviation (Edremit Sivil Havacılık Yüksekokulu)
- School of Foreign Languages (Yabancı Diller Yüksekokulu)

=== Vocational Schools ===
- Altınoluk Vocational School
- Ayvalık Vocational School
- Balıkesir Vocational School
- Bigadiç Vocational School
- Burhaniye Vocational School
- Dursunbey Vocational School
- Edremit Vocational School
- Havran Vocational School
- İvrindi Health Services Vocational School
- Kepsut Vocational School
- Savaştepe Vocational School
- Sındırgı Vocational School
- Susurluk Agriculture and Forestry Vocational School

== Rectors ==
- 1992–1994: Prof. Dr. Asım Yücel
- 1994–1998: Prof. Dr. Aydın Okcu
- 1998–2006: Prof. Dr. Necdet Hacıoğlu
- 2006–2010: Prof. Dr. Şerif Saylan
- 2010–2014: Prof. Dr. Mahir Alkan
- 2014–2018: Prof. Dr. Kerim Özdemir
- 2018–2023: Prof. Dr. İlter Kuş
- 2023–present: Prof. Dr. Yücel Oğurlu

== Student Societies ==
Balıkesir University hosts active student societies covering cultural, scientific, artistic, sports, and social responsibility fields, with a total membership exceeding 11,500 students.

| Society Name (English) | Original Name (Turkish) | Active Members |
|---|---|---|
| Aikido Society | AİKİDO TOPLULUĞU | 128 |
| Academic Law Society | AKADEMİK HUKUK TOPLULUĞU | 231 |
| Mind and Intelligence Games Society | AKIL ve ZEKA OYUNLARI TOPLULUĞU | 379 |
| Anatomy Society | ANATOMİ TOPLULUĞU | 126 |
| Kemalist Thought Society | ATATÜRKÇÜ DÜŞÜNCE TOPLULUĞU | 266 |
| European Medical Students' Association (EMSA) | AVRUPA TIP ÖĞR.BİRLİĞİ TOPLULUĞU | 20 |
| BAUN OBİDEV Society | BAUN OBİDEV TOPLULUĞU | 323 |
| Science, Social Solidarity and Synergy Society | BİLİM, TOPLUMSAL DAYANIŞMA ve SİNERJİ TOP. | 20 |
| Women in Science Society | BİLİMDE KADINLAR TOPLULUĞU | 109 |
| Cycling Society | BİSİKLET TOPLULUĞU | 187 |
| Stock Market and Investment Society | BORSA ve YATIRIM TOPLULUĞU | 184 |
| Children's Rights and Diplomacy Society | ÇOCUK HAKLARI VE DİPLOMASİ TOPLULUĞU | 138 |
| Design and Drama in Early Childhood Education Society | ÇOCUK EĞİTİMİNDE TASARIM VE DRAMA TOPLULUĞU | 20 |
| Mountaineering and Winter Sports Society | DAĞCILIK ve KIŞ SPORLARI TOPLULUĞU | 497 |
| Combatting Disinformation Society | DEZENFORMASYONLA MÜCADELE TOPLULUĞU | 20 |
| Literature, Books and Debate Society | EDEBİYAT, KİTAP ve MÜNAZARA TOPLULUĞU | 211 |
| Electrical and Computer Systems Society | ELEKTRİK, BİLGİSAYAR SİSTEMLERİ TOPLULUĞU | 307 |
| Industrial Sciences and Technology Society | ENDÜSTRİ BİLİMLERİ ve TEKNOLOJİ TOPLULUĞU | 104 |
| Early Childhood Education Society | ERKEN ÇOCUKLUK EĞİTİMİ TOPLULUĞU | 210 |
| Film Review and Production Society | FİLM İNCELEME ve YAPIM TOPLULUĞU | 25 |
| Physiotherapy and Rehabilitation Society | FİZYOTERAPİ ve REHABİLİTASYON TOPLULUĞU | 80 |
| Gastronomy Society | GASTRONOMİ TOPLULUĞU | 172 |
| Traditional and Complementary Medicine Society | GELENEKSEL ve TAMAMLAYICI TIP TOPLULUĞU | 27 |
| Future Educators Society | GELECEĞİN EĞİTİMCİLERİ TOPLULUĞU | 20 |
| Youth, Women and Family Society | GENÇLİK, KADIN ve AİLE TOPLULUĞU | 163 |
| Young Red Crescent Society | GENÇ KIZILAY TOPLULUĞU | 75 |
| Young TEMA Society | GENÇ TEMA TOPLULUĞU | 174 |
| Young Vision Society | GENÇ VİZYON TOPLULUĞU | 20 |
| Young Entrepreneurs Society | GENÇ GİRİŞİMCİLER TOPLULUĞU | 20 |
| Young Doctors of the World Society | GENÇ YERYÜZÜ DOKTORLARI TOPLULUĞU | 27 |
| Genetics Research Society | GENETİK ARAŞTIRMA TOPLULUĞU | 196 |
| Food Innovation and Technology Society | GIDA İNOVASYON ve TEKNOLOJİ TOPLULUĞU | 38 |
| Visual Arts Society | GÖRSEL SANATLAR TOPLULUĞU | 185 |
| Public Health Society | HALK SAĞLIĞI TOPLULUĞU | 0 |
| Folk Dance Society | HALKOYUNLARI TOPLULUĞU | 240 |
| Touching Lives Society | HAYATA DOKUNANLAR TOPLULUĞU | 20 |
| Animal and Nature Protection Society | HAYVANLARI VE DOĞAYI KORUMA TOPLULUĞU | 167 |
| Accessible Education for All Society | HERKES İÇİN ENGELSİZ EĞİTİM TOPLULUĞU | 196 |
| Sports for All Society | HERKES İÇİN SPOR TOPLULUĞU | 345 |
| Communication and Young Executives Society | İLETİŞİM VE GENÇ YÖNETİCİLER TOPLULUĞU | 145 |
| Knowledge and Civilization Society | İLİM ve MEDENİYET TOPLULUĞU | 70 |
| Scientific Discussion Society | İLMİ MÜZAKERE TOPLULUĞU | 58 |
| English Speaking Society | İNGİLİZCE KONUŞMA TOPLULUĞU | 158 |
| Humanity and Civilization Society | İNSANLIK VE MEDENİYET TOPLULUĞU | 20 |
| Innovation and Technology Society | İNOVASYON ve TEKNOLOJİ TOPLULUĞU | 52 |
| Future of Goodness Society | İYİLİĞİN GELECEĞİ TOPLULUĞU | 20 |
| Women and Life Society | KADIN ve YAŞAM TOPLULUĞU | 339 |
| Quality Ambassadors Society | KALİTE ELÇİLERİ TOPLULUĞU | 20 |
| American Football Society | KORUMALI FUTBOL TOPLULUĞU | 115 |
| Gulf Vocational Colleges Society | KÖRFEZ YÜKSEKOKULLAR TOPLULUĞU | 21 |
| Birdwatching and Nature Society | KUŞ GÖZLEM ve DOĞA TOPLULUĞU | 22 |
| Kuva-yi Milliye Society | KUVAYİ MİLLİYE TOPLULUĞU | 94 |
| Cultural Ambassadors Society | KÜLTÜR ELÇİLERİ TOPLULUĞU | 20 |
| Library Society | KÜTÜPHANE TOPLULUĞU | 373 |
| Latin Dances Society | LATİN DANSLARI TOPLULUĞU | 244 |
| LÖSEV Society | LÖSEV TOPLULUĞU | 143 |
| Spiritual and Psychological Counseling Society | MANEVİ-PSİKOLOJİK DANIŞMA TOPLULUĞU | 54 |
| Mathematics Society | MATEMATİK TOPLULUĞU | 45 |
| National Revival Society | MİLLİ DİRİLİŞ TOPLULUĞU | 91 |
| National Will Society | MİLLİ İRADE TOPLULUĞU | 73 |
| National Ideal Society | MİLLİ MEFKURE TOPLULUĞU | 20 |
| National Defense and Technology Society | MİLLİ SAVUNMA ve TEKNOLOJİ TOPLULUĞU | 94 |
| Architecture and Design Society | MİMARLIK VE TASARIM TOPLULUĞU | 45 |
| Misya Aviation and Space Technologies Society | MİSYA HAVACILIK ve UZAY TEKN. TOPLULUĞU | 42 |
| Motorsports Society | MOTOR SPORLARI TOPLULUĞU | 44 |
| Music Society | MÜZİK TOPLULUĞU | 316 |
| Ombudsmanship Society | OMBUDSMANLIK TOPLULUĞU | 70 |
| Forestry and Nature Research Society | ORMAN VE DOĞA ARAŞTIRMALARI TOPLULUĞU | 20 |
| Psychiatry Society | PSİKİYATRİ TOPLULUĞU | 42 |
| Psychology Society | PSİKOLOJİ TOPLULUĞU | 108 |
| Psychological Counseling and Guidance Society | PSİKOLOJİK DANIŞMANLIK ve REHBERLİK TOP. | 198 |
| Radio and Communication Society | RADYO ve İLETİŞİM TOPLULUĞU | 30 |
| Robotics Society | ROBOT TOPLULUĞU | 39 |
| Health Academy Society | SAĞLIK AKADEMİSİ TOPLULUĞU | 29 |
| Health Ambassadors Society | SAĞLIK ELÇİLERİ TOPLULUĞU | 20 |
| Healthy Living Society | SAĞLIKLI YAŞAM TOPLULUĞU | 41 |
| Healthcare Innovation Society | SAĞLIKTA İNOVASYON TOPLULUĞU | 20 |
| Chess Society | SATRANÇ TOPLULUĞU | 117 |
| Political Science, Management and Futurism Society | SİYASET YÖNETİMİ ve FÜTÜRİZM TOPLULUĞU | 109 |
| Sociology Society | SOSYOLOJİ TOPLULUĞU | 0 |
| Underwater Sports Society | SUALTI SPORLARI TOPLULUĞU | 124 |
| TEKNOFEST Society | TEKNOFEST TOPLULUĞU | 20 |
| Medical Faculty Scientific Research Society | TIP FAKÜLTESİ BİLİMSEL ARAŞTIRMA TOP. | 75 |
| Theatre Society | TİYATRO TOPLULUĞU | 323 |
| Community Volunteers Society | TOPLUM GÖNÜLLÜLERİ TOPLULUĞU | 0 |
| Turkish Medical Students' Association (TurkMSIC) | TÜRK TIP ÖĞRENCİLERİ BİRLİĞİ TOPLULUĞU | 47 |
| Türk Yurdu Society | TÜRK YURDU TOPLULUĞU | 496 |
| International Information and Technology Society | ULUSLARARASI BİLGİ ve TEKNOLOJİ TOPLULUĞU | 280 |
| IEEE Student Branch Society | ULUSLARARASI ELEKTRİK ELEKTRONİK MÜH. TOP. | 312 |
| International Student Society | ULUSLARARASI ÖĞRENCİ TOPLULUĞU | 82 |
| Active University Youth Society | ÜNİVERSİTELİ AKTİF GENÇLER TOPLULUĞU | 0 |
| AI Literacy Society | YAPAY ZEKA OKURYAZARLIĞI TOPLULUĞU | 20 |
| AI and Data Science Society | YAPAY ZEKA VE VERİ BİLİMİ TOPLULUĞU | 20 |
| Lifelong Development Society | YAŞAM BOYU GELİŞİM TOPLULUĞU | 132 |
| Creative Writing and Applied Literature Society | YARATICI YAZARLIK ve UYGULAMALI EDEBİYAT TOP. | 123 |
| Yeniler Society | YENİLER TOPLULUĞU | 26 |
| Green Crescent Society | YEŞİLAY TOPLULUĞU | 55 |
| Yörük Turkmen Culture Research Society | YÖRÜK TÜRKMEN KÜLTÜRÜNÜ ARAŞTIRMA TOP. | 173 |
| Total Active Members | | 11,559 |

== Notable alumni ==
- Yasemin Adar, Turkish female freestyle wrestler
- Tuna Aktürk, ex Vice-Mayor of Balıkesir Mayority and Balıkesirspor President
- Halil İnalcık, Historian of Ottoman Empire
- Muharrem İnce, Member of Turkish Parliament
- Gülşah Kocatürk, Turkish female judoka
- İsmail Özgün, Turkish politician
- Ümit Sonkol, Türk Telekom B.K. basketball player
