= Düğün çorbası =

Type of Turkish soup

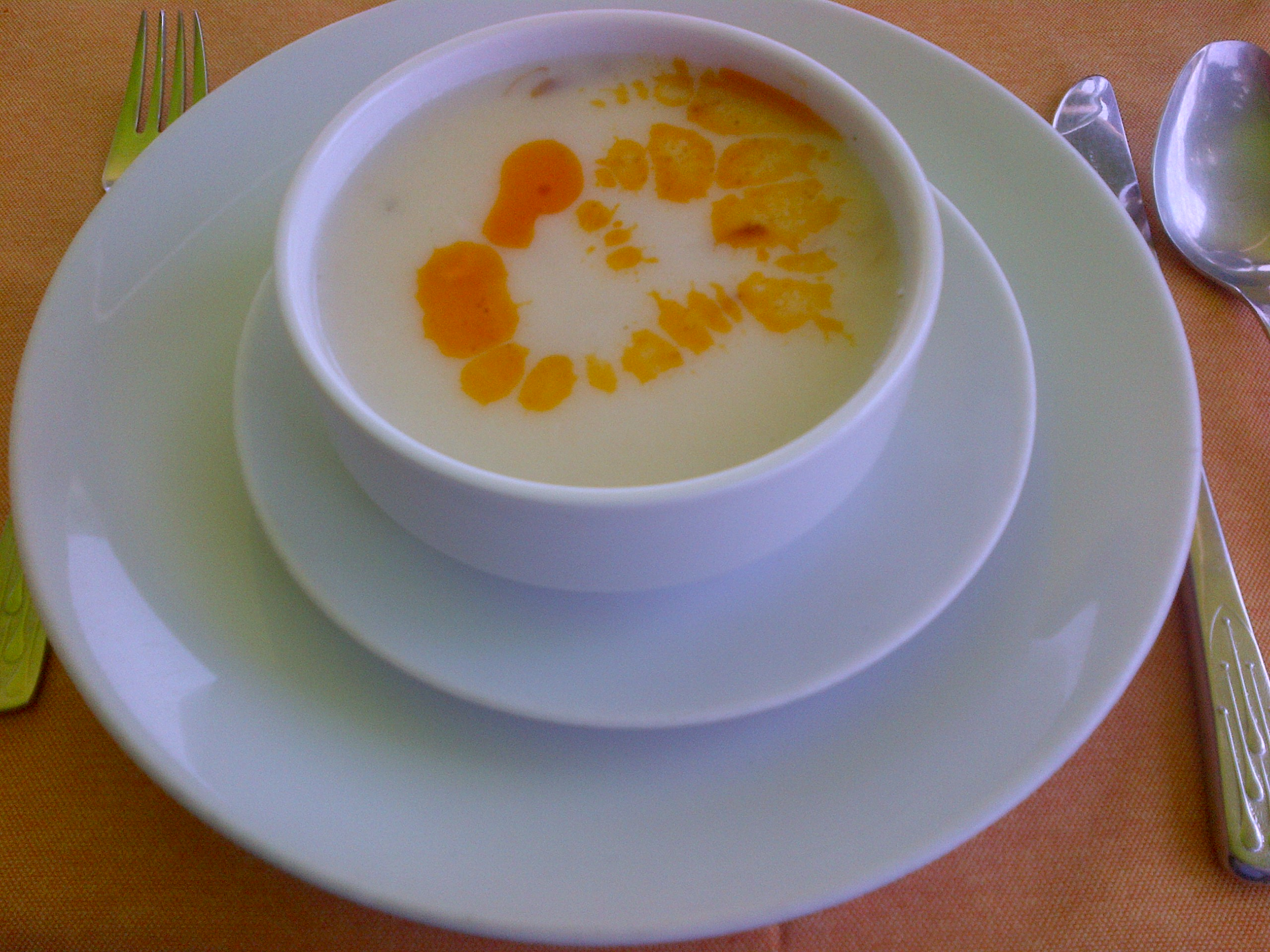
- Course: Main course
- Region or state: Turkey
- Serving temperature: Hot

Düğün çorbası (Turkish: Düğün çorbası) is the Turkish cuisine soup on lamb or beef broth. Now is a popular dish for every day, mainly in the cold season, but initially the hearty soup Düğün çorbası was the opening meal on a wedding feast in the village, which could continue according to tradition for forty days and forty nights.

For Düğün çorbası, the meat pulp is cut into small pieces and boiled with a head of onions and grated carrots. When ready, the meat is crushed or wiped, the broth is filtered. The resulting soup is thickened with flour browned in butter and boiled, in conclusion, a mixture of beaten egg yolks with lemon juice is poured in. Düğün çorbası is seasoned with red paprika when served in melted butter. Depending on the region, leeks, celery and boiled beans may also be present in the recipe.

== See also ==
- List of soups
