= Hoşmerim =

Flour-based cheese helvah

Höşmerim
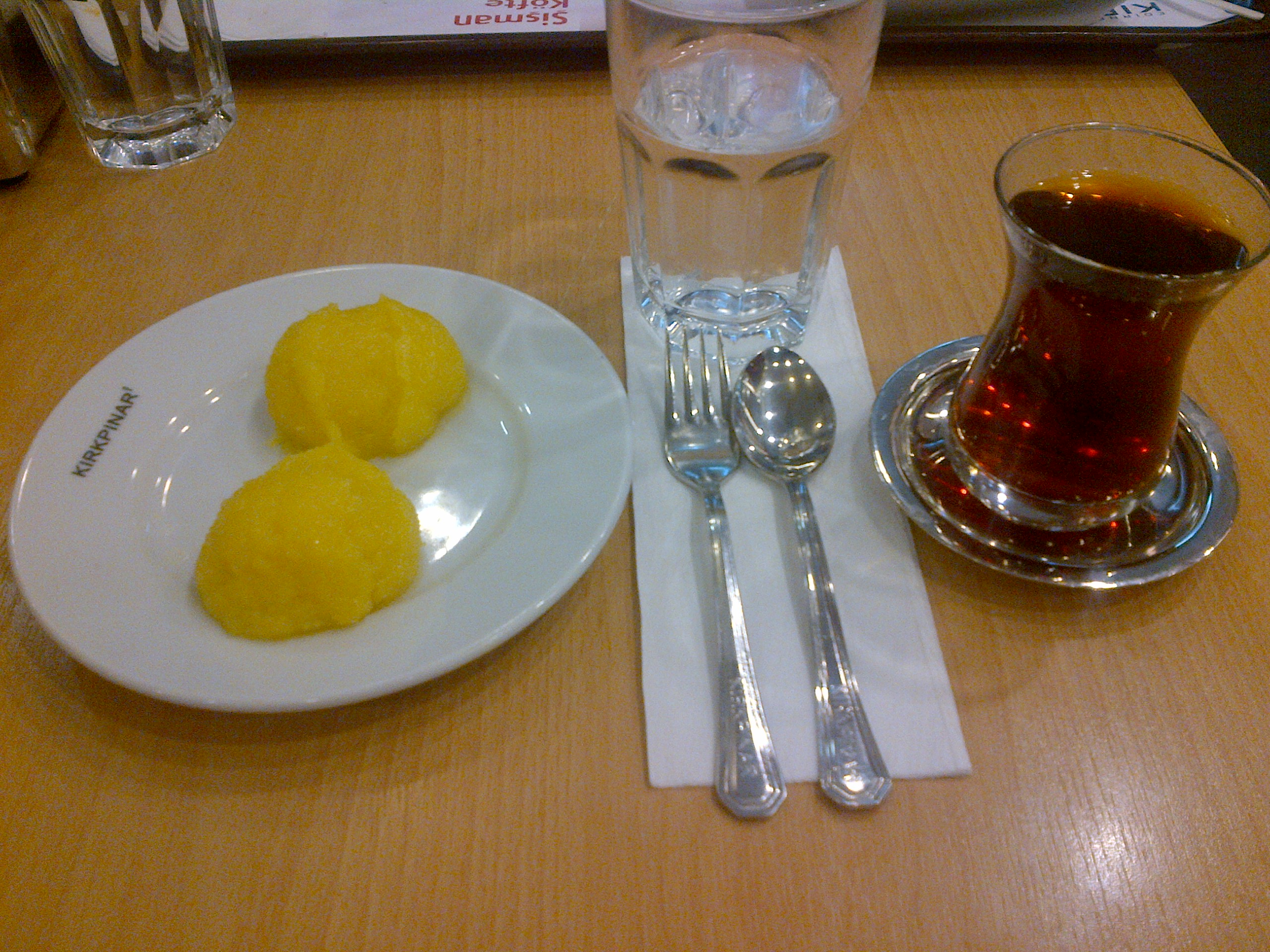
- Hoşmerim and Turkish tea
- Course: Dessert
- Place of origin: Turkey
- Main ingredients: Semolina, cheese, sugar, milk, almond

Höşmerim or hoşmerim is a Turkish dessert popular in the Aegean, Marmara, Trakya and Central Anatolia, Black Sea, East Black Sea regions of Turkey. It is sometimes called peynir helva or "cheese halva". It is generally consumed after a meal as a light dessert and may be topped with ice cream, honey or nuts.

Höşmerim has been served for 50–55 years as a commercial product in the markets and pastry shops. However, most of its manufacture occurs on a small scale. Recipes and methods may differ from one region to another. Traditional recipes include fresh unsalted cheese, semolina and powdered sugar. Commercially produced höşmerim may include cream, egg and riboflavin in addition to the traditional ingredients for the homemade varieties.

== Etymology ==
The Turkish word hoşmerim is loaned from the Persian word χʷoş-maram (خوش مرم). It is a compound word, derived from χʷoş (خوش), meaning "sweet" and maram (مرم), meaning "kaymak". The oldest attested use of the word in a Turkic language is found in Ni‘mettullāh bin Aḥmed bin Ḳāżī Mübārek er-Rūmī's 1540 dictionary Lügat-i Ni'metu'llâh.

According to the folk etymology, a soldier could not see his wife for a long time because of the war. When the war finished, the man came to his village and saw his wife. His wife prepared Hoşmerim and asked her husband "Hoş mu erim?" meaning "Is it nice, my man?"

== See also ==
- Baklava
- Bülbül yuvası
- Sütlü Nuriye
