= Çayırköy Cave =

Cave in Zonguldak Province, Turkey

Coordinates: 41.4621°N 31.9888°E

Çayırköy Cave (Turkish: Çayırköy Mağarası) is a cave located in Çayırköy town of Zonguldak Province, northern Turkey. The site is a geosite of the Zonguldak Coal Geopark.

The cave is a river cave which forms a resurgence, the water sinks 1.5 km to the west in the Sofular valley. The water was used as drinking water by the Romans. Right after the spring it was collected and transported to the city of Tios – Tieion, today’s Filyos, in a canal or waterway, which had a length of some 25 km. So the site is not only a geosite but also an archaeological site.

The cave which is visited is the upper level of the cave which is dry. After a huge entrance portal which has a massive hill of debris from the cliff above, the trail descends to the actual cave floor. This passage forms an enormous chamber with huge stalactites. As the daylight still reaches this section, it is green with moss, including the speleothems.
