= Tumaslı, Nakhchivan =

Tumaslı
- Municipality
- Location within Azerbaijan
- Coordinates: 39°28′00″N 45°00′29″E
- Country: Azerbaijan
- Autonomous republic: Nakhchivan
- District: Sharur

Population (2005)
  - Total: 605
- Time zone: UTC+4 (AZT)

Tumaslı (also, Tumasly and Tumaslu) is a village and municipality in the Sharur District of Nakhchivan, Azerbaijan. It is located 12 km in the south from the district center, on the plain. Its population is busy with farming and animal husbandry. There are secondary school, library, club, kindergarten and a medical center in the village. It has a population of 605.

== Etymology ==
According to information of the locals, the village was founded by families who moved from the Tumas (present "Dağ Tumas") village of the Jabrayil region in the 19th century.
