= Çaytumas =

- Location within Azerbaijan
- Coordinates: 39°17′57″N 46°42′47″E
- Country: Azerbaijan
- Rayon: Qubadli
- Time zone: UTC+4 (AZT)
  - Summer (DST): UTC+5 (AZT)

Çaytumas (also, Çay Tumas and Chaytumas) is a village in the Qubadli Rayon of Azerbaijan.
