= Kolonya =

Turkish perfume

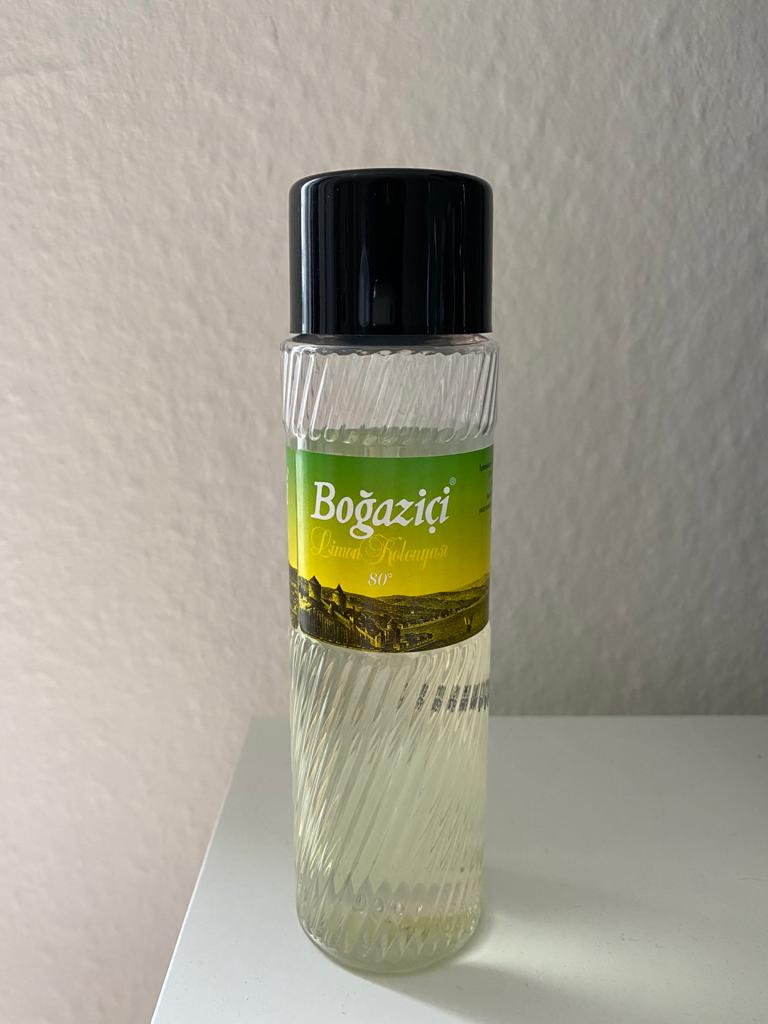
An image of a bottle of Kolonya. Kolonya can also be contained in a larger, rectangular container that has a spray attachment.

Kolonya (from Turkish: cologne) is a type of perfume. Kolonya is commonly used as a cologne, perfume, or hand sanitizer. It can sometimes be used as a surrogate alcohol by poor alcoholics and teenagers, usually resulting in fatal poisonings or blindness. As a result of this, the Turkish Food Safety Ministry has required adding a bittering agent, since 2018, to reduce the likelihood of people ingesting the liquid. Cheap Kolonya can contain methyl alcohol which is absorbable by skin, causing Methanol toxicity. Higher quality Kolonya is denatured with isopropyl alcohol instead of methanol.

== Description ==
=== History ===
Kolonya originated in Turkey – then part of the Ottoman Empire – in the 19th century, when cologne was first imported from Germany. The perfume inspired new methods of scent-making, and supplanted rosewater as the primary fragrance in Turkey. Other scents were later added to the imported perfume, creating a uniquely Turkish product.

=== Make-up and usage ===
Kolonya is composed of ethyl alcohol (between 60 and 80 percent), water, and fragrance. In addition to being used as a cologne, it is commonly used as a disinfectant or hand sanitizer. Traditionally, the aroma is derived from fig blossoms, jasmine, rose or citrus ingredients (usually contains limonene and linalool). It tends to be seen in many Turkish homes where it is offered to guests. It is often used to sanitize hands or as a way to reduce a fever due to its cooling effects. It comes in a wide variety of smells and colours from orange to green. It is often shown in memes and jokes as being an antidote to fainting (due to its strong smell). Nevertheless, Kolonya is part of Turkish tradition and is a staple in the Turkish home.
