= Vayxır, Babek =

Vayxır
- Municipality
- Location within Azerbaijan
- Coordinates: 39°20′59″N 45°28′03″E
- Country: Azerbaijan
- Autonomous republic: Nakhchivan
- District: Babek

Population (2005)
  - Total: 1,309
- Time zone: UTC+4 (AZT)

Vayxır (also, Vaykhyr) is a village and municipality in the Babek District of Nakhchivan, Azerbaijan. It is located 21 km in the north from the district center, on the left bank of the Nakhchivanchay River. Its population is busy with grain-growing, poultry and animal husbandry. There are secondary school, culture house and a medical center in the village. It has a population of 1,309.

== Etymology ==
Near the village, there exist the ruins of the old Vaykhir village. The present Vaykhir settlement was founded after the collapse of the same village. The name of the village is related with the Vaykhir mineral spring which is located in there. Vaykhir spring consists of two cold springs. It is used by local people for medical treatment. According to some researchers, the name of the spring is composed of Iranian words of Vah (pleasant, pleasing) and Xar "khar" (place) and means "a pleasing place".

== Historical and archaeological monuments ==
=== Vaykhyr Fortress ===
Govurqala - is the fortress on the left bank of the Nakhchivanchay River, near the same named village of the Babek region. It was surrounded by steep cliffs and the deep ravine from the each side and has a natural protection. The castle, as well as reinforced with extra fortification. The defensive wall has the four-cornered and the angle form towers. The walls are built with the gently sculpted large rocks and was fixed with mud of clay. At the result of research it was studied and has developed the restoration project. The tower belongs to the 2nd millennium of BC.

=== Vayxır ===
Old Vaykhyr - the settlement of the Middle Ages in the 1 km east of the same named village of the Babak district. Was recorded in 1967. Its area is 5 ha. The thickness of cultural layer is 1.5 m. Because the monument is located on the slope, the cultural layer was exposed to heavy erosion. A lot of fragments of glazed and unglazed clay pots were collected from the settlement. Glazed pots, mostly in brown, also white, yellow, green color were decorated with exquisite taste in the geometric and plant form. The findings show that the Vaykhyr settlement belongs to the 9th -17th centuries.

=== Vaykhir Necropolis ===
Vaykhir Necropolis - the archaeological monument of the late Bronze Age and early Iron Age in the north-east from the same named village of the Babak district. It is located in a narrow valley stretching from north to south. Was recorded in 1970. At the result of erosion the rectangular-shaped stone box graves were destroyed. From the cemetery were found the products clay pot and the remains of obsidian. Ceramic pieces ornamented with gray and black carved tracery, monochrom painted ceramics, bronze crescent earrings are collected. It is supposed that the cemetery belongs to the 2-1 millennium BC.
