= Tumaslı, Barda =

Tumasly
- Municipality
- Azerbaijani: Tumasly
- Location within Azerbaijan Location within Karabakh Economic Region
- Coordinates: 40°18′04″N 47°12′56″E
- Country: Azerbaijan
- District: Barda

Population
  - Total: 865
- Time zone: UTC+4 (AZT)
  - Summer (DST): UTC+5 (AZT)

Tumaslı (also, Tumasly) is a village and municipality in the Barda District of Azerbaijan. It has a population of 865.
