= Balıkesir Province =

Province of Turkey

Coordinates: 39°44′27″N 27°49′09″E

Balıkesir Province Balıkesir ili
- Province and metropolitan municipality
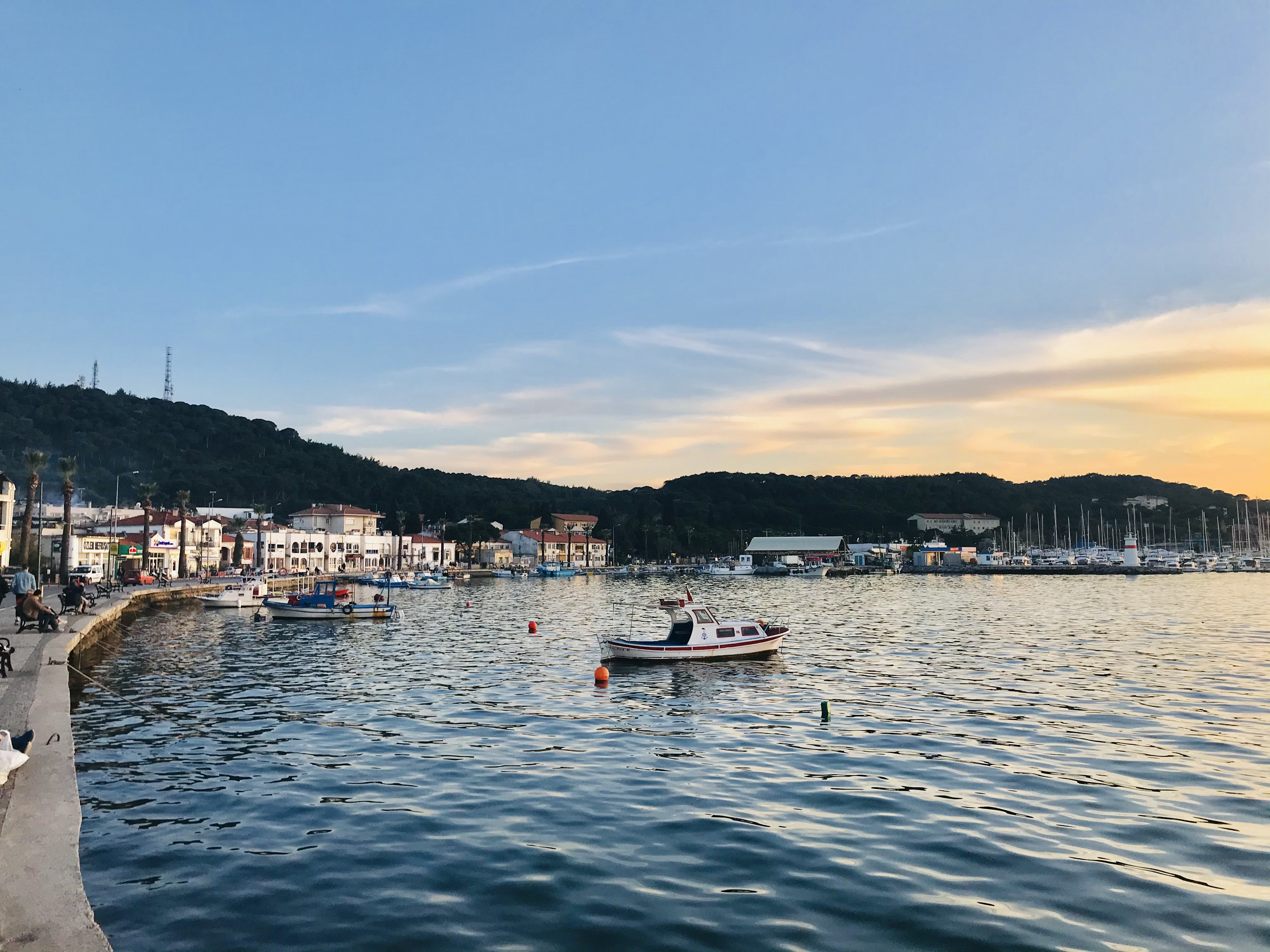

- Location of the province within Turkey
- Country: Turkey
- Seat: Balıkesir

Government
  - Mayor: Ahmet Akın (CHP)
  - Vali: İsmail Ustaoğlu
- Area: 14,583 km^{2} (5,631 sq mi)
- Population (2024): 1,276,096
  - Density: 87.506/km^{2} (226.64/sq mi)
- Time zone: UTC+3 (TRT)
- Area code: 0266
- Website: www.balikesir.bel.tr www.balikesir.gov.tr

Balıkesir Province (Turkish: Balıkesir ili) is a province and metropolitan municipality in northwestern Turkey with coastlines on both the Sea of Marmara and the Aegean. Its area is 14,583 km^{2}, and its population is 1,276,096 (2024). Its adjacent provinces are Çanakkale to the west, İzmir to the southwest, Manisa to the south, Kütahya to the southeast, and Bursa to the east. The provincial capital is Balıkesir. Most of the province lies in the Marmara Region except the southern parts of Bigadiç Edremit, Kepsut, İvrindi, Savaştepe and Sındırgı districts and ones of Ayvalık, Burhaniye, Dursunbey, Gömeç and Havran, that bound the Aegean Region. Kaz Dağı (pronounced [kaz daːɯ]), known also as Mount Ida, is located in this province. Balıkesir province is famous for its olives, thermal spas, and clean beaches, making it an important tourist destination. The province also hosts immense deposits of kaolinite and borax, with some open-pit mines. The Kaz mountains are also threatened with the expansion of gold mining using cyanide which puts the villagers' lives, the agricultural economy, and tourism at risk.

== Districts ==
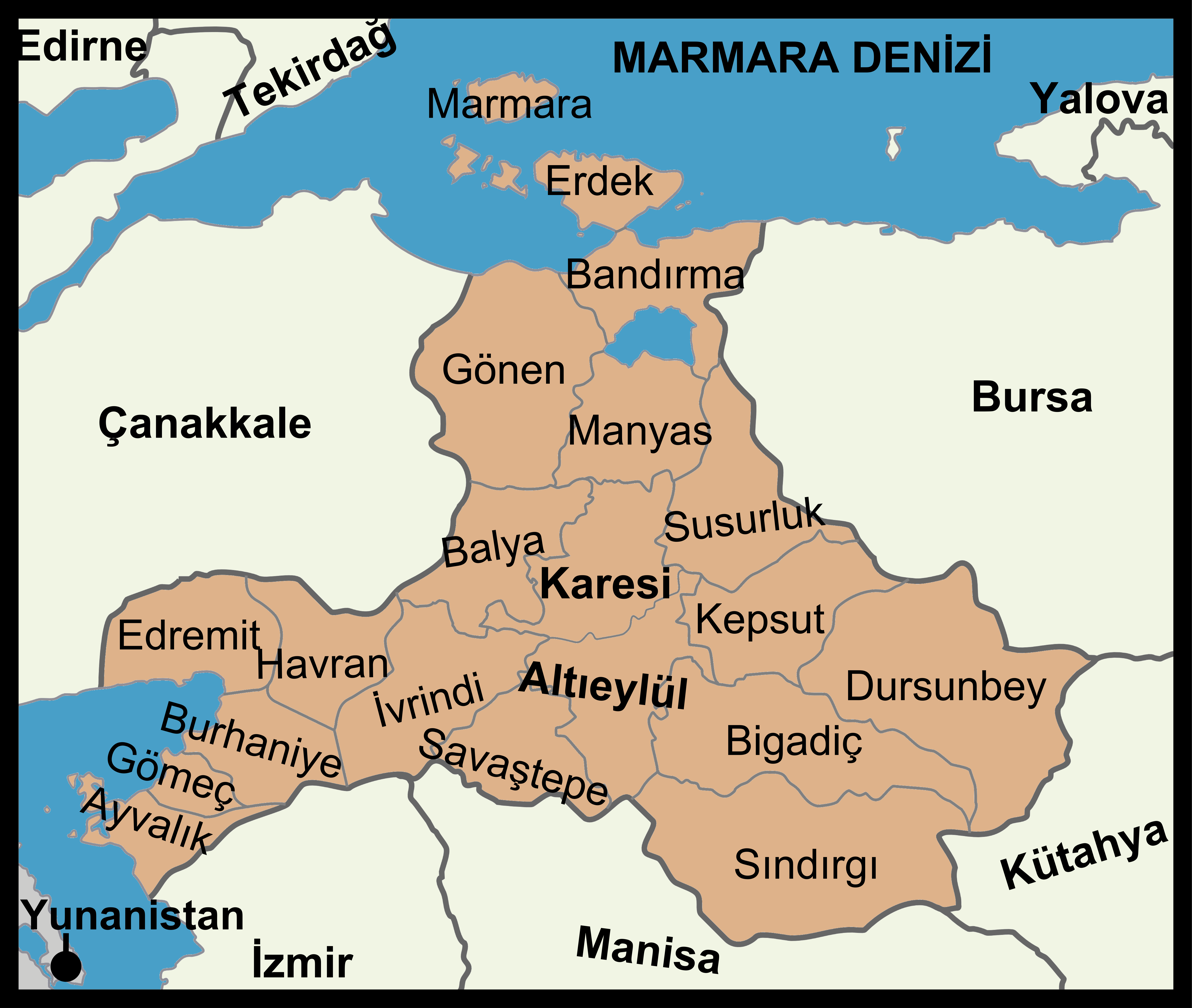
Districts of the Balıkesir Province

There are 20 districts in Balıkesir Province under the Balıkesir Metropolitan Municipality.

- Altıeylül
- Ayvalık
- Balya
- Bandırma
- Bigadiç
- Burhaniye
- Dursunbey
- Edremit
- Erdek
- Gömeç
- Gönen
- Havran
- İvrindi
- Karesi
- Kepsut
- Manyas
- Marmara
- Savaştepe
- Sındırgı
- Susurluk

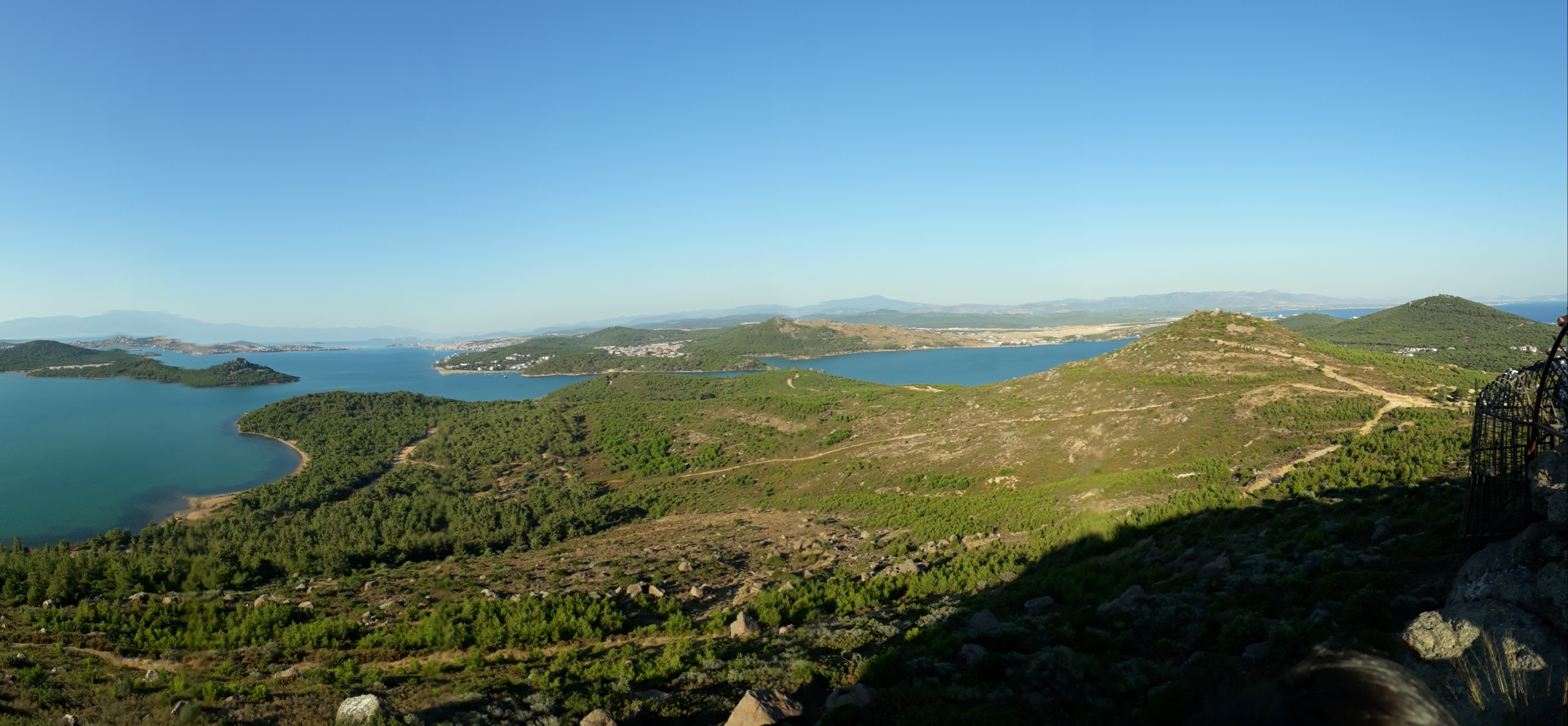
Ayvalık Islands

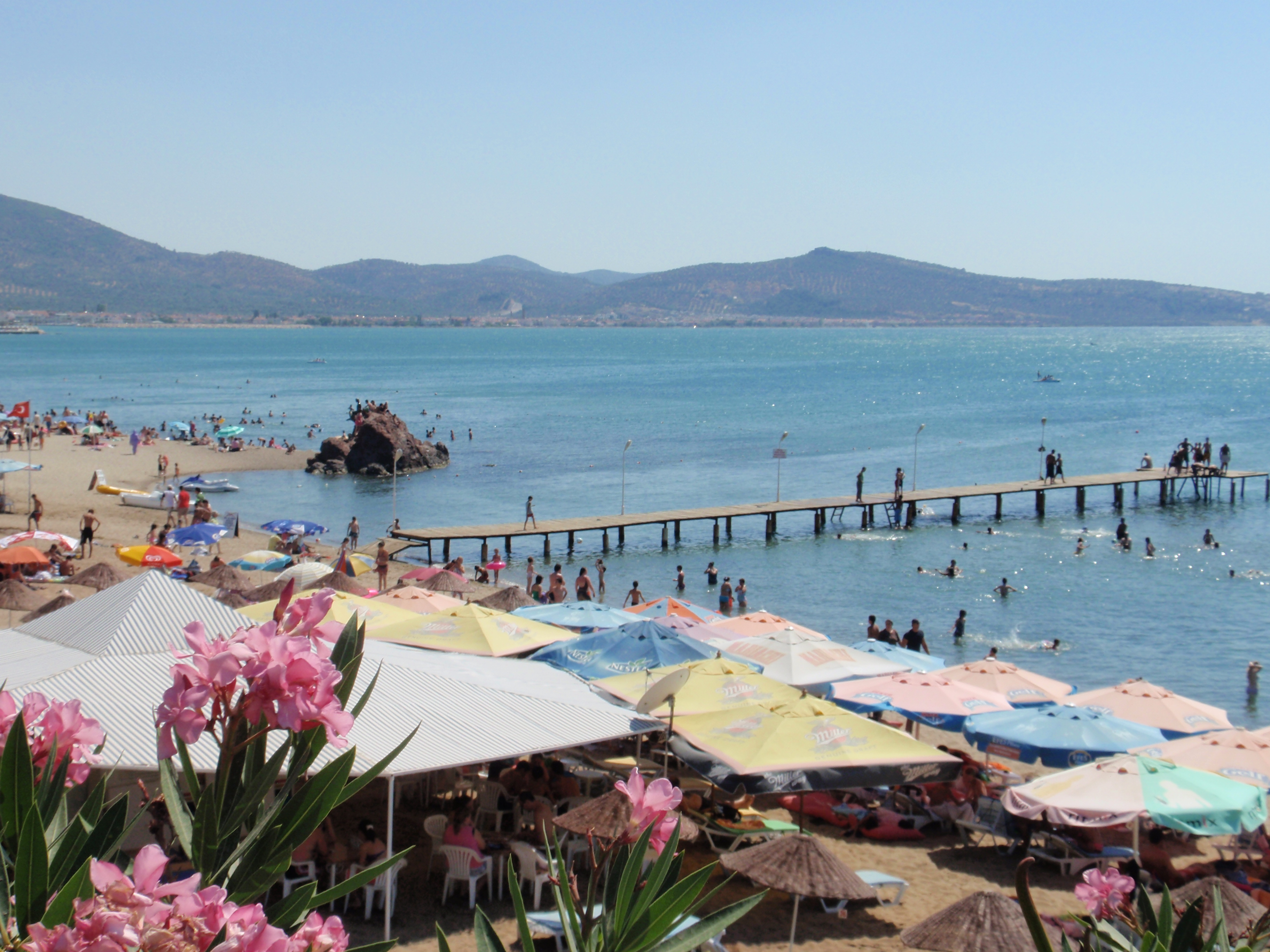
Ören Beach, Burhaniye

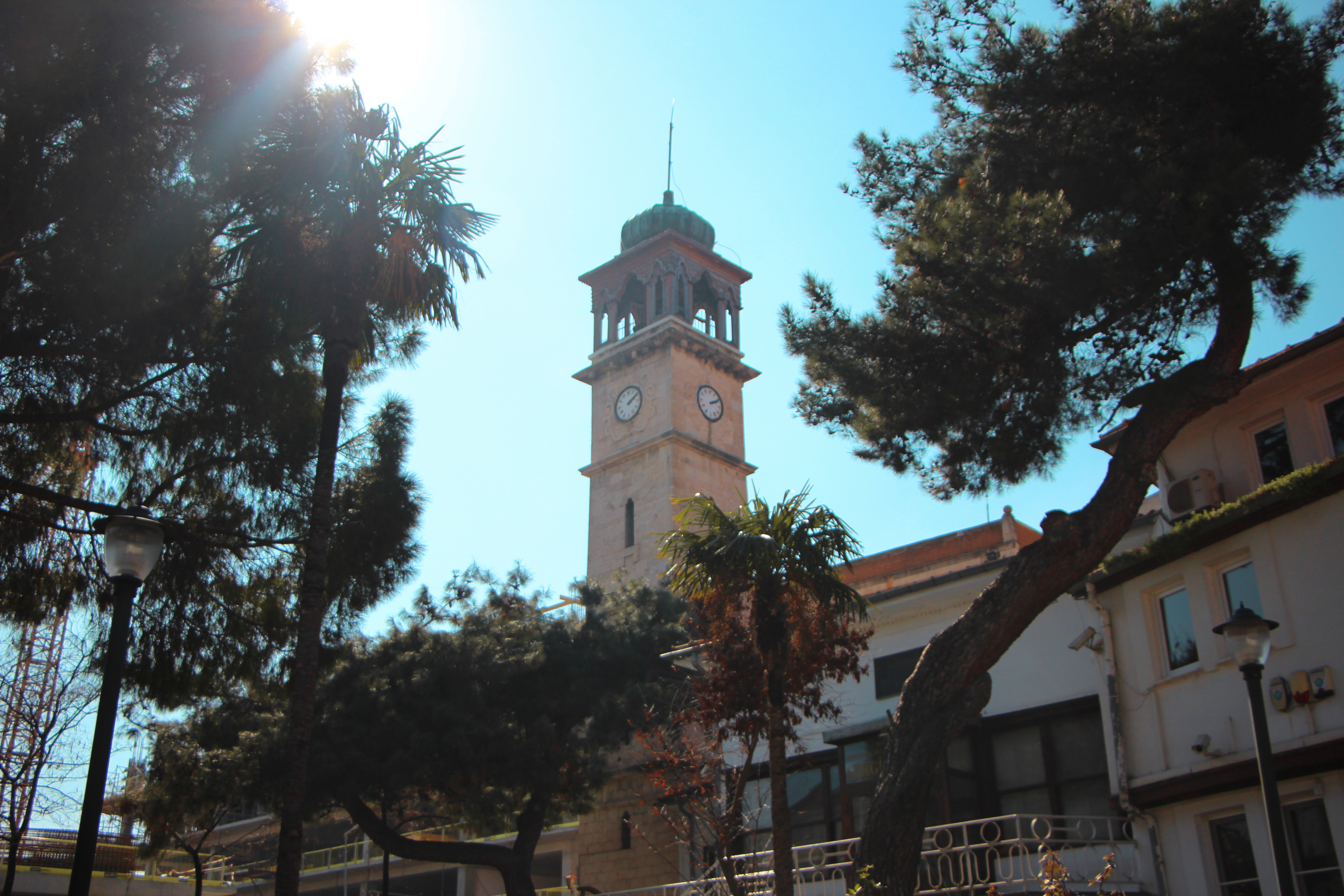
The historical clock tower

== Demographics ==
Historical population
Year	Pop.	±% p.a.
1927	421,066	—
1935	481,372	+1.69%
1940	482,827	+0.06%
1950	563,221	+1.55%
1960	670,669	+1.76%
1970	749,669	+1.12%
1980	853,177	+1.30%
1990	973,314	+1.33%
2000	1,076,347	+1.01%
2010	1,152,323	+0.68%
2020	1,240,285	+0.74%
Source: Turkstat

== Tourism ==
=== Sites of interest ===
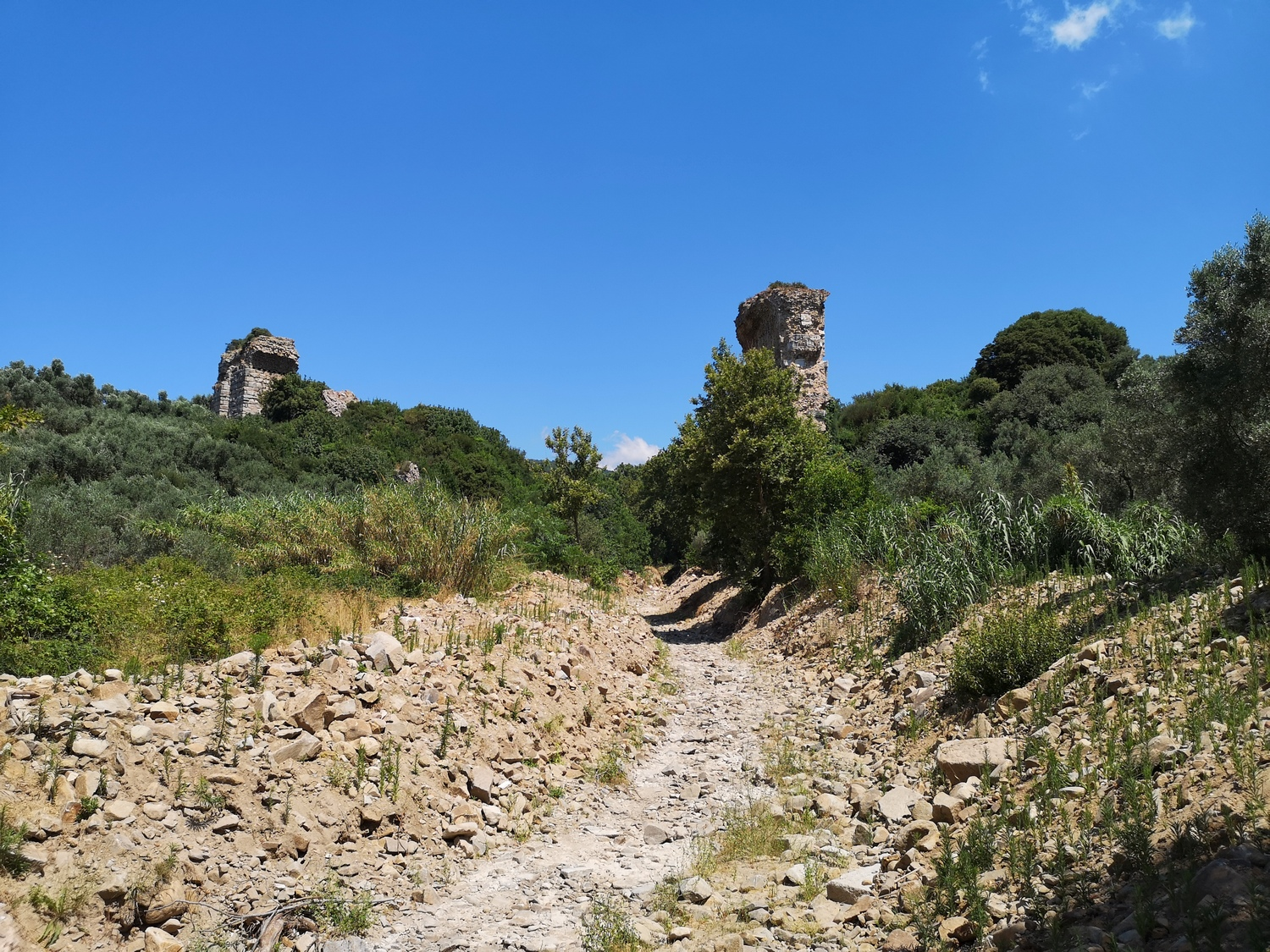
Amphitheatre of Cyzicus

Balıkesir is home to a number of natural attractions, including Kuş Cenneti (bird sanctuary) National Park; the bays of Erdek, Bandırma, and Edremit; Ayvalık's coastal beaches; Şeytan Sofrası, Marmara Islands, Alibey (Cunda) Island; the Erdek and Gönen open-air museums; Pamukçu-Bengi, Balya Dağ, Hisar, Hisarköy (Asarköy), Karağaç (Uyuz), Kepekler hot springs, Dutluca Village mineral springs, and Zeytinli Ada hot springs and mineral water springs.

Among the cultural attractions of Balıkesir are the ruins of Cyzicus and Saraylar on the Sea of Marmara, Dascylium (near Bandırma/Ereğli), and Antandrus (near Edremit/Altınoluk); Balıkesir's Yıldırım Mosque (Eski Cami), the Zagan Pasha Mosque complex, Clocked Church Mosque and quantity of Ottoman vernacular architecture at Ayvalık, and Alibey Mosque (Çınarlı Cami). The Kuş Cenneti National Park near Lake Manyas is an ornithological site where 266 different species of birds flourish – every year over three million birds fly through there. There are horse breeding farms 13 km southeast of Bandırma, in Karacabey.

There are a city museum and a fine arts centre in Balıkesir. Also, there are several camping facilities in Erdek, Altınoluk, Akçay, Güre, and Ören.

=== Ancient sites ===
- Adramyttium
- Antandrus
- Dascylium
- Hadrianoutherai
- Cyzicus
- Lyrnessus
- Pordoselene
- Prokonnessos
- Thebe Hypoplakia
- Zeleia

=== Museums ===
- Balıkesir Kuvayi Milliye Museum
- Bandırma Archaeological Museum
- Edremit Ayşe Sıdıka Erke Ethnography Museum
- Balıkesir National Photography Museum
- Edremit Tahtakuşlar Ethnography Museum
- Gönen Mosaic Museum
- Balıkesir Municipality's Devrim Erbil Modern Arts Museum
- Bigadiç Museum House
- Marmara District Palaces Open Air Museum
- Altınoluk Antardos Open Air Museum
- Erdek Belkıs Ruins Open Air Museum

=== National parks ===
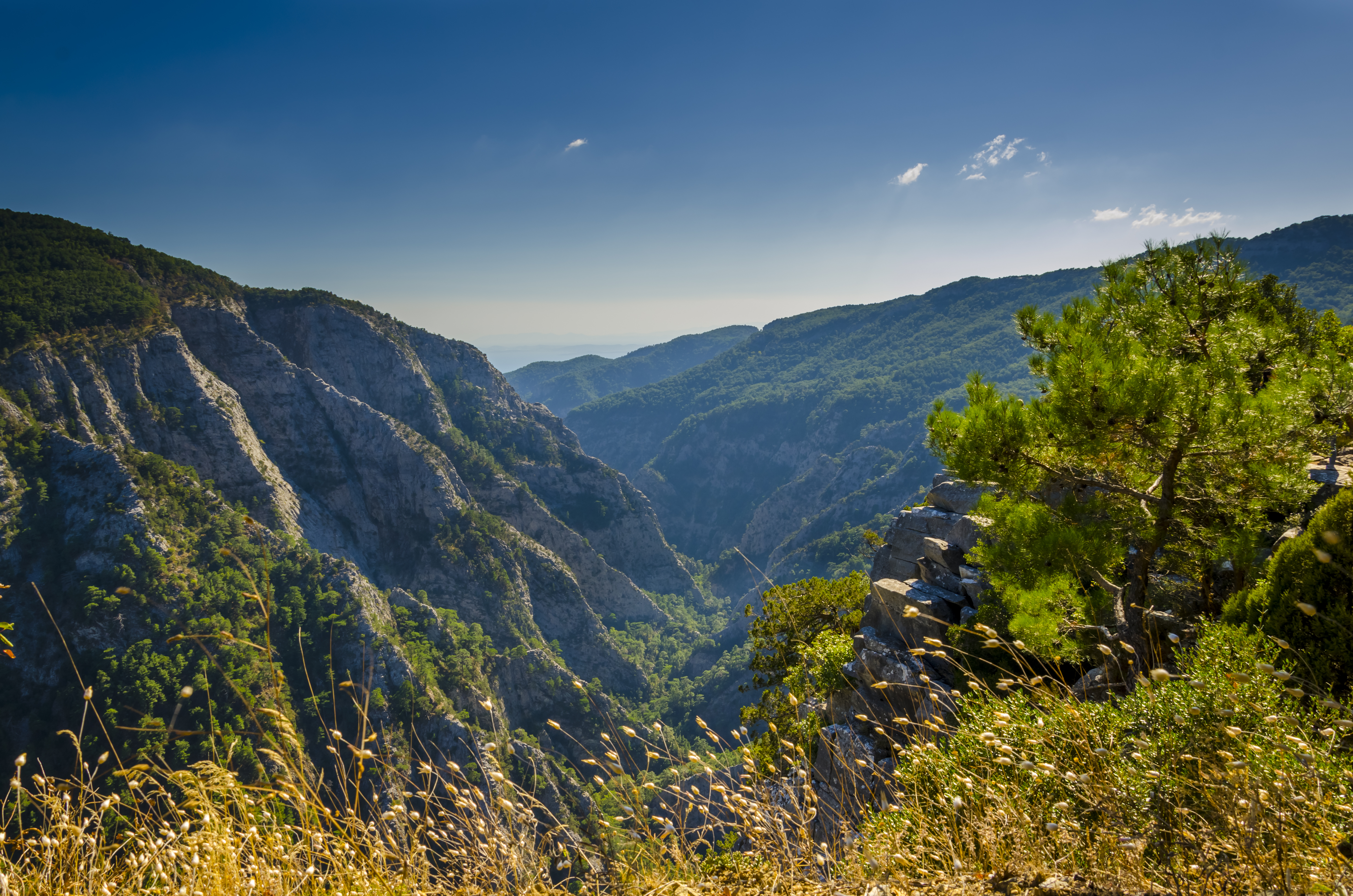
Mount Ida or Kaz Dağı

- Erdek Kapıdağ Region
- Kaz Dağı National Park
- Kuş Cenneti National Park
- Alaçam Mountains
- Ayvalık Islands Natural Park
- Madra Mountains

=== Beaches ===
Balıkesir has coastlines on the Sea of Marmara and Aegen Sea. Edremit, Burhaniye, Gömeç and Ayvalık are the districts which are popular for their beaches, located in the Aegean coast of the Balıkesir; Marmara Island, Erdek, Gönen and Bandırma are the districts that are located on the Marmara coast of Balıkesir.

Around the Gulf of Edremit in Balıkesir province are some of the coastlines where encircled by clear waters and sandy beaches and silvery green olive groves. Ayvalık, a holiday towns on this coastline, is located in the midst of pine and olive trees. Its houses ornamented with wood and stone. Cunda Island, linked to Ayvalık via a bridge, is known for its sunsets, seafood and taverns. Şeytan Sofrası (Devil's Table), so called because it is set on a tableshaped hill formed from lava, offers a panoramic view over the 22 islands in Ayvalık Bay. A footprint, enclosed by iron bars, is said to be that of the devil himself. There are sandy beaches approximately 6 km south of the town in the Sarımsaklı area. Altınkum, meaning "golden sand", is a beach in this district. It has restaurants and bars for entertainment. There is also an attractive street market in the centre of the resort and lots of shops.

Burhaniye, Ören, Edremit, Akçay and Altınoluk are also among the holiday towns which attract vacationers interested in a holiday with scenery and historical, archaeological sites.

=== Thermal tourism ===
Balıkesir and its districts, besides the wealth of thermal resources, have healing waters with reputed physical and chemical compositions.

Many spas which claim to have health-promoting features surround the city, including Pamukçu and Ilıca. The center of the city also contains the historical Turkish "Pasha Hamami" bath, which is still in use. Some of these thermal resources located in;

Pamukçu, Kiraz, Edremit-Güre, Edremit-Bostancı, Edremit-Derman, Gönen, Gönen-Ekşidere, Manyas-Kızık Köy, Susurluk-Kepekler, Balya-Dağ, Bigadiç-Hisarköy, Sındırgı-Hisaralan, Sındırgı-Emendere and Dursunbey-Aşağımusalar Village.

55 km southwest of Bandırma is Gönen, one of Turkey's most important thermal resorts. The fact that the springs were used even in Roman times is witnessed by a 5th-century mosaic from what was originally a Roman bath. The waters come from 500 m below ground surfacing at a temperature of approximately 82 °C.

== Education ==
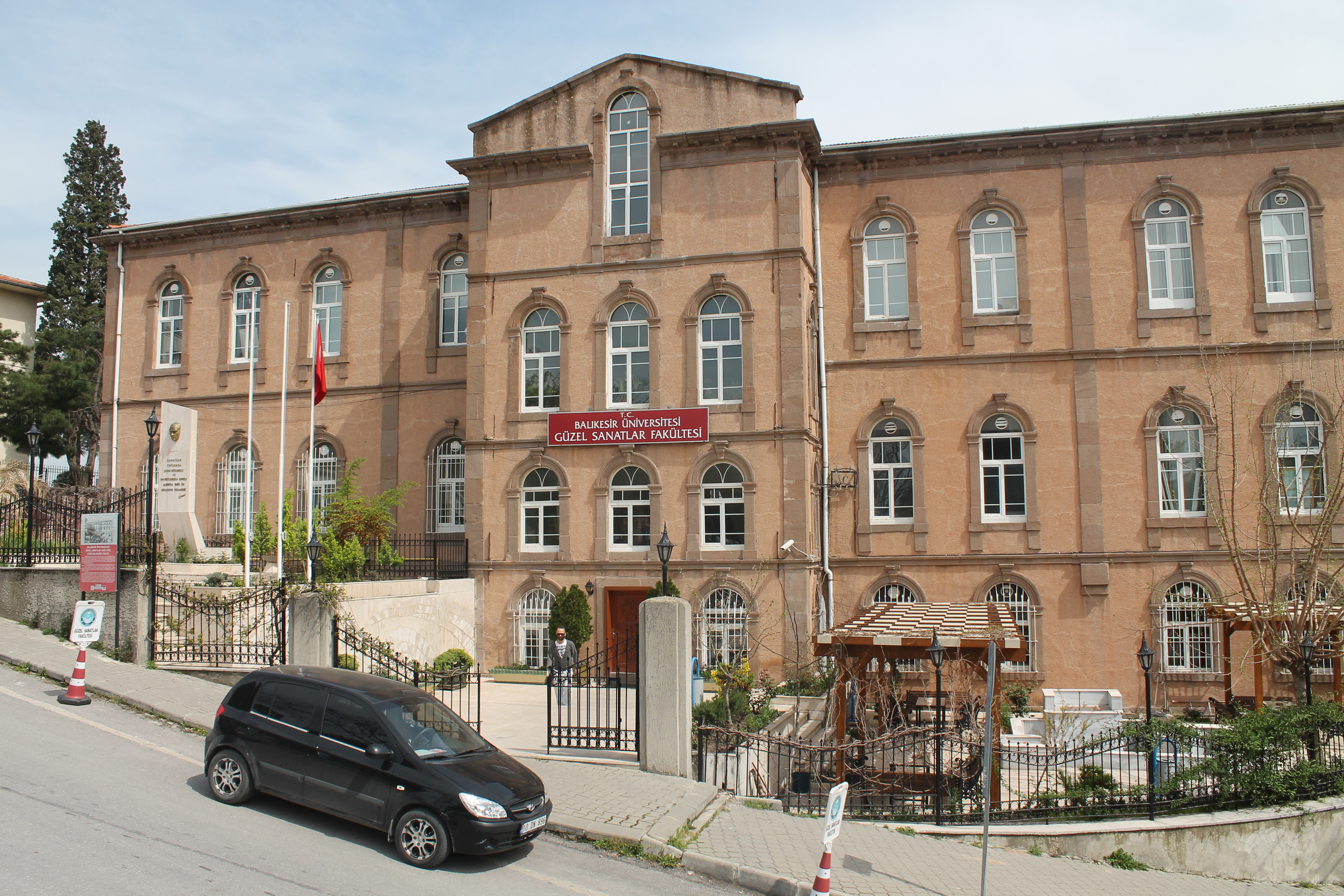
Balıkesir Faculty of Fine Arts

There are two universities in Balıkesir Province;

- Balıkesir University
- Bandırma Onyedi Eylül University

The foundation of Balıkesir University trace back to Karesi Teacher School established in 1910. This school has been carried to the building which is used as Necatibey Faculty of Education with particular interests of the Minister of Education, Mustafa Necati. Till 1982, the number of higher education institutes reached 4: Necati Institution of Education, Architecture and Engineering State Academy, Balıkesir School of Industry and Tourism, Balıkesir Vocational School. These foundations changed status with Delegated Legislation No 41 and were connected to Uludağ University. Necatibey Teacher's Training School continued to train teachers between the years 1932 and 1982 under the name of Necati Institution of Education, left its 3-year status, received 4-year-Higher Teacher Training School status. In 1982, having been connected to Uludağ University, this foundation has been called Necatibey Faculty of Education.

In the same way, the name of Balıkesir School of Industry and Tourism has been changed as Balıkesir School of Tourism and Hotel Management, but the name of 2-year-Balıkesir Vocational School has remained the same.

Balıkesir University has 37.000, Bandırma Onyedi Eylül University has more than 13.500 students.

Also, some of the scientists were born in Balıkesir. One of the most known is Selman Akbulut the Turkish mathematician, specializing in research in topology, and geometry and which is a student of Robion Kirby.

== Transportation and accommodation ==
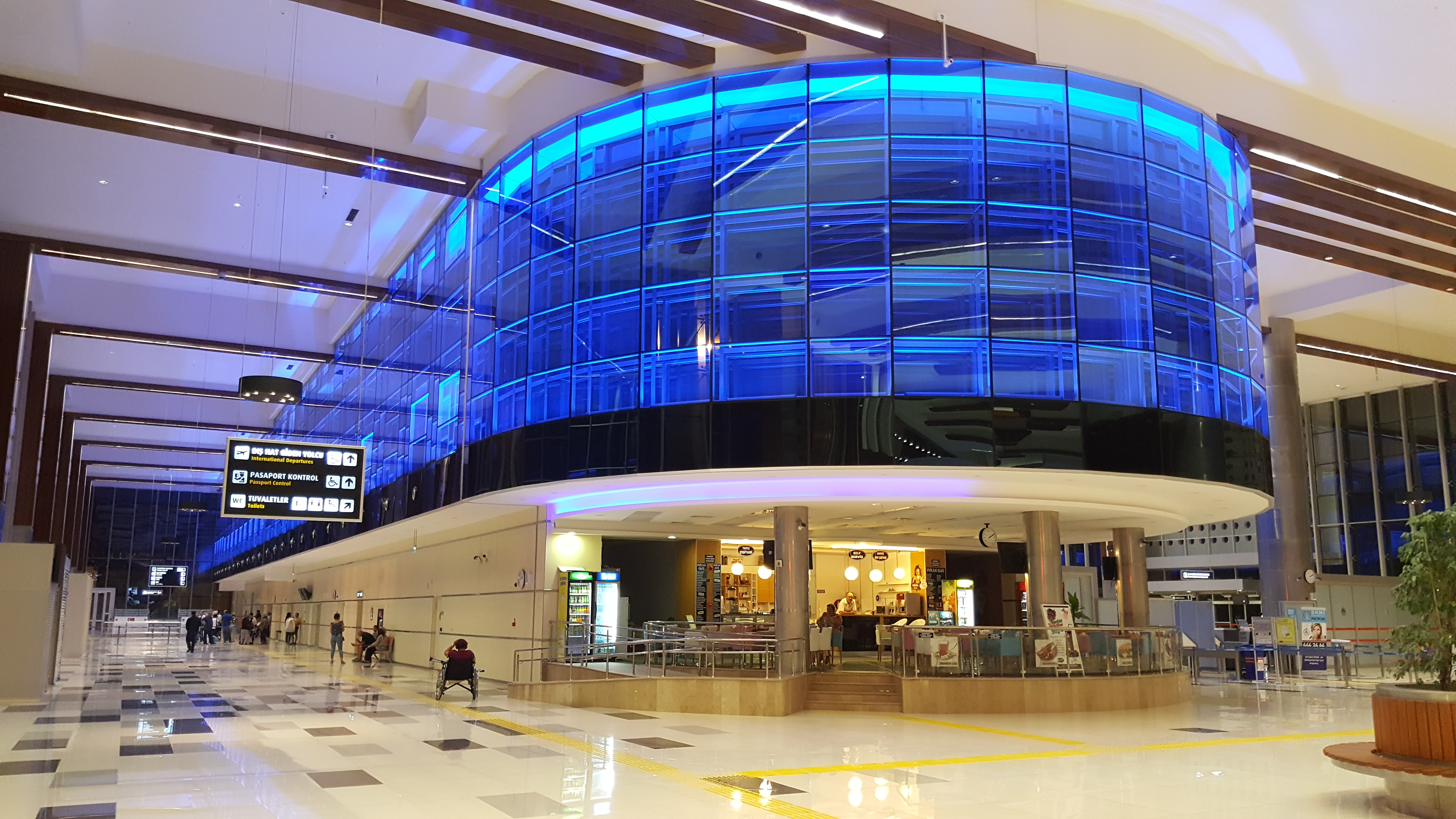
Balıkesir Koca Seyit Airport

Balıkesir is a city that has shores on the Aegean and Marmara Seas. It is easy to reach from Ankara, Istanbul, Bursa and İzmir by motorway or railway. There are regular coaches from Istanbul, Ankara and İzmir.

Balıkesir has many small coastal towns. To make transportation comfortable, railway transport is done between Ankara-Balıkesir and İzmir-Balikesir at specific hours. Balıkesir is joined to Bursa and İzmir by a quality motorway.

Also, there is the Koca Seyit Airport. On account of the airport, Balıkesir Coach Terminal is out of the city so that there is servicing by the municipality to the city centre. On the other hand, the Railway Station is at Republica Square.

== Economy ==
The economic base of the city is both agricultural and industrial. The biggest industrial enterprises are Arı-Turyağ, Limak-Set Çimento, BEST, Mar-Tük, İşbir, Kula, Tellioğlu, Bu Piliç and Yarış Kabin which are among the first thousand factories in Turkey as of 2008. Balıkesir city is also important for stock breeding. Surrounding the city, are numerous dairies. The city is also an agricultural centre. Wheat, sunflowers, sugar beets, and other vegetables in a front tomato and bean plantations have dense products. Traditional crops are melon and grapes. Balıkesir with its districts is the 12th largest economy in the Turkish economy. Also, it is called the Anatolian Tigers.

=== Agriculture ===
Other main exports are olive-based products. It is also a destination for both domestic and foreign tourists, who use it as a base to explore the near countryside, especially nearby Mount Ida (Kaz Dağı).

=== Mining ===
The city is well known with borax deposit. The largest global borax deposits known, many still untapped, are in Central and Western Turkey, including the provinces of Eskişehir, Kütahya and Balıkesir. Besides, Turkey and the United States are the largest producers of boron products. Turkey produces about half of the global yearly demand with the known deposits which possesses 72% of the world.

== Sports ==
Many sportspeople were born in Balıkesir. Some of them are;

- Cengiz Ünder - Football player
- Caner Erkin - Football player
- Egemen Korkmaz – Football player
- İlhan Eker – Football player
- Olcan Adın – Football player
- Oğuz Savaş – Basketball player
- Şafak Edge – Basketball player
- Tülin Altıntaş – Volleyball player

Most known sports club in Balıkesir is Balıkesirspor which is established in 1966. Balıkesirspor is the football team played in the Süper Lig after achieving promotion having finished as runners-up of the TFF First League in 2013–14. The team's previous promotion was 40 years before that. Their stadium, the all-seater Balıkesir Atatürk Stadium, has a capacity of 13,732.

== Culture ==
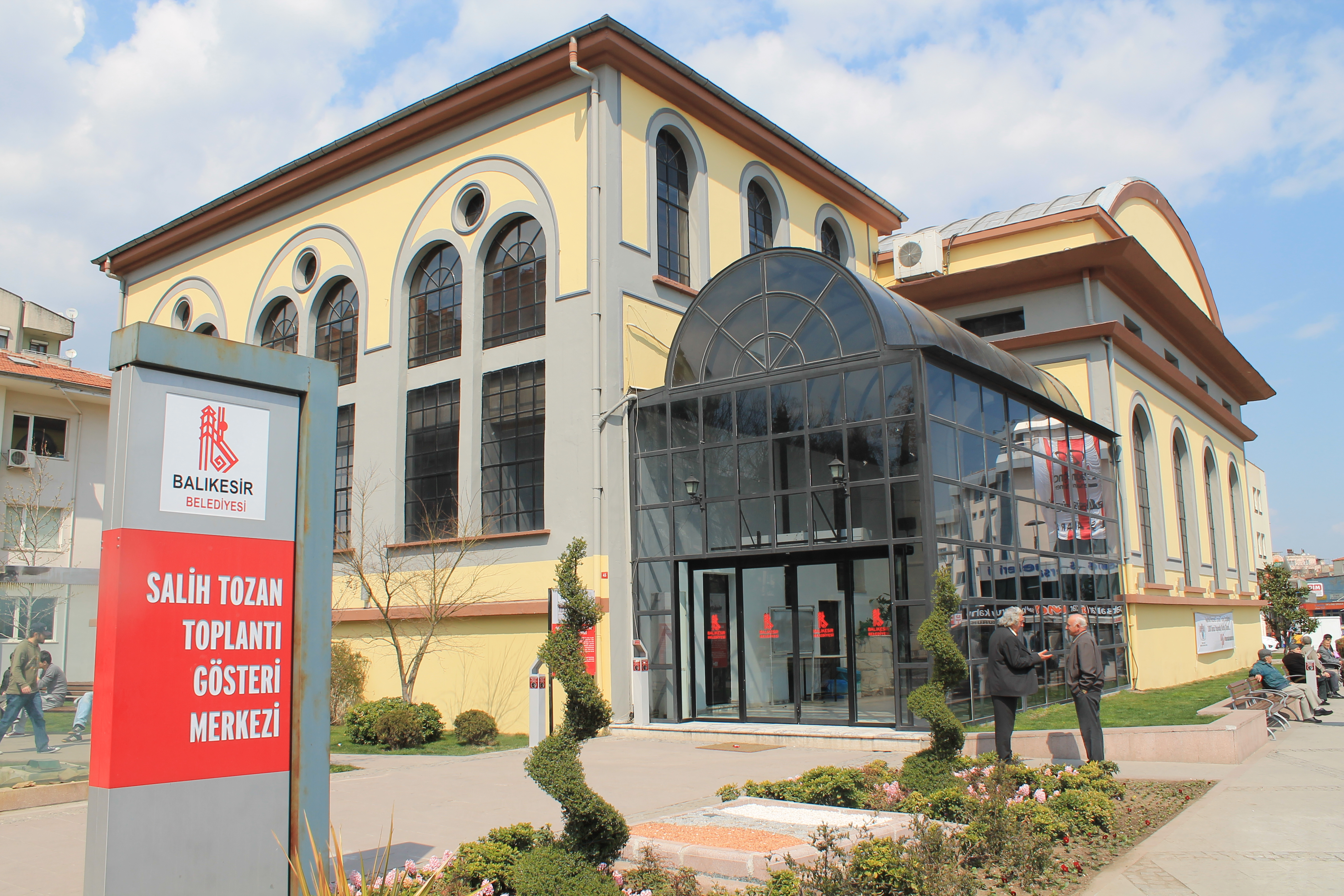
Salih Tozan Culture and Art Center

Many theatre players, actor, actress, singer and painter were born in Balıkesir. Most known are;

- Fikret Hakan – Actor
- Şevket Altuğ - Actor
- Necdet Tosun - Actor
- Tamer Yigit - Actor
- İlker Ayrık - Actor
- Barış Falay - Actor
- Hande Erçel - Actress and model
- Zerrin Tekindor - Actress and artist
- Tuğçe Kazaz - Actress and model

=== Memorial days ===
The major memorial days of Balıkesir are Hıdrellez, The Liberation Day and also The Remembrance Day of Local Combat.

Hıdrellez is by tradition celebrated in the first week of May for those who live in Balıkesir. Today, it is the fulfillment of a religious ritual that is celebrated as a day of goodness. The night on the streets there is a fire, and one of the traditions is to jump over the fire seven times. That night going to such green and restful areas as Değirmenboğazı and Balıkesir Park or near the religious area like tombs is also a ritual of Hıdrellez. People wish midnight and meet there. Accordingly, Hıdrellez day people have offerings. Drawing a picture of something that is desired to land or stone is determined. Individuals seeking goods put money into a red purse and hang it on a tree. On the other hand, those wishing for a baby type the name or draws baby figure on the ground. These rituals are traditions of Hıdrellez. One of the superstitions is that if someone takes a shower that night, they are protected from all diseases. Hıdrellez is a kind of Newroz or Spring New Years.

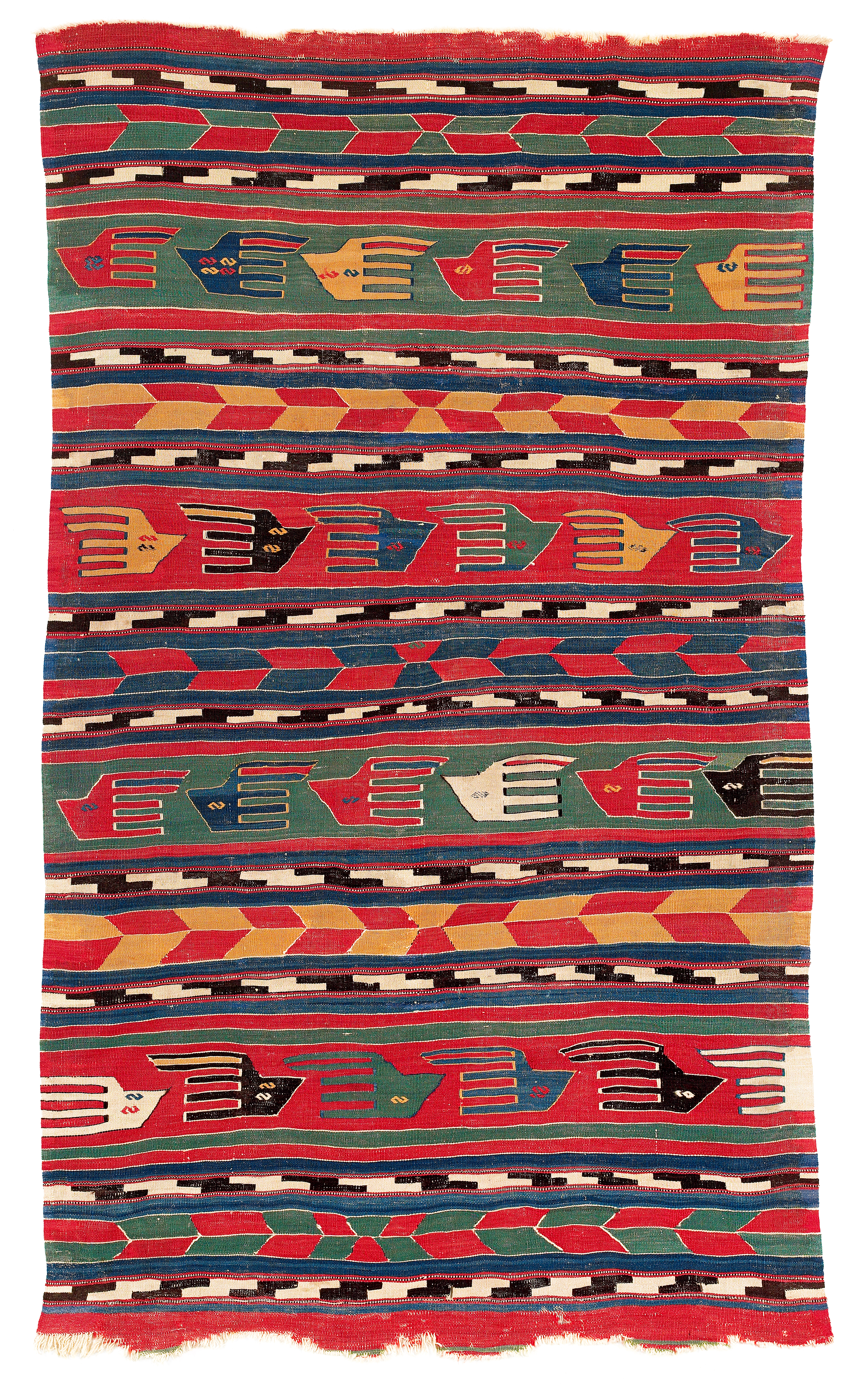
18th-century Caucasian Kilim, likely from Balıkesir Province

The Liberation Day from the enemy occupation of Balıkesir is on the 6th of September 1922, which every year is celebrated as a local holiday. There is a celebration parade and celebratory ceremony, the ceremony takes place on Stadium Street. In the past, the previous night of the 6th of September, the main streets of Balıkesir were washed with eau de cologne which is an aromatic lily, because lilies are a symbol of Balıkesir. This festival is celebrated with great enthusiasm, as for two or three days, the people would come from nearby villages and districts to celebrate. On the morning of the first day of the celebrations, people coming into Balıkesir would picnic in advance of the festival, at Balıkesir Park. During the festival evening, a great torchlight procession is organized. The TülüTabaklar show which is an important event unique to the city, is when people dressed up as the TülüTabaklar who were local heroes that resisted the enemies for 14 months during the Turkish War of Independence, as they were tanners and would dress up in goat or sheepskin with horsetails, chimney soot, bells and staff in order to present a frightening appearance.

The Remembrance Day of Local Combat is called Kuvayi Milliye Haftası in Turkish which is organized between 16 and 23 May. The great success with 41 Balıkesirer people met at Alaca Mescit and they have managed the region such as a state and gained a military victory in 1922. 15 May 1919, after the capture of İzmir by the Greeks, Balıkesir is the first place in Turkey that the reaction of Balıkesir had shown by declared Redd-i Ilhak (Disclamation of Annexation). In 1919, the city of Balikesir Congress was met five times. Greek soldiers on 30 June 1920 was occupied Balıkesir. By had opened Ayvalik-İvrindi-Soma-Balikesir-front, Balıkesir had its liberation. Traditional folk dancers in Balikesir

==== Cuisine ====
Balıkesir's local cheese, called Kelle Peyniri, is known in European countries and exported France, Germany and Britain. It is a granular type of cheese. Hoşmerim which is made from cheese and egg is the popular dessert of this city. Many old Turkmen dishes (like keşkek, güveç, tirit, mantı, kaymaklı) are composed of Balıkesir cuisine.

Etli çorba is another dish common in Balıkesir. It is similar to kelle paça (Khash) and düğün çorbası, and is a calorie-dense soup with lots of fats and meat.

==== Souvenirs ====
The main souvenir of the city is lily cologne and hoşmerim. Balıkesir's Turkmen carpets (called Yağcıbedir) are another popular local good. Sındırgı is a region popular for the weaving of this Turkish carpets. The rugs of Yağcıbedir are among the most prized in the country.

==== Traditional folk dances ====
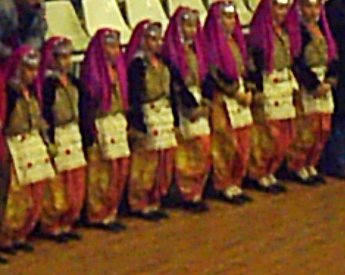
Balıkesir plainness' folkloric traditional woman customs

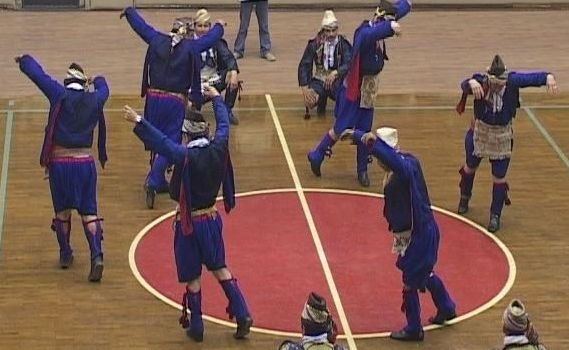
Balıkesir zeibeks play their zeibek dance

Balıkesir is a historical folkloric dance source. Balıkesir's historical folkloric dance is most popular in Turkey and academical searching. Bengi, Guvende and Balikesir Zeybeği are a typical dance of this city. These dances' figures spread throughout Balıkesir plainness. Also, Balikesir's ballads are popular in Turkey. Akpınar, Mendili Oyaladım, Karyolamın Demiri are some ballads sing by women surround Balikesir city. Like these woman ballads, on the other hand, have dance figures in terms of traditional dancing. Although Balıkesir is an industrial region, traditional village culture is superb and deeply. So, for folk culture, Balıkesir is an important area in Turkey. Balıkesir's local dance came to first in Nice folk festival joined 21 countries at 1958 be of value by European academical folklore authorities. Also, Balıkesir's local zeibek dance was the first zeibek participation from Turkey which had seen European folk authorities. Nowadays, Balıkesir folklore is chosen "intangible cultural heritage" of Turkey by the Ministry of Culture and Tourism.

== 2025 earthquake ==
At 4:43 PM UTC (7:43 pm Istanbul time) on Sunday, 10 August 2025, a magnitude 6.1 earthquake struck the province, centered 10 km SSW of Bigadiç, causing damage in the town of Sindirgi and surrounding villages, where sixteen buildings collapsed.

== See also ==
- Balıkesir
- Marmara region
