= List of populated places in Balıkesir Province =

Places in Turkey

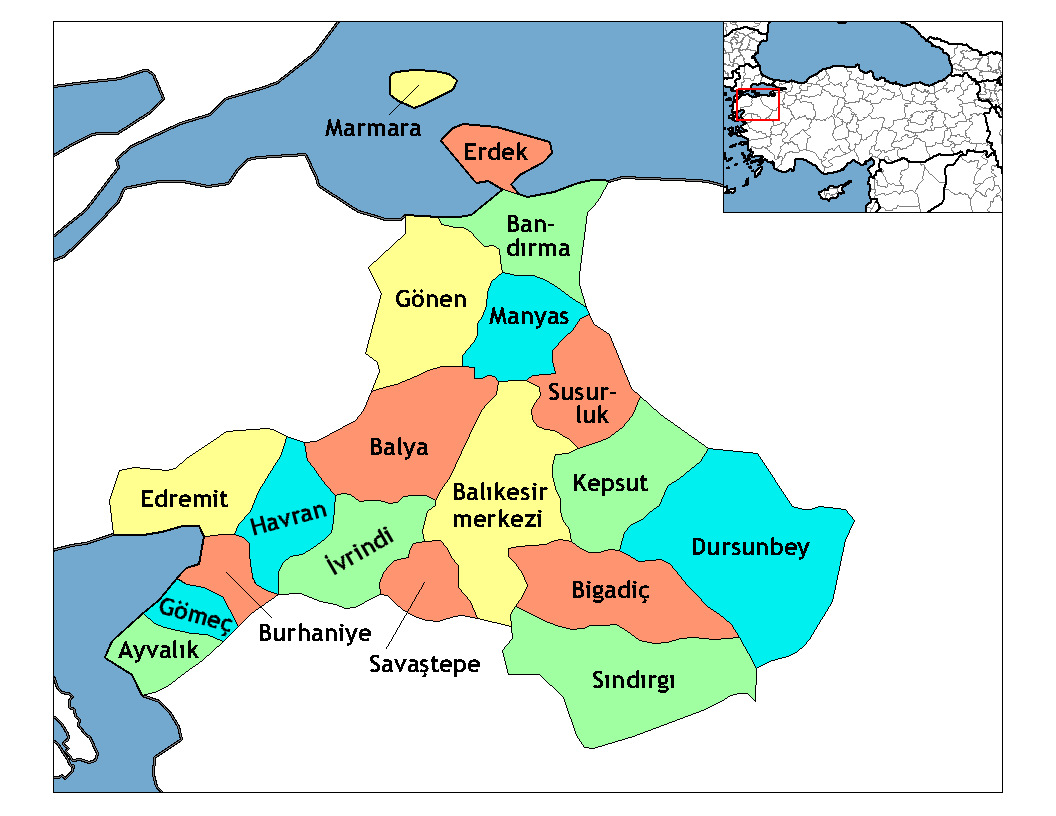
Manisa Province

Below is the list of populated places in Balıkesir Province, Turkey by the ilçes (districts). In the following lists first place in each list is the administrative center of the district.

== Altıeylül ==
- Altıeylül
- Akarsu, Altıeylül
- Akçakaya, Altıeylül
- Akçaköy, Altıeylül
- Aliağa, Altıeylül
- Aslıhan, Altıeylül
- Aslıhan Tepecik, Altıeylül
- Ataköy, Altıeylül
- Atköy, Altıeylül
- Aynaoğlu, Altıeylül
- Ayşebacı, Altıeylül
- Ayvacık, Altıeylül
- Ayvatlar, Altıeylül
- Bağalan, Altıeylül
- Bahçedere, Altıeylül
- Balıklı, Altıeylül
- Bayat, Altıeylül
- Bereketli, Altıeylül
- Beşpınar, Altıeylül
- Bigatepe, Altıeylül
- Bozen, Altıeylül
- Büyük Bostancı, Altıeylül
- Cinge, Altıeylül
- Çakıllık, Altıeylül
- Çamköy, Altıeylül
- Çandır, Altıeylül
- Çayırhisar, Altıeylül
- Çınarlıdere, Altıeylül
- Çiçekpınar, Altıeylül
- Çiftçidere, Altıeylül
- Çiftlik, Altıeylül
- Çukur Hüseyin, Altıeylül
- Dallımandıra, Altıeylül
- Dedeburnu, Altıeylül
- Dereçiftlik, Altıeylül
- Dereköy, Altıeylül
- Dişbudak, Altıeylül
- Ertuğrul, Altıeylül
- Gökçeören, Altıeylül
- Gökköy, Altıeylül
- Halalca, Altıeylül
- İnkaya, Altıeylül
- Kabaklı, Altıeylül
- Karabeyler, Altıeylül
- Karakavak, Altıeylül
- Karakaya, Altıeylül
- Karamanköy, Altıeylül
- Karamanlar, Altıeylül
- Kılcılar, Altıeylül
- Kirazköy, Altıeylül
- Kirazpınar, Altıeylül
- Konakpınar, Altıeylül
- Kozderegüvem, Altıeylül
- Kozören, Altıeylül
- Köseler, Altıeylül
- Köylüköy, Altıeylül
- Kuşkaya, Altıeylül
- Kutludüğün, Altıeylül
- Kuyualan, Altıeylül
- Küçük Bostancı, Altıeylül
- Küpeler, Altıeylül
- Kürse, Altıeylül
- Macarlar, Altıeylül
- Meryemdere, Altıeylül
- Orhanlı, Altıeylül
- Ortamandıra, Altıeylül
- Ovabayındır, Altıeylül
- Ovaköy, Altıeylül
- Pamukçu, Altıeylül
- Paşaköy, Altıeylül
- Sarıalan, Altıeylül
- Selimiye, Altıeylül
- Sıvatpınar, Altıeylül
- Taşköy, Altıeylül
- Taşpınar, Altıeylül
- Tayyipler, Altıeylül
- Turnalar, Altıeylül
- Türkali, Altıeylül
- Yakupköy, Altıeylül
- Yenice, Altıeylül
- Yeşiller, Altıeylül
- Yeşilyurt, Altıeylül

== Karesi ==
- Karesi
- Aktarma, Karesi
- Alacabayır, Karesi
- Armutalan, Karesi
- Bakacak, Karesi
- Beyköy, Karesi
- Boğazköy, Karesi
- Büyükpınar, Karesi
- Çanacık, Karesi
- Çaypınar, Karesi
- Davutlar, Karesi
- Deliktaş, Karesi
- Düzoba, Karesi
- Fethiye, Karesi
- Halkapınar, Karesi
- Hisaralan, Karesi
- İbirler, Karesi
- Kabakdere, Karesi
- Kalaycılar, Karesi
- Karacaören, Karesi
- Karakol, Karesi
- Kavaklı, Karesi
- Kırmızılar, Karesi
- Kocaavşar, Karesi
- Köteyli, Karesi
- Kurtdere, Karesi
- Naipli, Karesi
- Ortaca, Karesi
- Ovacık, Karesi
- Şamlı, Karesi
- Taşkesiği, Karesi
- Tatlıpınar, Karesi
- Toybelen, Karesi
- Turplu, Karesi
- Üçpınar, Karesi
- Yağcılar, Karesi
- Yaylabayır, Karesi
- Yaylacık, Karesi
- Yeni İskender, Karesi
- Yeniköy, Karesi
- Yeroluk, Karesi
- Yeşilova, Karesi
- Ziyaretli, Karesi

== Ayvalık ==
- Ayvalık
- Akçapınar, Ayvalık
- Altınova, Ayvalık
- Bağyüzü, Ayvalık
- Beşiktepe, Ayvalık
- Bulutçeşme, Ayvalık
- Çakmak, Ayvalık
- Çamoba, Ayvalık
- Hacıveliler, Ayvalık
- Karaayıt, Ayvalık
- Kırcalar, Ayvalık
- Küçükköy, Ayvalık
- Murateli, Ayvalık
- Mutlu, Ayvalık
- Odaburnu, Ayvalık
- Tıfıllar, Ayvalık
- Türközü, Ayvalık
- Üçkabaağaç, Ayvalık
- Yeniköy, Ayvalık

== Balya ==
- Balya
- Akbaş, Balya
- Alidemirci, Balya
- Bengiler, Balya
- Çakallar, Balya
- Çalova, Balya
- Çamavşar, Balya
- Çamucu, Balya
- Çiğdem, Balya
- Çukurcak, Balya
- Dereköy, Balya
- Doğanlar, Balya
- Dörtyol, Balya
- Farsak, Balya
- Göktepe, Balya
- Habipler, Balya
- Hacıhüseyin, Balya
- Havutbaşı, Balya
- Kadıköy, Balya
- Kaşıkçı, Balya
- Kavakalanı, Balya
- Kocabük, Balya
- Medrese, Balya
- Müstecap, Balya
- Narlı, Balya
- Patlak, Balya
- Semizköy, Balya
- Yaylacık, Balya
- Yazlık, Balya
- Danişment, Balya
- Değirmendere, Balya
- Göloba, Balya
- Kayapınar, Balya
- Koyuneri, Balya
- Mancılık, Balya
- Orhanlar, Balya
- Örenköy, Balya
- Gökmusa, Balya
- Ilıca, Balya
- Karacahisar, Balya
- Karlık, Balya
- Kayalar, Balya
- Söbücealan, Balya
- Yarışalanı, Balya
- Yenikavak, Balya

== Bandırma ==
- Bandırma
- Akçapınar, Bandırma
- Aksakal, Bandırma
- Bereketli, Bandırma
- Beyköy, Bandırma
- Bezirci, Bandırma
- Çakılköy, Bandırma
- Çarıkköy, Bandırma
- Çepni, Bandırma
- Çinge, Bandırma
- Dedeoba, Bandırma
- Doğa, Bandırma
- Doğanpınar, Bandırma
- Doğruca, Bandırma
- Dutliman, Bandırma
- Edincik, Bandırma
- Emre, Bandırma
- Ergili, Bandırma
- Erikli, Bandırma
- Eskiziraatli, Bandırma
- Gölyaka, Bandırma
- Hıdırköy, Bandırma
- Kirazlı, Bandırma
- Kuşcenneti, Bandırma
- Külefli, Bandırma
- Mahbubeler, Bandırma
- Misakça, Bandırma
- Orhaniye, Bandırma
- Ömerli, Bandırma
- Şirinçavuş, Bandırma
- Yenice, Bandırma
- Yenisığırcı, Bandırma
- Yeniyenice, Bandırma
- Yeniziraatli, Bandırma
- Yeşilçomlu, Bandırma

== Bigadiç ==
- Bigadiç
- Adalı, Bigadiç
- Akyar, Bigadiç
- Alanköy, Bigadiç
- Altınlar, Bigadiç
- Aşağıçamlı, Bigadiç
- Aşağıgöcek, Bigadiç
- Babaköy, Bigadiç
- Bademli, Bigadiç
- Balatlı, Bigadiç
- Başçeşme, Bigadiç
- Beğendikler, Bigadiç
- Bekirler, Bigadiç
- Bozbük, Bigadiç
- Çağış, Bigadiç
- Çaldere, Bigadiç
- Çamköy, Bigadiç
- Çayüstü, Bigadiç
- Çekirdekli, Bigadiç
- Çeribaşı, Bigadiç
- Çıtak, Bigadiç
- Çömlekçi, Bigadiç
- Davutça, Bigadiç
- Davutlar, Bigadiç
- Dedeçınar, Bigadiç
- Değirmenli, Bigadiç
- Dikkonak, Bigadiç
- Doğançam, Bigadiç
- Durasılar, Bigadiç
- Dündarcık, Bigadiç
- Elyapan, Bigadiç
- Emirler, Bigadiç
- Esenli, Bigadiç
- Güvemçetmi, Bigadiç
- Hacıömerderesi, Bigadiç
- Hamidiye, Bigadiç
- Hisarköy, Bigadiç
- Işıklar, Bigadiç
- İğciler, Bigadiç
- İlyaslar, Bigadiç
- İskeleköy, Bigadiç
- Kadıköy, Bigadiç
- Kalafat, Bigadiç
- Karabahçe, Bigadiç
- Kargın, Bigadiç
- Kayalıdere, Bigadiç
- Kayırlar, Bigadiç
- Kırca, Bigadiç
- Kızılçukur, Bigadiç
- Kozpınar, Bigadiç
- Köseler, Bigadiç
- Küçükyeniköy, Bigadiç
- Kürsü, Bigadiç
- Mecidiye, Bigadiç
- Meyvalı, Bigadiç
- Okçular, Bigadiç
- Okçularyeri, Bigadiç
- Osmanca, Bigadiç
- Özgören, Bigadiç
- Panayır, Bigadiç
- Salmanlı, Bigadiç
- Topalak, Bigadiç
- Tozağan, Bigadiç
- Turfullar, Bigadiç
- Yağcıbedir, Bigadiç
- Yağcılar, Bigadiç
- Yeniköy, Bigadiç
- Yeşildere, Bigadiç
- Yolbaşı, Bigadiç
- Yukarıçamlı, Bigadiç
- Yukarıgöçek, Bigadiç
- Yürücekler, Bigadiç

== Burhaniye ==
- Burhaniye
- Ağacık, Burhaniye
- Avunduk, Burhaniye
- Bahadınlı, Burhaniye
- Börezli, Burhaniye
- Çallı, Burhaniye
- Çamtepe, Burhaniye
- Çoruk, Burhaniye
- Damlalı, Burhaniye
- Dutluca, Burhaniye
- Hacıbozlar, Burhaniye
- Hisarköy, Burhaniye
- Karadere, Burhaniye
- Kırtık, Burhaniye
- Kızıklı, Burhaniye
- Kurucaoluk, Burhaniye
- Kuyucak, Burhaniye
- Kuyumcu, Burhaniye
- Pelitköy, Burhaniye
- Sübeylidere, Burhaniye
- Şahinler, Burhaniye
- Şarköy, Burhaniye
- Tahtacı, Burhaniye
- Taylıeli, Burhaniye
- Yabancılar, Burhaniye
- Yaylacık, Burhaniye
- Yunuslar, Burhaniye

== Dursunbey ==
- Dursunbey
- Adaören, Dursunbey
- Akbaşlar, Dursunbey
- Akçagüney, Dursunbey
- Akyayla, Dursunbey
- Alaçam, Dursunbey
- Alagüney, Dursunbey
- Arıklar, Dursunbey
- Aşağımusalar, Dursunbey
- Aşağıyağcılar, Dursunbey
- Ayvacık, Dursunbey
- Aziziye, Dursunbey
- Bayıryüzügüney, Dursunbey
- Beyce, Dursunbey
- Beyel, Dursunbey
- Boyalıca, Dursunbey
- Büyükakçaalan, Dursunbey
- Çakırca, Dursunbey
- Çaltıcak, Dursunbey
- Çamharman, Dursunbey
- Çamköy, Dursunbey
- Çanakçı, Dursunbey
- Çatalçam, Dursunbey
- Çelikler, Dursunbey
- Çınarköy, Dursunbey
- Dada, Dursunbey
- Değirmenciler, Dursunbey
- Delice, Dursunbey
- Demirciler, Dursunbey
- Dereköy, Dursunbey
- Doğancılar, Dursunbey
- Durabeyler, Dursunbey
- Ericek, Dursunbey
- Gazellidere, Dursunbey
- Göbül, Dursunbey
- Gökçedağ, Dursunbey
- Gökçepınar, Dursunbey
- Gölcük, Dursunbey
- Güğü, Dursunbey
- Gürleyen, Dursunbey
- Hacıahmetpınarı, Dursunbey
- Hacılar, Dursunbey
- Hacıömerler, Dursunbey
- Hamzacık, Dursunbey
- Hasanlar, Dursunbey
- Hindikler, Dursunbey
- Hondular, Dursunbey
- Hopanlar, Dursunbey
- Işıklar, Dursunbey
- İrfaniye, Dursunbey
- İsmailler, Dursunbey
- Karagöz, Dursunbey
- Karakaya, Dursunbey
- Karamanlar, Dursunbey
- Karapınar, Dursunbey
- Kardeşler, Dursunbey
- Karyağmaz, Dursunbey
- Kavacık, Dursunbey
- Kavakköy, Dursunbey
- Kazimiye, Dursunbey
- Kızılcadere, Dursunbey
- Kızılöz, Dursunbey
- Kireç, Dursunbey
- Kumlu, Dursunbey
- Kurtlar, Dursunbey
- Kuzköy, Dursunbey
- Küçükakçaalan, Dursunbey
- Küçükler, Dursunbey
- Mahmudiye, Dursunbey
- Mahmutça, Dursunbey
- Meydançayırı, Dursunbey
- Mıcırlar, Dursunbey
- Naipler, Dursunbey
- Odaköy, Dursunbey
- Osmaniye, Dursunbey
- Örenköy, Dursunbey
- Poyracık, Dursunbey
- Ramazanlar, Dursunbey
- Resüller, Dursunbey
- Reşadiye, Dursunbey
- Saçayak, Dursunbey
- Sağırlar, Dursunbey
- Sakızköy, Dursunbey
- Sarısipahiler, Dursunbey
- Sarnıçköy, Dursunbey
- Sebiller, Dursunbey
- Selimağa, Dursunbey
- Sinderler, Dursunbey
- Süleler, Dursunbey
- Şabanlar, Dursunbey
- Şenköy, Dursunbey
- Tafak, Dursunbey
- Taşkesiği, Dursunbey
- Taşpınar, Dursunbey
- Tepeköy, Dursunbey
- Tezlik, Dursunbey
- Turnacık, Dursunbey
- Umurlar, Dursunbey
- Veliler, Dursunbey
- Yassıören, Dursunbey
- Yukarımusalar, Dursunbey
- Yukarıyağcılar, Dursunbey
- Yunuslar, Dursunbey

== Edremit ==
- Edremit
- Akçay, Edremit
- Altınoluk, Edremit
- Arıtaşı, Edremit
- Avcılar, Edremit
- Beyoba, Edremit
- Bostancı, Edremit
- Çamcı, Edremit
- Çamlıbel, Edremit
- Çıkrıkçı, Edremit
- Dereli, Edremit
- Doyran, Edremit
- Güre, Edremit
- Hacıarslanlar, Edremit
- Kadıköy, Edremit
- Kavlaklar, Edremit
- Kızılkeçili, Edremit
- Mehmetalan, Edremit
- Narlı, Edremit
- Ortaoba, Edremit
- Pınarbaşı, Edremit
- Tahtakuşlar, Edremit
- Yaşyer, Edremit
- Yaylaönü, Edremit
- Yolören, Edremit
- Zeytinli, Edremit

== Erdek ==
- Erdek
- Aşağıyapıcı, Erdek
- Balıklı, Erdek
- Ballıpınar, Erdek
- Belkıs, Erdek
- Çakıl, Erdek
- Çayağzı, Erdek
- Çeltikçi, Erdek
- Doğanlar, Erdek
- Hamamlı, Erdek
- Harmanlı, Erdek
- İlhan, Erdek
- Karşıyaka, Erdek
- Kestanelik, Erdek
- Narlı, Erdek
- Ocaklar, Erdek
- Ormanlı, Erdek
- Paşalimanı, Erdek
- Poyrazlı, Erdek
- Tatlısu, Erdek
- Turan, Erdek
- Tuzla, Erdek
- Yukarıyapıcı, Erdek

== Gömeç ==
- Gömeç
- Dursunlu, Gömeç
- Hacıhüseyinler, Gömeç
- Hacıoğlu, Gömeç
- Hacıosman, Gömeç
- Karaağaç, Gömeç
- Keremköy, Gömeç
- Kobaşlar, Gömeç
- Kumgedik, Gömeç
- Kuyualan, Gömeç
- Ulubeyler, Gömeç

== Gönen ==
- Gönen
- Akçapınar, Gönen
- Alacaoluk, Gönen
- Alaettin, Gönen
- Alaşar, Gönen
- Armutlu, Gönen
- Asmalıdere, Gönen
- Atıcıoba, Gönen
- Ayvalıdere, Gönen
- Babayaka, Gönen
- Bakırlı, Gönen
- Balcı, Gönen
- Balcıdede, Gönen
- Bayramiç, Gönen
- Beyoluk, Gönen
- Bostancı, Gönen
- Buğdaylı, Gönen
- Büyüksoğuklar, Gönen
- Canbaz, Gönen
- Çakmak, Gönen
- Çalıca, Gönen
- Çalıoba, Gönen
- Çatak, Gönen
- Çığmış, Gönen
- Çınarlı, Gönen
- Çınarpınar, Gönen
- Çifteçeşmeler, Gönen
- Çiftlikalan, Gönen
- Çobanhamidiye, Gönen
- Dereköy, Gönen
- Dışbudak, Gönen
- Dumanalan, Gönen
- Ekşidere, Gönen
- Fındıklı, Gönen
- Gaybular, Gönen
- Gebeçınar, Gönen
- Gelgeç, Gönen
- Geyikli, Gönen
- Gökçesu, Gönen
- Gündoğan, Gönen
- Güneşli, Gönen
- Hacımenteş, Gönen
- Hacıvelioba, Gönen
- Hafızhüseyinbey, Gönen
- Hasanbey, Gönen
- Havutça, Gönen
- Hodul, Gönen
- Ilıcak, Gönen
- Ilıcaoba, Gönen
- İncirli, Gönen
- Kalburcu, Gönen
- Kalfaköy, Gönen
- Kaplanoba, Gönen
- Karaağaçalan, Gönen
- Karalarçiftliği, Gönen
- Karasukabaklar, Gönen
- Kavakalan, Gönen
- Kavakoba, Gönen
- Keçeler, Gönen
- Kınalar, Gönen
- Killik, Gönen
- Kocapınar, Gönen
- Koçbayır, Gönen
- Korudeğirmen, Gönen
- Körpeağaç, Gönen
- Köteyli, Gönen
- Kumköy, Gönen
- Küçüksoğuklar, Gönen
- Küpçıktı, Gönen
- Muratlar, Gönen
- Ortaoba, Gönen
- Osmanpazar, Gönen
- Ömerler, Gönen
- Paşaçiftlik, Gönen
- Pehlivanhoca, Gönen
- Saraçlar, Gönen
- Sarıköy, Gönen
- Sebepli, Gönen
- Söğüt, Gönen
- Suçıktı, Gönen
- Şaroluk, Gönen
- Tahtalı, Gönen
- Taştepe, Gönen
- Turplu, Gönen
- Tuzakçı, Gönen
- Tütüncü, Gönen
- Ulukır, Gönen
- Üçpınar, Gönen
- Üzümlü, Gönen
- Yeniakçapınar, Gönen
- Yürükkeçidere, Gönen

== Havran ==
- Havran
- Büyükdere, Havran
- Büyükşapçı, Havran
- Çakırdere, Havran
- Çakmak, Havran
- Çamdibi, Havran
- Dereören, Havran
- Eğmir, Havran
- Eseler, Havran
- Fazlıca, Havran
- Halılar, Havran
- Hallaçlar, Havran
- Hüseyinbeşeler, Havran
- İnönü, Havran
- Kalabak, Havran
- Karalar, Havran
- Karaoğlanlar, Havran
- Kobaklar, Havran
- Kocadağ, Havran
- Kocaseyit, Havran
- Köylüce, Havran
- Küçükdere, Havran
- Küçükşapçı, Havran
- Sarnıç, Havran
- Tarlabaşı, Havran
- Taşarası, Havran
- Temaşalık, Havran
- Tepeoba, Havran

== İvrindi ==
- İvrindi
- Akçal, İvrindi
- Aşağıkaleoba, İvrindi
- Ayaklı, İvrindi
- Bozören, İvrindi
- Büyükfındık, İvrindi
- Büyükılıca, İvrindi
- Büyükyenice, İvrindi
- Çarkacı, İvrindi
- Çatalan, İvrindi
- Çelimler, İvrindi
- Çiçekli, İvrindi
- Çobanlar, İvrindi
- Çukurlar, İvrindi
- Çukuroba, İvrindi
- Değirmenbaşı, İvrindi
- Demirciler, İvrindi
- Döşeme, İvrindi
- Erdel, İvrindi
- Eriklikömürcü, İvrindi
- Evciler, İvrindi
- Gebeçınar, İvrindi
- Geçmiş, İvrindi
- Gökçeler, İvrindi
- Gökçeyazı, İvrindi
- Gömeniç, İvrindi
- Gözlüçayır, İvrindi
- Gümeli, İvrindi
- Hacıahmetler, İvrindi
- Haydar, İvrindi
- Hüseyinbeyobası, İvrindi
- Ilıcakpınar, İvrindi
- İkizce, İvrindi
- Karaçepiş, İvrindi
- Kaşağıl, İvrindi
- Kayapa, İvrindi
- Kılcılar, İvrindi
- Kına, İvrindi
- Kınık, İvrindi
- Kıpıklar, İvrindi
- Kiraz Ören, İvrindi
- Kışladere, İvrindi
- Kocaeli, İvrindi
- Kocaoba, İvrindi
- Korucu, İvrindi
- Kuşdere, İvrindi
- Küçükfındık, İvrindi
- Küçükılıca, İvrindi
- Küçükyenice, İvrindi
- Mallıca, İvrindi
- Osmanköy, İvrindi
- Osmanlar, İvrindi
- Pelitören, İvrindi
- Sarıca, İvrindi
- Sarıpınar, İvrindi
- Sofular, İvrindi
- Soğanbükü, İvrindi
- Susuzyayla, İvrindi
- Taşdibi, İvrindi
- Topuzlar, İvrindi
- Yağlılar, İvrindi
- Yaren, İvrindi
- Yeşilköy, İvrindi
- Yürekli, İvrindi

== Kepsut ==
- Kepsut
- Ahmetölen, Kepsut
- Akçakertil, Kepsut
- Akçaköy, Kepsut
- Alagüney, Kepsut
- Armutlu, Kepsut
- Bağtepe, Kepsut
- Bektaşlar, Kepsut
- Beyköy, Kepsut
- Bükdere, Kepsut
- Büyükkatrancı, Kepsut
- Çalkandil, Kepsut
- Dalköy, Kepsut
- Danahisar, Kepsut
- Darıçukuru, Kepsut
- Dedekaşı, Kepsut
- Dereli, Kepsut
- Dombaydere, Kepsut
- Durak, Kepsut
- Eşeler, Kepsut
- Eyüpbükü, Kepsut
- Göbel, Kepsut
- Gökköy, Kepsut
- Hotaşlar, Kepsut
- Işıklar, Kepsut
- İsaalan, Kepsut
- Kalburcu, Kepsut
- Karacaağaç, Kepsut
- Karacaören, Kepsut
- Karaçaltı, Kepsut
- Karagöz, Kepsut
- Karahaliller, Kepsut
- Kayacıklar, Kepsut
- Kayaeli, Kepsut
- Keçidere, Kepsut
- Kepekler, Kepsut
- Kızıloluk, Kepsut
- Küçükkatrancı, Kepsut
- Mahmudiye, Kepsut
- Mehmetler, Kepsut
- Mestanlar, Kepsut
- Mezitler, Kepsut
- Nusret, Kepsut
- Osmaniye, Kepsut
- Ovacık, Kepsut
- Örencik, Kepsut
- Örenharman, Kepsut
- Örenli, Kepsut
- Piyade, Kepsut
- Recep, Kepsut
- Saraç, Kepsut
- Sarıçayır, Kepsut
- Sarıfakılar, Kepsut
- Sayacık, Kepsut
- Seçdere, Kepsut
- Serçeören, Kepsut
- Servet, Kepsut
- Şeremetler, Kepsut
- Tekkeışıklar, Kepsut
- Tilkicik, Kepsut
- Tuzak, Kepsut
- Yaylabaşı, Kepsut
- Yeşildağ, Kepsut
- Yoğunoluk, Kepsut

== Manyas ==
- Manyas
- Akçaova, Manyas
- Boğazpınar, Manyas
- Bölceağaç, Manyas
- Cumhuriyet, Manyas
- Çakırca, Manyas
- Çal, Manyas
- Çamlı, Manyas
- Çataltepe, Manyas
- Çavuşköy, Manyas
- Darıca, Manyas
- Değirmenboğazı, Manyas
- Dereköy, Manyas
- Doğancı, Manyas
- Dura, Manyas
- Erecek, Manyas
- Eskiçatal, Manyas
- Eşen, Manyas
- Hacıibrahimpınarı, Manyas
- Hacıosman, Manyas
- Hacıyakup, Manyas
- Hamamlı, Manyas
- Haydar, Manyas
- Hekim, Manyas
- Işıklar, Manyas
- İrşadiye, Manyas
- Kalfa, Manyas
- Kapaklı, Manyas
- Karakabaağaç, Manyas
- Kayaca, Manyas
- Kızık, Manyas
- Kızıksa, Manyas
- Kocagöl, Manyas
- Koçoğlu, Manyas
- Kubaş, Manyas
- Kulak, Manyas
- Necip, Manyas
- Ören, Manyas
- Peynirkuyu, Manyas
- Salur, Manyas
- Soğuksu, Manyas
- Süleymanlı, Manyas
- Şevketiye, Manyas
- Tepecik, Manyas
- Yayla, Manyas
- Yeniköy, Manyas

== Marmara ==
- Marmara
- Asmalı, Marmara
- Avşa, Marmara
- Ekinlik, Marmara
- Gündoğdu, Marmara
- Saraylar, Marmara
- Topağaç, Marmara

== Savaştepe ==
- Savaştepe
- Akpınar, Savaştepe
- Ardıçlı, Savaştepe
- Aşağıdanişment, Savaştepe
- Beyköy, Savaştepe
- Bozalan, Savaştepe
- Çaltılı, Savaştepe
- Çamurlu, Savaştepe
- Çavlı, Savaştepe
- Çiftlikdere, Savaştepe
- Çukurçayır, Savaştepe
- Deveören, Savaştepe
- Dikmeler, Savaştepe
- Eğerci, Savaştepe
- Esenköy, Savaştepe
- Güvem, Savaştepe
- Güvemküçüktarla, Savaştepe
- Hıdırbalı, Savaştepe
- İsadere, Savaştepe
- Kalemköy, Savaştepe
- Karacalar, Savaştepe
- Karaçam, Savaştepe
- Karapınar, Savaştepe
- Kocabıyıklar, Savaştepe
- Kocaören, Savaştepe
- Koğukyurt, Savaştepe
- Kongurca, Savaştepe
- Kurudere, Savaştepe
- Madenmezarı, Savaştepe
- Mecidiye, Savaştepe
- Minnetler, Savaştepe
- Pelitcik, Savaştepe
- Sarıbeyler, Savaştepe
- Sarısüleymanlar, Savaştepe
- Sıtmapınar, Savaştepe
- Soğucak, Savaştepe
- Söğütçük, Savaştepe
- Söğütlügözle, Savaştepe
- Tavşancık, Savaştepe
- Türediler, Savaştepe
- Yazören, Savaştepe
- Yeşilhisar, Savaştepe
- Yolcupınarı, Savaştepe
- Yukarıdanişment, Savaştepe
- Yukarıkaraçam, Savaştepe
- Yunakdere, Savaştepe

== Sındırgı ==
- Sındırgı
- Akçakısrak, Sındırgı
- Aktaş, Sındırgı
- Alacaatlı, Sındırgı
- Alakır, Sındırgı
- Alayaka, Sındırgı
- Armutlu, Sındırgı
- Aslandede, Sındırgı
- Bayırlı, Sındırgı
- Bayraklı, Sındırgı
- Bulak, Sındırgı
- Bükrecik, Sındırgı
- Büyükdağdere, Sındırgı
- Çakıllı, Sındırgı
- Çaltılı, Sındırgı
- Çamalanı, Sındırgı
- Çaygören, Sındırgı
- Çayır, Sındırgı
- Çelebiler, Sındırgı
- Çıkrıkçı, Sındırgı
- Çılbırcı, Sındırgı
- Çoturtepe, Sındırgı
- Danaçayır, Sındırgı
- Dedeler, Sındırgı
- Derecikören, Sındırgı
- Devletlibaba, Sındırgı
- Düğüncüler, Sındırgı
- Düvertepe, Sındırgı
- Eğridere, Sındırgı
- Eşmedere, Sındırgı
- Gölcük, Sındırgı
- Gözören, Sındırgı
- Hisaralan, Sındırgı
- Ilıcalı, Sındırgı
- Işıklar, Sındırgı
- İbiller, Sındırgı
- İzzettin, Sındırgı
- Karaağaç, Sındırgı
- Karacalar, Sındırgı
- Karagür, Sındırgı
- Kepez, Sındırgı
- Kertil, Sındırgı
- Kınık, Sındırgı
- Kıranköy, Sındırgı
- Kızılgür, Sındırgı
- Kocabey, Sındırgı
- Kocakonak, Sındırgı
- Kocasinan, Sındırgı
- Kozlu, Sındırgı
- Küçükbükü, Sındırgı
- Küçükdağdere, Sındırgı
- Kürendere, Sındırgı
- Mandıra, Sındırgı
- Mumcuköy, Sındırgı
- Ormaniçi, Sındırgı
- Osmanlar, Sındırgı
- Pelitören, Sındırgı
- Pürsünler, Sındırgı
- Sinandede, Sındırgı
- Süller, Sındırgı
- Şahinkaya, Sındırgı
- Şapçı, Sındırgı
- Taşköy, Sındırgı
- Yaylabayır, Sındırgı
- Yaylacık, Sındırgı
- Yolcupınar, Sındırgı
- Yusufçamı, Sındırgı
- Yüreğil, Sındırgı

== Susurluk ==
- Susurluk
- Alibey, Susurluk
- Asmalıdere, Susurluk
- Aziziye, Susurluk
- Babaköy, Susurluk
- Balıklıdere, Susurluk
- Beyköy, Susurluk
- Bozen, Susurluk
- Buzağılık, Susurluk
- Danaveli, Susurluk
- Demirkapı, Susurluk
- Dereköy, Susurluk
- Duman, Susurluk
- Ekinlik, Susurluk
- Eminpınarı, Susurluk
- Göbel, Susurluk
- Gökçeağaç, Susurluk
- Gökçedere, Susurluk
- Günaydın, Susurluk
- Gürece, Susurluk
- Ilıcaboğazı, Susurluk
- İclaliye, Susurluk
- Kalfaköy, Susurluk
- Karaköy, Susurluk
- Karapürçek, Susurluk
- Kayalıdere, Susurluk
- Kayıkçı, Susurluk
- Kepekler, Susurluk
- Kiraz, Susurluk
- Kocapınar, Susurluk
- Kulat, Susurluk
- Kurucaoluk, Susurluk
- Muradiye, Susurluk
- Odalıdam, Susurluk
- Okçugöl, Susurluk
- Ömerköy, Susurluk
- Paşaköy, Susurluk
- Reşadiye, Susurluk
- Söğütçayır, Susurluk
- Söve, Susurluk
- Sultançayır, Susurluk
- Sülecek, Susurluk
- Ümiteli, Susurluk
- Yağcı, Susurluk
- Yahyaköy, Susurluk
- Yaylaçayır, Susurluk
- Yıldız, Susurluk

== Recent development ==
According to Law act no 6360, all Turkish provinces with a population more than 750 000, were renamed as metropolitan municipality. All districts in those provinces became second level municipalities and all villages in those districts were renamed as a neighborhoods . Thus the villages listed above are officially neighborhoods of Balıkesir.
