= Taşköy =

Taşköy is the name of several places :

- Taşköy, Altıeylül, a village in Balıkesir Province, Turkey
- Taşköy in the Nusaybin district of the Mardin Province of Turkey.
- Taşköy, a village formally in the district of Nicosia in Cyprus, divided by the military cease-fire “Green Line” of 1964, but left to the north of sector 1 (west of Nicosia city) of the United Nations Buffer Zone in Cyprus extended there in 1974 after the major invasion of Turkish troops up to the Green Line (turned into a de facto border between the two governments of Cyprus).
