= Recepköy =

Recepköy can refer to the following villages in Turkey:

- Recepköy, Çelikhan
- Recepköy, Kepsut
