= Macarlar =

Macarlar (literally "Hungarians" in Turkish) may refer to the following places in Turkey:

- Macarlar, Balıkesir, a village in the central (Balıkesir) district of Balıkesir Province
- Macarlar, Gerede, a village in the Gerede district of Bolu Province
