= Akarsu =

Akarsu is a Turkish surname. Notable people with the surname include:

- Barış Akarsu (1979–2007), Turkish rock musician
- Hikmet Temel Akarsu (born 1960), Turkish novelist, short-story writer, satirist and playwright
- Melisa Akarsu (Born 1993), Turkish female swimmer

== See also ==
- Akarsu, Ardanuç, a village in Ardanuç district of Artvin Province, Turkey
- Akarsu, Altıeylül, a village
- Akarsu, Karayazı
- Akarsu, Refahiye
- Akarsu, Tarsus, a village in Tarsus district of Mersin Province, Turkey
