= Habipler =

Habipler can refer to the following villages in Turkey:

- Habipler, Balya
- Habipler, Kahta
- Habipler, Kale
