= Süleler =

Süleler may refer to the following villages in Turkey:

- Süleler, Dursunbey
- Süleler, Kızılcahamam
