= Alaçam (disambiguation) =

Alaçam is a town and district of Samsun Province, Turkey.

Alaçam means "variegated pine" in Turkish. It may refer to:

- Alaçam, Mut, a village in Mut district of Mersin Province
- Alaçam, the brand of bottled water marketed by Nestlé Waters in Turkey
- Alaçam, Dursunbey
- Alaçam, Kestel
