= Odaköy =

Odaköy can refer to the following villages in Turkey:

- Odaköy, Dursunbey
- Odaköy, Sandıklı
