= Karacahisar =

Karacahisar can refer to the following places in Turkey:

- Karacahisar, Balya
- Karacahisar, Milas
- Karacahisar Castle
- Karaca Hisar
