= Hacıömerler =

Hacıömerler can refer to:

- Hacıömerler, Dursunbey
- Hacıömerler, Lapseki
