= Çukurcak =

Çukurcak may refer to the following villages in Turkey:

- Çukurcak, Balya
- Çukurcak, Sultandağı
