= Beyce =

Beyce can refer to the following villages in Turkey:

- Beyce, Bilecik
- Beyce, Dursunbey
