= Kazımiye =

Kazımiye can refer to the following villages in Turkey:

- Kazımiye, Dursunbey
- Kazimiye, Hopa
