= Göloba =

Göloba may refer to the following villages in Turkey:

- Göloba, Balya
- Göloba, Bayburt
