= Dereçiftlik =

Dereçiftlik can refer to:

- Dereçiftlik, Altıeylül
- Dereçiftlik, Honaz
