= Yenikavak =

Yenikavak can refer to the following villages in Turkey:

- Yenikavak, Balya
- Yenikavak, Kastamonu
