= Medrese, Balya =

Village in Turkey

Medrese
- Neighbourhood
- Location in Turkey Medrese (Marmara)
- Coordinates: 39°40′25″N 27°33′33″E
- Country: Turkey
- Province: Balıkesir
- District: Balya
- Population (2022): 87
- Time zone: UTC+3 (TRT)

Medrese is a neighbourhood in the municipality and district of Balya of Balıkesir Province in Turkey. Its population is 87 (2022).
