= Armutlu, Kepsut =

Village in Turkey

Armutlu
- Neighbourhood
- Location in Turkey Armutlu (Marmara)
- Coordinates: 39.752°N 28.118°E
- Country: Turkey
- Province: Balıkesir
- District: Kepsut
- Population (2022): 204
- Time zone: UTC+3 (TRT)

Armutlu is a neighbourhood in the municipality and district of Kepsut, Balıkesir Province in Turkey. Its population is 204 (2022).
