= Poyracık, Dursunbey =

Village in Turkey

Poyracık
- Neighbourhood
- Location in Turkey Poyracık (Marmara)
- Coordinates: 39°31′21″N 28°48′34″E
- Country: Turkey
- Province: Balıkesir
- District: Dursunbey
- Population (2022): 74
- Time zone: UTC+3 (TRT)

Poyracık is a neighbourhood in the municipality and district of Dursunbey, Balıkesir Province in Turkey. Its population is 74 (2022).
