= Balıklı, Altıeylül =

Village in Turkey

Balıklı
- Neighbourhood
- Location in Turkey Balıklı (Marmara)
- Coordinates: 39.635°N 28.034°E
- Country: Turkey
- Province: Balıkesir
- District: Altıeylül
- Population (2022): 1,658
- Time zone: UTC+3 (TRT)

Balıklı is a neighbourhood in the municipality and district of Altıeylül of Balıkesir Province in Turkey. Its population is 1,658 (2022).
