= Yassıören, Dursunbey =

Yassıören
- Neighbourhood
- Location in Turkey Yassıören (Marmara)
- Coordinates: 39°25′18″N 28°48′10″E
- Country: Turkey
- Province: Balıkesir
- District: Dursunbey
- Population (2022): 162
- Time zone: UTC+3 (TRT)

Yassıören is a neighbourhood in the municipality and district of Dursunbey, Balıkesir Province, Turkey. Its population is 162 (2022).
