= Çınarköy, Dursunbey =

Village in Turkey

Çınarköy
- Neighbourhood
- Location in Turkey Çınarköy (Marmara)
- Coordinates: 39°36′27″N 28°46′55″E
- Country: Turkey
- Province: Balıkesir
- District: Dursunbey
- Population (2022): 233
- Time zone: UTC+3 (TRT)

Çınarköy is a neighbourhood in the municipality and district of Dursunbey, Balıkesir Province in Turkey. Its population is 233 (2022).
