= Çamucu, Balya =

Village in Turkey

Çamucu
- Neighbourhood
- Location in Turkey Çamucu (Marmara)
- Coordinates: 39°41′11″N 27°23′15″E
- Country: Turkey
- Province: Balıkesir
- District: Balya
- Population (2022): 386
- Time zone: UTC+3 (TRT)

Çamucu is a neighbourhood in the municipality and district of Balya of Balıkesir Province in Turkey. Its population is 386 (2022).
