= Ahmetölen, Kepsut =

Village in Turkey

Ahmetölen
- Neighbourhood
- Location in Turkey Ahmetölen (Marmara)
- Coordinates: 39°37′31″N 28°16′50″E
- Country: Turkey
- Province: Balıkesir
- District: Kepsut
- Population (2022): 71
- Time zone: UTC+3 (TRT)

Ahmetölen is a neighbourhood in the municipality and district of Kepsut, Balıkesir Province in Turkey. Its population is 71 (2022).
