= Karyağmaz, Dursunbey =

Village in Turkey

Karyağmaz
- Neighbourhood
- Location in Turkey Karyağmaz (Marmara)
- Coordinates: 39°45′26″N 28°40′56″E
- Country: Turkey
- Province: Balıkesir
- District: Dursunbey
- Population (2022): 107
- Time zone: UTC+3 (TRT)

Karyağmaz is a neighbourhood in the municipality and district of Dursunbey, Balıkesir Province in Turkey. Its population is 107 (2022).
