= Ayvacık, Dursunbey =

Village in Turkey

Ayvacık
- Neighbourhood
- Location in Turkey Ayvacık (Marmara)
- Coordinates: 39°34′01″N 28°49′07″E
- Country: Turkey
- Province: Balıkesir
- District: Dursunbey
- Population (2022): 155
- Time zone: UTC+3 (TRT)

Ayvacık is a neighbourhood in the municipality and district of Dursunbey, Balıkesir Province in Turkey. Its population is 155 (2022).
