= Turnacık, Dursunbey =

Village in Turkey

Turnacık
- Neighbourhood
- Location in Turkey Turnacık (Marmara)
- Coordinates: 39°27′09″N 28°49′46″E
- Country: Turkey
- Province: Balıkesir
- District: Dursunbey
- Population (2022): 191
- Time zone: UTC+3 (TRT)

Turnacık is a neighbourhood in the municipality and district of Dursunbey, Balıkesir Province in Turkey. Its population is 191 (2022).
