= Havutbaşı, Balya =

Village in Turkey

Havutbaşı
- Neighbourhood
- Location in Turkey Havutbaşı (Marmara)
- Coordinates: 39°47′08″N 27°28′17″E
- Country: Turkey
- Province: Balıkesir
- District: Balya
- Population (2022): 157
- Time zone: UTC+3 (TRT)

Havutbaşı is a neighbourhood in the municipality and district of Balya of Balıkesir Province in Turkey. Its population is 157 (2022).
