= Gökköy, Altıeylül =

Village in Turkey

Gökköy
- Neighbourhood
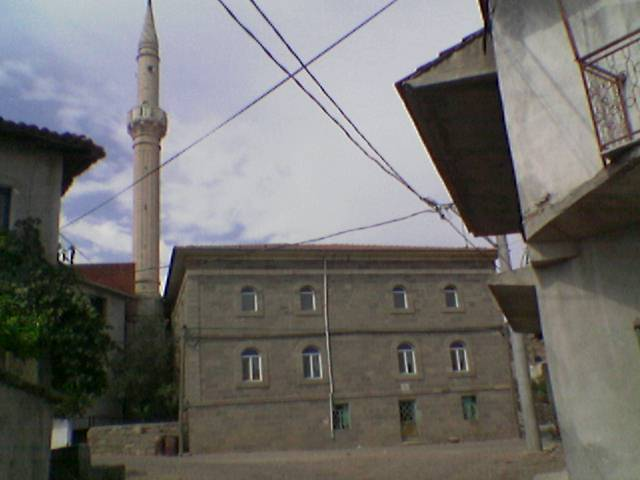

- Location within Turkey Location within Marmara
- Coordinates: 39.608°N 27.817°E
- Country: Turkey
- Province: Balıkesir
- District: Altıeylül
- Population (2022): 1,428
- Time zone: UTC+3 (TRT)

Gökköy is a neighbourhood in the municipality and district of Altıeylül of Balıkesir Province in Turkey. Its population is 1,428 (2022).
