= Küçükler, Dursunbey =

Village in Turkey

Küçükler
- Neighbourhood
- Location in Turkey Küçükler (Marmara)
- Coordinates: 39.550°N 28.328°E
- Country: Turkey
- Province: Balıkesir
- District: Dursunbey
- Population (2022): 86
- Time zone: UTC+3 (TRT)

Küçükler is a neighbourhood in the municipality and district of Dursunbey, Balıkesir Province in Turkey. Its population is 86 (2022).
