= Kocabük, Balya =

Village in Turkey

Kocabük
- Neighbourhood
- Location in Turkey Kocabük (Marmara)
- Coordinates: 39°37′36″N 27°33′10″E
- Country: Turkey
- Province: Balıkesir
- District: Balya
- Population (2022): 236
- Time zone: UTC+3 (TRT)

Kocabük is a neighbourhood in the municipality and district of Balya of Balıkesir Province in Turkey. Its population is 236 (2022).
