= Söbücealan, Balya =

Village in Turkey

Söbücealan
- Neighbourhood
- Location in Turkey Söbücealan (Marmara)
- Coordinates: 39°48′50″N 27°45′05″E
- Country: Turkey
- Province: Balıkesir
- District: Balya
- Population (2022): 54
- Time zone: UTC+3 (TRT)

Söbücealan is a neighbourhood in the municipality and district of Balya of Balıkesir Province in Turkey. Its population is 54 (2022).
