= Saçayak, Dursunbey =

Village in Turkey

Saçayak
- Neighbourhood
- Location in Turkey Saçayak (Marmara)
- Coordinates: 39.525°N 28.685°E
- Country: Turkey
- Province: Balıkesir
- District: Dursunbey
- Population (2022): 137
- Time zone: UTC+3 (TRT)

Saçayak is a neighbourhood in the municipality and district of Dursunbey, Balıkesir Province in Turkey. Its population is 137 (2022).
