= Şenköy, Dursunbey =

Village in Turkey

Şenköy
- Neighbourhood
- Location in Turkey Şenköy (Marmara)
- Coordinates: 39.421°N 28.941°E
- Country: Turkey
- Province: Balıkesir
- District: Dursunbey
- Population (2022): 184
- Time zone: UTC+3 (TRT)

Şenköy is a neighbourhood in the municipality and district of Dursunbey, Balıkesir Province in Turkey. Its population recorded to be at 184 (2022).
