= Çaltıcak, Dursunbey =

Village in Turkey

Çaltıcak
- Neighbourhood
- Location in Turkey Çaltıcak (Marmara)
- Coordinates: 39.595°N 28.930°E
- Country: Turkey
- Province: Balıkesir
- District: Dursunbey
- Population (2022): 41
- Time zone: UTC+3 (TRT)

Çaltıcak is a neighbourhood in the municipality and district of Dursunbey, Balıkesir Province in Turkey. Its population is 41 (2022).
