= Alagüney, Kepsut =

Village in Turkey

Alagüney
- Neighbourhood
- Location in Turkey Alagüney (Marmara)
- Coordinates: 39°48′58″N 28°21′23″E
- Country: Turkey
- Province: Balıkesir
- District: Kepsut
- Population (2022): 93
- Time zone: UTC+3 (TRT)

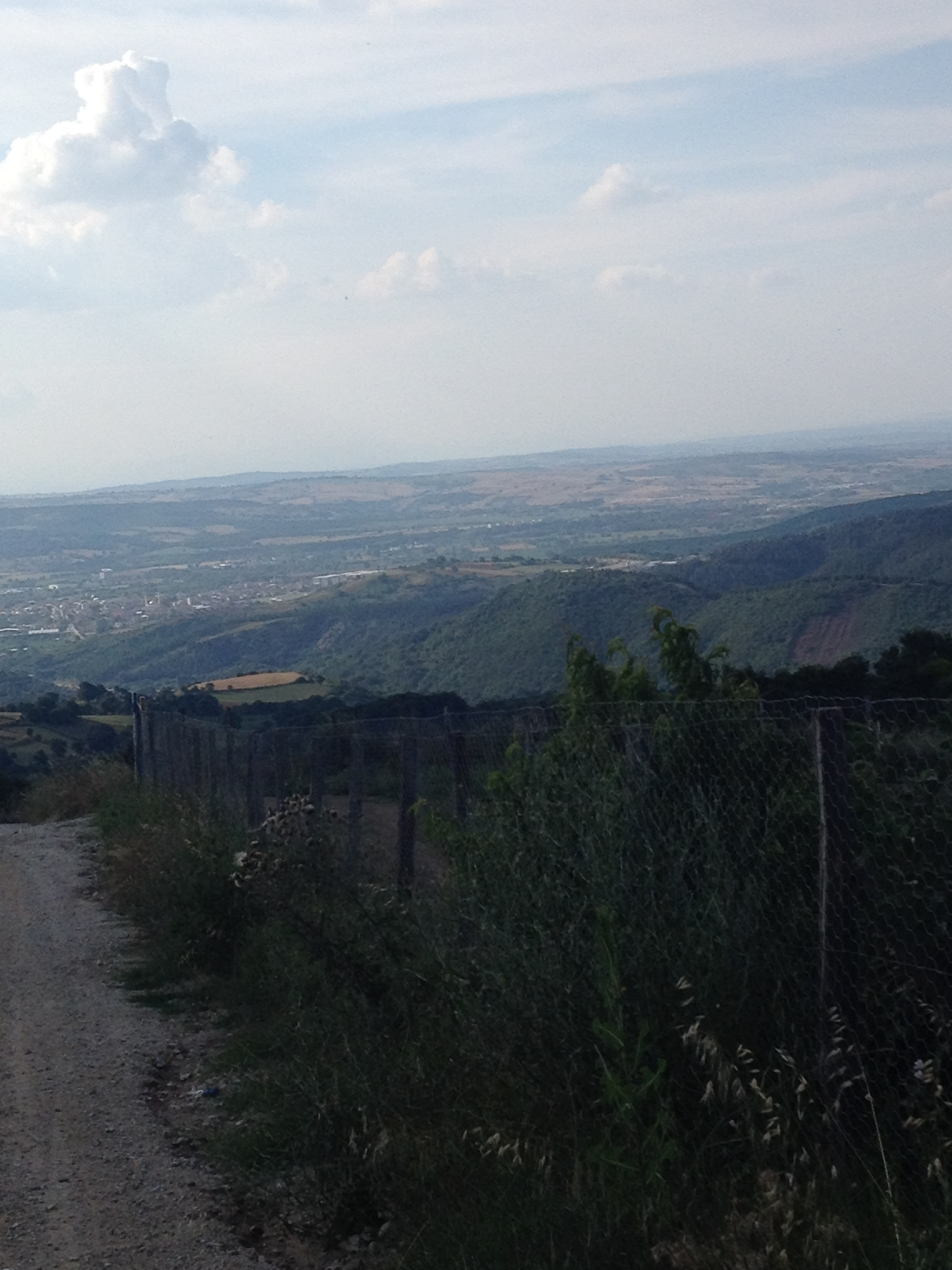
Alagüney

Alagüney is a neighbourhood in the municipality and district of Kepsut, Balıkesir Province in Turkey. Its population is 93 (2022).
