= Narlı, Balya =

Village in Turkey

Narlı
- Neighbourhood
- Location in Turkey Narlı (Marmara)
- Coordinates: 39.689°N 27.696°E
- Country: Turkey
- Province: Balıkesir
- District: Balya
- Population (2022): 262
- Time zone: UTC+3 (TRT)

Narlı is a neighbourhood in the municipality and district of Balya of Balıkesir Province in Turkey. Its population is 262 (2022).
