= Patlak, Balya =

Village in Turkey

Patlak
- Neighbourhood
- Location in Turkey Patlak (Marmara)
- Coordinates: 39°45′28″N 27°36′58″E
- Country: Turkey
- Province: Balıkesir
- District: Balya
- Population (2022): 53
- Time zone: UTC+3 (TRT)

Patlak is a neighbourhood in the municipality and district of Balya of Balıkesir Province in Turkey. Its population is 53 (2022).
