= Kızılcadere, Dursunbey =

Village in Turkey

Kızılcadere
- Neighbourhood
- Location in Turkey Kızılcadere (Marmara)
- Coordinates: 39°33′50″N 28°47′22″E
- Country: Turkey
- Province: Balıkesir
- District: Dursunbey
- Population (2022): 140
- Time zone: UTC+3 (TRT)

Kızılcadere is a neighbourhood in the municipality and district of Dursunbey, Balıkesir Province in Turkey. Its population is 140 (2022).
