= Örenköy, Balya =

Village in Turkey

Örenköy
- Neighbourhood
- Location in Turkey Örenköy (Marmara)
- Coordinates: 39.852°N 27.642°E
- Country: Turkey
- Province: Balıkesir
- District: Balya
- Population (2022): 166
- Time zone: UTC+3 (TRT)

Örenköy is a neighbourhood in the municipality and district of Balya of Balıkesir Province in Turkey. Its population is 166 (2022).
