= Mahmutça, Dursunbey =

Village in Turkey

Mahmutça
- Neighbourhood
- Location in Turkey Mahmutça (Marmara)
- Coordinates: 39°30′06″N 28°51′37″E
- Country: Turkey
- Province: Balıkesir
- District: Dursunbey
- Population (2022): 58
- Time zone: UTC+3 (TRT)

Mahmutça is a neighbourhood in the municipality and district of Dursunbey, Balıkesir Province in Turkey. Its population is 58 (2022).
