= Ramazanlar, Dursunbey =

Village in Turkey

Ramazanlar
- Neighbourhood
- Location in Turkey Ramazanlar (Marmara)
- Coordinates: 39.420°N 28.914°E
- Country: Turkey
- Province: Balıkesir
- District: Dursunbey
- Population (2022): 127
- Time zone: UTC+3 (TRT)

Ramazanlar is a neighbourhood in the municipality and district of Dursunbey, Balıkesir Province in Turkey. Its population is 127 (2022).
