= Kireç, Dursunbey =

Village in Turkey

Kireç
- Neighbourhood
- Location in Turkey Kireç (Marmara)
- Coordinates: 39.555°N 28.366°E
- Country: Turkey
- Province: Balıkesir
- District: Dursunbey
- Population (2022): 72
- Time zone: UTC+3 (TRT)

Kireç is a neighbourhood in the municipality and district of Dursunbey, Balıkesir Province in Turkey. Its population is 72 (2022).
