= Recepköy, Kepsut =

Village in Turkey

Recepköy
- Neighbourhood
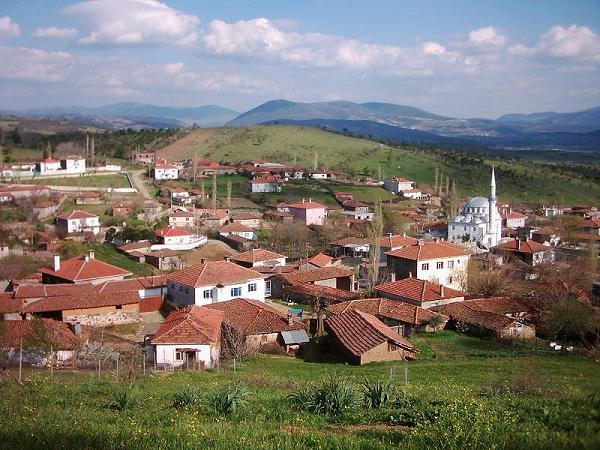

- Location within Turkey Location within Marmara
- Coordinates: 39.722°N 28.143°E
- Country: Turkey
- Province: Balıkesir
- District: Kepsut
- Population (2022): 202
- Time zone: UTC+3 (TRT)

Recepköy is a neighbourhood in the municipality and district of Kepsut, Balıkesir Province in Turkey. Its population is 202 (2022).
