= Kuzköy, Dursunbey =

Village in Turkey

Kuzköy
- Neighbourhood
- Location in Turkey Kuzköy (Marmara)
- Coordinates: 39.604°N 28.884°E
- Country: Turkey
- Province: Balıkesir
- District: Dursunbey
- Population (2022): 52
- Time zone: UTC+3 (TRT)

Kuzköy is a neighbourhood in the municipality and district of Dursunbey, Balıkesir Province in Turkey. Its population is 52 (2022).
