= Sakızköy, Dursunbey =

Village in Turkey

Sakızköy
- Neighbourhood
- Location in Turkey Sakızköy (Marmara)
- Coordinates: 39°28′50″N 28°48′15″E
- Country: Turkey
- Province: Balıkesir
- District: Dursunbey
- Population (2022): 104
- Time zone: UTC+3 (TRT)

Sakızköy is a neighbourhood in the municipality and district of Dursunbey, Balıkesir Province in Turkey. Its population is 104 (2022).
