= Hacılar, Dursunbey =

Village in Turkey

Hacılar
- Neighbourhood
- Location in Turkey Hacılar (Marmara)
- Coordinates: 39.640°N 28.622°E
- Country: Turkey
- Province: Balıkesir
- District: Dursunbey
- Population (2022): 148
- Time zone: UTC+3 (TRT)

Hacılar is a neighbourhood in the municipality and district of Dursunbey, Balıkesir Province in Turkey. Its population is 148 (2022).
