= Bağtepe, Kepsut =

Village in Turkey

Bağtepe
- Neighbourhood
- Location in Turkey Bağtepe (Marmara)
- Coordinates: 39.652°N 28.193°E
- Country: Turkey
- Province: Balıkesir
- District: Kepsut
- Population (2022): 176
- Time zone: UTC+3 (TRT)

Bağtepe is a neighbourhood in the municipality and district of Kepsut, Balıkesir Province in Turkey. Its population is 176 (2022).
