= Kavacık, Dursunbey =

Village in Turkey

Kavacık
- Neighbourhood
- Location in Turkey Kavacık (Marmara)
- Coordinates: 39.676°N 28.495°E
- Country: Turkey
- Province: Balıkesir
- District: Dursunbey
- Population (2022): 480
- Time zone: UTC+3 (TRT)

Kavacık is a neighbourhood in the municipality and district of Dursunbey, Balıkesir Province in Turkey. Its population is 480 (2022).
