= Küçükbostancı, Altıeylül =

Village in Turkey

Küçükbostancı
- Neighbourhood
- Location in Turkey Küçükbostancı (Marmara)
- Coordinates: 39°34′53″N 27°55′47″E
- Country: Turkey
- Province: Balıkesir
- District: Altıeylül
- Population (2022): 527
- Time zone: UTC+3 (TRT)

Küçükbostancı is a neighbourhood in the municipality and district of Altıeylül of Balıkesir Province in Turkey. Its population is 527 (2022).
