= Çiğdem, Balya =

Village in Turkey

Çiğdem
- Neighbourhood
- Location in Turkey Çiğdem (Marmara)
- Coordinates: 39°42′52″N 27°28′01″E
- Country: Turkey
- Province: Balıkesir
- District: Balya
- Population (2022): 94
- Time zone: UTC+3 (TRT)

Çiğdem is a neighbourhood in the municipality and district of Balya of Balıkesir Province in Turkey. Its population is 94 (2022).
