= Akbaş, Balya =

Village in Turkey

Akbaş
- Neighbourhood
- Location in Turkey Akbaş (Marmara)
- Coordinates: 39.657°N 27.527°E
- Country: Turkey
- Province: Balıkesir
- District: Balya
- Population (2022): 174
- Time zone: UTC+3 (TRT)

Akbaş is a neighbourhood in the municipality and district of Balya of Balıkesir Province in Turkey. Its population is 174 (2022).
