= Durabeyler, Dursunbey =

Village in Turkey

Durabeyler
- Neighbourhood
- Location in Turkey Durabeyler (Marmara)
- Coordinates: 39°40′14″N 28°36′31″E
- Country: Turkey
- Province: Balıkesir
- District: Dursunbey
- Population (2022): 822
- Time zone: UTC+3 (TRT)

Durabeyler is a neighbourhood in the municipality and district of Dursunbey, Balıkesir Province in Turkey. Its population is 822 (2022).
