= Kayaeli, Kepsut =

Village in Turkey

Kayaeli
- Neighbourhood
- Location in Turkey Kayaeli (Marmara)
- Coordinates: 39°45′24″N 28°18′33″E
- Country: Turkey
- Province: Balıkesir
- District: Kepsut
- Population (2022): 81
- Time zone: UTC+3 (TRT)

Kayaeli is a neighbourhood in the municipality and district of Kepsut, Balıkesir Province in Turkey. Its population is 81 (2022).
