= Gökçeören, Altıeylül =

Gökçeören
- Neighbourhood
- Location within Turkey Location within Marmara
- Coordinates: 39°45′N 28°05′E
- Country: Turkey
- Province: Balıkesir
- District: Altıeylül
- Population (2022): 578
- Time zone: UTC+3 (TRT)

Gökçeören is a neighbourhood of the municipality and district of Altıeylül, Balıkesir Province, Turkey. As of 2022, its population was 578.
