= Kayalar, Balya =

Village in Turkey

Kayalar
- Neighbourhood
- Location in Turkey Kayalar (Marmara)
- Coordinates: 39.830°N 27.672°E
- Country: Turkey
- Province: Balıkesir
- District: Balya
- Population (2022): 484
- Time zone: UTC+3 (TRT)

Kayalar is a neighbourhood in the municipality and district of Balya of Balıkesir Province in Turkey. Its population is 484 (2022).
