= Çalova, Balya =

Village in Turkey

Çalova
- Neighbourhood
- Location in Turkey Çalova (Marmara)
- Coordinates: 39°48′08″N 27°32′23″E
- Country: Turkey
- Province: Balıkesir
- District: Balya
- Population (2022): 213
- Time zone: UTC+3 (TRT)

Çalova is a neighbourhood in the municipality and district of Balya of Balıkesir Province in Turkey. Its population is 213 (2022).
