= Dada, Dursunbey =

Village in Turkey

Dada
- Neighbourhood
- Location in Turkey Dada (Marmara)
- Coordinates: 39°34′42″N 28°22′09″E
- Country: Turkey
- Province: Balıkesir
- District: Dursunbey
- Population (2022): 134
- Time zone: UTC+3 (TRT)

Dada is a neighbourhood in the municipality and district of Dursunbey, Balıkesir Province in Turkey. Its population is 134 (2022).
