= Bayıryüzügüney, Dursunbey =

Village in Turkey

Bayıryüzügüney
- Neighbourhood
- Location in Turkey Bayıryüzügüney (Marmara)
- Coordinates: 39°40′10″N 28°45′00″E
- Country: Turkey
- Province: Balıkesir
- District: Dursunbey
- Population (2022): 203
- Time zone: UTC+3 (TRT)

Bayıryüzügüney is a neighbourhood in the municipality and district of Dursunbey, Balıkesir Province in Turkey. Its population is 203 (2022).
