= Doğanlar, Balya =

Village in Turkey

Doğanlar
- Neighbourhood
- Location in Turkey Doğanlar (Marmara)
- Coordinates: 39.781°N 27.511°E
- Country: Turkey
- Province: Balıkesir
- District: Balya
- Population (2022): 374
- Time zone: UTC+3 (TRT)

Doğanlar is a neighbourhood in the municipality and district of Balya of Balıkesir Province in Turkey. Its population is 374 (2022).
