= Hacıahmetpınarı, Dursunbey =

Village in Turkey

Hacıahmetpınarı
- Neighbourhood
- Location in Turkey Hacıahmetpınarı (Marmara)
- Coordinates: 39.616°N 28.501°E
- Country: Turkey
- Province: Balıkesir
- District: Dursunbey
- Population (2022): 91
- Time zone: UTC+3 (TRT)

Hacıahmetpınarı is a neighbourhood in the municipality and district of Dursunbey, Balıkesir Province in Turkey. Its population is 91 (2022).
