= Bengiler, Balya =

Village in Turkey

Bengiler
- Neighbourhood
- Location in Turkey Bengiler (Marmara)
- Coordinates: 39°44′33″N 27°29′04″E
- Country: Turkey
- Province: Balıkesir
- District: Balya
- Population (2022): 351
- Time zone: UTC+3 (TRT)

Bengiler is a neighbourhood in the municipality and district of Balya of Balıkesir Province in Turkey. Its population is 351 (2022).
