= Çatalçam, Dursunbey =

Village in Turkey

Çatalçam
- Neighbourhood
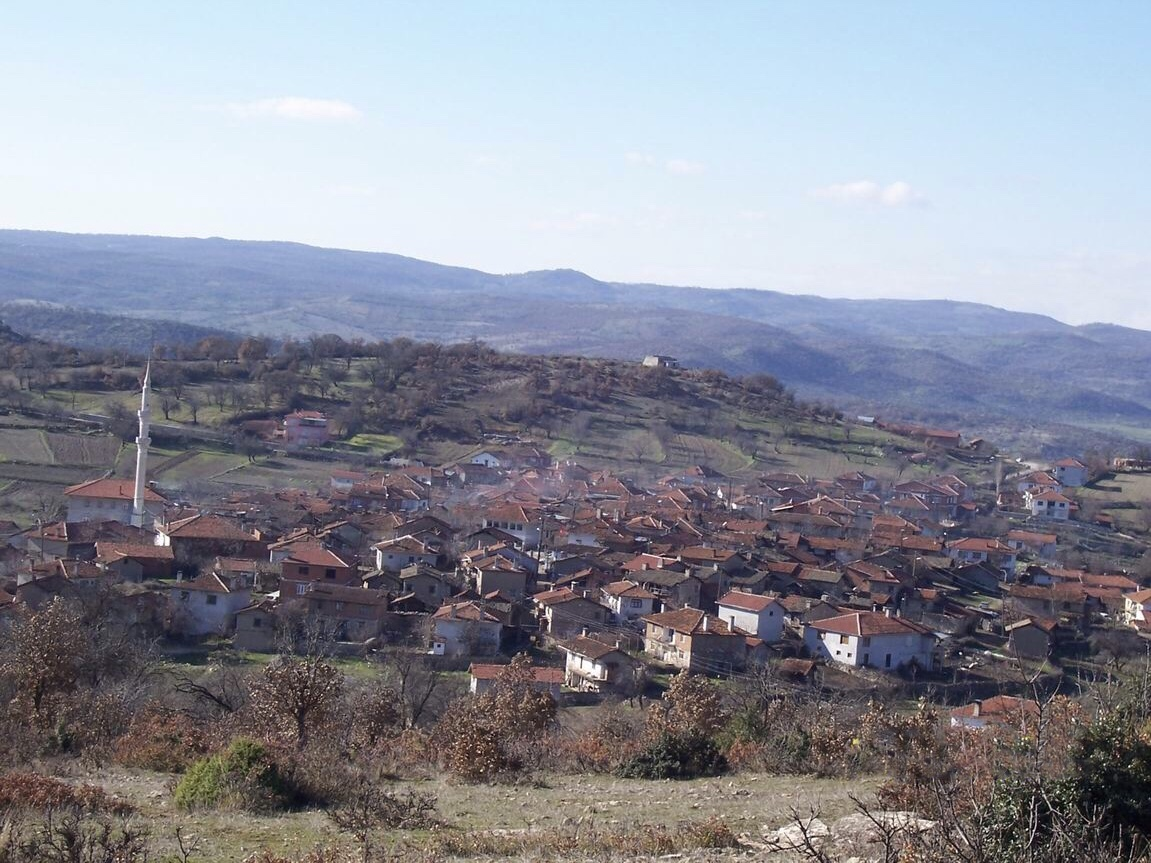

- Location within Turkey Location within Marmara
- Coordinates: 39.539°N 28.570°E
- Country: Turkey
- Province: Balıkesir
- District: Dursunbey
- Population (2022): 177
- Time zone: UTC+3 (TRT)

Çatalçam is a neighbourhood in the municipality and district of Dursunbey, Balıkesir Province in Turkey. Its population is 177 (2022).
