= Karlık, Balya =

Village in Turkey

Karlık
- Neighbourhood
- Location in Turkey Karlık (Marmara)
- Coordinates: 39°49′40″N 27°44′06″E
- Country: Turkey
- Province: Balıkesir
- District: Balya
- Population (2022): 63
- Time zone: UTC+3 (TRT)

Karlık is a neighbourhood in the municipality and district of Balya of Balıkesir Province in Turkey. Its population is 63 (2022).
