= Çakırca, Dursunbey =

Village in Turkey

Çakırca
- Neighbourhood
- Location in Turkey Çakırca (Marmara)
- Coordinates: 39.687°N 28.556°E
- Country: Turkey
- Province: Balıkesir
- District: Dursunbey
- Population (2022): 214
- Time zone: UTC+3 (TRT)

Çakırca is a neighbourhood in the municipality and district of Dursunbey, Balıkesir Province in Turkey. Its population is 214 (2022).
