= Alidemirci, Balya =

Village in Turkey

Alidemirci
- Neighbourhood
- Location in Turkey Alidemirci (Marmara)
- Coordinates: 39.714°N 27.680°E
- Country: Turkey
- Province: Balıkesir
- District: Balya
- Population (2022): 264
- Time zone: UTC+3 (TRT)

Alidemirci is a neighbourhood in the municipality and district of Balya of Balıkesir Province in Turkey. Its population is 264 (2022).
