= Tekkeışıklar, Kepsut =

Village in Turkey

Tekkeışıklar
- Neighbourhood
- Location in Turkey Tekkeışıklar (Marmara)
- Coordinates: 39°42′40″N 28°10′18″E
- Country: Turkey
- Province: Balıkesir
- District: Kepsut
- Population (2022): 149
- Time zone: UTC+3 (TRT)

Tekkeışıklar is a neighbourhood in the municipality and district of Kepsut, Balıkesir Province in Turkey. Its population is 149 (2022).
