= Göbül, Dursunbey =

Village in Turkey

Göbül
- Neighbourhood
- Location in Turkey Göbül (Marmara)
- Coordinates: 39°31′N 28°29′E
- Country: Turkey
- Province: Balıkesir
- District: Dursunbey
- Population (2022): 676
- Time zone: UTC+3 (TRT)

Göbül is a neighbourhood in the municipality and district of Dursunbey, Balıkesir Province in Turkey. Its population is 676 (2022).
