= Danişment, Balya =

Village in Turkey

Danişment
- Neighbourhood
- Location in Turkey Danişment (Marmara)
- Coordinates: 39.870°N 27.634°E
- Country: Turkey
- Province: Balıkesir
- District: Balya
- Population (2022): 460
- Time zone: UTC+3 (TRT)

Danişment is a neighbourhood in the municipality and district of Balya of Balıkesir Province in Turkey. Its population is 460 (2022).
