= Hasanlar, Dursunbey =

Village in Turkey

Hasanlar
- Neighbourhood
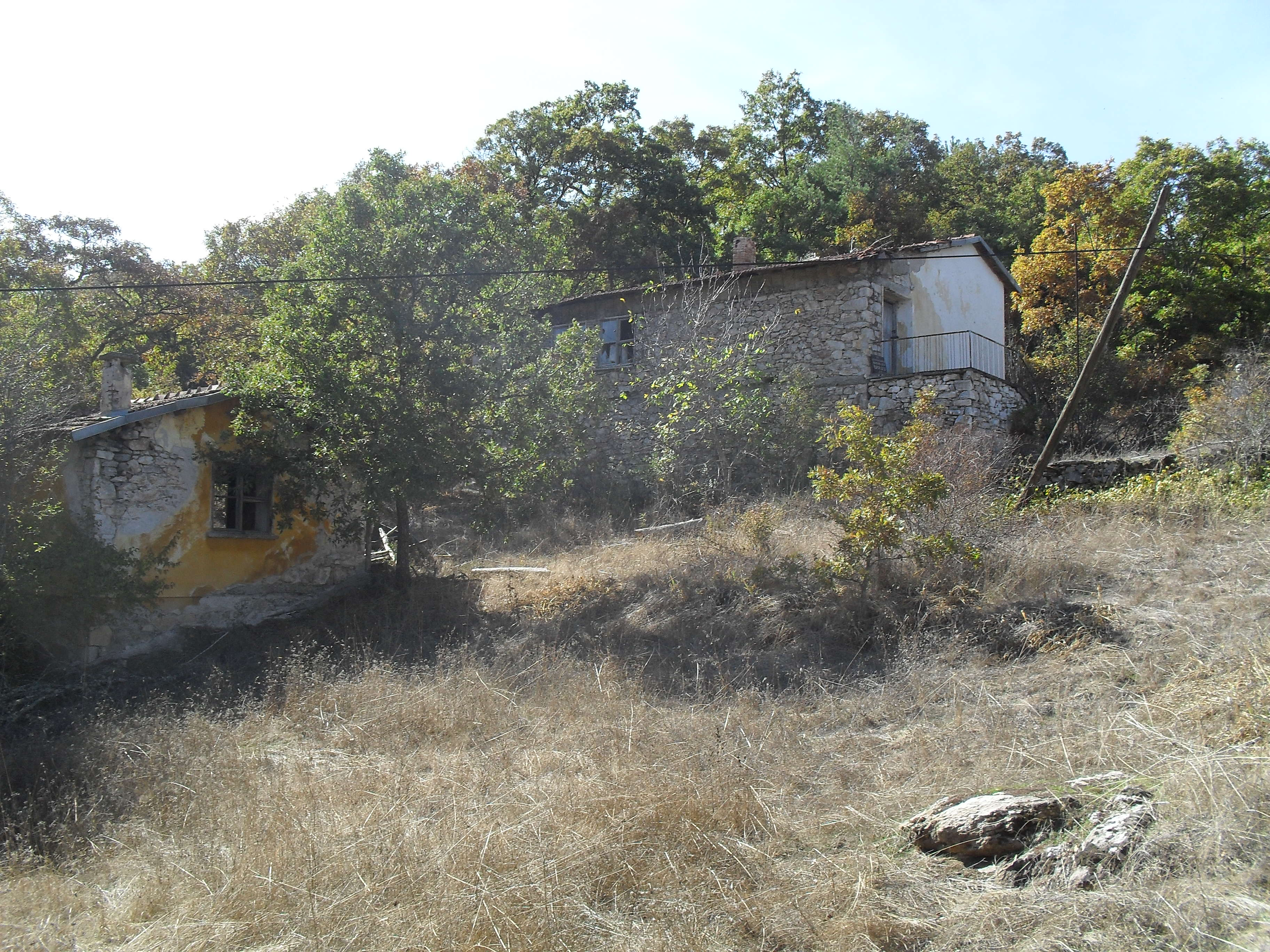

- Location within Turkey Location within Marmara
- Coordinates: 39°37′17″N 28°26′02″E
- Country: Turkey
- Province: Balıkesir
- District: Dursunbey
- Population (2022): 33
- Time zone: UTC+3 (TRT)

Hasanlar is a neighbourhood in the municipality and district of Dursunbey, Balıkesir Province in Turkey. Its population is 33 (2022).
