= Işıklar, Dursunbey =

Işıklar
- Neighbourhood
- Location in Turkey Işıklar (Marmara)
- Coordinates: 39.4577°N 28.8619°E
- Country: Turkey
- Province: Balıkesir
- District: Dursunbey
- Population (2022): 131
- Time zone: UTC+3 (TRT)

Işıklar is a neighbourhood in the municipality and district of Dursunbey, Balıkesir Province, Turkey. Its population is 131 (2022).
