= Karakaya, Altıeylül =

Village in Turkey

Karakaya
- Neighbourhood
- Location in Turkey Karakaya (Marmara)
- Coordinates: 39.736°N 28.025°E
- Country: Turkey
- Province: Balıkesir
- District: Altıeylül
- Population (2022): 97
- Time zone: UTC+3 (TRT)

Karakaya is a neighbourhood in the municipality and district of Altıeylül of Balıkesir Province in Turkey. Its population is 97 (2022).
