= Göktepe, Balya =

Village in Turkey

Göktepe
- Neighbourhood
- Location in Turkey Göktepe (Marmara)
- Coordinates: 39°41′30″N 27°31′45″E
- Country: Turkey
- Province: Balıkesir
- District: Balya
- Population (2022): 97
- Time zone: UTC+3 (TRT)

Göktepe is a neighbourhood in the municipality and district of Balya of Balıkesir Province in Turkey. Its population is 97 (2022).
