= Kurtlar, Dursunbey =

Village in Turkey

Kurtlar
- Neighbourhood
- Location in Turkey Kurtlar (Marmara)
- Coordinates: 39.538°N 28.625°E
- Country: Turkey
- Province: Balıkesir
- District: Dursunbey
- Population (2022): 139
- Time zone: UTC+3 (TRT)

Kurtlar is a neighbourhood in the municipality and district of Dursunbey, Balıkesir Province in Turkey. Its population is 139 (2022).
