= Kayapınar, Balya =

Village in Turkey

Kayapınar
- Neighbourhood
- Location in Turkey Kayapınar (Marmara)
- Coordinates: 39.829°N 27.596°E
- Country: Turkey
- Province: Balıkesir
- District: Balya
- Population (2022): 156
- Time zone: UTC+3 (TRT)

Kayapınar is a neighbourhood in the municipality and district of Balya of Balıkesir Province in Turkey. Its population is 156 (2022).
