= Semizköy, Balya =

Village in Turkey

Semizköy
- Neighbourhood
- Location in Turkey Semizköy (Marmara)
- Coordinates: 39°48′50″N 27°37′03″E
- Country: Turkey
- Province: Balıkesir
- District: Balya
- Population (2022): 97
- Time zone: UTC+3 (TRT)

Semizköy is a neighbourhood in the municipality and district of Balya of Balıkesir Province in Turkey. Its population is 97 (2022).
