= Dereköy, Dursunbey =

Village in Turkey

Dereköy
- Neighbourhood
- Location in Turkey Dereköy (Marmara)
- Coordinates: 39.55°N 28.90°E
- Country: Turkey
- Province: Balıkesir
- District: Dursunbey
- Population (2022): 70
- Time zone: UTC+3 (TRT)

Dereköy is a neighbourhood in the municipality and district of Dursunbey, Balıkesir Province in Turkey. Its population is 70 (2022).
