= Çamavşar, Balya =

Village in Turkey

Çamavşar
- Neighbourhood
- Location in Turkey Çamavşar (Marmara)
- Coordinates: 39°41′55″N 27°25′23″E
- Country: Turkey
- Province: Balıkesir
- District: Balya
- Population (2022): 578
- Time zone: UTC+3 (TRT)

Çamavşar is a neighbourhood in the municipality and district of Balya of Balıkesir Province in Turkey. Its population is 578 (2022).
