= Gökmusa, Balya =

Village in Turkey

Gökmusa
- Neighbourhood
- Location in Turkey Gökmusa (Marmara)
- Coordinates: 39.809°N 27.722°E
- Country: Turkey
- Province: Balıkesir
- District: Balya
- Population (2022): 112
- Time zone: UTC+3 (TRT)

Gökmusa is a neighbourhood in the municipality and district of Balya of Balıkesir Province in Turkey. Its population is 112 (2022).
