= Yukarımusalar, Dursunbey =

Village in Turkey

Yukarımusalar
- Neighbourhood
- Location in Turkey Yukarımusalar (Marmara)
- Coordinates: 39°29′22″N 28°32′14″E
- Country: Turkey
- Province: Balıkesir
- District: Dursunbey
- Population (2022): 169
- Time zone: UTC+3 (TRT)

Yukarımusalar is a neighbourhood in the municipality and district of Dursunbey, Balıkesir Province in Turkey. Its population is 169 (2022).
