= Kaşıkçı, Balya =

Village in Turkey

Kaşıkçı
- Neighbourhood
- Location in Turkey Kaşıkçı (Marmara)
- Coordinates: 39°42′27″N 27°31′19″E
- Country: Turkey
- Province: Balıkesir
- District: Balya
- Population (2022): 72
- Time zone: UTC+3 (TRT)

Kaşıkçı is a neighbourhood in the municipality and district of Balya of Balıkesir Province in Turkey. Its population is 72 (2022).
