= Tezlik, Dursunbey =

Village in Turkey

Tezlik
- Neighbourhood
- Location in Turkey Tezlik (Marmara)
- Coordinates: 39°35′50″N 28°53′47″E
- Country: Turkey
- Province: Balıkesir
- District: Dursunbey
- Population (2022): 86
- Time zone: UTC+3 (TRT)

Tezlik is a neighbourhood in the municipality and district of Dursunbey, Balıkesir Province in Turkey. Its population is 86 (2022).
