= Gökçedağ, Dursunbey =

Village in Turkey

Gökçedağ
- Neighbourhood
- Location in Turkey Gökçedağ (Marmara)
- Coordinates: 39°33′30″N 28°55′07″E
- Country: Turkey
- Province: Balıkesir
- District: Dursunbey
- Population (2022): 129
- Time zone: UTC+3 (TRT)

Gökçedağ is a neighbourhood in the municipality and district of Dursunbey, Balıkesir Province in Turkey. Its population is 129 (2022).
