= Akçaköy, Kepsut =

Village in Turkey

Akçaköy
- Neighbourhood
- Location in Turkey Akçaköy (Marmara)
- Coordinates: 39.683°N 28.213°E
- Country: Turkey
- Province: Balıkesir
- District: Kepsut
- Population (2022): 355
- Time zone: UTC+3 (TRT)

Akçaköy is a neighbourhood in the municipality and district of Kepsut, Balıkesir Province in Turkey. Its population is 355 (2022).
