= Dereköy, Balya =

Village in Turkey

Dereköy
- Neighbourhood
- Location in Turkey Dereköy (Marmara)
- Coordinates: 39.864°N 27.505°E
- Country: Turkey
- Province: Balıkesir
- District: Balya
- Population (2022): 582
- Time zone: UTC+3 (TRT)

Dereköy is a neighbourhood in the municipality and district of Balya of Balıkesir Province in Turkey. Its population is 582 (2022).
