= Demirciler, Dursunbey =

Village in Turkey

Demirciler
- Neighbourhood
- Location in Turkey Demirciler (Marmara)
- Coordinates: 39°29′30″N 28°53′25″E
- Country: Turkey
- Province: Balıkesir
- District: Dursunbey
- Population (2022): 130
- Time zone: UTC+3 (TRT)

Demirciler is a neighbourhood in the municipality and district of Dursunbey, Balıkesir Province in Turkey. Its population is 130 (2022).
