= Kadıköy, Balya =

Village in Turkey

Kadıköy
- Neighbourhood
- Location in Turkey Kadıköy (Marmara)
- Coordinates: 39.782°N 27.607°E
- Country: Turkey
- Province: Balıkesir
- District: Balya
- Population (2022): 164
- Time zone: UTC+3 (TRT)

Kadıköy is a neighbourhood in the municipality and district of Balya of Balıkesir Province in Turkey. Its population is 164 (2022).
