= Değirmendere, Balya =

Village in Turkey

Değirmendere
- Neighbourhood
- Location in Turkey Değirmendere (Marmara)
- Coordinates: 39.905°N 27.575°E
- Country: Turkey
- Province: Balıkesir
- District: Balya
- Population (2022): 204
- Time zone: UTC+3 (TRT)

Değirmendere is a neighbourhood in the municipality and district of Balya of Balıkesir Province in Turkey. Its population is 204 (2022).
