= Karamanlar, Dursunbey =

Village in Turkey

Karamanlar
- Neighbourhood
- Location in Turkey Karamanlar (Marmara)
- Coordinates: 39.525°N 28.453°E
- Country: Turkey
- Province: Balıkesir
- District: Dursunbey
- Population (2022): 190
- Time zone: UTC+3 (TRT)

Karamanlar is a neighbourhood in the municipality and district of Dursunbey, Balıkesir Province in Turkey. Its population is 190 (2022).
