= Yukarıyağcılar, Dursunbey =

Village in Turkey

Yukarıyağcılar
- Neighbourhood
- Location within Turkey Location within Marmara
- Coordinates: 39°29′35″N 28°39′53″E
- Country: Turkey
- Province: Balıkesir
- District: Dursunbey
- Population (2022): 59
- Time zone: UTC+3 (TRT)

Yukarıyağcılar

Yukarıyağcılar is a neighbourhood in the municipality and district of Dursunbey, Balıkesir Province in Turkey. Its population is 59 (2022).
