= Müstecap, Balya =

Village in Turkey

Müstecap
- Neighbourhood
- Location in Turkey Müstecap (Marmara)
- Coordinates: 39°44′34″N 27°32′05″E
- Country: Turkey
- Province: Balıkesir
- District: Balya
- Population (2022): 184
- Time zone: UTC+3 (TRT)

Müstecap is a neighbourhood in the municipality and district of Balya of Balıkesir Province in Turkey. Its population is 184 (2022).
