= Eyüpbükü, Kepsut =

Village in Turkey

Eyüpbükü
- Neighbourhood
- Location in Turkey Eyüpbükü (Marmara)
- Coordinates: 39°38′46″N 28°14′10″E
- Country: Turkey
- Province: Balıkesir
- District: Kepsut
- Population (2022): 104
- Time zone: UTC+3 (TRT)

Eyüpbükü is a neighbourhood in the municipality and district of Kepsut, Balıkesir Province in Turkey. Its population is 104 (2022).
