= Gölcük, Dursunbey =

Village in Turkey

Gölcük
- Neighbourhood
- Location in Turkey Gölcük (Marmara)
- Coordinates: 39.646°N 28.458°E
- Country: Turkey
- Province: Balıkesir
- District: Dursunbey
- Population (2022): 59
- Time zone: UTC+3 (TRT)

Gölcük is a neighbourhood in the municipality and district of Dursunbey, Balıkesir Province in Turkey. Its population is 59 (2022).
