= Tafak, Dursunbey =

Village in Turkey

Tafak
- Neighbourhood
- Location in Turkey Tafak (Marmara)
- Coordinates: 39°30′40″N 28°43′48″E
- Country: Turkey
- Province: Balıkesir
- District: Dursunbey
- Population (2022): 252
- Time zone: UTC+3 (TRT)

Tafak is a neighbourhood in the municipality and district of Dursunbey, Balıkesir Province in Turkey. Its population is 252 (2022).
