= Kavakköy, Dursunbey =

Village in Turkey

Kavakköy
- Neighbourhood
- Location in Turkey Kavakköy (Marmara)
- Coordinates: 39.488°N 28.697°E
- Country: Turkey
- Province: Balıkesir
- District: Dursunbey
- Population (2022): 92
- Time zone: UTC+3 (TRT)

Kavakköy is a neighbourhood in the municipality and district of Dursunbey, Balıkesir Province in Turkey. Its population is 92 (2022).
