= Orhanlar, Balya =

Village in Turkey

Orhanlar
- Neighbourhood
- Location in Turkey Orhanlar (Marmara)
- Coordinates: 39.913°N 27.616°E
- Country: Turkey
- Province: Balıkesir
- District: Balya
- Population (2022): 332
- Time zone: UTC+3 (TRT)

Orhanlar is a neighbourhood in the municipality and district of Balya of Balıkesir Province in Turkey. Its population is 332 (2022).
