= Doğancılar, Dursunbey =

Village in Turkey

Doğancılar
- Neighbourhood
- Location in Turkey Doğancılar (Marmara)
- Coordinates: 39.575°N 28.908°E
- Country: Turkey
- Province: Balıkesir
- District: Dursunbey
- Population (2022): 62
- Time zone: UTC+3 (TRT)

Doğancılar is a neighbourhood in the municipality and district of Dursunbey, Balıkesir Province in Turkey. Its population is 62 (2022).
