= Yarışalanı, Balya =

Village in Turkey

Yarışalanı
- Neighbourhood
- Location in Turkey Yarışalanı (Marmara)
- Coordinates: 39°56′05″N 27°47′20″E
- Country: Turkey
- Province: Balıkesir
- District: Balya
- Population (2022): 149
- Time zone: UTC+3 (TRT)

Yarışalanı is a neighbourhood in the municipality and district of Balya of Balıkesir Province in Turkey. Its population is 149 (2022).
