= Hacıhüseyin, Balya =

Village in Turkey

Hacıhüseyin
- Neighbourhood
- Location in Turkey Hacıhüseyin (Marmara)
- Coordinates: 39.693°N 27.652°E
- Country: Turkey
- Province: Balıkesir
- District: Balya
- Population (2022): 504
- Time zone: UTC+3 (TRT)

Hacıhüseyin is a neighbourhood in the municipality and district of Balya of Balıkesir Province in Turkey. Its population is 504 (2022).
