= Kepsut =

- District and municipality
- Map showing Kepsut District in Balıkesir Province

- Location in Turkey Kepsut (Marmara)
- Coordinates: 39°41′20″N 28°9′8″E
- Country: Turkey
- Province: Balıkesir

Government
  - Mayor: İsmail Cankul (AKP)
- Area: 889 km^{2} (343 sq mi)
- Elevation: 83 m (272 ft)
- Population (2022): 21,825
  - Density: 24.6/km^{2} (63.6/sq mi)
- Time zone: UTC+3 (TRT)
- Postal code: 10650
- Area code: 0266
- Website: www.kepsut.bel.tr

Kepsut is a municipality and district of Balıkesir Province, Turkey. Its area is 889 km^{2}, and its population is 21,825 (2022). Its elevation is 83 m (272 ft). The mayor is İsmail Cankul (AKP).

== Composition ==
There are 69 neighbourhoods in Kepsut District:

- Ahmetölen
- Akçakertil
- Akçaköy
- Alagüney
- Armutlu
- Bağtepe
- Bektaşlar
- Beyköy
- Bükdere
- Büyükkatrancı
- Çalkandil
- Camiatik
- Camicedit
- Dalköy
- Danahisar
- Darıçukuru
- Dedekaşı
- Dereli
- Dombaydere
- Durak
- Eşeler
- Eyüpbükü
- Göbel
- Gökköy
- Hotaşlar
- İhsaniye
- İsaalanı
- Işıklar
- Kalburcu
- Karacaağaç
- Karaçaltı
- Karacaören
- Karagöz
- Karahaliller
- Kasapzade
- Kayacıklar
- Kayaeli
- Keçidere
- Kepekler
- Kızıloluk
- Küçükkatrancı
- Mahkeme
- Mahmudiye
- Mehmetler
- Mestanlar
- Mezitler
- Nusret
- Örencik
- Örenharman
- Örenli
- Osmaniye
- Ovacık
- Piyade
- Recepköy
- Saraçköy
- Sarıçayır
- Sarıfakılar
- Sayacık
- Seçdere
- Serçeören
- Şeremetler
- Servetköy
- Tekkeışıklar
- Tilkicik
- Tuzak
- Yaylabaşı
- Yenice
- Yeşildağ
- Yoğunoluk
