= Hamzacık, Dursunbey =

Village in Turkey

Hamzacık
- Neighbourhood
- Location in Turkey Hamzacık (Marmara)
- Coordinates: 39°42′11″N 28°31′29″E
- Country: Turkey
- Province: Balıkesir
- District: Dursunbey
- Population (2022): 403
- Time zone: UTC+3 (TRT)

Hamzacık is a neighbourhood in the municipality and district of Dursunbey, Balıkesir Province in Turkey. Its population is 403 (2022).
