= Çanakçı, Dursunbey =

Village in Turkey

Çanakçı
- Neighbourhood
- Location in Turkey Çanakçı (Marmara)
- Coordinates: 39.378°N 28.787°E
- Country: Turkey
- Province: Balıkesir
- District: Dursunbey
- Population (2022): 364
- Time zone: UTC+3 (TRT)

Çanakçı is a neighbourhood in the municipality and district of Dursunbey, Balıkesir Province in Turkey. Its population is 364 (2022).
