= Mezitler, Kepsut =

Village in Turkey

Mezitler
- Neighbourhood
- Location in Turkey Mezitler (Marmara)
- Coordinates: 39.537°N 28.279°E
- Country: Turkey
- Province: Balıkesir
- District: Kepsut
- Population (2022): 79
- Time zone: UTC+3 (TRT)

Mezitler is a neighbourhood in the municipality and district of Kepsut, Balıkesir Province in Turkey. Its population is 79 (2022).
