= Umurlar, Dursunbey =

Village in Turkey

Umurlar
- Neighbourhood
- Location in Turkey Umurlar (Marmara)
- Coordinates: 39°39′52″N 28°32′12″E
- Country: Turkey
- Province: Balıkesir
- District: Dursunbey
- Population (2022): 133
- Time zone: UTC+3 (TRT)

Umurlar is a neighbourhood in the municipality and district of Dursunbey, Balıkesir Province in Turkey. Its population is 133 (2022).
