= Güğü, Dursunbey =

Village in Turkey

Güğü
- Neighbourhood
- Location in Turkey Güğü (Marmara)
- Coordinates: 39.471°N 28.653°E
- Country: Turkey
- Province: Balıkesir
- District: Dursunbey
- Population (2022): 425
- Time zone: UTC+3 (TRT)

Güğü is a neighbourhood in the municipality and district of Dursunbey, Balıkesir Province in Turkey. Its population is 425 (2022).
