= Delice, Dursunbey =

Village in Turkey

Delice
- Neighbourhood
- Location in Turkey Delice (Marmara)
- Coordinates: 39.687°N 28.662°E
- Country: Turkey
- Province: Balıkesir
- District: Dursunbey
- Population (2022): 721
- Time zone: UTC+3 (TRT)

Delice is a neighbourhood in the municipality and district of Dursunbey, Balıkesir Province in Turkey. Its population is 721 (2022).
