= Akçagüney, Dursunbey =

Village in Turkey

Akçagüney
- Neighbourhood
- Location in Turkey Akçagüney (Marmara)
- Coordinates: 39°33′42″N 28°23′14″E
- Country: Turkey
- Province: Balıkesir
- District: Dursunbey
- Population (2022): 137
- Time zone: UTC+3 (TRT)

Akçagüney is a neighbourhood in the municipality and district of Dursunbey, Balıkesir Province in Turkey. Its population is 137 (2022).
