= Mancılık, Balya =

Village in Turkey

Mancılık
- Neighbourhood
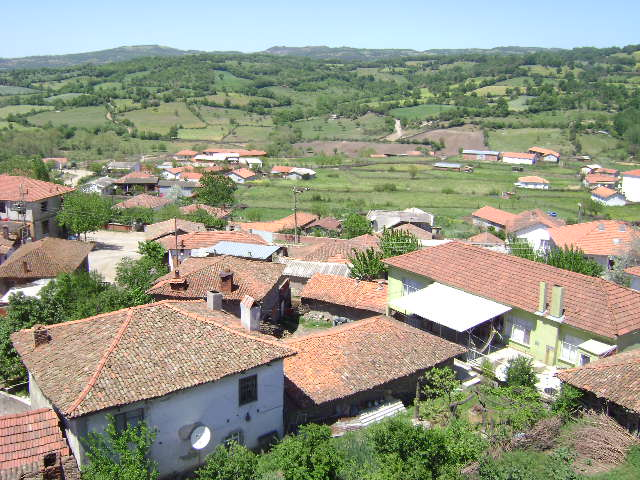

- Location within Turkey Location within Marmara
- Coordinates: 39.886°N 27.529°E
- Country: Turkey
- Province: Balıkesir
- District: Balya
- Population (2022): 340
- Time zone: UTC+3 (TRT)

Mancılık is a neighbourhood in the municipality and district of Balya of Balıkesir Province in Turkey. Its population is 340 (2022).
