= Kesirven, Altıeylül =

Village in Turkey

Kesirven
- Neighbourhood
- Location in Turkey Kesirven (Marmara)
- Coordinates: 39.576°N 27.868°E
- Country: Turkey
- Province: Balıkesir
- District: Altıeylül
- Population (2022): 1,141
- Time zone: UTC+3 (TRT)

Kesirven (formerly: Akçakaya) is a neighbourhood in the municipality and district of Altıeylül of Balıkesir Province in Turkey. Its population is 1,141 (2022).
