= Değirmenciler, Dursunbey =

Village in Turkey

Değirmenciler
- Neighbourhood
- Location in Turkey Değirmenciler (Marmara)
- Coordinates: 39.494°N 28.712°E
- Country: Turkey
- Province: Balıkesir
- District: Dursunbey
- Population (2022): 65
- Time zone: UTC+3 (TRT)

Değirmenciler is a neighbourhood in the municipality and district of Dursunbey, Balıkesir Province in Turkey. Its population is 65 (2022).
