= Karacaağaç, Kepsut =

Village in Turkey

Karacaağaç
- Neighbourhood
- Location in Turkey Karacaağaç (Marmara)
- Coordinates: 39.614°N 28.271°E
- Country: Turkey
- Province: Balıkesir
- District: Kepsut
- Population (2022): 58
- Time zone: UTC+3 (TRT)

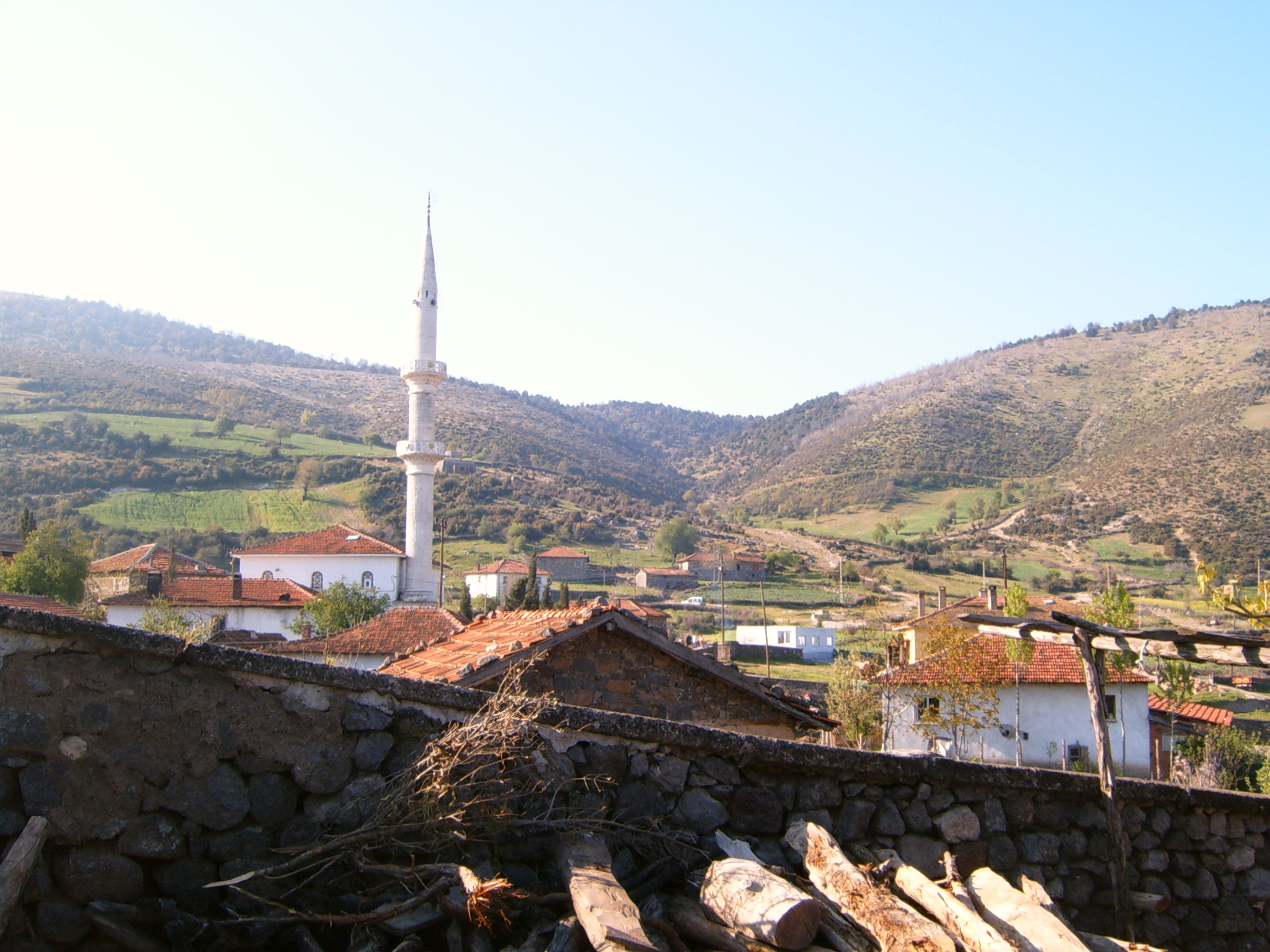
Village of Karaağaç

Karacaağaç is a neighbourhood in the municipality and district of Kepsut, Balıkesir Province in Turkey. Its population is 58 (2022).
