= Yunuslar, Dursunbey =

Village in Turkey

Yunuslar
- Neighbourhood
- Location in Turkey Yunuslar (Marmara)
- Coordinates: 39.522°N 28.912°E
- Country: Turkey
- Province: Balıkesir
- District: Dursunbey
- Population (2022): 72
- Time zone: UTC+3 (TRT)

Yunuslar is a neighbourhood in the municipality and district of Dursunbey, Balıkesir Province in Turkey. Its population is 72 (2022).
