= Şabanlar, Dursunbey =

Village in Turkey

Şabanlar
- Neighbourhood
- Location in Turkey Şabanlar (Marmara)
- Coordinates: 39.650°N 28.491°E
- Country: Turkey
- Province: Balıkesir
- District: Dursunbey
- Population (2022): 473
- Time zone: UTC+3 (TRT)

Şabanlar is a neighbourhood in the municipality and district of Dursunbey, Balıkesir Province in Turkey. Its population is 473 (2022).
