= Hindikler, Dursunbey =

Village in Turkey

Hindikler
- Neighbourhood
- Location in Turkey Hindikler (Marmara)
- Coordinates: 39°30′50″N 28°52′31″E
- Country: Turkey
- Province: Balıkesir
- District: Dursunbey
- Population (2022): 38
- Time zone: UTC+3 (TRT)

Hindikler is a neighbourhood in the municipality and district of Dursunbey, Balıkesir Province in Turkey. As of 2022, its population was 38.
