= Çakallar, Balya =

Village in Turkey

Çakallar
- Neighbourhood
- Location in Turkey Çakallar (Marmara)
- Coordinates: 39.718°N 27.560°E
- Country: Turkey
- Province: Balıkesir
- District: Balya
- Population (2022): 314
- Time zone: UTC+3 (TRT)

Çakallar is a neighbourhood in the municipality and district of Balya of Balıkesir Province in Turkey. Its population is 314 (2022).
