= Naipler, Dursunbey =

Village in Turkey

Naipler
- Neighbourhood
- Location in Turkey Naipler (Marmara)
- Coordinates: 39°35′18″N 28°20′37″E
- Country: Turkey
- Province: Balıkesir
- District: Dursunbey
- Population (2022): 15
- Time zone: UTC+3 (TRT)

Naipler is a neighbourhood in the municipality and district of Dursunbey, Balıkesir Province in Turkey. Its population is 15 (2022).
