= Tepeköy, Dursunbey =

Village in Turkey

Tepeköy
- Neighbourhood
- Location in Turkey Tepeköy (Marmara)
- Coordinates: 39.610°N 28.709°E
- Country: Turkey
- Province: Balıkesir
- District: Dursunbey
- Population (2022): 260
- Time zone: UTC+3 (TRT)

Tepeköy is a neighbourhood in the municipality and district of Dursunbey, Balıkesir Province in Turkey. Its population is 260 (2022).
