= Küçükakçaalan, Dursunbey =

Küçükakçaalan
- Neighbourhood
- Location in Turkey Küçükakçaalan (Marmara)
- Coordinates: 39.6021°N 28.8474°E
- Country: Turkey
- Province: Balıkesir
- District: Dursunbey
- Population (2022): 108
- Time zone: UTC+3 (TRT)

Küçükakçaalan is a neighbourhood in the municipality and district of Dursunbey, Balıkesir Province, Turkey. Its population is 108 (2022).
