= Kızılöz, Dursunbey =

Village in Turkey

Kızılöz
- Neighbourhood
- Location in Turkey Kızılöz (Marmara)
- Coordinates: 39.625°N 28.545°E
- Country: Turkey
- Province: Balıkesir
- District: Dursunbey
- Population (2022): 104
- Time zone: UTC+3 (TRT)

Kızılöz is a neighbourhood in the municipality and district of Dursunbey, Balıkesir Province in Turkey. Its population is 104 (2022).
