= Çamharman, Dursunbey =

Village in Turkey

Çamharman
- Neighbourhood
- Location in Turkey Çamharman (Marmara)
- Coordinates: 39.584°N 28.848°E
- Country: Turkey
- Province: Balıkesir
- District: Dursunbey
- Population (2022): 93
- Time zone: UTC+3 (TRT)

Çamharman is a neighbourhood in the municipality and district of Dursunbey, Balıkesir Province in Turkey. Its population is 93 (2022).
