= Balya =

- District and municipality
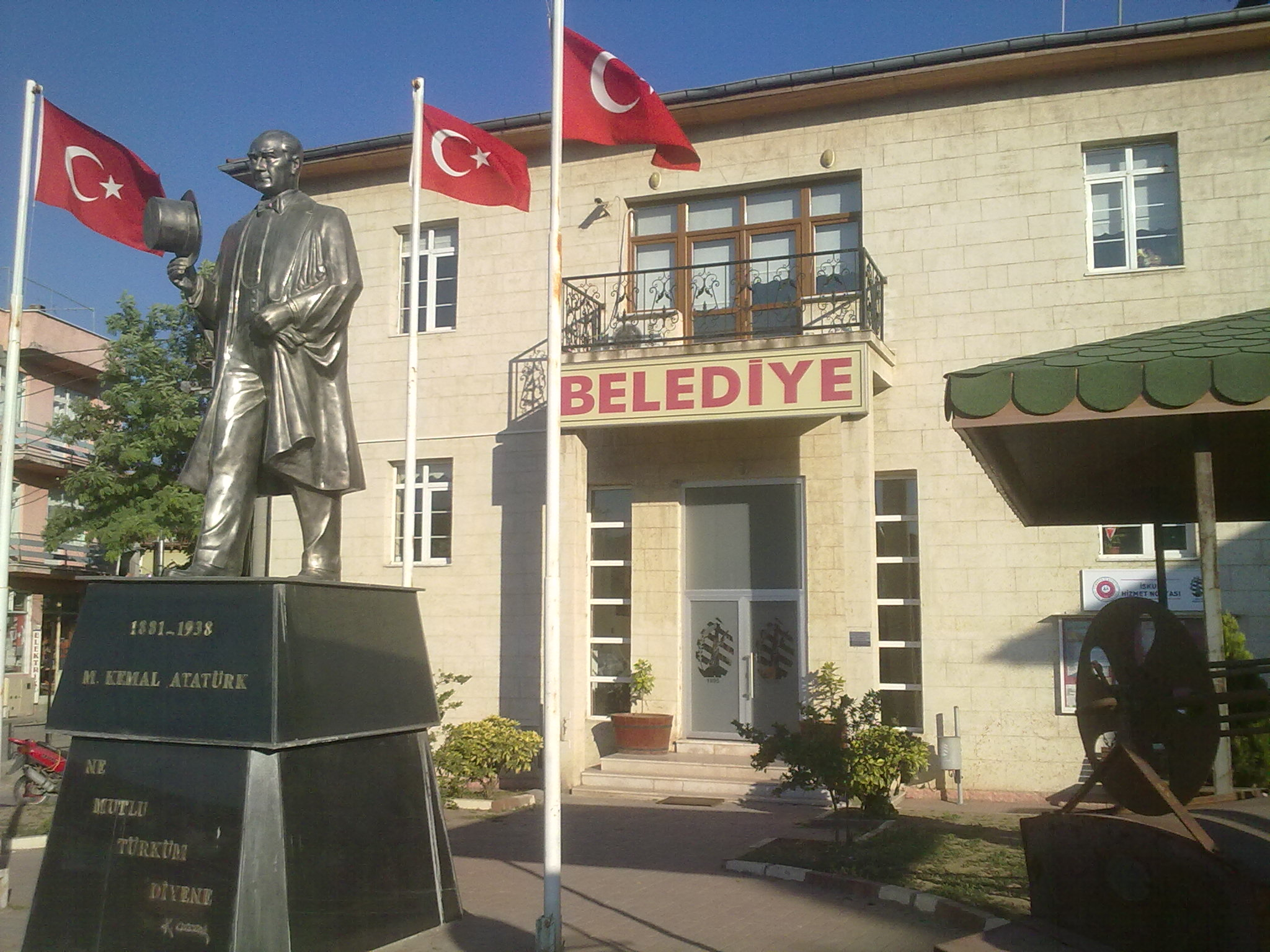

- Map showing Balya District in Balıkesir Province

- Location within Turkey Location within Marmara
- Coordinates: 39°45′N 27°35′E
- Country: Turkey
- Province: Balıkesir

Government
  - Mayor: Orhan Gaga (CHP)
- Area: 797 km^{2} (308 sq mi)
- Elevation: 225 m (738 ft)
- Population (2022): 12,451
  - Density: 15.6/km^{2} (40.5/sq mi)
- Time zone: UTC+3 (TRT)
- Postal code: 10840
- Area code: 0266
- Website: www.balya.bel.tr

Balya is a municipality and district of Balıkesir Province, Turkey. Its area is 797 km^{2}, and its population is 12,451 (2022). The mayor is Orhan Gaga (CHP).

== Composition ==
There are 46 neighbourhoods in Balya District:

- Akbaş
- Alidemirci
- Bengiler
- Çakallar
- Çalova
- Çamavşar
- Çamucu
- Çarmık
- Çiğdem
- Çukurcak
- Danişment
- Değirmendere
- Dereköy
- Doğanlar
- Enverpaşa
- Farsak
- Gökmusa
- Göktepe
- Göloba
- Habipler
- Hacıhüseyin
- Havutbaşı
- Ilıca
- Kadıköy
- Karacahisar
- Karlık
- Kaşıkçı
- Kavakalanı
- Kayalar
- Kayapınar
- Kocabük
- Kocacami
- Koyuneri
- Mancılık
- Medrese
- Müstecap
- Narlı
- Örenköy
- Orhanlar
- Patlak
- Semizköy
- Söbücealan
- Yarışalanı
- Yaylacık
- Yazlık
- Yenikavak
