= Aşağımusalar, Dursunbey =

Village in Turkey

Aşağımusalar
- Neighbourhood
- Location in Turkey Aşağımusalar (Marmara)
- Coordinates: 39.482°N 28.575°E
- Country: Turkey
- Province: Balıkesir
- District: Dursunbey
- Population (2022): 246
- Time zone: UTC+3 (TRT)

Aşağımusalar is a neighbourhood in the municipality and district of Dursunbey, Balıkesir Province in Turkey. Its population is 246 (2022).
