= Kardeşler, Dursunbey =

Village in Turkey

Kardeşler
- Neighbourhood
- Location in Turkey Kardeşler (Marmara)
- Coordinates: 39.573°N 28.951°E
- Country: Turkey
- Province: Balıkesir
- District: Dursunbey
- Population (2022): 129
- Time zone: UTC+3 (TRT)

Kardeşler is a neighbourhood in the municipality and district of Dursunbey, Balıkesir Province in Turkey. Its population is 129 (2022).
