= Hopanlar, Dursunbey =

Village in Turkey

Hopanlar
- Neighbourhood
- Location in Turkey Hopanlar (Marmara)
- Coordinates: 39°36′32″N 28°57′56″E
- Country: Turkey
- Province: Balıkesir
- District: Dursunbey
- Population (2022): 33
- Time zone: UTC+3 (TRT)

Hopanlar is a neighbourhood in the municipality and district of Dursunbey, Balıkesir Province in Turkey. Its population is 33 (2022).
