= Veliler, Dursunbey =

Village in Turkey

Veliler
- Neighbourhood
- Location in Turkey Veliler (Marmara)
- Coordinates: 39.636°N 28.480°E
- Country: Turkey
- Province: Balıkesir
- District: Dursunbey
- Population (2022): 100
- Time zone: UTC+3 (TRT)

Veliler is a neighbourhood in the municipality and district of Dursunbey, Balıkesir Province in Turkey. Its population is 100 (2022).
