= Mıcırlar, Dursunbey =

Village in Turkey

Mıcırlar
- Neighbourhood
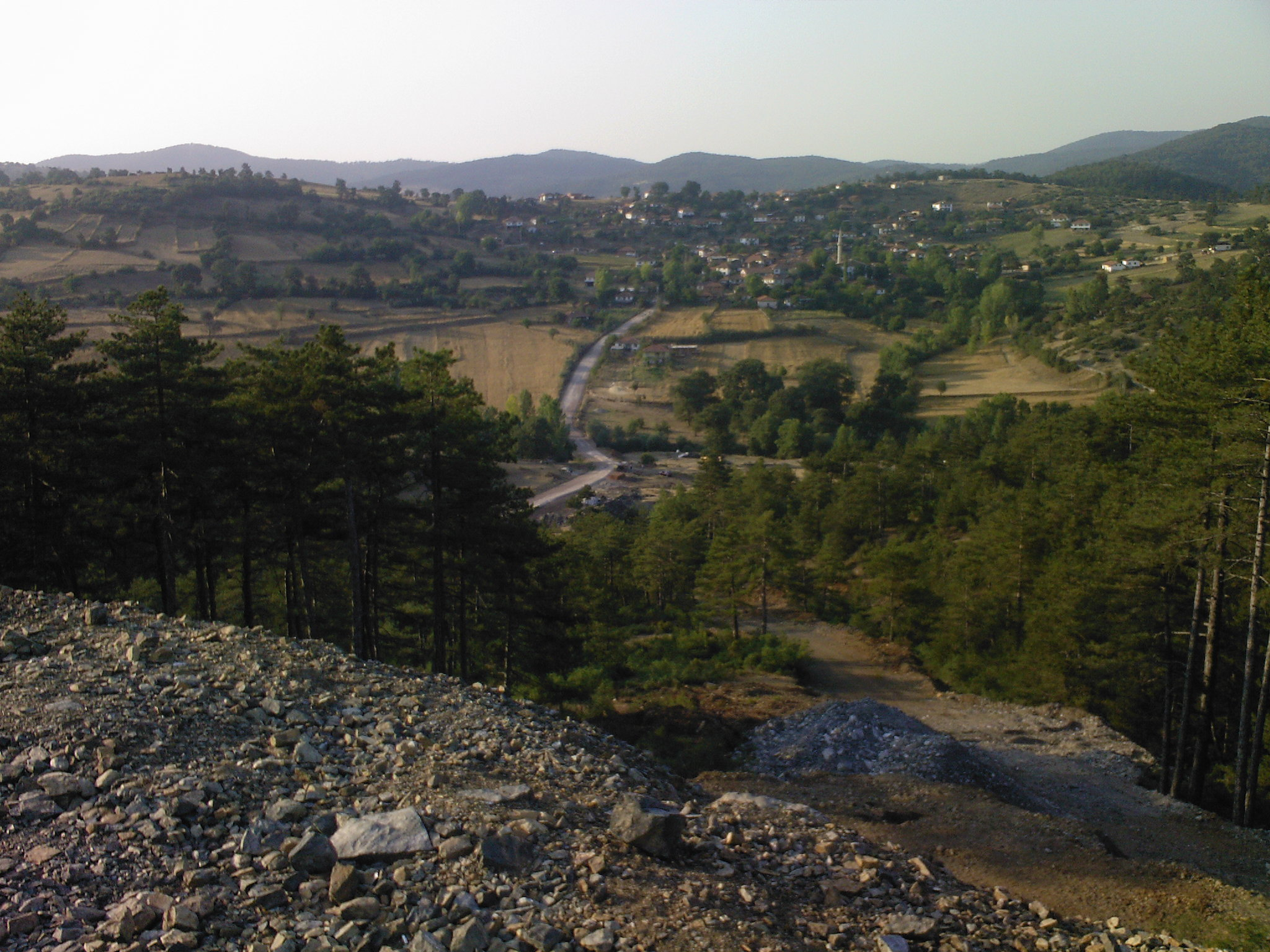

- Location within Turkey Location within Marmara
- Coordinates: 39°42′31″N 28°34′09″E
- Country: Turkey
- Province: Balıkesir
- District: Dursunbey
- Population (2022): 331
- Time zone: UTC+3 (TRT)

Mıcırlar is a neighbourhood in the municipality and district of Dursunbey, Balıkesir Province in Turkey. Its population is 331 (2022).
