= Karagöz, Dursunbey =

Village in Balıkesir, Turkey

Karagöz
- Neighbourhood
- Location in Turkey Karagöz (Marmara)
- Coordinates: 39.504°N 28.845°E
- Country: Turkey
- Province: Balıkesir
- District: Dursunbey
- Population (2022): 135
- Time zone: UTC+3 (TRT)

Karagöz is a neighbourhood in the municipality and district of Dursunbey, Balıkesir Province in Turkey. Its population is 135 (2022).
