= Çelikler, Dursunbey =

Village in Turkey

Çelikler
- Neighbourhood
- Location in Turkey Çelikler (Marmara)
- Coordinates: 39°27′05″N 28°41′06″E
- Country: Turkey
- Province: Balıkesir
- District: Dursunbey
- Population (2022): 46
- Time zone: UTC+3 (TRT)

Çelikler is a neighbourhood in the municipality and district of Dursunbey, Balıkesir Province in Turkey. Its population is 46 (2022).
