= Resüller, Dursunbey =

Village in Turkey

Resüller
- Neighbourhood
- Location in Turkey Resüller (Marmara)
- Coordinates: 39.465°N 28.875°E
- Country: Turkey
- Province: Balıkesir
- District: Dursunbey
- Population (2022): 87
- Time zone: UTC+3 (TRT)

Resüller is a neighbourhood in the municipality and district of Dursunbey, Balıkesir Province in Turkey. Its population is 87 (2022).
