= Örenköy, Dursunbey =

Village in Turkey

Örenköy
- Neighbourhood
- Location in Turkey Örenköy (Marmara)
- Coordinates: 39.608°N 28.943°E
- Country: Turkey
- Province: Balıkesir
- District: Dursunbey
- Population (2022): 39
- Time zone: UTC+3 (TRT)

Örenköy is a neighbourhood in the municipality and district of Dursunbey, Balıkesir Province in Turkey. Its population is 39 (2022).
