= Yazlık, Balya =

Village in Turkey

Yazlık
- Neighbourhood
- Location in Turkey Yazlık (Marmara)
- Coordinates: 39.800°N 27.577°E
- Country: Turkey
- Province: Balıkesir
- District: Balya
- Population (2022): 69
- Time zone: UTC+3 (TRT)

Yazlık is a neighbourhood in the municipality and district of Balya of Balıkesir Province in Turkey. Its population is 69 (2022).
