= Büyükakçaalan, Dursunbey =

Village in Turkey

Büyükakçaalan
- Neighbourhood
- Location in Turkey Büyükakçaalan (Marmara)
- Coordinates: 39.641°N 28.699°E
- Country: Turkey
- Province: Balıkesir
- District: Dursunbey
- Population (2022): 368
- Time zone: UTC+3 (TRT)

Büyükakçaalan is a neighbourhood in the municipality and district of Dursunbey, Balıkesir Province in Turkey. Its population is 368 (2022).
