= Çamköy, Dursunbey =

Village in Turkey

Çamköy
- Neighbourhood
- Location in Turkey Çamköy (Marmara)
- Coordinates: 39.585°N 28.498°E
- Country: Turkey
- Province: Balıkesir
- District: Dursunbey
- Population (2022): 157
- Time zone: UTC+3 (TRT)

Çamköy is a neighbourhood in the municipality and district of Dursunbey, Balıkesir Province in Turkey. Its population is 157 (2022).
