= Dedekaşı, Kepsut =

Village in Turkey

Dedekaşı
- Neighbourhood
- Location in Turkey Dedekaşı (Marmara)
- Coordinates: 39°35′37″N 28°09′28″E
- Country: Turkey
- Province: Balıkesir
- District: Kepsut
- Population (2022): 94
- Time zone: UTC+3 (TRT)

Dedekaşı is a neighbourhood in the municipality and district of Kepsut, Balıkesir Province in Turkey. Its population is 94 (2022).
