= Aslıhantepeciği, Altıeylül =

Village in Turkey

Aslıhantepeciği
- Neighbourhood
- Location in Turkey Aslıhantepeciği (Marmara)
- Coordinates: 39°34′48″N 28°01′28″E
- Country: Turkey
- Province: Balıkesir
- District: Altıeylül
- Population (2022): 997
- Time zone: UTC+3 (TRT)

Aslıhantepeciği (also: Aslıhan Tepeciği) is a neighbourhood in the municipality and district of Altıeylül of Balıkesir Province in Turkey. Its population is 997 (2022).
