= Beyel, Dursunbey =

Village in Turkey

Beyel
- Neighbourhood
- Location in Turkey Beyel (Marmara)
- Coordinates: 39°33′11″N 28°41′24″E
- Country: Turkey
- Province: Balıkesir
- District: Dursunbey
- Population (2022): 260
- Time zone: UTC+3 (TRT)

Beyel is a neighbourhood in the municipality and district of Dursunbey, Balıkesir Province in Turkey. Its population is 260 (2022).
