= Gazellidere, Dursunbey =

Village in Turkey

Gazellidere
- Neighbourhood
- Location in Turkey Gazellidere (Marmara)
- Coordinates: 39°32′40″N 28°27′48″E
- Country: Turkey
- Province: Balıkesir
- District: Dursunbey
- Population (2022): 47
- Time zone: UTC+3 (TRT)

Gazellidere is a neighbourhood in the municipality and district of Dursunbey, Balıkesir Province in Turkey. Its population is 47 (2022).
