= Aziziye, Dursunbey =

Village in Turkey

Aziziye
- Neighbourhood
- Location in Turkey Aziziye (Marmara)
- Coordinates: 39°30′45″N 28°46′12″E
- Country: Turkey
- Province: Balıkesir
- District: Dursunbey
- Population (2022): 132
- Time zone: UTC+3 (TRT)

Aziziye is a neighbourhood in the municipality and district of Dursunbey, Balıkesir Province in Turkey. Its population is 132 (2022).
