= Gürleyen, Dursunbey =

Village in Turkey

Gürleyen
- Neighbourhood
- Location in Turkey Gürleyen (Marmara)
- Coordinates: 39°32′17″N 28°24′44″E
- Country: Turkey
- Province: Balıkesir
- District: Dursunbey
- Population (2022): 24
- Time zone: UTC+3 (TRT)

Gürleyen is a neighbourhood in the municipality and district of Dursunbey, Balıkesir Province in Turkey. Its population is 24 (2022).
