= Koyuneri, Balya =

Village in Turkey

Koyuneri
- Neighbourhood
- Location in Turkey Koyuneri (Marmara)
- Coordinates: 39°55′19″N 27°39′29″E
- Country: Turkey
- Province: Balıkesir
- District: Balya
- Population (2022): 352
- Time zone: UTC+3 (TRT)

Koyuneri is a neighbourhood in the municipality and district of Balya of Balıkesir Province in Turkey. Its population is 352 (2022).
