= Kumlu, Dursunbey =

Village in Turkey

Kumlu
- Neighbourhood
- Location in Turkey Kumlu (Marmara)
- Coordinates: 39.535°N 28.360°E
- Country: Turkey
- Province: Balıkesir
- District: Dursunbey
- Population (2022): 77
- Time zone: UTC+3 (TRT)

Kumlu is a neighbourhood in the municipality and district of Dursunbey, Balıkesir Province in Turkey. Its population is 77 (2022).
