= Karapınar, Dursunbey =

Village in Turkey

Karapınar
- Neighbourhood
- Location in Turkey Karapınar (Marmara)
- Coordinates: 39.607°N 28.472°E
- Country: Turkey
- Province: Balıkesir
- District: Dursunbey
- Population (2022): 66
- Time zone: UTC+3 (TRT)

Karapınar is a neighbourhood in the municipality and district of Dursunbey, Balıkesir Province in Turkey. Its population is 66 (2022).
