= Selimağa, Dursunbey =

Village in Turkey

Selimağa
- Neighbourhood
- Location in Turkey Selimağa (Marmara)
- Coordinates: 39°34′50″N 28°32′25″E
- Country: Turkey
- Province: Balıkesir
- District: Dursunbey
- Population (2022): 787
- Time zone: UTC+3 (TRT)

Selimağa is a neighbourhood in the municipality and district of Dursunbey, Balıkesir Province in Turkey. Its population was 787 (2022).
