= Dursunbey =

- District and municipality
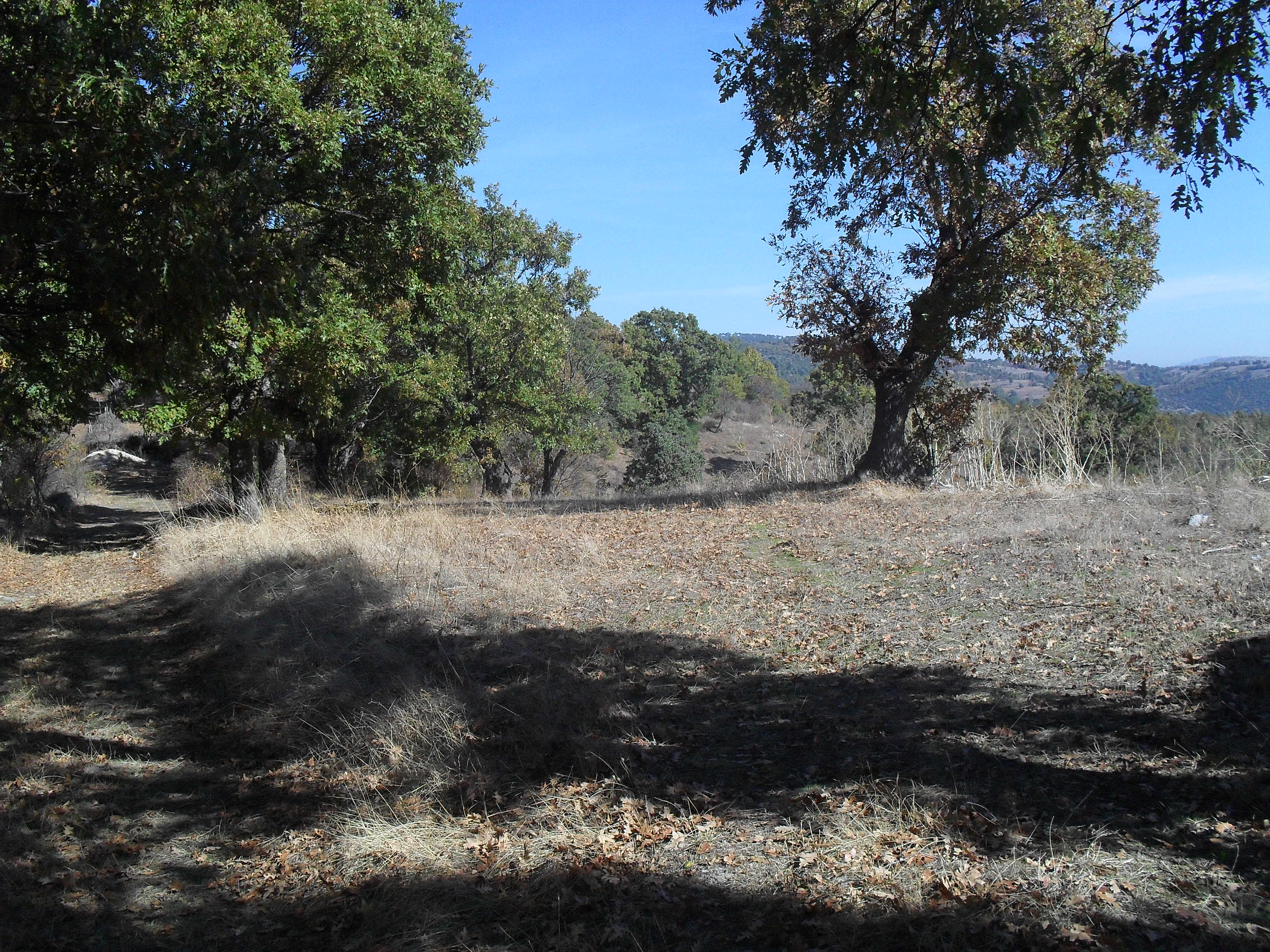
- Hasanlar countryside, Dursunbey

- Logo

- Map showing Dursunbey District in Balıkesir Province

- Location within Turkey Location within Marmara
- Coordinates: 39°35′16″N 28°37′39″E
- Country: Turkey
- Province: Balıkesir

Government
  - Mayor: Ramazan Bahçavan (AKP)
- Area: 1,719 km^{2} (664 sq mi)
- Elevation: 670 m (2,200 ft)
- Population (2022): 33,333
  - Density: 19.39/km^{2} (50.22/sq mi)
- Time zone: UTC+3 (TRT)
- Postal code: 10800
- Area code: 0266
- Website: www.dursunbey.bel.tr

Dursunbey, formerly Balat and Hadriania in antiquity (Ancient greek Αδριανία), is a municipality and district of Balıkesir Province, Turkey. Its area is 1,719 km^{2}, and its population is 33,333 (2022). The mayor is Ramazan Bahçavan (AKP). Dursunbey is noted for its wood and apples.

== Composition ==
There are 111 neighbourhoods in Dursunbey District:

- 3 Eylül
- Adaören
- Akbaşlar
- Akçagüney
- Akyayla
- Alaçam
- Alagüney
- Arıklar
- Aşağımusalar
- Aşağıyağcılar
- Ayvacık
- Aziziye
- Bayıryüzügüney
- Beyce
- Beyel
- Boyalıca
- Bozyokuş
- Büyükakçaalan
- Çakırca
- Çakmak
- Çaltıcak
- Çamharman
- Çamköy
- Çanakçı
- Çatalçam
- Cebeci
- Çelikler
- Çiftçi
- Çınarköy
- Dada
- Değirmenciler
- Delice
- Demirciler
- Dereköy
- Dodurga
- Doğancılar
- Durabeyler
- Ericek
- Ferah
- Gazellidere
- Göbül
- Gökçedağ
- Gökçepınar
- Gölcük
- Güğü
- Gürleyen
- Hacıahmetpınarı
- Hacılar
- Hamzacık
- Hasanlar
- Hindikler
- Hondular
- Hopanlar
- İrfaniye
- Işıklar
- İsmailler
- İstasyon
- Karagöz
- Karakaya
- Karamanlar
- Karapınar
- Kardeşler
- Karyağmaz
- Kavacık
- Kavakköy
- Kazimiye
- Kireç
- Kızılcadere
- Kızılöz
- Küçükakçaalan
- Küçükler
- Kumlu
- Kurtlar
- Kuzköy
- Mahmudiye
- Mahmutça
- Meydançayırı
- Mıcırlar
- Mollaoğlu
- Naipler
- Odaköy
- Örenköy
- Osmaniye
- Poyracık
- Ramazanlar
- Reşadiye
- Resüller
- Şabanlar
- Saçayak
- Sağırlar
- Sakızköy
- Sarısipahiler
- Sarnıçköy
- Sebiller
- Selimağa
- Şenköy
- Sinderler
- Süleler
- Tafak
- Taşkesiği
- Taşpınar
- Tepeköy
- Tezlik
- Turnacık
- Umurlar
- Vakıf
- Veliler
- Yassıören
- Yukarımusalar
- Yukarıyağcılar
- Yunuslar

== Climate ==
Dursunbey has a hot-summer Mediterranean climate (Köppen: Csa), with hot, dry summers, and chilly, moderately snowy winters.

Climate data for Dursunbey (1991–2020)
Month	Jan	Feb	Mar	Apr	May	Jun	Jul	Aug	Sep	Oct	Nov	Dec	Year
Mean daily maximum °C (°F)	7.4 (45.3)	9.2 (48.6)	12.8 (55.0)	17.4 (63.3)	22.7 (72.9)	27.2 (81.0)	30.3 (86.5)	30.8 (87.4)	26.5 (79.7)	20.9 (69.6)	14.6 (58.3)	9.0 (48.2)	19.1 (66.4)
Daily mean °C (°F)	2.7 (36.9)	3.9 (39.0)	6.6 (43.9)	10.9 (51.6)	15.8 (60.4)	19.9 (67.8)	22.5 (72.5)	22.5 (72.5)	18.6 (65.5)	13.9 (57.0)	8.5 (47.3)	4.4 (39.9)	12.6 (54.7)
Mean daily minimum °C (°F)	−0.7 (30.7)	0.0 (32.0)	2.0 (35.6)	5.5 (41.9)	9.8 (49.6)	13.4 (56.1)	15.6 (60.1)	15.7 (60.3)	12.3 (54.1)	8.8 (47.8)	4.2 (39.6)	1.1 (34.0)	7.3 (45.1)
Average precipitation mm (inches)	73.04 (2.88)	63.03 (2.48)	57.3 (2.26)	58.95 (2.32)	45.71 (1.80)	37.08 (1.46)	10.53 (0.41)	11.05 (0.44)	25.94 (1.02)	48.27 (1.90)	58.4 (2.30)	70.69 (2.78)	559.99 (22.05)
Average precipitation days (≥ 1.0 mm)	8.9	8.1	8.0	7.1	6.7	4.7	1.8	2.1	3.7	5.8	6.7	9.3	72.9
Average relative humidity (%)	75.9	72.7	68.6	65.2	64.3	61.5	58.4	59.8	62.1	69.2	72.2	76.3	67.2
Source: NOAA
