= Sinderler, Dursunbey =

Village in Turkey

Sinderler
- Neighbourhood
- Location in Turkey Sinderler (Marmara)
- Coordinates: 39°35′35″N 28°45′03″E
- Country: Turkey
- Province: Balıkesir
- District: Dursunbey
- Population (2022): 119
- Time zone: UTC+3 (TRT)

Sinderler is a neighbourhood in the municipality and district of Dursunbey, Balıkesir Province in Turkey. Its population is 119 (2022).
