= İsmailler, Dursunbey =

Village in Turkey

İsmailler
- Neighbourhood
- Location in Turkey İsmailler (Marmara)
- Coordinates: 39.504°N 28.615°E
- Country: Turkey
- Province: Balıkesir
- District: Dursunbey
- Population (2022): 174
- Time zone: UTC+3 (TRT)

İsmailler is a neighbourhood in the municipality and district of Dursunbey, Balıkesir Province in Turkey. Its population is 174 (2022).
