= Meydançayırı, Dursunbey =

Village in Turkey

Meydançayırı
- Neighbourhood
- Location in Turkey Meydançayırı (Marmara)
- Coordinates: 39.679°N 28.451°E
- Country: Turkey
- Province: Balıkesir
- District: Dursunbey
- Population (2022): 40
- Time zone: UTC+3 (TRT)

Meydançayırı is a neighbourhood in the municipality and district of Dursunbey, Balıkesir Province in Turkey. Its population is 40 (2022).
