= Hondular, Dursunbey =

Village in Turkey

Hondular
- Neighbourhood
- Location in Turkey Hondular (Marmara)
- Coordinates: 39°33′21″N 28°45′45″E
- Country: Turkey
- Province: Balıkesir
- District: Dursunbey
- Population (2022): 198
- Time zone: UTC+3 (TRT)

Hondular is a neighbourhood in the municipality and district of Dursunbey, Balıkesir Province in Turkey. Its population is 198 (2022).
