= Gökçepınar, Dursunbey =

Village in Turkey

Gökçepınar
- Neighbourhood
- Location in Turkey Gökçepınar (Marmara)
- Coordinates: 39.472°N 28.712°E
- Country: Turkey
- Province: Balıkesir
- District: Dursunbey
- Population (2022): 53
- Time zone: UTC+3 (TRT)

Gökçepınar is a neighbourhood in the municipality and district of Dursunbey, Balıkesir Province in Turkey. Its population is 53 (2022).
