= Sarısipahiler, Dursunbey =

Village in Turkey

Sarısipahiler
- Neighbourhood
- Location in Turkey Sarısipahiler (Marmara)
- Coordinates: 39°31′24″N 28°50′41″E
- Country: Turkey
- Province: Balıkesir
- District: Dursunbey
- Population (2022): 84
- Time zone: UTC+3 (TRT)

Sarısipahiler is a neighbourhood in the municipality and district of Dursunbey, Balıkesir Province in Turkey. Its population is 84 (2022).
