= Adaören, Dursunbey =

Village in Turkey

Adaören
- Neighbourhood
- Location in Turkey Adaören (Marmara)
- Coordinates: 39.647°N 28.752°E
- Country: Turkey
- Province: Balıkesir
- District: Dursunbey
- Population (2022): 278
- Time zone: UTC+3 (TRT)

Adaören is a neighbourhood in the municipality and district of Dursunbey, Balıkesir Province in Turkey. Its population is 278 (2022).
