= Sebiller, Dursunbey =

Village in Turkey

Sebiller
- Neighbourhood
- Location in Turkey Sebiller (Marmara)
- Coordinates: 39.526°N 28.387°E
- Country: Turkey
- Province: Balıkesir
- District: Dursunbey
- Population (2022): 27
- Time zone: UTC+3 (TRT)

Sebiller is a neighbourhood in the municipality and district of Dursunbey, Balıkesir Province in Turkey. Its population is 27 (2022).
