= Alagüney, Dursunbey =

Village in Turkey

Alagüney
- Neighbourhood
- Location in Turkey Alagüney (Marmara)
- Coordinates: 39.537°N 28.898°E
- Country: Turkey
- Province: Balıkesir
- District: Dursunbey
- Population (2022): 45
- Time zone: UTC+3 (TRT)

Alagüney is a neighbourhood in the municipality and district of Dursunbey, Balıkesir Province in Turkey. Its population is 45 (2022).
