= Altıeylül =

District and municipality in Balıkesir, Turkey

- District and municipality
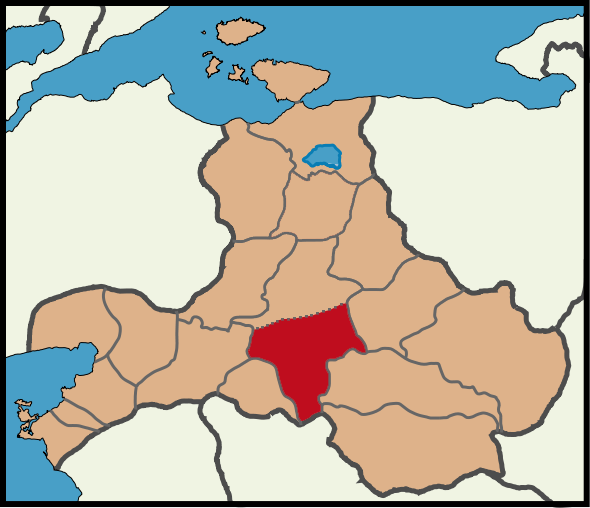
- Map showing Altıeylül District in Balıkesir Province

- Location in Turkey Altıeylül (Marmara)
- Coordinates: 39.6453°N 27.8833°E
- Country: Turkey
- Province: Balıkesir

Government
  - Mayor: Hakan Şehirli (CHP)
- Area: 956 km^{2} (369 sq mi)
- Elevation: 117 m (384 ft)
- Population (2022): 183,736
  - Density: 190/km^{2} (500/sq mi)
- Time zone: UTC+3 (TRT)
- Area code: 0266
- Website: www.altieylul.bel.tr

Altıeylül is a municipality and district of Balıkesir Province, Turkey. Its area is 956 km^{2}, and its population is 183,736 (2022).

The district was established in 2012, when Balıkesir Province was declared a metropolitan municipality as a part of the 2013 Turkish local government reorganisation (Law no. 6360). Altıeylül was created out of the former Balıkesir central district, along with Karesi. The name Altıeylül means "6 September", which was the date of recovery of Balıkesir during the Turkish War of Independence in 1922.

== Composition ==
There are 94 neighbourhoods in Altıeylül District:

- 1.Gündoğan
- 2.Gündoğan
- Akarsu
- Akçaköy
- Aliağa
- Altıeylül
- Aslıhan
- Aslıhantepeciği
- Ataköy
- Atköy
- Aynaoğlu
- Ayşebacı
- Ayvacık
- Ayvatlar
- Bağalan
- Bahçedere
- Bahçelievler
- Balıklı
- Bayat
- Bereketli
- Beşpınar
- Boğatepe
- Bozen
- Büyükbostancı
- Çakıllık
- Çamköy
- Çandır
- Çayırhisar
- Çiftçidere
- Çiftlikköy
- Çınarlıdere
- Çinge
- Çukurhüseyin
- Dallımandıra
- Dedeburnu
- Dereçiftlik
- Dereköy
- Dinkçiler
- Dişbudak
- Ertuğrul
- Gaziosmanpaşa
- Gökçeören
- Gökköy
- Gümüşçeşme
- Hacıilbey
- Halalca
- Hasan Basri Çantay
- İnkaya
- Kabaklı
- Karabeyler
- Karakavak
- Karakaya
- Karaman
- Karamanlar
- Kasaplar
- Kesirven
- Kılcılar
- Kirazköy
- Kirazpınar
- Konakpınar
- Köseler
- Köylü Köyü
- Kozderegüvem
- Kozören
- Küçükbostancı
- Küpeler
- Kürse
- Kuşkaya
- Kutludüğün
- Kuyualan
- Macarlar
- Meryemdere
- Nergiz
- Orhanlı
- Ortamandıra
- Ovabayındır
- Ovaköy
- Pamukçu
- Paşaköy
- Pilevne
- Sarıalan
- Selimiye
- Sıvatpınar
- Sütlüce
- Taşköy
- Taşpınar
- Tayyipler
- Türkali
- Turnalar
- Yakupköy
- Yenice
- Yeşiller
- Yeşilyurt
- Yıldız
