= Yenikavak, Balya =

Village in Turkey

Yenikavak
- Neighbourhood
- Location in Turkey Yenikavak (Marmara)
- Coordinates: 39.908°N 27.809°E
- Country: Turkey
- Province: Balıkesir
- District: Balya
- Population (2022): 489
- Time zone: UTC+3 (TRT)

Yenikavak is a neighbourhood in the municipality and district of Balya of Balıkesir Province in Turkey. Its population is 489 (2022).
