= Karacahisar, Balya =

Village in Turkey

Karacahisar
- Neighbourhood
- Location in Turkey Karacahisar (Marmara)
- Coordinates: 39.91°N 27.74°E
- Country: Turkey
- Province: Balıkesir
- District: Balya
- Population (2022): 152
- Time zone: UTC+3 (TRT)

Karacahisar is a neighbourhood in the municipality and district of Balya of the Balıkesir Province in Turkey. Its population is 152 (2022).
