= Akarsu, Altıeylül =

Village in Turkey

Akarsu
- Neighbourhood
- Location in Turkey Akarsu (Marmara)
- Coordinates: 39.685°N 28.034°E
- Country: Turkey
- Province: Balıkesir
- District: Altıeylül
- Population (2022): 410
- Time zone: UTC+3 (TRT)

Akarsu is a neighbourhood in the municipality and district of Altıeylül of Balıkesir Province in Turkey. Its population is 410 (2022).
