= Beyce, Dursunbey =

Village in Turkey

Beyce
- Neighbourhood
- Location in Turkey Beyce (Marmara)
- Coordinates: 39.643°N 28.411°E
- Country: Turkey
- Province: Balıkesir
- District: Dursunbey
- Population (2022): 102
- Time zone: UTC+3 (TRT)

Beyce is a neighbourhood in the municipality and district of Dursunbey, Balıkesir Province in Turkey. Its population is 102 (2022).
