= Macarlar, Altıeylül =

Macarlar
- Neighbourhood
- Location in Turkey Macarlar (Marmara)
- Coordinates: 39°31′41″N 27°49′19″E
- Country: Turkey
- Province: Balıkesir
- District: Altıeylül
- Population (2022): 1,385
- Time zone: UTC+3 (TRT)

Macarlar is a neighbourhood of the municipality and district of Altıeylül, Balıkesir Province, Turkey. Its population is 1,385 (2022). The village is under the impact of Mediterranean climate.
