= Dereçiftlik, Altıeylül =

Village in Turkey

Dereçiftlik
- Neighbourhood
- Location in Turkey Dereçiftlik (Marmara)
- Coordinates: 39.563°N 27.804°E
- Country: Turkey
- Province: Balıkesir
- District: Altıeylül
- Population (2022): 377
- Time zone: UTC+3 (TRT)

Dereçiftlik is a neighbourhood in the municipality and district of Altıeylül of Balıkesir Province in Turkey. Its population is 377 (2022).
