= Alaçam, Dursunbey =

Village in Turkey

Alaçam
- Neighbourhood
- Location in Turkey Alaçam (Marmara)
- Coordinates: 39.414°N 28.666°E
- Country: Turkey
- Province: Balıkesir
- District: Dursunbey
- Population (2022): 110
- Time zone: UTC+3 (TRT)

Alaçam is a neighbourhood in the municipality and district of Dursunbey, Balıkesir Province in Turkey. Its population is 110 (2022).
