= Çukurcak, Balya =

Village in Turkey

Çukurcak
- Neighbourhood
- Location in Turkey Çukurcak (Marmara)
- Coordinates: 39.811°N 27.587°E
- Country: Turkey
- Province: Balıkesir
- District: Balya
- Population (2022): 88
- Time zone: UTC+3 (TRT)

Çukurcak is a neighbourhood in the municipality and district of Balya of Balıkesir Province in Turkey. Its population is 88 (2022).
