= Taşköy, Altıeylül =

Village in Turkey

Taşköy
- Neighbourhood
- Location in Turkey Taşköy (Marmara)
- Coordinates: 39.472°N 27.885°E
- Country: Turkey
- Province: Balıkesir
- District: Altıeylül
- Population (2022): 208
- Time zone: UTC+3 (TRT)

Taşköy is a neighbourhood in the municipality and district of Altıeylül of Balıkesir Province in Turkey. Its population is 208 (2022).
