= Kazimiye, Dursunbey =

Village in Turkey

Kazimiye
- Neighbourhood
- Location in Turkey Kazimiye (Marmara)
- Coordinates: 39°35′51″N 28°49′42″E
- Country: Turkey
- Province: Balıkesir
- District: Dursunbey
- Population (2022): 60
- Time zone: UTC+3 (TRT)

Kazimiye is a neighbourhood in the municipality and district of Dursunbey, Balıkesir Province in Turkey. Its population is 60 (2022).
