= Süleler, Dursunbey =

Village in Turkey

Süleler
- Neighbourhood
- Location in Turkey Süleler (Marmara)
- Coordinates: 39°41′33″N 28°29′18″E
- Country: Turkey
- Province: Balıkesir
- District: Dursunbey
- Population (2022): 314
- Time zone: UTC+3 (TRT)

Süleler is a neighbourhood in the municipality and district of Dursunbey, Balıkesir Province in Turkey. Its population is 314 (2022).
