= Dodurga, Dursunbey =

Village in Turkey

Dodurga
- Neighbourhood
- Location in Turkey Dodurga (Marmara)
- Coordinates: 39.581°N 28.698°E
- Country: Turkey
- Province: Balıkesir
- District: Dursunbey
- Population (2022): 372
- Time zone: UTC+3 (TRT)

Dodurga (before 2022: Hacıömerler) is a neighbourhood in the municipality and district of Dursunbey, Balıkesir Province in Turkey. Its population is 372 (2022).
