= Odaköy, Dursunbey =

Village in Turkey

Odaköy
- Neighbourhood
- Location in Turkey Odaköy (Marmara)
- Coordinates: 39.727°N 28.570°E
- Country: Turkey
- Province: Balıkesir
- District: Dursunbey
- Population (2022): 238
- Time zone: UTC+3 (TRT)

Odaköy is a neighbourhood in the municipality and district of Dursunbey, Balıkesir Province in Turkey. Its population is 238 (2022).
