= Habipler, Balya =

Village in Turkey

Habipler
- Neighbourhood
- Location in Turkey Habipler (Marmara)
- Coordinates: 39.697°N 27.488°E
- Country: Turkey
- Province: Balıkesir
- District: Balya
- Population (2022): 235
- Time zone: UTC+3 (TRT)

Habipler is a neighbourhood in the municipality and district of Balya of Balıkesir Province in Turkey. Its population is 235 (2022).
