= Göloba, Balya =

Village in Turkey

Göloba
- Neighbourhood
- Location in Turkey Göloba (Marmara)
- Coordinates: 39.853°N 27.575°E
- Country: Turkey
- Province: Balıkesir
- District: Balya
- Population (2022): 146
- Time zone: UTC+3 (TRT)

Göloba is a neighbourhood in the municipality and district of Balya of Balıkesir Province in Turkey. Its population is 146 (2022).
