= Kayalıdere =

Kayalıdere may refer to:

- Kayalıdere, Bigadiç, a village in Balıkesir province, Turkey
- Kayalıdere, Göynük, a village in Bolu province, Turkey
- Kayalıdere, Susurluk, a village in Balıkesir province, Turkey
