= Dedeler =

Dedeler (Turkish: "saints" or "grandfathers") may refer to the following places in Turkey:

- Dedeler, Çanakkale
- Dedeler, Çubuk, a village in the district of Çubuk, Ankara Province
- Dedeler, Göynük, a village in the district of Göynük, Bolu Province
- Dedeler, Gülnar, a village in the district of Gülnar, Mersin Province
- Dedeler, Karacasu, a village in the district of Karacasu, Aydın Province
- Dedeler, Mudurnu, a village in the district of Mudurnu, Bolu Province
- Dedeler, Seben
- Dedeler, Sındırgı, a village
- Dedeler, Tarsus, a village in the district of Tarsus, Mersin Province
