= Meyvalı =

Meyvalı or Meyvəli may refer to:

- Meyvalı, Fındıklı
- Meyvalı, Bigadiç
- Meyvəli
