= Babaköy =

Babaköy can refer to the following villages in Turkey:

- Babaköy, Bigadiç
- Babaköy, Susurluk
