= Susuz (disambiguation) =

Susuz can refer to the following places in Turkey:

- Susuz, a town in Kars Province
- Susuz, Afyonkarahisar, a town in Afyonkarahisar Province
- Susuz, Araç, a village in Kastamonu Province
- Susuz, Atkaracalar, a village in Çankırı Province
- Susuz, Bucak, a village in Burdur Province
- Susuz, Çubuk, a neighbourhood in Ankara Province
- Susuz, Göynük, a village in Bolu Province
- Susuz, Kahta, a village in Adıyaman Province
- Susuz, Sandıklı, a village in Afyonkarahisar Province
- Susuz, Şavşat, a village in Artvin Province
- Susuz, Seben, a village in Bolu Province
- Susuz, Şenkaya, a neighbourhood in Erzurum Province
- Susuz, Silvan, a neighbourhood in Diyarbakır Province
- Susuz, Vezirköprü, a village in Samsun Province
