= Kargin =

Kargin or Kargın may refer to:

== People ==
- Cem Kargın (born 1978), Turkish footballer
- Valentin Kargin (1907–1969), Russian and Soviet chemist
- Valery Kargin or Valērijs Kargins (born 1961), Latvian economist and banker

== Places ==
=== Iran ===
- Kargin, Hormozgan, a village in Jask County
- Kargin, Kerman, a village in Baft County

=== Turkey ===
- Kargın, Alaca, a village in Çorum Province
- Kargın, Bigadiç, a neighbourhood in Balıkesir Province
- Kargın, Çubuk, a neighbourhood in Ankara Province
- Kargın, Kalecik, a neighbourhood in Ankara Province
- Kargın, Korkuteli, a neighbourhood in Antalya Province
- Kargın, Sandıklı, a village in Afyonkarahisar Province
- Kargın, Tercan, a municipality in Erzincan Province
