= Gökçedere =

Gökçedere (literally "celestial creek" or "blue creek" in Turkish) may refer to the following places in Turkey:

- Gökçedere, Çubuk, a village in the district of Çubuk, Ankara Province
- Gökçedere, Demirözü, a town in the district of Demirözü, Bayburt Province
- Gökçedere, Oltu
- Gökçedere, Susurluk, a village
- Another name for Gökçeören, Balıkesir, a village in the central (Balıkesir) district of Balıkesir Province
