= Kızılöz =

Kızılöz may refer to the following villages in Turkey:

- Kızılöz, Çubuk
- Kızılöz, Dursunbey
- Kızılöz, Osmaneli
- Kızılöz, Samsat
