= Camili =

Camili may refer to the following places in Turkey:

- Camili, Ağaçören, a village in the district of Ağaçören, Aksaray Province
- Camili, Borçka, a village in the district of Borçka, Artvin Province
- Camili, Döşemealtı, a village in the district of Antalya, Antalya Province
- Camili, Emirdağ, a village in the district of Emirdağ, Afyonkarahisar Province
- Camili, Mersin, a village in the district of Akdeniz, Mersin Province
- Camili, Yüreğir, a village in the district of Yüreğir, Adana Province
- Camili, Çubuk, a village in the district of Çubuk, Ankara Province
- Camili, İmamoğlu, a village in the district of İmamoğlu, Adana Province
