= Çatköy =

Çatköy may refer to the following settlements in Turkey:

- Çatköy, Çubuk, a neighbourhood in the municipality and district of Çubuk, Ankara Province
- Çatköy, Hanak, a village in Ardahan Province
- Çatköy, Mazgirt, a village in Tunceli Province
- Çatköy, Ovacık, a village in Tunceli Province
- Çatköy, Pervari, a village in Siirt Province
- Çatköy, Refahiye, a village in Erzincan Province
