= İğciler =

İğciler may refer to the following villages in Turkey:

- İğciler, Bigadiç
- İğciler, Polatlı
