= Kışlacık =

Kışlacık can refer to:

- Kışlacık, Çubuk
- Kışlacık, Kemaliye
- Kışlacık, Mecitözü
