= Gökçeağaç =

Gökçeağaç can refer to:

- Gökçeağaç, Susurluk
- Gökçeağaç, Uğurludağ
- Gökçeağaç, Yığılca
