= Aksaklar =

Aksaklar can refer to:

- Aksaklar, Göynük
- Aksaklar, Yığılca
