= Kızılçukur =

Kızılçukur can refer to the following villages in Turkey:

- Kızılçukur, Bigadiç
- Kızılçukur, Dikili
- Kızılçukur, Tarsus
