= Çeribaşı =

Çeribaşı can refer to:

- Çeribaşı, Bigadiç
- Çeribaşı, Enez
