= Davutlar (disambiguation) =

Davutlar can refer to:

- Davutlar
- Davutlar, Bigadiç
- Davutlar, Yapraklı
