= Osmanca =

Osmanca can refer to:

- Osmanca, Bigadiç
- Osmanca, Düzce
