= Ömercik =

Ömercik may refer to:

- Ömercik, Çubuk, Turkey
- Ömercik, Polateli, Turkey
