= Yukarıçamlı =

Yukarıçamlı can refer to the following villages in Turkey:

- Yukarıçamlı, Bigadiç
- Yukarıçamlı, Bolu
- Yukarıçamlı, Oltu
