= Aşağıçamlı =

Aşağıçamlı (literally "lower pines" or "below are pine trees") is a Turkish place name that may refer to the following places in Turkey:

- Aşağıçamlı, Bigadiç, a village
- Aşağıçamlı, Bolu, a village in the district of Bolu, Bolu Province
- Aşağıçamlı, Oltu
- Aşağıçamlı, Ulus, a village in the district of Ulus, Bartın Province
