= Yeşilyazı =

Yeşilyazı can refer to:

- Yeşilyazı, Göynük
- Yeşilyazı, Hınıs
