= İkipınar =

İkipınar can refer to:

- İkipınar, Çubuk
- İkipınar, İskilip
