= Kayıkçı =

Kayıkçı may refer to:

- Kayıkçı, Susurluk, village in the Susurluk district of Balıkesir province in Turkey

== People with the surname ==
- Burcu Kayıkcı (born 1980), Turkish politician
- Fatma Kayıkçı, Turkish murder victim
- Hasret Kayikçi (born 1991), German footballer

== See also ==
- Kayıkçılar
