= Akbayır =

Akbayır can refer to the following villages in Turkey:

- Akbayır, Cide
- Akbayır, Çubuk
- Akbayır, Hınıs
- Akbayır, Olur
- Akbayır, Yavuzeli
