= Arızlar =

Arızlar is a Turkish place name that may refer to the following places in Turkey:

- Arızlar, Göynük, a village in the district of Göynük, Bolu Province
- Arızlar, Sandıklı, a village in the district of Sandıklı, Afyonkarahisar Province
