= Özlüce =

Özlüce can refer to the following places in Turkey:

- Özlüce, Büyükorhan
- Özlüce, Çubuk
- Özlüce, İnegöl
- Özlüce, İspir
- Özlüce, Kale
- Özlüce, Karakoçan
- Özlüce, Tarsus
- Özlüce Dam
