= Kızılca =

Kızılca is a Turkish place name and may refer to the following places in Turkey:

- Kızılca, Bozdoğan, a village in Bozdoğan district of Aydın Province
- Kızılca, Bozyazı, a village in Bozyazı district of Mersin Province
- Kızılca, Çubuk, a village in Çubuk district of Ankara Province
- Kızılca, Elmalı, a village in Elmalı district of Antalya Province
- Kızılca, Gümüşhacıköy, a village in Gümüşhacıköy district of Amasya Province
- Kızılca, Horasan
- Kızılca, Karakoçan
- Kızılca, Kızılcahamam, a village in Kızılcahamam district of Ankara Province
- Kızılca, Kurşunlu
- Kızılca, Sandıklı, a village in Sandıklı district of Afyonkarahisar Province
- Kızılca, Tavas
- Kızılca, Tercan
