= Karaçam =

Karaçam can refer to:

== People ==
- Beyza Karaçam (born 2000), Turkish female handball player

== Places ==
- Karaçam, Çubuk, a village in Turkey
- Karaçam, Devrekani, a village in Turkey
- Karaçam, Savaştepe, a village in Turkey
