= Kiraz =

Kiraz means "cherry" in Turkish and it's a given name and surname. It may refer to:

== Places ==
- Kiraz, Turkey, a district of İzmir Province in Turkey
- Kiraz, Susurluk, a village

== People ==
- Edmond Kiraz (1923–2020), humor cartoonist and illustrator based in France
- Esra Kiraz (born 1992), Turkish women's armwrestler
- Emrah Kiraz (born 1987), Turkish footballer
- Ferhat Kiraz (born 1989), Turkish footballer
- George Kiraz (born 1965), American Syriacist
- Ümmü Kiraz (born 1982), Turkish female long-distance runner
