= Yılmazköy =

Yılmazköy (literally "unyielding village" in Turkish) may refer to:

- The Turkish name of Skylloura, a village in the district of Nicosia, northern Cyprus
- Yılmazköy, Aydın, a village in the district of Aydın, Aydın Province, Turkey
- Yılmazköy, Çubuk, a village in the district of Çubuk, Ankara Province, Turkey
- Yılmazköy, İliç
