= Bozen (disambiguation) =

Bozen may refer to:

- Bolzano, a bi-lingual northern Italian provincial capital city of which Bozen is the official German name
- Bözen, a Swiss municipality
- Bożeń, a village in Poland
- Bozen, Susurluk, a village in Turkey
- Bozen Green, a village in Hertfordshire, England

== See also ==
- Bernard Bolzano
