= Kızılören, Çubuk =

Kızılören
- Neighbourhood
- Location in Turkey Kızılören (Turkey Central Anatolia)
- Coordinates: 40.4495°N 32.9626°E
- Country: Turkey
- Province: Ankara
- District: Çubuk
- Population (2022): 55
- Time zone: UTC+3 (TRT)

Kızılören is a neighbourhood in the municipality and district of Çubuk, Ankara Province, Turkey. Its population is 55 (2022).
