= Tuğla, Çubuk =

Tuğla
- Neighbourhood
- Location in Turkey Tuğla (Turkey Central Anatolia)
- Coordinates: 40°14′N 32°55′E
- Country: Turkey
- Province: Ankara
- District: Çubuk
- Population (2022): 56
- Time zone: UTC+3 (TRT)

Tuğla is a neighbourhood in the municipality and district of Çubuk, Ankara Province, Turkey. Its population is 56 (2022).
