= Aşağıgöcek, Bigadiç =

Village in Turkey

Aşağıgöcek
- Neighbourhood
- Location in Turkey Aşağıgöcek (Marmara)
- Coordinates: 39°24′14″N 28°25′46″E
- Country: Turkey
- Province: Balıkesir
- District: Bigadiç
- Population (2022): 101
- Time zone: UTC+3 (TRT)

Aşağıgöcek is a neighbourhood in the municipality and district of Bigadiç, Balıkesir Province in Turkey. Its population is 101 (2022).
