= Narzanlar, Göynük =

Narzanlar
- Village
- Location within Turkey
- Coordinates: 40°19′N 30°37′E
- Country: Turkey
- Province: Bolu
- District: Göynük
- Population (2021): 127
- Time zone: UTC+3 (TRT)

Narzanlar is a village in the Göynük District, Bolu Province, Turkey. Its population is 127 (2021).
