= Himmetoğlu, Göynük =

Village in Turkey

Himmetoğlu
- Village
- Location within Turkey
- Coordinates: 40.2362°N 30.7831°E
- Country: Turkey
- Province: Bolu
- District: Göynük
- Population (2021): 506
- Time zone: UTC+3 (TRT)

Himmetoğlu is a village in the Göynük District, Bolu Province, Turkey. Its population is 506 (2021).
