= Topalak, Bigadiç =

Village in Turkey

Topalak
- Neighbourhood
- Location in Turkey Topalak (Marmara)
- Coordinates: 39.472°N 28.371°E
- Country: Turkey
- Province: Balıkesir
- District: Bigadiç
- Population (2022): 176
- Time zone: UTC+3 (TRT)

Topalak is a neighbourhood in the municipality and district of Bigadiç, Balıkesir Province in Turkey. Its population is 176 (2022).
