= Gökçesaray, Göynük =

Gökçesaray
- Village
- Location within Turkey
- Coordinates: 40.4433°N 30.6528°E
- Country: Turkey
- Province: Bolu
- District: Göynük
- Population (2021): 239
- Time zone: UTC+3 (TRT)

Gökçesaray is a village in the Göynük District, Bolu Province, Turkey. Its population is 239 (2021).
