= Bayındır, Göynük =

Bayındır
- Village
- Location within Turkey
- Coordinates: 40.2973°N 30.7346°E
- Country: Turkey
- Province: Bolu
- District: Göynük
- Population (2021): 221
- Time zone: UTC+3 (TRT)

Bayındır is a village in the Göynük District, Bolu Province, Turkey. Its population is 221 (2021).
