= Hacımahmut, Göynük =

Hacımahmut
- Village
- Location within Turkey
- Coordinates: 40.4557°N 30.6375°E
- Country: Turkey
- Province: Bolu
- District: Göynük
- Population (2021): 168
- Time zone: UTC+3 (TRT)

Hacımahmut is a village in the Göynük District, Bolu Province, Turkey. Its population is 168 (2021).
