= Çitköy, Çubuk =

Çitköy
- Neighbourhood
- Location in Turkey Çitköy (Turkey Central Anatolia)
- Coordinates: 40.3500°N 33.0333°E
- Country: Turkey
- Province: Ankara
- District: Çubuk
- Population (2022): 67
- Time zone: UTC+3 (TRT)

Çitköy is a neighbourhood in the municipality and district of Çubuk, Ankara Province, Turkey. Its population is 67 (2022).
