= Ümiteli, Susurluk =

Village in Turkey

Ümiteli
- Neighbourhood
- Location in Turkey Ümiteli (Marmara)
- Coordinates: 40°02′31″N 28°09′26″E
- Country: Turkey
- Province: Balıkesir
- District: Susurluk
- Population (2022): 399
- Time zone: UTC+3 (TRT)

Ümiteli is a neighbourhood in the municipality and district of Susurluk, Balıkesir Province in Turkey. Its population is 399 (2022).
