= Kutuören, Çubuk =

Kutuören
- Neighbourhood
- Country: Turkey
- Province: Ankara
- District: Çubuk
- Population (2022): 164
- Time zone: UTC+3 (TRT)

Kutuören is a neighbourhood in the municipality and district of Çubuk, Ankara Province, Turkey. Its population is 164 (2022).
