= Kalafat, Bigadiç =

Village in Turkey

Kalafat
- Neighbourhood
- Location in Turkey Kalafat (Marmara)
- Coordinates: 39°26′27″N 28°24′18″E
- Country: Turkey
- Province: Balıkesir
- District: Bigadiç
- Population (2022): 169
- Time zone: UTC+3 (TRT)

Kalafat is a neighbourhood in the municipality and district of Bigadiç, Balıkesir Province in Turkey. Its population is 169 (2022).
