= Oyumiğde, Çubuk =

Oyumiğde
- Neighbourhood
- Location in Turkey Oyumiğde (Turkey Central Anatolia)
- Coordinates: 40°19′N 33°14′E
- Country: Turkey
- Province: Ankara
- District: Çubuk
- Population (2022): 101
- Time zone: UTC+3 (TRT)

Oyumiğde is a neighbourhood in the municipality and district of Çubuk, Ankara Province, Turkey. Its population is 101 (2022).
