= Beyköy, Susurluk =

Village in Turkey

Beyköy
- Neighbourhood
- Location in Turkey Beyköy (Marmara)
- Coordinates: 40.0641°N 28.1864°E
- Country: Turkey
- Province: Balıkesir
- District: Susurluk
- Population (2022): 236
- Time zone: UTC+3 (TRT)

Beyköy is a neighbourhood in the municipality and district of Susurluk, Balıkesir Province in Turkey. Its population is 236 (2022).
