= Altınlar, Bigadiç =

Village in Turkey

Altınlar
- Neighbourhood
- Location in Turkey Altınlar (Marmara)
- Coordinates: 39°27′54″N 28°24′44″E
- Country: Turkey
- Province: Balıkesir
- District: Bigadiç
- Population (2022): 238
- Time zone: UTC+3 (TRT)

Altınlar is a neighbourhood in the municipality and district of Bigadiç, Balıkesir Province in Turkey. Its population is 238 (2022).
