= Boyacılar, Göynük =

Boyacılar
- Village
- Location within Turkey
- Coordinates: 40.2785°N 30.6535°E
- Country: Turkey
- Province: Bolu
- District: Göynük
- Population (2021): 182
- Time zone: UTC+3 (TRT)

Boyacılar is a village in the Göynük District, Bolu Province, Turkey. Its population is 182 (2021).
