= Panayır, Bigadiç =

Village in Turkey

Panayır
- Neighbourhood
- Location in Turkey Panayır (Marmara)
- Coordinates: 39.356°N 28.478°E
- Country: Turkey
- Province: Balıkesir
- District: Bigadiç
- Population (2022): 85
- Time zone: UTC+3 (TRT)

Panayır is a neighbourhood in the municipality and district of Bigadiç, Balıkesir Province in Turkey. Its population is 85 (2022).
