= Ağılcık, Çubuk =

Ağılcık
- Neighbourhood
- Location in Turkey Ağılcık (Turkey Central Anatolia)
- Coordinates: 40.2256°N 32.9839°E
- Country: Turkey
- Province: Ankara
- District: Çubuk
- Population (2022): 362
- Time zone: UTC+3 (TRT)

Ağılcık is a neighbourhood in the municipality and district of Çubuk, Ankara Province, Turkey. Its population is 362 (2022).
