= Aşağıçavundur, Çubuk =

Aşağıçavundur
- Neighbourhood
- Location in Turkey Aşağıçavundur (Turkey Central Anatolia)
- Coordinates: 40.2629°N 33.0192°E
- Country: Turkey
- Province: Ankara
- District: Çubuk
- Population (2022): 1,489
- Time zone: UTC+3 (TRT)

Aşağıçavundur is a neighbourhood in the municipality and district of Çubuk, Ankara Province, Turkey. Its population is 1,489 (2022).
