= Örencik, Göynük =

Örencik
- Village
- Location within Turkey
- Coordinates: 40.4449°N 30.8384°E
- Country: Turkey
- Province: Bolu
- District: Göynük
- Population (2021): 327
- Time zone: UTC+3 (TRT)

Örencik is a village in the Göynük District, Bolu Province, Turkey. Its population is 327 (2021).
