= Hasanlar, Göynük =

Hasanlar
- Village
- Location within Turkey
- Coordinates: 40.2614°N 30.8843°E
- Country: Turkey
- Province: Bolu
- District: Göynük
- Population (2021): 300
- Time zone: UTC+3 (TRT)

Hasanlar is a village in the Göynük District, Bolu Province, Turkey. Its population is 300 (2021).
