= Dalyasan, Çubuk =

Dalyasan
- Neighbourhood
- Location in Turkey Dalyasan (Turkey Central Anatolia)
- Coordinates: 40°22′N 33°09′E
- Country: Turkey
- Province: Ankara
- District: Çubuk
- Population (2022): 49
- Time zone: UTC+3 (TRT)

Dalyasan is a neighbourhood in the municipality and district of Çubuk, Ankara Province, Turkey. Its population is 49 (2022).
