= Akkuzulu, Çubuk =

Akkuzulu
- Neighbourhood
- Location in Turkey Akkuzulu (Turkey Central Anatolia)
- Coordinates: 40.2095°N 33.1367°E
- Country: Turkey
- Province: Ankara
- District: Çubuk
- Population (2022): 2,903
- Time zone: UTC+3 (TRT)

Akkuzulu is a neighbourhood in the municipality and district of Çubuk, Ankara Province, Turkey. Its population is 2,903 (2022).
