= Taşpınar, Çubuk =

Taşpınar
- Neighbourhood
- Location in Turkey Taşpınar (Turkey Central Anatolia)
- Coordinates: 40.1745°N 33.0643°E
- Country: Turkey
- Province: Ankara
- District: Çubuk
- Population (2022): 429
- Time zone: UTC+3 (TRT)

Taşpınar is a neighbourhood in the municipality and district of Çubuk, Ankara Province, Turkey. Its population is 429 (2022).
