= Saraycık, Çubuk =

Saraycık
- Neighbourhood
- Location in Turkey Saraycık (Turkey Central Anatolia)
- Coordinates: 40.3354°N 32.9839°E
- Country: Turkey
- Province: Ankara
- District: Çubuk
- Population (2022): 41
- Time zone: UTC+3 (TRT)

Saraycık is a neighbourhood in the municipality and district of Çubuk, Ankara Province, Turkey. Its population is 41 (2022).
