= Sarısu, Çubuk =

Sarısu
- Neighbourhood
- Location in Turkey Sarısu (Turkey Central Anatolia)
- Coordinates: 40.4020°N 33.1872°E
- Country: Turkey
- Province: Ankara
- District: Çubuk
- Population (2022): 131
- Time zone: UTC+3 (TRT)

Sarısu is a neighbourhood in the municipality and district of Çubuk, Ankara Province, Turkey. Its population is 131 (2022).
