= Yakuphasan, Çubuk =

Yakuphasan
- Neighbourhood
- Location in Turkey Yakuphasan (Turkey Central Anatolia)
- Coordinates: 40.2300°N 32.8197°E
- Country: Turkey
- Province: Ankara
- District: Çubuk
- Population (2022): 100
- Time zone: UTC+3 (TRT)

Yakuphasan is a neighbourhood in the municipality and district of Çubuk, Ankara Province, Turkey. Its population is 100 (2022).
