= Çaylakköy, Göynük =

Çaylakköy
- Village
- Location within Turkey
- Coordinates: 40.379066925654975°N 30.924917958969093°E
- Country: Turkey
- Province: Bolu
- District: Göynük
- Population (2021): 155
- Time zone: UTC+3 (TRT)

Çaylakköy (also: Çaylak) is a village in the Göynük District, Bolu Province, Turkey. Its population is 155 (2021).
