= Buzağılık, Susurluk =

Village in Turkey

Buzağılık
- Neighbourhood
- Location in Turkey Buzağılık (Marmara)
- Coordinates: 39°54′N 28°10′E
- Country: Turkey
- Province: Balıkesir
- District: Susurluk
- Population (2022): 236
- Time zone: UTC+3 (TRT)

Buzağılık is a neighbourhood in the municipality and district of Susurluk, Balıkesir Province in Turkey. Its population is 236 (2022).
