= Kuruçay, Çubuk =

Kuruçay
- Neighbourhood
- Location in Turkey Kuruçay (Turkey Central Anatolia)
- Coordinates: 40.3678°N 32.9596°E
- Country: Turkey
- Province: Ankara
- District: Çubuk
- Population (2022): 253
- Time zone: UTC+3 (TRT)

Kuruçay is a neighbourhood in the municipality and district of Çubuk, Ankara Province, Turkey. Its population is 253 (2022).

== History ==
There are some relics from the Ottoman period in the village. The remains of a castle stand on the top of the mountain Kaletepe (elevation 1869 m).

== Population ==
Historical population
Year	Pop.	±% p.a.
1997	517	—
2007	436	−1.69%
2012	377	−2.87%
2017	314	−3.59%
2022	253	−4.23%
Source: 1997 census and TÜIK (2007-2022)
