= İclaliye, Susurluk =

Village in Turkey

İclaliye
- Neighbourhood
- Location in Turkey İclaliye (Marmara)
- Coordinates: 39°58′37″N 28°04′05″E
- Country: Turkey
- Province: Balıkesir
- District: Susurluk
- Population (2022): 78
- Time zone: UTC+3 (TRT)

İclaliye is a neighbourhood in the municipality and district of Susurluk, Balıkesir Province in Turkey. Its population is 78 (2022).
