= Umurlar, Göynük =

Umurlar
- Village
- Location within Turkey
- Coordinates: 40.3485°N 30.8811°E
- Country: Turkey
- Province: Bolu
- District: Göynük
- Population (2021): 150
- Time zone: UTC+3 (TRT)

Umurlar is a village in the Göynük District, Bolu Province, Turkey. Its population is 150 (2021).
