= Çapar, Göynük =

Çapar
- Village
- Location within Turkey
- Coordinates: 40.2404°N 31.0238°E
- Country: Turkey
- Province: Bolu
- District: Göynük
- Population (2021): 19
- Time zone: UTC+3 (TRT)

Çapar is a village in the Göynük District, Bolu Province, Turkey. Its population is 19 (2021).
