= Demirci, Çubuk =

Demirci
- Neighbourhood
- Location in Turkey Demirci (Turkey Central Anatolia)
- Coordinates: 40.3345°N 33.2187°E
- Country: Turkey
- Province: Ankara
- District: Çubuk
- Population (2022): 118
- Time zone: UTC+3 (TRT)

Demirci is a neighbourhood in the municipality and district of Çubuk, Ankara Province, Turkey. Its population is 118 (2022).
