= Kılavuzlar, Göynük =

Kılavuzlar
- Village
- Location within Turkey
- Country: Turkey
- Province: Bolu
- District: Göynük
- Population (2021): 85
- Time zone: UTC+3 (TRT)

Kılavuzlar is a village in the Göynük District, Bolu Province, Turkey. Its population is 85 (2021).
