= Kozcağız, Göynük =

Kozcağız
- Village
- Location within Turkey
- Coordinates: 40.4179°N 30.8939°E
- Country: Turkey
- Province: Bolu
- District: Göynük
- Population (2021): 130
- Time zone: UTC+3 (TRT)

Kozcağız is a village in the Göynük District, Bolu Province, Turkey. Its population is 130 (2021).
