= Bigadiç =

- District and municipality
- Map showing Bigadiç District in Balıkesir Province

- Location within Turkey Location within Marmara
- Coordinates: 39°23′33″N 28°07′52″E
- Country: Turkey
- Province: Balıkesir

Government
  - Mayor: İsmail Avcu (AKP)
- Area: 1,108 km^{2} (428 sq mi)
- Elevation: 160 m (520 ft)
- Population (2022): 48,917
  - Density: 44.15/km^{2} (114.3/sq mi)
- Time zone: UTC+3 (TRT)
- Postal code: 10440
- Area code: 0266
- Website: www.bigadic.bel.tr

Bigadiç is a municipality and district of Balıkesir Province, Turkey. Its area is 1,108 km^{2}, and its population is 48,917 (2022). As former Ancient bishopric of Achyraus, it remains a Latin Catholic titular see.

Bigadiç has the largest Boron reserves of both Turkey and the world. Also, villages of Bigadiç have natural thermal water reserves which contains Selenium and Sulfur.

== Etymology ==
The oldest known name of Bigadiç is ancient Greek Achyraos (Αχυράους in Ancient Greek), Latin(ized) Achyraus, renamed during the Byzantine era Pegadia (Πηγάδια), which means "springs, wells", from which it evolved to Begadia, to Begados, and eventually to the turkified name Bugadıç. Some support the popular etymology that Boğadıç would mean "Bull meadow" (Boğa being the Turkish word for a bull).

== History ==
The city of Achyraous was captured by Turkoman ghazis in the late 13th century, although it was briefly reconquered by the Byzantines during the Meander campaigns of Alexios Philanthropenos, after he defeated a Turkoman army in the region.

== Composition ==
There are 80 neighbourhoods in Bigadiç District:

- 4 Eylül
- Abacı
- Adalı
- Akyar
- Alanköy
- Altınlar
- Aşağıçamlı
- Aşağıgöcek
- Babaköy
- Bademli
- Balatlı
- Başçeşme
- Beğendikler
- Bekirler
- Bozbük
- Çağış
- Cami
- Çamköy
- Çavuş
- Çayüstü
- Çekirdekli
- Çeribaşı
- Çıtak
- Çömlekçi
- Davutça
- Davutlar
- Dedeçınar
- Değirmenli
- Dere Çerkes
- Dikkonak
- Doğançam
- Dündarcık
- Durasılar
- Elyapan
- Emek
- Emirler
- Esenli
- Fethibey
- Güvemçetmi
- Hacıömerderesi
- Hamidiye
- Hisarköy
- İğciler
- İlyaslar
- Işıklar
- İskeleköy
- Kadıköy
- Kalafat
- Karabahçe
- Kargın
- Kayalıdere
- Kayırlar
- Kırca
- Kızılçukur
- Köseler
- Kozpınar
- Küçükyeniköy
- Kürsü
- Kuyu
- Mecidiye
- Meyvalı
- Okçular
- Okçularyeri
- Orta
- Osmanca
- Özgören
- Panayır
- Salmanlı
- Servi
- Topalak
- Tozağan
- Turfullar
- Yağcıbedir
- Yağcılar
- Yeniköy
- Yeşildere
- Yolbaşı
- Yörücekler
- Yukarıçamlı
- Yukarıgöçek

== Ecclesiastical history ==
Ancient Achyraus was situated in the Roman province of Hellespontus, in the civil Diocese of Pontus. Circa 400 it became a suffragan see of the provincial capital and metropolitan see Cyzicus, in the sway of Patriarchate of Constantinople.

It is held either identical with former episcopal see Adrianothera, or to have supplanted a neighbouring bishopric of that name, as the Byzantine imperial Notitia Episcopatuum still listed that name in the tenth century, thereafter only Achiraus from the 11th until the thirteenth century.

Four bishops of Adrianothera are known because of their participation in church councils :

- Patricius in the Council of Chalcedon in 451
- Cyprianus in the Second Council of Constantinople in 553
- Basilius in the Second Council of Nicaea in 787
- Gregorius in the 'Photian' Council of Constantinople (879) which restored its Patriarch Photius I.

Two 13th-century bishops of Achyraus are recorded under that title in the thirteenth century : Leo and Laurentius.

Although it was suppressed as a residential Byzantine see (circa 900?), one Tommaso (no other prelature) was appointed Latin Coadjutor Bishop of Achyraus (1505.06.06 – ?).

=== Titular see ===
The diocese of Achyraus was nominally restored in 1933 by the Catholic Church as Latin titular bishopric of Achyraus (Latin) / Achirao (Curiate Italian) / Achyraën(sis) (Latin adjective).

It is vacant, having had the following incumbents, so far of the fitting Episcopal (lowest) rank and members of Latin congregations :

- Victor Bazin, Paris Foreign Missions Society (M.E.P.) (1953.05.07 – 1955.01.01) as last Apostolic Vicar of Rangoon (Burma = Myanmar) (1953.05.07 – 1955.01.01); next (see) promoted first Metropolitan Archbishop of Rangoon (Myanmar) (1955.01.01 – retired 1971.06.19), President of Myanmar Catholic Bishops’ Conference (1967 – 1969), died 1975
- Cesário Alexandre Minali, Capuchin Friars Minor (O.F.M. Cap.) (born Italy) (1955.03.01 – 1969.06.13), first as Bishop-Prelate of Territorial Prelature of Alto Solimões (Brazil) (1955.03.01 – 1958.04.09), then as Bishop-Prelate of Territorial Prelature of Carolina (Brazil) (1958.04.09 – death 1969.06.13)
- Augustín Van Aaken, Divine Word Missionaries (S.V.D.) (born Germany) (1972.07.25 – death 1990.08.11) as Bishop-Prelate of Territorial Prelature of Alto Paraná (Paraguay) (1972.07.25 – death 1990.04.19).

== Sources and external links ==
- District governor's official website (in Turkish)
- GCatholic - (former &) titular see
- Turkish Statistical Institute's official website (in English)

Bibliography - ecclesiastical history

- Konrad Eubel, Hierarchia Catholica Medii Aevi, vol. 3, p. 217.
- Pius Bonifacius Gams, Series episcoporum Ecclesiae Catholicae, Leipzig 1931, p. 445
- Michel Lequien, Oriens christianus in quatuor Patriarchatus digestus, Paris 1740, vol. I, coll. 771–772
- S. Pétridès, lemma 'Achyraus' in Dictionnaire d'Histoire et de Géographie ecclésiastiques, vol. I, Paris 1909, col. 333
