= Karaağaç, Çubuk =

Karaağaç
- Neighbourhood
- Country: Turkey
- Province: Ankara
- District: Çubuk
- Population (2022): 32
- Time zone: UTC+3 (TRT)

Karaağaç is a neighbourhood in the municipality and district of Çubuk, Ankara Province, Turkey. Its population is 32 as of 2022.
