= Yukarı Çavundur, Çubuk =

Yukarı Çavundur
- Neighbourhood
- Location in Turkey Yukarı Çavundur (Turkey Central Anatolia)
- Coordinates: 40°23′10″N 33°03′29″E
- Country: Turkey
- Province: Ankara
- District: Çubuk
- Population (2022): 508
- Time zone: UTC+3 (TRT)

Yukarı Çavundur is a neighbourhood in the municipality and district of Çubuk, Ankara Province, Turkey. Its population is 508 (2022). It was an independent municipality until it was merged into the municipality of Çubuk in 2008.
