= Sarıcalar, Göynük =

Sarıcalar
- Village
- Location within Turkey
- Coordinates: 40.2922°N 30.7125°E
- Country: Turkey
- Province: Bolu
- District: Göynük
- Population (2021): 181
- Time zone: UTC+3 (TRT)

Sarıcalar is a village in the Göynük District, Bolu Province, Turkey. Its population is 181 (2021).
