= Danaveli, Susurluk =

Village in Turkey

Danaveli
- Neighbourhood
- Location in Turkey Danaveli (Marmara)
- Coordinates: 39°48′N 28°06′E
- Country: Turkey
- Province: Balıkesir
- District: Susurluk
- Population (2022): 434
- Time zone: UTC+3 (TRT)

Danaveli is a neighbourhood in the municipality and district of Susurluk, Balıkesir Province in Turkey. Its population is 434 (2022).
