= Susurluk =

- District and municipality
- Map showing Susurluk District in Balıkesir Province

- Location within Turkey Location within Marmara
- Coordinates: 39°54′53″N 28°9′25″E
- Country: Turkey
- Province: Balıkesir

Government
  - Mayor: Hakan Yıldırım Semizel (CHP)
- Area: 652 km^{2} (252 sq mi)
- Population (2022): 37,724
  - Density: 57.9/km^{2} (150/sq mi)
- Time zone: UTC+3 (TRT)
- Postal code: 10600
- Area code: 0266
- Website: www.susurluk.bel.tr

Susurluk is a municipality and district of Balıkesir Province, Turkey. Its area is 652 km^{2}, and its population is 37,724 (2022). It is famous for its production of soap and dairy products.

The highway from Istanbul to İzmir passes through Susurluk. In Turkey Susurluk is known for its 'tost' (susurluk tostu) - a toasted cheese sandwich with tomato paste, and for its foamy ayran. The mayor is Hakan Yıldırım Semizel (CHP).

== History ==
Originally, the place where Susurluk is now located was an empty area of forest and swamp belonging to Karasi Bey. Under Bey's grandchildren, it was managed as a farm called Susığırlık. Later, in 1634, with raiders coming from Karaman, Hacı Hatip Oğulları, settled here. While Susığırlık was only a farm, it began to serve as a rest stop for caravans passing to Bursa and Istanbul. Later, it became crowded with Bulgarian and Caucasian immigrants who migrated to Anatolia during the 1858 and 1878 Turkish-Russian war and Turkmen tribes that were later settled by Ahmed Vefik Pasha.

=== 1996 scandal ===
On 3 November 1996 a car crash in the town made news headlines as the dead and injured included a parliamentary deputy, a right-wing gang leader, a former beauty queen and a senior police officer.

The resulting political and social turmoil has come to be known as the Susurluk scandal, and the accident was described as definite proof of a link between politics, organized crime and the bureaucracy, known in Turkish as the derin devlet ("deep state").

Several people, including three former special forces members, were convicted of illegal activities and served prison terms.

== Composition ==
There are 54 neighbourhoods in Susurluk District:

- Alibey
- Asmalıdere
- Aziziye
- Babaköy
- Balıklıdere
- Beyköy
- Bozen
- Burhaniye
- Buzağılık
- Danaveli
- Demirkapı
- Dereköy
- Duman
- Ekinlik
- Eminpınarı
- Esentepe
- Göbel
- Gökçeağaç
- Gökçedere
- Günaydın
- Gürece
- Han
- İclaliye
- Ilıcaboğazı
- Kalfaköy
- Karaköy
- Karapürçek
- Karşıyaka
- Kayalıdere
- Kayıkçı
- Kepekler
- Kirazköy
- Kışla
- Kocapınar
- Kulat
- Kurucaoluk
- Muradiye
- Odalıdam
- Okçugöl
- Ömerköy
- Orta
- Paşaköy
- Reşadiye
- Söğütçayırı
- Söve
- Sülecik
- Sultançayırı
- Sultaniye
- Ümiteli
- Yağcı
- Yahyaköy
- Yaylaçayırı
- Yeni
- Yıldız

== See also ==
- Tradition and Change in a Turkish Town, a book documenting the town
