= Ceylanlı, Göynük =

Ceylanlı
- Village
- Location within Turkey
- Coordinates: 40.227551°N 31.035091°E
- Country: Turkey
- Province: Bolu
- District: Göynük
- Population (2021): 44
- Time zone: UTC+3 (TRT)

Ceylanlı is a village in the Göynük District, Bolu Province, Turkey. Its population is 44 (2021).
