= Gerişler, Göynük =

Gerişler
- Village
- Location within Turkey
- Coordinates: 40°20′N 30°37′E
- Country: Turkey
- Province: Bolu
- District: Göynük
- Population (2021): 207
- Time zone: UTC+3 (TRT)

Gerişler is a village in the Göynük District, Bolu Province, Turkey. Its population is 207 (2021).
