= Hacıömerderesi, Bigadiç =

Village in Turkey

Hacıömerderesi
- Neighbourhood
- Location in Turkey Hacıömerderesi (Marmara)
- Coordinates: 39°20′00″N 28°34′15″E
- Country: Turkey
- Province: Balıkesir
- District: Bigadiç
- Population (2022): 173
- Time zone: UTC+3 (TRT)

Hacıömerderesi is a neighbourhood in the municipality and district of Bigadiç, Balıkesir Province in Turkey. Its population is 173 (2022).
