= Bölücekova, Göynük =

Bölücekova
- Village
- Location within Turkey
- Coordinates: 40°16′N 30°49′E
- Country: Turkey
- Province: Bolu
- District: Göynük
- Population (2021): 180
- Time zone: UTC+3 (TRT)

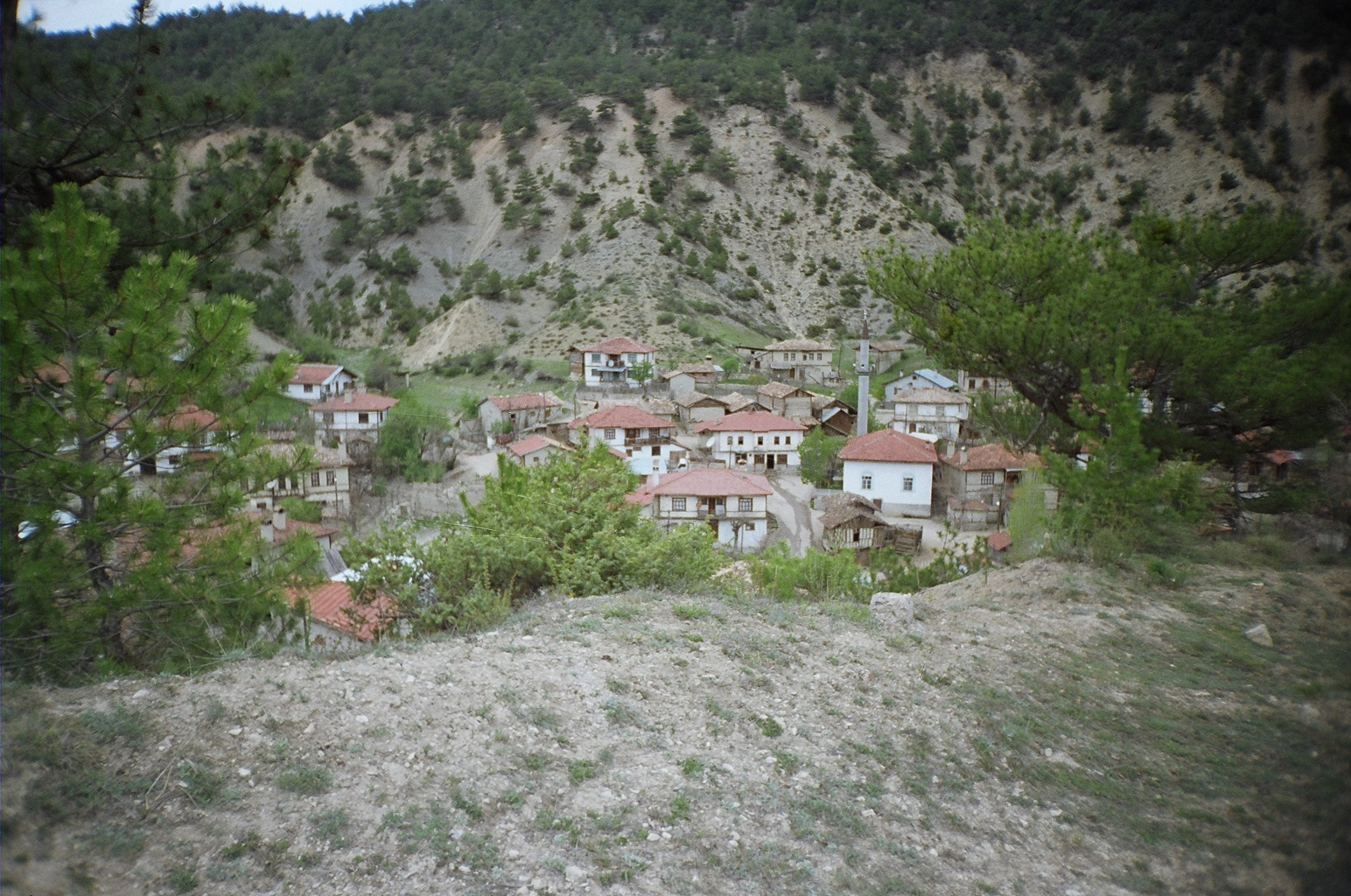
Göynük-Bölücekova Köyü

Bölücekova is a village in the Göynük District, Bolu Province, Turkey. Its population is 180 (2021).
