= Gümüşyayla, Çubuk =

Gümüşyayla
- Neighbourhood
- Location in Turkey Gümüşyayla (Turkey Central Anatolia)
- Coordinates: 40°13′N 32°53′E
- Country: Turkey
- Province: Ankara
- District: Çubuk
- Population (2022): 103
- Time zone: UTC+3 (TRT)

Gümüşyayla is a neighbourhood in the municipality and district of Çubuk, Ankara Province, Turkey. Its population is 103 (2022).
