= Kösrelik, Çubuk =

Kösrelik
- Neighbourhood
- Country: Turkey
- Province: Ankara
- District: Çubuk
- Population (2022): 155
- Time zone: UTC+3 (TRT)

Kösrelik is a neighbourhood in the municipality and district of Çubuk, Ankara Province, Turkey. Its population is 155 (2022).
