= Tradition and Change in a Turkish Town =

Tradition and Change in a Turkish Town is a 1974 non-fiction book by Paul J. Magnarella, published by John Wiley and Sons.

It is a study of Susurluk, which he observed beginning in 1969. He lived with a host family in the town.

== Content ==
There are ten chapters in the book. The overall environment, the geography and history, the ethnography, and the economy are in chapters 1, 2, 3, and 4, respectively. The Anthropological details are in the remaining chapters.

There are also two appendices, characterized by John Kolars of the University of Michigan as "brief".

As a supplement, the book's author created a set of color slides, totaling 36, that could be used for academic reasons.

== Reception ==
C. H. Dodd of the University of Hull described the book as "almost wholly convincing" and "extremely interesting" even though the prose was "descriptive, fancy-free" and occasionally "pedestrian".

Reviewer Susan Dwyer-Shick stated that the book is "very useful" in regards to ethnographic aspects, and that the book "well carried out" the presentation of the content almost all of the time. She argued that a glossary would have provided help to the reader.

According to Kolars, "the insistence on the importance of individuals" is "a major contribution" of the book.
