= Avcıova, Çubuk =

Avcıova
- Neighbourhood
- Location in Turkey Avcıova (Turkey Central Anatolia)
- Coordinates: 40°26′N 33°02′E
- Country: Turkey
- Province: Ankara
- District: Çubuk
- Population (2022): 45
- Time zone: UTC+3 (TRT)

Avcıova is a neighbourhood in the municipality and district of Çubuk, Ankara Province, Turkey. Its population is 45 (2022).
