= Durhasan, Çubuk =

Durhasan
- Neighbourhood
- Location in Turkey Durhasan (Turkey Central Anatolia)
- Coordinates: 40.3344°N 32.9365°E
- Country: Turkey
- Province: Ankara
- District: Çubuk
- Population (2022): 115
- Time zone: UTC+3 (TRT)

Durhasan is a neighbourhood in the municipality and district of Çubuk, Ankara Province, Turkey. Its population is 115 (2022).
