= Dağkalafat, Çubuk =

Dağkalafat
- Neighbourhood
- Location in Turkey Dağkalafat (Turkey Central Anatolia)
- Coordinates: 40°23′N 33°07′E
- Country: Turkey
- Province: Ankara
- District: Çubuk
- Population (2022): 91
- Time zone: UTC+3 (TRT)

Dağkalafat is a neighbourhood in the municipality and district of Çubuk, Ankara Province, Turkey. Its population is 91 (2022).
