= Melikşah, Çubuk =

Melikşah
- Neighbourhood
- Location in Turkey Melikşah (Turkey Central Anatolia)
- Coordinates: 40.1637°N 32.9457°E
- Country: Turkey
- Province: Ankara
- District: Çubuk
- Population (2022): 644
- Time zone: UTC+3 (TRT)

Melikşah is a neighbourhood in the municipality and district of Çubuk, Ankara Province, Turkey. Its population is 644 (2022).

== History ==
The name of the village comes from the Seljuk emperor Malik-Shah I who set up a pavilion on an ancient Roman bath.

The Battle of Ankara was fought on 20 July 1402 at these locations between the forces of the Ottoman Sultan Bayezid I and Timur, ruler of the Timurids.

== Geography ==
The village is 22 miles (~35 km) away from city of Ankara, 11 miles (~17 km) to Çubuk and 10 miles (~16 km) to Esenboga International Airport. The village is located in Ankara metropolitan area, therefore its official status is neighborhood. Continental climate is observed in the area.

== Population ==
Historical population
| Year | Pop. | ±% p.a. |
|---|---|---|
| 1997 | 542 | — |
| 2007 | 746 | +3.25% |
| 2012 | 713 | −0.90% |
| 2017 | 676 | −1.06% |
| 2022 | 644 | −0.97% |
Source: 1997 census and TÜIK (2007-2022)

== Infrastructure ==
There is an elementary school in the village. The village has drinkable water and sewerage network.

Health services are provided by the clinic. The road connecting the village to the main roads are asphalt. There is also an olympic swimming pool, which was inactivated and abandoned in 2014.
