= Eskiçöte, Çubuk =

Eskiçöte
- Neighbourhood
- Location in Turkey Eskiçöte (Turkey Central Anatolia)
- Coordinates: 40°13′N 33°13′E
- Country: Turkey
- Province: Ankara
- District: Çubuk
- Population (2022): 112
- Time zone: UTC+3 (TRT)

Eskiçöte is a neighbourhood in the municipality and district of Çubuk, Ankara Province, Turkey. Its population is 112 (2022).
