= Alanköy, Göynük =

Alanköy
- Village
- Location within Turkey
- Coordinates: 40.3817°N 30.9734°E
- Country: Turkey
- Province: Bolu
- District: Göynük
- Population (2021): 115
- Time zone: UTC+3 (TRT)

Alanköy is a village in the Göynük District, Bolu Province, Turkey. Its population is 115 (2021).
