= Uluağaç, Çubuk =

Uluağaç
- Neighbourhood
- Location in Turkey Uluağaç (Turkey Central Anatolia)
- Coordinates: 40.4739°N 32.9300°E
- Country: Turkey
- Province: Ankara
- District: Çubuk
- Population (2022): 67
- Time zone: UTC+3 (TRT)

Uluağaç is a neighbourhood in the municipality and district of Çubuk, Ankara Province, Turkey. Its population is 67 (2022).
