= Gürpınar, Göynük =

Gürpınar
- Village
- Location within Turkey
- Coordinates: 40.1920°N 30.8852°E
- Country: Turkey
- Province: Bolu
- District: Göynük
- Population (2023): 239
- Time zone: UTC+3 (TRT)

Gürpınar is a village in the Göynük District, Bolu Province, Turkey. Its population is 239 (2023).

== Naming History ==
The village is recorded as being named Eşekgerişi in 1487, and as Merkepgerişi in 1928.

== Population ==
Historical population
Year	Pop.	±% p.a.
1985	404	—
1990	382	−1.11%
1997	342	−1.57%
2007	320	−0.66%
2012	258	−4.22%
2017	235	−1.85%
2023	239	+0.28%
Source: Population censuses (1985-1997) and TÜİK (2007-2023)
