= Asmalıdere, Susurluk =

Village in Turkey

Asmalıdere
- Neighbourhood
- Location in Turkey Asmalıdere (Marmara)
- Coordinates: 39.8481°N 28.0131°E
- Country: Turkey
- Province: Balıkesir
- District: Susurluk
- Population (2022): 81
- Time zone: UTC+3 (TRT)

Asmalıdere is a neighbourhood in the municipality and district of Susurluk, Balıkesir Province in Turkey. Its population is 81 (2022).
