= Beğendikler, Bigadiç =

Village in Turkey

Beğendikler
- Neighbourhood
- Location in Turkey Beğendikler (Marmara)
- Coordinates: 39°30′N 28°12′E
- Country: Turkey
- Province: Balıkesir
- District: Bigadiç
- Population (2022): 420
- Time zone: UTC+3 (TRT)

Beğendikler is a neighbourhood in the municipality and district of Bigadiç, Balıkesir Province in Turkey. Its population is 420 (2022).
