= Sığırlıhacı, Çubuk =

Sığırlıhacı
- Neighbourhood
- Location in Turkey Sığırlıhacı (Turkey Central Anatolia)
- Coordinates: 40°14′N 32°58′E
- Country: Turkey
- Province: Ankara
- District: Çubuk
- Population (2022): 108
- Time zone: UTC+3 (TRT)

Sığırlıhacı is a neighbourhood in the municipality and district of Çubuk, Ankara Province, Turkey. Its population is 108 (2022).
