= Değirmenözü, Göynük =

Değirmenözü
- Village
- Location within Turkey
- Coordinates: 40.4470°N 30.7439°E
- Country: Turkey
- Province: Bolu
- District: Göynük
- Population (2021): 112
- Time zone: UTC+3 (TRT)

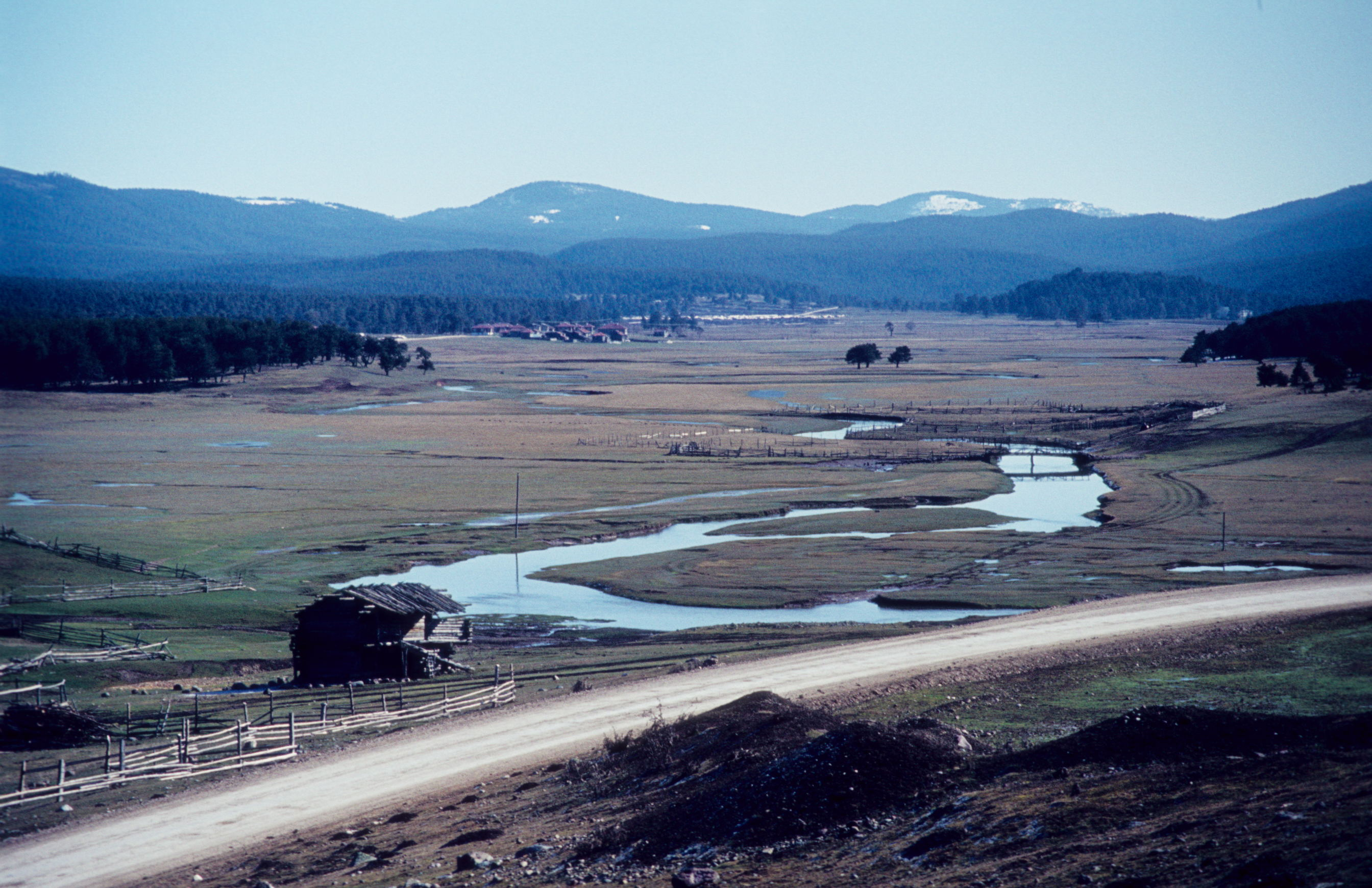
On the extensive plateaus of the Aladağ massif in the Körgoğlu Dağları south of Bolu are extensive summer pastures (Yayla) of the lower villages, such as Değirmenözü-Yayla or Kızık-Yayla, used for centuries.

Değirmenözü is a village in the Göynük District, Bolu Province, Turkey. Its population is 112 (2021).
