= Köseler, Bigadiç =

Village in Turkey

Köseler
- Neighbourhood
- Location in Turkey Köseler (Marmara)
- Coordinates: 39°22′34″N 28°27′13″E
- Country: Turkey
- Province: Balıkesir
- District: Bigadiç
- Population (2022): 26
- Time zone: UTC+3 (TRT)

Köseler is a neighbourhood in the municipality and district of Bigadiç, Balıkesir Province in Turkey. Its population is 26 (2022).
