= Yukarıkınık, Göynük =

Yukarıkınık
- Village
- Location within Turkey
- Coordinates: 40°11′N 30°42′E
- Country: Turkey
- Province: Bolu
- District: Göynük
- Population (2021): 197
- Time zone: UTC+3 (TRT)

Yukarıkınık is a village in the Göynük District, Bolu Province, Turkey. Its population is 197 (2021).
