= Sünnet, Göynük =

Sünnet
- Village
- Location within Turkey
- Coordinates: 40.3998°N 30.9614°E
- Country: Turkey
- Province: Bolu
- District: Göynük
- Population (2021): 144
- Time zone: UTC+3 (TRT)

Sünnet is a village in the Göynük District, Bolu Province, Turkey. Its population is 144 (2021).

The name "Sünnet" means circumcision ceremony.
