= Köybaşı, Göynük =

Köybaşı
- Village
- Location within Turkey
- Coordinates: 40.3180°N 30.6695°E
- Country: Turkey
- Province: Bolu
- District: Göynük
- Population (2021): 91
- Time zone: UTC+3 (TRT)

Köybaşı is a village in the Göynük District, Bolu Province, Turkey. Its population is 91 (2021).
