= Hilaller, Göynük =

Hilaller
- Village
- Location within Turkey
- Coordinates: 40°20′N 30°38′E
- Country: Turkey
- Province: Bolu
- District: Göynük
- Population (2021): 97
- Time zone: UTC+3 (TRT)

Hilaller is a village in the Göynük District, Bolu Province, Turkey. Its population is 97 (2021).
