= Esenboğa, Çubuk =

Esenboğa
- Neighbourhood
- Location in Turkey Esenboğa (Turkey Central Anatolia)
- Coordinates: 40°08′N 32°59′E
- Country: Turkey
- Province: Ankara
- District: Çubuk
- Population (2022): 1,712
- Time zone: UTC+3 (TRT)

Esenboğa, also Esenboğa Merkez, is a neighbourhood in the municipality and district of Çubuk, Ankara Province, Turkey. Its population is 1,712 (2022). It was an independent municipality until it was merged into the municipality of Çubuk in 2008.

The name of the neighbourhood comes from the village of Esenboğa (the ğ is silent), which literally means "Windflowing Bull" or "Serene Bull", the modernized form of Isen Buqa, the name of a Turkic warlord in the army of Timur who settled his troops here during the Battle of Ankara in 1402.
