= Davutça, Bigadiç =

Village in Turkey

Davutça
- Neighbourhood
- Location in Turkey Davutça (Marmara)
- Coordinates: 39°25′25″N 28°21′34″E
- Country: Turkey
- Province: Balıkesir
- District: Bigadiç
- Population (2022): 139
- Time zone: UTC+3 (TRT)

Davutça is a neighbourhood in the municipality and district of Bigadiç, Balıkesir Province in Turkey. Its population is 139 (2022).
