= Durasılar, Bigadiç =

Village in Turkey

Durasılar
- Neighbourhood
- Location in Turkey Durasılar (Marmara)
- Coordinates: 39°23′56″N 28°13′48″E
- Country: Turkey
- Province: Balıkesir
- District: Bigadiç
- Population (2022): 390
- Time zone: UTC+3 (TRT)

Durasılar is a neighbourhood in the municipality and district of Bigadiç, Balıkesir Province in Turkey. Its population is 390 (2022).
