= Hacılar, Çubuk =

Hacılar
- Neighbourhood
- Location in Turkey Hacılar (Turkey Central Anatolia)
- Coordinates: 40.4014°N 33.0417°E
- Country: Turkey
- Province: Ankara
- District: Çubuk
- Population (2022): 81
- Time zone: UTC+3 (TRT)

Hacılar is a neighbourhood in the municipality and district of Çubuk, Ankara Province, Turkey. Its population is 81 (2022).
