= Ekinciler, Göynük =

Ekinciler
- Village
- Location within Turkey
- Coordinates: 40.41363°N 30.593609°E
- Country: Turkey
- Province: Bolu
- District: Göynük
- Population (2021): 210
- Time zone: UTC+3 (TRT)

Ekinciler is a village in the Göynük District, Bolu Province, Turkey. Its population is 210 (2021).
