= Yazır, Çubuk =

Yazır
- Neighbourhood
- Location in Turkey Yazır (Turkey Central Anatolia)
- Coordinates: 40.1844°N 32.9749°E
- Country: Turkey
- Province: Ankara
- District: Çubuk
- Population (2022): 232
- Time zone: UTC+3 (TRT)

Yazır is a neighbourhood in the municipality and district of Çubuk, Ankara Province, Turkey. Its population is 232 (2022).
