= Dündarcık, Bigadiç =

Village in Turkey

Dündarcık
- Neighbourhood
- Location in Turkey Dündarcık (Marmara)
- Coordinates: 39°25′11″N 28°25′54″E
- Country: Turkey
- Province: Balıkesir
- District: Bigadiç
- Population (2022): 99
- Time zone: UTC+3 (TRT)

Dündarcık is a neighbourhood in the municipality and district of Bigadiç, Balıkesir Province in Turkey. Its population is 99 (2022).
