= Alanköy, Bigadiç =

Village in Turkey

Alanköy
- Neighbourhood
- Location in Turkey Alanköy (Marmara)
- Coordinates: 39.343°N 28.494°E
- Country: Turkey
- Province: Balıkesir
- District: Bigadiç
- Population (2022): 79
- Time zone: UTC+3 (TRT)

Alanköy is a neighbourhood in the municipality and district of Bigadiç, Balıkesir Province in Turkey. Its population is 79 (2022).
