= Sele, Çubuk =

Sele
- Neighbourhood
- Location in Turkey Sele (Turkey Central Anatolia)
- Coordinates: 40.3353°N 33.0428°E
- Country: Turkey
- Province: Ankara
- District: Çubuk
- Population (2022): 20
- Time zone: UTC+3 (TRT)

Sele is a neighbourhood in the municipality and district of Çubuk, Ankara Province, Turkey. Its population is 20 (2022).
