= Nusratlar, Çubuk =

Nusratlar
- Neighbourhood
- Location in Turkey Nusratlar (Turkey Central Anatolia)
- Coordinates: 40°26′N 32°59′E
- Country: Turkey
- Province: Ankara
- District: Çubuk
- Population (2022): 73
- Time zone: UTC+3 (TRT)

Nusratlar is a neighbourhood in the municipality and district of Çubuk, Ankara Province, Turkey. Its population is 73 (2022).
