= Çatacık, Göynük =

Çatacık
- Village
- Location within Turkey
- Coordinates: 40.4151°N 31.0097°E
- Country: Turkey
- Province: Bolu
- District: Göynük
- Population (2021): 128
- Time zone: UTC+3 (TRT)

Çatacık is a village in the Göynük District, Bolu Province, Turkey. Its population is 128 (2021).
