= Çömlekçi, Bigadiç =

Village in Turkey

Çömlekçi
- Neighbourhood
- Location in Turkey Çömlekçi (Marmara)
- Coordinates: 39.496°N 28.043°E
- Country: Turkey
- Province: Balıkesir
- District: Bigadiç
- Population (2022): 559
- Time zone: UTC+3 (TRT)

Çömlekçi is a neighbourhood in the municipality and district of Bigadiç, Balıkesir Province in Turkey. Its population is 559 (2022).
