= Çamköy, Bigadiç =

Village in Turkey

Çamköy
- Neighbourhood
- Location in Turkey Çamköy (Marmara)
- Coordinates: 39.467°N 28.191°E
- Country: Turkey
- Province: Balıkesir
- District: Bigadiç
- Population (2022): 354
- Time zone: UTC+3 (TRT)

Çamköy is a neighbourhood in the municipality and district of Bigadiç, Balıkesir Province in Turkey. Its population is 354 (2022).
