= Karacalar, Göynük =

Karacalar
- Village
- Location within Turkey
- Country: Turkey
- Province: Bolu
- District: Göynük
- Population (2021): 161
- Time zone: UTC+3 (TRT)

Karacalar is a village in the Göynük District, Bolu Province, Turkey. Its population was 161 as of 2021.
