= Karaaliler, Göynük =

Karaaliler
- Village
- Location within Turkey
- Coordinates: 40.3144°N 31.0056°E
- Country: Turkey
- Province: Bolu
- District: Göynük
- Population (2021): 68
- Time zone: UTC+3 (TRT)

Karaaliler is a village in the Göynük District, Bolu Province, Turkey. Its population is 68 (2021).
