= Demirhanlar, Göynük =

Demirhanlar
- Village
- Location within Turkey
- Coordinates: 40.2420°N 30.8891°E
- Country: Turkey
- Province: Bolu
- District: Göynük
- Population (2021): 143
- Time zone: UTC+3 (TRT)

Demirhanlar is a village in the Göynük District, Bolu Province, Turkey. Its population is 143 (2021).
