= Akyar, Bigadiç =

Village in Turkey

Akyar
- Neighbourhood
- Location in Turkey Akyar (Marmara)
- Coordinates: 39.464°N 28.000°E
- Country: Turkey
- Province: Balıkesir
- District: Bigadiç
- Population (2022): 1,126
- Time zone: UTC+3 (TRT)

Akyar is a neighbourhood in the municipality and district of Bigadiç, Balıkesir Province in Turkey. Its population is 1,126 (2022).
