= Tepebaşı, Göynük =

Tepebaşı
- Village
- Location within Turkey
- Coordinates: 40.3636°N 30.8126°E
- Country: Turkey
- Province: Bolu
- District: Göynük
- Population (2021): 157
- Time zone: UTC+3 (TRT)

Tepebaşı is a village in the Göynük District, Bolu Province, Turkey. Its population is 157 (2021).
