= Mustanlar, Göynük =

Mustanlar
- Village
- Location within Turkey
- Coordinates: 40°27′N 30°36′E
- Country: Turkey
- Province: Bolu
- District: Göynük
- Population (2021): 117
- Time zone: UTC+3 (TRT)

Mustanlar is a village in the Göynük District, Bolu Province, Turkey. Its population is 117 (2021).
