= Ovacık, Çubuk =

Ovacık
- Neighbourhood
- Location in Turkey Ovacık (Turkey Central Anatolia)
- Coordinates: 40.3043°N 32.9640°E
- Country: Turkey
- Province: Ankara
- District: Çubuk
- Population (2022): 121
- Time zone: UTC+3 (TRT)

Ovacık is a neighbourhood in the municipality and district of Çubuk, Ankara Province, Turkey. Its population is 121 (2022).
