= Bozcaarmut, Göynük =

Bozcaarmut
- Village
- Location within Turkey
- Coordinates: 40.4520°N 30.8816°E
- Country: Turkey
- Province: Bolu
- District: Göynük
- Population (2021): 75
- Time zone: UTC+3 (TRT)

Bozcaarmut is a village in the Göynük District, Bolu Province, Turkey. Its population is 75 (2021).
