= Arıkçayırı, Göynük =

Arıkçayırı
- Village
- Location in Turkey
- Coordinates: 40°28′N 30°54′E
- Country: Turkey
- Province: Bolu
- District: Göynük
- Population (2021): 145
- Time zone: UTC+3 (TRT)

Arıkçayırı is a village in the Göynük District, Bolu Province, Turkey. Its population is 145 (2021).
