= Yörücekler, Bigadiç =

Village in Turkey

Yörücekler
- Neighbourhood
- Location in Turkey Yörücekler (Marmara)
- Coordinates: 39°21′32″N 28°4′19″E
- Country: Turkey
- Province: Balıkesir
- District: Bigadiç
- Population (2022): 178
- Time zone: UTC+3 (TRT)

Yörücekler is a neighbourhood in the municipality and district of Bigadiç, Balıkesir Province in Turkey. Its population is 178 (2022).
