= Göynük District =

District of Bolu Province, Turkey

- District
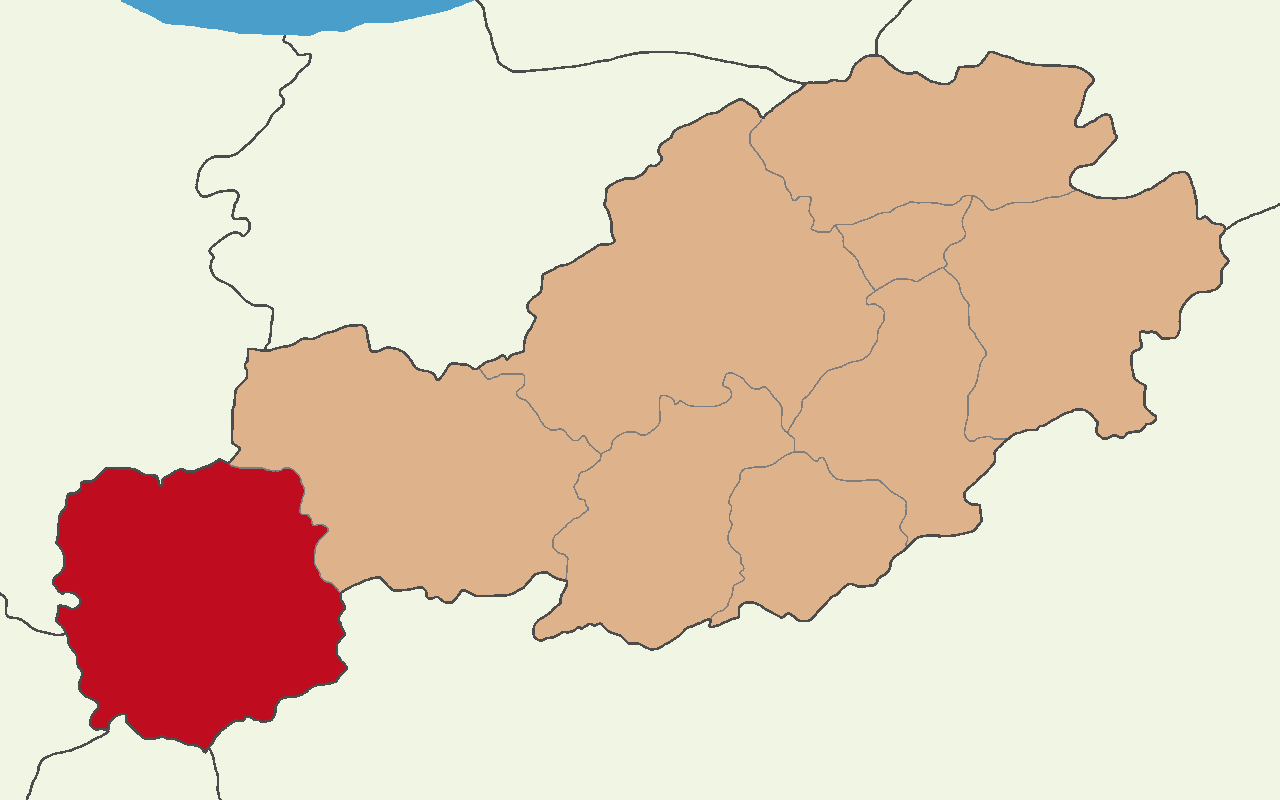
- Map showing Göynük District in Bolu Province

- Location in Turkey
- Coordinates: 40°24′N 30°47′E
- Country: Turkey
- Province: Bolu
- Seat: Göynük

Government
  - Kaymakam: Ferhat Gür
- Area: 1,407 km^{2} (543 sq mi)
- Population (2021): 14,679
  - Density: 10.43/km^{2} (27.02/sq mi)
- Time zone: UTC+3 (TRT)
- Website: www.goynukkaymakamligi.gov.tr

Göynük District is a district of the Bolu Province of Turkey. Its seat is the town of Göynük. Its area is 1,407 km^{2}, and its population is 14,679 (2021).

== Composition ==
There is one municipality in Göynük District:

- Göynük

There are 66 villages in Göynük District:

- Ahmetbeyler
- Akçaalan
- Aksaklar
- Alanköy
- Arıkçayırı
- Arızlar
- Aşağıkınık
- Bayındır
- Bekirfakılar
- Bölücekova
- Boyacılar
- Bozcaarmut
- Bulanık
- Çamlıca
- Çapar
- Çatacık
- Çayköy
- Çaylakköy
- Ceylanlı
- Çubukköy
- Dağhacılar
- Dağşeyhleri
- Dedeler
- Değirmenözü
- Demirhanlar
- Ekinciler
- Gerişler
- Gökçesaray
- Güneyçalıca
- Gürpınar
- Hacımahmut
- Hasanlar
- Hilaller
- Himmetoğlu
- Hisarözü
- İbrahimözü
- Karaaliler
- Karaardıç
- Karacalar
- Kaşıkçışeyhler
- Kayabaşı
- Kayalıdere
- Kılavuzlar
- Kilciler
- Kızılkuyu
- Köybaşı
- Kozcağız
- Kumcuk
- Kürnüç
- Kuyupınar
- Memeceler
- Mustanlar
- Narzanlar
- Örencik
- Pelitcik
- Sarıcalar
- Sarılar
- Soğukçam
- Sünnet
- Susuz
- Tekirler
- Tepebaşı
- Umurlar
- Yeniköy
- Yeşilyazı
- Yukarıkınık
