= Sülecik, Susurluk =

Village in Turkey

Sülecik
- Neighbourhood
- Location in Turkey Sülecik (Marmara)
- Coordinates: 39°50′57″N 28°10′02″E
- Country: Turkey
- Province: Balıkesir
- District: Susurluk
- Population (2022): 70
- Time zone: UTC+3 (TRT)

Sülecik (also: Sülecek, Sülücek) is a neighbourhood in the municipality and district of Susurluk, Balıkesir Province in Turkey. Its population is 70 (2022).
