= Kızılkuyu, Göynük =

Kızılkuyu
- Village
- Location within Turkey
- Country: Turkey
- Province: Bolu
- District: Göynük
- Population (2021): 181
- Time zone: UTC+3 (TRT)

Kızılkuyu is a village in the Göynük District, Bolu Province, Turkey. Its population is 181 (2021).
