= Gürece, Susurluk =

Village in Turkey

Gürece
- Neighbourhood
- Country: Turkey
- Province: Balıkesir
- District: Susurluk
- Population (2022): 320
- Time zone: UTC+3 (TRT)

Gürece is a neighbourhood in the municipality and district of Susurluk, Balıkesir Province, Turkey. As of 2022, its population is 320.
