= Eğriekin, Çubuk =

Eğriekin
- Neighbourhood
- Location in Turkey Eğriekin (Turkey Central Anatolia)
- Coordinates: 40°16′N 32°59′E
- Country: Turkey
- Province: Ankara
- District: Çubuk
- Population (2022): 78
- Time zone: UTC+3 (TRT)

Eğriekin is a village in the municipality and district of Çubuk, Ankara Province, Turkey. Its population is 78 (2022).
