= Aşağıobruk, Çubuk =

Aşağıobruk
- Neighbourhood
- Location in Turkey Aşağıobruk (Turkey Central Anatolia)
- Coordinates: 40°16′N 32°56′E
- Country: Turkey
- Province: Ankara
- District: Çubuk
- Population (2022): 36
- Time zone: UTC+3 (TRT)

Aşağıobruk is a neighbourhood in the municipality and district of Çubuk, Ankara Province, Turkey. Its population is 36 (2022).
