= Kumcuk, Göynük =

Kumcuk
- Village
- Location within Turkey
- Coordinates: 40°23′N 30°46′E
- Country: Turkey
- Province: Bolu
- District: Göynük
- Population (2021): 88
- Time zone: UTC+3 (TRT)

Kumcuk is a village in the Göynük District, Bolu Province, Turkey. Its population is 88 (2021).
