= Okçugöl, Susurluk =

Village in Turkey

Okçugöl
- Neighbourhood
- Location in Turkey Okçugöl (Marmara)
- Coordinates: 40°03′54″N 28°10′00″E
- Country: Turkey
- Province: Balıkesir
- District: Susurluk
- Population (2022): 154
- Time zone: UTC+3 (TRT)

Okçugöl is a neighbourhood in the municipality and district of Susurluk, Balıkesir Province in Turkey. Its population is 154 (2022).

== Demographics ==
The population almost entirely consists of Muhacirs from Bulgaria alongside a Crimean Tatar minority.
