= İbrahimözü, Göynük =

İbrahimözü
- Village
- Location within Turkey
- Coordinates: 40°25′N 30°41′E
- Country: Turkey
- Province: Bolu
- District: Göynük
- Population (2021): 434
- Time zone: UTC+3 (TRT)

İbrahimözü is a village in the Göynük District, Bolu Province, Turkey. Its population is 434 (2021).
