= Kurucaoluk, Susurluk =

Village in Turkey

Kurucaoluk
- Neighbourhood
- Country: Turkey
- Province: Balıkesir
- District: Susurluk
- Population (2022): 183
- Time zone: UTC+3 (TRT)

Kurucaoluk is a neighbourhood in the municipality and district of Susurluk, Balıkesir Province in Turkey. Its population is 183 (2022).
