= Karadana, Çubuk =

Karadana
- Neighbourhood
- Location in Turkey Karadana (Turkey Central Anatolia)
- Coordinates: 40.2580°N 33.1578°E
- Country: Turkey
- Province: Ankara
- District: Çubuk
- Population (2022): 123
- Time zone: UTC+3 (TRT)

Karadana is a neighbourhood in the municipality and district of Çubuk, Ankara Province, Turkey. Its population is 123 (2022).
