= Karataş, Çubuk =

Karataş
- Neighbourhood
- Location in Turkey Karataş (Turkey Central Anatolia)
- Coordinates: 40.2811°N 32.8377°E
- Country: Turkey
- Province: Ankara
- District: Çubuk
- Population (2022): 57
- Time zone: UTC+3 (TRT)

Karataş is a neighbourhood in the municipality and district of Çubuk, Ankara Province, Turkey. Its population is 57 (2022).
