= Dağşeyhleri, Göynük =

Dağşeyhleri
- Village
- Location within Turkey
- Coordinates: 40.278896°N 30.987932°E
- Country: Turkey
- Province: Bolu
- District: Göynük
- Population (2021): 69
- Time zone: UTC+3 (TRT)

Dağşeyhleri is a village in the Göynük District, Bolu Province, Turkey. Its population is 69 (2021).
