= Çubuk =

- District and municipality
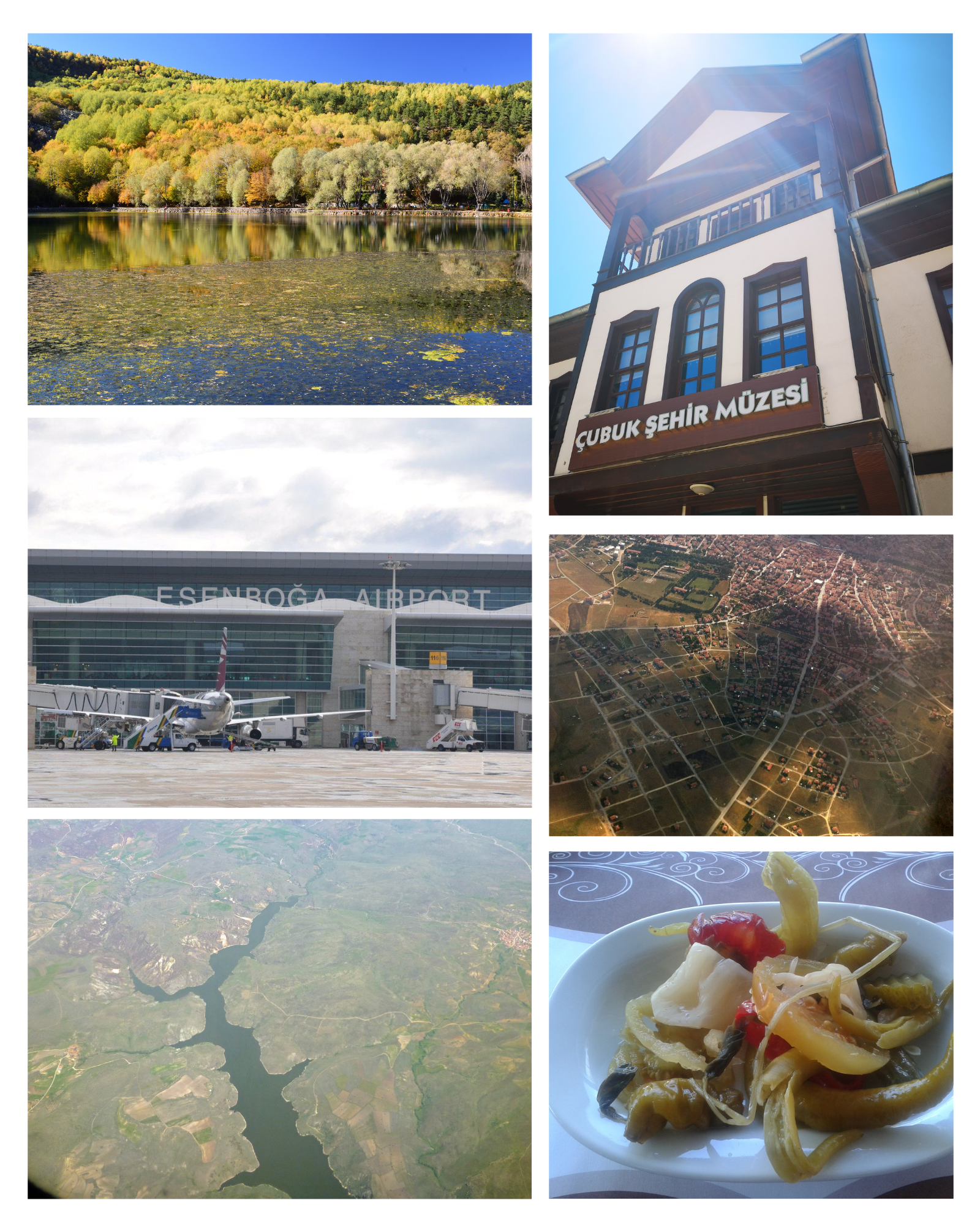
- Left to right: Karagöl, Çubuk City Museum, Esenboğa Airport, aerial view of the district, Çubuk-2 Dam and Çubuk turşusu

- Logo

- Map showing Çubuk District in Ankara Province

- Location within Turkey Location within Turkey Central Anatolia
- Coordinates: 40°14′19″N 33°01′59″E
- Country: Turkey
- Province: Ankara

Government
  - Mayor: Baki Demirbaş (AKP)
- Area: 1,198 km^{2} (463 sq mi)
- Elevation: 1,000 m (3,300 ft)
- Population (2022): 95,449
  - Density: 79.67/km^{2} (206.4/sq mi)
- Time zone: UTC+3 (TRT)
- Postal code: 06760
- Area code: 0312
- Website: www.cubuk.bel.tr

Çubuk is a municipality and district of Ankara Province, Turkey. Its area is 1,198 km^{2}, and its population is 95,449 (2022). Çubuk is in a flat plain 35 km north of the city of Ankara, where Ankara airport is located. Its elevation is 1,000 m (3,281 ft).

== Origin ==
Çubuk was among the first places that were captured during the conquest of Anatolia by the Seljuk Turks. The district is said to be named after Çubuk Bey, the Seljuk commander that captured the region. Kışlacık, Yeşilkent, Yaylak, Okçular, Çatköy, and Ahurlar are places located in Çubuk and used by Yıldırım Bayezid during the 1402 Battle of Ankara which was fought between the Ottoman Empire and Timur.

== History ==
Çubuk is a settlement that was established when the Turks conquered and took control of Anatolia. The district is located in the northeast of Ankara. Çubuk gained historical importance when Bayezid I used Çubuk in the Battle of Ankara which was fought between Timur and the Ottoman Empire. Most of the villages that make up the district were formed by the remnants of armies defeated or left behind after the major battle.

Çubuk is in an area that has been crossed by trade routes since the Middle Ages. Many settlements were founded in this region because of the agricultural areas and the Çubuk River. The settlement is thought to have been founded after the conquest of Ankara and was under the control of many civilizations, for example the Hattians, Hittites, Phrygians, Romans, Byzantines, Seljuks, Timurids and Ottomans. This is why the remains of these empires can be found in the district. Ruins in the Balıkhisar Neighborhood, castle ruins in Camili and Çatkoy, a marble lion sculpture in the Güldarpı neighborhood and remains of graves in the Yakup Derviş neighborhood are among the remains of these empires. Also, the Sultan Siyemi Tomb, Kutoren Village Mosque, Melikshah Village Stone Bath, Mahmutoglan Village Mosque, and Cubuk Karsiyaka Mosque are among the historical monuments located in Çubuk.

It is believed that the Turks settled in the region after they conquered and took control of Anatolia. The Turks who came to the region brought their families, traditions, customs, and beliefs.

== Demographics ==
Historical population
Year	Pop.	±% p.a.
2007	83,826	—
2012	82,614	−0.29%
2017	90,063	+1.74%
2022	95,449	+1.17%
Source: TÜIK (2007-2022)

== Composition ==
There are 84 neighbourhoods in Çubuk District:

- Ağılcık
- Akbayır
- Akkuzulu
- Aşağıçavundur
- Aşağıemirler
- Aşağıobruk
- Atatürk
- Avcıova
- Barbaros
- Camili
- Çatköy
- Çitköy
- Cumhuriyet
- Dağkalafat
- Dalyasan
- Dedeler
- Demirci
- Dumlupınar
- Durhasan
- Eğriekin
- Esenboğa
- Eskiçöte
- Fatih
- Gökçedere
- Güldarpı
- Gümüşyayla
- Hacılar
- İkipınar
- İmamhüseyin
- Kapaklı
- Karaağaç
- Karaçam
- Karadana
- Karaman
- Karataş
- Kargın
- Kavaklı
- Kışlacık
- Kızılca
- Kızılören
- Kızılöz
- Kösrelik
- Küçükali
- Kuruçay
- Kutuören
- Kuyumcu
- Mahmutoğlan
- Melikşah
- Meşeli
- Muhsin Yazıcıoğlu
- Mutlu
- Nusratlar
- Okçular
- Ömercik
- Ovacık
- Oyumiğde
- Özlüce
- Saraycık
- Sarıkoz
- Sarısu
- Sele
- Sığırlıhacı
- Sünlü
- Susuz
- Tahtayazı
- Taşpınar
- Tuğla
- Uluağaç
- Yakuphasan
- Yavuzselim
- Yaylak
- Yazır
- Yazlıca
- Yenice
- Yeşilkent
- Yiğitli
- Yıldırımaydoğan
- Yıldırımbeyazıt
- Yıldırımelören
- Yıldırımevci
- Yılmazköy
- Yukarı Çavundur
- Yukarıemirler
- Yukarıobruk

== Places of interest ==
- Karagöl rocks, picnic area
