= Kırca, Bigadiç =

Village in Turkey

Kırca
- Neighbourhood
- Location in Turkey Kırca (Marmara)
- Coordinates: 39.439°N 28.328°E
- Country: Turkey
- Province: Balıkesir
- District: Bigadiç
- Population (2022): 230
- Time zone: UTC+3 (TRT)

Kırca is a neighbourhood in the municipality and district of Bigadiç, Balıkesir Province in Turkey. It has a population of 230 (2022).
