= Elyapan, Bigadiç =

Village in Turkey

Elyapan
- Neighbourhood
- Location in Turkey Elyapan (Marmara)
- Coordinates: 39°26′13″N 28°00′07″E
- Country: Turkey
- Province: Balıkesir
- District: Bigadiç
- Population (2022): 593
- Time zone: UTC+3 (TRT)

Elyapan is a neighbourhood in the municipality and district of Bigadiç, Balıkesir Province in Turkey. Its population is 593 (2022).
