= Kadıköy, Bigadiç =

Village in Turkey

Kadıköy
- Neighbourhood
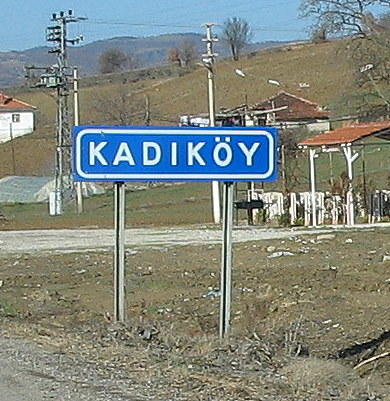

- Location within Turkey Location within Marmara
- Coordinates: 39.452°N 28.087°E
- Country: Turkey
- Province: Balıkesir
- District: Bigadiç
- Population (2022): 326
- Time zone: UTC+3 (TRT)

Kadıköy is a neighbourhood in the municipality and district of Bigadiç, Balıkesir Province in Turkey. Its population is 326 (2022).
