= Sarıkoz, Çubuk =

Sarıkoz
- Neighbourhood
- Location in Turkey Sarıkoz (Turkey Central Anatolia)
- Coordinates: 40°20′N 33°00′E
- Country: Turkey
- Province: Ankara
- District: Çubuk
- Population (2022): 46
- Time zone: UTC+3 (TRT)

Sarıkoz is a neighbourhood in the municipality and district of Çubuk, Ankara Province, Turkey. Its population is 46 (2022).
