= Yolbaşı, Bigadiç =

Village in Turkey

Yolbaşı
- Neighbourhood
- Location in Turkey Yolbaşı (Marmara)
- Coordinates: 39.486°N 28.223°E
- Country: Turkey
- Province: Balıkesir
- District: Bigadiç
- Population (2022): 171
- Time zone: UTC+3 (TRT)

Yolbaşı is a neighbourhood in the municipality and district of Bigadiç, Balıkesir Province in Turkey. Its population is 171 (2022).
