= Tahtayazı, Çubuk =

Tahtayazı
- Neighbourhood
- Location in Turkey Tahtayazı (Turkey Central Anatolia)
- Coordinates: 40°18′N 33°03′E
- Country: Turkey
- Province: Ankara
- District: Çubuk
- Population (2022): 296
- Time zone: UTC+3 (TRT)

Tahtayazı is a neighbourhood in the municipality and district of Çubuk, Ankara Province, Turkey. Its population is 296 (2022).
