= Yenice, Çubuk =

Yenice
- Neighbourhood
- Location in Turkey Yenice (Turkey Central Anatolia)
- Coordinates: 40.1150°N 32.9782°E
- Country: Turkey
- Province: Ankara
- District: Çubuk
- Population (2022): 920
- Time zone: UTC+3 (TRT)

Yenice is a neighbourhood in the municipality and district of Çubuk, Ankara Province, Turkey. Its population is 920 (2022).
