= Yazlıca, Çubuk =

Yazlıca
- Neighbourhood
- Location in Turkey Yazlıca (Turkey Central Anatolia)
- Coordinates: 40.3253°N 33.0203°E
- Country: Turkey
- Province: Ankara
- District: Çubuk
- Population (2022): 14
- Time zone: UTC+3 (TRT)

Yazlıca is a neighbourhood in the municipality and district of Çubuk, Ankara Province, Turkey. Its population is 14 (2022).
