= Çayköy, Göynük =

Çayköy
- Village
- Location within Turkey
- Coordinates: 40.2612°N 30.7614°E
- Country: Turkey
- Province: Bolu
- District: Göynük
- Population (2021): 143
- Time zone: UTC+3 (TRT)

Çayköy is a village in the Göynük District, Bolu Province, Turkey. Its population is 143 (2021).
