= Kaşıkçışeyhler, Göynük =

Kaşıkçışeyhler
- Village
- Location within Turkey
- Coordinates: 40°28′N 30°41′E
- Country: Turkey
- Province: Bolu
- District: Göynük
- Population (2021): 124
- Time zone: UTC+3 (TRT)

Kaşıkçışeyhler is a village in the Göynük District, Bolu Province, Turkey. Its population in 2021 was 24. (2021).

== The Kaşıkçışeyhler tomb ==
Ahmed Yesevi was a Sufi who was born in Sayram Town, located near the city of Shymkent in today's Kazakhstan. After completing his religious education, he settled in the city of Yesi (today known as Turkestan) in that region, and died there after many years of providing the people of the district with spiritual guidance. He sent some of his students to Anatolia: one of them came to Kaşıkçışeyhler, where he continued his studies and also taught spoon making to the people in the surrounding area. He and his wife were buried in the village. The village people built a tomb for them in the 1100s which has been maintained over the following centuries.
