= Bulanık, Göynük =

Bulanık
- Village
- Location within Turkey
- Coordinates: 40.4401°N 30.7659°E
- Country: Turkey
- Province: Bolu
- District: Göynük
- Population (2021): 175
- Time zone: UTC+3 (TRT)

Bulanık is a village in the Göynük District, Bolu Province, Turkey. Its population is 175 (2021).
