= Mutlu, Çubuk =

Mutlu
- Neighbourhood
- Location in Turkey Mutlu (Turkey Central Anatolia)
- Coordinates: 40.2593°N 33.1107°E
- Country: Turkey
- Province: Ankara
- District: Çubuk
- Population (2022): 92
- Time zone: UTC+3 (TRT)

Mutlu is a neighbourhood in the municipality and district of Çubuk, Ankara Province, Turkey. Its population is 92 (2022).
