= Kayabaşı, Göynük =

Kayabaşı
- Village
- Location within Turkey
- Coordinates: 40.2554°N 30.7181°E
- Country: Turkey
- Province: Bolu
- District: Göynük
- Population (2021): 98
- Time zone: UTC+3 (TRT)

Kayabaşı is a village in the Göynük District, Bolu Province, Turkey. Its population is 98 (2021).
