= Okçular, Çubuk =

Okçular
- Neighbourhood
- Location in Turkey Okçular (Turkey Central Anatolia)
- Coordinates: 40.3801°N 33.0392°E
- Country: Turkey
- Province: Ankara
- District: Çubuk
- Population (2022): 52
- Time zone: UTC+3 (TRT)

Okçular is a neighbourhood in the municipality and district of Çubuk, Ankara Province, Turkey. Its population is 52 (2022).
