= Yeniköy, Bigadiç =

Village in Turkey

Yeniköy
- Neighbourhood
- Location in Turkey Yeniköy (Marmara)
- Coordinates: 39.524°N 28.129°E
- Country: Turkey
- Province: Balıkesir
- District: Bigadiç
- Population (2022): 363
- Time zone: UTC+3 (TRT)

Yeniköy is a neighbourhood in the municipality and district of Bigadiç, Balıkesir Province in Turkey. Its population is 363 (2022).
