= Kuyupınar, Göynük =

Kuyupınar
- Village
- Location within Turkey
- Coordinates: 40.2393°N 30.7279°E
- Country: Turkey
- Province: Bolu
- District: Göynük
- Population (2021): 199
- Time zone: UTC+3 (TRT)

Kuyupınar is a village in the Göynük District, Bolu Province, Turkey. Its population is 199 (2021).
