= Emirler, Bigadiç =

Village in Bigadiç, Balıkesir Province

Emirler
- Neighbourhood
- Location in Turkey Emirler (Marmara)
- Coordinates: 39°27′38″N 28°13′32″E
- Country: Turkey
- Province: Balıkesir
- District: Bigadiç
- Population (2022): 504
- Time zone: UTC+3 (TRT)

Emirler is a neighbourhood in the municipality and district of Bigadiç, Balıkesir Province in Turkey. Its population is 504 (2022).
