= Dumlupınar, Çubuk =

Dumlupınar
- Neighbourhood
- Location in Turkey Dumlupınar (Turkey Central Anatolia)
- Coordinates: 40.1230°N 32.9435°E
- Country: Turkey
- Province: Ankara
- District: Çubuk
- Population (2022): 4,518
- Time zone: UTC+3 (TRT)

Dumlupınar is a neighbourhood in the municipality and district of Çubuk, Ankara Province, Turkey. Its population is 4,518 (2022).
