= Dedeçınar, Bigadiç =

Village in Turkey

Dedeçınar
- Neighbourhood
- Location in Turkey Dedeçınar (Marmara)
- Coordinates: 39.448°N 28.050°E
- Country: Turkey
- Province: Balıkesir
- District: Bigadiç
- Population (2022): 274
- Time zone: UTC+3 (TRT)

Dedeçınar is a neighbourhood in the municipality and district of Bigadiç, Balıkesir Province in Turkey. Its population is 274 (2022).
