= Güldarpı, Çubuk =

Güldarpı
- Neighbourhood
- Location in Turkey Güldarpı (Turkey Central Anatolia)
- Coordinates: 40°09′N 33°01′E
- Country: Turkey
- Province: Ankara
- District: Çubuk
- Population (2022): 647
- Time zone: UTC+3 (TRT)

Güldarpı is a neighbourhood in the municipality and district of Çubuk, Ankara Province, Turkey. Its population is 647 (2022).
