= Yahyaköy, Susurluk =

Town in Turkey

Yahyaköy
- Neighbourhood
- Location in Turkey Yahyaköy (Marmara)
- Coordinates: 39°59′49″N 28°10′37″E
- Country: Turkey
- Province: Balıkesir
- District: Susurluk
- Population (2022): 192
- Time zone: UTC+3 (TRT)

Yahyaköy is a neighbourhood in the municipality and district of Susurluk, Balıkesir Province in Turkey. Its population is 192 (2022). It is 9 km north of the town of Susurluk.

== History ==
The village was the site of a battle in the Revolt of Ahmet Anzavur.

== Population ==
The village residents are mainly Circassians and Bulgarian immigrants (refugees).

Historical population
Year	Pop.	±% p.a.
1997	448	—
2007	288	−4.32%
2012	262	−1.87%
2017	217	−3.70%
2022	192	−2.42%
Source: 1997 census and TÜIK (2007-2022)

== Services ==
The town has a defunct railway station.

The climate is semi-Mediterranean climate. The town is mainly affected by the Sea of Marmara, but being inland, a more continental climate is effective. So winters cold and snowy.
