= Odalıdam, Susurluk =

Village in Turkey

Odalıdam
- Neighbourhood
- Location in Turkey Odalıdam (Marmara)
- Coordinates: 39°50′N 28°00′E
- Country: Turkey
- Province: Balıkesir
- District: Susurluk
- Population (2022): 55
- Time zone: UTC+3 (TRT)

Odalıdam is a neighbourhood in the municipality and district of Susurluk, Balıkesir Province in Turkey. Its population is 55 (2022).
