= Yıldırımevci, Çubuk =

Yıldırımevci
- Neighbourhood
- Country: Turkey
- Province: Ankara
- District: Çubuk
- Population (2022): 62
- Time zone: UTC+3 (TRT)

Yıldırımevci is a neighbourhood in the municipality and district of Çubuk, Ankara Province, Turkey. Its population is 62 (2022).
