= Hamidiye, Bigadiç =

Village in Turkey

Hamidiye
- Neighbourhood
- Location in Turkey Hamidiye (Marmara)
- Coordinates: 39.373°N 27.996°E
- Country: Turkey
- Province: Balıkesir
- District: Bigadiç
- Population (2022): 679
- Time zone: UTC+3 (TRT)

Hamidiye is a neighbourhood in the municipality and district of Bigadiç, Balıkesir Province in Turkey. Its population is 679 (2022).
