= Kürnüç, Göynük =

Kürnüç
- Village
- Location within Turkey
- Country: Turkey
- Province: Bolu
- District: Göynük
- Population (2021): 37
- Time zone: UTC+3 (TRT)

Kürnüç is a village in the Göynük District, Bolu Province, Turkey. Its population is 37 (2021).
