= Çekirdekli, Bigadiç =

Village in Turkey

Çekirdekli
- Neighbourhood
- Location in Turkey Çekirdekli (Marmara)
- Coordinates: 39°22′54″N 28°02′29″E
- Country: Turkey
- Province: Balıkesir
- District: Bigadiç
- Population (2022): 681
- Time zone: UTC+3 (TRT)

Çekirdekli is a neighbourhood in the municipality and district of Bigadiç, Balıkesir Province in Turkey. Its population is 681 (2022).
