= Başçeşme, Bigadiç =

Village in Turkey

Başçeşme
- Neighbourhood
- Location in Turkey Başçeşme (Marmara)
- Coordinates: 39.487°N 27.972°E
- Country: Turkey
- Province: Balıkesir
- District: Bigadiç
- Population (2022): 264
- Time zone: UTC+3 (TRT)

Başçeşme is a neighbourhood in the municipality and district of Bigadiç, Balıkesir Province in Turkey. Its population is 264 (2022).
