= Sarılar, Göynük =

Sarılar
- Village
- Location within Turkey
- Coordinates: 40.1940°N 30.7273°E
- Country: Turkey
- Province: Bolu
- District: Göynük
- Population (2021): 235
- Time zone: UTC+3 (TRT)

Sarılar is a village in the Göynük District, Bolu Province, Turkey. Its population is 235 (2021).
