= Kavaklı, Çubuk =

Kavaklı
- Neighbourhood
- Location in Turkey Kavaklı (Turkey Central Anatolia)
- Coordinates: 40.2797°N 32.8803°E
- Country: Turkey
- Province: Ankara
- District: Çubuk
- Population (2022): 62
- Time zone: UTC+3 (TRT)

Kavaklı is a neighbourhood in the municipality and district of Çubuk, Ankara Province, Turkey. Its population is 62 (2022).
