= Karaman, Çubuk =

Karaman
- Neighbourhood
- Location in Turkey Karaman (Turkey Central Anatolia)
- Coordinates: 40.3042°N 33.0047°E
- Country: Turkey
- Province: Ankara
- District: Çubuk
- Population (2022): 29
- Time zone: UTC+3 (TRT)

Karaman is a neighbourhood in the municipality and district of Çubuk, Ankara Province, Turkey. Its population is 29 (2022).
