= Dikkonak, Bigadiç =

Village in Turkey

Dikkonak
- Neighbourhood
- Location in Turkey Dikkonak (Marmara)
- Coordinates: 39°25′51″N 27°58′41″E
- Country: Turkey
- Province: Balıkesir
- District: Bigadiç
- Population (2022): 125
- Time zone: UTC+3 (TRT)

Dikkonak is a neighbourhood in the municipality and district of Bigadiç, Balıkesir Province in Turkey. Its population is 125 (2022).
