= Tozağan, Bigadiç =

Village in Turkey

Tozağan
- Neighbourhood
- Location in Turkey Tozağan (Marmara)
- Coordinates: 39°26′39″N 28°22′07″E
- Country: Turkey
- Province: Balıkesir
- District: Bigadiç
- Population (2022): 55
- Time zone: UTC+3 (TRT)

Tozağan is a neighbourhood in the municipality and district of Bigadiç, Balıkesir Province in Turkey. Its population is 55 (2022).
