= Yeniköy, Göynük =

Yeniköy
- Village
- Location within Turkey
- Coordinates: 40°19′42″N 30°55′48″E
- Country: Turkey
- Province: Bolu
- District: Göynük
- Population (2021): 231
- Time zone: UTC+3 (TRT)

Yeniköy is a village in the Göynük District, Bolu Province, Turkey. Its population is 231 (2021).
