= Yiğitli, Çubuk =

Yiğitli
- Neighbourhood
- Location in Turkey Yiğitli (Turkey Central Anatolia)
- Coordinates: 40.2669°N 32.9056°E
- Country: Turkey
- Province: Ankara
- District: Çubuk
- Population (2022): 73
- Time zone: UTC+3 (TRT)

Yiğitli is a neighbourhood in the municipality and district of Çubuk, Ankara Province, Turkey. Its population is 73 (2022).
