= Pelitcik, Göynük =

Pelitcik
- Village
- Location within Turkey
- Coordinates: 40.1755°N 30.6499°E
- Country: Turkey
- Province: Bolu
- District: Göynük
- Population (2021): 43
- Time zone: UTC+3 (TRT)

Pelitcik is a village in the Göynük District, Bolu Province, Turkey. Its population is 43 (2021).
