= Dağhacılar, Göynük =

Dağhacılar
- Village
- Location within Turkey
- Coordinates: 40°16′N 30°58′E
- Country: Turkey
- Province: Bolu
- District: Göynük
- Population (2021): 86
- Time zone: UTC+3 (TRT)

Dağhacılar is a village in the Göynük District, Bolu Province, Turkey. Its population is 86 (2021).
