= Kuyumcu, Çubuk =

Kuyumcu
- Neighbourhood
- Location in Turkey Kuyumcu (Turkey Central Anatolia)
- Coordinates: 40°20′N 33°09′E
- Country: Turkey
- Province: Ankara
- District: Çubuk
- Population (2022): 66
- Time zone: UTC+3 (TRT)

Kuyumcu is a neighbourhood in the municipality and district of Çubuk, Ankara Province, Turkey. Its population is 66 (2022).
