= Çıtak, Bigadiç =

Village in Turkey

Çıtak
- Neighbourhood
- Location in Turkey Çıtak (Marmara)
- Coordinates: 39.330°N 28.551°E
- Country: Turkey
- Province: Balıkesir
- District: Bigadiç
- Population (2022): 56
- Time zone: UTC+3 (TRT)

Çıtak is a neighbourhood in the municipality and district of Bigadiç, Balıkesir Province in Turkey. Its population is 56 (2022).
