= Çayüstü, Bigadiç =

Village in Turkey

Çayüstü
- Neighbourhood
- Location in Turkey Çayüstü (Marmara)
- Coordinates: 39.393°N 27.978°E
- Country: Turkey
- Province: Balıkesir
- District: Bigadiç
- Population (2022): 382
- Time zone: UTC+3 (TRT)

Çayüstü is a neighbourhood in the municipality and district of Bigadiç, Balıkesir Province in Turkey. Its population is 382 (2022).
