= Yıldırımaydoğan, Çubuk =

Yıldırımaydoğan
- Neighbourhood
- Location in Turkey Yıldırımaydoğan (Turkey Central Anatolia)
- Coordinates: 40°28′N 32°54′E
- Country: Turkey
- Province: Ankara
- District: Çubuk
- Population (2022): 47
- Time zone: UTC+3 (TRT)

Yıldırımaydoğan is a neighbourhood in the municipality and district of Çubuk, Ankara Province, Turkey. Its population is 47 (2022).
