= Karaardıç, Göynük =

Karaardıç
- Village
- Location within Turkey
- Coordinates: 40.3076°N 30.8457°E
- Country: Turkey
- Province: Bolu
- District: Göynük
- Population (2021): 283
- Time zone: UTC+3 (TRT)

Karaardıç is a village in the Göynük District, Bolu Province, Turkey. Its population is 283 (2021).
