= Yeşilkent, Çubuk =

Turkish neighbourhood

Yeşilkent
- Neighbourhood
- Location in Turkey Yeşilkent (Turkey Central Anatolia)
- Coordinates: 40.4237°N 32.9405°E
- Country: Turkey
- Province: Ankara
- District: Çubuk
- Population (2022): 78
- Time zone: UTC+3 (TRT)

Yeşilkent is a neighbourhood in the municipality and district of Çubuk, Ankara Province, Turkey. Its population is 78 (2022).

== Geography ==
It is 70 km away from Ankara city center and 27 km away from Çubuk district.

== Population ==
Neighbourhood population data by years
2007	
2000	243
1997	177
