= Meşeli, Çubuk =

Meşeli
- Neighbourhood
- Location in Turkey Meşeli (Turkey Central Anatolia)
- Coordinates: 40.3598°N 33.2077°E
- Country: Turkey
- Province: Ankara
- District: Çubuk
- Population (2022): 138
- Time zone: UTC+3 (TRT)

Meşeli is a neighbourhood in the municipality and district of Çubuk, Ankara Province, Turkey. Its population is 138 (2022).
