= Duman, Susurluk =

Village in Turkey

Duman
- Neighbourhood
- Country: Turkey
- Province: Balıkesir
- District: Susurluk
- Population (2022): 54
- Time zone: UTC+3 (TRT)

Duman (also: Dumanköy) is a neighbourhood in the municipality and district of Susurluk, Balıkesir Province in Turkey. Its population is 54 (2022).
