= Küçükali, Çubuk =

Küçükali
- Neighbourhood
- Location in Turkey Küçükali (Turkey Central Anatolia)
- Coordinates: 40°12′N 33°13′E
- Country: Turkey
- Province: Ankara
- District: Çubuk
- Population (2022): 78
- Time zone: UTC+3 (TRT)

Küçükali is a neighbourhood in the municipality and district of Çubuk, Ankara Province, Turkey. Its population is 78 (2022).
