= Kapaklı, Çubuk =

Kapaklı
- Neighbourhood
- Location in Turkey Kapaklı (Turkey Central Anatolia)
- Coordinates: 40.2203°N 33.1678°E
- Country: Turkey
- Province: Ankara
- District: Çubuk
- Population (2022): 149
- Time zone: UTC+3 (TRT)

Kapaklı is a neighbourhood in the municipality and district of Çubuk, Ankara Province, Turkey. Its population is 149 (2022).
