= Ömerköy, Susurluk =

Village in Turkey

Ömerköy
- Neighbourhood
- Country: Turkey
- Province: Balıkesir
- District: Susurluk
- Population (2022): 253
- Time zone: UTC+3 (TRT)

Ömerköy is a neighbourhood in the municipality and district of Susurluk, Balıkesir Province in Turkey. Its population is 253 (2022).

== Geography ==
It is 31 km away from Balıkesir city center and 17 km away from Susurluk district.
