= Adalı, Bigadiç =

Village in Turkey

Adalı
- Neighbourhood
- Location in Turkey Adalı (Marmara)
- Coordinates: 39.411°N 28.286°E
- Country: Turkey
- Province: Balıkesir
- District: Bigadiç
- Population (2022): 476
- Time zone: UTC+3 (TRT)

Adalı is a neighbourhood in the municipality and district of Bigadiç, Balıkesir Province in Turkey. Its population is 476 (2022).
