= Balıklıdere, Susurluk =

Village in Turkey

Balıklıdere
- Neighbourhood
- Location in Turkey Balıklıdere (Marmara)
- Coordinates: 39.9561°N 28.1582°E
- Country: Turkey
- Province: Balıkesir
- District: Susurluk
- Population (2022): 305
- Time zone: UTC+3 (TRT)

Balıklıdere is a neighbourhood in the municipality and district of Susurluk, Balıkesir Province in Turkey. Its population is 305 (2022).
