= İmamhüseyin, Çubuk =

İmamhüseyin
- Neighbourhood
- Location in Turkey İmamhüseyin (Turkey Central Anatolia)
- Coordinates: 40°12′N 33°12′E
- Country: Turkey
- Province: Ankara
- District: Çubuk
- Population (2022): 69
- Time zone: UTC+3 (TRT)

İmamhüseyin is a neighbourhood in the municipality and district of Çubuk, Ankara Province, Turkey. Its population is 69 (2022).
