= Alibey, Susurluk =

Village in Turkey

Alibey
- Neighbourhood
- Location in Turkey Alibey (Marmara)
- Coordinates: 39.8697°N 28.0477°E
- Country: Turkey
- Province: Balıkesir
- District: Susurluk
- Population (2022): 122
- Time zone: UTC+3 (TRT)

Alibey is a neighbourhood in the municipality and district of Susurluk, Balıkesir Province in Turkey. Its population is 122 (2022).
