= Okçularyeri, Bigadiç =

Village in Turkey

Okçularyeri
- Neighbourhood
- Location in Turkey Okçularyeri (Marmara)
- Coordinates: 39°22′14″N 28°25′21″E
- Country: Turkey
- Province: Balıkesir
- District: Bigadiç
- Population (2022): 118
- Time zone: UTC+3 (TRT)

Okçularyeri is a neighbourhood in the municipality and district of Bigadiç, Balıkesir Province in Turkey. Its population is 118 (2022).
