= Yukarıobruk, Çubuk =

Yukarıobruk
- Neighbourhood
- Location in Turkey Yukarıobruk (Turkey Central Anatolia)
- Coordinates: 40°16′N 32°57′E
- Country: Turkey
- Province: Ankara
- District: Çubuk
- Population (2022): 33
- Time zone: UTC+3 (TRT)

Yukarıobruk is a neighbourhood in the municipality and district of Çubuk, Ankara Province, Turkey. Its population is 33 (2022).
