= Ahmetbeyler, Göynük =

Ahmetbeyler
- Village
- Location within Turkey
- Coordinates: 40.2352°N 30.8442°E
- Country: Turkey
- Province: Bolu
- District: Göynük
- Population (2021): 218
- Time zone: UTC+3 (TRT)

Ahmetbeyler is a village in the Göynük District, Bolu Province, Turkey. Its population is 218 (2021).
