= Esenli, Bigadiç =

Village in Turkey

Esenli
- Neighbourhood
- Location in Turkey Esenli (Marmara)
- Coordinates: 39.545°N 28.052°E
- Country: Turkey
- Province: Balıkesir
- District: Bigadiç
- Population (2022): 480
- Time zone: UTC+3 (TRT)

Esenli is a neighbourhood in the municipality and district of Bigadiç, Balıkesir Province in Turkey. Its population is 480 (2022).
