= Küçükyeniköy, Bigadiç =

Village in Turkey

Küçükyeniköy
- Neighbourhood
- Location in Turkey Küçükyeniköy (Marmara)
- Coordinates: 39°27′37″N 27°58′32″E
- Country: Turkey
- Province: Balıkesir
- District: Bigadiç
- Population (2022): 218
- Time zone: UTC+3 (TRT)

Küçükyeniköy is a neighbourhood in the municipality and district of Bigadiç, Balıkesir Province in Turkey. Its population is 218 (2022).
