= Karabahçe, Bigadiç =

Village in Turkey

Karabahçe
- Neighbourhood
- Location in Turkey Karabahçe (Marmara)
- Coordinates: 39.375°N 28.465°E
- Country: Turkey
- Province: Balıkesir
- District: Bigadiç
- Population (2022): 26
- Time zone: UTC+3 (TRT)

Karabahçe is a neighbourhood in the municipality and district of Bigadiç, Balıkesir Province in Turkey. Its population is 26 (2022).
