= Bademli, Bigadiç =

Village in Turkey

Bademli
- Neighbourhood
- Location in Turkey Bademli (Marmara)
- Coordinates: 39.428°N 28.071°E
- Country: Turkey
- Province: Balıkesir
- District: Bigadiç
- Population (2022): 423
- Time zone: UTC+3 (TRT)

Bademli is a neighbourhood in the municipality and district of Bigadiç, Balıkesir Province in Turkey. Its population is 423 (2022).

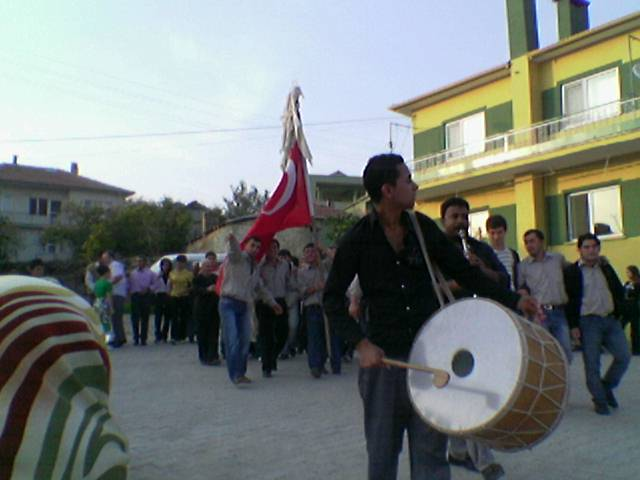
wedding, Bademli
