= Çamlıca, Göynük =

Çamlıca
- Village
- Location in Turkey
- Coordinates: 40.3986°N 30.8357°E
- Country: Turkey
- Province: Bolu
- District: Göynük
- Population (2021): 149
- Time zone: UTC+3 (TRT)

Çamlıca is a village in the Göynük District, Bolu Province, Turkey. Its population is 149 (2021).
