= Yukarıgöçek, Bigadiç =

Village in Turkey

Yukarıgöçek
- Neighbourhood
- Location in Turkey Yukarıgöçek (Marmara)
- Coordinates: 39°23′52″N 28°27′32″E
- Country: Turkey
- Province: Balıkesir
- District: Bigadiç
- Population (2022): 202
- Time zone: UTC+3 (TRT)

Yukarıgöçek is a neighbourhood in the municipality and district of Bigadiç, Balıkesir Province in Turkey. Its population is 202 (2022).
