= Çubukköy, Göynük =

Çubukköy
- Village
- Location within Turkey
- Coordinates: 40°28′N 30°50′E
- Country: Turkey
- Province: Bolu
- District: Göynük
- Population (2021): 159
- Time zone: UTC+3 (TRT)

Çubukköy is a village in the Göynük District, Bolu Province, Turkey. Its population is 159 (2021).
