= Soğukçam, Göynük =

Soğukçam
- Village
- Location within Turkey
- Coordinates: 40.1704°N 30.8277°E
- Country: Turkey
- Province: Bolu
- District: Göynük
- Population (2021): 26
- Time zone: UTC+3 (TRT)

Soğukçam (formerly: Germenos) is a village in the Göynük District, Bolu Province, Turkey. Its population is 26 (2021). The oldest Phrygian script was found in this village.
