= Aziziye, Susurluk =

Village in Turkey

Aziziye
- Neighbourhood
- Location in Turkey Aziziye (Marmara)
- Coordinates: 39.8550°N 28.1614°E
- Country: Turkey
- Province: Balıkesir
- District: Susurluk
- Population (2022): 150
- Time zone: UTC+3 (TRT)

Aziziye is a neighbourhood in the municipality and district of Susurluk, Balıkesir Province in Turkey. Its population is 150 (2022).
