= Bozbük, Bigadiç =

Village in Turkey

Bozbük
- Neighbourhood
- Location in Turkey Bozbük (Marmara)
- Coordinates: 39.344°N 28.553°E
- Country: Turkey
- Province: Balıkesir
- District: Bigadiç
- Population (2022): 163
- Time zone: UTC+3 (TRT)

Bozbük is a neighbourhood in the municipality and district of Bigadiç, Balıkesir Province in Turkey. Its population is 163 (2022).
