= Kızılçukur, Bigadiç =

Village in Turkey

Kızılçukur
- Neighbourhood
- Location in Turkey Kızılçukur (Marmara)
- Coordinates: 39.379°N 28.389°E
- Country: Turkey
- Province: Balıkesir
- District: Bigadiç
- Population (2022): 297
- Time zone: UTC+3 (TRT)

Kızılçukur is a neighbourhood in the municipality and district of Bigadiç, Balıkesir Province in Turkey. Its population is 297 (2022).
