= Gökçeağaç, Susurluk =

Village in Turkey

Gökçeağaç
- Neighbourhood
- Location in Turkey Gökçeağaç (Marmara)
- Coordinates: 39.790°N 28.216°E
- Country: Turkey
- Province: Balıkesir
- District: Susurluk
- Population (2022): 230
- Time zone: UTC+3 (TRT)

Gökçeağaç is a neighbourhood in the municipality and district of Susurluk, Balıkesir Province in Turkey. Its population is 230 (2022).
