= Camili, Çubuk =

Camili
- Neighbourhood
- Location in Turkey Camili (Turkey Central Anatolia)
- Coordinates: 40.3002°N 33.1927°E
- Country: Turkey
- Province: Ankara
- District: Çubuk
- Population (2022): 157
- Time zone: UTC+3 (TRT)

Camili is a neighbourhood in the municipality and district of Çubuk, Ankara Province, Turkey. Its population is 157 (2022).
