= Davutlar, Bigadiç =

Village in Turkey

Davutlar
- Neighbourhood
- Location in Turkey Davutlar (Marmara)
- Coordinates: 39.491°N 28.322°E
- Country: Turkey
- Province: Balıkesir
- District: Bigadiç
- Population (2022): 338
- Time zone: UTC+3 (TRT)

Davutlar is a neighbourhood in the municipality and district of Bigadiç, Balıkesir Province in Turkey. Its population is 338 (2022).
