= Yılmazköy, Çubuk =

Yılmazköy
- Neighbourhood
- Location in Turkey Yılmazköy (Turkey Central Anatolia)
- Coordinates: 40.2476°N 32.8826°E
- Country: Turkey
- Province: Ankara
- District: Çubuk
- Population (2022): 105
- Time zone: UTC+3 (TRT)

Yılmazköy is a neighbourhood in the municipality and district of Çubuk, Ankara Province, Turkey. Its population is 105 (2022).
