= Bozen, Susurluk =

Village in Turkey

Bozen
- Neighbourhood
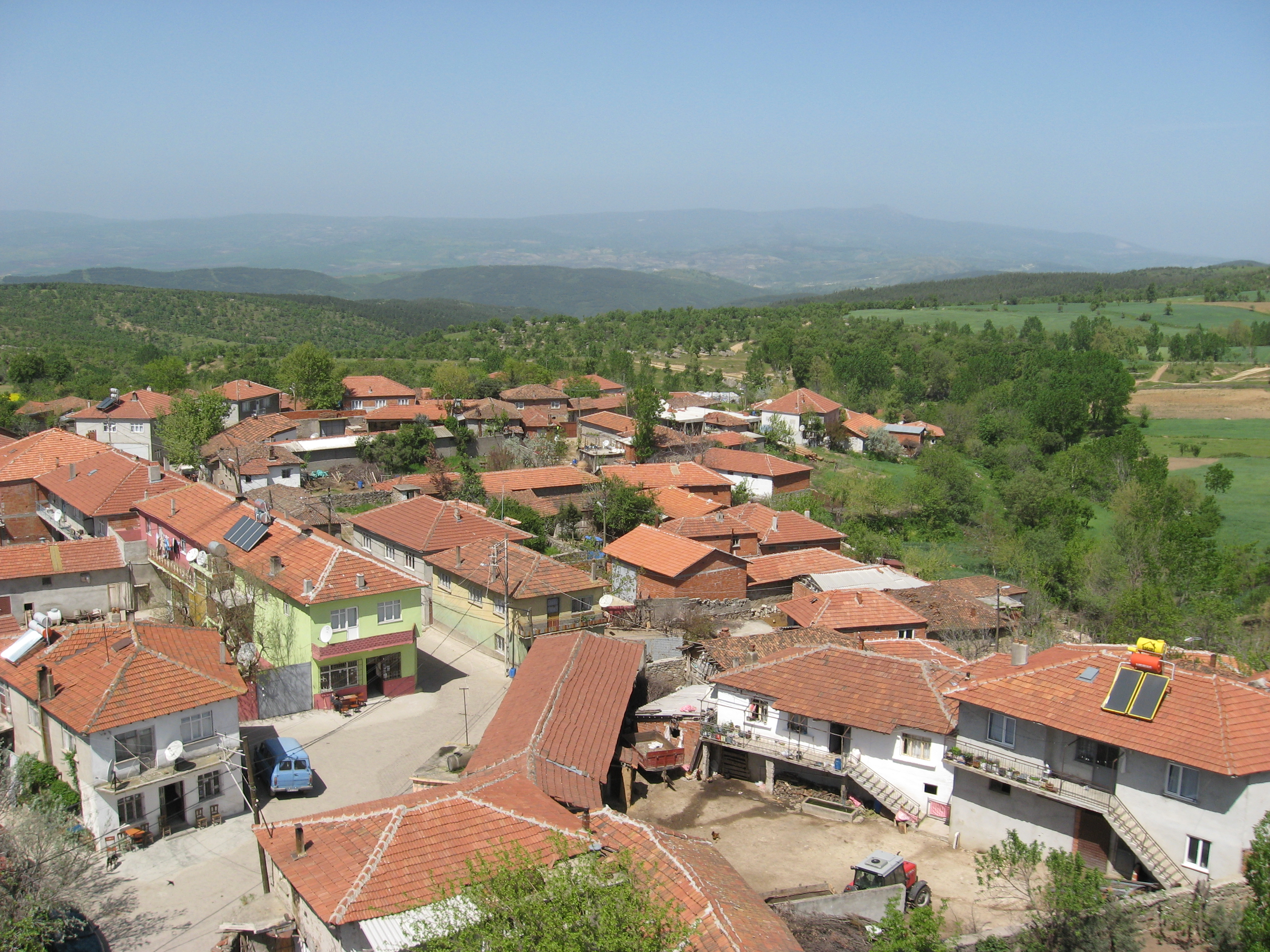

- Location within Turkey Location within Marmara
- Coordinates: 39.8156°N 28.2290°E
- Country: Turkey
- Province: Balıkesir
- District: Susurluk
- Population (2022): 376
- Time zone: UTC+3 (TRT)

Bozen is a neighbourhood in the municipality and district of Susurluk, Balıkesir Province in Turkey. Its population is 376 (2022).
