= Dedeler, Göynük =

Dedeler
- Village
- Location within Turkey
- Coordinates: 40.3142°N 30.8978°E
- Country: Turkey
- Province: Bolu
- District: Göynük
- Population (2021): 413
- Time zone: UTC+3 (TRT)

Dedeler is a village in the Göynük District, Bolu Province, Turkey. Its population is 413 (2021).
