= Kışlacık, Çubuk =

Kışlacık
- Neighbourhood
- Location in Turkey Kışlacık (Turkey Central Anatolia)
- Coordinates: 40.4011°N 32.9328°E
- Country: Turkey
- Province: Ankara
- District: Çubuk
- Population (2022): 176
- Time zone: UTC+3 (TRT)

Kışlacık is a neighbourhood in the municipality and district of Çubuk, Ankara Province, Turkey. Its population is 176 (2022).
