= Kayalıdere, Göynük =

Kayalıdere
- Village
- Location within Turkey
- Coordinates: 40.3211°N 30.8085°E
- Country: Turkey
- Province: Bolu
- District: Göynük
- Population (2021): 131
- Time zone: UTC+3 (TRT)

Kayalıdere is a village in the Göynük District, Bolu Province, Turkey. Its population is 124 (2022).

== Geography ==
It is 120 km from Bolu province, 20 km from Göynük district.
