= Karaçam, Çubuk =

Karaçam
- Neighbourhood
- Location in Turkey Karaçam (Turkey Central Anatolia)
- Coordinates: 40.4530°N 32.9132°E
- Country: Turkey
- Province: Ankara
- District: Çubuk
- Population (2022): 35
- Time zone: UTC+3 (TRT)

Karaçam is a neighbourhood in the municipality and district of Çubuk, Ankara Province, Turkey. Its population is 35 (2022).
