= Kızılca, Çubuk =

Kızılca
- Neighbourhood
- Location in Turkey Kızılca (Turkey Central Anatolia)
- Coordinates: 40.1379°N 32.9208°E
- Country: Turkey
- Province: Ankara
- District: Çubuk
- Population (2022): 368
- Time zone: UTC+3 (TRT)

Kızılca is a neighbourhood in the municipality and district of Çubuk, Ankara Province, Turkey. Its population is 368 (2022).
