= Kayalıdere, Bigadiç =

Village in Turkey

Kayalıdere
- Neighbourhood
- Location in Turkey Kayalıdere (Marmara)
- Coordinates: 39.362°N 28.141°E
- Country: Turkey
- Province: Balıkesir
- District: Bigadiç
- Population (2022): 260
- Time zone: UTC+3 (TRT)

Kayalıdere is a neighbourhood in the municipality and district of Bigadiç, Balıkesir Province in Turkey. Its population is 260 (2022).
