= Kargın, Bigadiç =

Village in Turkey

Kargın
- Neighbourhood
- Location in Turkey Kargın (Marmara)
- Coordinates: 39.378°N 28.192°E
- Country: Turkey
- Province: Balıkesir
- District: Bigadiç
- Population (2022): 685
- Time zone: UTC+3 (TRT)

Kargın is a neighbourhood in the municipality and district of Bigadiç, Balıkesir Province in Turkey. Its population is 685 (2022).
