= Özlüce, Çubuk =

Özlüce
- Neighbourhood
- Location in Turkey Özlüce (Turkey Central Anatolia)
- Coordinates: 40.3096°N 32.9122°E
- Country: Turkey
- Province: Ankara
- District: Çubuk
- Population (2022): 61
- Time zone: UTC+3 (TRT)

Özlüce is a neighbourhood in the municipality and district of Çubuk, Ankara Province, Turkey. Its population is 61 (2022).
