= Meyvalı, Bigadiç =

Village in Turkey

Meyvalı
- Neighbourhood
- Location in Turkey Meyvalı (Marmara)
- Coordinates: 39°20′47″N 28°36′03″E
- Country: Turkey
- Province: Balıkesir
- District: Bigadiç
- Population (2022): 358
- Time zone: UTC+3 (TRT)

Meyvalı is a neighbourhood in the municipality and district of Bigadiç, Balıkesir Province in Turkey. Its population is 358 (2022).
