= Susuz, Çubuk =

Susuz
- Neighbourhood
- Location in Turkey Susuz (Turkey Central Anatolia)
- Coordinates: 40.3458°N 33.1058°E
- Country: Turkey
- Province: Ankara
- District: Çubuk
- Population (2022): 210
- Time zone: UTC+3 (TRT)

Susuz is a neighbourhood in the municipality and district of Çubuk, Ankara Province, Turkey. Its population is 210 (2022).
