= Osmanca, Bigadiç =

Village in Turkey

Osmanca
- Neighbourhood
- Location in Turkey Osmanca (Marmara)
- Coordinates: 39.489°N 28.158°E
- Country: Turkey
- Province: Balıkesir
- District: Bigadiç
- Population (2022): 352
- Time zone: UTC+3 (TRT)

Osmanca is a neighbourhood in the municipality and district of Bigadiç, Balıkesir Province in Turkey. Its population is 352 (2022).
