= Babaköy, Susurluk =

Village in Turkey

Babaköy
- Neighbourhood
- Location in Turkey Babaköy (Marmara)
- Coordinates: 39.7986°N 28.1321°E
- Country: Turkey
- Province: Balıkesir
- District: Susurluk
- Population (2022): 362
- Time zone: UTC+3 (TRT)

Babaköy is a neighbourhood in the municipality and district of Susurluk, Balıkesir Province in Turkey. Its population is 362 (2022).
