= Gökçedere, Çubuk =

Gökçedere
- Neighbourhood
- Location in Turkey Gökçedere (Turkey Central Anatolia)
- Coordinates: 40.2587°N 32.9951°E
- Country: Turkey
- Province: Ankara
- District: Çubuk
- Population (2022): 191
- Time zone: UTC+3 (TRT)

Gökçedere is a neighbourhood in the municipality and district of Çubuk, Ankara Province, Turkey. Its population is 191 (2022).
