= Aksaklar, Göynük =

Aksaklar
- Village
- Location within Turkey
- Coordinates: 40.2968°N 30.9651°E
- Country: Turkey
- Province: Bolu
- District: Göynük
- Population (2021): 99
- Time zone: UTC+3 (TRT)

Aksaklar is a village in the Göynük District, Bolu Province, Turkey. Its population is 99 (2021).

Aksaklar is located in a somewhat mountainous area, at an elevation of about 1,189 meters above sea level.
