= Dedeler, Çubuk =

Dedeler
- Neighbourhood
- Location in Turkey Dedeler (Turkey Central Anatolia)
- Coordinates: 40.2882°N 33.1637°E
- Country: Turkey
- Province: Ankara
- District: Çubuk
- Population (2022): 62
- Time zone: UTC+3 (TRT)

Dedeler is a neighbourhood in the municipality and district of Çubuk, Ankara Province, Turkey. Its population is 62 (2022).
