= Çatköy, Çubuk =

Çatköy
- Neighbourhood
- Location in Turkey Çatköy (Turkey Central Anatolia)
- Coordinates: 40°24′55″N 32°57′38″E
- Country: Turkey
- Province: Ankara
- District: Çubuk
- Population (2022): 122
- Time zone: UTC+3 (TRT)

Çatköy (also: Çatokcular) is a neighbourhood in the municipality and district of Çubuk, Ankara Province, Turkey. Its population is 122 (2022).
