= Akbayır, Çubuk =

Akbayır
- Neighbourhood
- Location in Turkey Akbayır (Turkey Central Anatolia)
- Coordinates: 40.2420°N 33.1804°E
- Country: Turkey
- Province: Ankara
- District: Çubuk
- Population (2022): 79
- Time zone: UTC+3 (TRT)

Akbayır is a neighbourhood in the municipality and district of Çubuk, Ankara Province, Turkey. Its population is 79 (2022).
