= Meyvəli =

- Municipality
- Location within Azerbaijan
- Coordinates: 40°45′32″N 47°16′26″E
- Country: Azerbaijan
- Rayon: Yevlakh

Population
  - Total: 227
- Time zone: UTC+4 (AZT)
  - Summer (DST): UTC+5 (AZT)

Meyvəli is a village and the least populous municipality in the Yevlakh Rayon of Azerbaijan. It has a population of 227.
