= Ömercik, Çubuk =

Ömercik
- Neighbourhood
- Location in Turkey Ömercik (Turkey Central Anatolia)
- Coordinates: 40.2303°N 33.1008°E
- Country: Turkey
- Province: Ankara
- District: Çubuk
- Population (2022): 94
- Time zone: UTC+3 (TRT)

Ömercik is a neighbourhood in the municipality and district of Çubuk, Ankara Province, Turkey. Its population is 94 (2022).
