= Aşağıçamlı, Bigadiç =

Village in Turkey

Aşağıçamlı
- Neighbourhood
- Location in Turkey Aşağıçamlı (Marmara)
- Coordinates: 39.355°N 28.449°E
- Country: Turkey
- Province: Balıkesir
- District: Bigadiç
- Population (2022): 96
- Time zone: UTC+3 (TRT)

Aşağıçamlı is a neighbourhood in the municipality and district of Bigadiç, Balıkesir Province in Turkey. Its population is 96 (2022).
