= Dedeler, Tarsus =

Dedeler
- Neighbourhood
- Location in Turkey
- Coordinates: 36°57′36″N 34°47′13″E
- Country: Turkey
- Province: Mersin
- District: Tarsus
- Elevation: 215 m (705 ft)
- Population (2022): 633
- Time zone: UTC+3 (TRT)
- Area code: 0324

Dedeler is a neighbourhood in the municipality and district of Tarsus, Mersin Province, Turkey. Its population is 633 (2022). It is close to Eshabıkehf, the cave of Seven Sleepers, which is considered as a pilgrimage center by some. It is located 11 kilometres (6.8 mi) away from Tarsus and 38 kilometres (24 mi) away from Mersin.
