= İkipınar, Çubuk =

İkipınar
- Neighbourhood
- Location in Turkey İkipınar (Turkey Central Anatolia)
- Coordinates: 40.1640°N 32.9121°E
- Country: Turkey
- Province: Ankara
- District: Çubuk
- Population (2022): 175
- Time zone: UTC+3 (TRT)

İkipınar is a neighbourhood in the municipality and district of Çubuk, Ankara Province, Turkey. Its population is 175 (2022).
