= Yeşilyazı, Göynük =

Yeşilyazı
- Village
- Location within Turkey
- Coordinates: 40.4975°N 30.9850°E
- Country: Turkey
- Province: Bolu
- District: Göynük
- Population (2021): 56
- Time zone: UTC+3 (TRT)

Yeşilyazı is a village in the Göynük District, Bolu Province, Turkey. Its population is 56 (2021).
