= Yukarıçamlı, Bigadiç =

Village in Turkey

Yukarıçamlı
- Neighbourhood
- Location in Turkey Yukarıçamlı (Marmara)
- Coordinates: 39.333°N 28.438°E
- Country: Turkey
- Province: Balıkesir
- District: Bigadiç
- Population (2022): 42
- Time zone: UTC+3 (TRT)

Yukarıçamlı is a neighbourhood in the municipality and district of Bigadiç, Balıkesir Province in Turkey. Its population is 42 (2022).
