= Kızılöz, Çubuk =

Kızılöz
- Neighbourhood
- Location in Turkey Kızılöz (Turkey Central Anatolia)
- Coordinates: 40.2858°N 33.0842°E
- Country: Turkey
- Province: Ankara
- District: Çubuk
- Population (2022): 50
- Time zone: UTC+3 (TRT)

Kızılöz is a neighbourhood in the municipality and district of Çubuk, Ankara Province, Turkey. Its population is 50 (2022).
