= Kargın, Çubuk =

Kargın
- Neighbourhood
- Location in Turkey Kargın (Turkey Central Anatolia)
- Coordinates: 40.2580°N 33.0732°E
- Country: Turkey
- Province: Ankara
- District: Çubuk
- Population (2022): 184
- Time zone: UTC+3 (TRT)

Kargın is a neighbourhood in the municipality and district of Çubuk, Ankara Province, Turkey. Its population is 184 (2022).
