= Babaköy, Bigadiç =

Village in Turkey

Babaköy
- Neighbourhood
- Location in Turkey Babaköy (Marmara)
- Coordinates: 39.400°N 28.043°E
- Country: Turkey
- Province: Balıkesir
- District: Bigadiç
- Population (2022): 651
- Time zone: UTC+3 (TRT)

Babaköy is a neighbourhood in the municipality and district of Bigadiç, Balıkesir Province in Turkey. Its population is 651 (2022).
