= İğciler, Bigadiç =

Village in Turkey

İğciler
- Neighbourhood
- Location in Turkey İğciler (Marmara)
- Coordinates: 39°29′37″N 28°21′21″E
- Country: Turkey
- Province: Balıkesir
- District: Bigadiç
- Population (2022): 59
- Time zone: UTC+3 (TRT)

İğciler is a neighbourhood in the municipality and district of Bigadiç, Balıkesir Province in Turkey. Its population is 59 (2022).
