= Susuz, Göynük =

Susuz
- Village
- Location within Turkey
- Coordinates: 40.3418°N 30.8471°E
- Country: Turkey
- Province: Bolu
- District: Göynük
- Population (2021): 183
- Time zone: UTC+3 (TRT)

Susuz is a village in the Göynük District, Bolu Province, Turkey. Its population is 183 (2021).
