= Hisarköy =

Hisarköy ('fortress village') is a Turkish place name and it may refer to:

- Hisarköy, Ağlasun
- Hisarköy, Burhaniye
- Hisarköy, Kurucaşile a village in Kurucaşile district of Bartın Province
- Hisarköy, Ulus a village in Ulus district of Bartın Province
- Hisarköy, Mut a village in Mut district of Mersin Province
- Hisarköy, Emirdağ a village in Emirdağ district of Afyonkarahisar Province, the location of ancient and Byzantine Amorium
- Hisarköy, Sarayköy
- Hisarköy, Girne a village in Girne district of Northern Cyprus
