= Çamtepe =

Çamtepe can refer to:

- Çamtepe, Burhaniye
- Çamtepe, Tarsus
