= Çallı =

Çallı can refer to:

- Çallı, Burhaniye, Turkey
- Çallı, Güroymak, Turkey
- Çallı, Zardab, Azerbaijan

Calli can refer to: Callus (cell biology).
