= Yumrutaş =

Yumrutaş can refer to:

- Yumrutaş, Acıpayam
- Yumrutaş, Ağlasun
- Yumrutaş, Mengen
