= Damlalı =

Damlalı can refer to:

- Damlalı, Burhaniye
- Damlalı, Tufanbeyli
