= Borazan İsmail Çavuş =

Turkish war hero

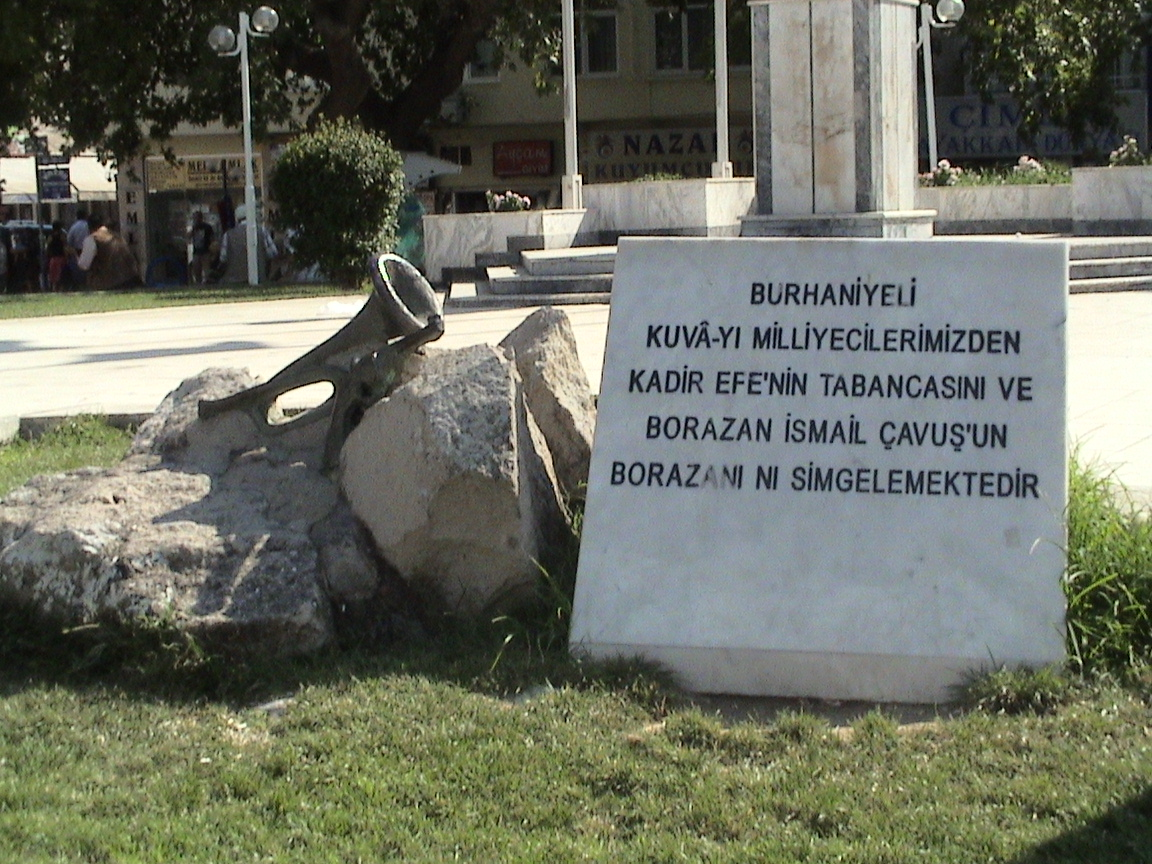
- Sculpture honoring Borazan İsmail Çavuş in front of the Atatürk statue in Burhaniye
- Born: 1893; Pelitköy, Burhaniye
- Died: 1972 (aged 78–79); Burhaniye
- Relatives: Mehmet (father) ?
- Military career
- Allegiance: Ottoman Empire (1913–1919?); Turkey
- Branch: Ottoman Army; Turkish Army (volunteered Kuva-yi Milliye)
- Service years: 1913–1919? (Ottoman Army) 1922-19?? (as Kuva-yi Milliye)
- Rank: Onbaşı (Corporal)
- Nickname: Borazan Mehmet oğlu İsmail
- Unit: 28'th Tumen (Ottoman Army)
- Conflicts: Suez front Süveyş Cephesi Battle of Çanakkale as part of World War I Defence of Burhaniye as part of the Greco-Turkish War Turkish Liberation War

Borazan İsmail Çavuş (1893–1972) was a Turkish war hero from Balıkesir. He is known for playing the Bugle which played a part when he, as a volunteer, defended the city of Burhaniye against Greek forces on the western front of the Turkish War of Independence, also known as the Greco-Turkish War (1919–1922). He played an instrumental part in the defense of the coastal town against a large retreating Greek occupational force that was burning and destroying as they retreated.

== Early life and military service ==
İsmail was born in the Pelitköy village of Burhaniye. İsmail was his real name. He joined the army at the age of 20 and after 1 year of service, following the outbreak of WW1, is sent to the Suez front. Together with his unit, the 28'th Tumen, he fought against English and Arabs in the desert. Many of his brothers in arms fall casualty and his unit returns to Çanakkale afterwards. He is chosen as one of the exceptional men of the 28'th Tumen to become a Bugle player and is promoted to the rank of Onbaşı. He had learned to play the bugle during battles in Çanakkale. He soon became known as Borazan (Bugle).

== Volunteering in the Turkish Liberation War ==
He joined the national struggle known as the Turkish Liberation War voluntarily. Together with a small detachment of volunteers, a Kuva-yi Milliye that he formed, he moved around the back of enemy units and severed their telephone communication lines and performed frequent raids on the enemy.

=== Saving Burhaniye ===
İsmail Çavuş prevented the destruction and burning of Burhaniye by the Greeks using his military experience. The Greeks were retreating from Burhaniye which they had occupied in the beginning of the war, and as they retreated it was common for them to leave behind the defenseless towns burned and destroyed. They intended to do the same with the town center of Burhaniye.

On 7 September 1922 the Greek occupying commander bans people from leaving their homes in the occupied town and threatens that those leaving their homes will be shot. They are preparing to burn and destroy the town. This was thwarted by İsmail Çavuş who with a few other men entered the occupied town undetected and positioned his men in different places of the town, alerting the townsfolk of the situation and explaining his plan. The plan is that when he plays his bugle everyone will create a yell and fire their guns at the same time. When it becomes dark he climbs up to the top of the minaret of the Hanay Mosque and keeps a lookout over the town.

On 8 September 1922 in the early morning hours he spots the Greek enemy units approaching and he immediately starts playing the attack tune on his bugle.

Bugle Attack Tune

The other soldiers who had secretly entered the town with him and are ready and waiting in their positions start to fire their weapons and the townsfolk, who wake up from all that noise, now understand that the enemy has arrived and also begin to fire weapons and yell alongside the soldiers who are already firing. They trick the approaching Greek forces into thinking that the town has a large Turkish military presence that is about to ambush them and the Greeks flee from the town and continue their retreat to the west coast and the town is saved.

== Legacy ==
Having served valiantly at Çanakkale and in the war of independence he is considered a hero by the people and is offered worldly goods such as houses, plantations, gardens and olive tree fields, however refuses them all. He did not do it for the reward, he sacrificed his life unconditionally for the love of his country and his people. He died in 1972 in Burhaniye. Around this time the well known Turkish sculptor Gürdal Duyar created a sculpture depicting İsmail Çavuş for Burhaniye. Around 1992 this sculpture was removed by the mayor at the time. Another monument in honor of Borazan İsmail can be found in front of the Atatürk statue in Burhaniye. The monument features a bugle and a revolver sitting on a stone base next to a marble slab with black text on the front face explaining the meaning of the monument. He is remembered and honored as a hero for his service and heroic deeds in saving Burhaniye.

== See also ==
- Pelitköy
- Kuva-yi Milliye
