= Marc Waelkens =

Belgian archaeologist (1948–2021)

- Born: 12 April 1948; Waregem, Belgium
- Died: 21 February 2021 (aged 72); Oud-Heverlee, Belgium

Academic background
- Education: Ghent University

Academic work
- Discipline: Archaeology
- Institutions: KU Leuven

Marc, Knight Waelkens (Dutch pronunciation: [mɑr(ə)k ˈʋaːlkəns]; 12 April 1948 – 21 February 2021) was a professor emeritus of archaeology at the Katholieke Universiteit Leuven in Belgium. He was director of the excavation at the Pisidian city of Sagalassos in Turkey. The research project has become one of the biggest and most interdisciplinary excavations in the Mediterranean, where all aspects of the city and its territory are studied by means of a variety of modern research techniques.

Waelkens has also participated in archaeological studies in Greece, Syria, Italy and Egypt. His doctoral research and early concentration involved Phrygian tombstones and sarcophagi. He identified the workshop at Dokimeion near Afyon, and tried to identify the provenance of the types of stone used and the production patterns.

== Career ==
Waelkens got his licentiate in art history at the State University of Ghent, where he was awarded the Schaepdrijversprijs for the best licentiate (i.e. MA) thesis in history. In 1976, he obtained his doctorate in art history. After having conducted research in places such as Bonn, Berlin, Washington D.C., Princeton, and Oberlin, Ohio, he went on to teach at the Catholic University of Leuven, where he was promoted to full professor in 1986. Consequently, he became president of the Department of Archaeology, Art History, and Musicology. During his career, he has been involved in excavations in Turkey (Sagalassos), Greece, Syria, and Italy.

Among other projects, professor Waelkens was:

- Founder of the Centre for Archaeological Sciences, one of 12 centres of excellence at Leuven University
- Co-founder and former vice-president of ASMOSIA (i.e. the Association for the Study of Marble and Other Stones used in Antiquity)
- Member (since 1988) of the Class of Humanities at the Royal Flemish Academy of Belgium for Science and the Arts

== Sagalassos ==
In 1986, an extensive prospection was carried out on the hills around Ağlasun, Turkey, where the ruins of the ancient city of Sagalassos are located. Thanks to the systematic archaeological excavations, which started in 1990 and are known as the Sagalassos Archeological Research Project, professor Waelkens and his team of collaborators achieved international recognition. The scale of the operation, covering a territory of 1,800 square kilometers, the duration of the excavations, the multidisciplinary approach, and the use of modern, innovative, and creative research and restoration methods, make this enterprise unique in the world. In Sagalassos, scientists of several disciplines are set to work, including archaeologists, cartographers, geologists, geomorphologists, archaeozoologists, anthropologists, palaeobotanists, palynologists, ethnographers, and architects.

This first visit to Sagalassos turned my life upside down and formed the basis of all the ‘happy’ and ‘tragic’ moments I’ve experienced since then. The latter were offset by the many magical moments, like when an eagle accompanied us, barely two meters in front of our minibus, as we approached Ağlasun. It was as if we drove under the protection of Zeus himself. Or that one evening at dusk, when I turned over the intact head of the ‘smaller’ Dionysos from the Antonine Nymphaeum and the god stared at me, smiling. He seemed grateful to see the light of day again, after fourteen centuries.

— Marc Waelkens, in the Visitor's Companion to Sagalassos

The archaeological soil analysis of the Turkish city of Sagalassos can be considered professor Waelkens' life work. Indeed, Sagalassos is an archaeological pleasure ground because the site has remained relatively unscathed thanks to the meter-thick layer of sediment that covers it, and to its isolated location that has prevented large-scale ransacking.

During excavations in 2007, pieces of a colossal statue of the emperor Hadrian's were surfaced. It was exhibited in the British Museum in the summer of 2008, in the framework of the Hadrian, Empire and Conflict exhibition. The statue's head and feet measure 0.80 m. In its original state, the statue should have been 5 m tall.

== Honours and awards ==
- (Belgium) Ernest-John Solvay Scientific Prize for the Humanities (2000)
- (Turkey) Distinguished Service Award of the Ministry of Foreign Affairs (2001)
- (Belgium) Honorary citizenship of the city of Waregem (7 March 2006)
- (Belgium) Ennoblement with the title of knight (Royal Decree, 9 July 2008)
