= Şahinler =

Şahinler can refer to:

- Şahinler, Burhaniye
- Şahinler, Gülşehir
- Şahinler, Kemaliye

For the village in Cyprus called Şahinler in Turkish, see Masari.
