= Yunuslar =

Yunuslar can refer to:

- Yunuslar, Burhaniye
- Yunuslar, Dursunbey, a village in Turkey
- Yunuslar, Gerede, a village in Turkey
- Yunuslar (Tram İzmir), a light-rail station
