= Kurucaoluk =

Kurucaoluk can refer to:

- Kurucaoluk, Burhaniye
- Kurucaoluk, Susurluk
