= Kiprit, Ağlasun =

Village in Turkey

Kiprit
- Village
- Location in Turkey
- Coordinates: 37°36′N 30°30′E
- Country: Turkey
- Province: Burdur
- District: Ağlasun
- Population (2021): 250
- Time zone: UTC+3 (TRT)

Kiprit is a village in the Ağlasun District of Burdur Province in Turkey. Its population is 250 (2021).
