= Yeşilbaşköy =

- Village
- Location within Turkey
- Coordinates: 37°39′N 30°30′E
- Country: Turkey
- Province: Burdur
- District: Ağlasun
- Elevation: 1,210 m (3,970 ft)
- Population (2021): 1,331
- Time zone: UTC+3 (TRT)
- Postal code: 15810
- Area code: 0248

Yeşilbaşköy is a village in Ağlasun District of Burdur Province, Turkey. Its population is 1,331 (2021). Before the 2013 reorganisation, it was a town (belde). It is situated slightly to the northwest of the road connecting Burdur to Ağlasun. The distance to Ağlasun is 4 kilometres (2.5 mi) and to Burdur is 27 kilometres (17 mi). The village is an old settlement. According to oral tradition, about 750 years ago it was founded by three men. In 1978 it was declared a seat of township. Town economy depends on cherry farming. (Cherries are locally called "red diamond") Peach, rose and salmon are also produced.
