= Sübeylidere, Burhaniye =

Village in Turkey

Sübeylidere
- Neighbourhood
- Location in Turkey Sübeylidere (Marmara)
- Coordinates: 39°24′N 27°02′E
- Country: Turkey
- Province: Balıkesir
- District: Burhaniye
- Population (2022): 229
- Time zone: UTC+3 (TRT)

Sübeylidere is a neighbourhood in the municipality and district of Burhaniye, Balıkesir Province in Turkey. Its population is 229 (2022).
