= Taylıeli, Burhaniye =

Village in Turkey

Taylıeli
- Neighbourhood
- Location within Turkey Location within Marmara
- Coordinates: 39°28′N 26°56′E
- Country: Turkey
- Province: Balıkesir
- District: Burhaniye
- Population (2022): 264
- Time zone: UTC+3 (TRT)

Taylıeli is a neighbourhood in the municipality and district of Burhaniye, Balıkesir Province in Turkey. Its population is 264 (2022).

Landscape photo taken in Taylıeli
