= Yazır, Ağlasun =

Village in Turkey

Yazır
- Village
- Location in Turkey
- Coordinates: 37°39′16″N 30°35′36″E
- Country: Turkey
- Province: Burdur
- District: Ağlasun
- Population (2021): 598
- Time zone: UTC+3 (TRT)

Yazır is a village in the Ağlasun District of Burdur Province in Turkey. Its population is 598 (2021).
