= Kızıklı, Burhaniye =

Village in Turkey

Kızıklı
- Neighbourhood
- Location in Turkey Kızıklı (Marmara)
- Coordinates: 39°30′10″N 27°2′3″E
- Country: Turkey
- Province: Balıkesir
- District: Burhaniye
- Population (2022): 1,672
- Time zone: UTC+3 (TRT)

Kızıklı is a neighbourhood in the municipality and district of Burhaniye, Balıkesir Province in Turkey. Its population is 1,672 (2022).
