= Kırtık, Burhaniye =

Village in Turkey

Kırtık
- Neighbourhood
- Location in Turkey Kırtık (Marmara)
- Coordinates: 39°23′12″N 27°02′19″E
- Country: Turkey
- Province: Balıkesir
- District: Burhaniye
- Population (2022): 228
- Time zone: UTC+3 (TRT)

Kırtık is a neighbourhood in the municipality and district of Burhaniye, Balıkesir Province in Turkey. Its population is 228 (2022).
