= Börezli, Burhaniye =

Village in Turkey

Börezli
- Neighbourhood
- Location in Turkey Börezli (Marmara)
- Coordinates: 39°29′49″N 27°01′41″E
- Country: Turkey
- Province: Balıkesir
- District: Burhaniye
- Population (2022): 2,729
- Time zone: UTC+3 (TRT)

Börezli is a neighbourhood in the municipality and district of Burhaniye, Balıkesir Province in Turkey. Its population is 2,729 (2022).
