= Burhaniye =

- District and municipality
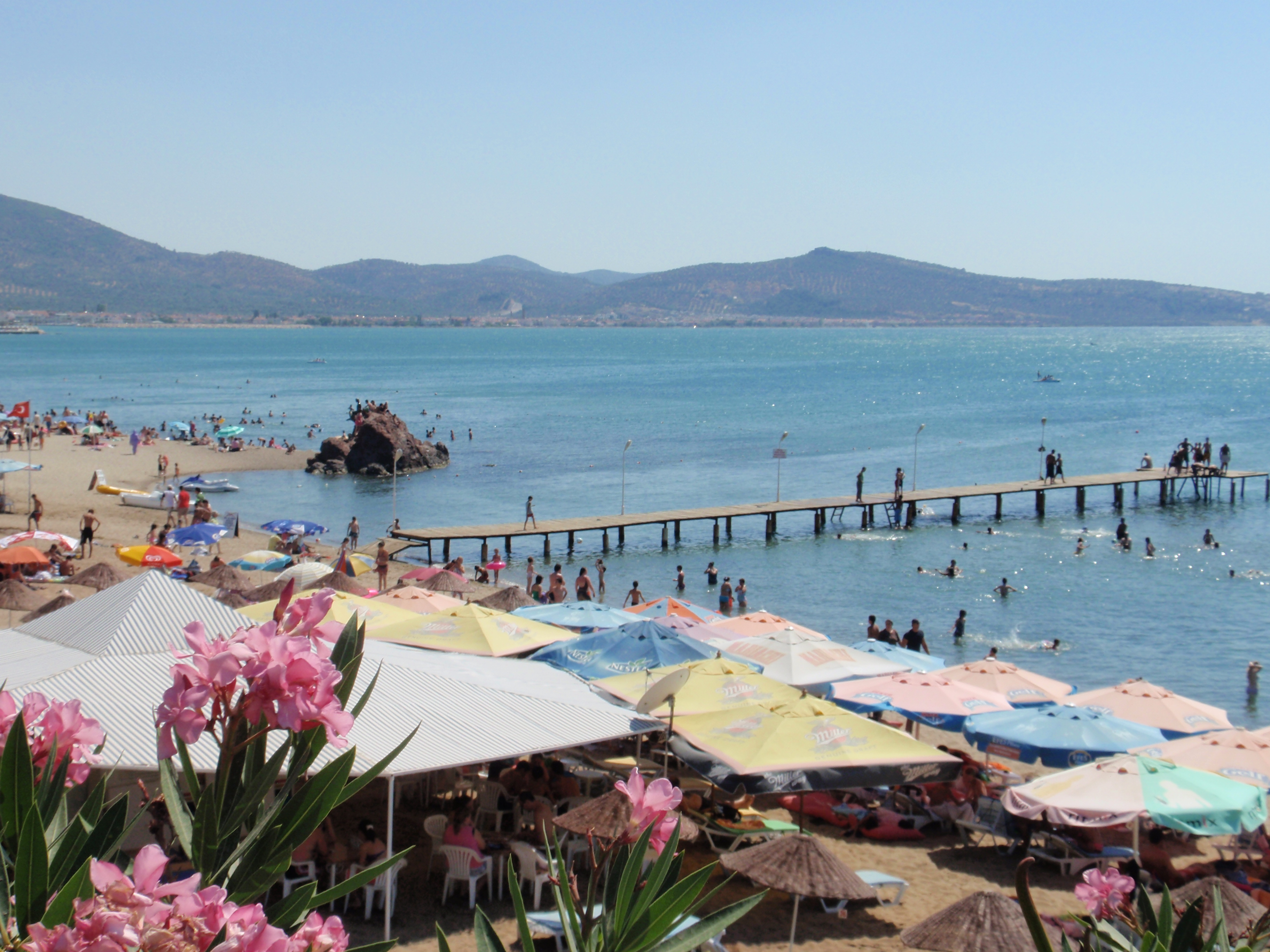
- Burhaniye, Ören Beach

- Map showing Burhaniye District in Balıkesir Province

- Location within Turkey Location within Marmara
- Coordinates: 39°30′N 26°57′E
- Country: Turkey
- Province: Balıkesir

Government
  - Mayor: Ali Kemal Deveciler (CHP)
- Area: 420 km^{2} (160 sq mi)
- Population (2022): 64,283
  - Density: 150/km^{2} (400/sq mi)
- Time zone: UTC+3 (TRT)
- Postal code: 10700
- Area code: 0266
- Website: www.burhaniye.bel.tr

Burhaniye is a municipality and district of Balıkesir Province, Turkey. Its area is 420 km^{2}, and its population is 64,283 (2022). It is located on the Aegean coast and is known for its olive oil. Balıkesir Koca Seyit Airport is ten minutes away by car. Burhaniye has a port and a museum of archeology. A museum for the Turkish National Movement was inaugurated in 2008 under the name Burhaniye Kuvay-ı Milliye Müzesi.

A biennial festival, Ören Tourism and Art Festival, is organized in July.

== History ==
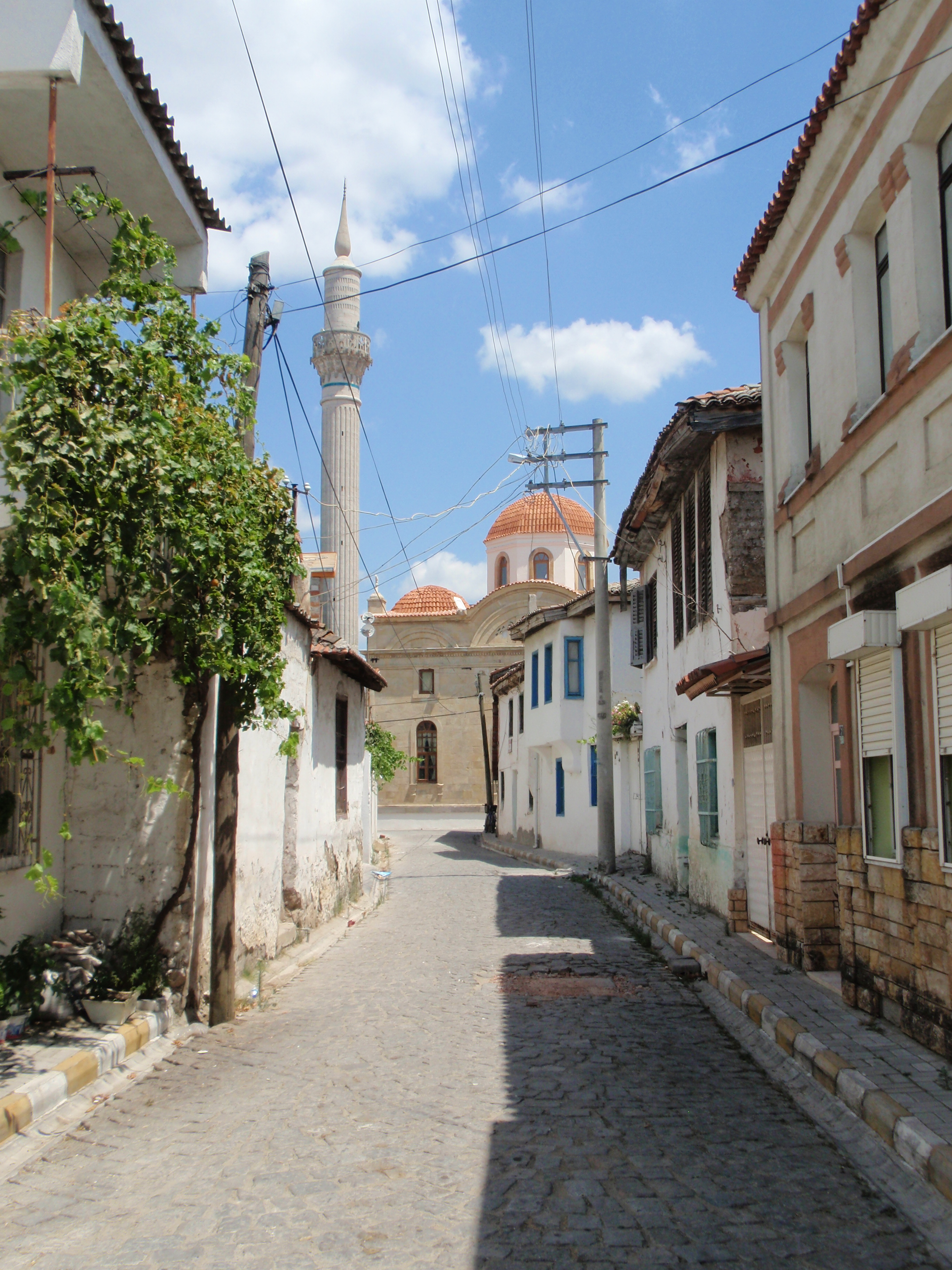
Hocaahmet Mosque, Burhaniye. After the collapse of the roof, a new roof was built by Greek craftsman Andriya

Burhaniye was founded as Taylıeli ('Town of Taylı') village, named after one of the Turkish beys who came to the aid of Seljuk ruler Süleyman. At the beginning of the 14th century it came under the domain of the Karasids and grew as it attracted migrants. In Ottoman times, it was also known as Kemer and attached to Edremit until 1866 and became the centre of a district named after itself. It was renamed Burhaniye after the Ottoman Prince Şehzade Burhanettin. According to the Ottoman General Census of 1881/82-1893, the kaza of Burhaniye had a total population of 19.595, consisting of 17.145 Muslims, 2.433 Greeks, 9 Armenians and 8 foreign citizens.

On 8 June 1922 the town was fell to Turkish forces. As the Greek forces were retreating they intended to burn and destroy the town center, however this was prevented by Borazan Çavuş from Pelitköy, who climbed on a minaret and when he saw the Greek enemy units approaching, played the attack tune on his bugle. He tricked the Greeks into thinking that the town center had a Turkish military presence and thus the Greeks continued their retreat without entering the town center and it was saved from destruction. In front of a statue of Atatürk is a monument with a sculpture of a rifle and bugle in commemoration of Borazan Çavuş and the Kuva-yi Milliye. Until 1992 there was also a sculpture by Gürdal Duyar depicting Borazan Çavuş.

Burhaniye is 4 kilometres east of the site of ancient Adramyttium, which was later moved 13 kilometres northeast to Edremit. Its history is described in the article on the modern town, which has inherited the name of the old.

== Composition ==
There are 39 neighbourhoods in Burhaniye District:

- Ağacık
- Ali Çetinkaya
- Avunduk
- Bahadınlı
- Bahçelievler
- Börezli
- Çallı
- Çamtepe
- Çoruk
- Cumhuriyet
- Damlalı
- Dutluca
- Geriş
- Hacıahmet
- Hacıbozlar
- Hisarköy
- Hürriyet
- İskele
- Karadere
- Kırtık
- Kızıklı
- Kocacami
- Kurucaoluk
- Kuyucak
- Kuyumcu
- Mahkeme
- Memiş
- Öğretmenler
- Ören
- Pelitköy
- Şahinler
- Şarköy
- Sübeylidere
- Tahtacı
- Taylıeli
- Yabancılar
- Yaylacık
- Yunus
- Yunuslar

== Climate ==
Burhaniye has a Mediterranean climate (Köppen: Csa) with hot, dry summers and mild, rainy winters.

Climate data for Burhaniye (1991–2020)
Month	Jan	Feb	Mar	Apr	May	Jun	Jul	Aug	Sep	Oct	Nov	Dec	Year
Mean daily maximum °C (°F)	11.6 (52.9)	12.7 (54.9)	15.7 (60.3)	20.2 (68.4)	25.5 (77.9)	30.4 (86.7)	33.1 (91.6)	33.2 (91.8)	28.8 (83.8)	23.2 (73.8)	17.7 (63.9)	13.2 (55.8)	22.2 (72.0)
Daily mean °C (°F)	7.1 (44.8)	8.0 (46.4)	10.4 (50.7)	14.3 (57.7)	19.6 (67.3)	24.4 (75.9)	27.2 (81.0)	27.2 (81.0)	22.7 (72.9)	17.6 (63.7)	12.6 (54.7)	8.8 (47.8)	16.7 (62.1)
Mean daily minimum °C (°F)	3.3 (37.9)	3.9 (39.0)	5.5 (41.9)	8.7 (47.7)	13.5 (56.3)	18.1 (64.6)	21.3 (70.3)	21.8 (71.2)	17.1 (62.8)	12.8 (55.0)	8.2 (46.8)	5.1 (41.2)	11.6 (52.9)
Average precipitation mm (inches)	88.16 (3.47)	88.85 (3.50)	56.47 (2.22)	51.32 (2.02)	35.54 (1.40)	18.02 (0.71)	4.35 (0.17)	5.77 (0.23)	21.43 (0.84)	58.18 (2.29)	83.55 (3.29)	97.62 (3.84)	609.26 (23.99)
Average precipitation days (≥ 1.0 mm)	8.5	7.3	6.7	5.8	4.3	2.6	1.4	1.2	2.9	4.6	6.2	8.1	59.6
Average relative humidity (%)	71.9	69.5	66.0	63.1	58.6	52.5	47.3	48.9	54.9	64.8	70.8	72.6	61.5
Source: NOAA

== Twin towns — sister cities ==
Burhaniye is twinned with:

- Bijelo Polje, Montenegro (2012)
- Hürth, Germany (2011)
- Murfatlar, Romania

== Gallery ==
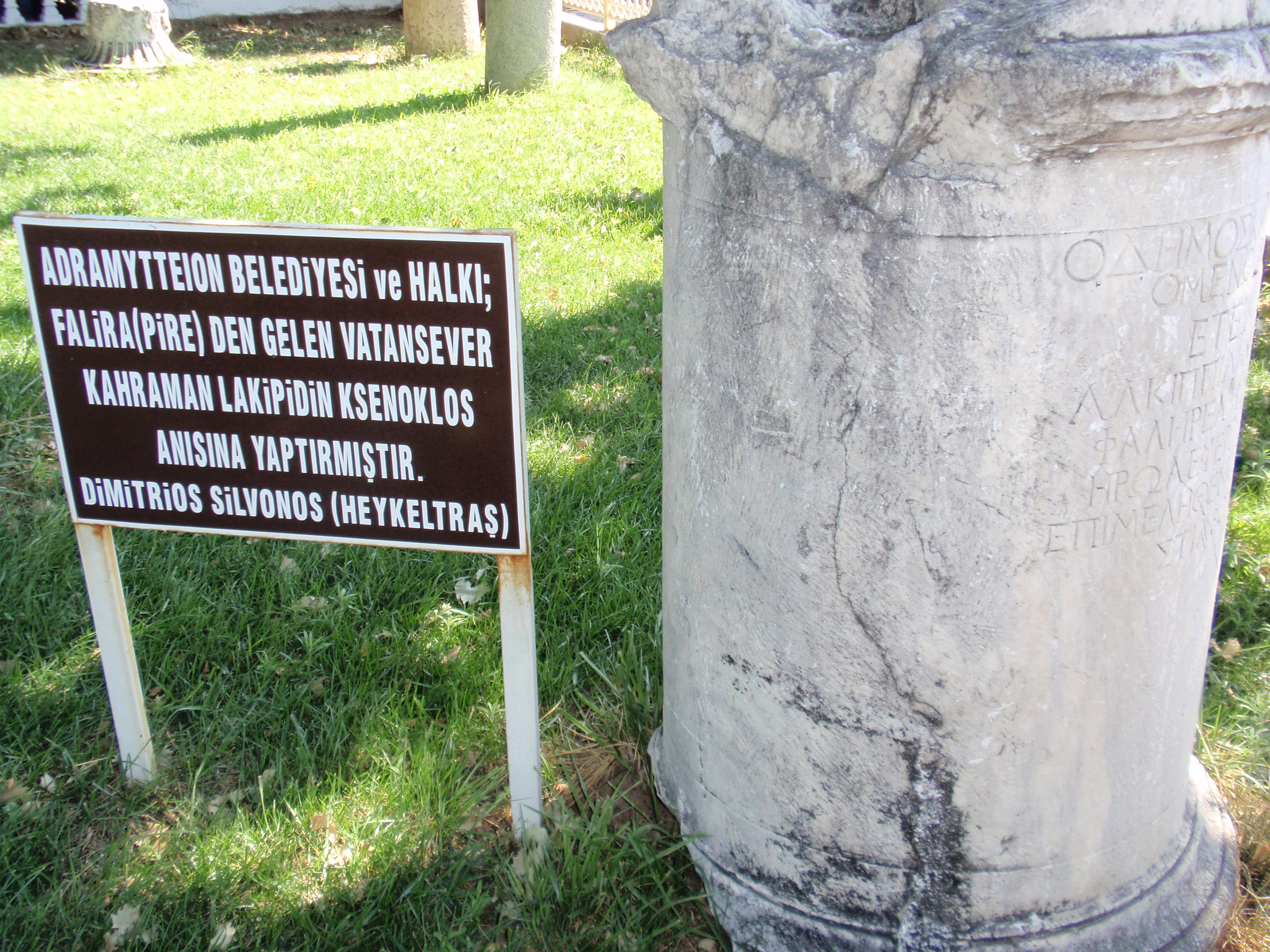
Archeological site in Burhaniye

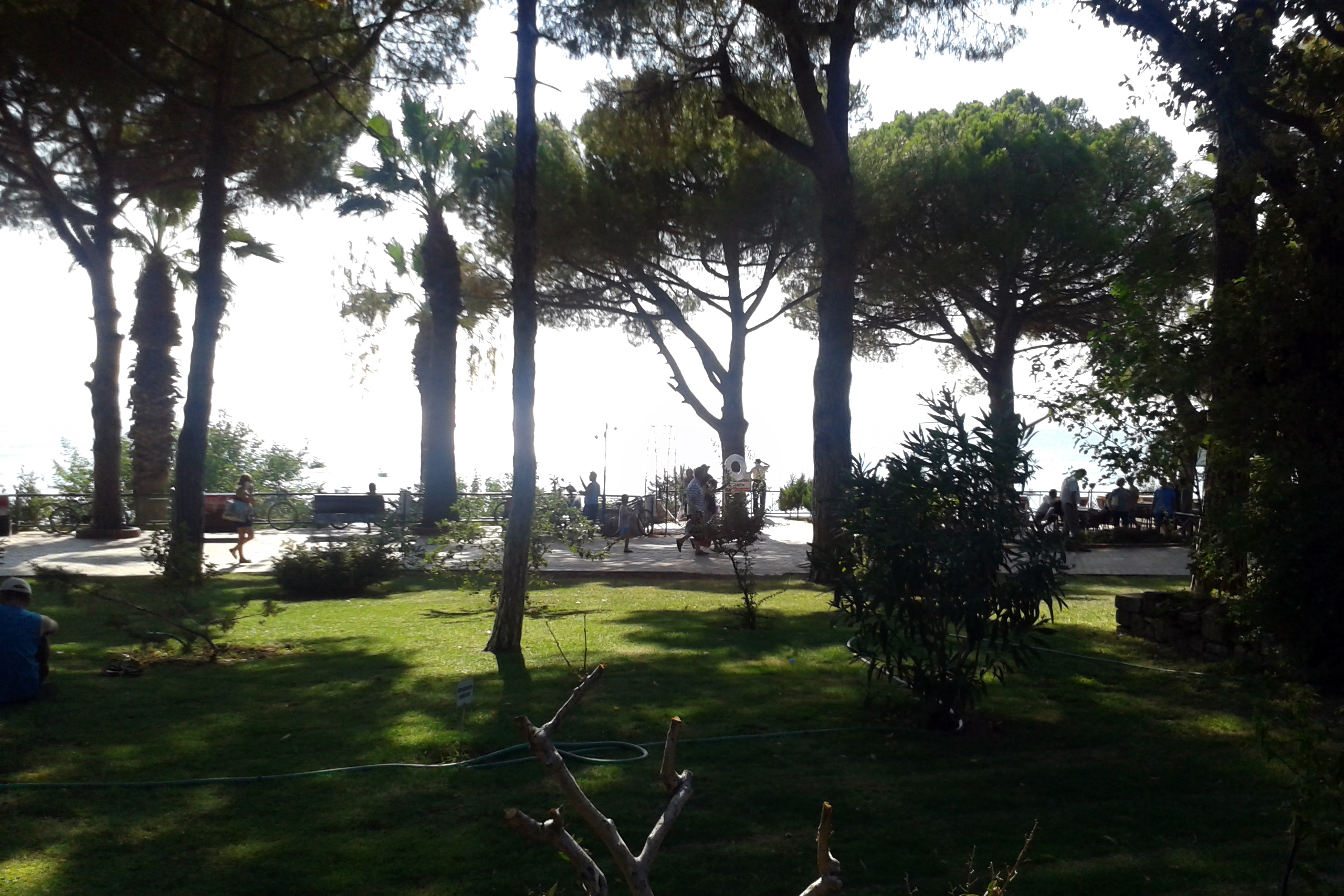
Ören

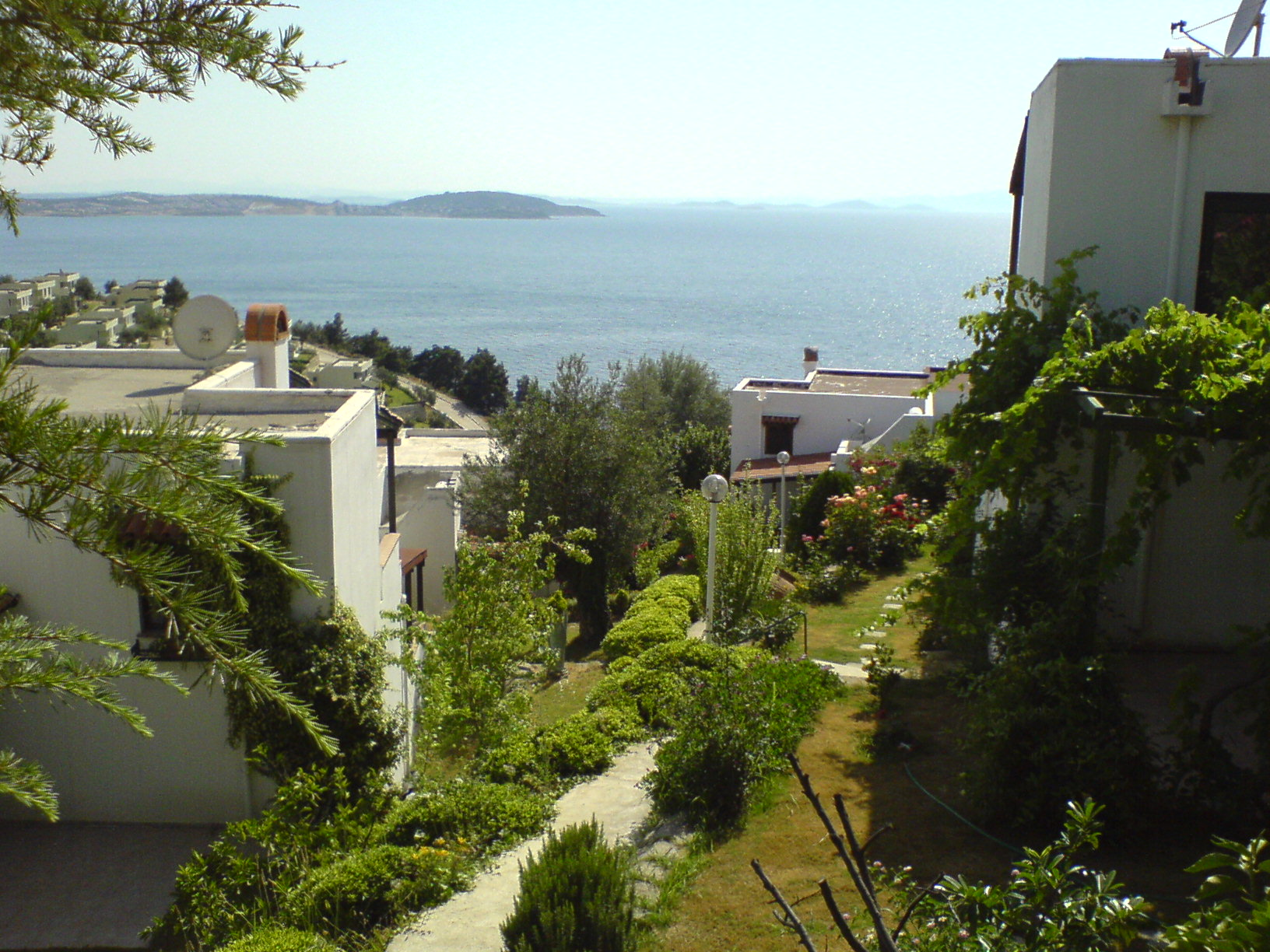
Pelitköy holiday village

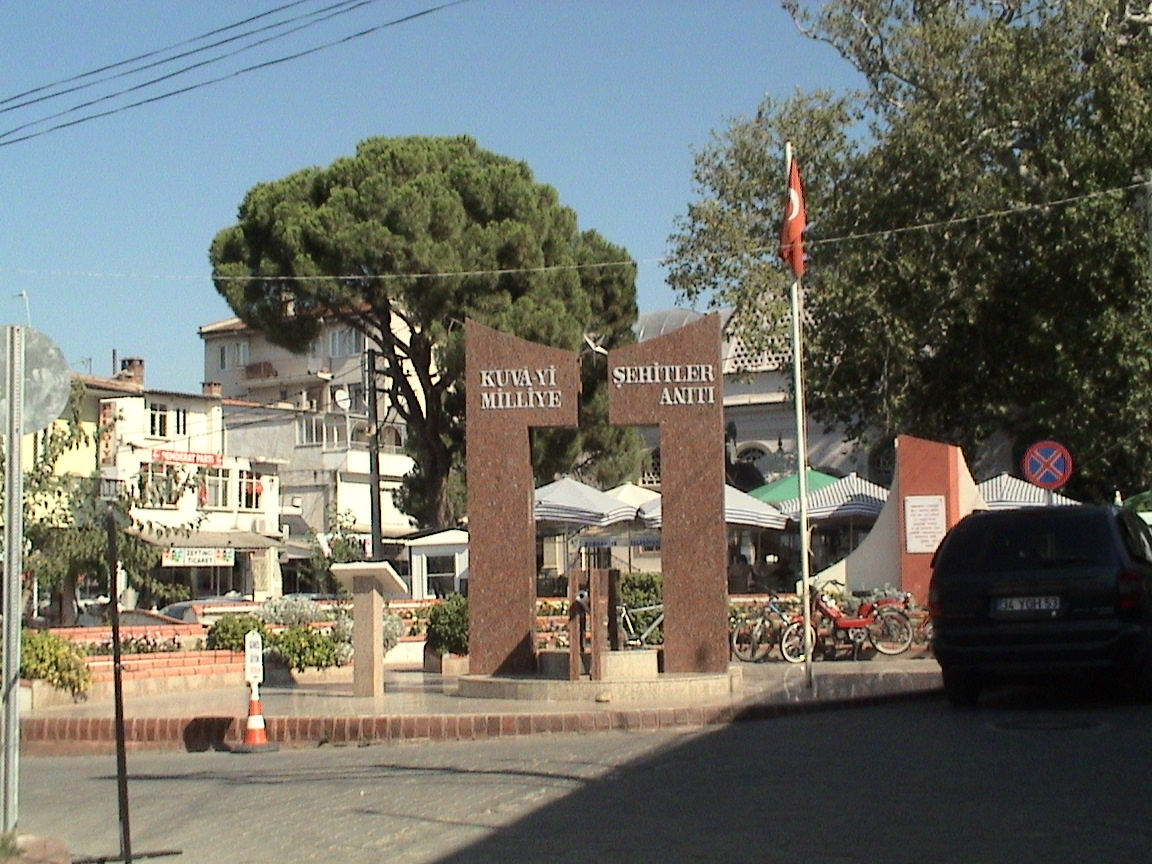
Burhaniye Memorial for Martyrs

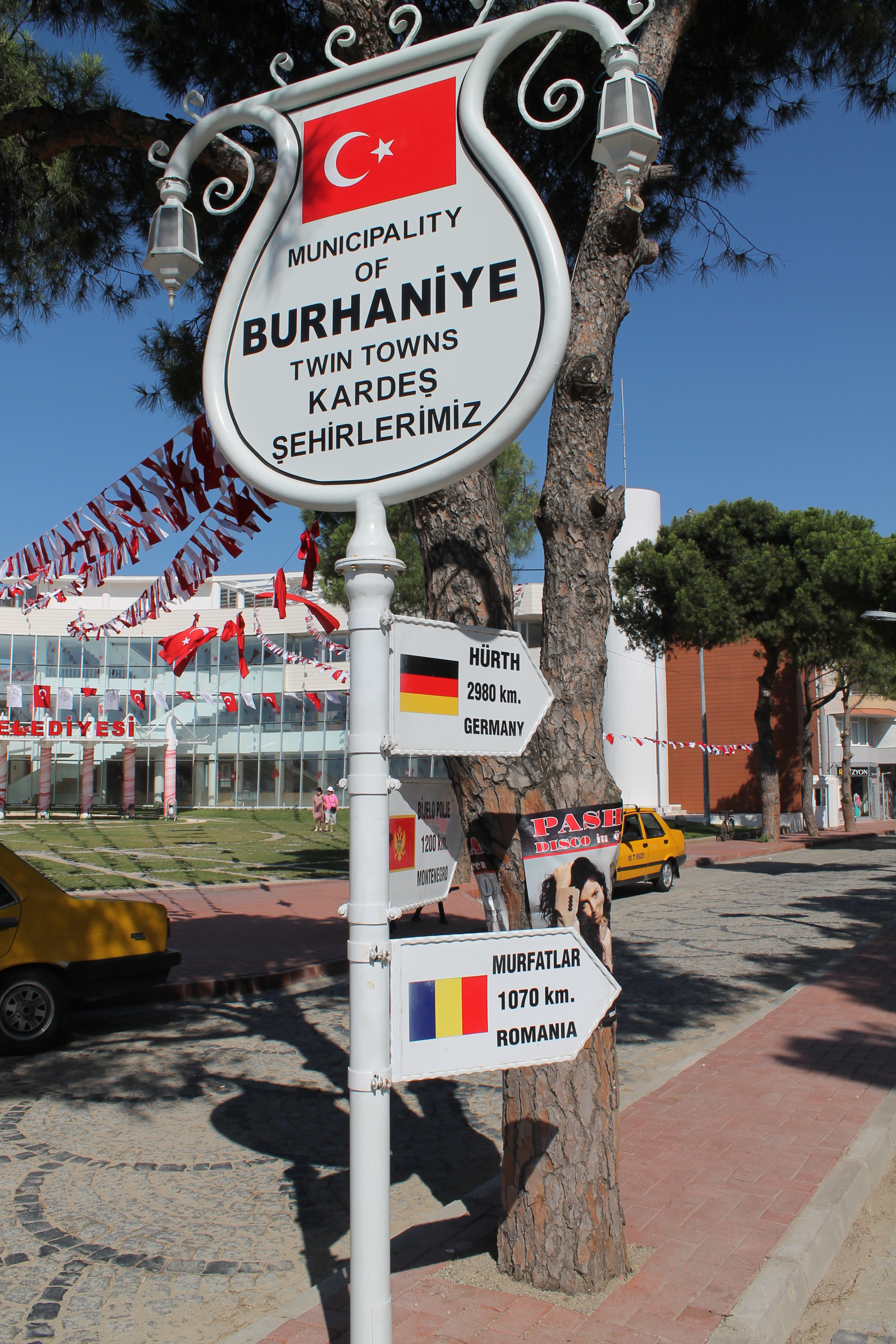
Twin towns of Burhaniye

== See also ==
- Borazan İsmail Çavuş
