= Yabancılar, Burhaniye =

Village in Turkey

Yabancılar
- Neighbourhood
- Location in Turkey Yabancılar (Marmara)
- Coordinates: 39°23′N 26°59′E
- Country: Turkey
- Province: Balıkesir
- District: Burhaniye
- Population (2022): 127
- Time zone: UTC+3 (TRT)

Yabancılar is a neighbourhood in the municipality and district of Burhaniye, Balıkesir Province in Turkey. Its population is 127 (2022).
