= Yaylacık, Burhaniye =

Village in Turkey

Yaylacık
- Neighbourhood
- Location in Turkey Yaylacık (Marmara)
- Coordinates: 39°25′37″N 27°02′35″E
- Country: Turkey
- Province: Balıkesir
- District: Burhaniye
- Population (2022): 320
- Time zone: UTC+3 (TRT)

Yaylacık is a neighbourhood in the municipality and district of Burhaniye, Balıkesir Province in Turkey. Its population is 320 (2022).
