= Ağlasun District =

District of Burdur Province, Turkey

- District
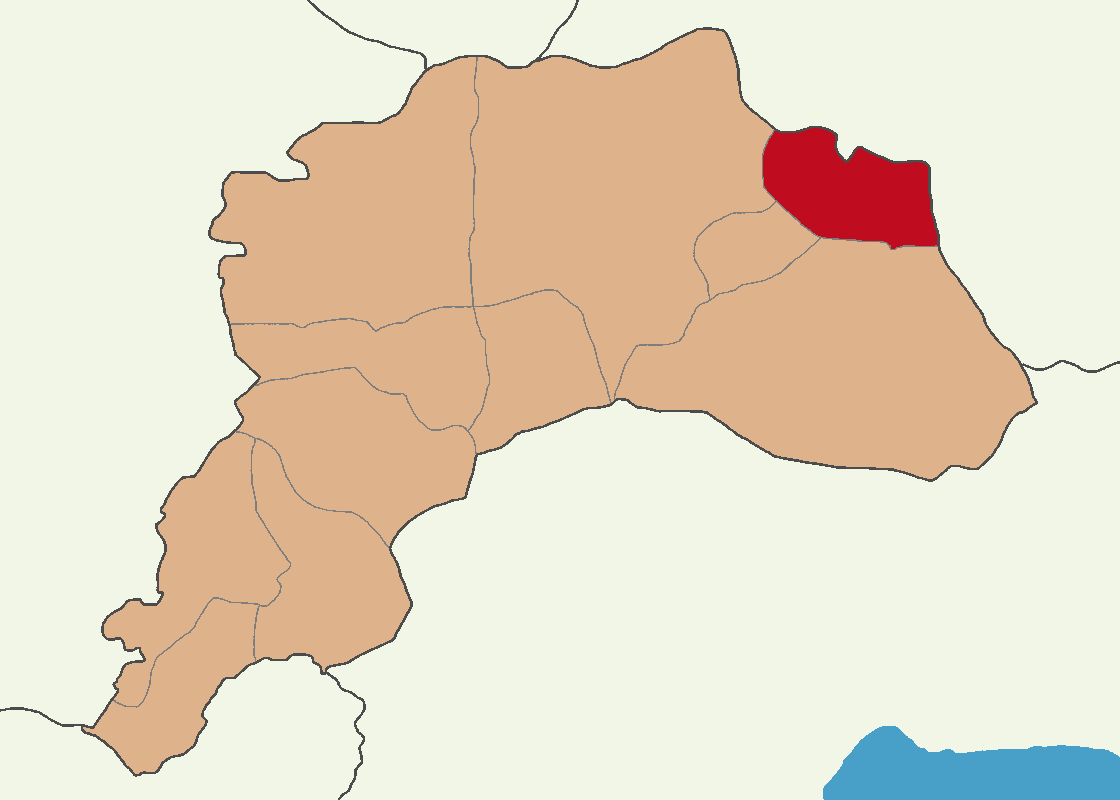
- Map showing Ağlasun District in Burdur Province

- Location in Turkey
- Coordinates: 37°39′N 30°32′E
- Country: Turkey
- Province: Burdur
- Seat: Ağlasun

Government
  - Kaymakam: Tahir Demir
- Area: 305 km^{2} (118 sq mi)
- Population (2024): 7,552
  - Density: 24.8/km^{2} (64.1/sq mi)
- Time zone: UTC+3 (TRT)
- Website: www.aglasun.gov.tr

Ağlasun District is a district of the Burdur Province of Turkey. Its seat is the town of Ağlasun. Its area is 305 km^{2}, and its population is 7,652 (2021).

== Composition ==
There is one municipality in Ağlasun District:

- Ağlasun

There are 9 villages in Ağlasun District:

- Aşağıyumrutaş
- Çamlıdere
- Dereköy
- Hisarköy
- Kiprit
- Mamak
- Yazır
- Yeşilbaşköy
- Yumrutaş
