= Dutluca, Burhaniye =

Village in Turkey

Dutluca
- Neighbourhood
- Country: Turkey
- Province: Balıkesir
- District: Burhaniye
- Population (2022): 301
- Time zone: UTC+3 (TRT)

Dutluca is a neighbourhood in the municipality and district of Burhaniye, Balıkesir Province in Turkey. Its population is 301 (2022).
