= Hacıbozlar, Burhaniye =

Village in Turkey

Hacıbozlar
- Neighbourhood
- Location in Turkey Hacıbozlar (Marmara)
- Coordinates: 39°19′29″N 27°00′40″E
- Country: Turkey
- Province: Balıkesir
- District: Burhaniye
- Population (2022): 183
- Time zone: UTC+3 (TRT)

Hacıbozlar is a neighbourhood in the municipality and district of Burhaniye, Balıkesir Province in Turkey. Its population is 183 (2022).
