= Çamlıdere, Ağlasun =

Village in Turkey

Çamlıdere
- Village
- Country: Turkey
- Province: Burdur
- District: Ağlasun
- Population (2021): 201
- Time zone: UTC+3 (TRT)

Çamlıdere is a village in the Ağlasun District of Burdur Province in Turkey. Its population is 201 (2021).
