= Aşağıyumrutaş, Ağlasun =

Village in Turkey

Aşağıyumrutaş
- Village
- Location in Turkey
- Coordinates: 37.5788°N 30.7299°E
- Country: Turkey
- Province: Burdur
- District: Ağlasun
- Population (2021): 111
- Time zone: UTC+3 (TRT)

Aşağıyumrutaş is a village in the Ağlasun District of Burdur Province in Turkey. Its population is 111 (2021).
