= Bahadınlı, Burhaniye =

Village in Turkey

Bahadınlı
- Neighbourhood
- Location in Turkey Bahadınlı (Marmara)
- Coordinates: 39°27′02″N 27°01′09″E
- Country: Turkey
- Province: Balıkesir
- District: Burhaniye
- Population (2022): 596
- Time zone: UTC+3 (TRT)

Bahadınlı is a neighbourhood in the municipality and district of Burhaniye, Balıkesir Province in Turkey. Its population is 596 (2022).
