= Ağacık, Burhaniye =

Village in Turkey

Ağacık
- Neighbourhood
- Location in Turkey Ağacık (Marmara)
- Coordinates: 39.4076°N 26.9338°E
- Country: Turkey
- Province: Balıkesir
- District: Burhaniye
- Population (2022): 185
- Time zone: UTC+3 (TRT)

Ağacık is a neighbourhood in the municipality and district of Burhaniye, Balıkesir Province in Turkey. Its population is 185 (2022).
