= Avunduk, Burhaniye =

Village in Turkey

Avunduk
- Neighbourhood
- Location in Turkey Avunduk (Marmara)
- Coordinates: 39.4135°N 27.0334°E
- Country: Turkey
- Province: Balıkesir
- District: Burhaniye
- Population (2022): 45
- Time zone: UTC+3 (TRT)

Avunduk is a neighbourhood in the municipality and district of Burhaniye, Balıkesir Province in Turkey. Its population is 45 (2022).
