= Kuyucak, Burhaniye =

Village in Turkey

Kuyucak
- Neighbourhood
- Country: Turkey
- Province: Balıkesir
- District: Burhaniye
- Population (2022): 38
- Time zone: UTC+3 (TRT)

Kuyucak is a neighbourhood in the municipality and district of Burhaniye, Balıkesir Province in Turkey. Its population is 38 (2022).
