= Sagalassos =

Ancient city and tentative UNESCO World Heritage Site

- Σαγαλασσός (Greek)
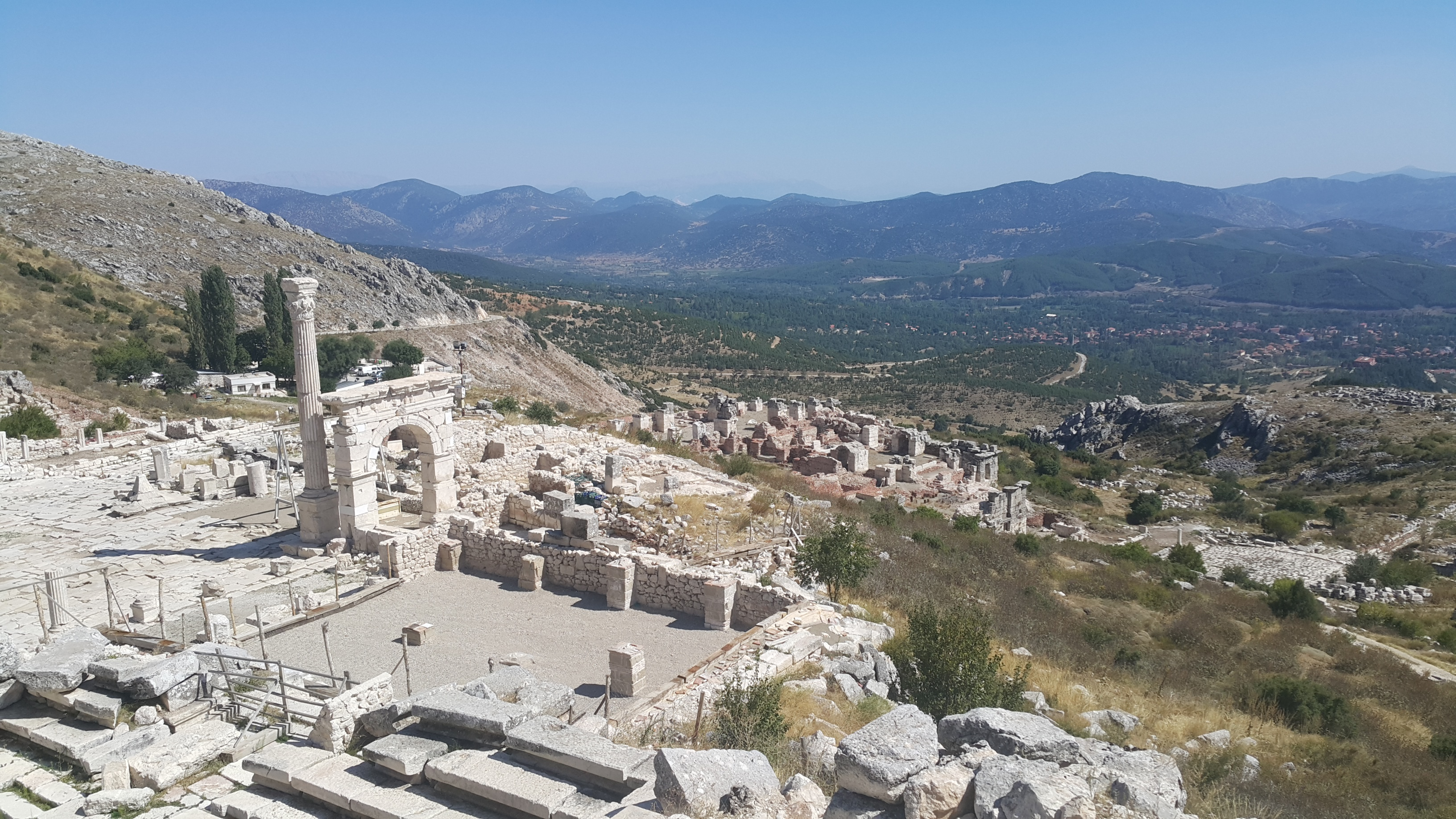

- Location within Turkey
- 37°40′41″N 30°31′10″E
- Type: Settlement
- Location: Ağlasun, Burdur Province, Turkey
- Region: Pisidia

History
- Abandoned: Middle of the seventh century CE

Site notes
- Excavation dates: 1990–present
- Archaeologists: Marc Waelkens

Sagalassos (Greek: Σαγαλασσός), also known as Selgessos (Greek: Σελγησσός) and Sagallesos (Greek: Σαγαλλησός), is an archaeological site in southwestern Turkey, about 100 km north of Antalya (ancient Attaleia) and 30 km from Burdur and Isparta. The ancient ruins of Sagalassos are 7 km from Ağlasun (as well as being its namesake) in the province of Burdur, on Mount Akdağ, in the Western Taurus Mountains range, at an altitude of 1450–1700 metres. In Roman Imperial times, the town was known as the "first city of Pisidia", a region in the western Taurus Mountains, currently known as the Turkish Lakes Region. During the Hellenistic period it was already one of the major Pisidian towns.

== Introduction ==
The urban site was laid out on various terraces at an altitude between 1400 and 1600 m. After suffering from a major earthquake in the early sixth century CE, the town managed to recover, but a combination of epidemics, water shortages, a general lack of security and stability, a failing economy and finally another devastating earthquake around the middle of the seventh century forced the inhabitants to abandon their town and resettle in the valley.

Large-scale excavations started in 1990 under the direction of Marc Waelkens of the Katholieke Universiteit Leuven. A large number of buildings, monuments and other archaeological remains have been exposed, documenting the monumental aspect of the Hellenistic, Roman and early Byzantine history of this town.

== History ==
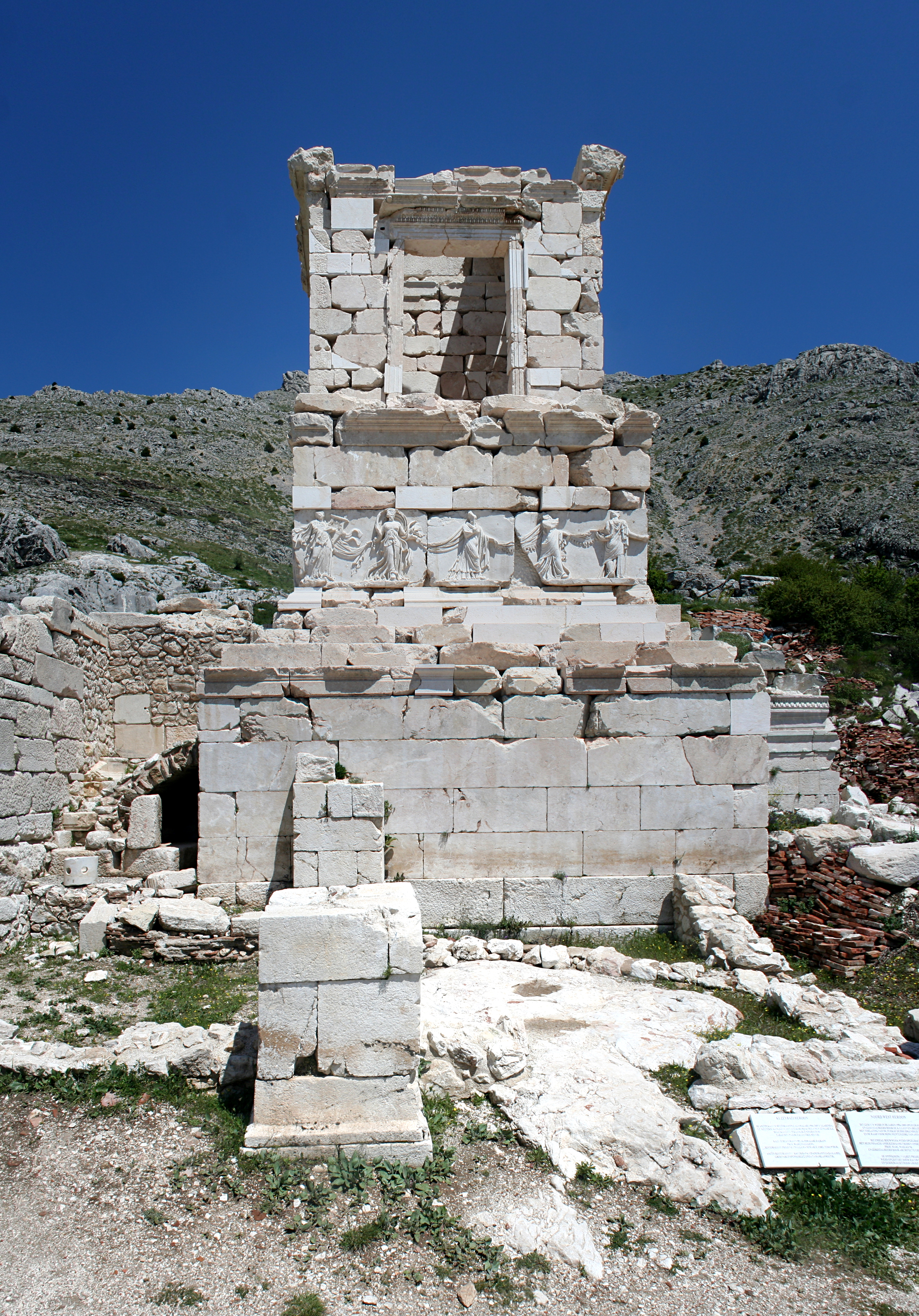
Heroön in the northwest sector

Human settlement in the area goes back to 8000 BCE, before the actual site was occupied. Hittite documents refer to a mountain site of Salawassa in the fourteenth century BCE and the town spread during the Phrygian and Lydian cultures. Sagalassos was part of the region of Pisidia in the western part of the Taurus Mountains. During the Persian period, Pisidia became known for its warlike factions.

Sagalassos was one of the wealthiest cities in Pisidia when Alexander the Great conquered it in 333 BCE on his way to Persia. It had a population of a few thousand. After Alexander's death, the region became part of the territories of Antigonus Monophthalmus, possibly Lysimachus of Thrace, the Seleucids of Syria and the Attalids of Pergamon. The archeological record indicates that locals rapidly adopted Hellenic culture.

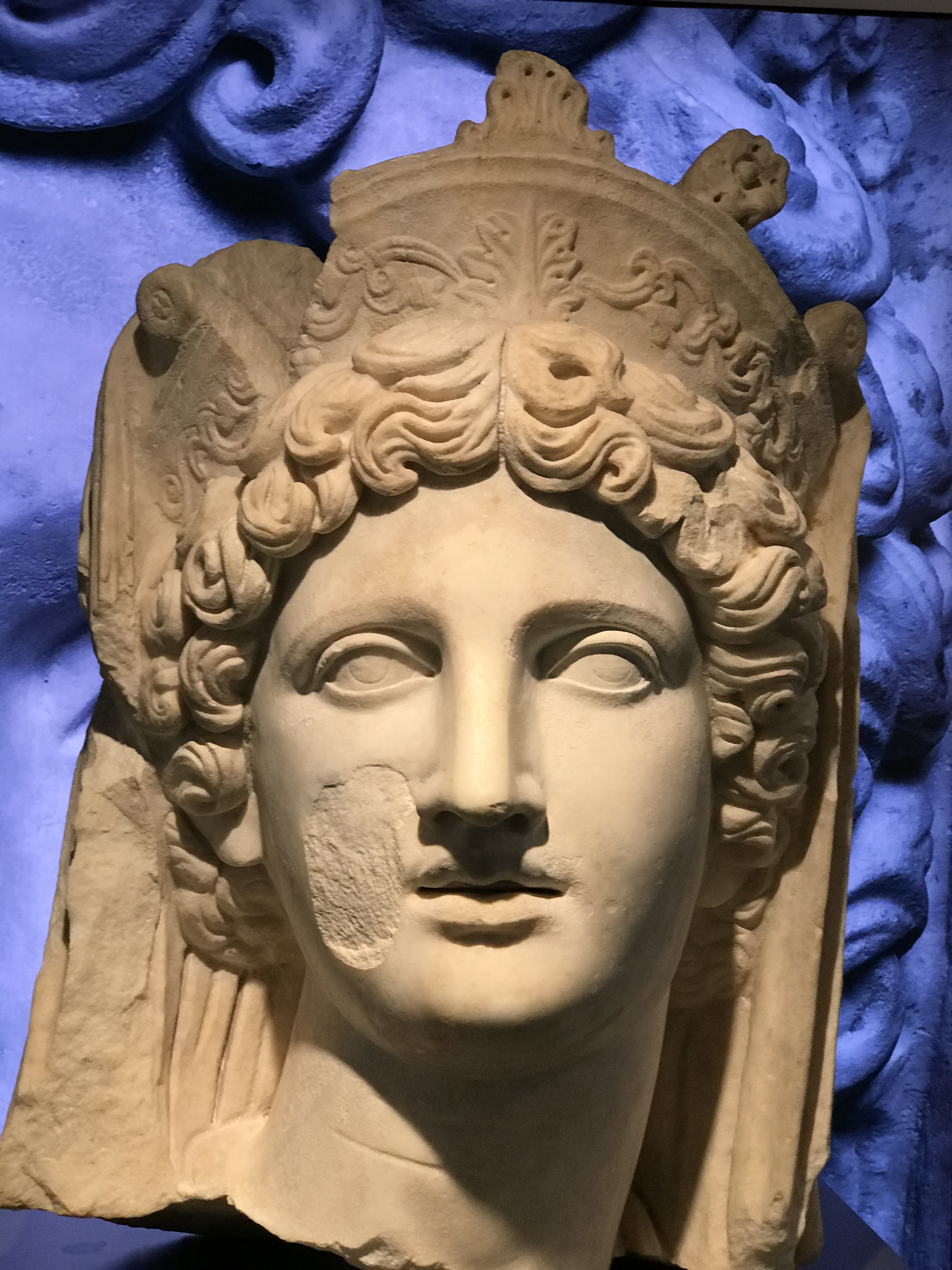
Head of Demeter, Roman Imperial period, 2nd century CE

The Roman Empire absorbed Pisidia after the Attalids and it became part of the province of Asia. In 39 BCE it was handed out to Galatian client king Amyntas, but after he was killed in 25 BCE Rome turned Pisidia into the province of Galatia. Under the Roman Empire, Sagalassos became the important urban center of Pisidia, particularly favoured by the Emperor Hadrian, who named it the "first city" of the province and the center of the imperial cult. Contemporary buildings have a fully Roman character.

Around 400 CE Sagalassos was fortified for defence. An earthquake devastated it in 518, causing damage to some buildings that the inhabitants attempted to repair, and a plague circa 541–543 halved the local population. Arab raids threatened the town around 640 and after another earthquake destroyed the town in the middle of the seventh century, the site was abandoned. The populace probably resettled in the valley. Excavations have found only signs of a fortified monastery—possibly a religious community, continuing as a bishopric, which was destroyed in the twelfth century. Sagalassos disappeared from the records.

In the following centuries, erosion covered the ruins of Sagalassos. It was not looted to a significant extent, possibly because of its location.

Explorer Paul Lucas, who was traveling in Turkey on a mission for the court of Louis XIV of France, visited the ruins in 1706. After 1824, when Francis Vyvyan Jago Arundell (1780–1846), the British chaplain at Smyrna and an antiquarian, visited the site and deciphered its name in inscriptions, Western travelers began to visit the ruins. Polish historian of art, count K. Lanckoroński produced the first map of Sagalassos. However, the city did not attract much archaeological attention until 1985, when an Anglo-Belgian team led by Stephen Mitchell began a major survey of the site.

== Modern project ==
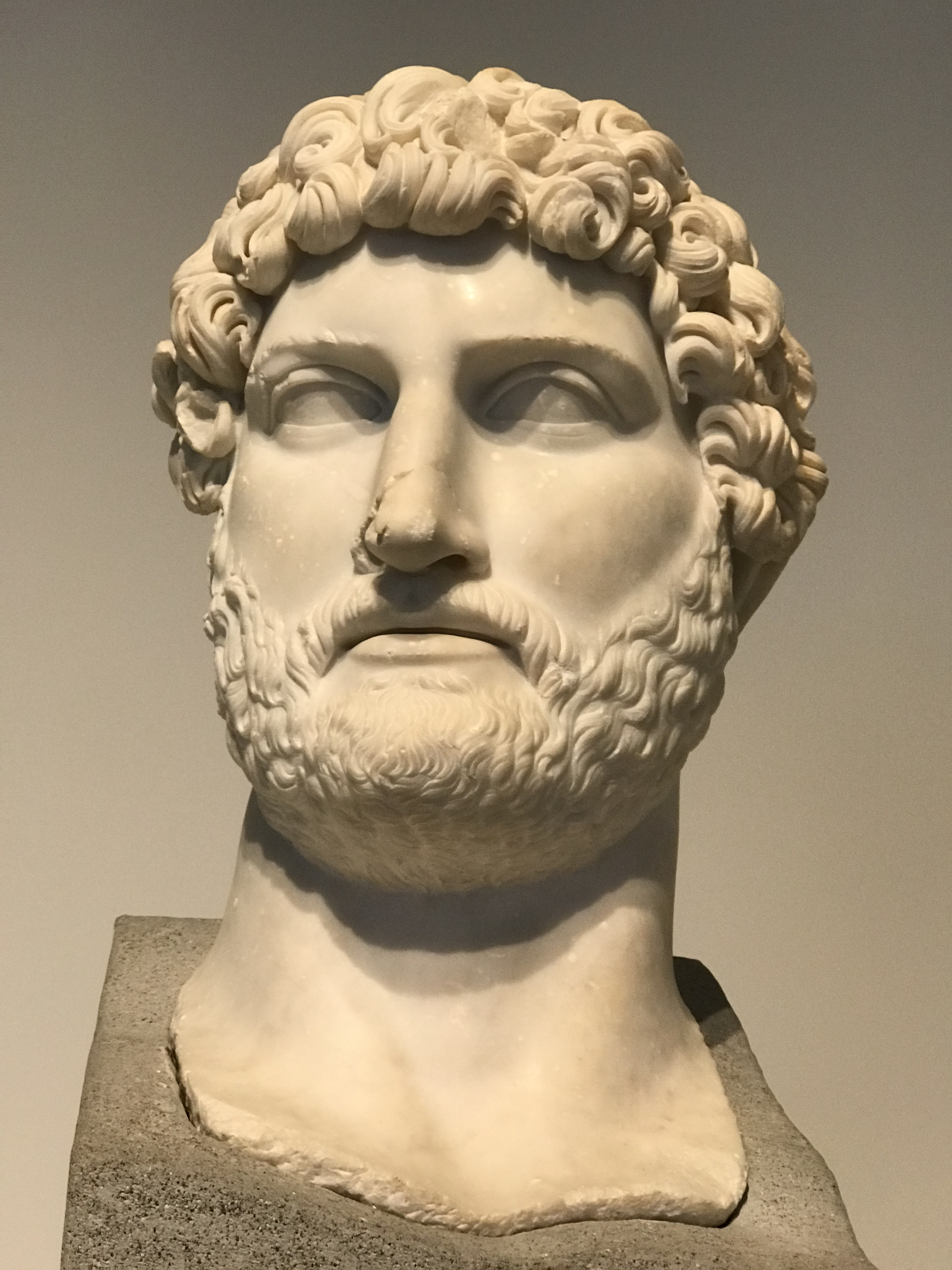
Head of the colossal statue of Emperor Hadrian, found at the Roman Baths complex and exhibited at the Burdur Archaeological Museum - temporarily on display at Istanbul International Airport Museum (IST)

From 1990 Sagalassos, a major tourist site, has become a major excavation project led by Marc Waelkens of the Catholic University of Leuven in Belgium. The monumental city center is now exposed; four major restoration projects are (nearly) completed. The project also undertakes an intensive urban and geophysical survey, excavations in the domestic and industrial areas, and an intensive survey of the territory. The first survey documents a thousand years of occupation—from Alexander the Great to the seventh century—while the latter has established the changing settlement patterns, the vegetation history and farming practices, the landscape formation and climatic changes during the last 10,000 years.

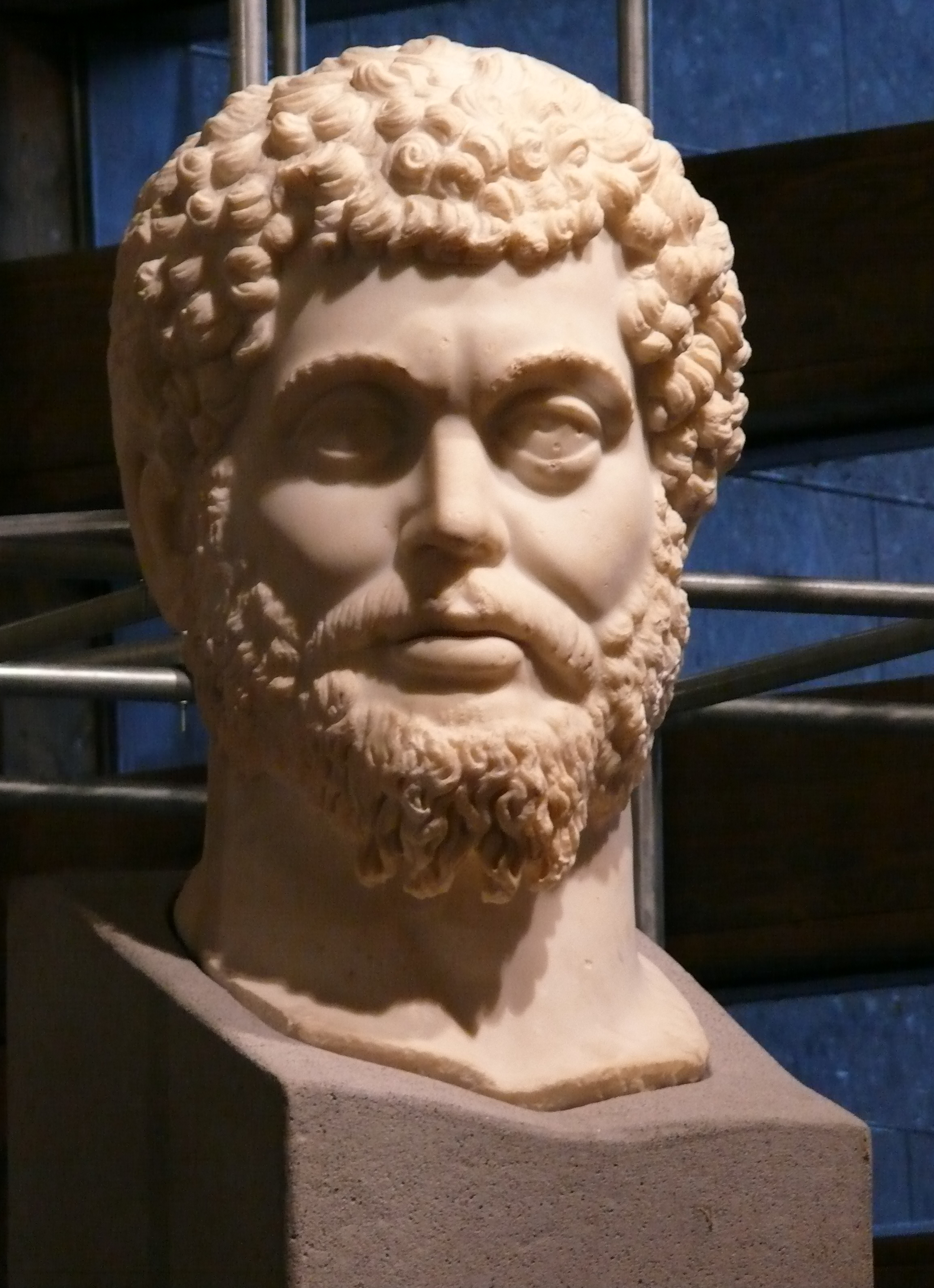
Portrait of Emperor Marcus Aurelius

On 9 August 2007, the press reported the discovery of a finely detailed, colossal statue of the Emperor Hadrian, which is thought to have stood 4–5m in height. The statue dates to the early part of Hadrian's reign, and depicts the emperor in military garb. It was carved in sections that were fitted together with marble tenons on the site, which was a thermae, a public bath. A major earthquake sometime between the late sixth and early seventh centuries CE brought the vaulting crashing down; the statue was felled, coming apart along the joins of its facture. The discovery of carved marble toes drilled with dowel holes to fasten them to the hem of a long mantle suggests the possibility of finding a companion sculpture of Sabina, the emperor's consort. On 14 August 2008, the head statue of Faustina the Elder, wife of Roman emperor Antoninus Pius (Hadrian's successor and adopted son) was discovered in the same site. On 22 August 2008, another colossal portrait head was found, this time of Marcus Aurelius.

A study involving mitochondrial analysis of a Byzantine-era population, whose samples were gathered from excavations in the archaeological site of Sagalassos, found that Sagalassos samples were closest to modern samples from Greek / Balkan and Persian and Italy."

== Exhibitions ==
- "Hadrian: Empire and Conflict", an exhibition that ran at the British Museum of London in 2008.
- The Gallo-Roman Museum in Tongeren, Belgium hosted an exhibition of artefacts from Sagalassos under the title "Sagalassos: City of Dreams" between 29 October 2011 and 17 June 2012

== Gallery ==
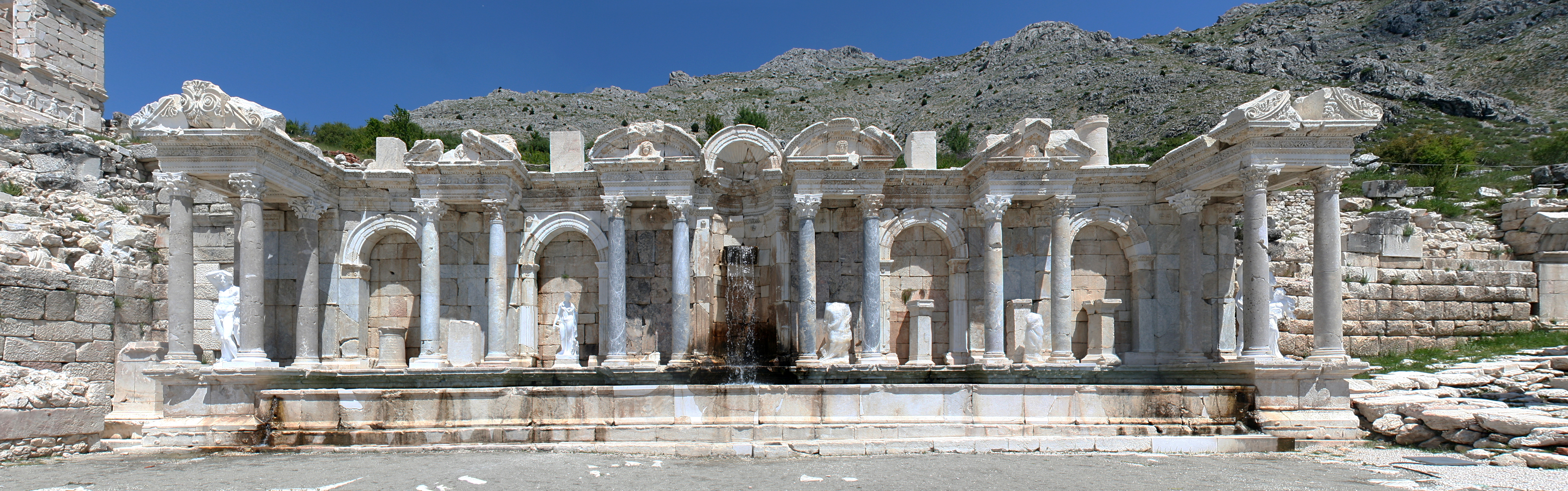
Nymphaeum of Antoninus Pius

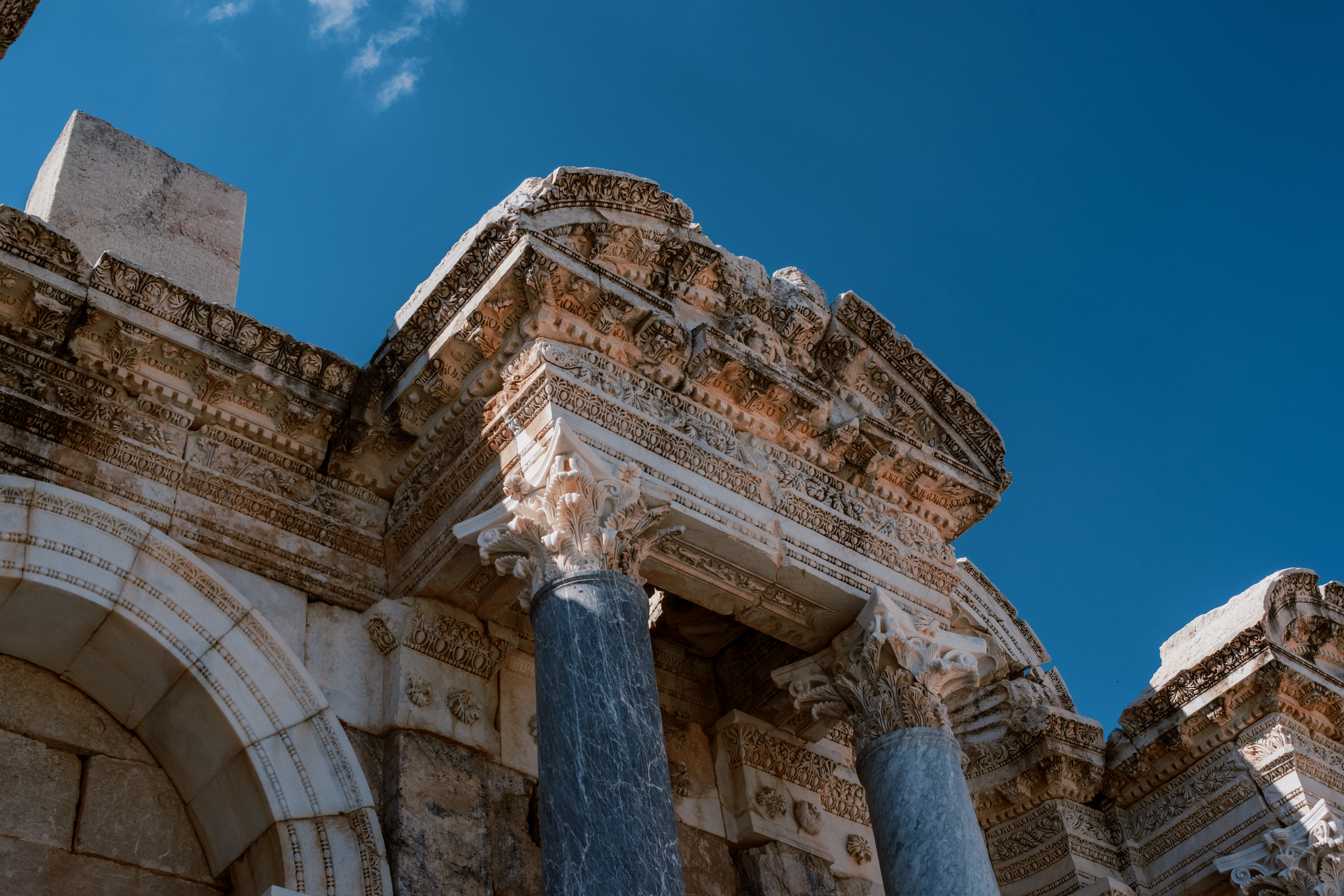
Detail of the Nymphaeum of Antoninus Pius

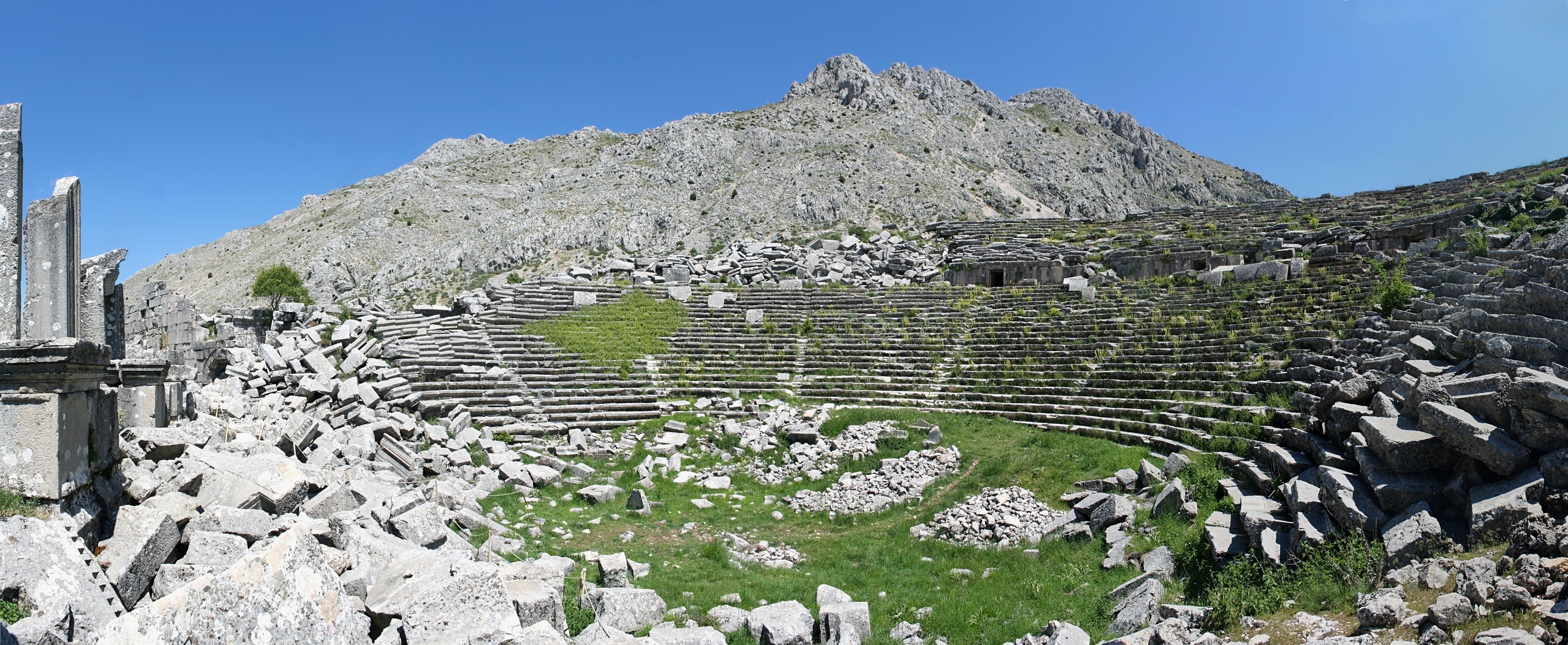
Ancient Roman theatre

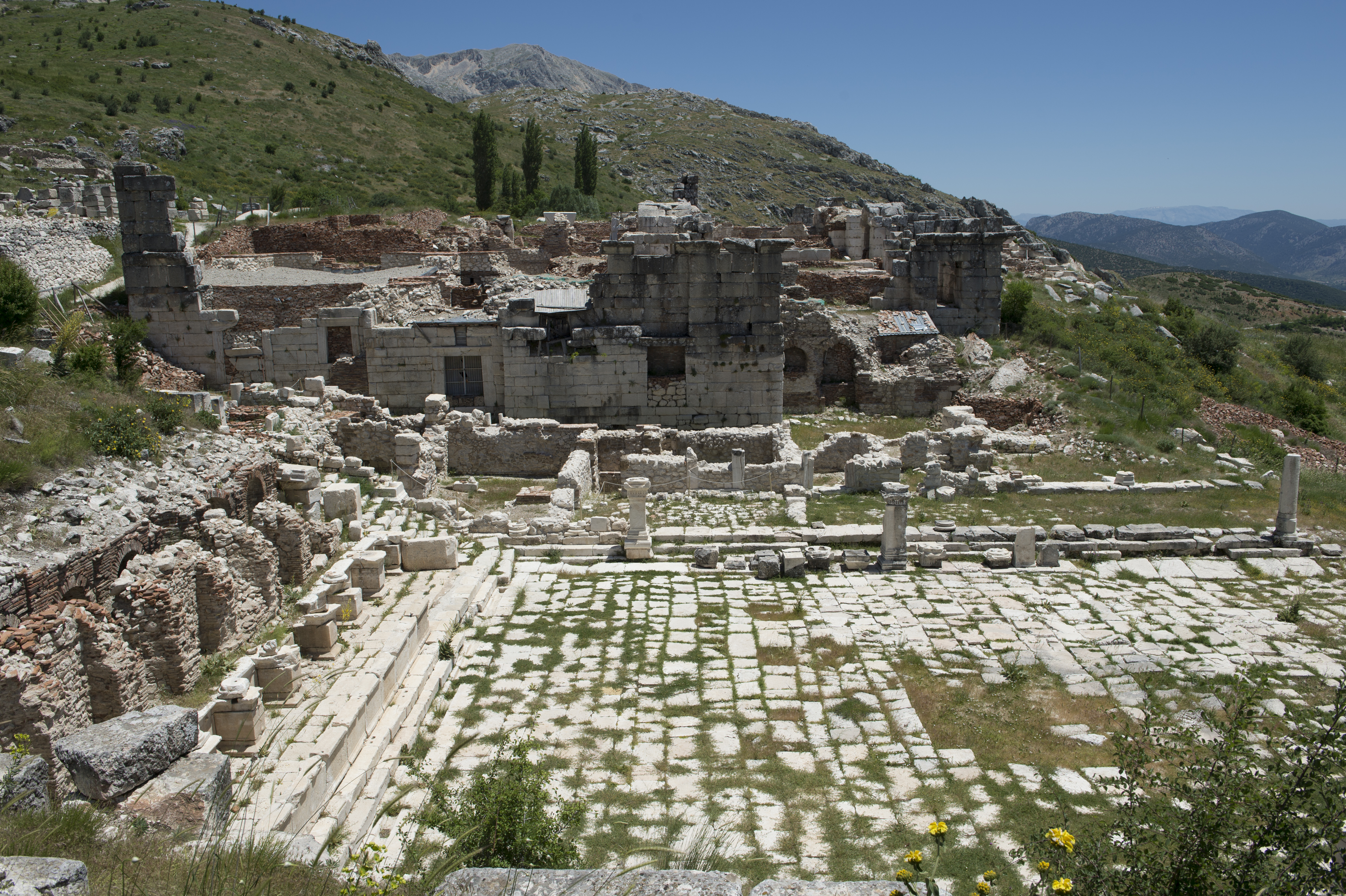
Lower Agora

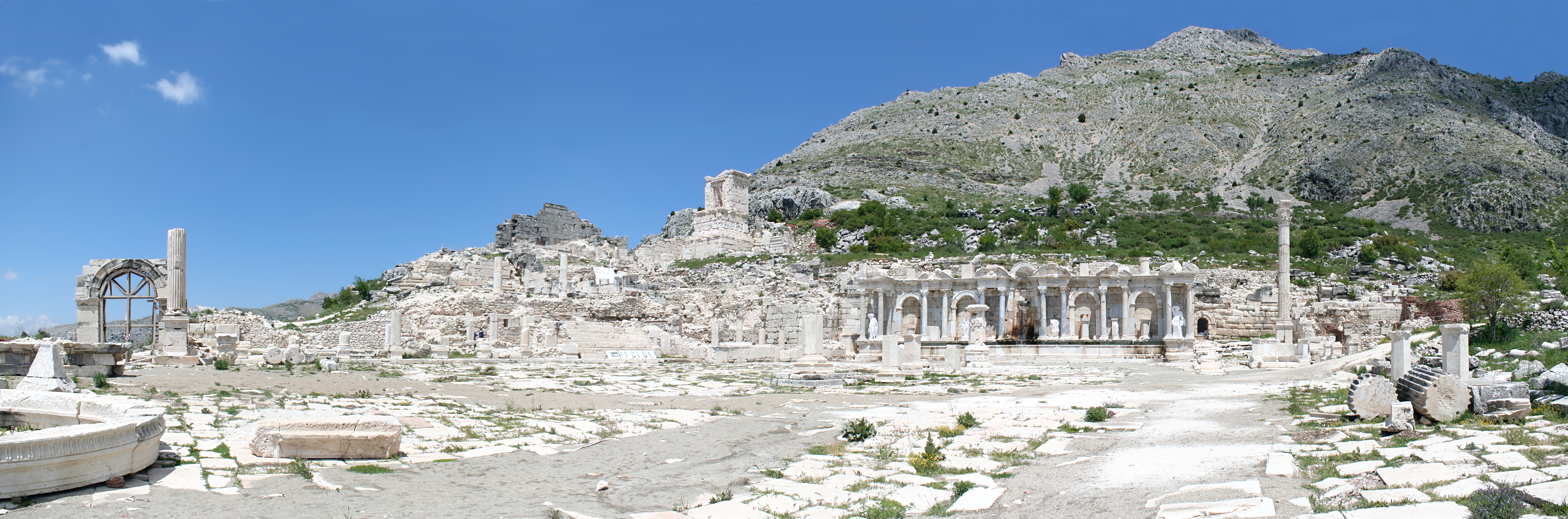
Upper Agora

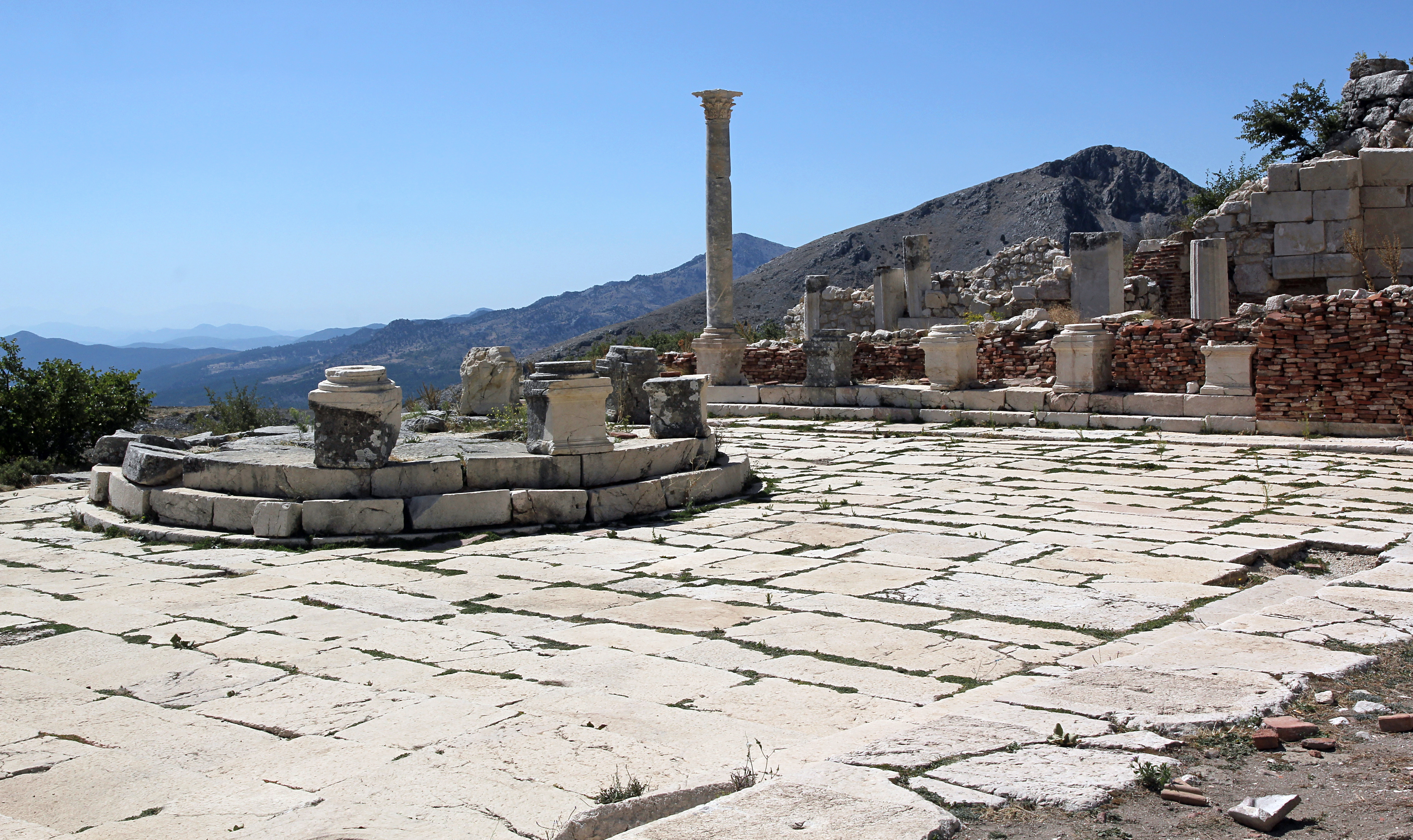
Macellum with tholos

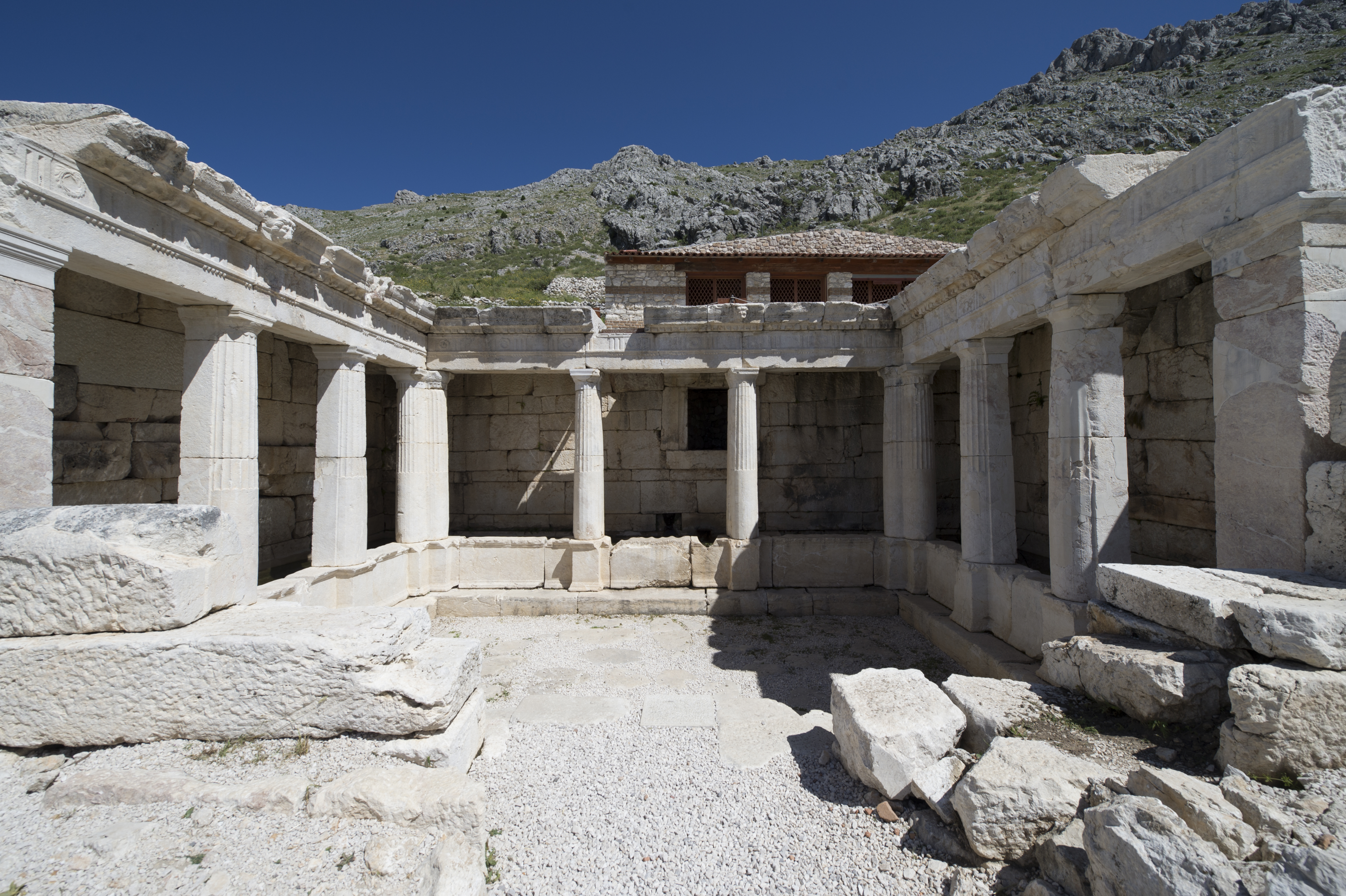
Sagalassos Fountain House

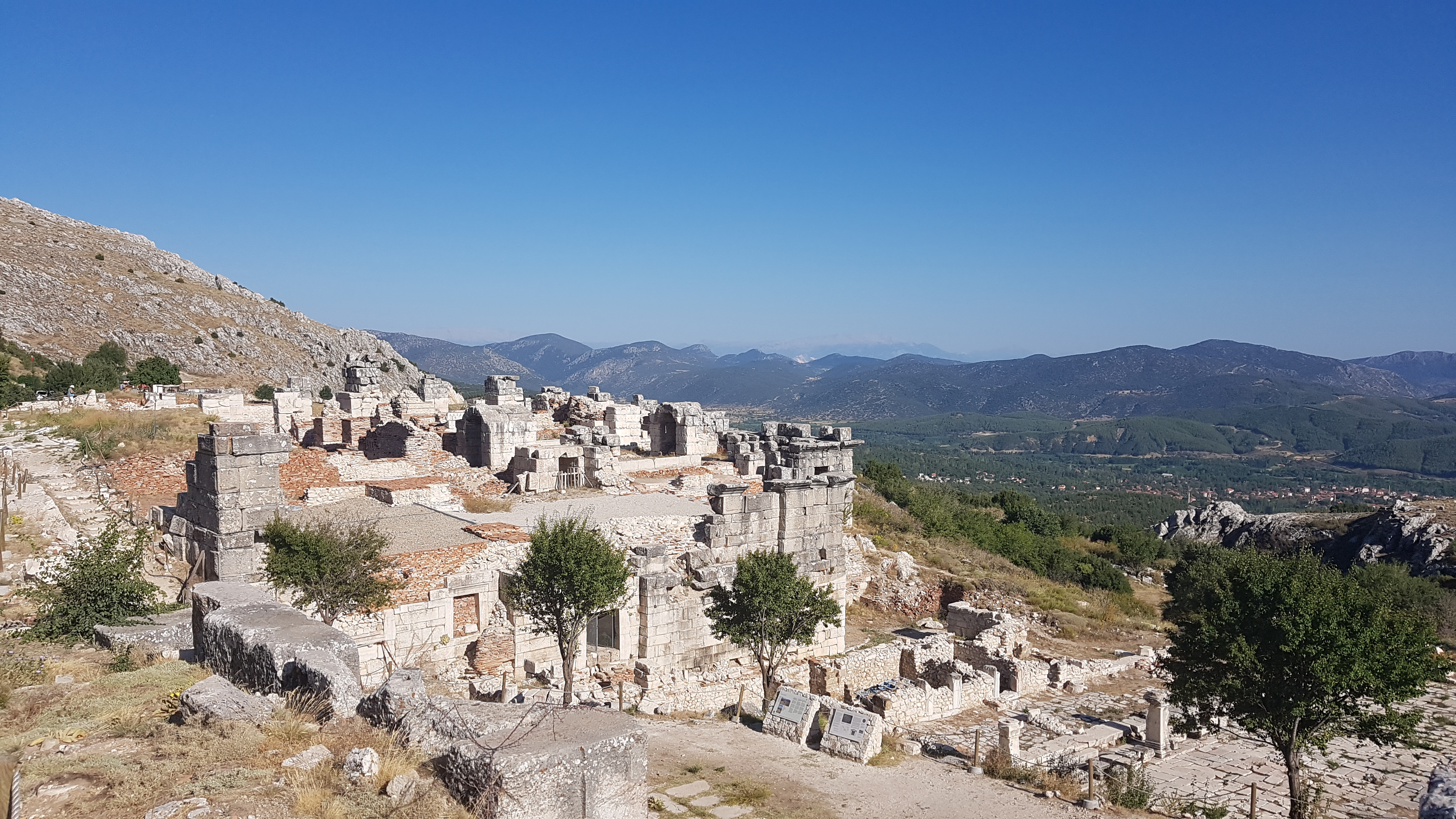
Imperial Baths

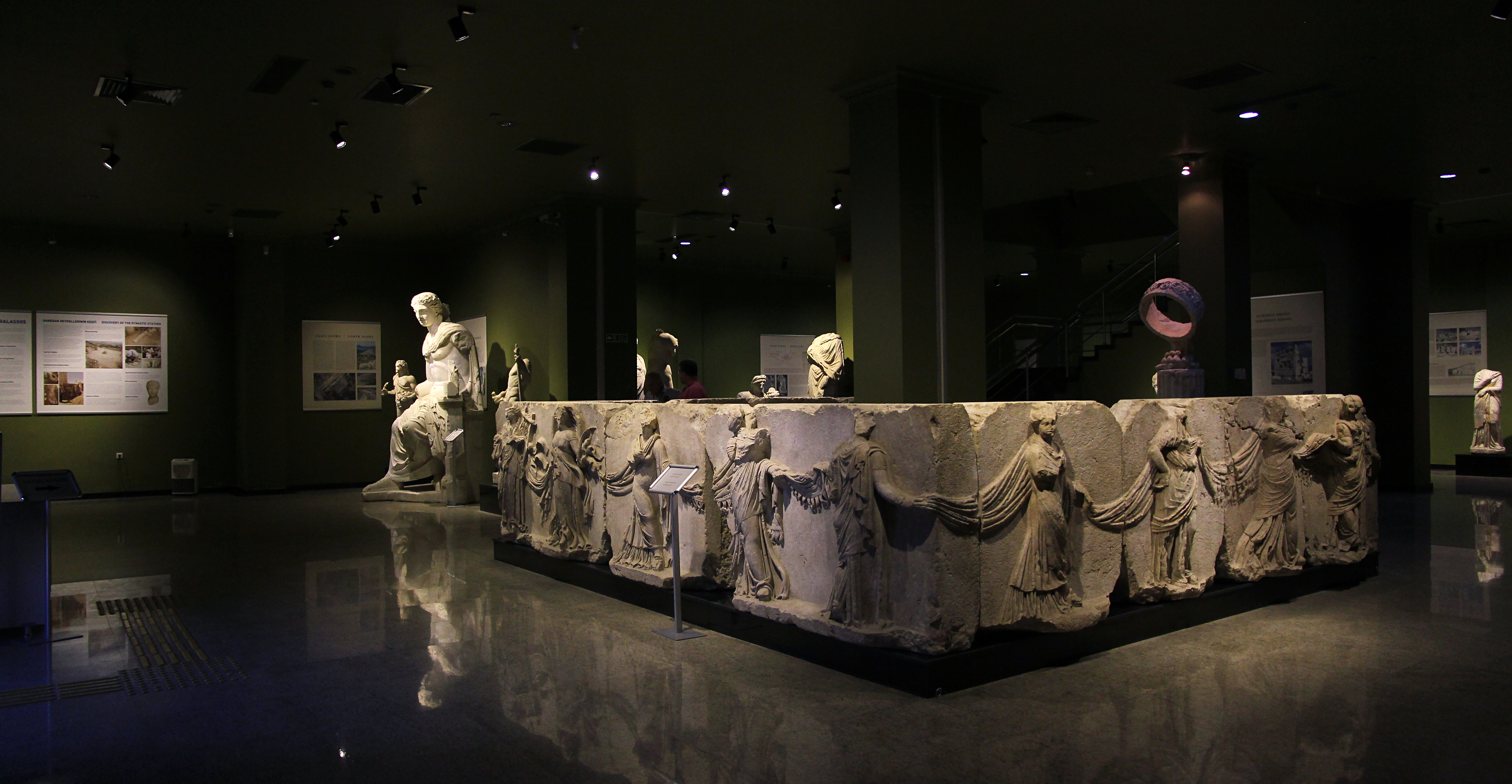
Burdur Archaeological Museum
