= Yunuslar, Burhaniye =

Village in Turkey

Yunuslar
- Neighbourhood
- Location in Turkey Yunuslar (Marmara)
- Coordinates: 39°23′20″N 26°56′45″E
- Country: Turkey
- Province: Balıkesir
- District: Burhaniye
- Population (2022): 143
- Time zone: UTC+3 (TRT)
- Postal code: 10702
- Area code: 0266

Yunuslar is a neighbourhood in the municipality and district of Burhaniye, Balıkesir Province in Turkey. Its population is 143 (2022).

== History ==
While Yunuslar used to belong to Gömeç district, it was transferred to Burhaniye district with the decision of the Ministry of Interior on 31 December 1991.
