= Hisarköy, Burhaniye =

Village in Turkey

Hisarköy
- Neighbourhood
- Country: Turkey
- Province: Balıkesir
- District: Burhaniye
- Population (2022): 173
- Time zone: UTC+3 (TRT)

Hisarköy is a neighbourhood in the municipality and district of Burhaniye, Balıkesir Province in Turkey. Its population is 173 (2022).
