= Damlalı, Burhaniye =

Village in Turkey

Damlalı
- Neighbourhood
- Country: Turkey
- Province: Balıkesir
- District: Burhaniye
- Population (2022): 122
- Time zone: UTC+3 (TRT)

Damlalı is a neighbourhood in the Burhaniye municipality and district of Balıkesir Province, Turkey. Its population was 122 in 2022.
