= Çallı, Burhaniye =

Village in Turkey

Çallı
- Neighbourhood
- Location in Turkey Çallı (Marmara)
- Coordinates: 39.4704°N 27.0487°E
- Country: Turkey
- Province: Balıkesir
- District: Burhaniye
- Population (2022): 17
- Time zone: UTC+3 (TRT)

Çallı is a neighbourhood in the municipality and district of Burhaniye, Balıkesir Province in Turkey. Its population is 17 (2022).
