= Yumrutaş, Ağlasun =

Village in Turkey

Yumrutaş
- Village
- Location in Turkey
- Coordinates: 37.59915°N 30.67689°E
- Country: Turkey
- Province: Burdur
- District: Ağlasun
- Population (2021): 112
- Time zone: UTC+3 (TRT)

Yumrutaş is a village in the Ağlasun District of Burdur Province in Turkey. Its population is 112 (2021).
