= Pelitköy =

Pelitköy Zeytinpınar
- Neighbourhood
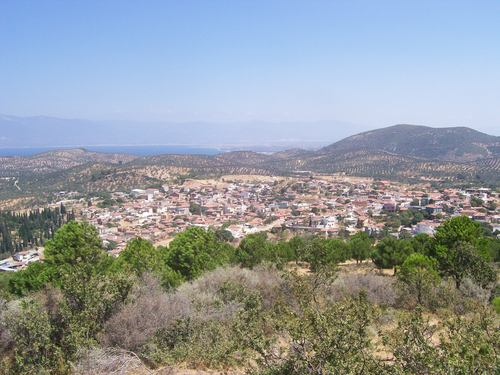

- Location within Turkey Location within Marmara
- Coordinates: 39°26′43″N 26°54′0″E
- Country: Turkey
- Province: Balıkesir
- District: Burhaniye
- Population (2022): 2,502
- Time zone: UTC+3 (TRT)

Pelitköy is a neighbourhood of the municipality and district of Burhaniye, Balıkesir Province, western Turkey. Its population is 2,502 (2022). Before the 2013 reorganisation, it was a town (belde). It is 2 km from Çanakkale-İzmir Way (E87). It is known for its beach, and its olives and olive products. Pelit means oak fruit in Turkish; its name translates as "oak fruit village".

== Geography ==
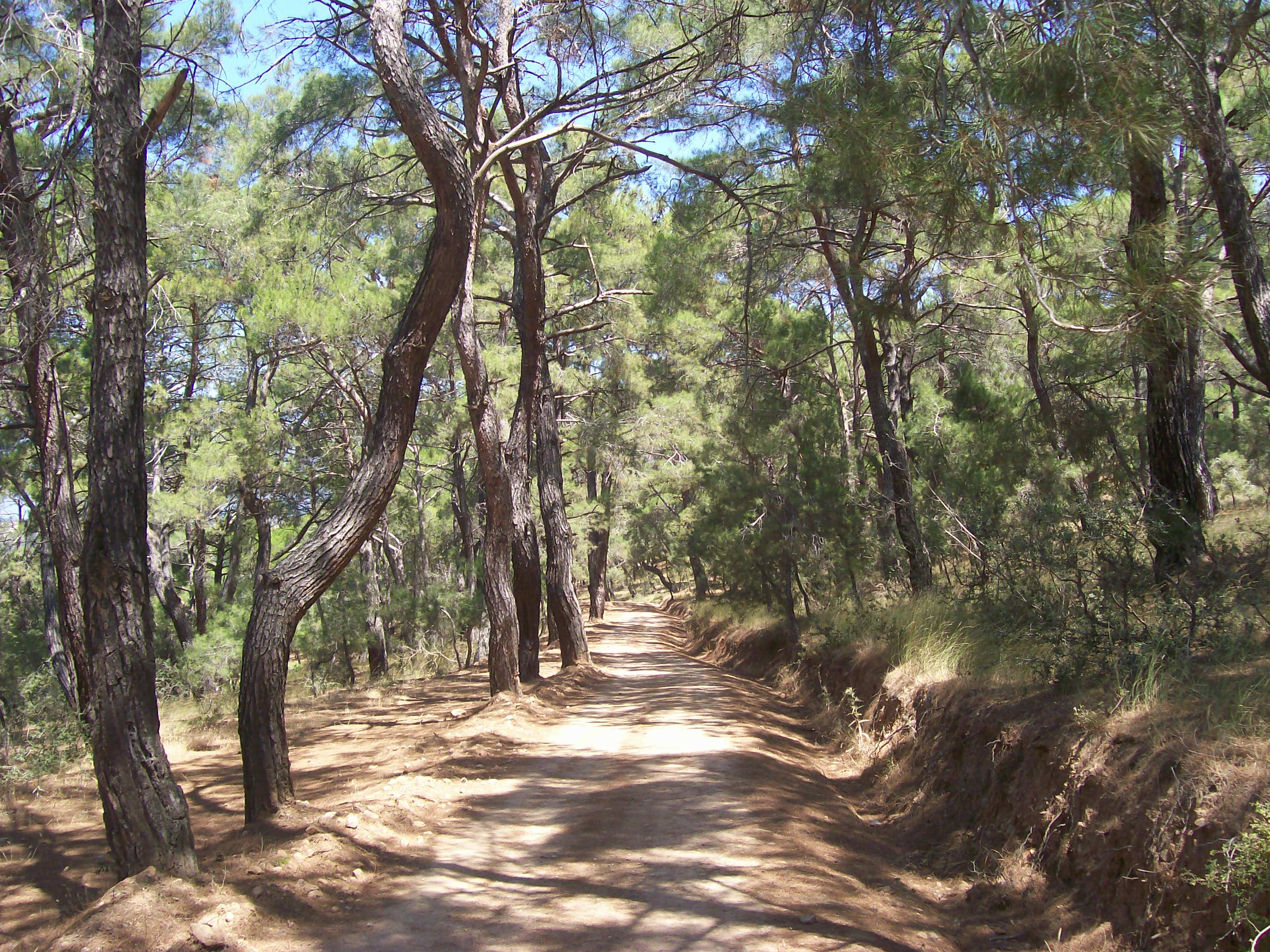
Çamlık, Pelitköy

Pelitköy is located on a cape, known as Bağlar Cape or Kum (Sand) Cape and is a summer resort. The climate is warm, with some seasonal snow and (rarely) rain. Winds can be strong, especially the north wind. A natural spring in İçmeler, Pelitköy, is believed to remedy stomach illnesses, but it is not currently in use.

== History ==
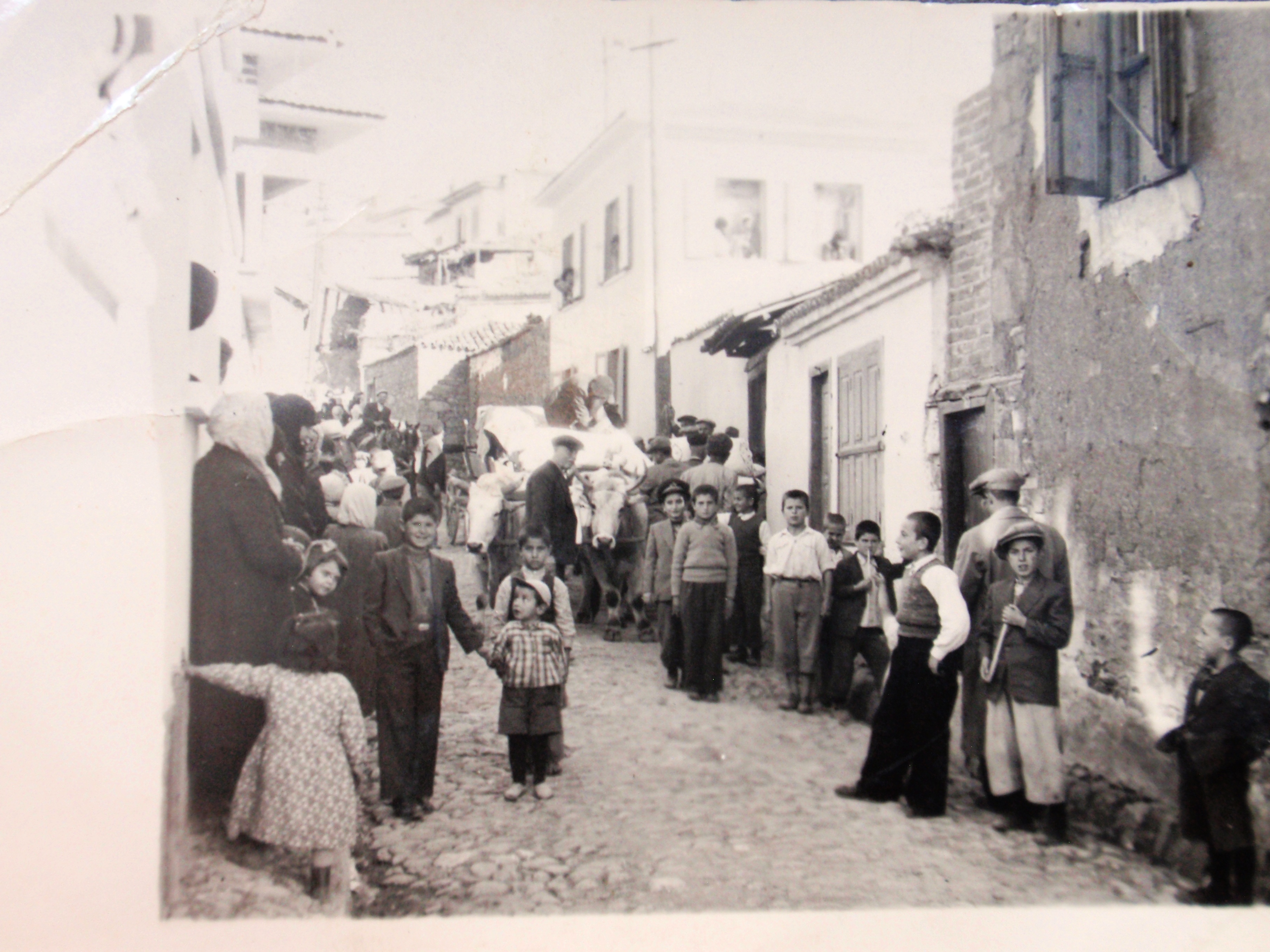
Mebus Mehmet Bey Street

Harmankayası cave and Pekmezkaya hill are ancient cult places in Pelitköy. Some historical objects which were found in Pelitköy are now on display in Burhaniye Museum. Most of Pelitköy's people moved to Lesbos (Greece) after the Balkan Wars or in the Population exchange between Greece and Turkey in the early 1920s. Alevi, Romani, and Kurdish people also live in Pelitköy. There are ruins in the village common area and, near Çamlık, an old oil factory chimney.

== Culture ==
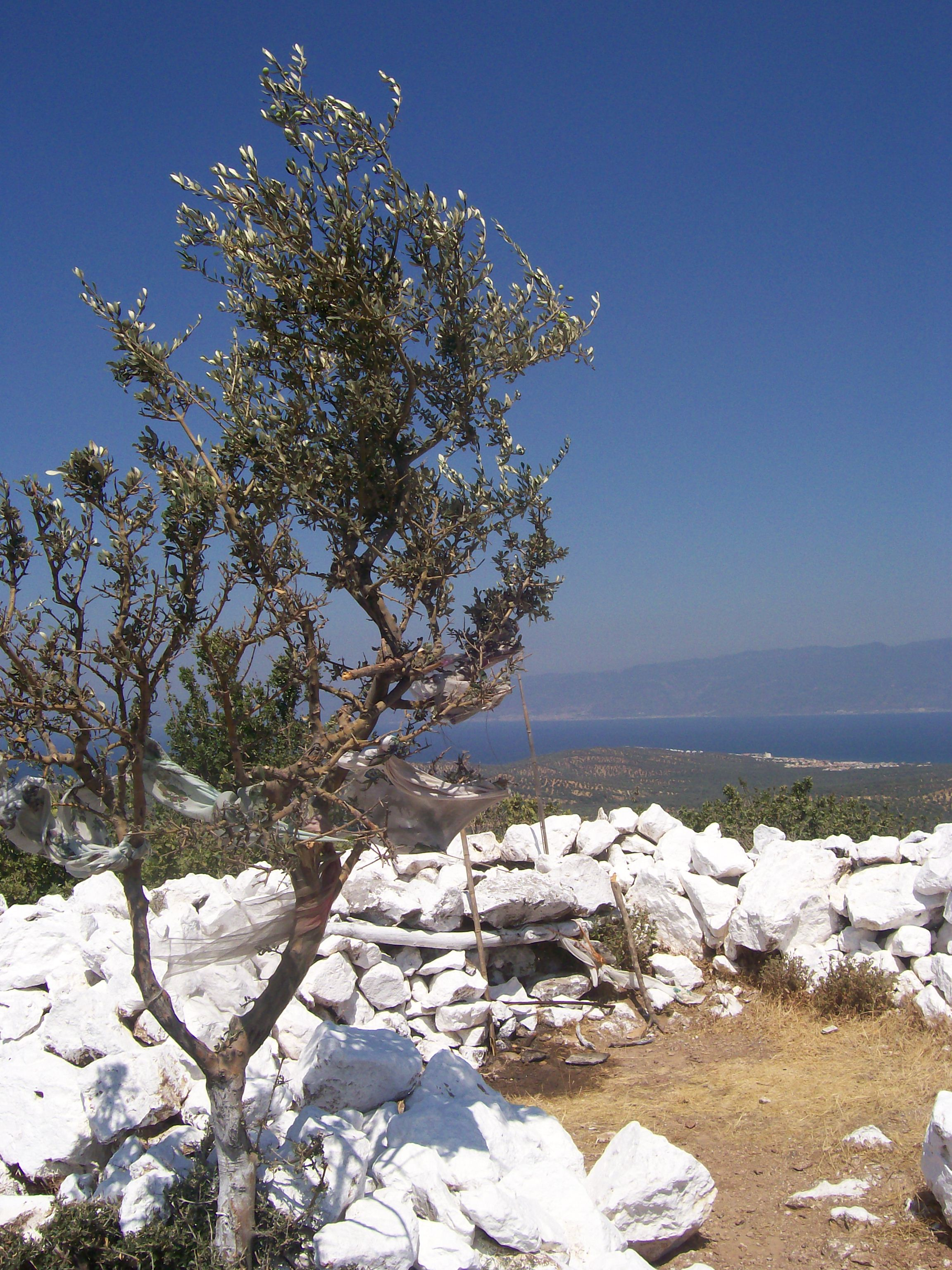
Alevi Tomb

Autumn in Pelitköy brings camel wrestling, and summer has the Pelitköy Olive Festival. People of the Alevi tribe visit their tomb on the top of Çamlık Hill every year.

== Economy ==
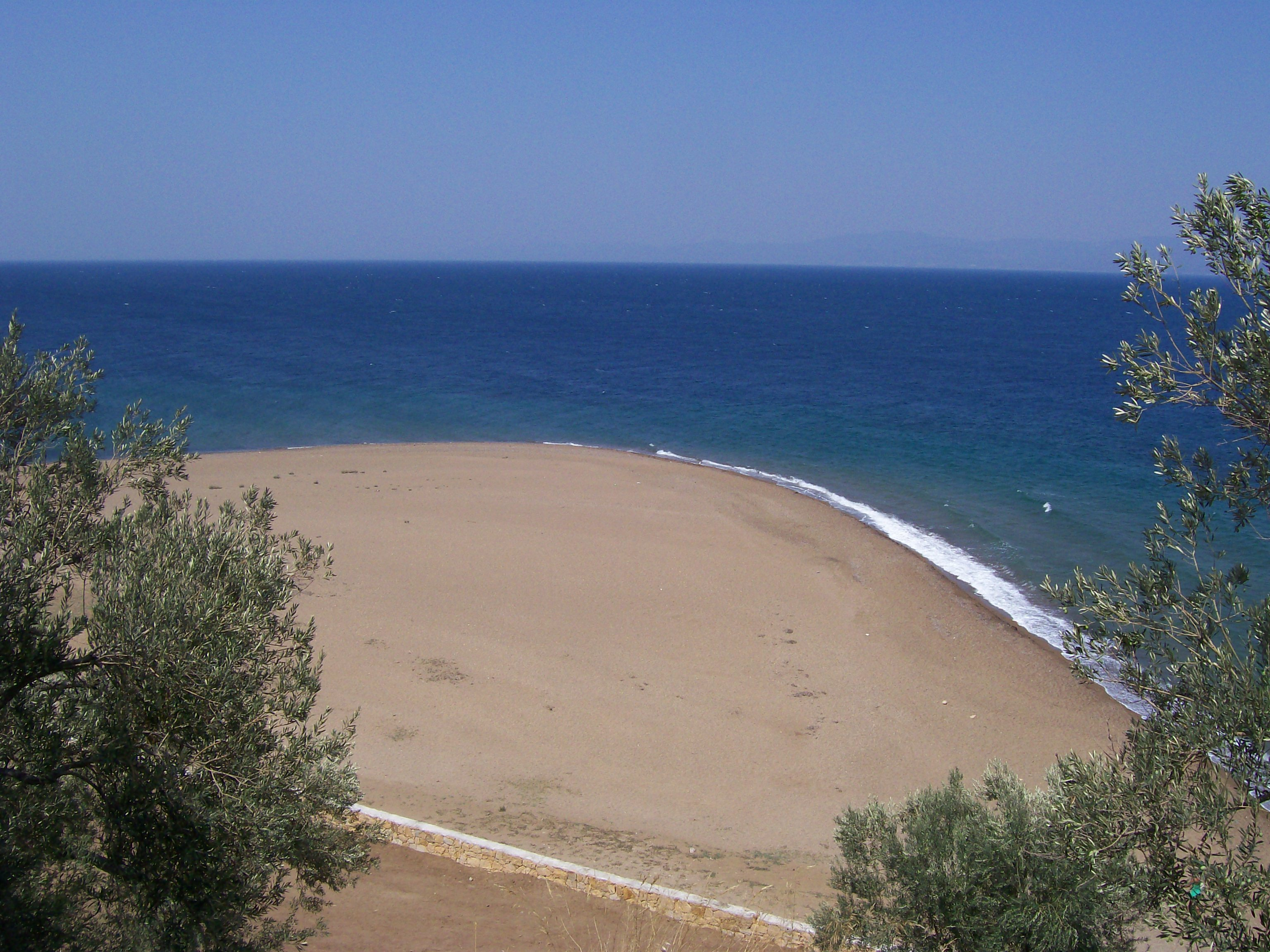
Kum Cape

The village's economy is primarily olive products, mostly olive oil, and tourism. There is a small ostrich farm in Pelitköy.
