= Hisarköy, Ağlasun =

Village in Turkey

Hisarköy
- Village
- Country: Turkey
- Province: Burdur
- District: Ağlasun
- Population (2021): 170
- Time zone: UTC+3 (TRT)

Hisarköy (also: Hisar) is a village in the Ağlasun District of Burdur Province in Turkey. Its population is 170 (2021).
