= Ağlasun =

- Municipality
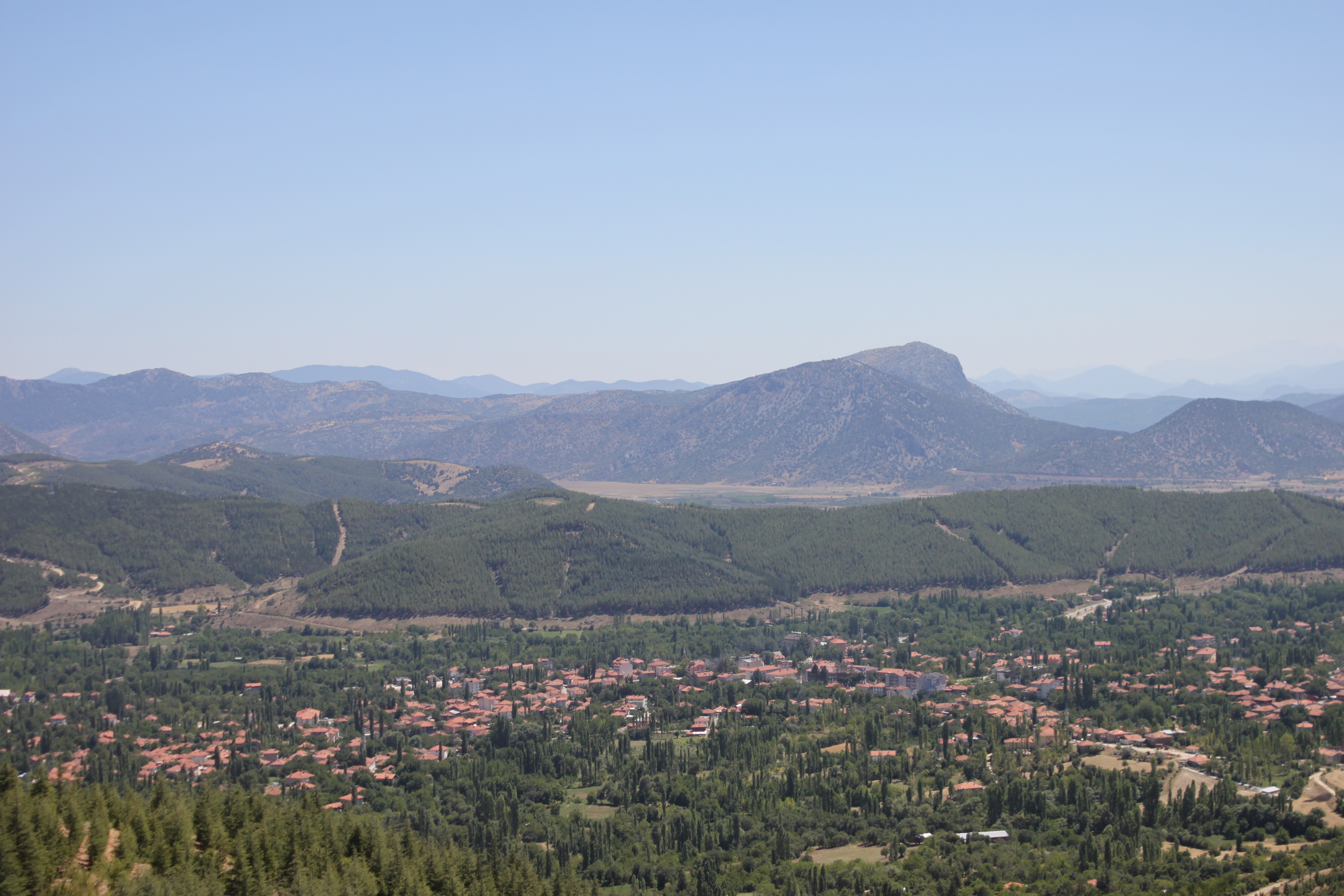
- View of Ağlasun from Sagalassos

- Location within Turkey
- Coordinates: 37°38′58″N 30°32′02″E
- Country: Turkey
- Province: Burdur
- District: Ağlasun

Government
  - Mayor: Ali Ulusoy (AKP)
- Population (2021): 3,645
- Time zone: UTC+3 (TRT)
- Postal code: 15500
- Website: www.aglasun.bel.tr

Ağlasun is a town in Burdur Province in the Mediterranean region of Turkey. It is the seat of Ağlasun District. Its population is 3,645 (2021). The mayor is Ali Ulusoy (AKP).

The town is 7 km from the ruins of the ancient city of Sagalassos, from which it gets its modern name.

Ağlasun is a member of the Norwich-based European Association of Historic Towns and Regions.

== See also ==
- Sagalassos
