= Erenköy, Çanakkale =

Erenköy İntepe
- Village
- Location within Turkey Location within Marmara
- Coordinates: 40°0′48″N 26°19′55″E
- Country: Turkey
- Province: Çanakkale
- District: Çanakkale
- Elevation: 150 m (490 ft)
- Population (2021): 1,480
- Time zone: UTC+3 (TRT)
- Postal code: 17060
- Area code: 0286

Erenköy is a village in the Çanakkale District of Çanakkale Province, Turkey. Its population is 1,480 (2021). In ancient times, the area was known as Ofrinio; later, it was known as Renkioi, which was later changed to Erenköy. The town was at one point renamed İntepe, but the name was changed back to Erenköy in 2010. Before the 2013 reorganisation, it was a town (belde).

== Geography ==
Although very close to the Sea of Marmara coast, Erenköy is situated in the western slopes of mountains. It is 20 kilometres (12 mi) south of Çanakkale and about 10 kilometres (6.2 mi) north east of ancient Troy.

Until 2014, when the subdistricts (bucaklar) were abolished, Erenköy was part of the İntepe subdistrict. The subdistrict covered the towns Erenköy and Kumkale and the villages Akçapınar, Akçeşme, Civler, Çıplak, Dümrek, Gökçalı, Güzelyalı, Halileli, Kalafat, Ovacık and Tevfikiye, and had a total population of 7,646 in 2011.

== History ==
=== Renkioi ===
Only 1 kilometre (0.62 mi) away from the ancient city of Ophryneion, and 1.5 kilometres (0.93 mi) from the sea, Renkioi translates from the Greek language as village of ruins. Located on locally high ground, from the top of the village can be seen: the ancient city of Troy; the Dardanelles; the cities of Çanakkale, Gallipoli and Lampsakos; the northern Aegean Sea islands; and Mount Athos.

Amphitheatrically built, it is located in an area of oak and pine trees. The only language used by the Greek Christian population was Greek, a local dialect of which was like the one used in Mitilini. The village was built with small narrow streets, known as kalnterimi, covered with white stones, lined by two-floored houses with red tiled roofs. The center of the village was the defined by the Saint Georgios maxalas (English: neighborhood), containing the main square and the market. Towards the sea was the Akamatra maxalas, while the konaki maxalas (English: government) contained the compound of the Ottoman Empire governor.

The village had two churches, the cruciform Saint Georgios which housed a revered icon, and the Assumption of the Virgin church used only on 15 August. Saint Georgios struck its own coinage to celebrate a village feast on 23 April each year.

Outside the village, Sarki was the first burial place of Achilles and Patroklos, later transferred to Leuke, an island in the Black Sea. Karantina acted as the port of Renkioi, where ships were required to call before proceeding to Constantinople, to check for contagious diseases.

=== Crimean War ===
During the Crimean War, Renkioi was located in the Allied sector. It became famous for housing the 1,000-patient Renkioi Hospital, agreed to be built by the British government under pressure from Florence Nightingale, and designed by Isambard Kingdom Brunel. Built in Gloucester Docks by timber merchants Price & Co. and designed by William Eassie, it followed on from a design from wooden huts procured by both the British Army and the French Army. The hospital was nearing completion by the end of hostilities in April 1856.

=== World War I ===
Erenköy witnessed French assault during the Gallipoli Campaign in World War I. The German army set up cannons just outside of Erenköy to control traffic along the Dardanelles and the village was evacuated until 1919.

=== Greco-Turkish War ===
After the cessation of hostilities of World War I, the Turkish War of Independence broke out immediately after the first landings of the Greco-Turkish War in the locality. In 1920, the Treaty of Sèvres demilitarized the strait, and made it an international territory under the control of the League of Nations.

But as a result of the loss by the Greek Army, the mainly Greek-diaspora residents were forced to evacuate the village, with inhabitants either moving to Asprovalta in Kavala, or Nikaia in the harbor of Piraeus.

=== Modern times ===
Following the war, the Greeks were replaced by Turks from Greece according to the population exchange between Greece and Turkey agreement. After the implementation of the 1923 Treaty of Lausanne, which restored the straits to Turkey but allowed all foreign warships to traverse the straits freely, and the settlement was renamed Erenköy.

The village location next to a significant road offered Turkish refugees from the Greek Islands a great chance to develop a new town. After establishment of a new market, in 1927–28 both a school and a church were built. The area was neutral during World War II.

In 1947, the settlement's name was changed to İntepe (name of a bastion during the Galipoli campaign) to disambiguate it from Erenköy, Kadıköy, a well known neighbourhood of Istanbul (on its Asiatic side). However, the new name wasn't popular with the Erenköy residents and after a referendum, the former name was readopted in 2010.

== Attractions ==
Erenköy hosts a Turkish military air cemetery. The town also volunteers to host a gigantic Hector sculpture.
