= Karacaören =

Karacaören (literally "roe deer ruins" in Turkish) may refer to several places:

== Dams in Turkey ==
- Karacaören-1 Dam
- Karacaören-2 Dam

== Places in Turkey ==
- Karacaören, Aksaray, a village in the district of Aksaray, Aksaray Province
- Karacaören, Beypazarı, a village in the district of Beypazarı, Ankara Province
- Karacaören, Bor, a village in Bor district of Niğde Province
- Karacaören, Bucak
- Karacaören, Çanakkale
- Karacaören, Çorum
- Karacaören, Daday, a village
- Karacaören, Güdül, a village in the district of Güdül, Ankara Province
- Karacaören, Gümüşhacıköy, a village in the district of Gümüşhacıköy, Amasya Province
- Karacaören, Gölbaşı, a village in the district of Gölbaşı, Ankara Province
- Karacaören, Horasan
- Karacaören, Kahta, a village in the district of Kahta, Adıyaman Province
- Karacaören, Karacasu, a village in the district of Karacasu, Aydın Province
- Karacaören, Kozan, a village in the district of Kozan, Adana Province
- Karacaören, Koçarlı, a village in the district of Koçarlı, Aydın Province
- Karacaören, Kumluca, a village in the district of Kumluca, Antalya Province
- Karacaören, Kıbrıscık, a village in the district of Kıbrısçık, Bolu Province
- Karacaören, Kızılcahamam, a village in the district of Kızılcahamam, Ankara Province
- Karacaören, Mecitözü
- Karacaören, Sandıklı, a village in the district of Sandıklı, Afyonkarahisar Province
- Karacaören, Sinanpaşa, a village in the district of Sinanpaşa, Afyonkarahisar Province
- Karacaören, Sur
- Karacaören, Tercan
- Karacaören, Yenipazar, a village in the district of Yenipazar, Aydın Province
- Karacaören, Çay, a village in the district of Çay, Afyonkarahisar Province
- Karacaören, Şuhut, a village in the district of Şuhut, Afyonkarahisar Province

== See also ==
- Karaca (disambiguation)
