= Ulupınar =

Ulupınar (literally "great springs" in Turkish) may refer to the following places in Turkey:

- Ulupınar, Ayaş, a village in the district of Ayaş, Ankara Province
- Ulupınar, Bilecik, a village in the district of Bilecik, Bilecik Province
- Ulupınar, Burdur
- Ulupınar, Çanakkale
- Ulupınar, Gülnar, village in the district of Gülnar, Mersin Province
- Ulupınar, Kahta, a village in the district of Kahta, Adıyaman Province
- Ulupınar, Keban
- Ulupınar, Kemer, a village in the district of Kemer, Antalya Province
