= Salihler =

Salihler is a Turkish place name and may refer to the following places in Turkey:

- Salihler, Akseki, a village in Akseki district of Antalya Province
- Salihler, Çanakkale
- Salihler, Dikili, a village in Dikili district of İzmir Province
- Salihler, Emirdağ, a village in Emirdağ district of Afyon Province
- Salihler, Güdül, a village in Güdül district of Ankara Province
