= Rhodius =

Ancient river of Troad

The Rhodius or Rhodios (Ancient Greek: Ῥόδιος) was a river of the ancient Troad, having its sources in Mount Ida, a little above the town of Astyra. It flowed in a northwestern direction, and after passing by Astyra and Cremaste discharged itself into the Hellespont between Dardanus and Abydus. Strabo states that some regarded the Rhodius as a tributary of the Aesepus; but he was likely mistaken, as the river is mentioned on the coins of Dardanus. Pliny the Elder states that this ancient river no longer existed in his time, and some modern writers identify it with the Pydius mentioned by Thucydides. Strabo also writes that the towns of Cleandria and Gordus were located on this river.
