= Gordus =

Gordus may refer to:

- Gordus (Lydia)
- Gordus (Troad)

== See also ==
- Corinth (Turkish: Gördüs)
