= Traron =

Ancient town of Troas

Coordinates: 40°00′00″N 26°16′50″E

Traron (Ancient Greek: Τράρων) was a town of ancient Troad, on the Hellespont. Tzetzes mentions a mountain so named, also in the Troad, with which the town may be connected.

Its site is located near Tek Top, 5 miles (8.0 km) southwest of Erenköy, Asiatic Turkey.
