= Yağcı =

Yağcı (derived from the Turkish word Yağ meaning oil) may refer to:

- Yağcı, Hocalar, village in the District of Hocalar, Afyonkarahisar Province, Turkey
- Yağcı, Vezirköprü, village in the Vezirköprü, Samsun Province, Turkey

== People with the surname ==
- Mehmet Yağcı (born 1972), Australian male weightlifter
- Mücahit Yağcı (born 1973), Turkish weightlifter
- Selma Yağcı (born 1981), Turkish female boxer
- Semih Yağcı (born 1988), Turkish weightlifter
- Serkan Yağcı (born 1984), Turkish karateka

== See also ==
- Yağcılar (disambiguation)
