= Karaca =

Karaca, or Qaraja (meaning "black-ish" or "roe deer" in Turkish) may refer to:

== People ==
=== Given name ===
- Husam al-Din Qaraja, 13th-century statesman
- Qaraja Ilyas, Safavid governor of Erivan from 1502
- Zayn al-Din Qaraja, Beg of Dulkadir from 1337 to 1353

=== Surname ===
- Karaca or Caradja, Byzantine family
- Bora Karaca, producer for the band Tally Hall
- Cem Karaca (1945–2004), Turkish musician and son of Toto Karaca
- Efecan Karaca (born 1989), Turkish footballer
- Gizem Karaca (born 1992), Turkish actress and model
- Hidayet Karaca (born 1963), Turkish journalist
- Işın Karaca (born 1973), Turkish singer
- Kâni Karaca (1930–2004), Turkish singer
- Mehmet Karaca (born 1957), rector of Istanbul Technical University (ITU)
- Reyhan Karaca (born 1970), Turkish singer
- Toto Karaca (1912–1992), Turkish stage actress and mother of Rem Karaca
- Yasin Karaca (born 1983), Turkish footballer

=== Other ===
- Turabay ibn Qaraja, chieftain of the Banu Haritha tribe

== Places ==
- Karaca, Çat
- Karaca Cave, a network of caves near Torul, Turkey
- Karaca Dağ, a volcano in eastern Turkey
- Karaca Island, an Aegean island of Turkey
- Karaca, Çorum

== See also ==
- Karacalar (disambiguation), various places
- Karacaören (disambiguation), various places
