= Karacalar =

Karacalar (literally "roe deer" in Turkish) may refer to the following places in Turkey:

- Karacalar, Akyurt, a neighborhood of the district of Akyurt, Ankara Province
- Karaçalar, Araç, a neighborhood in the district of Araç, Kastamonu Province
- Karacalar, Çanakkale
- Karacalar, Emirdağ, a village in the district of Emirdağ, Afyonkarahisar Province
- Karacalar, Gölpazarı, a village in the district of Gölpazarı, Bilecik Province
- Karacalar, Göynük, a village in the district of Göynük, Bolu Province
- Karacalar, Manavgat, a village in the district of Manavgat, Antalya Province
- Karacalar, Mengen, a village in the district of Mengen, Bolu Province
- Karacalar, Savaştepe, a village
- Karacalar, Silvan
- Karacalar, Sındırgı, a village
- Karacalar, Üzümlü
- Karacalar Dam, a dam in Turkey

== See also ==
- Karaca (disambiguation)
- Qarajalar (disambiguation)
