= Terziler =

Terziler can refer to:

- Terziler, Aydın
- Terziler, Çanakkale
