= Sapanlı =

Sapanlı can refer to:

- Sapanlı, Güdül
- Sapanlı, Narman
- Sapanlı, Nusaybin
