= Taşören =

Taşören can refer to:

- Taşören, Güdül
- Taşören, Kovancılar
