= Yapıldak =

Yapıldak can refer to:

- Yapıldak, Çanakkale
- Yapıldak, İpsala
