= Cleandria =

Town on the Rhodius River

Cleandria or Kleandria (Ancient Greek: Κλεανδρία) was a town located on the Rhodius River in the ancient Troad mentioned by Strabo.

Its site is unlocated, but probably located between the Karamenderes River (the ancient Scamander) and the Çan Çayı (the ancient Granicus), 60 stadia from Kale Peuke.
