= Sarıbeyli =

Sarıbeyli can refer to:

- Sarıbeyli, Çanakkale
- Sarıbeyli, Çivril
