= Akgül =

Akgül or Akgul (meaning "white rose" in several Turkic languages) is a surname and given name. Notable people with the name include:

== Surname ==
- Bayram Akgül (born 1970), Turkish soccer club owner
- Bilal Akgül (born 1982), Turkish Olympian mountain biker
- Ferman Akgül (born 1979), Turkish songwriter
- Mustafa Akgül (1948–2017), Turkish information technologist
- Seda Akgül (born 1971), Turkish server and academician
- Sezar Akgül (born 1987), Turkish sport wrestler
- Tayfun Akgül (born 1963), Turkish cartoonist and academician
- Taha Akgül (born 1990), Turkish sport wrestler
- Tuba Akgül (born 1996), Turkish professional kick boxing athlete
- Helin Akgül (born 2000), Turkish professional influencer

== Given name ==
- Akgul Amanmuradova, Uzbekistani tennis player
