= Kayadere =

Kayadere can refer to:

- Kayadere, Çanakkale
- Kayadere, Silvan
