= Musaköy =

Musaköy can refer to:

- Musaköy, Çanakkale
- Musaköy, İnebolu
- Musaköy, Ilgaz
- another name for Xanlıqlar, Qazakh
