= Mustafa Akgül =

Turkish computer scientist (1948–2017)

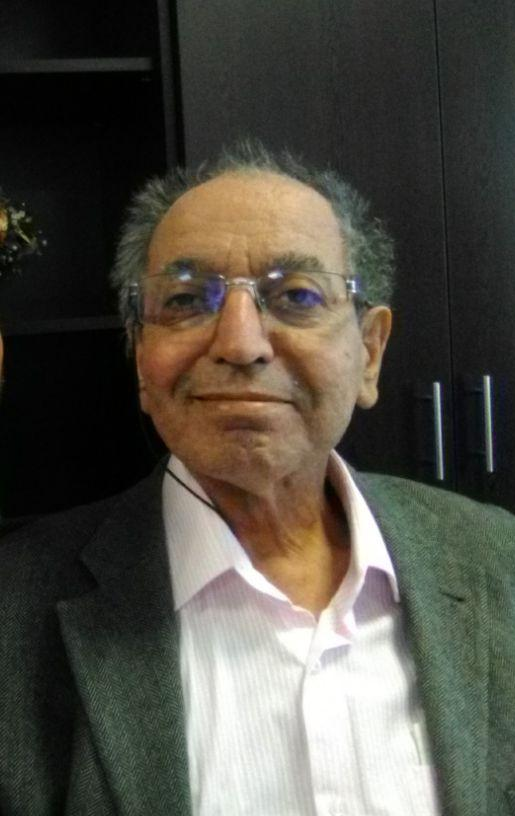
- Born: 10 May 1948
- Died: 13 December 2017 (aged 69)
- Resting place: Karşıyaka Cemetery, Ankara; T21B 576; 40.0003586N, 32.7892651E
- Citizenship: Türk
- Occupations: Academician, engineer, mathematician, activist
- Known for: The spread of the internet and free software in Turkey
- Notable work: Free Software Camps, Academic Informatics, Internet in Turkey Conference, Internet Week
- Movement: Free software movement, Linux Users Association, Internet Technologies Association
- Awards: TÜBİTAK Incentive Award (1988), LKD Penguin of the Century Award (2004), TBD Informatics Service Awards Special Award (2011)
- Website: akgul.linux.org.tr

Mustafa Akgül (10 May 1948 – 13 December 2017) was a Turkish computer scientist who was the key figure of the acceptance of the Internet in Turkey. In 1987, he moved to Bilkent University, where he remained until his death.

He went to the University of Waterloo, Canada and got his PhD in combinatorics and optimisation. In Turkey, he started with the motto of "Internet is life". He had many ways to reach people in academia, in social media, and ordinary people at the street. His goal, initially, was to raise public awareness of the Internet in Turkey.

== Life ==
Born on May 10, 1948 in Yeşilöz village in Güdül district of Ankara, Turkey. He received his bachelor's degree in civil engineering from Middle East Technical University in 1970 and his master's degree in operations research from the same university in 1974. In 1981, he received his doctorate in combinatorics and optimization from the University of Waterloo. He worked as a visiting professor at the University of Delaware and North Carolina State University in the United States. In 1987, he moved to Bilkent University, where he remained until his death.

Akgül, who met and used the Internet while abroad, pioneered the widespread use of the Internet in the country after Turkey was connected to the Internet on April 12, 1993. In this process, two years later, he brought mailing list members together at the 1st Turkey Internet Conference in 1995. The Turkish Linux Users Group, which was established at this conference, held its first meeting and gave its first speech on free software at this conference. In 1999, the Academic Informatics Conference was organized to bring together groups and individuals working on information technologies in universities and to establish a common policy, and a one-day GNU/Linux training was organized before the conference. This one-day training organized before the conference would be the forerunner of the free software winter camps that would be organized for years to come. In 2005, Academic Informatics Conferences became international rather than national. In 2002, for the first time in Turkey, an event on free software was organized under the name Free Software and Linux Festival, which was later renamed Free Software and Linux Days. In 2010, the first Linux Summer Camp, which provided training on GNU/Linux such as system administration, was organized for the first time with Akgül's initiatives, and the event continued to be held at Bolu Abant İzzet Baysal University for two weeks in the summer for many years. The first Linux Summer Camp was designed as a single class, 10-day training, but by 2017 it had grown into a large event with more than 600 participants in 21 classes.

Mustafa Akgül served on the boards of Linux Users Association, Internet Technologies Association and Turkish Informatics Association. He led the team that organized the Internet Week in Turkey, which has been organized since 1998 with the slogan "Internet is life". In 2000, after the Linux Users Association was founded, he served as the chairman of the board of directors for the first eight years.

On December 13, 2017, he died in the hospital where he had been receiving treatment for a long time. After his death, the names of the pre-academic Informatics courses and the Linux Summer Camp, which he had worked on for many years, were changed to Mustafa Akgül Free Software Winter Camp and Mustafa Akgül Free Software Summer Camp in his memory.

== Assignments received ==
- Internet board - president
- Kamunet - technical board president
- 8th Plan Informatics - president of specialization commission
- 2nd Informatics Council - president of the law commission
- Linux Users Association - founder and honorary president
- Internet Technologies Association - president
- Union of Chambers and Commodity Exchanges of Turkey - sector board membership
- Turkish Informatics Association - board member
