= Akçalı =

Akçalı (literally "white shrub" or "white bush") is a Turkish place name and may refer to:

- Akçalı, Adıyaman, a village in the District of Adıyaman, Adıyaman Province, Turkey
- Akçalı, Bartın, a village in the District of Bartın, Bartın Province, Turkey
- Akçalı, Beypazarı, a village in the District of Beypazarı, Ankara Province, Turkey
- Akçalı, Bitlis, a village
- Akçalı, Çanakkale
- Akçalı, Eldivan
- Akçalı, Karaisalı, a village in the District of Karaisalı, Adana Province, Turkey
- Akçalı, Kemaliye
- Akçalı, Kozluk, a village in the District of Kozluk, Batman Province, Turkey
- Akçalı, Sungurlu
