= Ahmet Köksal =

Turkish poet and writer (1920–1997)

- Born: 1920; Kızılkeçili, Turkey
- Died: January 24, 1997; Istanbul, Turkey
- Education: Ankara Gazi Eğitim Enstitüsü

Ahmet Köksal (1920 – 24 January 1997) was a Turkish poet and writer.

== Early life and education ==
Ahmet Köksal was born in Kızılkeçili a village of Çanakkale in 1920. He went to primary and middle school in Çanakkale and in 1936 went to the Edirne Boys Pedegogical School graduating in 1939. For two years he was a primary school teacher at Ayvacık. After finishing his military service, Köksal was a student at the Ankara Gazi Eğitim Enstitüsü painting works department from 1943 to 1946. After completing his education here, he started teaching middle school.

== Career ==
Köksals spoems were published in the Servet-i Fünûn -Uyanış magazine in 1940. Later his poems were also to be seen in Ülkü, Yirminci Asır, Edebiyat Dünyası, Varlık, Yeditepe, Kaynak, and Seçilmiş Hikayeler.

He wrote both criticisms and promotions of books which appeared in the Papirüs, Yeni Edebiyat, Yeni Gazete and Yansıma. His travel memoirs titled Yollar Boyunca were published in Cumhuriyet in 1970. His critical writings about art were published in Milliyet.

== Works ==
=== Poetry books ===
- 1958: Yanık Sar
- 1963: Sonsuz Haziran
- 1991: Çoğul Mavilik

=== Poetry anthology ===
- 1953: Atatürk İçin (B. Gider ve Ş. Saba)
- 1973: Aşk Şiirleri Antolojisi (Poems for Children)

=== Analysis ===
- 1988: Ressam, Eğitimci ve Yazar Malik Aksel
