= Kırkkavak =

Kırkkavak (literally "forty poplar trees") is a Turkish place name and it may refer to

- Kırkkavak, Güdül - a village in Güdül district of Ankara Province
- Kırkkavak, Manavgat - a village in Manavgat district of Antalya Province
- Kırkkavak, Uzunköprü - a village in Uzunköprü district of Edirne Province
- Kırkkavak, Mut - a village in Mut district of Mersin Province
