= Pınarlar =

Pınarlar can refer to the following places in Turkey:

- Pınarlar, Düzce
- Pınarlar, former name of Nimri, Keban, Keban District, Elazığ Province
- Pınarlar, Tavas
- Pınarlar, Tufanbeyli
