= Çiftlikdere =

Çiftlikdere can refer to:

- Çiftlikdere, Çanakkale
- Çiftlikdere, Savaştepe
