= Elmacık =

Elmacık may refer to:

- Elmacık, Adıyaman, village in Adıyaman Province, Turkey
- Elmacık, Aksaray, village in Aksaray Province, Turkey
- Elmacık, Çanakkale
- Elmacık, Gümüşova
- Elmacık, Kemer
