= Işıklar (disambiguation) =

Işıklar (literally "lights") is a Turkish word and may refer to:

== Places ==
- Işıklar, a town in the central district of Afyonkarahisar, Turkey
- Işıklar, Baskil
- Işıklar, Bismil
- Işıklar, Bolu, a village in the central district of Bolu, Turkey
- Işıklar, Çanakkale
- Işıklar, Karacasu, a village in Karacasu district of Aydın Province, Turkey
- Işıklar, Karpuzlu, a village in Karpuzlu district of Aydın Province, Turkey
- Işıklar, Kızıltepe
- Işıklar, Manyas, a village
- Işıklar, Mustafakemalpaşa
- Işıklar, Mut, a village in Mut district of Mersin Province, Turkey
- Işıklar, Nazilli, a village in Nazilli district of Aydın Province, Turkey
- Işıklar, Sındırgı, a village
- Işıklar, Yeşilova
