= Çalık =

Çalık is a Turkish surname. Notable people with the surname include:

- Ahmet Çalık (born 1958), Turkish businessman
- Ahmet Yılmaz Çalık (1994–2022), Turkish footballer
- Burak Çalık (born 1989), Turkish footballer
- Şadi Çalık (1917–1979), Turkish sculptor

== See also ==
- Çalık, Keban
