= Ortaca (disambiguation) =

Ortaca is a town and district of Muğla Province, Turkey.

Ortaca is a Turkish word that may refer to the following places in Turkey:

- Ortaca, Çanakkale
- Ortaca, Gerede, a village in the district of Gerede, Bolu Province
- Ortaca, Gerger, a village in the district of Gerger, Adıyaman Province
- Ortaca, Kozluk, a village in the district of Kozluk, Batman Province
- Ortaca, Söğüt, a village in the district of Söğüt, Bilecik Province
- Ortacalar, Arhavi, a village in the district of Arhavi, Artvin Province
