= Kızılcaören =

Kızılcaören can refer to the following villages in Turkey:

- Kızılcaören, Çanakkale
- Kızılcaören, Hamamözü
- Kızılcaören, Kıbrıscık
- Kızılcaören, Kızılcahamam
- Kızılcaören, Taşköprü
- Kızılcaören, Vezirköprü
