= Kopuzlu =

Kopuzlu can refer to:

- Kopuzlu, Bismil
- Kopuzlu, Keban
- Kopuzlu, Posof
