= Saraycık =

Saraycık (literally "little palace") is a Turkic word that may refer to:

== Places ==
=== Turkey ===
- Saraycık, Ağın
- Saraycık, Amasya, a village in the district of Amasya, Amasya Province
- Saraycık, Bayburt, a village in the district of Bayburt, Bayburt Province
- Saraycık, Bayramiç
- Saraycık, Bolu, a village in the district of Bolu, Bolu Province
- Saraycık, Bozüyük, a village in the district of Bozüyük, Bilecik Province
- Saraycık, Çanakkale
- Saraycık, Çerkeş
- Saraycık, Çayırlı
- Saraycık, Gerger, a village in the district of Gerger, Adıyaman Province
- Saraycık, Gümüşhacıköy, a village in the district of Gümüşhacıköy, Amasya Province
- Saraycık, Ilgaz
- Saraycık, İskilip
- Saraycık, Kargı
- Saraycık, Kastamonu, a village in the district of Kastamonu, Kastamonu Province
- Saraycık, Kızılcahamam, a village in the district of Kızılcahamam, Ankara Province
- Saraycık, Kızılırmak
- Saraycık, Merzifon, a village in the district of Merzifon, Amasya Province
- Saraycık, Sinanpaşa, a village in the district of Sinanpaşa, Afyonkarahisar Province
- Saraycık, Sungurlu
- Saraycık, Vezirköprü, a village in the district of Vezirköprü, Samsun Province
- Saraycık, Çubuk, a village in the district of Çubuk, Ankara Province

=== Other ===
- Saray-Jük, a medieval city on the border between Europe and Asia in the 10th to 16th centuries
