= Akçatepe =

Akçatepe may refer to:

== People ==
- Halit Akçatepe (1938–2017), Turkish actor
- Sitki Akçatepe (1902–1985), Turkish actor

== Places ==
- Akçatepe, Keban
- Akçatepe, Tut, a village in the district of Tut, Adıyaman Province, Turkey
