= Denizli (disambiguation) =

Denizli may refer to:

== People ==
- Mustafa Denizli (born 1949), former Turkish football player and coach
- Sudem Denizli (born 2005), Turkish female swimmer

== Places ==
- Denizli, growing industrial city in the Southwestern part of Turkey
- Denizli Atatürk Stadium, multi-purpose stadium in Denizli, Turkey
- Denizli Çardak Airport, airport located in Çardak, Denizli Province, Turkey
- Denizli Province, province of Turkey in Western Anatolia
- Denizli or Xeros, village in the Nicosia District of Cyprus
- Denizli, Sungurlu
- Denizli, Keban

== Sports clubs ==
- Denizli B.S.K., TFF Second League team
- Denizlispor, sports club based in Denizli, Turkey
