= Çamyayla =

Çamyayla can refer to:

- Çamyayla, Ayancık
- Çamyayla, Bolu
- Çamyayla, Bozüyük
- Çamyayla, Çanakkale
