= Kavaközü =

Kavaközü may refer to any of three different settlements in Turkey:

- Kavaközü, Güdül, in Ankara Province
- Kavaközü, Kızılcahamam, in Ankara Province
- Kavaközü, Mut, in Mersin Province
