= Gökbelen, Keban =

Village in Elazığ Province, Turkey

Gökbelen
- Village
- Location in Turkey
- Coordinates: 38.701°N 38.688°E
- Country: Turkey
- Province: Elazığ
- District: Keban
- Population (2021): 92
- Time zone: UTC+3 (TRT)

Gökbelen (Kurdish: Zirkî Baz) is a village in the Keban District of Elazığ Province in Turkey. The village is populated by Kurds of the Zirkan tribe and had a population of 92 in 2021.

The hamlets of Soğuksu and Tuzkaya are attached to the village.
