= Özköy, Güdül =

Özköy
- Neighbourhood
- Location in Turkey Özköy (Turkey Central Anatolia)
- Coordinates: 40°13′58″N 32°7′31″E
- Country: Turkey
- Province: Ankara
- District: Güdül
- Population (2022): 57
- Time zone: UTC+3 (TRT)

Özköy is a neighbourhood in the municipality and district of Güdül, Ankara Province, Turkey. Its population is 57 (2022).
