= Kemel, Çanakkale =

Village in Turkey

Kemalköy
- Village
- Location in Turkey Kemalköy (Marmara)
- Coordinates: 40°09′18″N 26°31′10″E
- Country: Turkey
- Province: Çanakkale
- District: Çanakkale
- Population (2021): 273
- Time zone: UTC+3 (TRT)

Kemel is a village in the Çanakkale District of Çanakkale Province in Turkey. Its population is 273 (2021).
