= Çanakkale District =

District of Çanakkale Province, Turkey

- District
- Map showing Çanakkale District in Çanakkale Province

- Location within Turkey Location within Marmara
- Coordinates: 40°07′N 26°26′E
- Country: Turkey
- Province: Çanakkale
- Seat: Çanakkale
- Area: 1,016 km^{2} (392 sq mi)
- Population (2021): 195,439
  - Density: 192.4/km^{2} (498.2/sq mi)
- Time zone: UTC+3 (TRT)

Çanakkale District (also Merkez, meaning "central") is a district of the Çanakkale Province of Turkey. Its seat is the city of Çanakkale. Its area is 1,016 km^{2}, and its population is 195,439 (2021).

== Composition ==
There are two municipalities in Çanakkale District:

- Çanakkale
- Kepez

There are 52 villages in Çanakkale District:

- Akçalı
- Akçapınar
- Akçeşme
- Alanköy
- Aşağıokçular
- Belen
- Bodurlar
- Çamyayla
- Çiftlikdere
- Çınarlı
- Çıplak
- Civler
- Dedeler
- Denizgöründü
- Dümrek
- Elmacık
- Erenköy
- Gökçalı
- Güzelyalı
- Halileli
- Haliloğlu
- Işıklar
- Kalabaklı
- Kalafat
- Karacalar
- Karacaören
- Karapınar
- Kayadere
- Kemel
- Kızılcaören
- Kızılkeçili
- Kirazlı
- Kocalar
- Kumkale
- Kurşunlu
- Maraşal Fevzi Çakmak
- Musaköy
- Ortaca
- Ovacık
- Özbek
- Salihler
- Saraycık
- Sarıbeyli
- Sarıcaeli
- Serçiler
- Taşlıtarla
- Terziler
- Tevfikiye
- Ulupınar
- Yağcılar
- Yapıldak
- Yukarıokçular
