= Bayındır, Keban =

Village in Turkey

Bayındır
- Village
- Location in Turkey
- Coordinates: 38.8163°N 38.6643°E
- Country: Turkey
- Province: Elazığ
- District: Keban
- Population (2021): 25
- Time zone: UTC+3 (TRT)

Bayındır is a village in the Keban District of Elazığ Province in Turkey. Its population is 25 (2021). The village is populated by Kurds and Turkmens.
