= Koyunuşağı, Keban =

Village in Elazığ Province, Turkey

Koyunuşağı
- Village
- Location in Turkey
- Coordinates: 38.697°N 38.623°E
- Country: Turkey
- Province: Elazığ
- District: Keban
- Population (2021): 46
- Time zone: UTC+3 (TRT)

Koyunuşağı is a village in the Keban District of Elazığ Province in Turkey. The village is populated by Kurds of the Zeyve tribe and had a population of 46 in 2021.
