= Keban =

- Municipality
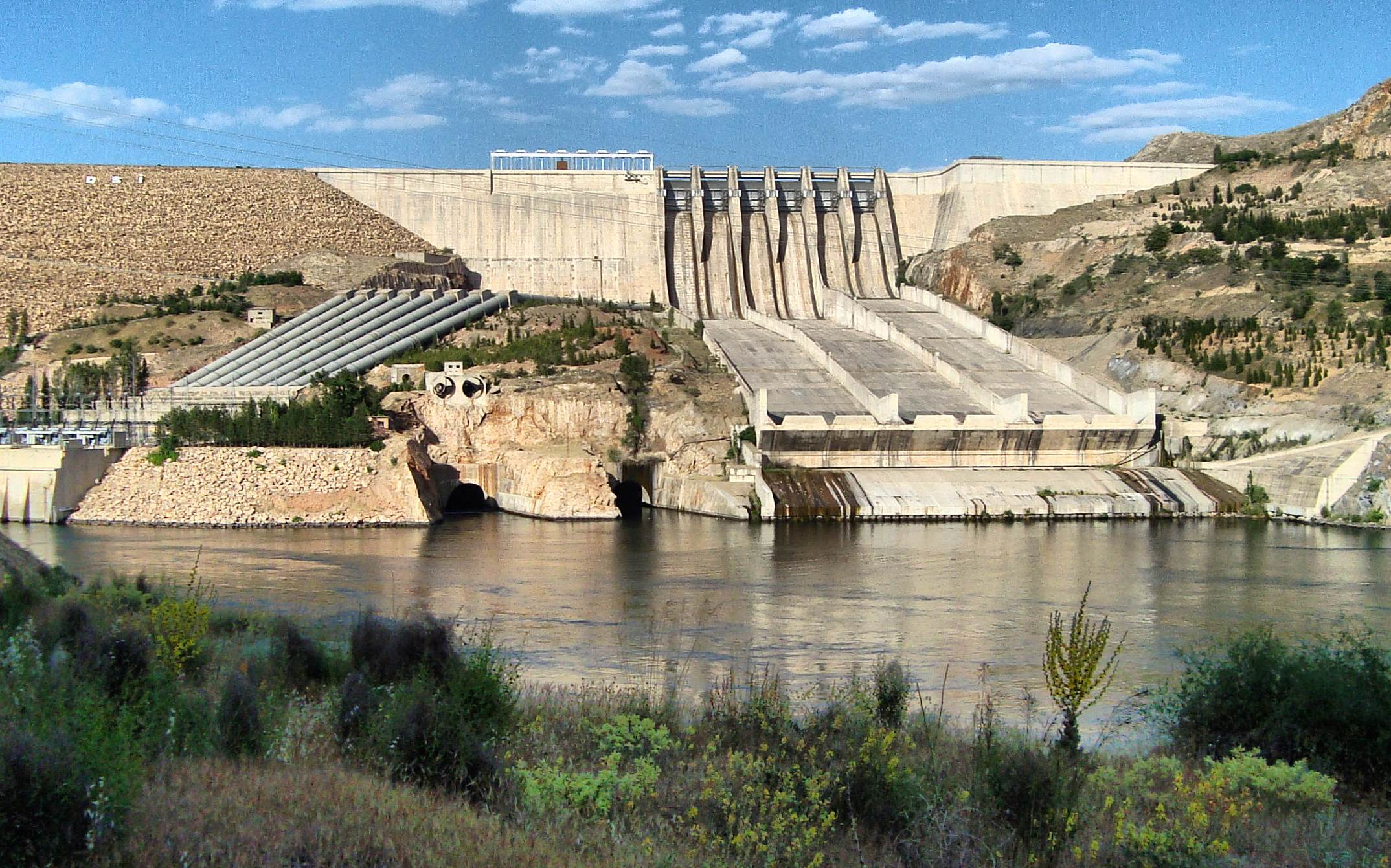
- Keban Dam

- Location within Turkey
- Coordinates: 38°47′33″N 38°44′38″E
- Country: Turkey
- Province: Elazığ
- District: Keban

Government
  - Mayor: Yücel Doğan (MHP)
- Elevation: 780 m (2,560 ft)
- Population (2022): 5,906
- Time zone: UTC+3 (TRT)
- Postal code: 23700
- Climate: Csa
- Website: www.keban.bel.tr

Keban is a town of Elazığ Province of Turkey. It is the seat of Keban District. Its population is 5,906 (2022). In the local elections 2024 the Nationalist Movement Party candidate Yücel Doğan was elected as Mayor.

Keban is in the west of Elazığ Province and 46 km away from the province center. In the west of Keban, there is Arapgir District of Malatya Province, in the north there is Çemişgezek District of Tunceli Province, at northwest, Ağın District, in the south, Baskil district, it has the second largest dam of Turkey, Keban Dam.

== Notable people ==
- Cemîl Bayik

== Bibliography ==
- Çakar, Enver (2019), 19. yüzyılın ilk yarısında keban köylerinin idari ve demografik yapısı
