= Belen, Çanakkale =

Village in Turkey

Belen
- Village
- Location in Turkey Belen (Marmara)
- Coordinates: 40.0943°N 26.5122°E
- Country: Turkey
- Province: Çanakkale
- District: Çanakkale
- Population (2021): 58
- Time zone: UTC+3 (TRT)

Belen is a village in the Çanakkale District of Çanakkale Province in Turkey. Its population is 58 (2021).
