= Boyalı, Güdül =

Boyalı
- Neighbourhood
- Location in Turkey Boyalı (Turkey Central Anatolia)
- Coordinates: 40.1685°N 32.2889°E
- Country: Turkey
- Province: Ankara
- District: Güdül
- Population (2022): 243
- Time zone: UTC+3 (TRT)

Boyalı is a neighbourhood in the municipality and district of Güdül, Ankara Province, Turkey. Its population is 243 (2022).
