= Göldere, Keban =

Village in Elazığ Province, Turkey

Göldere
- Village
- Location in Turkey
- Coordinates: 38.709°N 38.658°E
- Country: Turkey
- Province: Elazığ
- District: Keban
- Population (2021): 18
- Time zone: UTC+3 (TRT)

Göldere (Kurdish: Zirkî Çukan) is a village in the Keban District of Elazığ Province in Turkey. The village is populated by Kurds of the Zirkan tribe and had a population of 18 in 2021.

The hamlet of Uzunyol is attached to the village.
