= Aslankaşı, Keban =

Village in Turkey

Aslankaşı
- Village
- Location in Turkey
- Coordinates: 38°49′37″N 38°52′11″E
- Country: Turkey
- Province: Elazığ
- District: Keban
- Population (2021): 52
- Time zone: UTC+3 (TRT)

Aslankaşı (Kurdish: Nisk) is a village in the Keban District of Elazığ Province in Turkey. Its population is 52 (2021). The village is populated by Kurds.
