= Bahçeli, Keban =

Village in Elazığ Province, Turkey

Bahçeli
- Village
- Location in Turkey
- Coordinates: 38.716°N 38.766°E
- Country: Turkey
- Province: Elazığ
- District: Keban
- Population (2021): 34
- Time zone: UTC+3 (TRT)

Bahçeli (Kurdish: Zeynan) is a village in the Keban District of Elazığ Province in Turkey. The village is populated by Kurds of the Milan tribe and had a population of 34 in 2021.
