= Akçakese, Güdül =

Akçakese
- Neighbourhood
- Location in Turkey Akçakese (Turkey Central Anatolia)
- Coordinates: 40°18′32″N 32°20′27″E
- Country: Turkey
- Province: Ankara
- District: Güdül
- Population (2022): 254
- Time zone: UTC+3 (TRT)

Akçakese is a neighbourhood in the municipality and district of Güdül, Ankara Province, Turkey. Its population is 254 (2022).

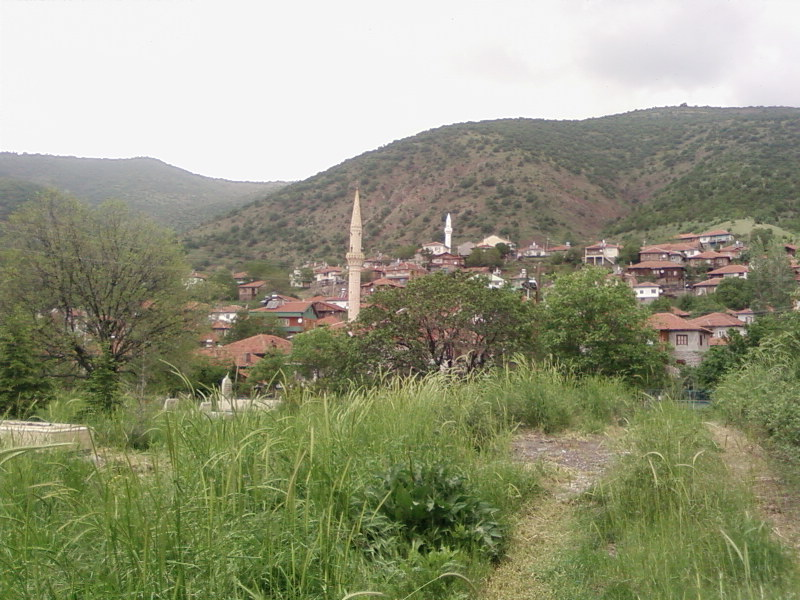
Akçakese
