= Çevrekaya, Keban =

Village in Turkey

Çevrekaya
- Village
- Location in Turkey
- Coordinates: 38°44′N 38°43′E
- Country: Turkey
- Province: Elazığ
- District: Keban
- Population (2021): 85
- Time zone: UTC+3 (TRT)

Çevrekaya (Kurdish: Zeryan) is a village in the Keban District of Elazığ Province in Turkey. Its population is 85 (2021).
