= Keban District =

- District
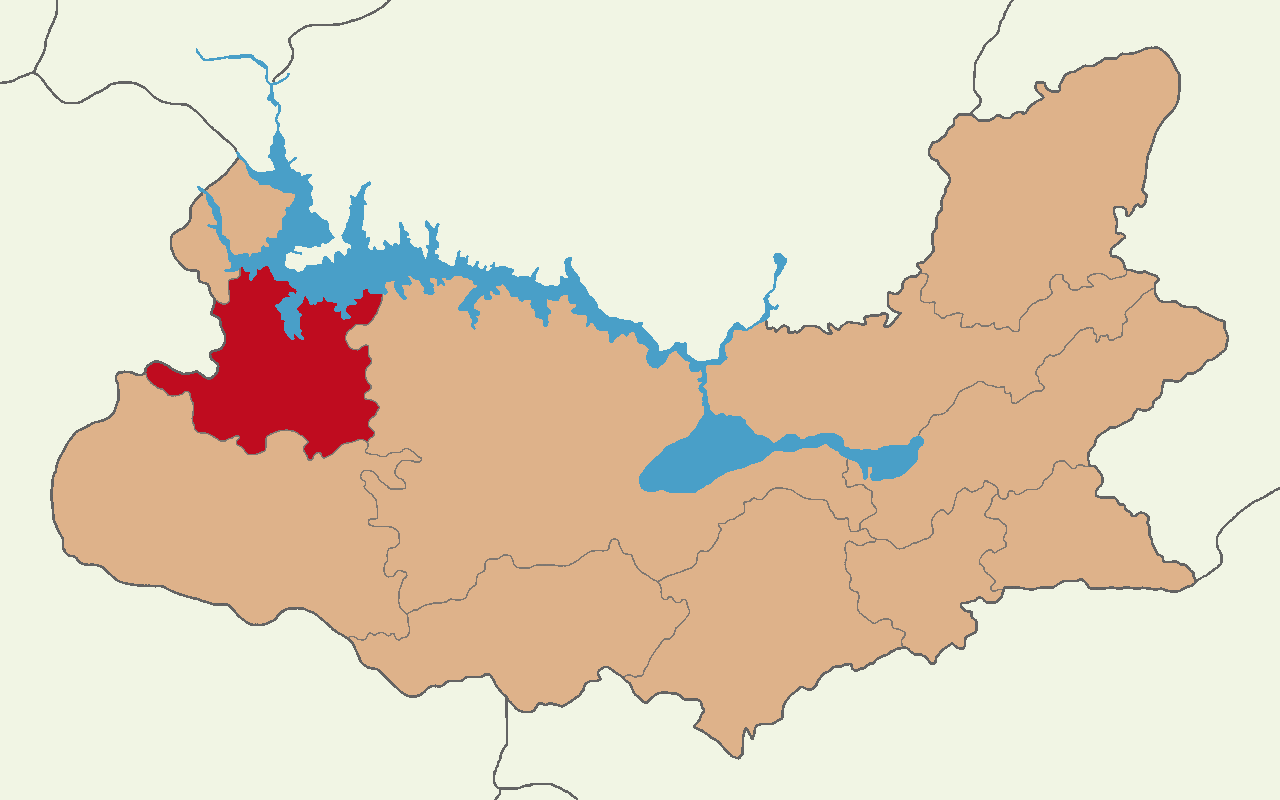
- Map showing Keban District in Elazığ Province

- Location in Turkey
- Coordinates: 38°48′N 38°45′E
- Country: Turkey
- Province: Elazığ
- Seat: Keban

Government
  - Kaymakam: Ersin Tepeli
- Area: 641 km^{2} (247 sq mi)
- Population (2021): 6,210
  - Density: 9.7/km^{2} (25/sq mi)
- Time zone: UTC+3 (TRT)

Keban District is a district of Elazığ Province of Turkey. Its seat is the town Keban. Its area is 641 km^{2}, and its population is 6,210 (2021).

== Demographics ==
In 1927, 79.6% of the population spoke Turkish as their first language, while the remaining 20.4% spoke Kurdish. Only Muslims resided in the district that year. In 1968, Kurdish-speakers rose to 39%.

== Composition ==
There is 1 municipality in Keban District:

- Keban

There are 30 villages in Keban District:

- Akçatepe
- Akgömlek
- Altınkürek
- Altıyaka
- Aşağıçakmak
- Aslankaşı
- Bademli
- Bahçeli
- Bayındır
- Beydeğirmeni
- Bölükçalı
- Büklümlü
- Çalık
- Çevrekaya
- Denizli
- Dürümlü
- Gökbelen
- Göldere
- Güneytepe
- Kopuzlu
- Koyunuşağı
- Kurşunkaya
- Kuşçu
- Nimri
- Örenyaka
- Sağdıçlar
- Taşkesen
- Topkıran
- Üçpınar
- Ulupınar

== Sources ==
- Çakar, Enver (2019), 19. yüzyılın ilk yarısında keban köylerinin idari ve demografik yapısı
