= Yelli, Güdül =

Yelli
- Neighbourhood
- Location in Turkey Yelli (Turkey Central Anatolia)
- Coordinates: 40°16′N 32°15′E
- Country: Turkey
- Province: Ankara
- District: Güdül
- Population (2022): 124
- Time zone: UTC+3 (TRT)

Yelli is a neighbourhood in the municipality and district of Güdül, Ankara Province, Turkey. Its population is 124 (2022).
