= Akbaş, Güdül =

Akbaş
- Neighbourhood
- Location in Turkey Akbaş (Turkey Central Anatolia)
- Coordinates: 40.2328°N 32.2911°E
- Country: Turkey
- Province: Ankara
- District: Güdül
- Population (2022): 137
- Time zone: UTC+3 (TRT)

Akbaş is a neighbourhood in the municipality and district of Güdül, Ankara Province, Turkey. Its population is 137 (2022).
