= Güneytepe, Keban =

Village in Turkey

Güneytepe
- Village
- Location in Turkey
- Coordinates: 38°42′24″N 38°53′36″E
- Country: Turkey
- Province: Elazığ
- District: Keban
- Population (2021): 38
- Time zone: UTC+3 (TRT)

Güneytepe (Kurdish:Xalfe) is a village in the Keban District of Elazığ Province in Turkey. Its population is 38 (2021).
