= Alanköy, Çanakkale =

Village in Turkey

Alanköy
- Village
- Location in Turkey Alanköy (Marmara)
- Coordinates: 40.0166°N 26.7778°E
- Country: Turkey
- Province: Çanakkale
- District: Çanakkale
- Population (2023): 54
- Time zone: UTC+3 (TRT)

Alanköy is a village in the Çanakkale District of Çanakkale Province in Turkey. Its population is 54 (2023).
