= Denizgöründü, Çanakkale =

Village in Turkey

Denizgöründü
- Village
- Location in Turkey Denizgöründü (Marmara)
- Coordinates: 40°00′N 26°28′E
- Country: Turkey
- Province: Çanakkale
- District: Çanakkale
- Population (2021): 137
- Time zone: UTC+3 (TRT)

Denizgöründü is a village in the Çanakkale District of Çanakkale Province in Turkey. Its population is 137 (2021).
