= Adalıkuzu, Güdül =

Adalıkuzu
- Neighbourhood
- Location in Turkey Adalıkuzu (Turkey Central Anatolia)
- Coordinates: 40°11′N 32°11′E
- Country: Turkey
- Province: Ankara
- District: Güdül
- Population (2022): 112
- Time zone: UTC+3 (TRT)

Adalıkuzu is a neighbourhood in the municipality and district of Güdül, Ankara Province, Turkey. Its population is 112 (2022).
