= Afşar, Güdül =

Afşar
- Neighbourhood
- Location in Turkey Afşar (Turkey Central Anatolia)
- Coordinates: 40.1533°N 32.2384°E
- Country: Turkey
- Province: Ankara
- District: Güdül
- Population (2022): 67
- Time zone: UTC+3 (TRT)

Afşar is a neighbourhood in the municipality and district of Güdül, Ankara Province, Turkey. Its population is 67 (2022).
