= Aşağıçakmak, Keban =

Village in Turkey

Aşağıçakmak
- Village
- Location in Turkey
- Coordinates: 38.7306°N 38.8864°E
- Country: Turkey
- Province: Elazığ
- District: Keban
- Population (2021): 73
- Time zone: UTC+3 (TRT)

Aşağıçakmak (Kurdish: Çaqmaq) is a village in the Keban District of Elazığ Province in Turkey. Its population is 73 (2021). The village is populated by Kurds and is the village of Cemîl Bayik.
