= Altıyaka, Keban =

Village in Turkey

Altıyaka
- Village
- Location in Turkey
- Coordinates: 38°41′N 38°51′E
- Country: Turkey
- Province: Elazığ
- District: Keban
- Population (2021): 124
- Time zone: UTC+3 (TRT)

Altıyaka (Kurdish:Temte) is a village in the Keban District of Elazığ Province in Turkey. Its population is 124 (2021).
