= Garipçe, Güdül =

Garipçe
- Neighbourhood
- Location in Turkey Garipçe (Turkey Central Anatolia)
- Coordinates: 40.1875°N 32.2127°E
- Country: Turkey
- Province: Ankara
- District: Güdül
- Population (2022): 366
- Time zone: UTC+3 (TRT)

Garipçe is a neighbourhood in the municipality and district of Güdül, Ankara Province, Turkey. Its population is 366 (2022).
