= Qarajalar =

Qarajalar may refer to:

- Salarabad, Zanjan (AKA Qarajalar), a village in Qareh Poshtelu-e Pain Rural District, Qareh Poshtelu District, Zanjan County, Zanjan Province, Iran
- Qaracalar, a village and municipality in the Saatly Rayon of Azerbaijan
- Qaracalar, Qarayazı, a village in Gardabani Municipality, Georgia
- Karacalar (disambiguation)
