= Kepez, Çanakkale =

Kepez
- Municipality
- Location in Turkey Kepez (Marmara)
- Coordinates: 40°05′59″N 26°23′48″E
- Country: Turkey
- Province: Çanakkale
- District: Çanakkale
- Population (2022): 35,390
- Time zone: UTC+3 (TRT)

Kepez is a seaside town (belde) in the Çanakkale District, Çanakkale Province, Turkey. Its population is 35,390 (2022). The town has its own municipality which was established in 1992.

== Geography ==
Kepez is located 3 kilometers south from Çanakkale city center. It is on the main İzmir to Çanakkale highway, the D.550. Kepez has a port.

== Population ==
Historical population
Year	Pop.	±% p.a.
1985	3,404	—
1990	4,282	+4.70%
1997	6,280	+5.62%
2007	10,655	+5.43%
2012	15,431	+7.69%
2017	25,544	+10.61%
2022	35,390	+6.74%
Source: Population censuses (1985-1997) and TÜIK (2007-2022)

Kepez is a rapidly growing town, made up of predominantly new housing in the form of apartment blocks.

== Facilities ==
There is a water park in Kepez and it has its own beach area and a sea front promenade with restaurants, cafes and a picnic area. The town has a municipality building, a large park and picnic area and playground for children as well as a small park in the centre which has a couple of small tea houses. There are some supermarkets and small shops and many small restaurants. The area is served with a central taxi point and is on the Çanakkale bus route with regular connections to the city centre. Kepez has a covered market which is open every Monday.

Kepez has a large dental centre, social services centre and two hospitals nearby. The Turhan Mildon Culture and Craft Centre organizes regular events. There is a sports stadium and a chess club.
