= Sorgun, Güdül =

Sorgun
- Neighbourhood
- Location in Turkey Sorgun (Turkey Central Anatolia)
- Coordinates: 40.3380°N 32.2684°E
- Country: Turkey
- Province: Ankara
- District: Güdül
- Population (2022): 391
- Time zone: UTC+3 (TRT)

Sorgun is a neighbourhood in the municipality and district of Güdül, Ankara Province, Turkey. Its population is 391 (2022). Before the 2013 reorganisation, it was a town (belde).
