= Aşağıokçular, Çanakkale =

Village in Turkey

Aşağıokçular
- Village
- Location in Turkey Aşağıokçular (Marmara)
- Coordinates: 40.0549°N 26.4578°E
- Country: Turkey
- Province: Çanakkale
- District: Çanakkale
- Population (2021): 259
- Time zone: UTC+3 (TRT)

Aşağıokçular is a village in the Çanakkale District of Çanakkale Province in Turkey. Its population is 259 (2021).
