= Kurşunkaya, Keban =

Village in Turkey

Kurşunkaya
- Village
- Location in Turkey
- Coordinates: 38°44′15″N 38°44′50″E
- Country: Turkey
- Province: Elazığ
- District: Keban
- Population (2021): 17
- Time zone: UTC+3 (TRT)

Kurşunkaya (Kurdish: Kurdikan) is a village in the Keban District of Elazığ Province in Turkey. Its population is 17 (2021). The village is populated by Kurds.
