= Altınkürek, Keban =

Village in Elazığ Province, Turkey

Altınkürek
- Village
- Location in Turkey
- Coordinates: 38.660°N 38.824°E
- Country: Turkey
- Province: Elazığ
- District: Keban
- Population (2021): 192
- Time zone: UTC+3 (TRT)

Altınkürek (Kurdish: Xozikan) is a village in the Keban District of Elazığ Province in Turkey. The village is populated by Kurds of the Parçikan tribe and had a population of 192 in 2021.

The hamlet of Derince is attached to the village.
