= Topkıran, Keban =

Village in Turkey

Topkıran
- Village
- Location in Turkey
- Coordinates: 38°44′6″N 38°34′18″E
- Country: Turkey
- Province: Elazığ
- District: Keban
- Population (2021): 38
- Time zone: UTC+3 (TRT)

Topkıran is a village in the Keban District of Elazığ Province in Turkey. Its population is 38 (2021). The village is populated by Turkmens.
