= Serçiler, Çanakkale =

Village in Turkey

Serçiler
- Village
- Location in Turkey Serçiler (Marmara)
- Coordinates: 40°03′N 26°36′E
- Country: Turkey
- Province: Çanakkale
- District: Çanakkale
- Population (2021): 228
- Time zone: UTC+3 (TRT)

Serçiler is a village in the Çanakkale District of Çanakkale Province in Turkey. Its population is 228 as of 2021.
