= Örenyaka, Keban =

Village in Elazığ Province, Turkey

Örenyaka
- Village
- Location in Turkey
- Coordinates: 38.688°N 38.741°E
- Country: Turkey
- Province: Elazığ
- District: Keban
- Population (2021): 23
- Time zone: UTC+3 (TRT)

Örenyaka (Kurdish: Çendikan) is a village in the Keban District of Elazığ Province in Turkey. The village is populated by Kurds of the Zirkan tribe and had a population of 23 in 2021.
