= Çağa, Güdül =

Çağa
- Neighbourhood
- Location in Turkey Çağa (Turkey Central Anatolia)
- Coordinates: 40.1271°N 32.2136°E
- Country: Turkey
- Province: Ankara
- District: Güdül
- Population (2022): 502
- Time zone: UTC+3 (TRT)

Çağa is a neighbourhood in the municipality and district of Güdül, Ankara Province, Turkey. Its population is 502 (2022). Before the 2013 reorganisation, it was a town (belde).
