= Bodurlar, Çanakkale =

Village in Turkey

Bodurlar
- Village
- Location in Turkey Bodurlar (Marmara)
- Coordinates: 40.1106°N 26.6437°E
- Country: Turkey
- Province: Çanakkale
- District: Çanakkale
- Population (2021): 80
- Time zone: UTC+3 (TRT)

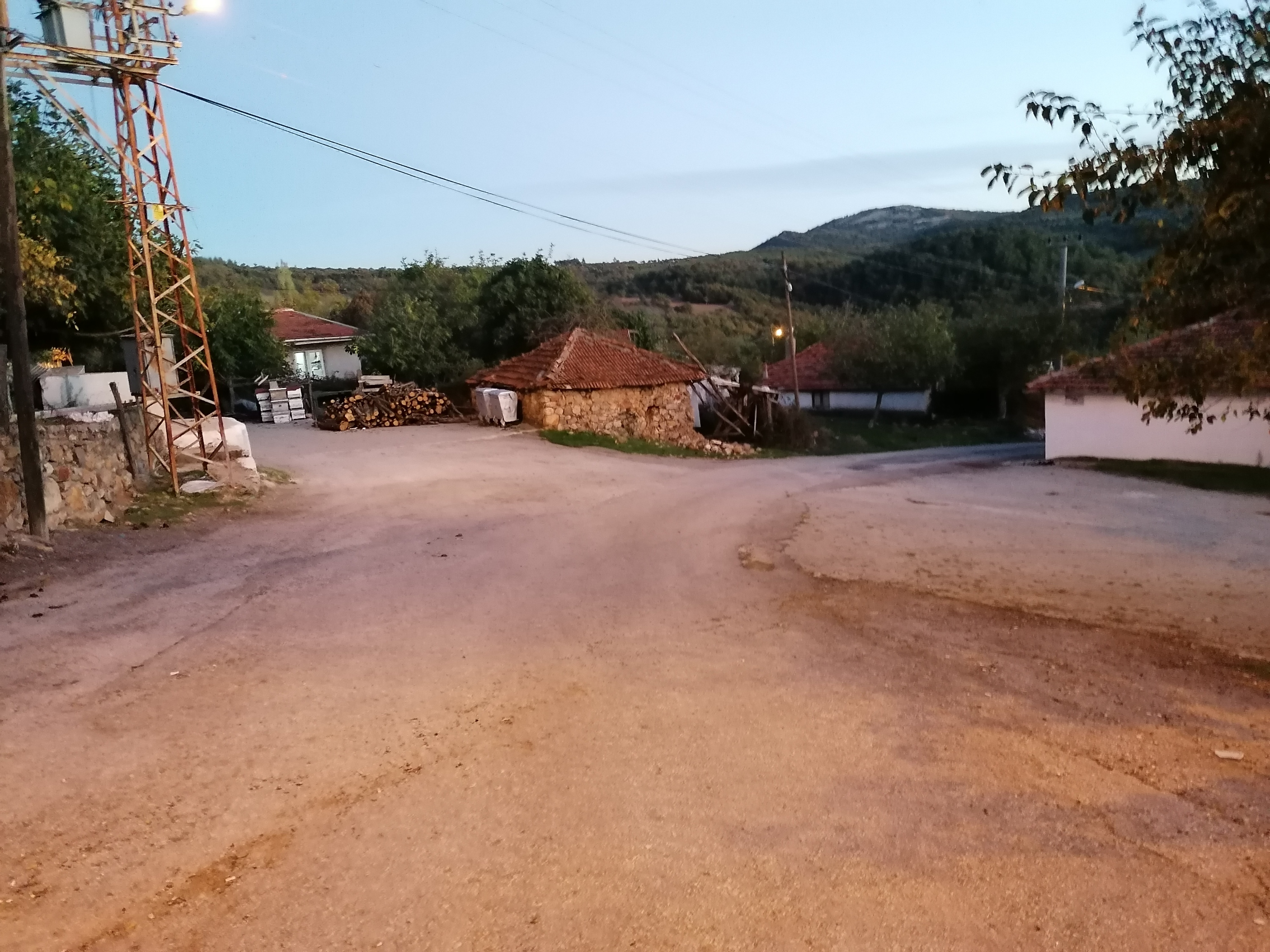
Bodurlar village center

Bodurlar is a village in the Çanakkale District of Çanakkale Province in Turkey. Its population is 80 (2021).
