= Çınarlı, Çanakkale =

Village in Turkey

Çınarlı
- Village
- Location in Turkey Çınarlı (Marmara)
- Coordinates: 40.0533°N 26.3897°E
- Country: Turkey
- Province: Çanakkale
- District: Çanakkale
- Population (2021): 1,817
- Time zone: UTC+3 (TRT)

Çınarlı (formerly: Kos) is a village in the Çanakkale District of Çanakkale Province in Turkey. Its population is 1,817 (2021).
