= Çukurören, Güdül =

Çukurören
- Neighbourhood
- Location in Turkey Çukurören (Turkey Central Anatolia)
- Coordinates: 40.1835°N 32.3444°E
- Country: Turkey
- Province: Ankara
- District: Güdül
- Population (2022): 167
- Time zone: UTC+3 (TRT)

Çukurören is a neighbourhood in the municipality and district of Güdül, Ankara Province, Turkey. Its population is 167 (2022).
