= Büklümlü, Keban =

Village in Turkey

Büklümlü
- Village
- Location in Turkey
- Coordinates: 38°49′N 38°48′E
- Country: Turkey
- Province: Elazığ
- District: Keban
- Population (2021): 67
- Time zone: UTC+3 (TRT)

Büklümlü (Kurdish: Mişeliya Jêrîn) is a village in the Keban District of Elazığ Province in Turkey. Its population is 67 (2021).
