= Kalabaklı, Çanakkale =

Village in Turkey

Kalabaklı
- Village
- Location in Turkey Kalabaklı (Marmara)
- Coordinates: 40°05′03″N 26°25′10″E
- Country: Turkey
- Province: Çanakkale
- District: Çanakkale
- Population (2021): 257
- Time zone: UTC+3 (TRT)

Kalabaklı is a village in the Çanakkale District of Çanakkale Province in Turkey. Its population is 257 (2021).
