= Sağdıçlar, Keban =

Village in Turkey

Sağdıçlar
- Village
- Location in Turkey
- Coordinates: 38°47′N 38°50′E
- Country: Turkey
- Province: Elazığ
- District: Keban
- Population (2021): 186
- Time zone: UTC+3 (TRT)

Sağdıçlar (Kurdish: Hemzîkan) is a village in the Keban District of Elazığ Province in Turkey. Its population is 186 (2021).
