= Hacılar, Güdül =

Hacılar
- Neighbourhood
- Location in Turkey Hacılar (Turkey Central Anatolia)
- Coordinates: 40.2245°N 32.2771°E
- Country: Turkey
- Province: Ankara
- District: Güdül
- Population (2022): 86
- Time zone: UTC+3 (TRT)

Hacılar is a neighbourhood in the municipality and district of Güdül, Ankara Province, Turkey. Its population is 86 (2022).
