= Kadıobası, Güdül =

Kadıobası
- Neighbourhood
- Location in Turkey Kadıobası (Turkey Central Anatolia)
- Coordinates: 40.1341°N 32.2686°E
- Country: Turkey
- Province: Ankara
- District: Güdül
- Population (2022): 112
- Time zone: UTC+3 (TRT)

Kadıobası is a neighbourhood in the municipality and district of Güdül, Ankara Province, Turkey. Its population is 112 (2022).
