= Akgömlek, Keban =

Village in Turkey

Akgömlek
- Village
- Location in Turkey
- Coordinates: 38°41′N 38°49′E
- Country: Turkey
- Province: Elazığ
- District: Keban
- Population (2021): 37
- Time zone: UTC+3 (TRT)

Akgömlek (Kurdish: Goma Piran) is a village in the Keban District of Elazığ Province in Turkey. Its population is 37 (2021).
