= Maraşal Fevzi Çakmak, Çanakkale =

Village in Turkey

Maraşal Fevzi Çakmak
- Village
- Location in Turkey Maraşal Fevzi Çakmak (Marmara)
- Coordinates: 40°08′N 26°35′E
- Country: Turkey
- Province: Çanakkale
- District: Çanakkale
- Population (2021): 209
- Time zone: UTC+3 (TRT)

Maraşal Fevzi Çakmak is a village in the Çanakkale District of Çanakkale Province in Turkey. Its population is 209 (2021). The village was named after field marshal and politician Fevzi Çakmak.
