= Kurşunlu, Çanakkale =

Village in Turkey

Kurşunlu
- Village
- Location in Turkey Kurşunlu (Marmara)
- Coordinates: 40.1397°N 26.4972°E
- Country: Turkey
- Province: Çanakkale
- District: Çanakkale
- Population (2021): 449
- Time zone: UTC+3 (TRT)

Kurşunlu is a village in the Çanakkale District of Çanakkale Province in Turkey. Its population is 449 (2021).
