= Kayı, Güdül =

Kayı
- Neighbourhood
- Location in Turkey Kayı (Turkey Central Anatolia)
- Coordinates: 40.2645°N 32.1822°E
- Country: Turkey
- Province: Ankara
- District: Güdül
- Population (2022): 90
- Time zone: UTC+3 (TRT)

Kayı is a neighbourhood in the municipality and district of Güdül, Ankara Province, Turkey. Its population is 90 (2022).
