= Beydeğirmeni, Keban =

Village in Turkey

Beydeğirmeni
- Village
- Location in Turkey
- Coordinates: 38.6956°N 38.8134°E
- Country: Turkey
- Province: Elazığ
- District: Keban
- Population (2021): 87
- Time zone: UTC+3 (TRT)

Beydeğirmeni (Kurdish: Mılilan) is a village in the Keban District of Elazığ Province in Turkey. Its population is 87 (2021).
