= Yağcılar =

Tağcılar is a Turkish word meaning "oilers". (In slang it may mean "flatterers".) It may refer to:

== People with the surname ==
- Mahir Yağcılar (born 1961), Turkish Kosovar politician

== Places ==
- Yağcılar, Aydın, a village in Central district of Aydın Province, Turkey
- Yağcılar, Çanakkale
- Yağcılar, Çine, a village in Çine district of Aydın Province, Turkey
- Yağcılar, Kargı
- Yağcılar, Yığılca
- Yağcılar, Yusufeli, a village in Yusufeli district of Artvin Province, Turkey

== See also ==
- Yağcılar (disambiguation)
