= Tahtacıörencik, Güdül =

Tahtacıörencik
- Neighbourhood
- Location in Turkey Tahtacıörencik (Turkey Central Anatolia)
- Coordinates: 40°17′N 32°08′E
- Country: Turkey
- Province: Ankara
- District: Güdül
- Population (2022): 205
- Time zone: UTC+3 (TRT)

Tahtacıörencik is a neighborhood in the municipality and district of Güdül, Ankara Province, Turkey. Its population is 205 (2022).

== Name ==
The name of the place appears in Ottoman and Republic records as Tahtacıörencik (1695-96), Tahtacı Viran (1753-54), Tahtacıvirancık (1928), and Tahtacıörencik (1980). Tahtacıörencik means literally "little ruin of the woodworker (or Tahtacı)" (Turkish: tahtacı + ören + -cik).
