= Cremaste =

Town in ancient Troad

Coordinates: 40°05′25″N 26°31′46″E

Cremaste or Kremaste (Ancient Greek: Κρεμαστή) was a town in ancient Troad. Xenophon speaks of the town and the plain nearby "where there are the gold mines of the Abydeni." Strabo mentions the gold mines of Astyra which town is nearby. Gold mines belonging to Lampsacus are mentioned by Pliny the Elder and by Polyaenus; and they may be the same as those of Cremaste, as the town was generally between Abydus and Lampsacus.

Its site is located near Sarıbeyle, Asiatic Turkey.
