= Taşkesen, Keban =

Village in Turkey

Taşkesen
- Village
- Location in Turkey
- Coordinates: 38°48′36″N 38°50′55″E
- Country: Turkey
- Province: Elazığ
- District: Keban
- Population (2021): 74
- Time zone: UTC+3 (TRT)

Taşkesen (Kurdish: Mışeliya corêne) is a village in the Keban District of Elazığ Province in Turkey. Its population is 74 (2021).
