= Kuşçu, Keban =

Village in Turkey

Kuşçu
- Village
- Location in Turkey
- Coordinates: 38°43′11″N 38°44′54″E
- Country: Turkey
- Province: Elazığ
- District: Keban
- Population (2021): 42
- Time zone: UTC+3 (TRT)

Kuşçu is a village in the Keban District of Elazığ Province in Turkey. Its population is 42 (2021). The village is populated by Turkmens.
