= Güzel, Güdül =

Güzel
- Neighbourhood
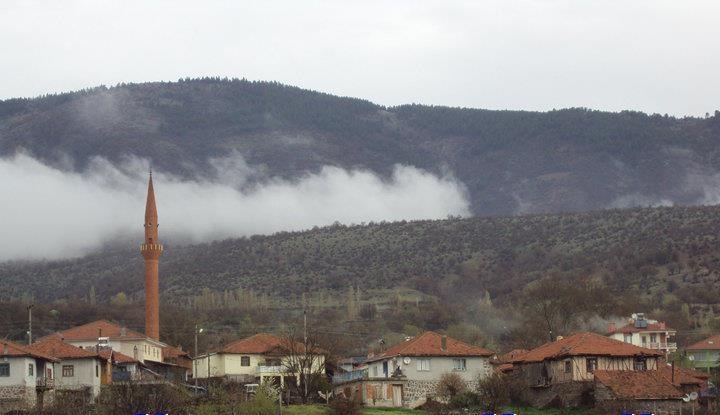

- Location within Turkey Location within Turkey Central Anatolia
- Coordinates: 40.2816°N 32.3067°E
- Country: Turkey
- Province: Ankara
- District: Güdül
- Population (2022): 137
- Time zone: UTC+3 (TRT)

Güzel is a neighbourhood in the municipality and district of Güdül, Ankara Province, Turkey. Its population is 137 (2022).
