= Dürümlü, Keban =

Village in Turkey

Dürümlü
- Village
- Location in Turkey
- Coordinates: 38°52′46″N 38°44′1″E
- Country: Turkey
- Province: Elazığ
- District: Keban
- Population (2021): 72
- Time zone: UTC+3 (TRT)

Dürümlü (Kurdish: Mınayık) is a village in the Keban District of Elazığ Province in Turkey. Its population is 72 (2021).
