= Bölükçalı, Keban =

Village in Turkey

Bölükçalı
- Village
- Location within Turkey
- Coordinates: 38°46′N 38°54′E
- Country: Turkey
- Province: Elazığ
- District: Keban
- Population (2021): 26
- Time zone: UTC+3 (TRT)

Bölükçalı (Kurdish: Hacîsor) is a village in the Keban District of Elazığ Province in Turkey. Its population is 26 (2021).
