= Sarıcaeli, Çanakkale =

Village in Turkey

Sarıcaeli
- Village
- Location in Turkey Sarıcaeli (Marmara)
- Coordinates: 40°07′19″N 26°26′36″E
- Country: Turkey
- Province: Çanakkale
- District: Çanakkale
- Population (2021): 544
- Time zone: UTC+3 (TRT)

Sarıcaeli is a village in the Çanakkale District of Çanakkale Province in Turkey. Its population is 544 (2021).
