= Kamanlar, Güdül =

Kamanlar
- Neighbourhood
- Location in Turkey Kamanlar (Turkey Central Anatolia)
- Coordinates: 40°14′N 32°16′E
- Country: Turkey
- Province: Ankara
- District: Güdül
- Population (2022): 163
- Time zone: UTC+3 (TRT)

Kamanlar is a neighbourhood in the municipality and district of Güdül, Ankara Province, Turkey. Its population is 163 (2022).
