= Üçpınar, Keban =

Village in Elazığ Province, Turkey

Üçpınar
- Village
- Location in Turkey
- Coordinates: 38.665°N 38.690°E
- Country: Turkey
- Province: Elazığ
- District: Keban
- Population (2021): 69
- Time zone: UTC+3 (TRT)

Üçpınar (formerly Kiliruşağı) (Kurdish: Giliran) is a village in the Keban District of Elazığ Province in Turkey. The village is populated by Kurds of the Zeyve tribe and had a population of 69 in 2021.
