= Meyvabükü, Güdül =

Meyvabükü
- Neighbourhood
- Location within Turkey Location within Turkey Central Anatolia
- Coordinates: 40°16′N 32°20′E
- Country: Turkey
- Province: Ankara
- District: Güdül
- Population (2022): 69
- Time zone: UTC+3 (TRT)

Meyvabükü is a neighborhood in the municipality and district of Güdül, Ankara Province, Turkey. Its population is 69 (2022).

== Name ==
The name also appears in government records as Meyva Bükü, Meyvebükü, and Meyve Bükü. It means literally "fruit bend" or "fruit thicket" (Turkish: meyva + bük).

== History ==
Meyvabükü was listed as a village of the kaza of Yabanâbâd (Kızılcahamam) in 1835-36. It remained part of this kaza until 1933, when it was added to the nahiye of Güdül in the kaza of Ayaş. Meyvabükü remained a part of Güdül when Güdül was separated from Ayaş in 1957 and made into an ilçe of its own.

== Population ==
The population of Meyvabükü through the years:

- 71 (1935)
- 104 (1940)
- 54 (1980)
- 44 (1985)
- 83 (1990)
- 55 (1997)
- 48 (2000)
- 31 (2007)
- 29 (2008)
