= Özçaltı, Güdül =

Özçaltı
- Neighbourhood
- Location in Turkey Özçaltı (Turkey Central Anatolia)
- Coordinates: 40°17′N 32°22′E
- Country: Turkey
- Province: Ankara
- District: Güdül
- Population (2022): 44
- Time zone: UTC+3 (TRT)

Özçaltı is a neighbourhood in the municipality and district of Güdül, Ankara Province, Turkey. Its population is 44 (2022).
