= Bademli, Keban =

Village in Turkey

Bademli
- Village
- Location in Turkey
- Coordinates: 38.7249°N 38.8031°E
- Country: Turkey
- Province: Elazığ
- District: Keban
- Population (2021): 68
- Time zone: UTC+3 (TRT)

Bademli (Kurdish: Lorikan) is a village in the Keban District of Elazığ Province in Turkey. The village is populated by Kurds and had a population of 68 in 2021.

The hamlet of Yaşar is attached to the village.
