= Kavaközü, Güdül =

Kavaközü
- Neighbourhood
- Location in Turkey Kavaközü (Turkey Central Anatolia)
- Coordinates: 40.2664°N 32.1698°E
- Country: Turkey
- Province: Ankara
- District: Güdül
- Population (2022): 174
- Time zone: UTC+3 (TRT)

Kavaközü is a neighbourhood in the municipality and district of Güdül, Ankara Province, Turkey. Its population is 174 (2022).
