= Kopuzlu, Keban =

Village in Turkey

Kopuzlu
- Village
- Location in Turkey
- Coordinates: 38°51′51″N 38°39′54″E
- Country: Turkey
- Province: Elazığ
- District: Keban
- Population (2021): 59
- Time zone: UTC+3 (TRT)

Kopuzlu (Kurdish: Horenek) is a village in the Keban District of Elazığ Province in Turkey. Its population is 59 (2021).
