= Nimri, Keban =

Village in Turkey

Nimri
- Village
- Location in Turkey
- Coordinates: 38°48′19″N 38°40′59″E
- Country: Turkey
- Province: Elazığ
- District: Keban
- Population (2021): 57
- Time zone: UTC+3 (TRT)

Nimri (formerly: Pınarlar) is a village in the Keban District of Elazığ Province in Turkey. Its population is 57 (2021). The village is populated by Alevi Turkmens.
