= Çalık, Keban =

Village in Turkey

Çalık
- Village
- Location within Turkey
- Coordinates: 38.7794°N 38.7816°E
- Country: Turkey
- Province: Elazığ
- District: Keban
- Population (2021): 86
- Time zone: UTC+3 (TRT)

Çalık is a village in the Keban District of Elazığ Province in Turkey. Its population is 86 (2021). The village is populated by Turkmens.
