= Kale Peuke =

Ancient town of the Troad

Coordinates: 39°47′38″N 26°58′59″E

Kale Peuke (Ancient Greek: Καλὴ πεύκη, 'Beautiful Pine') was a town located in the ancient Troad mentioned by Strabo.

Its site is located north of Gürgen Dağ in Asiatic Turkey.
