= Akçalı, Çanakkale =

Village in Turkey

Akçalı
- Village
- Location in Turkey Akçalı (Marmara)
- Coordinates: 40.0815°N 26.6151°E
- Country: Turkey
- Province: Çanakkale
- District: Çanakkale
- Population (2021): 51
- Time zone: UTC+3 (TRT)

Akçalı is a village in the Çanakkale District of Çanakkale Province in Turkey. Its population is 51 (2021).
