= Yağcılar, Çanakkale =

Village in Turkey

Yağcılar
- Village
- Location in Turkey Yağcılar (Marmara)
- Coordinates: 40°05′10″N 26°27′14″E
- Country: Turkey
- Province: Çanakkale
- District: Çanakkale
- Population (2021): 127
- Time zone: UTC+3 (TRT)

Yağcılar is a village in the Çanakkale District of Çanakkale Province in Turkey. Its population is 127 (2021).
