= Gordus (Lydia) =

Ancient town in Lydia

Coordinates: 38°52′36″N 28°18′51″E

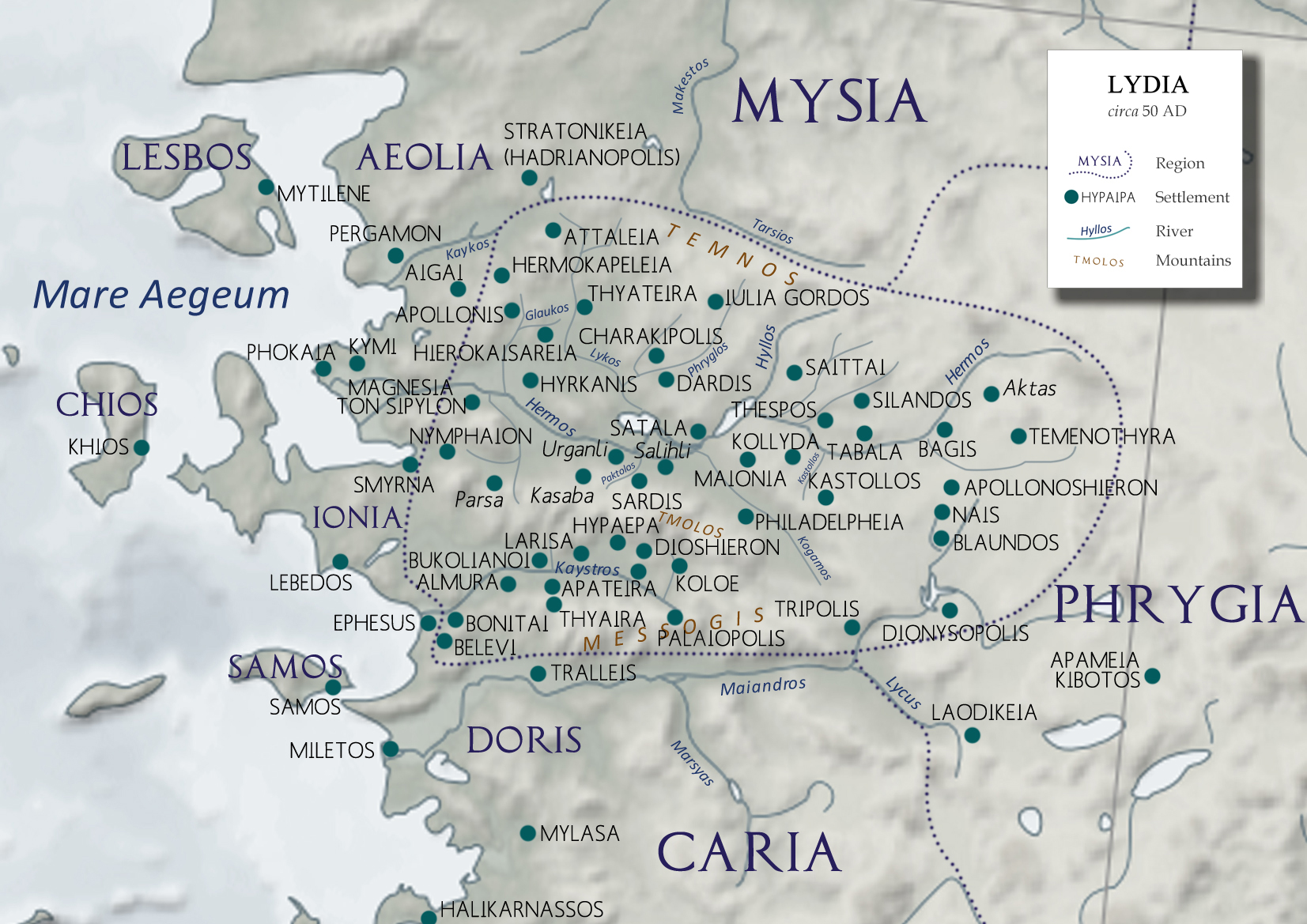
Julia Gordos among the cities of Lydia (ca. 50 AD)

Gordus or Gordos (Ancient Greek: Γόρδος), also known as Julia Gordus or Iulia Gordos, and possibly also known as Porotta, was an ancient Greek city located in eastern Lydia (modern western Turkey). It was a strategically important town founded by the Seleucid Kings. The Julio-Claudian emperors of the Roman Empire renamed the city Julia Gordos in the 1st century and the city minted its own coins.

The city achieved the full status of a polis under the Flavian emperors.

It was the home to Apollophanes the physician, and there is epigraphical evidence of both pagans and Christians in the town.

Three bishops of the town are known: Isidor attended Third Council of Constantinople, Neophytus attended the Second Council of Nicaea and Stephen attended the Photian Council of 870. No longer the seat of a residential bishop, it remains a titular see of the Roman Catholic Church.

Its site is located near Eski Gördes in Asiatic Turkey.
