= Taşören, Güdül =

Taşören
- Neighbourhood
- Location in Turkey Taşören (Turkey Central Anatolia)
- Coordinates: 40.2038°N 32.1448°E
- Country: Turkey
- Province: Ankara
- District: Güdül
- Population (2022): 86
- Time zone: UTC+3 (TRT)

Taşören is a neighbourhood in the municipality and district of Güdül, Ankara Province, Turkey. Its population is 86 (2022). The village is mentioned in an Ottoman defter of 1523 under the name Kalta and under the same name in a government publication of 1957.

== History ==
In the Roman era, there was reportedly a fortress where the village is now.

According to one story, the village was founded by a Galat Bey and servant, who came from Galata in Istanbul; thus the village was also known in the past as "Galta" or "Galtabeyi."

In the 16th century, the village was listed among those villages whose income was allocated to sipahis under the Ottoman timar system.

== Population ==
In 1845, the village had 28 households, with an estimated population of 140. In 2021, it had 80 inhabitants in winter, 150 in summer.

Historical population
Year	Pop.	±% p.a.
1980	215	—
1985	163	−5.39%
1990	145	−2.31%
1997	79	−8.31%
2000	89	+4.05%
2007	64	−4.60%
2012	69	+1.52%
2017	67	−0.59%
2022	86	+5.12%
Source: Arslan (1980–2000) and TÜIK (2007-2022)
