= Akçatepe, Keban =

Village in Elazığ Province, Turkey

Akçatepe
- Village
- Location in Turkey
- Coordinates: 38.712°N 38.641°E
- Country: Turkey
- Province: Elazığ
- District: Keban
- Population (2021): 159
- Time zone: UTC+3 (TRT)

Akçatepe (Kurdish: Zirkî Şeyxemîr) is a village in the Keban District of Elazığ Province in Turkey. The village is populated by Kurds of the Zirkan tribe and had a population of 159 in 2021.
