= Ulupınar, Keban =

Village in Turkey

Ulupınar
- Village
- Location in Turkey
- Coordinates: 38°44′27″N 38°51′11″E
- Country: Turkey
- Province: Elazığ
- District: Keban
- Population (2021): 149
- Time zone: UTC+3 (TRT)

Ulupınar (Kurdish: Birvan) is a village in the Keban District of Elazığ Province in Turkey. Its population is 149 (2021). The village is populated by Kurds.
