= Musaköy, Çanakkale =

Village in Turkey

Musaköy
- Village
- Country: Turkey
- Province: Çanakkale
- District: Çanakkale
- Population (2021): 164
- Time zone: UTC+3 (TRT)

Musaköy is a village in the Çanakkale District of Çanakkale Province in Turkey. Its population is 164 (2021).
