= Sapanlı, Güdül =

Sapanlı
- Neighbourhood
- Location in Turkey Sapanlı (Turkey Central Anatolia)
- Coordinates: 40.1847°N 32.2486°E
- Country: Turkey
- Province: Ankara
- District: Güdül
- Population (2022): 91
- Time zone: UTC+3 (TRT)

Sapanlı is a neighbourhood in the municipality and district of Güdül, Ankara Province, Turkey. Its population is 91 (2022).
