= Işıklar, Çanakkale =

Village in Turkey

Işıklar
- Village
- Location in Turkey Işıklar (Marmara)
- Coordinates: 40°8′55″N 26°29′47″E
- Country: Turkey
- Province: Çanakkale
- District: Çanakkale
- Population (2021): 1,522
- Time zone: UTC+3 (TRT)

Işıklar is a village in the Çanakkale District of Çanakkale Province in Turkey. Its population is 1,522 (2021).
