= Karaca Island =

Island in Turkey

Native name: Karaca Adası
- Location within Turkey

Geography
- Location: Aegean Sea
- Coordinates: 36°57′39″N 28°11′46″E
- Area: 01 km^{2} (0.39 sq mi)

Administration
- Turkey
- İl (province): Muğla Province
- İlçe: Marmaris

Karaca Island (Turkish: Karaca Ada) is an Aegean island of Turkey.

Karaca island is named after the village facing the island. At 36°57′39″N 28°11′46″E it is administratively a part of Marmaris ilçe (district) of Muğla Province. . It is situated in the Gulf of Gökova and about 400 metres (1,300 ft) to mainland (Anatolia). Famous Sedir Island is to the north of Karaca Island. Its area is 381×10^{3} square metres (4.10×10^{6} sq ft).

The island belongs to a Turkish family. Recently, the owners put the island on the market. But the island is an archaeological site and there are serious objections against this sale.
