= Çıplak, Çanakkale =

Village in Turkey

Çıplak
- Village
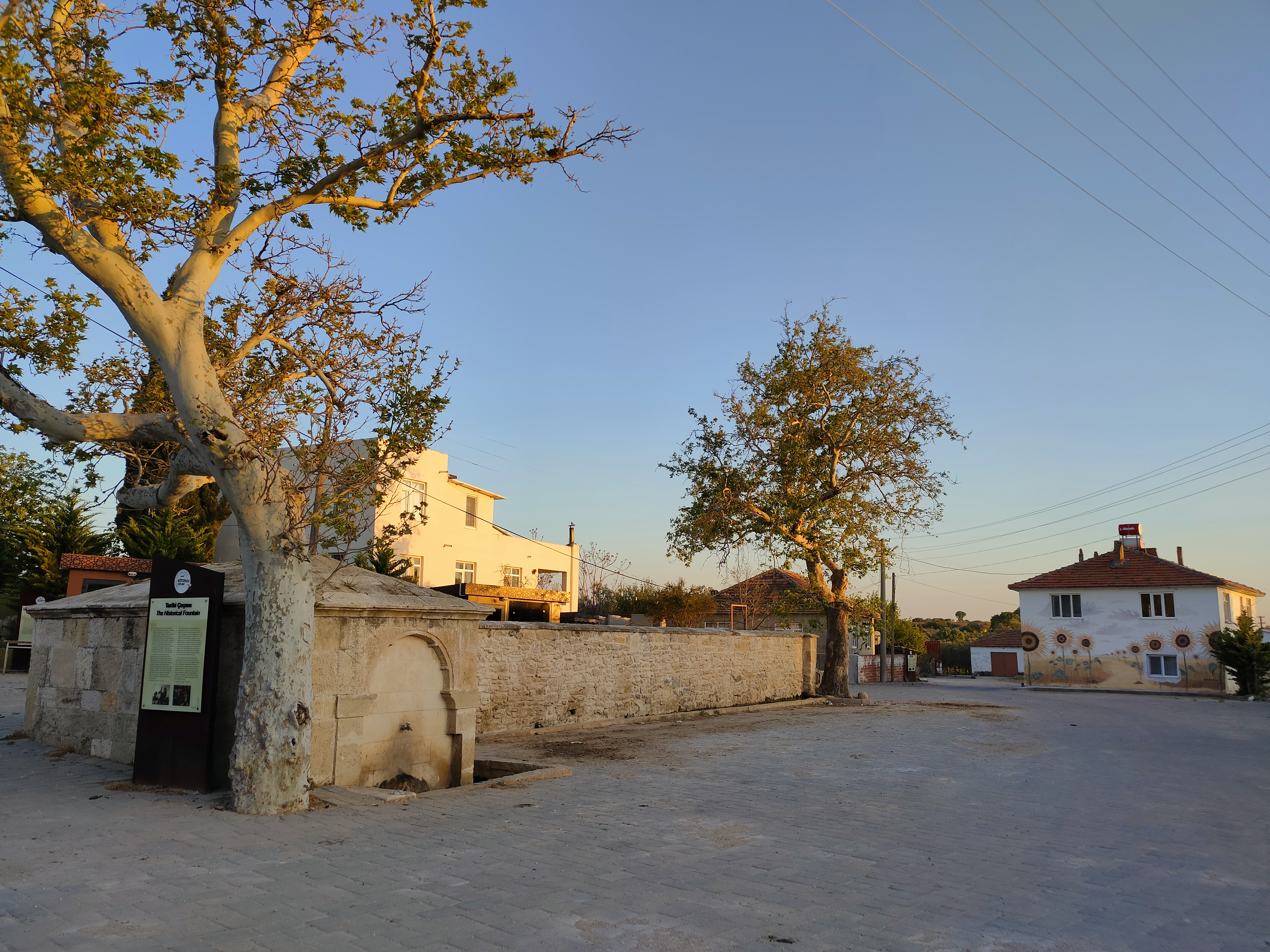

- Location within Turkey Location within Marmara
- Country: Turkey
- Province: Çanakkale
- District: Çanakkale
- Population (2021): 297
- Time zone: UTC+3 (TRT)

Çıplak is a village in the Çanakkale District of Çanakkale Province in Turkey. Its population is 297 people (2021).
