= Kırkkavak, Güdül =

Kırkkavak
- Neighbourhood
- Location in Turkey Kırkkavak (Turkey Central Anatolia)
- Coordinates: 40.2852°N 32.1610°E
- Country: Turkey
- Province: Ankara
- District: Güdül
- Population (2022): 92
- Time zone: UTC+3 (TRT)

Kırkkavak is a neighbourhood in the municipality and district of Güdül, Ankara Province, Turkey. Its population is 92 (2022).
