= Akçapınar, Çanakkale =

Village in Turkey

Akçapınar
- Village
- Location in Turkey Akçapınar (Marmara)
- Coordinates: 39.9269°N 26.3224°E
- Country: Turkey
- Province: Çanakkale
- District: Çanakkale
- Population (2021): 531
- Time zone: UTC+3 (TRT)

Akçapınar is a village in the Çanakkale District of Çanakkale Province in Turkey. Its population is 531 (2021).
