= Güdül =

- District and municipality
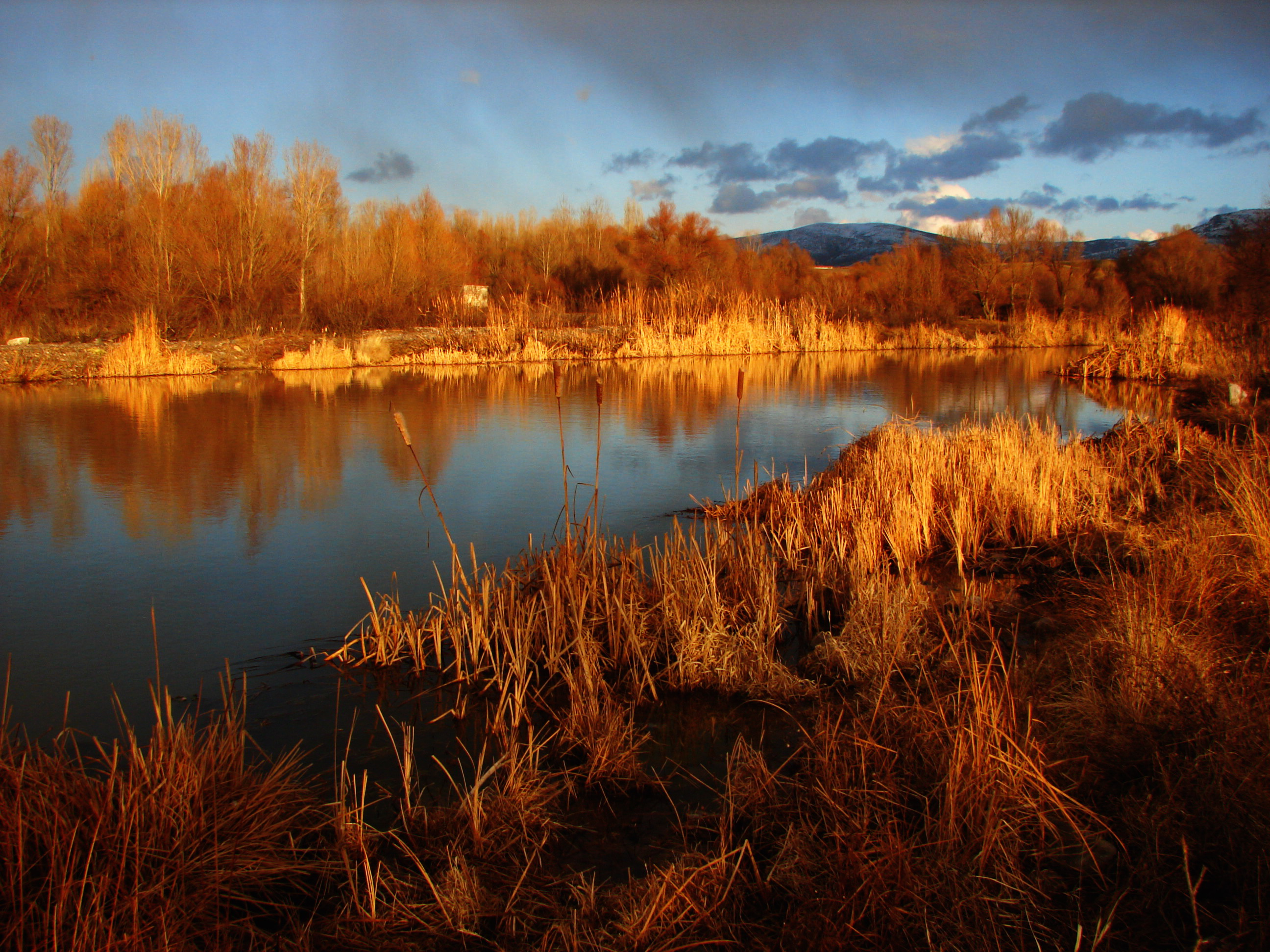
- A nature scene from Güdül

- Map showing Güdül District in Ankara Province

- Location within Turkey Location within Turkey Central Anatolia
- Coordinates: 40°12′40″N 32°14′34″E
- Country: Turkey
- Province: Ankara

Government
  - Mayor: Muzaffer Yalçın (AKP)
- Area: 540 km^{2} (210 sq mi)
- Elevation: 720 m (2,360 ft)
- Population (2022): 8,079
  - Density: 15/km^{2} (39/sq mi)
- Time zone: UTC+3 (TRT)
- Postal code: 06840
- Area code: 0312
- Website: gudul.bel.tr

Güdül is a municipality and district of Ankara Province, Turkey. Its area is 540 km^{2}, and its population is 8,079 (2022). It is 90 km north-west of the city of Ankara, off the motorway to Istanbul.

Güdül is a mountainous district with a dry climate featuring cold winters (down to -20 °C), hot summers (up to 35 °C) and a little rain in spring and autumn. There is some agriculture and the crops include hot peppers and chick peas, which are dried and sold as leblebi.

== History ==
Research shows occupation since prehistoric times, and caves along the river Kirmir contain stone workings apparently by the Hittites (2000 BC). Later the area was occupied by Phrygians, Ancient Romans and Byzantines (one of the caves has a carved cross from the early spread of Christianity under Roman rule).

In 1071, the Byzantine armies were defeated by the Turks at the battle of Malazgirt, and soon afterwards all of central Anatolia came under Turkish control. Güdül was occupied by Seljuk Turks, including the lord of Ankara, Şehabüldevle Güdül Bey.

== Composition ==
There are 31 neighbourhoods in Güdül District:

- Adalıkuzu
- Afşar
- Akbaş
- Akçakese
- Aşağı
- Boyalı
- Çağa
- Çukurören
- Emirler
- Garipçe
- Güneyce
- Güzel
- Hacılar
- Kadıobası
- Kamanlar
- Karacaören
- Kavaközü
- Kayı
- Kırkkavak
- Meyvabükü
- Özçaltı
- Özköy
- Salihler
- Sapanlı
- Sorgun
- Tahtacıörencik
- Taşören
- Yelli
- Yeni
- Yeşilöz
- Yukarı

== Places of interest ==
- The lake and forest near the village of Sorgun, north of Güdül
- The caves in the valley of the Kirmir

== Image gallery ==
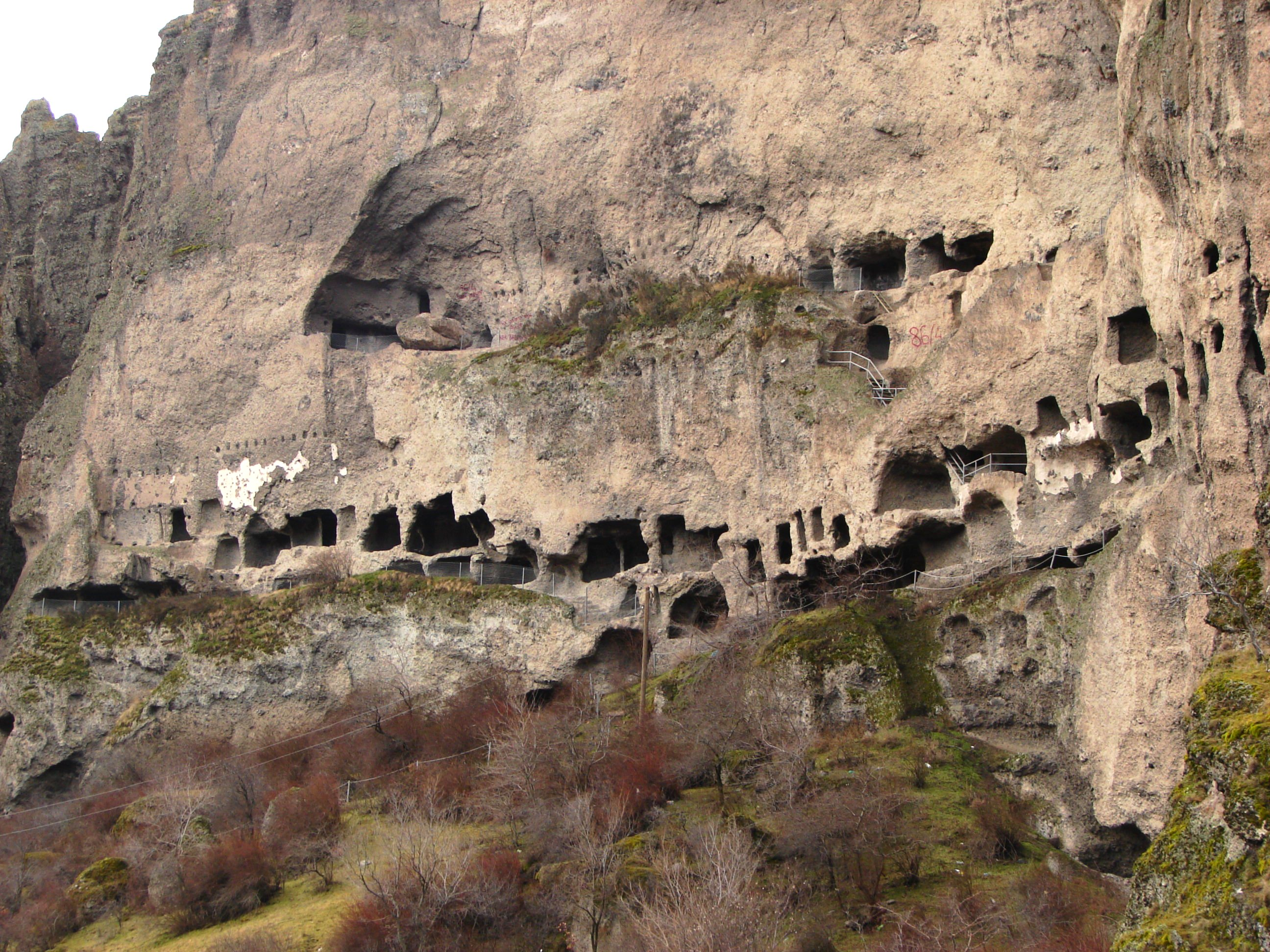
Man made caves

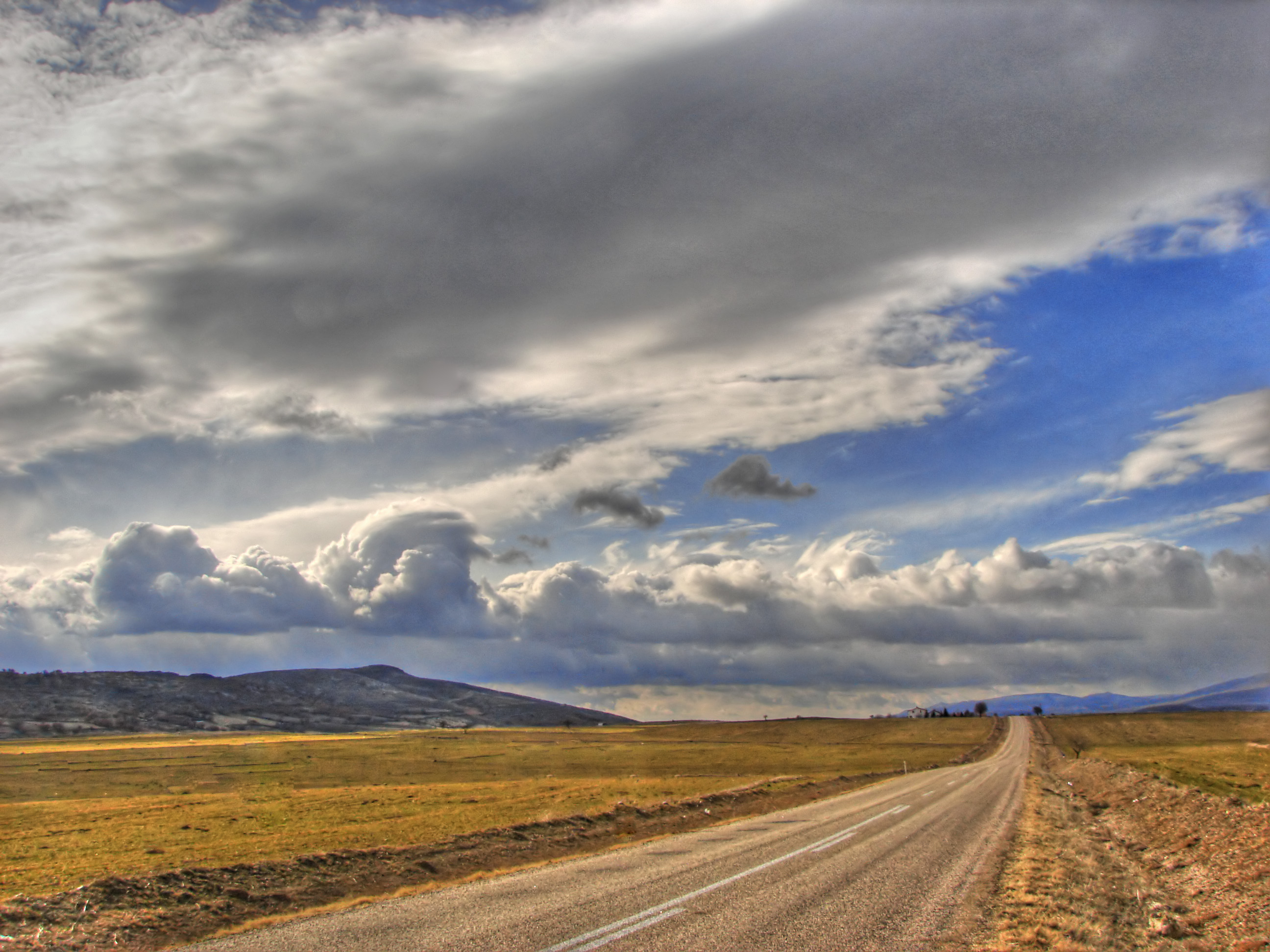
A road in Güdül

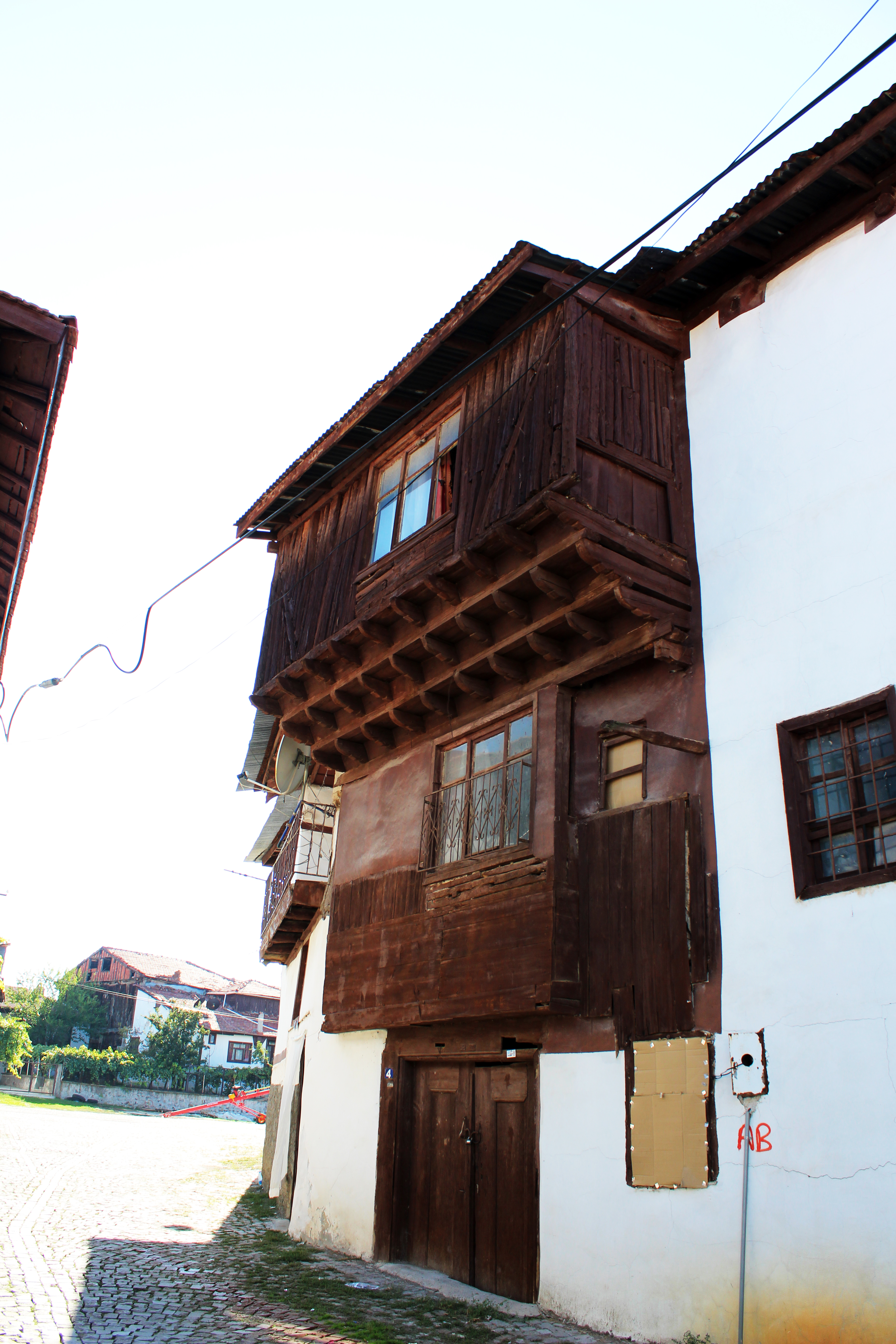
Traditional house

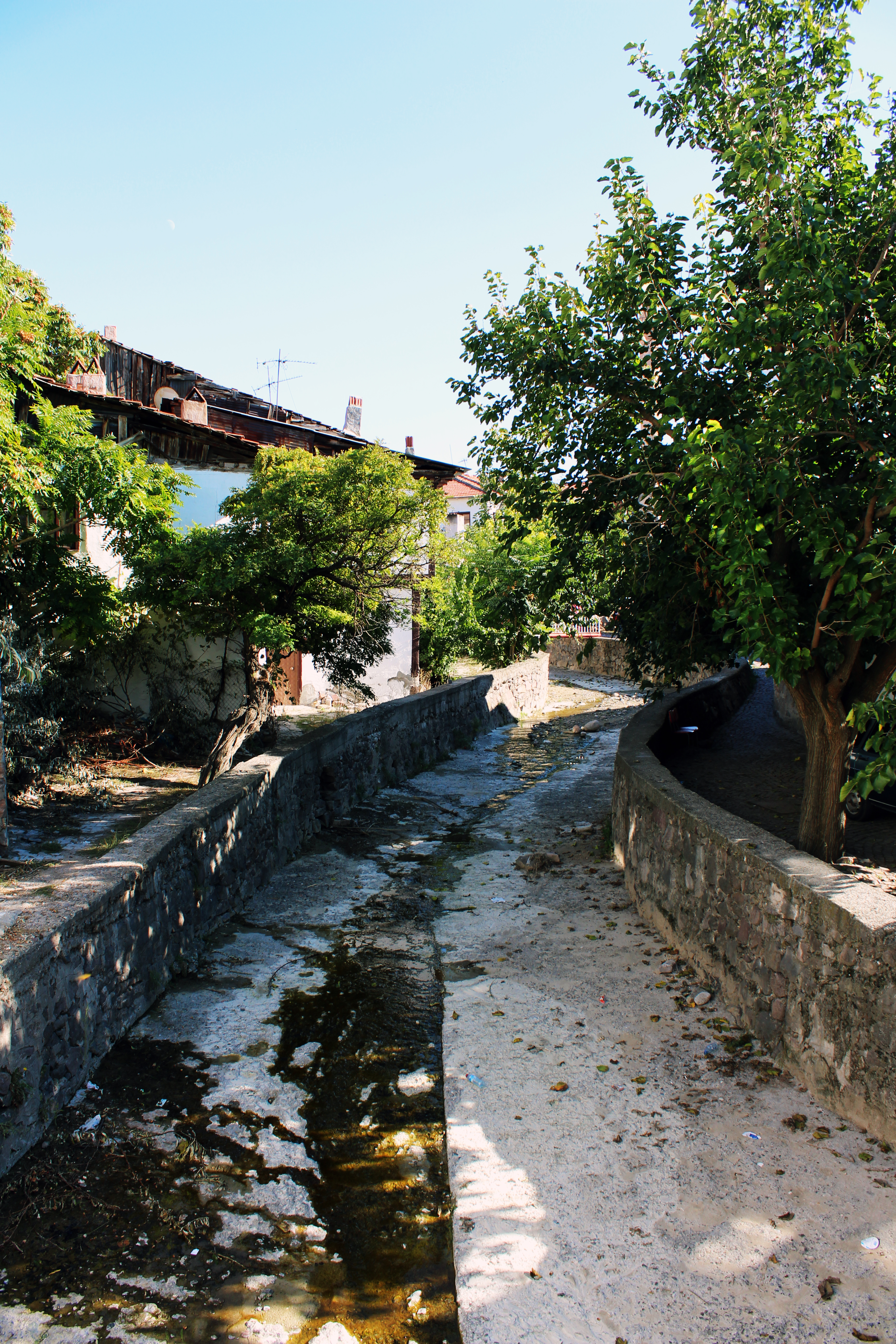
A stream flowing through Güdül

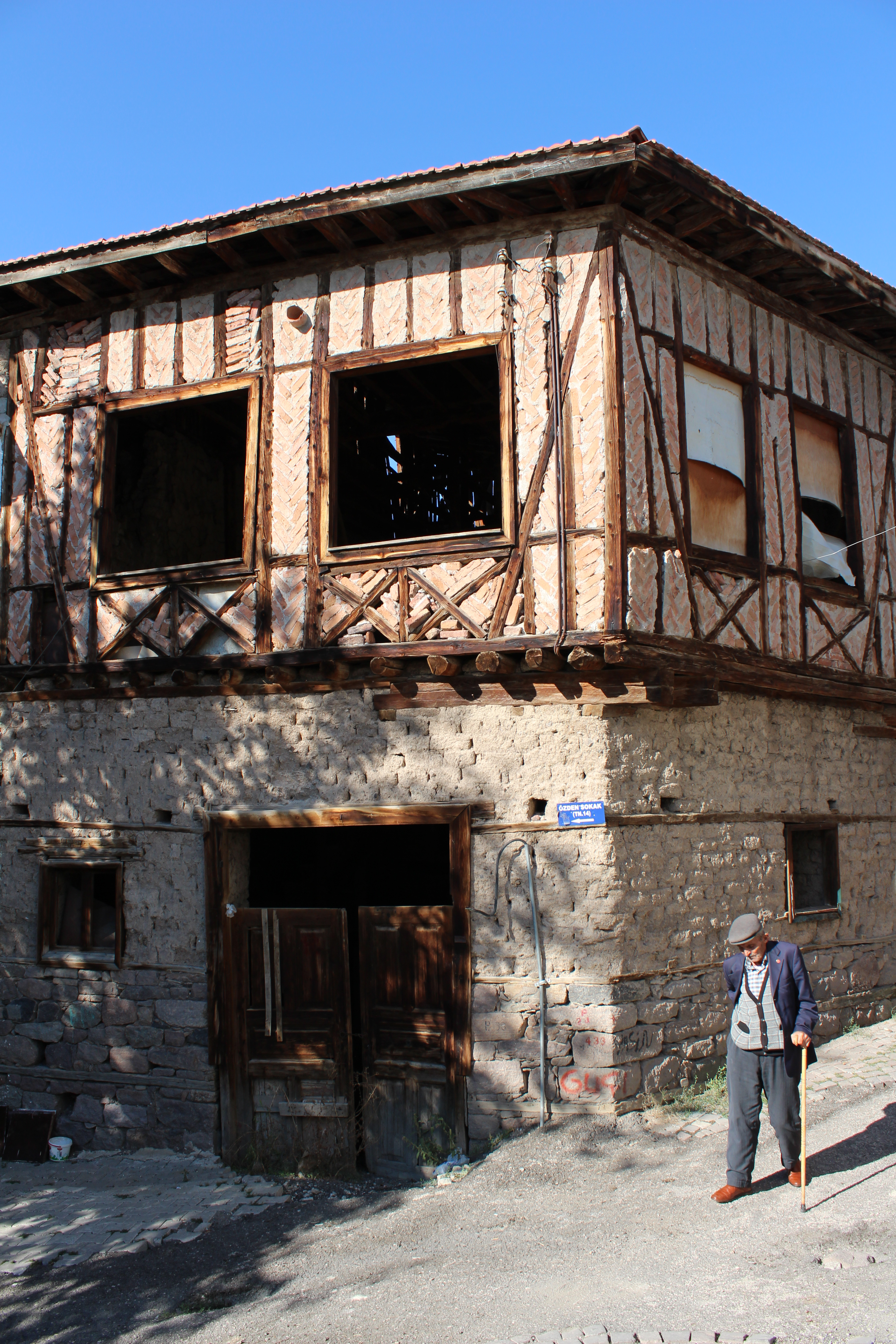
An empty traditional house in Güdül

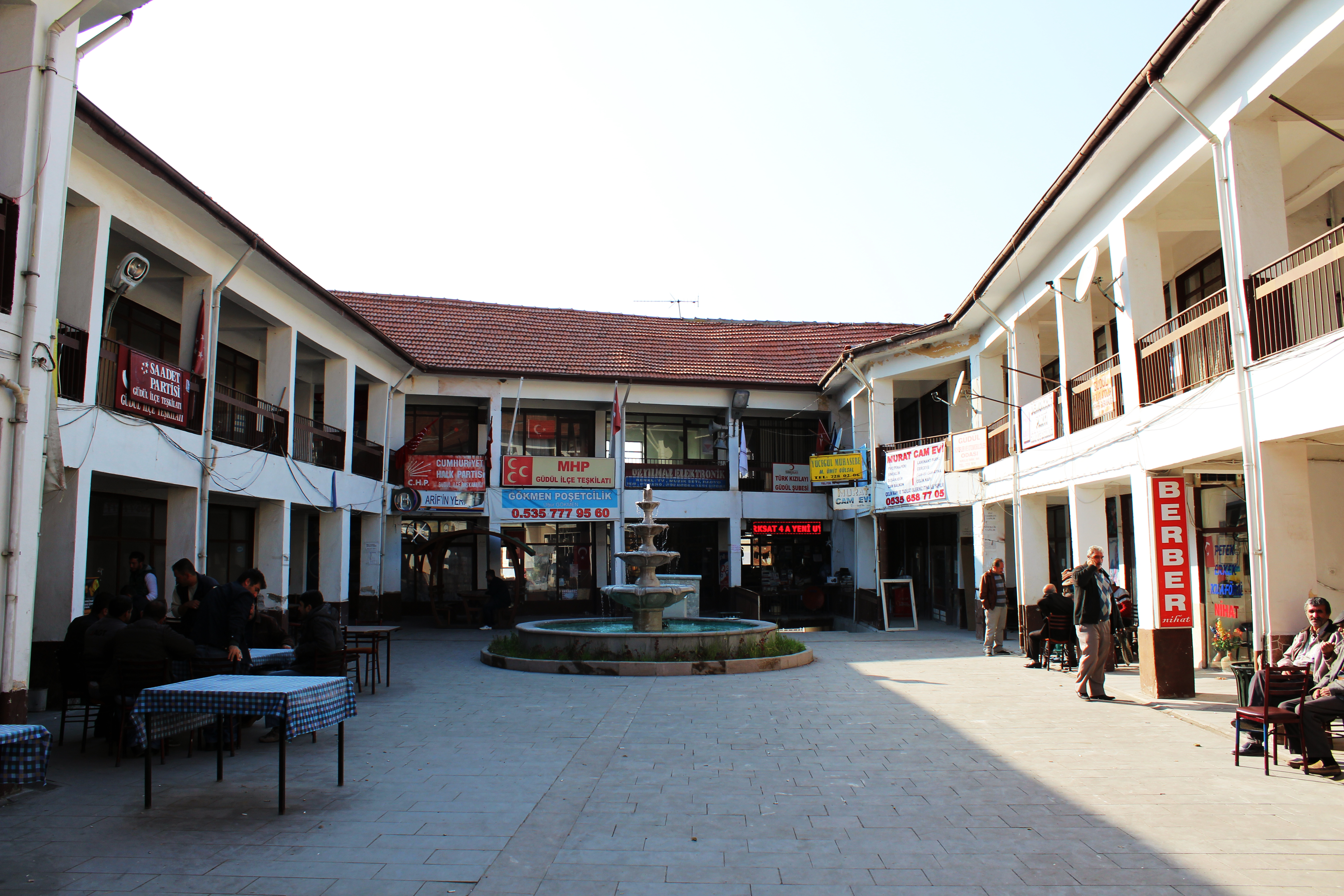
View of the courtyard from Güdül town center
