= Denizli, Keban =

Village in Turkey

Denizli
- Village
- Location in Turkey
- Coordinates: 38°50′12″N 38°40′54″E
- Country: Turkey
- Province: Elazığ
- District: Keban
- Population (2021): 93
- Time zone: UTC+3 (TRT)

Denizli is a village in the Keban District of Elazığ Province in Turkey. Its population is 93 (2021). The village is populated by Turkmens.
