= Kızılkeçili, Çanakkale =

Village in Turkey

Kızılkeçili
- Village
- Location in Turkey Kızılkeçili (Marmara)
- Coordinates: 40°11′26″N 26°35′0″E
- Country: Turkey
- Province: Çanakkale
- District: Çanakkale
- Population (2021): 192
- Time zone: UTC+3 (TRT)

Kızılkeçili is a village in the Çanakkale District of Çanakkale Province in Turkey. Its population is 192 (2021).
