= Güzelyalı, Çanakkale =

Village in Turkey

Güzelyalı
- Village
- Location within Turkey Location within Marmara
- Coordinates: 40°2′42″N 26°20′52″E
- Country: Turkey
- Province: Çanakkale
- District: Çanakkale
- Population (2021): 1,641
- Time zone: UTC+3 (TRT)

Güzelyalı is a seaside village in the Çanakkale District of Çanakkale Province of western Turkey. Its population is 1,641 (2021). It is 15 km from the Çanakkale city centre. Güzelyalı is surrounded by pine woods in the east and by the Çanakkale Strait (the Dardanelles) in the west.

Distances from Güzelyalı: Bozcaada (island) 40 km, Assos/Behramkale 50 km, Gelibolu (Gallipoli) 30 km, Truva (Troy) 10 km, Istanbul Atatürk Airport 300 km.

The population of the town is about 500 in winter, and about 5,000 in the spring and summer seasons. It has a post office, mosque, parking area, restaurants, three big markets and a few small shops.
