= Salihler, Güdül =

Salihler
- Neighbourhood
- Location in Turkey Salihler (Turkey Central Anatolia)
- Coordinates: 40.1485°N 32.1859°E
- Country: Turkey
- Province: Ankara
- District: Güdül
- Population (2022): 241
- Time zone: UTC+3 (TRT)

Salihler is a neighbourhood in the municipality and district of Güdül, Ankara Province, Turkey. Its population is 241 (2022).
