= Karacaören, Güdül =

Karacaören
- Neighbourhood
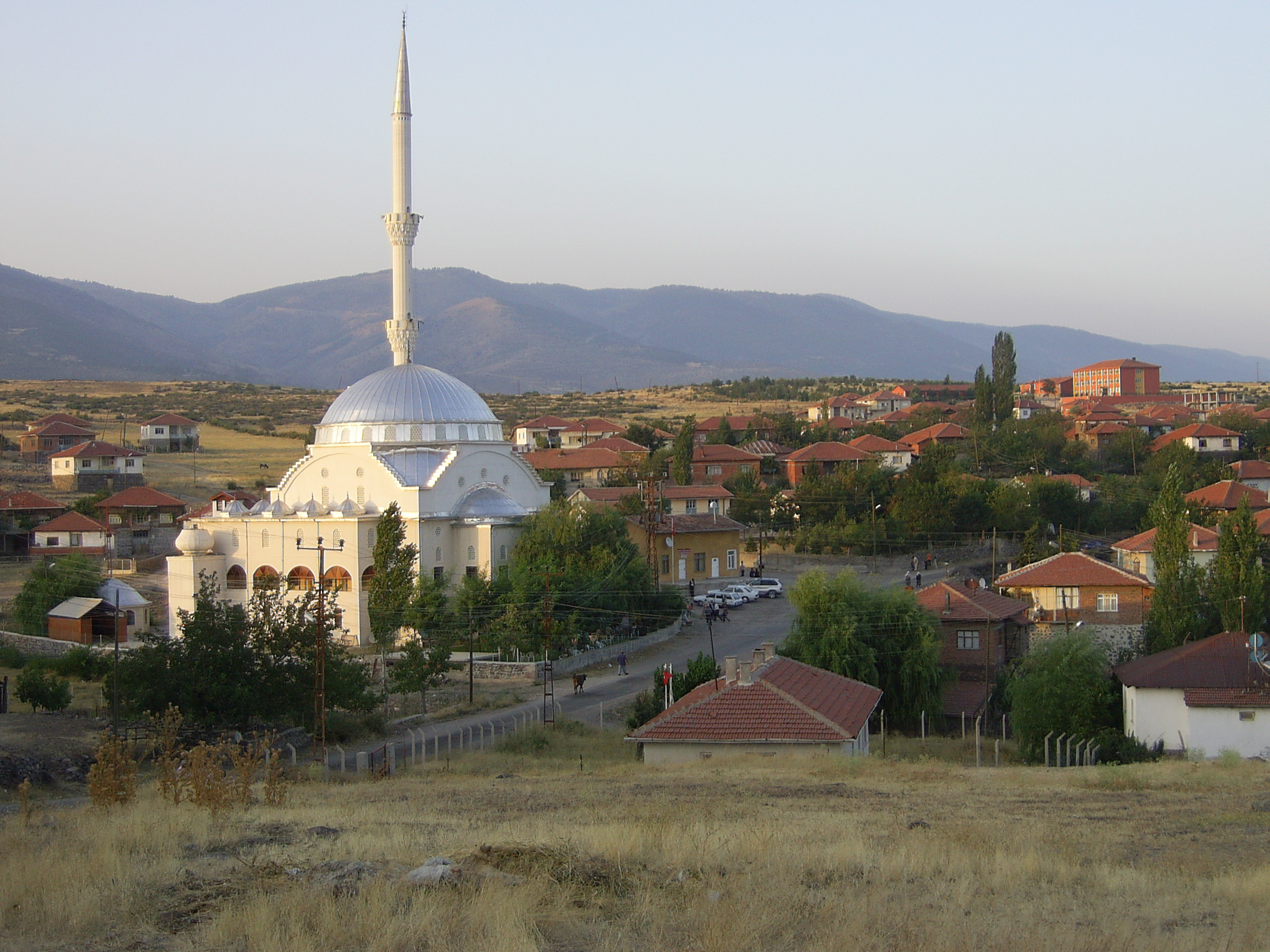

- Location within Turkey Location within Turkey Central Anatolia
- Coordinates: 40.2462°N 32.2324°E
- Country: Turkey
- Province: Ankara
- District: Güdül
- Population (2022): 421
- Time zone: UTC+3 (TRT)

Karacaören is a neighbourhood in the municipality and district of Güdül, Ankara Province, Turkey. Its population is 421 (2022).
