= Çamyayla, Çanakkale =

Village in Turkey

Çamyayla
- Village
- Location in Turkey Çamyayla (Marmara)
- Coordinates: 40.1088°N 26.7266°E
- Country: Turkey
- Province: Çanakkale
- District: Çanakkale
- Population (2021): 56
- Time zone: UTC+3 (TRT)

Çamyayla is a village in the Çanakkale District of Çanakkale Province in Turkey. Its population is 56 (2021).
