= Salihler, Çanakkale =

Village in Turkey

Salihler
- Village
- Country: Turkey
- Province: Çanakkale
- District: Çanakkale
- Population (2021): 108
- Time zone: UTC+3 (TRT)

Salihler is a village in the Çanakkale District of Çanakkale Province in Turkey. Its population is 108 (2021).
