= Yapıldak, Çanakkale =

Village in Turkey

Yapıldak
- Village
- Location in Turkey Yapıldak (Marmara)
- Coordinates: 40°12′28″N 26°32′57″E
- Country: Turkey
- Province: Çanakkale
- District: Çanakkale
- Population (2021): 459
- Time zone: UTC+3 (TRT)

Yapıldak is a village in the Çanakkale District of Çanakkale Province in Turkey. Its population is 459 (2021).
