= Karacaören-1 Dam =

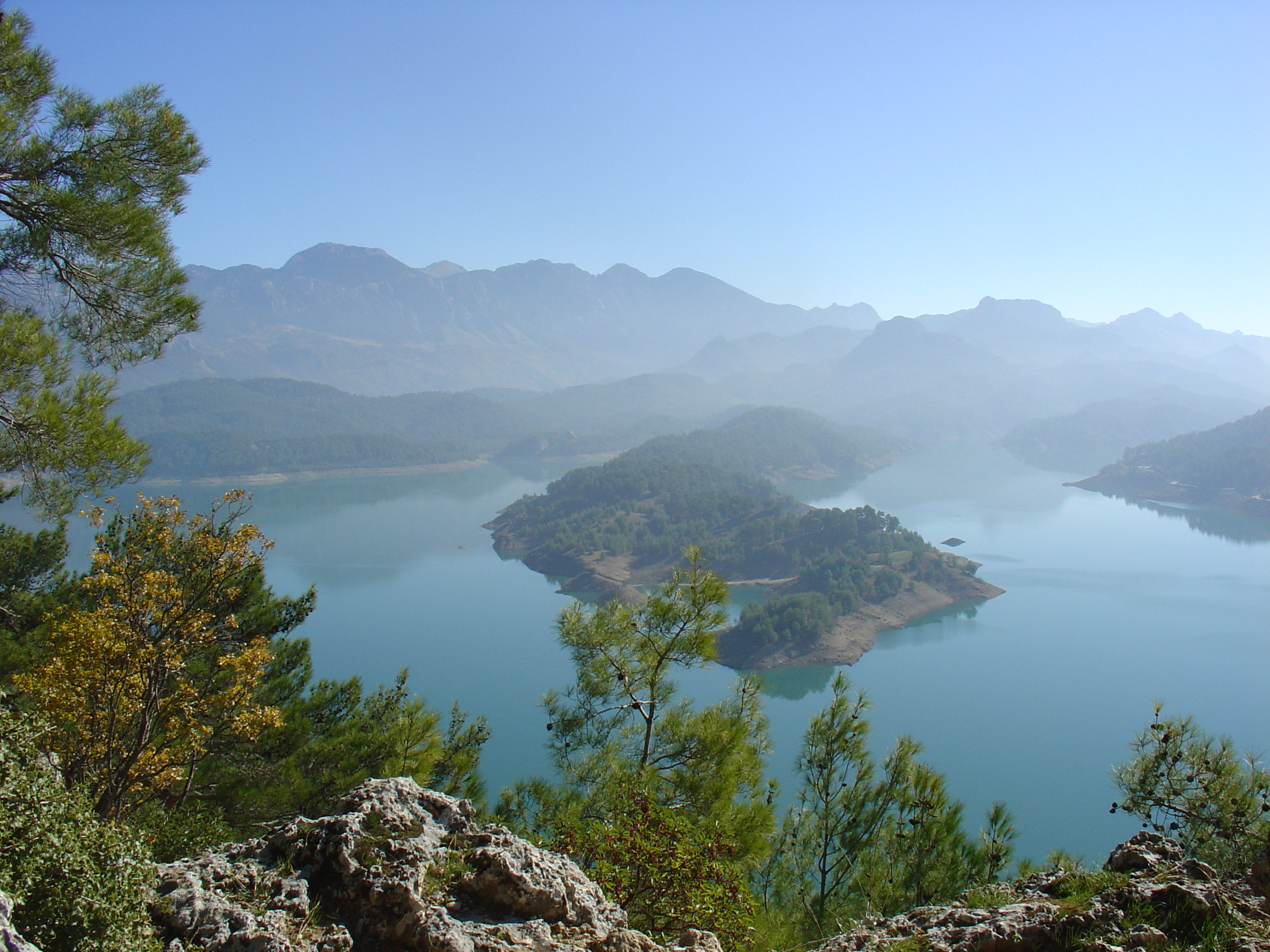
- Location: Turkey
- Coordinates: 37.3699°N 30.8292°E

Power Station
- Installed capacity: 32 MW
- Annual generation: 142 GWh

Karacaören-1 Dam is a dam in Burdur, Turkey on the Aksu river. According to the State Hydraulic Works, it was built between 1977 and 1990, irrigates 9537 hectares of land, and generates 142 GWh of power annually.

== See also ==
- List of dams and reservoirs in Turkey
