= Halileli, Çanakkale =

Village in Turkey

Halileli
- Village
- Location in Turkey Halileli (Marmara)
- Coordinates: 39°58′N 26°17′E
- Country: Turkey
- Province: Çanakkale
- District: Çanakkale
- Population (2021): 401
- Time zone: UTC+3 (TRT)

Halileli is a village in the Çanakkale District of Çanakkale Province in Turkey. Its population is 401 (2021).
