= Tevfikiye, Çanakkale =

Village in Turkey

Tevfikiye
- Village
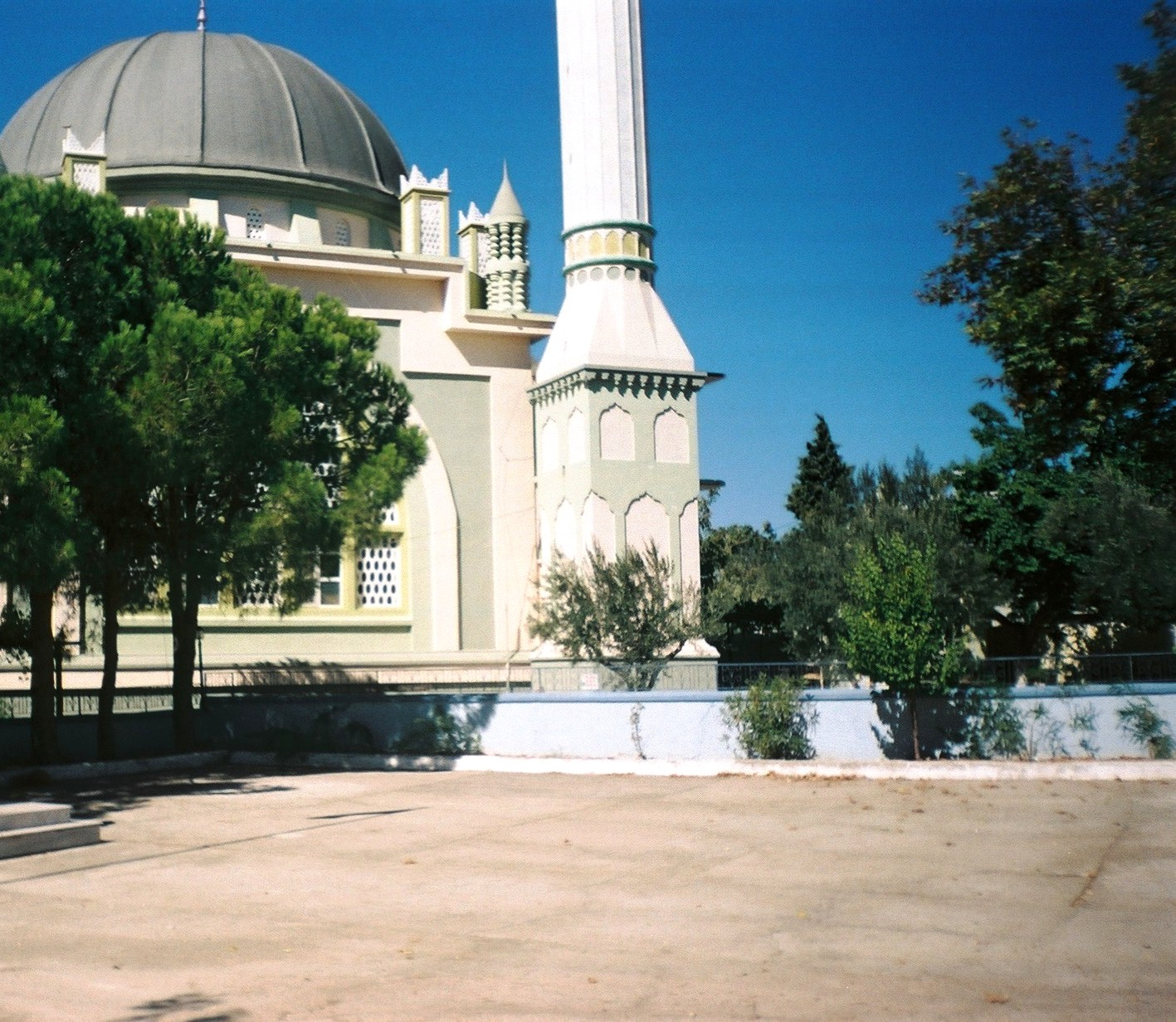

- Location within Turkey Location within Marmara
- Coordinates: 39°57′35″N 26°15′10″E
- Country: Turkey
- Province: Çanakkale
- District: Çanakkale
- Population (2021): 425
- Time zone: UTC+3 (TRT)

Tevfikiye is a village in the Çanakkale District of Çanakkale Province in Turkey. Its population is 425 (2021). It lies next to the archaeological site of Troy. Tevfikiye was captured by the Greek Army in June 1920 and later recaptured by the Turkish Army in September 1922.
