= Ortaca, Çanakkale =

Village in Turkey

Ortaca
- Village
- Country: Turkey
- Province: Çanakkale
- District: Çanakkale
- Population (2021): 67
- Time zone: UTC+3 (TRT)

Ortaca is a village in the Çanakkale District of Çanakkale Province in Turkey. Its population is 67 (2021).
