= Akçeşme, Çanakkale =

Village in Turkey

Akçeşme
- Village
- Location in Turkey Akçeşme (Marmara)
- Coordinates: 39.9223°N 26.3287°E
- Country: Turkey
- Province: Çanakkale
- District: Çanakkale
- Population (2021): 153
- Time zone: UTC+3 (TRT)

Akçeşme is a village in the Çanakkale District of Çanakkale Province in Turkey. Its population is 153 (2021).
