= Karacaören, Çanakkale =

Village in Turkey

Karacaören
- Village
- Country: Turkey
- Province: Çanakkale
- District: Çanakkale
- Population (2021): 905
- Time zone: UTC+3 (TRT)

Karacaören is a village in the Çanakkale District of Çanakkale Province in Turkey. Its population is 905 (2021).
