= Gökçalı, Çanakkale =

Village in Turkey

Gökçalı
- Village
- Location in Turkey Gökçalı (Marmara)
- Coordinates: 39°57′N 26°18′E
- Country: Turkey
- Province: Çanakkale
- District: Çanakkale
- Population (2021): 416
- Time zone: UTC+3 (TRT)

Gökçalı is a village in the Çanakkale District of Çanakkale Province in Turkey. Its population is 416 (2021).
