= Kalafat, Çanakkale =

Village in Turkey

Kalafat
- Village
- Location in Turkey Kalafat (Marmara)
- Coordinates: 39.946°N 26.234°E
- Country: Turkey
- Province: Çanakkale
- District: Çanakkale
- Population (2021): 187
- Time zone: UTC+3 (TRT)

Kalafat is a village in the Çanakkale District of Çanakkale Province in Turkey. Its population is 187 (2021).
