= Astyra (Troad) =

Town of ancient Troad

Coordinates: 40°02′35″N 26°40′58″E

Astyra (Ancient Greek: Ἄστυρα) was a town of ancient Troad, mentioned by Strabo. Strabo writes that it was above Abydus and once an independent city, but in Strabo's time it was a ruined place, and belonged to the inhabitants of Abydus. There were once gold mines there, but they were nearly exhausted in Strabo's time.

Its site is located 2 miles (3.2 km) southwest of Haliloğlu, Çanakkale Province, Turkey.
