= Haliloğlu, Çanakkale =

Village in Turkey

Haliloğlu
- Village
- Location within Turkey Location within Marmara
- Country: Turkey
- Province: Çanakkale
- District: Çanakkale
- Population (2021): 38
- Time zone: UTC+3 (TRT)

Haliloğlu is a village in the Çanakkale District of Çanakkale Province in Turkey. Its population is 38 (2021).
