= Köseler =

Köseler (literally "those that are beardless" in Turkish) may refer to the following places in Turkey:

- Köseler, Artvin, a village in the district of Artvin, Artvin Province
- Köseler, Bayramiç
- Köseler, Beypazarı, a village in the district of Beypazarı, Ankara Province
- Köseler, Bigadiç, a village
- Köseler, Çat
- Köseler, Ezine
- Köseler, Gümüşhacıköy, a village in the district of Gümüşhacıköy, Amasya Province
- Köseler, Kahta, a village in the district of Kahta, Adıyaman Province
- Köseler, Korkuteli, a village in the district of Korkuteli, Antalya Province
- Köseler, Kıbrısçık, a village in the district of Kıbrısçık, Bolu Province
- Köseler, Yığılca
