= Çukurçayır (disambiguation) =

Çukurçayır can refer to:

- Çukurçayır
- Çukurçayır, Çat
- Çukurçayır, Savaştepe
