= Yoğunpelit =

Yoğunpelit can refer to:

- Yoğunpelit, Beypazarı
- Yoğunpelit, Yığılca
