= Kurbanlı =

Kurbanlı can refer to:

- Kurbanlı, Çat
- Kurbanlı, Tarsus
