= Soğukpınar =

Soğukpınar can refer to the following villages in Turkey:

- Soğukpınar, Alanya
- Soğukpınar, Çat
- Soğukpınar, Ceyhan
- Soğukpınar, Düzce
- Soğukpınar, Giresun
- Soğukpınar, İnebolu
- Soğukpınar, Kovancılar
- Soğukpınar, Sivrice
