= Kabaca =

Kabaca may refer to:

== People ==
- Sadık Emir Kabaca (born 2000), Turkish basketball player
- Turgut Kabaca (born 1972), Turkish water polo player

== Places ==
- Kabaca, Beypazarı, a neighbourhood in Ankara Province, Turkey
- Kabaca, Devrek, a village in Zonguldak Province, Turkey
- Kabaca, Murgul, a village in Artvin Province, Turkey
- Kabaca, Nallıhan, a neighbourhood in Ankara Province, Turkey
- Kabaca, Sultanhisar, a neighbourhood in Aydın Province, Turkey
