= Haydarlar =

Haydarlar may refer to the following settlements in Turkey:

- Haydarlar, Beypazarı, a neighbourhood in Ankara Province
- Haydarlar, Hassa, a village in Hatay Province
- Haydarlar, Kastamonu, a village in Kastamonu Province
- Haydarlar, Musabeyli, a village in Kilis Province
