= Gölköy (disambiguation) =

Gölköy can refer to:

- Gölköy
- Gölköy, Çat
- Gölköy, Elâzığ
- Gölköy, İskilip
- Gölköy, Kargı
- Gölköy, Refahiye
