= Taşağıl =

Taşağıl may refer to:

- Taşağıl, Aşkale
- Taşağıl, Ayvacık
- Taşağıl, Bolvadin
- Taşağıl, Çat
- Taşağıl, Manavgat
- Taşağıl, Pasinler
