= Adaören =

Adaören can refer to the following villages in Turkey:

- Adaören, Beypazarı
- Adaören, Dursunbey
