= Theodore of Sykeon =

Anatolian saint (6/7th century)

Saint Theodore of Sykeon
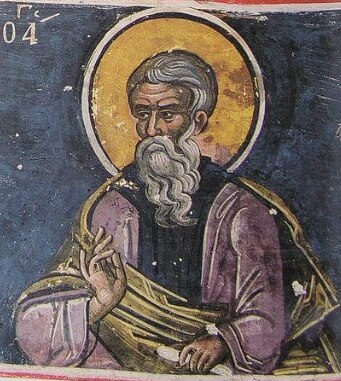

Bishop of Anastasioupolis
- Born: first half of the 6th century Sykeon (near modern Kayabükü, Beypazarı)
- Died: 613; Orsan Priory, Cher
- Venerated in: Eastern Orthodox Church; Catholic Church
- Major shrine: Monastery of St. George of Mangana, Constantinople (destroyed)
- Feast: 22 April

Saint Theodore of Sykeon, also known as Theodore the Sykeote (Greek: Θεόδωρος ό Συκεώτης), was a revered Byzantine ascetic, who lived between the first half of the 6th century and the thirteenth year of the Emperor Heraclius' rule (i. e. 623) in the early 7th century (or on 22 April 613). His hagiography, written after 641, is a key primary source for the reign of Emperor Heraclius (r. 610–641). His feast day is 22 April.

== Life ==
=== Early life ===
Theodore was born in Sykeon, a village in Galatia. The public highway of the imperial post ran through this village, and on the road stood an inn kept by a very beautiful girl, Mary, her mother, Elpidia, and a sister Despoinia. These women lived in the inn and followed the profession of courtesans. Theodore was the son of Mary and Cosmas, who had become popular in the hippodrome of Constantinople in the corps of those who performed acrobatic feats on camels and was appointed to carry out the emperor's orders. The biography of St Theodore depicts the women in his household as strong who have some choices in their life and are able to make a living through the proceeds from the inn.

When Theodore was about twelve years old an epidemic of bubonic plague fell upon the village and it attacked him along with others so that he came near to dying. They took him to the shrine of St. John the Baptist near the village and laid him at the entrance to the sanctuary; he recovered and returned home.

He used to frequent a shrine dedicated to the martyr St. George, located up the rocky hill which lay near the village. At the age of fourteen, he went there to live. Even at such a young age, Theodore was granted the gift of healing.

Theodore then withdrew into complete solitude, to a cave not far from the oratory of St George. He persuaded a deacon to bring him bread and water, and he told no one else where he had hidden himself. For two years St Theodore lived in this seclusion until news of the youth’s exploits reached the local bishop Theodosius, who ordained him to the diaconate, and later to the holy priesthood, although the saint was only eighteen years old at the time.

Theodore then resolved to go to Jerusalem and other places in the Holy Land, also visiting the desert monasteries and anchorites living in the desert. At the monastery of Choziba he received from the abbot the monastic habit, but he returned to Galatia.

=== Bishop ===
He was chosen Bishop of Anastasioupolis. On his third journey to the Holy Land, Theodore was seized by the desire to lay down the office of bishop and stayed for some time at the Laura of Saba which at this time attracted men throughout the Christian world who sought the perfect monastic life. Only after St George appeared to him in a dream did Theodore return to his bishopric in Anastasioupolis.

During the reign of Emperor Maurice (r. 582–602), he foretold the emperor's death and "great tribulations, terrible scourges [that] threaten the world." He was soon proven correct with the outbreak of the 26-year-long Persian war sparked by the death of Maurice. He was a close friend of the family of Emperor Phocas. Despite that, he spoke of

The trembling of the cross forecasts a crowd of misfortunes and perils for us. Yes, it forecasts fluctuations in our faith, and apostasies, invasions of many barbarian peoples, floods of blood scattered, ruin and captivity for everyone, the desolation of the holy churches, the halting of the divine service, the fall and upsetting of the Empire, embarrassments without number and serious times for the state. In short, it announces that the coming of the Enemy [devil] is soon.

— St. Theodore of Sykeon

Furthermore, he would only pray for Phocas if the latter stopped massacring people. Still, after the successful rebellion of Emperor Heraclius, he intervened to save the life of Domentziolus, the nephew of Phocas. In return, St. Theodore of Sykeon was asked to "pray for [Heraclius] and his reign."

St. Theodore of Sykeon had good relations with Patriarch Sergius of Constantinople. Still, historian Walter Kaegi says that Heraclius "may always have felt some reserve in his relations with" St. Theodore. During Lent 613, Heraclius asked for St. Theodore's blessing in fighting the Sassanids. St. Theodore blessed him and invited him to dinner, but Heraclius refused because of time concerns. However, the saint claimed that not accepting his gifts was a "sign of our defeat". Indeed, Heraclius lost the Battle of Antioch.

He died on 22 April 613.

== Sources ==
The primary source for Theodore's life is the Life of Theodore, written in the early 640s by his disciple George who draw on information from Theodore's schoolfellows and contemporaries. The vita is comparatively rich in circumstantial detail and depicts interactions of St Theodore with every social class, from slaves to emperors. It is therefore an important source for contemporary events, the life of women, family life and the fluid network of monasteries and holy men's cells that existed in Asia Minor.

== Veneration ==
His remains were quickly brought to Constantinople to protect them from the Persian war and to add divine protection to the city. An elaborate ceremony of the reception of the remains associated St. Theodore with Heraclius's regime.
