= Elmapınar =

Elmapınar may refer to:

- Elmapınar, Çat
- Elmapınar, Kalecik
- Elmapınar, Mecitözü
- Elmapınar, Mut
