= Beypazarı =

- District and municipality
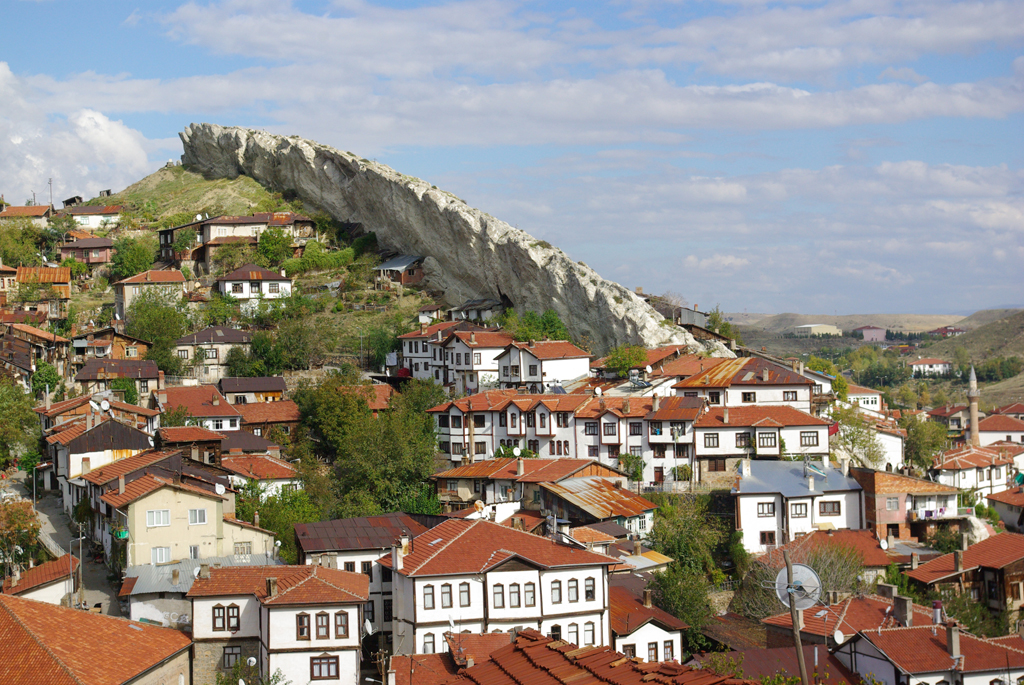

- Logo

- Map showing Beypazarı District in Ankara Province

- Location within Turkey Location within Turkey Central Anatolia
- Coordinates: 40°10′13″N 31°55′16″E
- Country: Turkey
- Province: Ankara

Government
  - Mayor: Özer Kasap (CHP)
- Area: 1,697 km^{2} (655 sq mi)
- Elevation: 675 m (2,215 ft)
- Population (2022): 48,357
  - Density: 28.50/km^{2} (73.80/sq mi)
- Time zone: UTC+3 (TRT)
- Postal code: 06730
- Area code: 0312
- Website: www.beypazari.bel.tr

Beypazarı is a municipality and district of Ankara Province, Turkey. Its area is 1,697 km^{2}, and its population is 48,357 (2022). It is approximately 100 km northwest of the city of Ankara. The elevation in the center is 675 m (2,215 ft). It used to be an important city in Asia Minor in ancient times.

== Etymology ==
The name Beypazarı means The Bey's market in Turkish, as in the Ottoman period this was an important military base and the cavalry stationed here were an important element of the local economy.

== History ==
The area has a long history of occupation by Hittites, Phrygians, Greeks, Romans, Byzantines, Seljuk Turks and the Ottoman Empire. Beypazarı was known as Lagania (Λαγάνια), meaning 'rocky peak' or alternatively 'cooking pot' in the Ancient Greek language during the Ancient and Byzantine times, and the town was a regional administrative center.

Like most Luwian cities located in West Anatolia, Lagania supported the Trojans during the famous Trojan war.The area was conquered by Alexander the Great in 333 BC. It was followingly occupied Galatians namely the Tectosages . The gallic region was later (189 BC) subjected by the Romans. It became a Roman province in 25 BC, and was split into two provinces, Galatia Prima and Galatia Secunda.

The town gained importance in Christian times when it was also an episcopal see, suffragan of the Metropolis of Ancyra (modern Ankara), mentioned by the Notitiae Episcopatuum when it took the name Anastasiopolis (Ἀναστασιοῡπολις) during the reign of Emperor Anastasius I (r. 491–518) after he visited the city which he liked very much. One of its most known bishops was Theodore of Sykeon, later declared saint. No longer a residential bishopric, Lagania remains a titular see of the Roman Catholic Church.

The town was conquered by the Seljuk Turks in the 12th century and was settled by various lords of the Oghuz Turks, eventually becoming part of the Ottoman Empire. Gazi Gündüzalp, the grandfather of Osman I, the founder of the Ottoman Empire, is buried in the village of Hırkatepe in the district.

== Beypazarı today ==
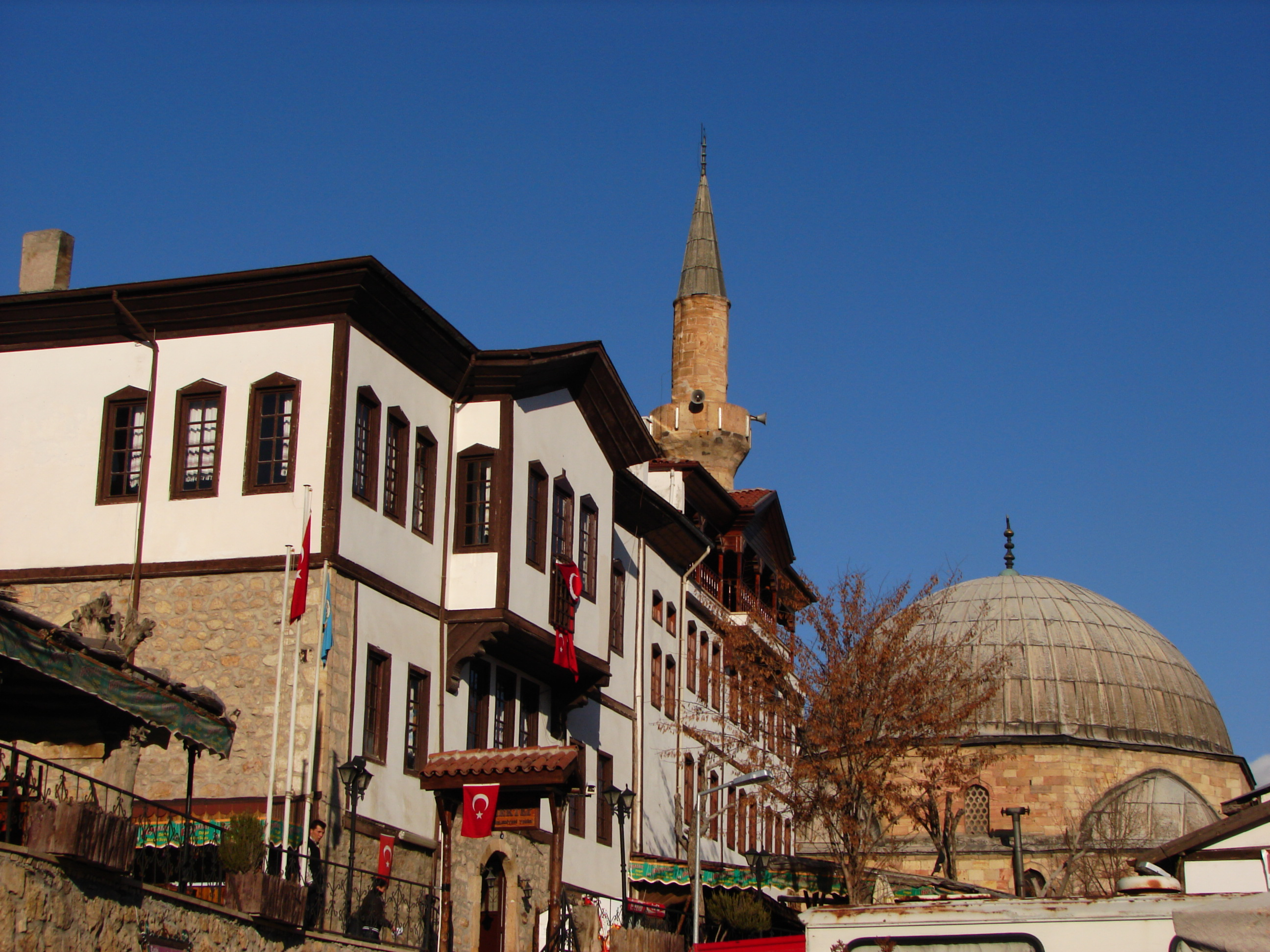
Taşmektep in Beypazarı, Ankara

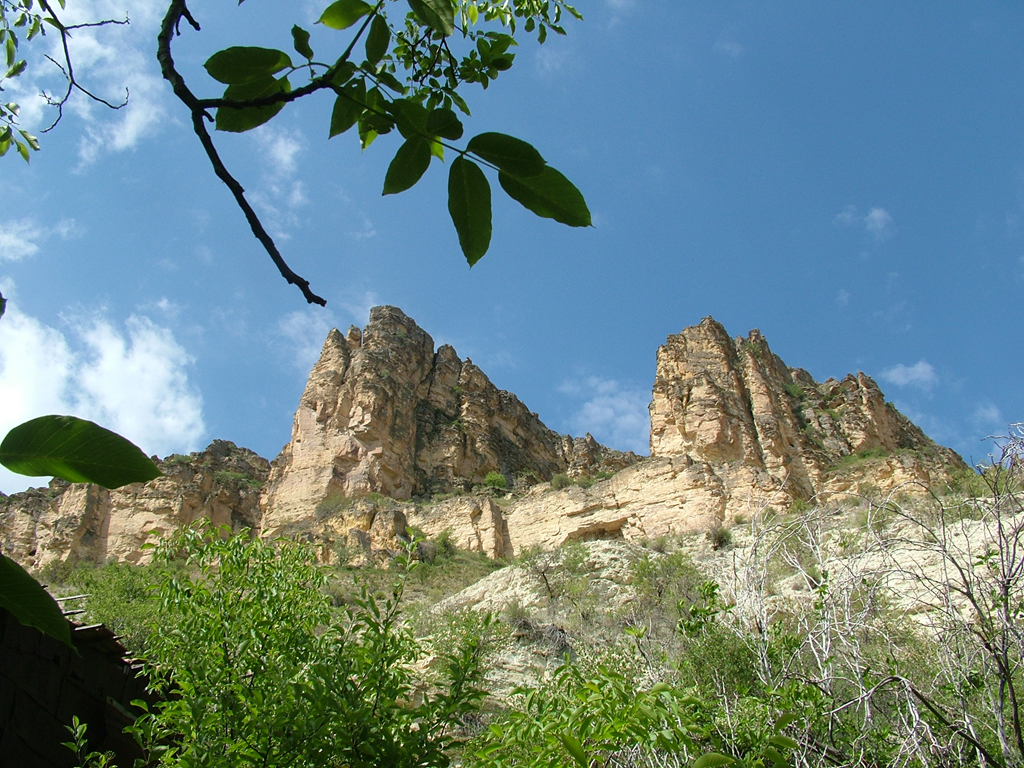
Beypazarı Valley

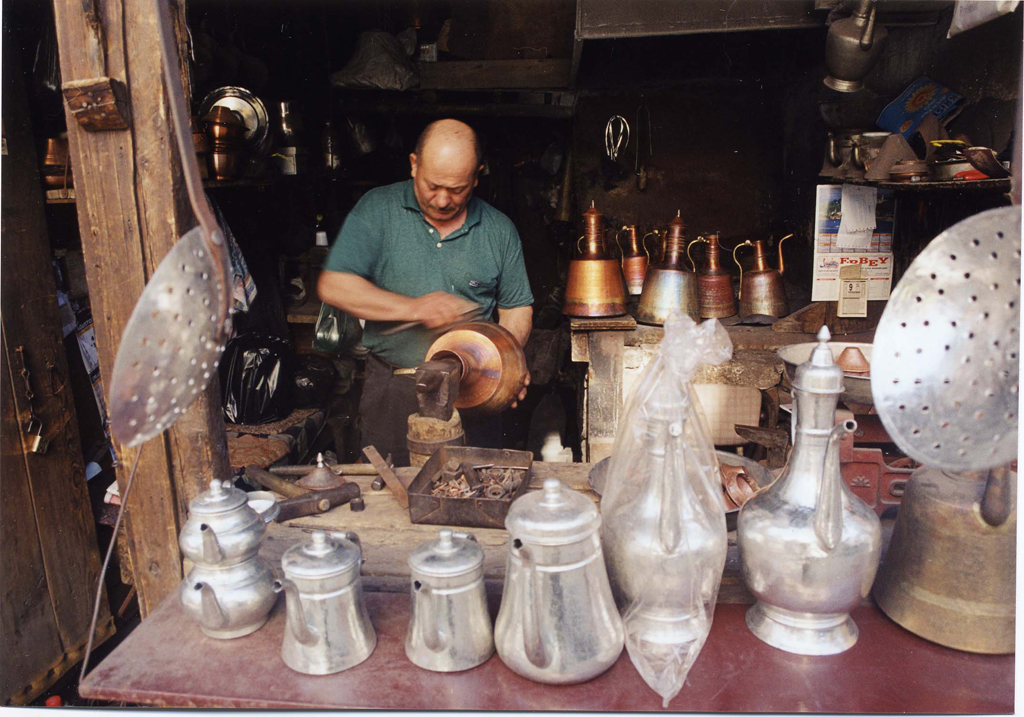
Traditional Turkish handicrafts continue to be used in Beypazarı.

Beypazarı today is a small town in a rural district famous for its carrots, silverwork (Telkari), and a high quality natural mineral water. The crystal mineral trona, a kind of natural soda used in glass-making is extracted in Beypazarı. With its rich history, architectural heritage and attractive rocky countryside, Beypazarı is becoming increasingly attractive to visitors, especially between day-trippers from Ankara. The cobbled streets of white Ottoman period buildings are particularly very attractive; many of the old houses have been restored as hotels and restaurants (and are also popular with Turkish film directors looking for authentic locations). Every June the town holds its popular Traditional Historical Houses, Handicrafts, Carrot and stew Festival. The visitors are generating a valuable income to the town's economy by purchasing silverwares and providing good business to the local food markets and restaurants.

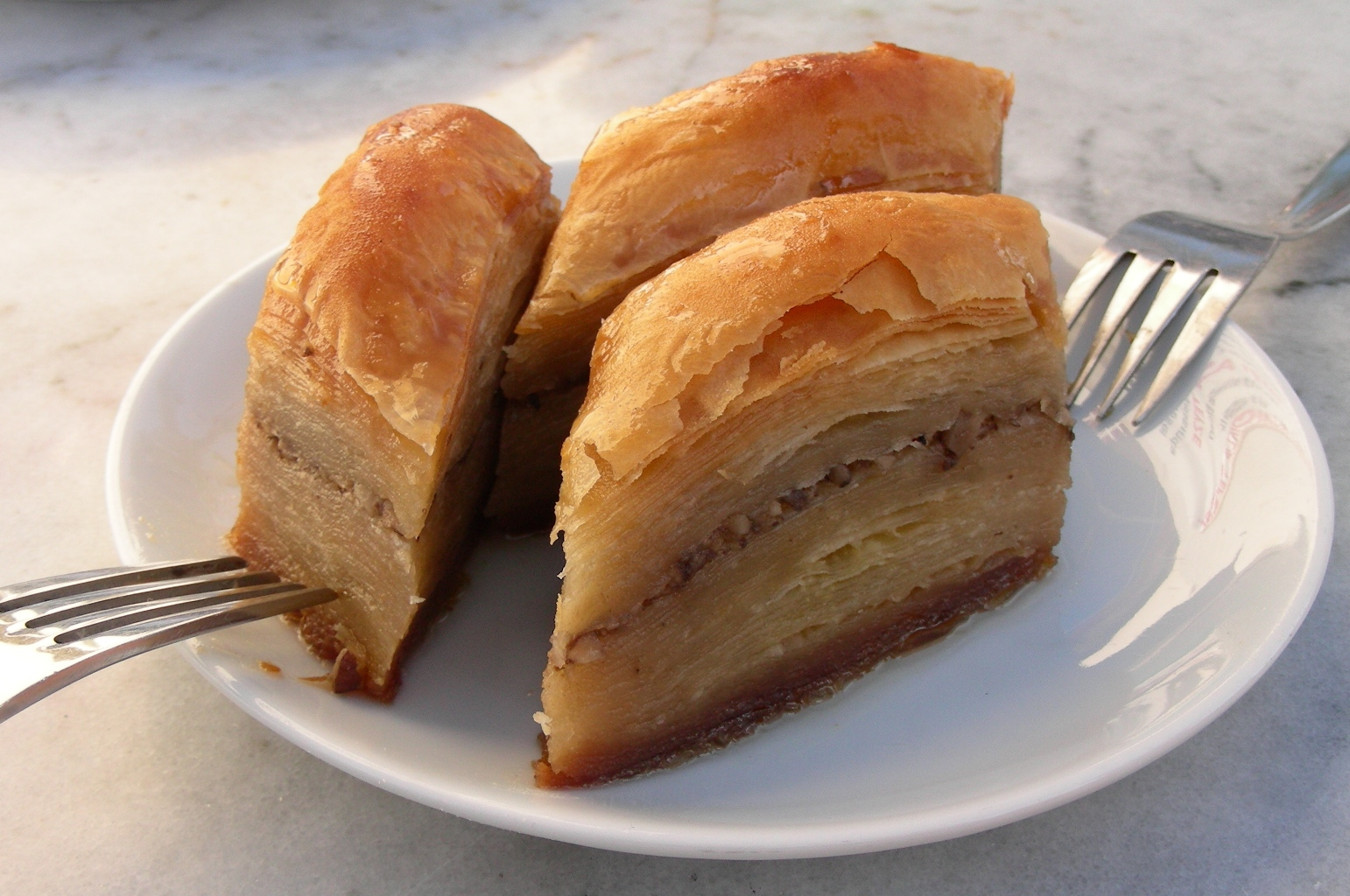
80-layer baklava (which is usually 40- layer), a speciality of Beypazarı.

Local cuisine offers traditional Turkish dishes such as the yoghurt drink ayran, cracked wheat (or flour), yoghurt, and vegetables fermented then dried and mixed with water to make a thick soup tarhana, stuffed vine leaves, sausage mumbar, and a stew cooked in a stone-oven called güveç. Sweets include the sweet cream pudding called höşmerim and pastries including a dry buttery biscuit called Beypazarı kurusu, and a renowned 80-layer baklava. They also use carrots in many dishes; with their carrots, drinking carrot juice and producing carrot-flavoured Turkish Delight and carrot ice-cream. Beypazarı is surrounded by farmland and the locally grown ingredients are a large part of why Beypazarı's cooking is popular with visitors. A gift many take back home is the sticky sausage-shaped sweet made from dried molasses-like grape syrup stuffed with walnut cevizli sucuk.

The town is unusual in Turkey, for celebrating a religious festival (Regaip Kandili, the conception of the prophet Muhammad) with lights and fireworks.

Beypazarı is a member of the European Association of Historic Towns and Regions (EAHTR).

Mayor of Ankara Mansur Yavaş was born in the district and he was the mayor of Beypazarı between 1999 and 2009.

== Composition ==
There are 78 neighbourhoods in Beypazarı District:

- Acısu
- Adaören
- Akçakavak
- Akçalı
- Aşağıgüney
- Ayvaşık
- Bağözü
- Başağaç
- Başören
- Batça
- Beytepe
- Boyalı
- Çakıloba
- Çantırlı
- Cumhuriyet
- Dağşeyhler
- Dereli
- Dibecik
- Dibekören
- Dikmen
- Doğançalı
- Doğanyurt
- Dudaş
- Fasıl
- Gazipaşa
- Geyikpınarı
- Gürsöğüt
- Hacıkara
- Harmancık
- Haydarlar
- Hırkatepe
- İncepelit
- İstiklal
- Kabaca
- Kabalar
- Kaplan
- Kapullu
- Karacaören
- Karaören
- Karaşar
- Kargı
- Kayabükü
- Kerbanlar
- Kırbaşı
- Kırşeyhler
- Kızılcasöğüt
- Köseler
- Köst
- Kozağaç
- Kozalan
- Kurtkovan
- Kurtuluş
- Kuyucak
- Kuyumcutekke
- Macun
- Mahmutlar
- Mençeler
- Mikail
- Nuhhoca
- Oymaağaç
- Rüstempaşa
- Saray
- Sarıağıl
- Sekli
- Sopçaalan
- Tacettin
- Tahir
- Üreğil
- Uruş
- Uşakgöl
- Yalnızçam
- Yeşilağaç
- Yiğerler
- Yıldız
- Yoğunpelit
- Yukarıgüney
- Yukarıulucak
- Zafer

== Climate ==
Beypazarı has a cold semi-arid climate (Köppen: BSk), with hot, dry summers, and chilly, damp, often snowy winters.

Climate data for Beypazarı (1991–2020)
Month	Jan	Feb	Mar	Apr	May	Jun	Jul	Aug	Sep	Oct	Nov	Dec	Year
Mean daily maximum °C (°F)	5.1 (41.2)	8.3 (46.9)	13.6 (56.5)	19.2 (66.6)	25.0 (77.0)	29.7 (85.5)	33.5 (92.3)	33.5 (92.3)	28.5 (83.3)	21.4 (70.5)	13.4 (56.1)	6.9 (44.4)	19.9 (67.8)
Daily mean °C (°F)	1.3 (34.3)	3.4 (38.1)	7.5 (45.5)	12.5 (54.5)	17.6 (63.7)	21.7 (71.1)	25.3 (77.5)	25.3 (77.5)	20.7 (69.3)	14.7 (58.5)	7.8 (46.0)	3.1 (37.6)	13.5 (56.3)
Mean daily minimum °C (°F)	−1.6 (29.1)	−0.6 (30.9)	2.3 (36.1)	6.5 (43.7)	11.1 (52.0)	14.7 (58.5)	17.6 (63.7)	17.7 (63.9)	13.5 (56.3)	9.0 (48.2)	3.4 (38.1)	0.1 (32.2)	7.8 (46.0)
Average precipitation mm (inches)	46.48 (1.83)	38.27 (1.51)	41.83 (1.65)	44.1 (1.74)	39.61 (1.56)	37.22 (1.47)	10.78 (0.42)	11.89 (0.47)	16.1 (0.63)	33.81 (1.33)	29.79 (1.17)	48.48 (1.91)	398.36 (15.68)
Average precipitation days (≥ 1.0 mm)	7.9	6.5	6.7	6.3	6.7	6.2	2.4	2.5	3.7	5.0	5.1	7.5	66.5
Average relative humidity (%)	79.0	71.3	63.0	57.7	55.5	52.1	45.3	45.5	48.7	60.2	69.4	78.8	60.6
Source: NOAA

== Places of interest ==
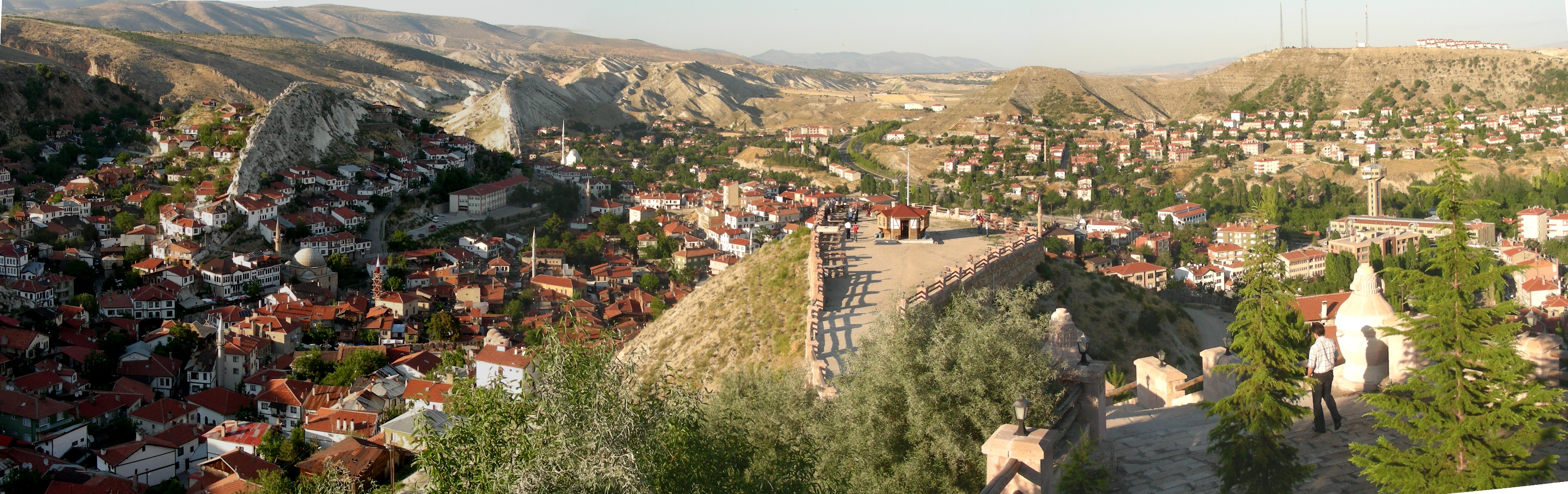
Beypazarı as viewed from the top of Hıdırlık Hill.

- Hıdırlık Tepesi, a hilltop view of the town
- Ottoman period buildings include the 17th-century Suluhan Caravanserai and the 13th-century Sultan Alaedin Mosque
- The Kültür Evi museum, displaying items from Hittite, Roman, Byzantine, and Ottoman times
- Inözü Valley, a steep-walled canyon, giving access to the caves, tombs, and churches carved into the rock
