= Hacı Karay =

Kurdish human rights activist in Turkey

- Born: 1950; Yüksekova, Turkey
- Died: June 1994 (aged 43–44); Yukarıkaraş, Turkey
- Body discovered: 4 June 1994
- Occupation: Businessman
- Known for: Being kidnapped and subsequently murdered

Hacı Karay (1950 – June 1994) was a Turkish human rights activist of Kurdish descent.

He was born in Yüksekova, Hakkari, to Fehim Karay (father).

On 13 February 1993, he participated in the action of closing shops in Yüksekova in support of the hunger strikes staged at Diyarbakır Prison.

He had connections to Savaş Buldan. Along with fellow businessmen Savaş Buldan and Adnan Yıldırım, he was abducted by armed persons from Çınar Hotel in Yeşilyurt, Istanbul, on 3 June 1994. The abducted persons were found dead on 4 June 1994 on the road of Yukarıkaraş village of Yığılca district in Bolu. They were buried at Avcılar cemetery, Istanbul.

In March 1995, his sisters Gülcan and Gülsen Karay traveled to a rural area in Şemdinli, southeastern Turkey to join the PKK.

== See also ==
- List of kidnappings
- List of unsolved murders
