= Budaklar =

Budaklar can refer to:

- Budaklar, Ayvacık
- Budaklar, Çat
