= Sarika (disambiguation) =

Sarika (born 1960) is an Indian actress.

Sarika may also refer to:

- Sarika, a genus of snails in the family Ariophantidae
- Sarika Sadan, a writer's house museum in Surat, Gujarat, India
- Typhoon Sarika (disambiguation)
- Sarika, Hindi literary magazine published by the Times Group, from 1960-1985.
- Sarika Khanna, character in the 2012 Indian film B. A. Pass, played by Shilpa Shukla

== People with the given name ==
- Sarika Cullis-Suzuki, marine biologist and co-host of The Nature of Things since 2024, daughter of David Suzuki
- Sarika Devendra Singh Baghel (born 1980), Indian politician
- Sarika Koli (born 1994), Indian cricketer
- Sarika Prasad (born 1959), Singaporean international cricket umpire
- Sarika Sabrin, Bangladeshi actress and model
- Sarika Singh (disambiguation)
- Sarika Yehoshua (born 1927), former Greek-Israeli resistance member

== See also ==
- Sarıkaya (disambiguation)
- Śālikanātha, ancient Indian philosopher
