= Bağözü =

Bağözü can refer to:

- Bağözü, Beypazarı
- Bağözü, Gercüş
- Bağözü, Kargı
- Bağözü, Kozan
