= Macun (disambiguation) =

Macun is a Turkish toffee paste.

Macun may also refer to:

- Macun, Beypazarı, a neighbourhood in Ankara Province, Turkey
- Macun, Elmalı, a neighbourhood in Antalya Province, Turkey
- Macun, Polatlı, a neighbourhood in Ankara Province, Turkey
- Macun, Shandong, a town in Jining, China
- Macun District, a district of Henan, China
- Macun Port, a seaport in Hainan, China
- Macun Township, Hebei, a division in Shijiazhuang, China
