= Adnan Yıldırım =

Turkish abductee

- Born: 1957; Diyarbakır, Turkey
- Died: 2 June 1994 (aged 36–37); Yukarıkaraş, Turkey
- Body discovered: 4 June 1994
- Occupation: Businessman
- Known for: Being the victim of a kidnapping and subsequent murder
- Parent: Selim Yıldırım

Adnan Yıldırım (1957 – 2 June 1994) was a Turkish businessman of Kurdish descent.

Yıldırım was born in Diyarbakır, the son of Selim Yıldırım.

On 3 June 1994 together with Savaş Buldan and Hacı Karay, he was abducted by unidentified armed persons from the Çınar Hotel in Yeşilyurt, Istanbul. The abducted persons were found dead on 4 June 1994, on the road of Yukarıkaraş village of Yığılca District, Bolu Province. They were buried at Avcılar cemetery, Istanbul.

== See also ==
- List of kidnappings
