= Parmaksız =

Parmaksız can refer to:

- Parmaksız, Çat
- Parmaksız, Hınıs
