= Mengen =

Mengen may refer to:

- Mengen, Bolu, a town and district in Bolu province, Turkey
- Mengen, Germany, a town in Baden-Württemberg
- Mengen, Yığılca
- Mengen language, a language of Papua New Guinea
