= Karabey =

Karabey can refer to:

- Karabey, Çat
- Karabey, Karayazı
- Karabey, Yavuzeli
