= Hatunköy =

Hatunköy can refer to:

- Hatunköy, Çat
- Hatunköy, Maden
