= Acısu =

Acısu can refer to:

- Acısu, Beypazarı
- Acısu, Sarayköy
