= Buldan (disambiguation) =

Buldan may refer to:

== People ==
- Pervin Buldan, Kurdish politician
- Savaş Buldan, Kurdish businessman

== Places ==
- Buldan, town and a district of Denizli Province
- Buldan Dam, dam in Denizli Province
