= Sarıkaya =

Sarıkaya is a Turkish word meaning "yellow rock" if it names a place and "blond and strong (powerful)" if it is a Turkish given name for males or a surname. It may refer to:

== Place ==
- Sarıkaya, Bayramören
- Sarıkaya, Biga
- Sarıkaya, Çat
- Sarıkaya, Çorum
- Sarıkaya, Yozgat, a district center in Yozgat Province
- Sarıkaya, Adıyaman, a village in the central district of Adıyaman Province
- Sarıkaya, Besni, a village in the Besni district of Adıyaman Province
- Sarıkaya, Erdemli a village in Erdemlki district of Mersin Province
- Sarıkaya, Kıbrısçık a village in Kıbrısçık district of Bolu Province
- Sarıkaya, Nallıhan a village in Nallıhan district of Ankara Province
- Sarıkaya, Sungurlu
- Sarıkaya, Tercan
- Sarıkaya, Yapraklı
- Sarıkaya, Yığılca

== Surname ==
- Hazal Sarıkaya (born 1996), Turkish female swimmer
- Kübra Sarıkaya (born 1996), Turkish female handball player
- Serenay Sarıkaya (born 1992), Miss Turkey Universe 2010 titleholder, professional model and actress
