= Muratçayırı =

Muratçayırı can refer to:

- Muratçayırı, Çat
- Muratçayırı, Refahiye
