= Kargı, Beypazarı =

Kargı
- Neighbourhood
- Location in Turkey Kargı (Turkey Central Anatolia)
- Coordinates: 39.9661°N 31.7508°E
- Country: Turkey
- Province: Ankara
- District: Beypazarı
- Population (2022): 56
- Time zone: UTC+3 (TRT)

Kargı is a neighbourhood in the municipality and district of Beypazarı, Ankara Province, Turkey. Its population is 56 (2022).
