= Yiğerler, Beypazarı =

Yiğerler
- Neighbourhood
- Location in Turkey Yiğerler (Turkey Central Anatolia)
- Coordinates: 40°16′N 31°56′E
- Country: Turkey
- Province: Ankara
- District: Beypazarı
- Population (2022): 133
- Time zone: UTC+3 (TRT)

Yiğerler is a neighbourhood in the municipality and district of Beypazarı, Ankara Province, Turkey. Its population is 133 (2022).
