= Dibekören, Beypazarı =

Dibekören
- Neighbourhood
- Location in Turkey Dibekören (Turkey Central Anatolia)
- Coordinates: 40°18′N 31°54′E
- Country: Turkey
- Province: Ankara
- District: Beypazarı
- Population (2022): 44
- Time zone: UTC+3 (TRT)

Dibekören is a neighbourhood in the municipality and district of Beypazarı, Ankara Province, Turkey. Its population is 44 (2022).
