= Bardakçı, Çat =

Village in Turkey

Bardakçı
- Neighbourhood
- Location in Turkey
- Coordinates: 39°35′55″N 40°50′03″E
- Country: Turkey
- Province: Erzurum
- District: Çat
- Population (2022): 418
- Time zone: UTC+3 (TRT)

Bardakçı is a neighbourhood in the municipality and district of Çat, Erzurum Province in Turkey. Its population is 418 (2022).
