= Işkınlı, Çat =

Village in Turkey

Işkınlı
- Neighbourhood
- Location in Turkey
- Coordinates: 39°30′28″N 40°56′09″E
- Country: Turkey
- Province: Erzurum
- District: Çat
- Population (2022): 245
- Time zone: UTC+3 (TRT)

Işkınlı is a neighbourhood in the municipality and district of Çat, Erzurum Province in Turkey. Its population is 245 (2022).
