= Çamurlu, Savaştepe =

Village in Turkey

Çamurlu
- Neighbourhood
- Location in Turkey Çamurlu (Marmara)
- Coordinates: 39.462°N 27.675°E
- Country: Turkey
- Province: Balıkesir
- District: Savaştepe
- Population (2022): 90
- Time zone: UTC+3 (TRT)

Çamurlu is a neighbourhood in the municipality and district of Savaştepe, Balıkesir Province in Turkey. Its population is 90 (2022).
