= Uruş, Beypazarı =

Uruş
- Neighbourhood
- Location in Turkey Uruş (Turkey Central Anatolia)
- Coordinates: 40.2490°N 32.1379°E
- Country: Turkey
- Province: Ankara
- District: Beypazarı
- Population (2022): 276
- Time zone: UTC+3 (TRT)

Uruş is a neighbourhood of the municipality and district of Beypazarı, Ankara Province, Turkey. Its population is 276 (2022). Before the 2013 reorganisation, it was a town (belde).
