= Yukarıdanişment, Savaştepe =

Village in Turkey

Yukarıdanişment
- Neighbourhood
- Location in Turkey Yukarıdanişment (Marmara)
- Coordinates: 39.387°N 27.724°E
- Country: Turkey
- Province: Balıkesir
- District: Savaştepe
- Population (2022): 99
- Time zone: UTC+3 (TRT)

Yukarıdanişment is a neighbourhood in the municipality and district of Savaştepe, Balıkesir Province in Turkey. Its population is 99 (2022).
