= Babaderesi, Çat =

Village in Turkey

Babaderesi
- Neighbourhood
- Location in Turkey
- Coordinates: 39°31′19″N 40°55′27″E
- Country: Turkey
- Province: Erzurum
- District: Çat
- Population (2022): 73
- Time zone: UTC+3 (TRT)

Babaderesi is a neighbourhood in the municipality and district of Çat, Erzurum Province in Turkey. Its population is 73 (2022).
