= Kozağaç, Beypazarı =

Kozağaç
- Neighbourhood
- Location in Turkey Kozağaç (Turkey Central Anatolia)
- Coordinates: 40.2238°N 31.7867°E
- Country: Turkey
- Province: Ankara
- District: Beypazarı
- Population (2022): 47
- Time zone: UTC+3 (TRT)

Kozağaç is a neighbourhood in the municipality and district of Beypazarı in Ankara Province in central Turkey. Its population is 47 (2022).
