= Çiftlikdere, Savaştepe =

Village in Turkey

Çiftlikdere
- Neighbourhood
- Location in Turkey Çiftlikdere (Marmara)
- Coordinates: 39°27′09″N 27°36′21″E
- Country: Turkey
- Province: Balıkesir
- District: Savaştepe
- Population (2022): 43
- Time zone: UTC+3 (TRT)

Çiftlikdere is a neighbourhood in the municipality and district of Savaştepe, Balıkesir Province in Turkey. Its population is 43 (2022).
