= Sıtmapınar, Savaştepe =

Village in Turkey

Sıtmapınar
- Neighbourhood
- Location in Turkey Sıtmapınar (Marmara)
- Coordinates: 39°27′N 27°32′E
- Country: Turkey
- Province: Balıkesir
- District: Savaştepe
- Population (2022): 81
- Time zone: UTC+3 (TRT)

Sıtmapınar is a neighbourhood in the municipality and district of Savaştepe, Balıkesir Province in Turkey. Its population is 81 (2022).
