= Yarmak, Çat =

Village in Turkey

Yarmak
- Neighbourhood
- Location in Turkey
- Coordinates: 39°38′13″N 40°55′06″E
- Country: Turkey
- Province: Erzurum
- District: Çat
- Population (2022): 236
- Time zone: UTC+3 (TRT)

Yarmak is a neighbourhood in the municipality and district of Çat, Erzurum Province in Turkey. Its population is 236 (2022).
