= Çat =

- District and municipality
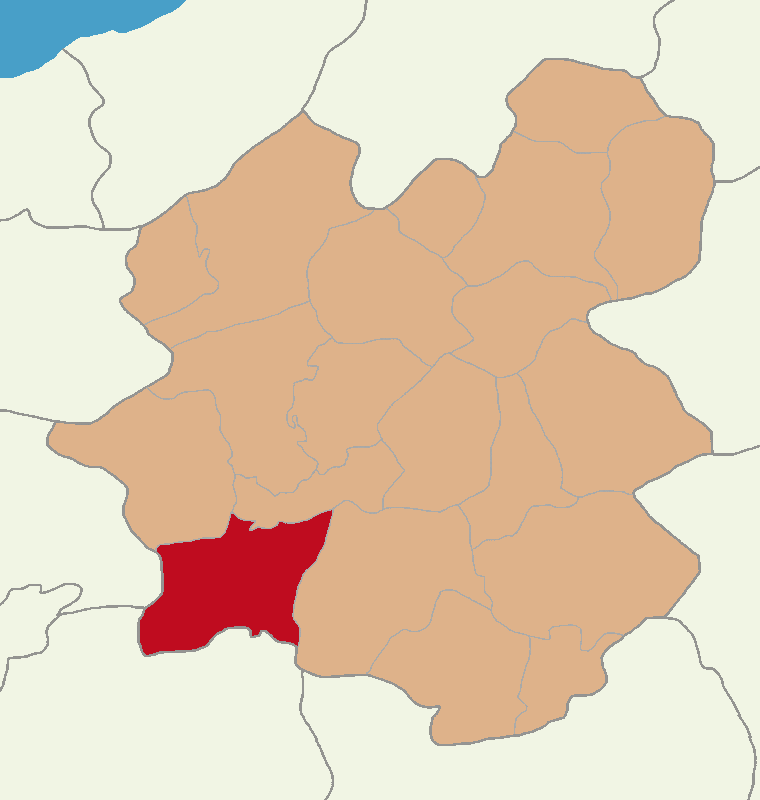
- Map showing Çat District in Erzurum Province

- Location within Turkey
- Coordinates: 39°36′40″N 40°58′44″E
- Country: Turkey
- Province: Erzurum

Government
  - Mayor: Arif Hikmet Kiliç (CHP)
- Area: 1,448 km^{2} (559 sq mi)
- Population (2022): 15,556
  - Density: 10.74/km^{2} (27.82/sq mi)
- Time zone: UTC+3 (TRT)
- Postal code: 25750
- Area code: 0442
- Climate: Dsb
- Website: www.erzurumcat.bel.tr

Çat (Kurdish: Oxlê) is a municipality and district of Erzurum Province, Turkey. Its area is 1,448 km^{2}, and its population is 15,556 (2022). The mayor is Arif Hikmet Kiliç (CHP).

== Composition ==
There are 45 neighbourhoods in Çat District:

- Ağaköy
- Aşağıçatköy
- Babaderesi
- Bağlıca
- Bardakçı
- Başköy
- Bayındır
- Bozyazı
- Budaklar
- Çayırtepe
- Çimenözü
- Çirişli
- Çukurçayır
- Değirmenli
- Elmapınar
- Göbekören
- Gökçeşeyh
- Gölköy
- Hatunköy
- Işkınlı
- Kaplıca
- Karabey
- Karaca
- Karaşeyh
- Kızılca
- Köseler
- Kumaşlı
- Kurbanlı
- Mollaömer
- Muratçayırı
- Oyuklu
- Parmaksız
- Saltaş
- Sarıkaşık
- Sarıkaya
- Şeyhhasan
- Söbeçayır
- Soğukpınar
- Taşağıl
- Tuzlataşı
- Tuzluca
- Yarmak
- Yavı
- Yaylasuyu
- Yukarıçat
