= Akçakavak, Beypazarı =

Akçakavak
- Neighbourhood
- Location in Turkey Akçakavak (Turkey Central Anatolia)
- Coordinates: 40.1140°N 32.0550°E
- Country: Turkey
- Province: Ankara
- District: Beypazarı
- Population (2022): 92
- Time zone: UTC+3 (TRT)

Akçakavak is a neighbourhood in the municipality and district of Beypazarı, Ankara Province, Turkey. Its population is 92 (2022).
