= Kocaoğlu, Yığılca =

Village in Turkey

Kocaoğlu
- Village
- Country: Turkey
- Province: Düzce
- District: Yığılca
- Population (2022): 233
- Time zone: UTC+3 (TRT)

Kocaoğlu is a village in the Yığılca District of Düzce Province in Turkey. Its population is 233 (2022).
