= İğneler, Yığılca =

Village in Turkey

İğneler
- Village
- Country: Turkey
- Province: Düzce
- District: Yığılca
- Population (2022): 177
- Time zone: UTC+3 (TRT)

İğneler is a village in the Yığılca District of Düzce Province in Turkey. Its population is 177 (2022).
