= Hıdırbalı, Savaştepe =

Village in Turkey

Hıdırbalı
- Neighbourhood
- Location in Turkey Hıdırbalı (Marmara)
- Coordinates: 39°21′N 27°47′E
- Country: Turkey
- Province: Balıkesir
- District: Savaştepe
- Population (2022): 18
- Time zone: UTC+3 (TRT)

Hıdırbalı is a neighbourhood in the municipality and district of Savaştepe, Balıkesir Province in Turkey. Its population is 18 (2022).
