= Yukarıçat, Çat =

Village in Turkey

Yukarıçat
- Neighbourhood
- Location in Turkey
- Coordinates: 39°40′N 41°01′E
- Country: Turkey
- Province: Erzurum
- District: Çat
- Population (2022): 159
- Time zone: UTC+3 (TRT)

Yukarıçat is a neighbourhood in the municipality and district of Çat, Erzurum Province in Turkey. Its population is 159 (2022).
