= Güvemküçüktarla, Savaştepe =

Village in Turkey

Güvemküçüktarla
- Neighbourhood
- Location in Turkey Güvemküçüktarla (Marmara)
- Coordinates: 39°28′N 27°43′E
- Country: Turkey
- Province: Balıkesir
- District: Savaştepe
- Population (2022): 248
- Time zone: UTC+3 (TRT)

Güvemküçüktarla is a neighbourhood in the municipality and district of Savaştepe, Balıkesir Province in Turkey. Its population is 248 (2022).
