= Harmancık, Beypazarı =

Harmancık
- Neighbourhood
- Country: Turkey
- Province: Ankara
- District: Beypazarı
- Population (2022): 67
- Time zone: UTC+3 (TRT)

Harmancık is a neighbourhood in the municipality and district of Beypazarı, Ankara Province, Turkey. Its population is 67 (2022).
