= Eyerci, Savaştepe =

Village in Turkey

Eyerci
- Neighbourhood
- Location in Turkey Eyerci (Marmara)
- Coordinates: 39.480°N 27.603°E
- Country: Turkey
- Province: Balıkesir
- District: Savaştepe
- Population (2022): 87
- Time zone: UTC+3 (TRT)

Eyerci is a neighbourhood in the municipality and district of Savaştepe, Balıkesir Province in Turkey. Its population is 87 (2022).
