= Kırık, Yığılca =

Village in Turkey

Kırık
- Village
- Country: Turkey
- Province: Düzce
- District: Yığılca
- Population (2022): 773
- Time zone: UTC+3 (TRT)

Kırık is a village in the Yığılca District of Düzce Province in Turkey. Its population was 773 in 2022.
