= Hacıyeri, Yığılca =

Village in Turkey

Coordinates: 40.935°N 31.464°E

Hacıyeri
- Village
- Location in Turkey
- Coordinates
- Country: Turkey
- Province: Düzce
- District: Yığılca
- Population (2022): 400
- Time zone: UTC+3 (TRT)

Hacıyeri is a village in the Yığılca District of Düzce Province in Turkey. Its population is 400 (2022).
