= Esenköy, Savaştepe =

Village in Turkey

Esenköy
- Neighbourhood
- Location in Turkey Esenköy (Marmara)
- Coordinates: 39.452°N 27.559°E
- Country: Turkey
- Province: Balıkesir
- District: Savaştepe
- Population (2022): 86
- Time zone: UTC+3 (TRT)

Esenköy is a neighbourhood in the municipality and district of Savaştepe, Balıkesir Province in Turkey. Its population in 2022 was 86.
