= Kalemköy, Savaştepe =

Village in Turkey

Kalemköy
- Neighbourhood
- Location in Turkey Kalemköy (Marmara)
- Coordinates: 39.508°N 27.726°E
- Country: Turkey
- Province: Balıkesir
- District: Savaştepe
- Population (2022): 65
- Time zone: UTC+3 (TRT)

Kalemköy is a neighbourhood in the municipality and district of Savaştepe, Balıkesir Province in Turkey. Its population is 65 (2022).
