= Çantırlı, Beypazarı =

Çantırlı
- Neighbourhood
- Location in Turkey Çantırlı (Turkey Central Anatolia)
- Coordinates: 40°08′N 31°47′E
- Country: Turkey
- Province: Ankara
- District: Beypazarı
- Population (2022): 137
- Time zone: UTC+3 (TRT)

Çantırlı is a neighbourhood in the municipality and district of Beypazarı, Ankara Province, Turkey. Its population is 137 (2022).
