= Savaş Buldan =

Kurdish businessman (1964–1994)

- Born: 6 May 1964; Yüksekova, Hakkari, Turkey
- Died: 3 June 1994 (aged 30); Yığılca, Bolu, Turkey
- Resting place: Avcılar cemetery, Istanbul
- Occupation: Businessman
- Spouse: Pervin Buldan (m. 1987)
- Children: two

Savaş Buldan (6 May 1964 – 3 June 1994) was a Kurdish businessman in Turkey. He was arrested by Turkish security forces and was found dead on 4 June 1994.

== Life ==
Savaş Buldan was born in Yüksekova on 6 May 1964 to Şükrü Buldan (father). His brother, Nejdet Buldan, is one of the former mayors of Yüksekova for the now defunct Democracy Party.

He was accused of carrying out activities in line with the Kurdistans Workers' Party (PKK) since 1979. The Public Prosecutor's Office launched an investigation against him in connection with the incidents that took place in Yüksekova, Hakkari, in March 1979. In 1986, he married Pervin Buldan.

He was among the persons, who provided lawyers for the persons, who were detained in connection with the Newroz incidents in March 1992.

In June 1992, when he was living in Istanbul, he was accused of supporting the PKK by the Turkish authorities.

Savaş Buldan was detained on 28 July 1992 in connection with certain arms seized in Haznedar neighborhood of İstanbul, and he was arrested by the SSC he was referred to.

== Death and aftermath ==
Along with Adnan Yıldırım and Hacı Karay, he was abducted by the Turkish security forces from Çınar Hotel in Yeşilyurt, İstanbul, on 3 June 1994. The abducted persons were found dead on 4 June 1994 on the road of Yukarıkaraş village of Yığılca district of Bolu in what is believed to be an extrajudicial killing. On the 3 June, Pervin Buldan gave birth to their daughter Zelal Buldan. Savaş Buldan and his two friends were buried at Avcılar cemetery, İstanbul.

After several investigations by the European Court of Human Rights (ECHR), Turkey was seen guilty for his death and the Turkish government was sentenced to pay Buldan's wife Pervin Buldan 10,000 Euros and to his brother Nejdet Buldan 16,000 Euros. In 2021, the Turkish crime boss Reis Sedat Peker accused Mehmet Ağar of being responsible for Buldans death.

== Personal life ==
Buldan was married to Pervin Buldan, and they had two children: Neçirvan and Zelal. On the 3 June, his wife gave birth to their daughter Zelal. Zelal would release a movie in memory of her father called Katharsis in June 2020. Following Savaş Buldan's murder, his brother, Nejdet Buldan, fled Turkey and settled in Germany.

== See also ==
- List of kidnappings
- List of solved missing person cases
- List of unsolved murders
