= Uşakgöl, Beypazarı =

Uşakgöl
- Neighbourhood
- Location in Turkey Uşakgöl (Turkey Central Anatolia)
- Coordinates: 40°18′N 31°55′E
- Country: Turkey
- Province: Ankara
- District: Beypazarı
- Population (2022): 85
- Time zone: UTC+3 (TRT)

Uşakgöl is a neighbourhood in the municipality and district of Beypazarı, Ankara Province, Turkey. Its population is 85 (2022).
