= Yukarıkaraçam, Savaştepe =

Village in Turkey

Yukarıkaraçam
- Neighbourhood
- Location in Turkey Yukarıkaraçam (Marmara)
- Coordinates: 39.381°N 27.780°E
- Country: Turkey
- Province: Balıkesir
- District: Savaştepe
- Population (2022): 39
- Time zone: UTC+3 (TRT)

Yukarıkaraçam is a neighbourhood in the municipality and district of Savaştepe, Balıkesir Province in Turkey. Its population is 39 (2022).
