= Oymaağaç, Beypazarı =

Oymaağaç
- Neighbourhood
- Location in Turkey Oymaağaç (Turkey Central Anatolia)
- Coordinates: 40.0495°N 31.9554°E
- Country: Turkey
- Province: Ankara
- District: Beypazarı
- Population (2022): 255
- Time zone: UTC+3 (TRT)

Oymaağaç is a neighborhood in the municipality and district of Beypazarı, Ankara Province, Turkey. Its population is 255 (2022).

== Name ==
The locality's name is listed as Oyumağacı (1487), Oyumağaç (1530, 1572), Oymaağaç (1893) in Ottoman records. Oymaağaç means literally "carved tree" (Turkish: oyma + ağaç).
