= Karacaören, Beypazarı =

Karacaören
- Neighbourhood
- Location in Turkey Karacaören (Turkey Central Anatolia)
- Coordinates: 40.2858°N 31.9621°E
- Country: Turkey
- Province: Ankara
- District: Beypazarı
- Population (2022): 90
- Time zone: UTC+3 (TRT)

Karacaören is a neighbourhood in the municipality and district of Beypazarı, Ankara Province, Turkey. Its population is 90 (2022).
