= Çaltılı, Savaştepe =

Village in Turkey

Çaltılı
- Neighbourhood
- Location in Turkey Çaltılı (Marmara)
- Coordinates: 39.470°N 27.743°E
- Country: Turkey
- Province: Balıkesir
- District: Savaştepe
- Population (2022): 59
- Time zone: UTC+3 (TRT)

Çaltılı is a neighbourhood in the municipality and district of Savaştepe, Balıkesir Province in Turkey. Its population is 59 (2022).
