= Redifler, Yığılca =

Village in Turkey

Redifler
- Village
- Location in Turkey
- Coordinates: 40°57′20″N 31°27′34″E
- Country: Turkey
- Province: Düzce
- District: Yığılca
- Population (2022): 495
- Time zone: UTC+3 (TRT)

Redifler is a village in the Yığılca District of Düzce Province in Turkey. Its population is 495 (2022).
