= Yaylatepe, Yığılca =

Village in Turkey

Yaylatepe
- Village
- Country: Turkey
- Province: Düzce
- District: Yığılca
- Population (2022): 51
- Time zone: UTC+3 (TRT)

Yaylatepe is a village in the Yığılca District of Düzce Province in Turkey. Its population is 51 (2022).
