= Naşlar, Yığılca =

Village in Turkey

Naşlar
- Village
- Location in Turkey
- Coordinates: 40°58′N 31°25′E
- Country: Turkey
- Province: Düzce
- District: Yığılca
- Population (2022): 256
- Time zone: UTC+3 (TRT)

Naşlar is a village in the Yığılca District of Düzce Province in Turkey. Its population is 256 (2022).
