= Akçaören, Yığılca =

Village in Turkey

Akçaören
- Village
- Location in Turkey
- Coordinates: 40.9396°N 31.2925°E
- Country: Turkey
- Province: Düzce
- District: Yığılca
- Population (2022): 178
- Time zone: UTC+3 (TRT)

Akçaören is a village in the Yığılca District of Düzce Province in Turkey. Its population is 178 (2022).
