= Hoşafoğlu, Yığılca =

Village in Turkey

Hoşafoğlu
- Village
- Location in Turkey
- Coordinates: 40°57′N 31°23′E
- Country: Turkey
- Province: Düzce
- District: Yığılca
- Population (2022): 289
- Time zone: UTC+3 (TRT)

Hoşafoğlu is a village in the Yığılca District of Düzce Province in Turkey. Its population is 289 (2022).
