= Kerbanlar, Beypazarı =

Kerbanlar
- Neighbourhood
- Location in Turkey Kerbanlar (Turkey Central Anatolia)
- Coordinates: 40°18′N 31°56′E
- Country: Turkey
- Province: Ankara
- District: Beypazarı
- Population (2022): 65
- Time zone: UTC+3 (TRT)

Kerbanlar is a neighbourhood in the municipality and district of Beypazarı, Ankara Province, Turkey. Its population is 65 (2022).
