= Tıraşlar, Yığılca =

Village in Turkey

Tıraşlar
- Village
- Location in Turkey
- Coordinates: 40°58′N 31°26′E
- Country: Turkey
- Province: Düzce
- District: Yığılca
- Population (2022): 244
- Time zone: UTC+3 (TRT)

Tıraşlar is a village in the Yığılca District of Düzce Province in Turkey. Its population is 244 (2022).
