= Dikmeler, Savaştepe =

Village in Turkey

Dikmeler
- Neighbourhood
- Location in Turkey Dikmeler (Marmara)
- Coordinates: 39°22′N 27°45′E
- Country: Turkey
- Province: Balıkesir
- District: Savaştepe
- Population (2022): 141
- Time zone: UTC+3 (TRT)

Dikmeler is a neighbourhood in the municipality and district of Savaştepe, Balıkesir Province in Turkey. Its population is 141 (2022).
