= Hacılar, Yığılca =

Village in Turkey

Hacılar
- Village
- Location in Turkey
- Coordinates: 40.97416°N 31.50865°E
- Country: Turkey
- Province: Düzce
- District: Yığılca
- Population (2022): 403
- Time zone: UTC+3 (TRT)

Hacılar is a village in the Yığılca District of Düzce Province in Turkey. Its population is 403 (2022).
