= Çirişli, Çat =

Village in Turkey

Çirişli
- Neighbourhood
- Location in Turkey
- Coordinates: 39°31′N 40°58′E
- Country: Turkey
- Province: Erzurum
- District: Çat
- Population (2022): 102
- Time zone: UTC+3 (TRT)

Çirişli is a neighbourhood in the municipality and district of Çat, Erzurum Province in Turkey. Its population is 102 (2022).
