= Mahmutlar, Beypazarı =

Mahmutlar
- Neighbourhood
- Location in Turkey Mahmutlar (Turkey Central Anatolia)
- Coordinates: 39.8912°N 31.8998°E
- Country: Turkey
- Province: Ankara
- District: Beypazarı
- Population (2022): 188
- Time zone: UTC+3 (TRT)

Mahmutlar is a neighbourhood in the municipality and district of Beypazarı, Ankara Province, Turkey. Its population is 188 (2022).
