= Köst, Beypazarı =

Köst
- Neighbourhood
- Location in Turkey Köst (Turkey Central Anatolia)
- Coordinates: 40°16′N 31°51′E
- Country: Turkey
- Province: Ankara
- District: Beypazarı
- Population (2022): 112
- Time zone: UTC+3 (TRT)

Köst is a neighbourhood in the municipality and district of Beypazarı, Ankara Province, Turkey. Its population is 112 (2022).
