= Dutlar, Yığılca =

Village in Turkey

Dutlar
- Village
- Country: Turkey
- Province: Düzce
- District: Yığılca
- Population (2022): 305
- Time zone: UTC+3 (TRT)

Dutlar is a village in the Yığılca District of Düzce Province in Turkey. Its population is 305 (2022).
