= Hırkatepe, Beypazarı =

Hırkatepe
- Neighbourhood
- Location in Turkey Hırkatepe (Turkey Central Anatolia)
- Coordinates: 40°12′N 31°45′E
- Country: Turkey
- Province: Ankara
- District: Beypazarı
- Population (2022): 114
- Time zone: UTC+3 (TRT)

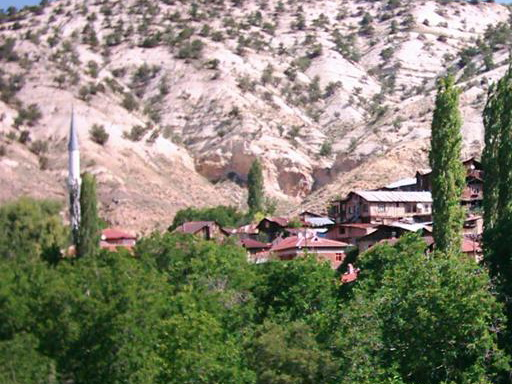
Photograph of Hırktepe Beypazarı

Hırkatepe is a neighbourhood in the municipality and district of Beypazarı, Ankara Province, Turkey. As of 2022, its population was 114.
