= Kuyucak, Beypazarı =

Kuyucak
- Neighbourhood
- Location in Turkey Kuyucak (Turkey Central Anatolia)
- Coordinates: 40.1561°N 31.8279°E
- Country: Turkey
- Province: Ankara
- District: Beypazarı
- Population (2022): 145
- Time zone: UTC+3 (TRT)

Kuyucak is a neighbourhood in the municipality and district of Beypazarı, Ankara Province, Turkey. Its population is 145 (2022).
