= Bozyazı, Çat =

Village in Turkey

Bozyazı
- Neighbourhood
- Country: Turkey
- Province: Erzurum
- District: Çat
- Population (2022): 228
- Time zone: UTC+3 (TRT)

Bozyazı is a neighbourhood in the municipality and district of Çat, Erzurum Province in Turkey. As of 2022 its population is 228.
