= İncepelit, Beypazarı =

İncepelit
- Neighbourhood
- Location in Turkey İncepelit (Turkey Central Anatolia)
- Coordinates: 40°11′N 32°04′E
- Country: Turkey
- Province: Ankara
- District: Beypazarı
- Population (2022): 114
- Time zone: UTC+3 (TRT)

İncepelit is a Turkish village in the municipality and district of Beypazarı, Ankara Province, Turkey. Its population is 114 (2022).
