= Kuyumcutekke, Beypazarı =

Kuyumcutekke
- Neighbourhood
- Location in Turkey Kuyumcutekke (Turkey Central Anatolia)
- Coordinates: 40°12′N 31°58′E
- Country: Turkey
- Province: Ankara
- District: Beypazarı
- Population (2022): 163
- Time zone: UTC+3 (TRT)

Kuyumcutekke is a neighbourhood in the municipality and district of Beypazarı, Ankara Province, Turkey. Its population is 163 (2022).
