= Başören, Beypazarı =

Başören
- Neighbourhood
- Location in Turkey Başören (Turkey Central Anatolia)
- Coordinates: 40.2211°N 31.8638°E
- Country: Turkey
- Province: Ankara
- District: Beypazarı
- Population (2022): 37
- Time zone: UTC+3 (TRT)

Başören is a neighbourhood in the municipality and district of Beypazarı, Ankara Province, Turkey. Its population is 37 (2022).
