= Kırşeyhler, Beypazarı =

Kırşeyhler
- Neighbourhood
- Location in Turkey Kırşeyhler (Turkey Central Anatolia)
- Coordinates: 39°55′N 31°51′E
- Country: Turkey
- Province: Ankara
- District: Beypazarı
- Population (2022): 246
- Time zone: UTC+3 (TRT)

Kırşeyhler is a neighbourhood in the municipality and district of Beypazarı, Ankara Province, Turkey. Its population is 246 (2022).
