= Bayındır, Çat =

Village in Turkey

Bayındır
- Neighbourhood
- Country: Turkey
- Province: Erzurum
- District: Çat
- Population (2022): 118
- Time zone: UTC+3 (TRT)

Bayındır is a neighbourhood in the municipality and district of Çat, Erzurum Province in Turkey. Its population is 118 (2022).
