= Mikail, Beypazarı =

Mikail
- Neighbourhood
- Location in Turkey Mikail (Turkey Central Anatolia)
- Coordinates: 40.2679°N 31.8849°E
- Country: Turkey
- Province: Ankara
- District: Beypazarı
- Population (2022): 62
- Time zone: UTC+3 (TRT)

Mikail is a neighbourhood in the municipality and district of Beypazarı, Ankara Province, Turkey. Its population is 62 (2022).
