= Bekirler, Yığılca =

Village in Turkey

Bekirler
- Village
- Location in Turkey
- Coordinates: 40.9551°N 31.5214°E
- Country: Turkey
- Province: Düzce
- District: Yığılca
- Population (2022): 447
- Time zone: UTC+3 (TRT)

Bekirler is a village in the Yığılca District of Düzce Province in Turkey. Its population is 447 (2022).
