= Hocatman, Yığılca =

Village in Turkey

Hocatman
- Village
- Location in Turkey
- Coordinates: 40°56′N 31°27′E
- Country: Turkey
- Province: Düzce
- District: Yığılca
- Population (2022): 243
- Time zone: UTC+3 (TRT)

Hocatman is a village in the Yığılca District of Düzce Province in Turkey. Its population is 243 (2022).
