= Söğütlügözle, Savaştepe =

Village in Turkey

Söğütlügözle
- Neighbourhood
- Location in Turkey Söğütlügözle (Marmara)
- Coordinates: 39°24′N 27°46′E
- Country: Turkey
- Province: Balıkesir
- District: Savaştepe
- Population (2022): 68
- Time zone: UTC+3 (TRT)

Söğütlügözle is a neighbourhood in the municipality and district of Savaştepe, Balıkesir Province in Turkey. Its population is 68 (2022).
