= Aksaklar, Yığılca =

Village in Turkey

Aksaklar
- Village
- Location in Turkey
- Coordinates: 40.9859°N 31.4756°E
- Country: Turkey
- Province: Düzce
- District: Yığılca
- Population (2022): 804
- Time zone: UTC+3 (TRT)

Aksaklar is a village in the Yığılca District of Düzce Province in Turkey. Its population is 804 (2022).
