= Karaören, Beypazarı =

Karaören
- Neighbourhood
- Location in Turkey Karaören (Turkey Central Anatolia)
- Coordinates: 40.2873°N 31.8964°E
- Country: Turkey
- Province: Ankara
- District: Beypazarı
- Population (2022): 43
- Time zone: UTC+3 (TRT)

Karaören is a neighbourhood in the municipality and district of Beypazarı, Ankara Province, Turkey. Its population is 43 (2022).
