= Ağaköy, Çat =

Village in Turkey

Ağaköy
- Neighbourhood
- Location in Turkey
- Coordinates: 39°36′20″N 41°00′41″E
- Country: Turkey
- Province: Erzurum
- District: Çat
- Population (2022): 801
- Time zone: UTC+3 (TRT)

Ağaköy is a neighbourhood in the municipality and district of Çat, Erzurum Province in Turkey. Its population is 801 (2022).
