= Yunakdere, Savaştepe =

Village in Turkey

Yunakdere
- Neighbourhood
- Location in Turkey Yunakdere (Marmara)
- Coordinates: 39°31′56″N 27°39′54″E
- Country: Turkey
- Province: Balıkesir
- District: Savaştepe
- Population (2022): 160
- Time zone: UTC+3 (TRT)

Yunakdere is a neighbourhood in the municipality and district of Savaştepe, Balıkesir Province in Turkey. Its population is 160 (2022).
