= Güney, Yığılca =

Village in Turkey

Güney
- Village
- Country: Turkey
- Province: Düzce
- District: Yığılca
- Population (2022): 200
- Time zone: UTC+3 (TRT)

Güney is a village in the Yığılca District of Düzce Province in Turkey. Its population is 200 (2022).
