= Beyköy, Savaştepe =

Village in Turkey

Beyköy
- Neighbourhood
- Location in Turkey Beyköy (Marmara)
- Coordinates: 39°28′40″N 27°37′39″E
- Country: Turkey
- Province: Balıkesir
- District: Savaştepe
- Population (2022): 59
- Time zone: UTC+3 (TRT)

Beyköy is a neighbourhood in the municipality and district of Savaştepe, Balıkesir Province in Turkey. Its population is 59 (2022).
