= Batça, Beypazarı =

Batça
- Neighbourhood
- Location in Turkey Batça (Turkey Central Anatolia)
- Coordinates: 40°17′N 31°52′E
- Country: Turkey
- Province: Ankara
- District: Beypazarı
- Population (2022): 35
- Time zone: UTC+3 (TRT)

Batça is a neighbourhood in the municipality and district of Beypazarı, Ankara Province, Turkey. Its population is 35 (2022).
