= Söbeçayır, Çat =

Village in Turkey

Söbeçayır
- Neighbourhood
- Location in Turkey
- Coordinates: 39°26′27″N 40°42′38″E
- Country: Turkey
- Province: Erzurum
- District: Çat
- Population (2022): 331
- Time zone: UTC+3 (TRT)

Söbeçayır is a neighbourhood in the municipality and district of Çat, Erzurum Province in Turkey. Its population is 331 (2022).
