= Aşağıdanişment, Savaştepe =

Village in Turkey

Aşağıdanişment
- Neighbourhood
- Location in Turkey Aşağıdanişment (Marmara)
- Coordinates: 39°22′32″N 27°42′52″E
- Country: Turkey
- Province: Balıkesir
- District: Savaştepe
- Population (2022): 178
- Time zone: UTC+3 (TRT)

Aşağıdanişment is a neighbourhood in the municipality and district of Savaştepe, Balıkesir Province in Turkey. Its population is 178 (2022).
