= Oyuklu, Çat =

Village in Turkey

Oyuklu
- Neighbourhood
- Location in Turkey
- Coordinates: 39°36′32″N 40°58′40″E
- Country: Turkey
- Province: Erzurum
- District: Çat
- Population (2022): 1,910
- Time zone: UTC+3 (TRT)

Oyuklu is a neighbourhood in the municipality and district of Çat, Erzurum Province in Turkey. Its population was 1,910 in 2022.
