= İsadere, Savaştepe =

Village in Turkey

İsadere
- Neighbourhood
- Location in Turkey İsadere (Marmara)
- Coordinates: 39°30′N 27°35′E
- Country: Turkey
- Province: Balıkesir
- District: Savaştepe
- Population (2022): 240
- Time zone: UTC+3 (TRT)

İsadere is a neighbourhood in the municipality and district of Savaştepe, Balıkesir Province in Turkey. Its population is 240 (2022).
