= Karapınar, Savaştepe =

Village in Turkey

Karapınar
- Neighbourhood
- Location in Turkey Karapınar (Marmara)
- Coordinates: 39.517°N 27.638°E
- Country: Turkey
- Province: Balıkesir
- District: Savaştepe
- Population (2022): 140
- Time zone: UTC+3 (TRT)

Karapınar is a neighbourhood in the municipality and district of Savaştepe, Balıkesir Province in Turkey. Its population is 140 (2022).
