= Soğucak, Savaştepe =

Village in Turkey

Soğucak
- Neighbourhood
- Location in Turkey Soğucak (Marmara)
- Coordinates: 39.506°N 27.674°E
- Country: Turkey
- Province: Balıkesir
- District: Savaştepe
- Population (2022): 175
- Time zone: UTC+3 (TRT)

Soğucak is a neighbourhood in the municipality and district of Savaştepe, Balıkesir Province in Turkey. Its population is 175 (2022).
