= Doğanyurt, Beypazarı =

Doğanyurt
- Neighbourhood
- Location in Turkey Doğanyurt (Turkey Central Anatolia)
- Coordinates: 40.2500°N 31.8500°E
- Country: Turkey
- Province: Ankara
- District: Beypazarı
- Population (2022): 55
- Time zone: UTC+3 (TRT)

Doğanyurt is a neighbourhood in the municipality and district of Beypazarı, Ankara Province, Turkey. Its population is 55 (2022).
