= Aydınyayla, Yığılca =

Village in Turkey

Aydınyayla
- Village
- Location in Turkey
- Coordinates: 40.9959°N 31.5471°E
- Country: Turkey
- Province: Düzce
- District: Yığılca
- Population (2022): 191
- Time zone: UTC+3 (TRT)

Aydınyayla is a village in the Yığılca District of Düzce Province in Turkey. Its population is 191 (2022).
