= Çakıloba, Beypazarı =

Çakıloba
- Neighbourhood
- Location in Turkey Çakıloba (Turkey Central Anatolia)
- Coordinates: 40°12′N 31°51′E
- Country: Turkey
- Province: Ankara
- District: Beypazarı
- Population (2022): 124
- Time zone: UTC+3 (TRT)

Çakıloba is a neighbourhood in the municipality and district of Beypazarı, Ankara Province, Turkey. Its population is 124 (2022).
