= Hebeler, Yığılca =

Village in Turkey

Hebeler
- Village
- Location in Turkey
- Coordinates: 40°58′12″N 31°27′32″E
- Country: Turkey
- Province: Düzce
- District: Yığılca
- Population (2022): 343
- Time zone: UTC+3 (TRT)

Hebeler is a village in the Yığılca District of Düzce Province in Turkey. Its population is 343 (2022).
