= Şeyhhasan, Çat =

Village in Turkey

Şeyhhasan
- Neighbourhood
- Country: Turkey
- Province: Erzurum
- District: Çat
- Population (2022): 411
- Time zone: UTC+3 (TRT)

Şeyhhasan is a neighbourhood in the municipality and district of Çat, Erzurum Province in Turkey. Its population is 411 (2022).
