= Mençeler, Beypazarı =

Mençeler
- Neighbourhood
- Location in Turkey Mençeler (Turkey Central Anatolia)
- Coordinates: 40°16′N 31°52′E
- Country: Turkey
- Province: Ankara
- District: Beypazarı
- Population (2022): 29
- Time zone: UTC+3 (TRT)

Mençeler is a neighbourhood in the municipality and district of Beypazarı, Ankara Province, Turkey. Its population is 29 (2022).
