= Üreğil, Beypazarı =

Üreğil
- Neighbourhood
- Location in Turkey Üreğil (Turkey Central Anatolia)
- Coordinates: 40.2604°N 32.0776°E
- Country: Turkey
- Province: Ankara
- District: Beypazarı
- Population (2022): 348
- Time zone: UTC+3 (TRT)

Üreğil is a neighbourhood in the municipality and district of Beypazarı, Ankara Province, Turkey. Its population is 348 (2022).
