= Gürsöğüt, Beypazarı =

Gürsöğüt
- Neighbourhood
- Location in Turkey Gürsöğüt (Turkey Central Anatolia)
- Coordinates: 39°55′N 31°47′E
- Country: Turkey
- Province: Ankara
- District: Beypazarı
- Population (2022): 276
- Time zone: UTC+3 (TRT)

Gürsöğüt is a neighbourhood in the municipality and district of Beypazarı, Ankara Province, Turkey. Its population is 276 (2022).
