= Yığılca District =

District of Düzce Province, Turkey

- District
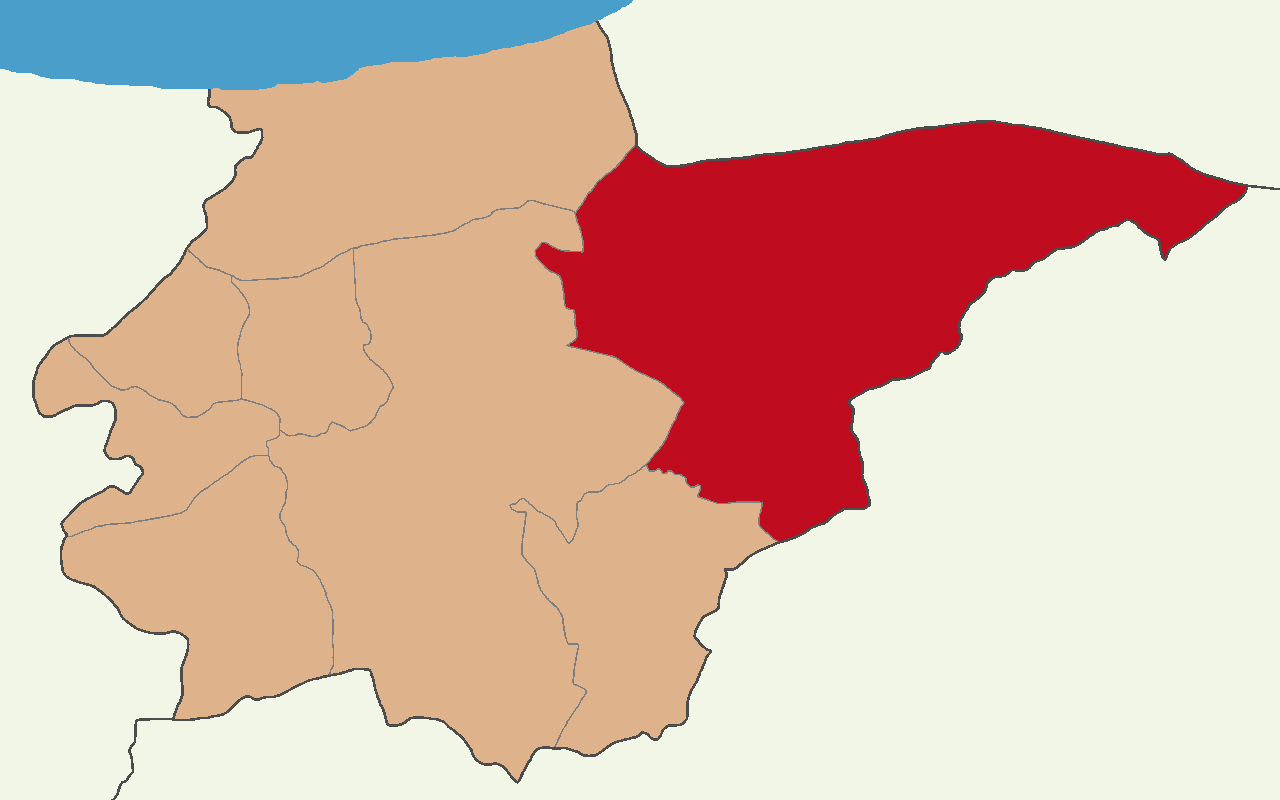
- Map showing Yığılca District in Düzce Province

- Location in Turkey
- Coordinates: 40°58′N 31°27′E
- Country: Turkey
- Province: Düzce
- Seat: Yığılca

Government
  - Kaymakam: Talha Altuntaş
- Area: 636 km^{2} (246 sq mi)
- Population (2022): 13,915
  - Density: 22/km^{2} (57/sq mi)
- Time zone: UTC+3 (TRT)
- Website: www.yigilca.gov.tr

Yığılca District is a district of the Düzce Province of Turkey. Its seat is the town of Yığılca. Its area is 636 km^{2}, and its population is 13,915 (2022).

== Composition ==
There is one municipality in Yığılca District:

- Yığılca

There are 39 villages in Yığılca District:

- Akçaören
- Aksaklar
- Asar
- Aydınyayla
- Bekirler
- Çamlı
- Çiftlikköy
- Çukurören
- Dibektaş
- Doğanlar
- Dutlar
- Gaziler
- Gelenöz
- Geriş
- Gökçeağaç
- Güney
- Hacılar
- Hacıyeri
- Hebeler
- Hocaköy
- Hocatman
- Hoşafoğlu
- İğneler
- Karakaş
- Kırık
- Kocaoğlu
- Köseler
- Mengen
- Naşlar
- Orhangazi
- Redifler
- Sarıkaya
- Tıraşlar
- Tuğrul
- Yağcılar
- Yaylatepe
- Yeniyer
- Yılgı
- Yoğunpelit
