= Karaçam, Savaştepe =

Village in Turkey

Karaçam
- Neighbourhood
- Location in Turkey Karaçam (Marmara)
- Coordinates: 39°20′51″N 27°39′17″E
- Country: Turkey
- Province: Balıkesir
- District: Savaştepe
- Population (2022): 247
- Time zone: UTC+3 (TRT)

Karaçam is a neighbourhood in the municipality and district of Savaştepe, Balıkesir Province in Turkey. Its population is 247 (2022).
