= Tavşancık, Savaştepe =

Village in Turkey

Tavşancık
- Neighbourhood
- Location in Turkey Tavşancık (Marmara)
- Coordinates: 39°25′24″N 27°43′29″E
- Country: Turkey
- Province: Balıkesir
- District: Savaştepe
- Population (2022): 108
- Time zone: UTC+3 (TRT)

Tavşancık is a neighbourhood in the municipality and district of Savaştepe, Balıkesir Province in Turkey. Its population is 108 (2022).
