= Kızılca, Çat =

Village in Turkey

Kızılca
- Neighbourhood
- Location in Turkey
- Coordinates: 39°37′28″N 41°00′30″E
- Country: Turkey
- Province: Erzurum
- District: Çat
- Population (2022): 606
- Time zone: UTC+3 (TRT)

Kızılca is a neighbourhood in the municipality and district of Çat, Erzurum Province in Turkey. Its population is 606 (2022).
