= Yukarıgüney, Beypazarı =

Yukarıgüney
- Neighbourhood
- Location in Turkey Yukarıgüney (Turkey Central Anatolia)
- Coordinates: 40.3132°N 31.7891°E
- Country: Turkey
- Province: Ankara
- District: Beypazarı
- Population (2022): 22
- Time zone: UTC+3 (TRT)

Yukarıgüney is a neighbourhood in the municipality and district of Beypazarı, Ankara Province, Turkey. Its population is 22 (2022).
