= Yaylasuyu, Çat =

Village in Turkey

Yaylasuyu
- Neighbourhood
- Location in Turkey
- Coordinates: 39°43′23″N 40°55′06″E
- Country: Turkey
- Province: Erzurum
- District: Çat
- Population (2022): 229
- Time zone: UTC+3 (TRT)

Yaylasuyu is a neighbourhood in the municipality and district of Çat, Erzurum Province in Turkey. Its population is 229 (2022).
