= Kongurca, Savaştepe =

Village in Turkey

Kongurca
- Neighbourhood
- Location in Turkey Kongurca (Marmara)
- Coordinates: 39°23′N 27°32′E
- Country: Turkey
- Province: Balıkesir
- District: Savaştepe
- Population (2022): 42
- Time zone: UTC+3 (TRT)

Kongurca is a neighbourhood in the municipality and district of Savaştepe, Balıkesir Province in Turkey. Its population is 42 (2022).
