= Karacalar, Savaştepe =

Village in Turkey

Karacalar
- Neighbourhood
- Location in Turkey Karacalar (Marmara)
- Coordinates: 39.433°N 27.645°E
- Country: Turkey
- Province: Balıkesir
- District: Savaştepe
- Population (2022): 616
- Time zone: UTC+3 (TRT)

Karacalar is a neighbourhood in the municipality and district of Savaştepe, Balıkesir Province in Turkey. Its population is 616 (2022).
