= Tahir, Beypazarı =

Tahir
- Neighbourhood
- Location in Turkey Tahir (Turkey Central Anatolia)
- Coordinates: 40.0286°N 31.8710°E
- Country: Turkey
- Province: Ankara
- District: Beypazarı
- Population (2022): 226
- Time zone: UTC+3 (TRT)

Tahir is a neighbourhood in the municipality and district of Beypazarı, Ankara Province, Turkey. Its population is 226 (2022).
