= Minnetler, Savaştepe =

Village in Turkey

Minnetler
- Neighbourhood
- Location in Turkey Minnetler (Marmara)
- Coordinates: 39.479°N 27.560°E
- Country: Turkey
- Province: Balıkesir
- District: Savaştepe
- Population (2022): 216
- Time zone: UTC+3 (TRT)

Minnetler is a neighbourhood in the municipality and district of Savaştepe, Balıkesir Province in Turkey. Its population is 216 (2022).
