= Kabalar, Beypazarı =

Kabalar
- Neighbourhood
- Location in Turkey Kabalar (Turkey Central Anatolia)
- Coordinates: 40.2822°N 31.8823°E
- Country: Turkey
- Province: Ankara
- District: Beypazarı
- Population (2022): 48
- Time zone: UTC+3 (TRT)

Kabalar is a neighbourhood in the municipality and district of Beypazarı, Ankara Province, Turkey. Its population is 48 (2022).
