= Çukurören, Yığılca =

Village in Turkey

Çukurören
- Village
- Location in Turkey
- Coordinates: 40.960°N 31.546°E
- Country: Turkey
- Province: Düzce
- District: Yığılca
- Population (2022): 253
- Time zone: UTC+3 (TRT)

Çukurören is a village in the Yığılca District of Düzce Province in Turkey. Its population is 253 (2022).
