= Gökçeağaç, Yığılca =

Village in Turkey

Gökçeağaç
- Village
- Location in Turkey
- Coordinates: 40.9292°N 31.4241°E
- Country: Turkey
- Province: Düzce
- District: Yığılca
- Population (2022): 573
- Time zone: UTC+3 (TRT)

Gökçeağaç is a village in the Yığılca District of Düzce Province in Turkey. Its population is 573 (2022).
