= Boyalı, Beypazarı =

Boyalı
- Neighbourhood
- Location in Turkey Boyalı (Turkey Central Anatolia)
- Coordinates: 40.2419°N 31.8720°E
- Country: Turkey
- Province: Ankara
- District: Beypazarı
- Population (2022): 83
- Time zone: UTC+3 (TRT)

Boyalı is a neighbourhood in the municipality and district of Beypazarı, Ankara Province, Turkey. Its population is 83 (2022).
