= Türediler, Savaştepe =

Village in Turkey

Türediler
- Neighbourhood
- Location in Turkey Türediler (Marmara)
- Coordinates: 39°26′N 27°31′E
- Country: Turkey
- Province: Balıkesir
- District: Savaştepe
- Population (2022): 83
- Time zone: UTC+3 (TRT)

Türediler is a neighbourhood in the municipality and district of Savaştepe, Balıkesir Province in Turkey. Its population is 83 (2022).
