= Tuzlataşı, Çat =

Village in Turkey

Tuzlataşı
- Neighbourhood
- Location in Turkey
- Coordinates: 39°31′38″N 40°59′49″E
- Country: Turkey
- Province: Erzurum
- District: Çat
- Population (2022): 366
- Time zone: UTC+3 (TRT)

Tuzlataşı is a neighbourhood in the municipality and district of Çat, Erzurum Province in Turkey. Its population is 366 (2022).
