= Savaştepe =

- District and municipality
- Map showing Savaştepe District in Balıkesir Province

- Location in Turkey Savaştepe (Marmara)
- Coordinates: 39°23′2″N 27°39′17″E
- Country: Turkey
- Province: Balıkesir

Government
  - Mayor: Ali Koyuncu (CHP)
- Area: 427 km^{2} (165 sq mi)
- Elevation: 315 m (1,033 ft)
- Population (2022): 16,765
  - Density: 39.3/km^{2} (102/sq mi)
- Time zone: UTC+3 (TRT)
- Postal code: 10580
- Area code: 0266
- Website: savastepe.bel.tr

Savaştepe is a municipality and district of Balıkesir Province, Turkey. Its area is 427 km^{2}, and its population is 16,765 (2022). Its elevation is 315 m (1,033 ft). The mayor is Ali Koyuncu (CHP).

== Composition ==
There are 50 neighbourhoods in Savaştepe District:

- Akpınar
- Ardıçlı
- Aşağıdanişment
- Beyköy
- Bozalan
- Çaltılı
- Çamurlu
- Çavlı
- Çiftlikdere
- Çukurçayır
- Cumhuriyet
- Deveören
- Dikmeler
- Esenköy
- Eyerci
- Fatih
- Güvem
- Güvemküçüktarla
- Hıdırbalı
- Hürriyet
- İsadere
- İstiklal
- Kalemköy
- Karacalar
- Karaçam
- Karapınar
- Kocabıyıklar
- Kocaören
- Koğukyurt
- Kongurca
- Kurudere
- Madenmezarı
- Mecidiye
- Minnetler
- Pelitcik
- Sarıbeyler
- Sarısüleymanlar
- Sıtmapınar
- Soğucak
- Söğütçük
- Söğütlügözle
- Tavşancık
- Türediler
- Yazören
- Yeşilhisar
- Yolcupınarı
- Yukarıdanişment
- Yukarıkaraçam
- Yunakdere
- Zafer
