= Sarıağıl, Beypazarı =

Sarıağıl
- Neighbourhood
- Location in Turkey Sarıağıl (Turkey Central Anatolia)
- Coordinates: 40.2105°N 31.8319°E
- Country: Turkey
- Province: Ankara
- District: Beypazarı
- Population (2022): 35
- Time zone: UTC+3 (TRT)

Sarıağıl is a neighbourhood in the municipality and district of Beypazarı, Ankara Province, Turkey. Its population is 35 (2022).
