= Başköy, Çat =

Village in Turkey

Başköy
- Neighbourhood
- Location in Turkey
- Coordinates: 39°42′56″N 41°10′14″E
- Country: Turkey
- Province: Erzurum
- District: Çat
- Population (2022): 620
- Time zone: UTC+3 (TRT)

Başköy is a neighbourhood in the municipality and district of Çat, Erzurum Province in Turkey. Its population is 620 (2022).
