= Aşağıgüney, Beypazarı =

Aşağıgüney
- Neighbourhood
- Location in Turkey Aşağıgüney (Turkey Central Anatolia)
- Coordinates: 40.3167°N 31.7660°E
- Country: Turkey
- Province: Ankara
- District: Beypazarı
- Population (2022): 27
- Time zone: UTC+3 (TRT)

Aşağıgüney is a neighbourhood in the municipality and district of Beypazarı, Ankara Province, Turkey. Its population is 27 (2022).
