= Karaca, Çat =

Village in Turkey

Karaca
- Neighbourhood
- Country: Turkey
- Province: Erzurum
- District: Çat
- Population (2022): 261
- Time zone: UTC+3 (TRT)

Karaca is a neighbourhood in the municipality and district of Çat, Erzurum in Turkey. Its population is 261 (2022).
