= Dereli, Beypazarı =

Dereli
- Neighbourhood
- Location in Turkey Dereli (Turkey Central Anatolia)
- Coordinates: 40.3168°N 32.0719°E
- Country: Turkey
- Province: Ankara
- District: Beypazarı
- Population (2022): 109
- Time zone: UTC+3 (TRT)

Dereli is a neighbourhood in the municipality and district of Beypazarı, Ankara Province, Turkey. Its population is 109 (2022).
