= Geriş, Yığılca =

Village in Turkey

Geriş
- Village
- Country: Turkey
- Province: Düzce
- District: Yığılca
- Population (2022): 226
- Time zone: UTC+3 (TRT)

Geriş is a village in the Yığılca District of Düzce Province in Turkey. Its population is 226 (2022).
