= Sekli, Beypazarı =

Sekli
- Neighbourhood
- Location in Turkey Sekli (Turkey Central Anatolia)
- Coordinates: 40°12′N 31°43′E
- Country: Turkey
- Province: Ankara
- District: Beypazarı
- Population (2022): 243
- Time zone: UTC+3 (TRT)

Sekli is a neighbourhood in the municipality and district of Beypazarı, Ankara Province, Turkey. Its population is 243 (2022).
