= Gaziler, Yığılca =

Village in Turkey

Gaziler
- Village
- Location in Turkey
- Coordinates: 40°59′07″N 31°33′11″E
- Country: Turkey
- Province: Düzce
- District: Yığılca
- Population (2022): 116
- Time zone: UTC+3 (TRT)

Gaziler is a village in the Yığılca District of Düzce Province in Turkey. Its population is 116 (2022).
