= Dibecik, Beypazarı =

Dibecik
- Neighbourhood
- Location in Turkey Dibecik (Turkey Central Anatolia)
- Coordinates: 40.1051°N 32.0671°E
- Country: Turkey
- Province: Ankara
- District: Beypazarı
- Population (2022): 146
- Time zone: UTC+3 (TRT)

Dibecik is a neighbourhood in the municipality and district of Beypazarı, Ankara Province, Turkey. Its population is 146 (2022).
