= Orhangazi, Yığılca =

Village in Turkey

Orhangazi
- Village
- Country: Turkey
- Province: Düzce
- District: Yığılca
- Population (2022): 79
- Time zone: UTC+3 (TRT)

Orhangazi is a Turkish village in the Yığılca District of Düzce Province. Its population was 79 in 2022.
