= Kızılcasöğüt, Beypazarı =

Kızılcasöğüt
- Neighbourhood
- Location in Turkey Kızılcasöğüt (Turkey Central Anatolia)
- Coordinates: 40.1936°N 32.0265°E
- Country: Turkey
- Province: Ankara
- District: Beypazarı
- Population (2022): 255
- Time zone: UTC+3 (TRT)

Kızılcasöğüt is a neighbourhood in the municipality and district of Beypazarı, Ankara Province, Turkey. Its population is 255 (2022).
