= Tuzluca, Çat =

Village in Turkey

Tuzluca
- Neighbourhood
- Location in Turkey
- Coordinates: 39°37′05″N 40°57′20″E
- Country: Turkey
- Province: Erzurum
- District: Çat
- Population (2022): 487
- Time zone: UTC+3 (TRT)

Tuzluca is a neighbourhood in the municipality and district of Çat, Erzurum Province in Turkey. Its population is 487 (2022).
