= Yavı, Çat =

Village in Turkey

Yavı
- Neighbourhood
- Location in Turkey
- Coordinates: 39°38′46″N 40°48′27″E
- Country: Turkey
- Province: Erzurum
- District: Çat
- Population (2022): 868
- Time zone: UTC+3 (TRT)

Yavı is a neighbourhood in the municipality and district of Çat, Erzurum Province in Turkey. Its population is 868 (2022).

== History ==
In 1835, Yavi was part of the Tercan District. Its male population at the time was 214 Muslims and 3 non-Muslims, for a total population of 217 males.
