= Çavlı, Savaştepe =

Village in Turkey

Çavlı
- Neighbourhood
- Location in Turkey Çavlı (Marmara)
- Coordinates: 39.534°N 27.636°E
- Country: Turkey
- Province: Balıkesir
- District: Savaştepe
- Population (2022): 91
- Time zone: UTC+3 (TRT)

Çavlı is a neighbourhood in the municipality and district of Savaştepe, Balıkesir Province in Turkey. Its population is 91 (2022).
