= Bağlıca, Çat =

Village in Turkey

Bağlıca
- Neighbourhood
- Location in Turkey
- Coordinates: 39.580°N 40.776°E
- Country: Turkey
- Province: Erzurum
- District: Çat
- Population (2022): 96
- Time zone: UTC+3 (TRT)

Bağlıca is a neighbourhood in the municipality and district of Çat, Erzurum Province in Turkey. Its population is 96 (2022).
