= Yağcılar, Yığılca =

Village in Turkey

Yağcılar
- Village
- Location in Turkey
- Coordinates: 40°57′40″N 31°28′48″E
- Country: Turkey
- Province: Düzce
- District: Yığılca
- Population (2022): 279
- Time zone: UTC+3 (TRT)

Yağcılar is a village in the Yığılca District of Düzce Province in Turkey. Its population is 279 (2022).
