= Yıldız, Beypazarı =

Yıldız
- Neighbourhood
- Location in Turkey Yıldız (Turkey Central Anatolia)
- Coordinates: 40.2772°N 31.7556°E
- Country: Turkey
- Province: Ankara
- District: Beypazarı
- Population (2022): 61
- Time zone: UTC+3 (TRT)

Yıldız is a neighbourhood in the municipality and district of Beypazarı, Ankara Province, Turkey. Its population is 61 (2022).
