= Akpınar, Savaştepe =

Village in Turkey

Akpınar
- Neighbourhood
- Location in Turkey Akpınar (Marmara)
- Coordinates: 39°27′45″N 27°38′00″E
- Country: Turkey
- Province: Balıkesir
- District: Savaştepe
- Population (2022): 125
- Time zone: UTC+3 (TRT)

Akpınar is a neighbourhood in the municipality and district of Savaştepe, Balıkesir Province in Turkey. Its population is 125 (2022).
