= Sarısüleymanlar, Savaştepe =

Village in Turkey

Sarısüleymanlar
- Neighbourhood
- Location in Turkey Sarısüleymanlar (Marmara)
- Coordinates: 39°28′N 27°42′E
- Country: Turkey
- Province: Balıkesir
- District: Savaştepe
- Population (2022): 242
- Time zone: UTC+3 (TRT)

Sarısüleymanlar is a neighbourhood in the municipality and district of Savaştepe, Balıkesir Province in Turkey. Its population is 242 (2022).
