= Yeniyer, Yığılca =

Village in Turkey

Yeniyer
- Village
- Location in Turkey
- Coordinates: 41°00′N 31°22′E
- Country: Turkey
- Province: Düzce
- District: Yığılca
- Population (2022): 257
- Time zone: UTC+3 (TRT)

Yeniyer is a village in the Yığılca District of Düzce Province in Turkey. Its population is 257 (2022).
