= Yazören, Savaştepe =

Village in Turkey

Yazören
- Neighbourhood
- Location in Turkey Yazören (Marmara)
- Coordinates: 39°20′N 27°49′E
- Country: Turkey
- Province: Balıkesir
- District: Savaştepe
- Population (2022): 121
- Time zone: UTC+3 (TRT)

Yazören is a neighbourhood in the municipality and district of Savaştepe, Balıkesir Province in Turkey. Its population is 121 (2022).
