= Sarıkaşık, Çat =

Village in Turkey

Sarıkaşık
- Neighbourhood
- Location in Turkey
- Coordinates: 39°29′N 40°50′E
- Country: Turkey
- Province: Erzurum
- District: Çat
- Population (2022): 397
- Time zone: UTC+3 (TRT)

Sarıkaşık is a neighbourhood in the municipality and district of Çat, Erzurum Province in Turkey. Its population is 397 (2022).
