= Kırbaşı, Beypazarı =

Kırbaşı
- Neighbourhood
- Location in Turkey Kırbaşı (Turkey Central Anatolia)
- Coordinates: 40.0138°N 31.8320°E
- Country: Turkey
- Province: Ankara
- District: Beypazarı
- Population (2022): 618
- Time zone: UTC+3 (TRT)

Kırbaşı is a neighbourhood of the municipality and district of Beypazarı, Ankara Province, Turkey. Its population is 618 (2022). Before the 2013 reorganisation, it was a town (belde).
