= Dikmen, Beypazarı =

Dikmen
- Neighbourhood
- Location in Turkey Dikmen (Turkey Central Anatolia)
- Coordinates: 40.0667°N 32.0167°E
- Country: Turkey
- Province: Ankara
- District: Beypazarı
- Population (2022): 201
- Time zone: UTC+3 (TRT)

Dikmen is a neighbourhood in the municipality and district of Beypazarı, Ankara Province, Turkey. Its population is 201 (2022).
