= Yalnızçam, Beypazarı =

Yalnızçam
- Neighbourhood
- Location in Turkey Yalnızçam (Turkey Central Anatolia)
- Coordinates: 39.9425°N 31.7610°E
- Country: Turkey
- Province: Ankara
- District: Beypazarı
- Population (2022): 85
- Time zone: UTC+3 (TRT)

Yalnızçam is a neighbourhood in the municipality and district of Beypazarı, Ankara Province, Turkey. Its population is 85 (2022).
