= Çamlı, Yığılca =

Village in Turkey

Çamlı
- Village
- Location in Turkey
- Coordinates: 40.9775°N 31.3005°E
- Country: Turkey
- Province: Düzce
- District: Yığılca
- Population (2022): 421
- Time zone: UTC+3 (TRT)

Çamlı is a village in the Yığılca District of Düzce Province in Turkey. Its population is 421 (2022).
