= Kozalan, Beypazarı =

Kozalan
- Neighbourhood
- Location in Turkey Kozalan (Turkey Central Anatolia)
- Coordinates: 40.2358°N 31.9280°E
- Country: Turkey
- Province: Ankara
- District: Beypazarı
- Population (2022): 142
- Time zone: UTC+3 (TRT)

Kozalan is a neighbourhood in the municipality and district of Beypazarı, Ankara Province, Turkey. Its population is 142 (2022).
