= Hocaköy, Yığılca =

Village in Turkey

Hocaköy
- Village
- Location in Turkey
- Coordinates: 41.003°N 31.594°E
- Country: Turkey
- Province: Düzce
- District: Yığılca
- Population (2022): 311
- Time zone: UTC+3 (TRT)

Hocaköy is a village in the Yığılca District of Düzce Province in Turkey. Its population is 311 (2022).
