= Geyikpınarı, Beypazarı =

Geyikpınarı
- Neighbourhood
- Location in Turkey Geyikpınarı (Turkey Central Anatolia)
- Coordinates: 40.2256°N 31.9013°E
- Country: Turkey
- Province: Ankara
- District: Beypazarı
- Population (2022): 28
- Time zone: UTC+3 (TRT)

Geyikpınarı is a neighbourhood in the municipality and district of Beypazarı, Ankara Province, Turkey. Its population is 28 (2022).
