= Gelenöz, Yığılca =

Village in Turkey

Gelenöz
- Village
- Location in Turkey
- Coordinates: 40°56′3″N 31°20′26″E
- Country: Turkey
- Province: Düzce
- District: Yığılca
- Population (2022): 170
- Time zone: UTC+3 (TRT)

Gelenöz is a village in the Yığılca District of Düzce Province in Turkey. Its population is 170 (2022).
