= Gökçeşeyh, Çat =

Village in Turkey

Gökçeşeyh
- Neighbourhood
- Location in Turkey
- Coordinates: 39°37′03″N 40°46′40″E
- Country: Turkey
- Province: Erzurum
- District: Çat
- Population (2022): 196
- Time zone: UTC+3 (TRT)

Gökçeşeyh is a neighbourhood in the municipality and district of Çat, Erzurum Province in Turkey. Its population is 196 (2022).
