= Kaplan, Beypazarı =

Kaplan
- Neighbourhood
- Location in Turkey Kaplan (Turkey Central Anatolia)
- Coordinates: 40.2241°N 31.8101°E
- Country: Turkey
- Province: Ankara
- District: Beypazarı
- Population (2022): 46
- Time zone: UTC+3 (TRT)

Kaplan is a neighbourhood in the municipality and district of Beypazarı, Ankara Province, Turkey. Its population is 46 (2022).
