= Bozalan, Savaştepe =

Village in Turkey

Bozalan
- Neighbourhood
- Location in Turkey Bozalan (Marmara)
- Coordinates: 39°28′46″N 27°40′35″E
- Country: Turkey
- Province: Balıkesir
- District: Savaştepe
- Population (2022): 123
- Time zone: UTC+3 (TRT)

Bozalan is a neighbourhood in the municipality and district of Savaştepe, Balıkesir Province in Turkey. Its population is 123 (2022).
