= Kocabıyıklar, Savaştepe =

Village in Turkey

Kocabıyıklar
- Neighbourhood
- Location in Turkey Kocabıyıklar (Marmara)
- Coordinates: 39°27′04″N 27°40′08″E
- Country: Turkey
- Province: Balıkesir
- District: Savaştepe
- Population (2022): 94
- Time zone: UTC+3 (TRT)

Kocabıyıklar is a neighbourhood in the municipality and district of Savaştepe, Balıkesir Province in Turkey. Its population is 94 (2022).
