= Karaşar, Beypazarı =

Karaşar
- Neighbourhood
- Location in Turkey Karaşar (Turkey Central Anatolia)
- Coordinates: 40.3257°N 31.9868°E
- Country: Turkey
- Province: Ankara
- District: Beypazarı
- Population (2022): 429
- Time zone: UTC+3 (TRT)

Karaşar is a neighbourhood of the municipality and district of Beypazarı, Ankara Province, Turkey. Its population is 429 (2022). Before the 2013 reorganisation, it was a town (belde).
