= Söğütçük, Savaştepe =

Village in Turkey

Söğütçük
- Neighbourhood
- Location in Turkey Söğütçük (Marmara)
- Coordinates: 39.503°N 27.697°E
- Country: Turkey
- Province: Balıkesir
- District: Savaştepe
- Population (2022): 282
- Time zone: UTC+3 (TRT)

Söğütçük is a neighbourhood in the municipality and district of Savaştepe, Balıkesir Province in Turkey. Its population is 282 (2022).
