= Doğançalı, Beypazarı =

Doğançalı
- Neighbourhood
- Location in Turkey Doğançalı (Turkey Central Anatolia)
- Coordinates: 40.2927°N 32.1041°E
- Country: Turkey
- Province: Ankara
- District: Beypazarı
- Population (2022): 36
- Time zone: UTC+3 (TRT)

Doğançalı is a neighbourhood in the municipality and district of Beypazarı, Ankara Province, Turkey. Its population is 36 (2022).
