= Mecidiye, Savaştepe =

Village in Turkey

Mecidiye
- Neighbourhood
- Location in Turkey Mecidiye (Marmara)
- Coordinates: 39.478°N 27.656°E
- Country: Turkey
- Province: Balıkesir
- District: Savaştepe
- Population (2022): 147
- Time zone: UTC+3 (TRT)

Mecidiye is a neighbourhood in the municipality and district of Savaştepe, Balıkesir Province in Turkey. Its population is 147 (2022).
