= Madenmezarı, Savaştepe =

Village in Turkey

Madenmezarı
- Neighbourhood
- Location in Turkey Madenmezarı (Marmara)
- Coordinates: 39°26′10″N 27°32′29″E
- Country: Turkey
- Province: Balıkesir
- District: Savaştepe
- Population (2022): 133
- Time zone: UTC+3 (TRT)

Madenmezarı is a neighbourhood in the municipality and district of Savaştepe, Balıkesir Province in Turkey. Its population is 133 (2022).
