= Akçalı, Beypazarı =

Akçalı
- Neighbourhood
- Location in Turkey Akçalı (Turkey Central Anatolia)
- Coordinates: 40.2760°N 31.9049°E
- Country: Turkey
- Province: Ankara
- District: Beypazarı
- Population (2022): 30
- Time zone: UTC+3 (TRT)

Akçalı is a neighbourhood in the municipality and district of Beypazarı, Ankara Province, Turkey. Its population is 30 (2022).
