= Aşağıçatköy, Çat =

Village in Turkey

Aşağıçatköy
- Neighbourhood
- Location in Turkey
- Coordinates: 39°39′N 41°01′E
- Country: Turkey
- Province: Erzurum
- District: Çat
- Population (2022): 208
- Time zone: UTC+3 (TRT)

Aşağıçatköy is a neighbourhood in the municipality and district of Çat, Erzurum Province in Turkey. Its population is 208 (2022).
