= Kapullu, Beypazarı =

Kapullu
- Neighbourhood
- Location in Turkey Kapullu (Turkey Central Anatolia)
- Coordinates: 39.9072°N 31.8243°E
- Country: Turkey
- Province: Ankara
- District: Beypazarı
- Population (2022): 163
- Time zone: UTC+3 (TRT)

Kapullu is a neighbourhood in the municipality and district of Beypazarı, Ankara Province, Turkey. Its population is 163 (2022).
