= Kurtkovan, Beypazarı =

Kurtkovan
- Neighbourhood
- Location in Turkey Kurtkovan (Turkey Central Anatolia)
- Coordinates: 40°16′N 31°53′E
- Country: Turkey
- Province: Ankara
- District: Beypazarı
- Population (2022): 19
- Time zone: UTC+3 (TRT)

Kurtkovan is a neighbourhood in the municipality and district of Beypazarı, Ankara Province, Turkey. Its population is 19 (2022).
