= Elmapınar, Çat =

Village in Turkey

Elmapınar
- Neighbourhood
- Country: Turkey
- Province: Erzurum
- District: Çat
- Population (2022): 108
- Time zone: UTC+3 (TRT)

Elmapınar is a neighbourhood in the municipality and district of Çat, Erzurum Province in Turkey. Its population is 108 (2022).
