= Muratçayırı, Çat =

Village in Turkey

Muratçayırı
- Neighbourhood
- Country: Turkey
- Province: Erzurum
- District: Çat
- Population (2022): 142
- Time zone: UTC+3 (TRT)

Muratçayırı is a neighbourhood in the municipality and district of Çat, Erzurum Province in Turkey. Its population is 142 (2022).
