= Soğukpınar, Düzce =

Village in Turkey

Soğukpınar
- Neighbourhood
- Country: Turkey
- Province: Düzce
- District: Düzce
- Municipality: Düzce
- Population (2022): 841
- Time zone: UTC+3 (TRT)

Soğukpınar is a neighbourhood of the city Düzce, Düzce District, Düzce Province, Turkey. Its population is 841 (2022).
