= Köseler, Yığılca =

Village in Turkey

Köseler
- Village
- Country: Turkey
- Province: Düzce
- District: Yığılca
- Population (2022): 115
- Time zone: UTC+3 (TRT)

Köseler is a village in the Yığılca District of Düzce Province in Turkey. The village's population in 2022 is 115.
