= Turgut Kabaca =

Turkish water polo player

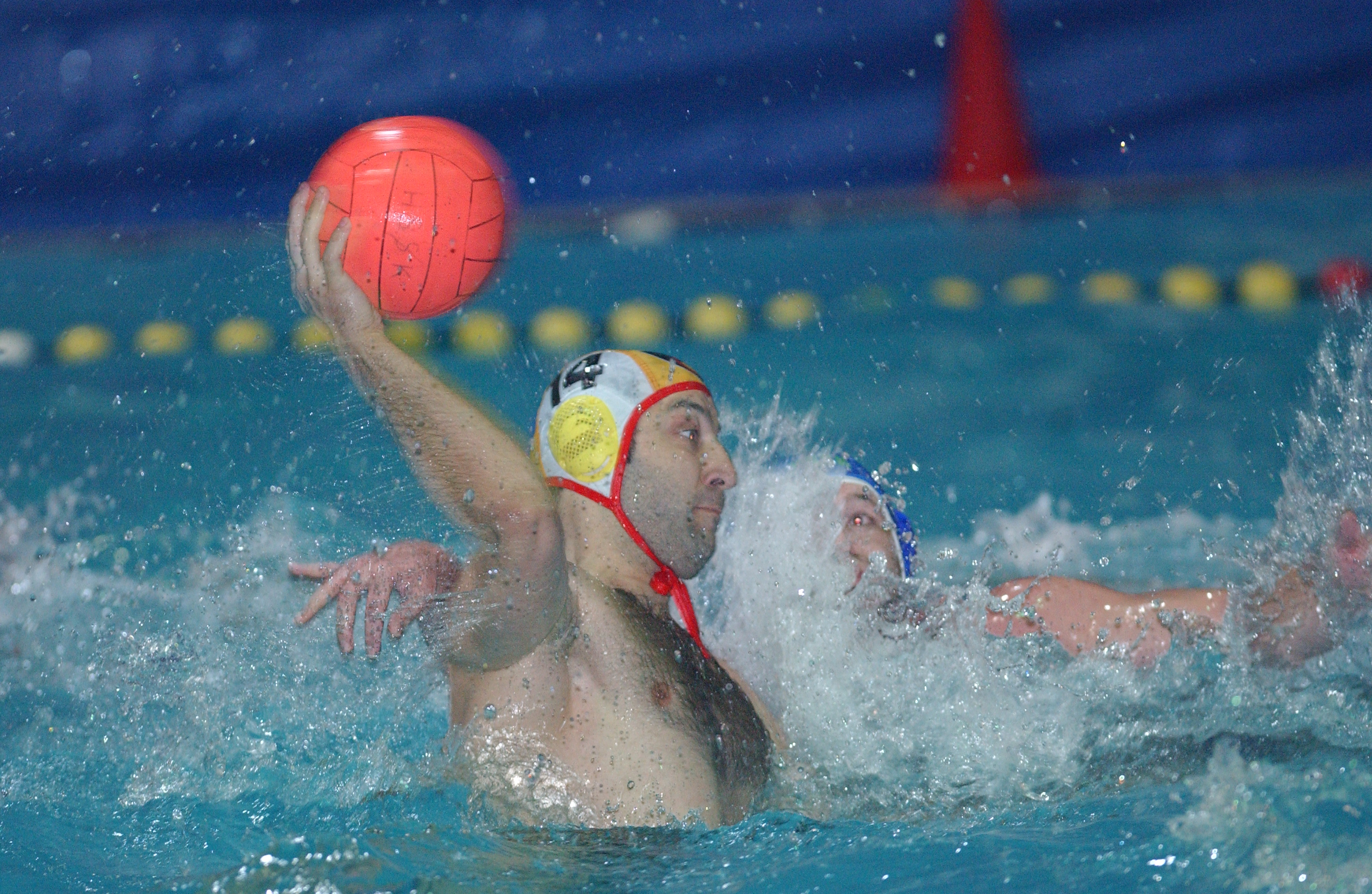

Personal information
- Full name: Turgut Kabaca
- Born: August 10, 1972 (age 53) Istanbul, Turkey

Sport
- Country: Turkey

Turgut Kabaca (born August 10, 1972) is a civil engineer, swimmer, and national water polo player.

== Career ==
- 1979–1985 Galatasaray Swimming Team
- 1986–2005 Galatasaray Water Polo Team (1993–2002 Captain of Senior Team; 1991, 1993, 1994, 1995, 1996, 1997, 1999, 2000, 2001, 2005, 10 times Senior Team Turkish Champion)
- 1988–1992 Junior National Team Player
- 1990–2002 Senior National Team Player
- 2005–2008 Board Member of the Turkish Water Polo Federation, Manager of National Teams
- 2008–2009 ODTÜ Sutopu Takımı (1.lig)
- 2008–2009 METU Water Polo Team (1st league)
- 2010–2014 Antalyaspor Water Polo Team (3rd league champion, 2nd league champion, and 1st league)
- 2013 Galatasaray 35+ Masters Team (European Masters Water Polo Championship – Budapest, silver medal)
- 2014–2015 Manisa Metyx Water Polo Team (1st league)
