= Bağözü, Beypazarı =

Bağözü
- Neighbourhood
- Location in Turkey Bağözü (Turkey Central Anatolia)
- Coordinates: 40.1824°N 31.8512°E
- Country: Turkey
- Province: Ankara
- District: Beypazarı
- Population (2022): 77
- Time zone: UTC+3 (TRT)

Bağözü is a neighbourhood in the municipality and district of Beypazarı, Ankara Province, Turkey. Its population is 77 (2022).
