= Kabaca, Beypazarı =

Kabaca
- Neighbourhood
- Location in Turkey Kabaca (Turkey Central Anatolia)
- Coordinates: 40.2568°N 32.0479°E
- Country: Turkey
- Province: Ankara
- District: Beypazarı
- Population (2022): 108
- Time zone: UTC+3 (TRT)

Kabaca is a neighbourhood in the municipality and district of Beypazarı, Ankara Province, Turkey. Its population is 108 (2022).
