= Kayabükü, Beypazarı =

Kayabükü
- Neighbourhood
- Location in Turkey Kayabükü (Turkey Central Anatolia)
- Coordinates: 40.0838°N 31.8357°E
- Country: Turkey
- Province: Ankara
- District: Beypazarı
- Population (2022): 162
- Time zone: UTC+3 (TRT)

Kayabükü is a neighbourhood in the municipality and district of Beypazarı, Ankara Province, Turkey. Its population is 162 (2022).
