= Mumbar =

- Location within Pakistan
- Coordinates: 32.59°N 73.49°E
- Country: Pakistan
- Province: Punjab
- Elevation: 229 m (751 ft)
- Time zone: UTC+5 (PST)

Mumbar is a village of Mandi Bahauddin District in the Punjab province of Pakistan. It is located at 32°59'10N 73°49'10E with an altitude of 229 metres (754 feet).
