= Yoğunpelit, Beypazarı =

Yoğunpelit
- Neighbourhood
- Location in Turkey Yoğunpelit (Turkey Central Anatolia)
- Coordinates: 40.2189°N 32.0494°E
- Country: Turkey
- Province: Ankara
- District: Beypazarı
- Elevation: 770 m (2,530 ft)
- Population (2022): 235
- Time zone: UTC+3 (TRT)

Yoğunpelit is a neighbourhood in the municipality and district of Beypazarı, Ankara Province, Turkey. Its population is 235 (2022).
