= Macun, Beypazarı =

Macun
- Neighbourhood
- Location in Turkey Macun (Turkey Central Anatolia)
- Coordinates: 40.2210°N 32.0031°E
- Country: Turkey
- Province: Ankara
- District: Beypazarı
- Population (2022): 265
- Time zone: UTC+3 (TRT)

Macun is a neighbourhood in the municipality and district of Beypazarı, Ankara Province, Turkey. Its population is 265 (2022).
