= Mengen, Yığılca =

Village in Turkey

Mengen
- Village
- Country: Turkey
- Province: Düzce
- District: Yığılca
- Population (2022): 107
- Time zone: UTC+3 (TRT)

Mengen is a village in the Yığılca District of Düzce Province in Turkey. The village had a population of 107 in 2022.
