= Köseler, Beypazarı =

Köseler
- Neighbourhood
- Location in Turkey Köseler (Turkey Central Anatolia)
- Coordinates: 40.3197°N 31.9939°E
- Country: Turkey
- Province: Ankara
- District: Beypazarı
- Population (2022): 36
- Time zone: UTC+3 (TRT)

Köseler is a neighbourhood in the municipality and district of Beypazarı, Ankara Province, Turkey. Its population is 36 (2022).
