= Kurbanlı, Çat =

Village in Turkey

Kurbanlı
- Neighbourhood
- Location in Turkey
- Coordinates: 39°31′29″N 40°47′32″E
- Country: Turkey
- Province: Erzurum
- District: Çat
- Population (2022): 287
- Time zone: UTC+3 (TRT)

Kurbanlı is a neighbourhood in the municipality and district of Çat, Erzurum Province in Turkey. Its population is 287 (2022).
