= Çukurçayır, Savaştepe =

Village in Turkey

Çukurçayır
- Neighbourhood
- Location in Turkey Çukurçayır (Marmara)
- Coordinates: 39.394°N 27.552°E
- Country: Turkey
- Province: Balıkesir
- District: Savaştepe
- Population (2022): 78
- Time zone: UTC+3 (TRT)

Çukurçayır is a neighbourhood in the municipality and district of Savaştepe, Balıkesir Province in Turkey. Its population is 78 (2022).
