= Acısu, Beypazarı =

Acısu
- Neighbourhood
- Location in Turkey Acısu (Turkey Central Anatolia)
- Coordinates: 40.1652°N 31.9914°E
- Country: Turkey
- Province: Ankara
- District: Beypazarı
- Population (2022): 61
- Time zone: UTC+3 (TRT)

Acısu is a neighbourhood in the municipality and district of Beypazarı, Ankara Province, Turkey. Its population is 61 (2022).
