= Soğukpınar, Çat =

Village in Turkey

Soğukpınar
- Neighbourhood
- Location in Turkey
- Coordinates: 39.555°N 41.001°E
- Country: Turkey
- Province: Erzurum
- District: Çat
- Population (2022): 742
- Time zone: UTC+3 (TRT)

Soğukpınar is a neighbourhood in the municipality and district of Çat, Erzurum Province in Turkey. Its population is 742 (2022).
