= Adaören, Beypazarı =

Adaören
- Neighbourhood
- Location in Turkey Adaören (Turkey Central Anatolia)
- Coordinates: 40°09′N 32°06′E
- Country: Turkey
- Province: Ankara
- District: Beypazarı
- Population (2022): 174
- Time zone: UTC+3 (TRT)

Adaören is a neighbourhood in the municipality and district of Beypazarı, Ankara Province, Turkey. Its population is 174 (2022).
