= Yoğunpelit, Yığılca =

Village in Turkey

Yoğunpelit
- Village
- Location in Turkey
- Coordinates: 40.9661°N 31.6108°E
- Country: Turkey
- Province: Düzce
- District: Yığılca
- Population (2022): 274
- Time zone: UTC+3 (TRT)

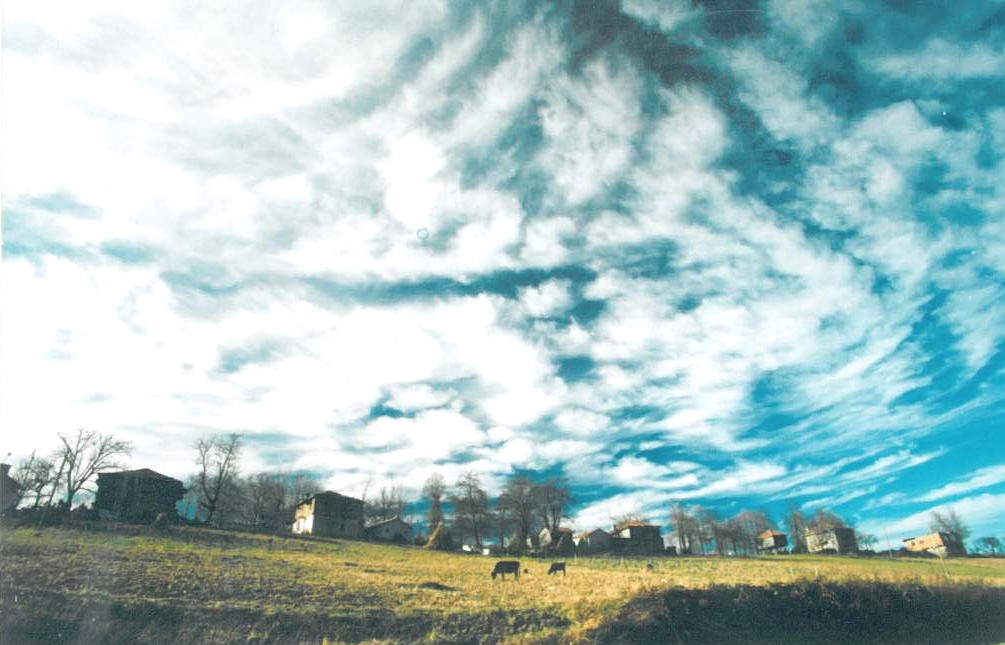

Yoğunpelit is a village in the Yığılca District of Düzce Province in Turkey. Its population is 274 (2022).
