= Haydarlar, Beypazarı =

Haydarlar
- Neighbourhood
- Location in Turkey Haydarlar (Turkey Central Anatolia)
- Coordinates: 40.2775°N 31.9349°E
- Country: Turkey
- Province: Ankara
- District: Beypazarı
- Population (2022): 28
- Time zone: UTC+3 (TRT)

Haydarlar is a neighbourhood in the municipality and district of Beypazarı, Ankara Province, Turkey. Its population is 28 (2022).
