= Kurbanlı, Tarsus =

Kurbanlı
- Neighbourhood
- Location in Turkey
- Coordinates: 37°02′24″N 34°54′49″E
- Country: Turkey
- Province: Mersin
- District: Tarsus
- Elevation: 192 m (630 ft)
- Population (2022): 140
- Time zone: UTC+3 (TRT)
- Area code: 0324

Kurbanlı is a neighbourhood in the Tarsus district of Mersin Province, Turkey. Its population is 140 (2022). It is situated in the southern slopes of the Toros Mountains and to the west of Turkish state highway D.400. It is 15 kilometres (9.3 mi) away from Tarsus and 37 kilometres (23 mi) away from Mersin.
