= Yığılca =

- Municipality
- Location within Turkey
- Coordinates: 40°58′N 31°27′E
- Country: Turkey
- Province: Düzce
- District: Yığılca

Government
  - Mayor: Rasim Çam (MHP)
- Population (2022): 3,024
- Time zone: UTC+3 (TRT)
- Area code: 0380
- Climate: Cfb
- Website: www.yigilca.bel.tr

Yığılca is a town in Düzce Province in the Black Sea region of Turkey. It is the seat of Yığılca District. Its population is 3,024 (2022). The mayor is Rasim Çam (MHP), elected in 2019.
