= List of populated places in Düzce Province =

Places in Turkey

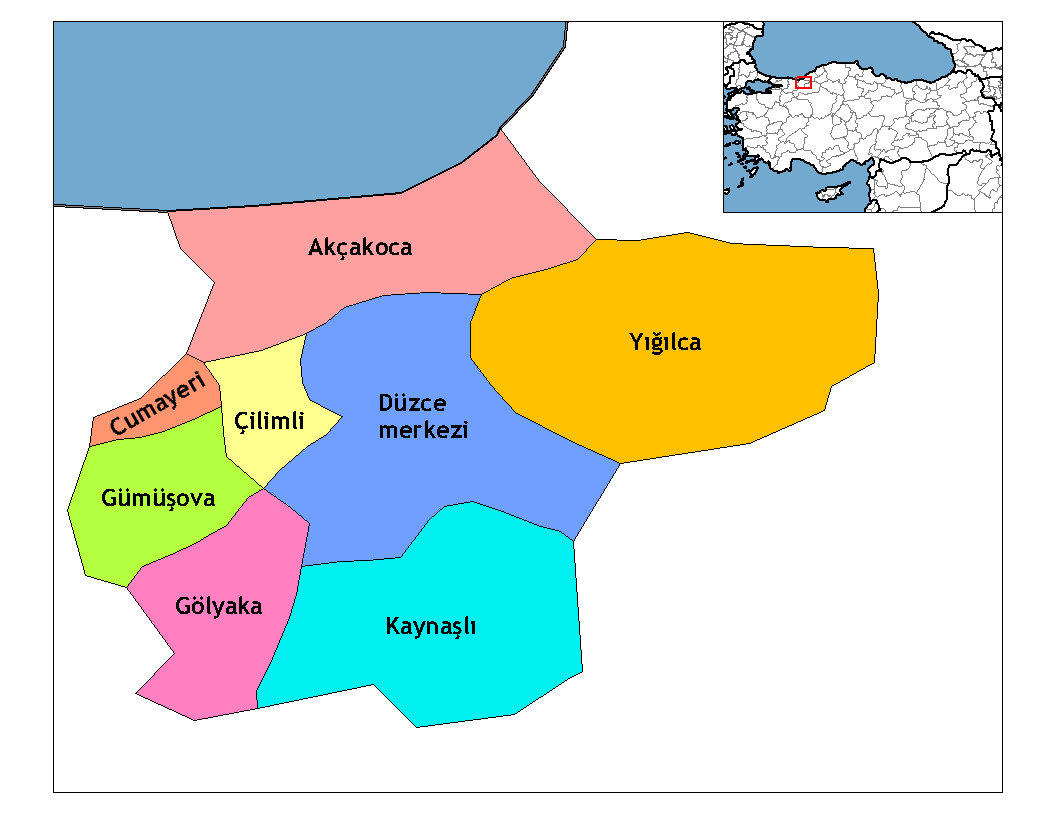
Düzce Province

Below is the list of populated places in Düzce Province, Turkey by the districts.

== Düzce (Merkez) ==
- Beyköy
- Boğaziçi
- Düzce
- Akbıyıklar
- Aktarla
- Akyazı
- Altınpınar
- Asar
- Aybaşı
- Aydınpınar
- Aynalı
- Bahçeköy
- Ballıca
- Bataklıçiftlik
- Bostanlık
- Büyükaçma
- Çakırhacıibrahim
- Çalıcuma
- Çamlısu
- Çınardüzü
- Çınarlı
- Çiftlikköy
- Dağdibi
- Derdin
- Develi Besni
- Doğanlı
- Duraklar
- Düverdüzü
- Düzköy
- Eminaçma
- Erdemli
- Esençam
- Esentepe
- Eski Mengencik
- Fındıklıaksu
- Gökçe
- Gölormanı
- Güldere
- Gümüşpınar
- Günbaşı
- Gündolaması
- Güven
- Hacıahmetler
- Hacıaliler
- Hasanlar
- Hatipliketenciler
- Hocaoğlu
- İhsaniye
- İslahiye
- İstilli
- Kabalak
- Kadıoğlu
- Kaledibi
- Karadere
- Kavakbıçkı
- Kaymakçı
- Kemerkasım
- Kirazlı
- Kızılcık
- Konaklı
- Köprübaşı
- Kozluk
- Küçükahmet
- Küçükmehmet
- Kurtsuyu
- Kuşaçması
- Kutlu
- Mamure
- Muncurlu
- Muradiyemengencik
- Musababa
- Nasırlı
- Nuhlar
- Osmanca
- Otluoğlu
- Ovapınar
- Ozanlar
- Özyanık
- Paşakonağı
- Paşaormanı
- Pınarlar
- Samandere
- Sancakdere
- Şaziye
- Sinirci
- Suncuk
- Taşköprü
- Turaplar
- Üçyol
- Uğur
- Yaka
- Yayakbaşı
- Yayla
- Yeni Aynalı
- Yeni Karaköy
- Yeni Taşköprü
- Yeşilçam
- Yeşilçimen
- Yörük

== Akçakoca ==
- Akçakoca
- Akkaya
- Aktaş
- Altunçay
- Arabacı
- Balatlı
- Beyhanlı
- Beyören
- Çayağzı
- Çiçekpınar
- Dadalı
- Davutağa
- Deredibi
- Dereköy
- Dilaver
- Doğancılar
- Döngelli
- Edilli
- Esmahanım
- Fakıllı
- Göktepe
- Hasançavuş
- Hemşin
- Kalkın
- Karatavuk
- Kepenç
- Kınık
- Kirazlı
- Koçar
- Koçullu
- Küpler
- Kurugöl
- Kurukavak
- Melenağzı
- Nazımbey
- Ortanca
- Paşalar
- Sarıyayla
- Subaşı
- Tahirli
- Tepeköy
- Uğurlu
- Yenice
- Yeşilköy

== Çilimli ==
- Çilimli
- Alacamescit
- Bıçkıbaşı
- Çalılık
- Dikmeli
- Döngelli
- Esenli
- Hızardere
- İshaklar
- Kafyayla
- Karaçörtlen
- Kırkharman
- Kiraztarla
- Kuşoğlu
- Pırpır
- Sarımeşe
- Söğütlü
- Tepeköy
- Yeniköy
- Yenivakıf
- Yukarıkaraköy

== Cumayeri ==
- Cumayeri
- Akpınar
- Avlayan
- Büyükmelen
- Çamlıpınar
- Çelikdere
- Dokuzdeğirmen
- Esentepe
- Hamascık
- Harmankaya
- Iğdır
- Kızılüzüm
- Mısırlık
- Ordulukaradere
- Ören
- Sırtpınar
- Subaşı
- Taşlık
- Üvezbeli
- Yenitepe
- Yeşiltepe
- Yukarıavlayan

== Gölyaka ==
- Gölyaka
- Açma
- Aksu
- Bakacak
- Bekiroğlu
- Çamlıbel
- Çayköy
- Değirmentepe
- Güzeldere
- Hacısüleymanbey
- Hacıyakup
- Hamamüstü
- İçmeler
- Kemeryanı
- Muhapdede
- Saçmalıpınar
- Sarıdere
- Taşlık
- Yazlık
- Yeşilova
- Yunusefendi
- Zekeriyaköy

== Gümüşova ==
- Gümüşova
- Adaköy
- Ardıçdibi
- Çaybükü
- Dededüzü
- Dereköy
- Elmacık
- Hacıkadirler
- Halilbey
- Kahveleryanı
- Kıyıköy
- Pazarcık
- Selamlar
- Soğuksu
- Sultaniye
- Yakabaşı
- Yeşilyayla
- Yıldıztepe
- Yongalık

== Kaynaşlı ==
- Kaynaşlı
- Altunköy
- Bıçkıyanı
- Çakırsayvan
- Çamlıca
- Çamoluk
- Çatalçam
- Darıyeri Bakacak
- Darıyeri Hasanbey
- Darıyeri Mengencik
- Darıyeri Yörükler
- Dipsizgöl
- Fındıklı
- Hacıazizler
- Muratbey
- Sarıçökek
- Sazköy
- Tavak
- Üçköprü
- Yeniyurt
- Yeşiltepe

== Yığılca ==
- Yığılca
- Akçaören
- Aksaklar
- Asar
- Aydınyayla
- Bekirler
- Çamlı
- Çiftlikköy
- Çukurören
- Dibektaş
- Doğanlar
- Dutlar
- Gaziler
- Gelenöz
- Geriş
- Gökçeağaç
- Güney
- Hacılar
- Hacıyeri
- Hebeler
- Hocaköy
- Hocatman
- Hoşafoğlu
- İğneler
- Karakaş
- Kırık
- Kocaoğlu
- Köseler
- Mengen
- Naşlar
- Orhangazi
- Redifler
- Sarıkaya
- Tıraşlar
- Tuğrul
- Yağcılar
- Yaylatepe
- Yeniyer
- Yılgı
- Yoğunpelit
