= Asar =

Asar may refer to:

- Asr prayer, one of the five daily prayers in Islam
- Asar, Iran, a village in Iran
- Asar, Düzce
- Asar, Ortaköy, a village in Turkey
- Asar, Yığılca
- Asar Party, a former Kazakhstani political party
- Advanced Synthetic Aperture Radar instrument aboard the European Space Agency's Envisat satellite
- Arc Segment Attitude Reference, an on-boresight attitude reference symbol for a helmet-mounted display (HMD)
- A 19th-century transcription of the name Osiris, an Ancient Egyptian deity
- Electron Archive (ASAR) is a simple extensive archive format, that works like tar
- Esker, a glacial landform sometimes called an asar
- Asadha, a month in the Hindu calendar (June–July)
  - Ashadh (Nepali calendar)
