= Samandere =

Samandere can refer to:

- Samandere, Düzce
- Samandere Waterfall
