= Aydınpınar =

Aydınpınar may refer to:

- Aydınpınar, Düzce
- Aydınpınar, Kahta
- Aydınpınar, Mudanya
