= Aktarla =

Aktarla can refer to:

- Aktarla, Düzce
- Aktarla, Merzifon
