= Dağdibi =

Dağdibi can refer to:

- Dağdibi, Düzce
- Dağdibi, Oltu
- Dağdibi, Pozantı
