= Günbaşı =

Günbaşı can refer to:

- Günbaşı, Düzce
- Günbaşı, Kazan
