= Yeniyurt =

Yeniyurt can refer to:

- Yeniyurt Castle, castle ruin in Mersin Province, Turkey
- Yeniyurt, Erdemli, a village in Erdemli district of Mersin Province, Turkey
- Yeniyurt, Kaynaşlı, a village in the Kaynaşlı District of Düzce Province in Turkey
- Yeniyurt, Refahiye
