= Güldere =

Güldere can refer to:

- Güldere, Düzce
- Güldere, Vezirköprü
