= Döngelli =

Döngelli can refer to:

- Döngelli, Akçakoca
- Döngelli, Çilimli
