= Ballıca =

Ballıca is a Turkic place name that may refer to:

- Ballıca, Elâzığ
- Ballıca, Düzce
- Ballıca, Tarsus, a village in the district of Tarsus, Mersin Province, Turkey
- Ballıca, Khojali, a village in Khojali Rayon, Azerbaijan
- Ballıca, Oltu
- Ballıca Cave, a cave in the district of Pazar, Tokat Province, Turkey
