= Söğütlü (disambiguation) =

Söğütlü can refer to the following places in Turkey:

- Söğütlü, a town and district of Sakarya Province
- Söğütlü, Aziziye
- Söğütlü, Ayvacık
- Söğütlü, Bartın
- Söğütlü, Bayburt
- Söğütlü, Çilimli
- Söğütlü, Çukurova
- Söğütlü, Hınıs
- Söğütlü, Kelkit, a town in the district of Kelkit, Gümüşhane Province
- Söğütlü, Midyat
- Söğütlü, Otlukbeli
- Söğütlü, Refahiye
- Söğütlü Athletics Stadium
