= Fevziye =

Fevziye can refer to:

- Fevziye, Düzce
- Fevziye, Gemlik
- Fevziye, İnegöl
