= Çamoluk (disambiguation) =

Çamoluk can refer to:

- Çamoluk
- Çamoluk, Kaynaşlı
- Çamoluk, Sungurlu
