= Kırkharman =

Kırkharman can refer to:

- Kırkharman, Çilimli
- Kırkharman, Taşova
