= Nasirli =

Nasirli is both a given name and a surname. Notable people with the name include:

- Nasirli Muzaffar (1902–1944), Talysh poet
- Ramin Nasirli (born 2002), Azerbaijani footballer

== See also ==
- Nasırlı, Düzce, village in Turkey
