= Sarımeşe =

Sarımeşe can refer to:

- Sarımeşe, Amasya
- Sarımeşe, Bayburt
- Sarımeşe, Çilimli
