= Şaziye =

Şaziye is a Turkish female given name. People named Şaziye include:

== Given name ==
- Şaziye Erdoğan (born 1992), Turkish female weightlifter
- Şaziye İvegin (born 1982), Turkish female basketball player
- Şaziye Moral (1903–1985), Turkish stage, film and voice actress

== See also ==
- Şaziye, Düzce
- Shazia
