= Gümüşpınar =

Gümüşpınar can refer to:

- Gümüşpınar, Devrek
- Gümüşpınar, Düzce
- Gümüşpınar, Kalecik
