= Embolos =

Town in ancient Bithynia

Coordinates: 40°46′21″N 31°10′00″E

Embolos was a town in ancient Bithynia that was inhabited during Roman times.

Its site is located near Beyköy in Asiatic Turkey.
