= Taşlık =

Taşlık (Turkish taş for "stone" followed by the noun forming suffix "-lık" with the meaning "-ness", thus approximately "stoniness" or "stony place") may refer to the following settlements in Turkey:

- Taşlık, Cumayeri
- Taşlık, Gölyaka
- Taşlık, Karacabey
- Taşlık, Kastamonu, village in the District of Kastamonu, Kastamonu Province, Turkey
- Taşlık, Kozluk, a village in the District of Kozluk, Batman Province, Turkey
- Taşlık, Kıbrıscık, a village in the District of Kıbrısçık, Bolu Province, Turkey
