= Altınpınar =

Altınpınar can refer to:

- Altınpınar, Düzce
- Altınpınar, Hınıs
