= Samandere Waterfall =

Samandere Waterfall Samandere Şelalesi
- Location within Turkey
- Location: Düzce Province, Turkey
- Coordinates: 40°41′22″N 31°15′37″E

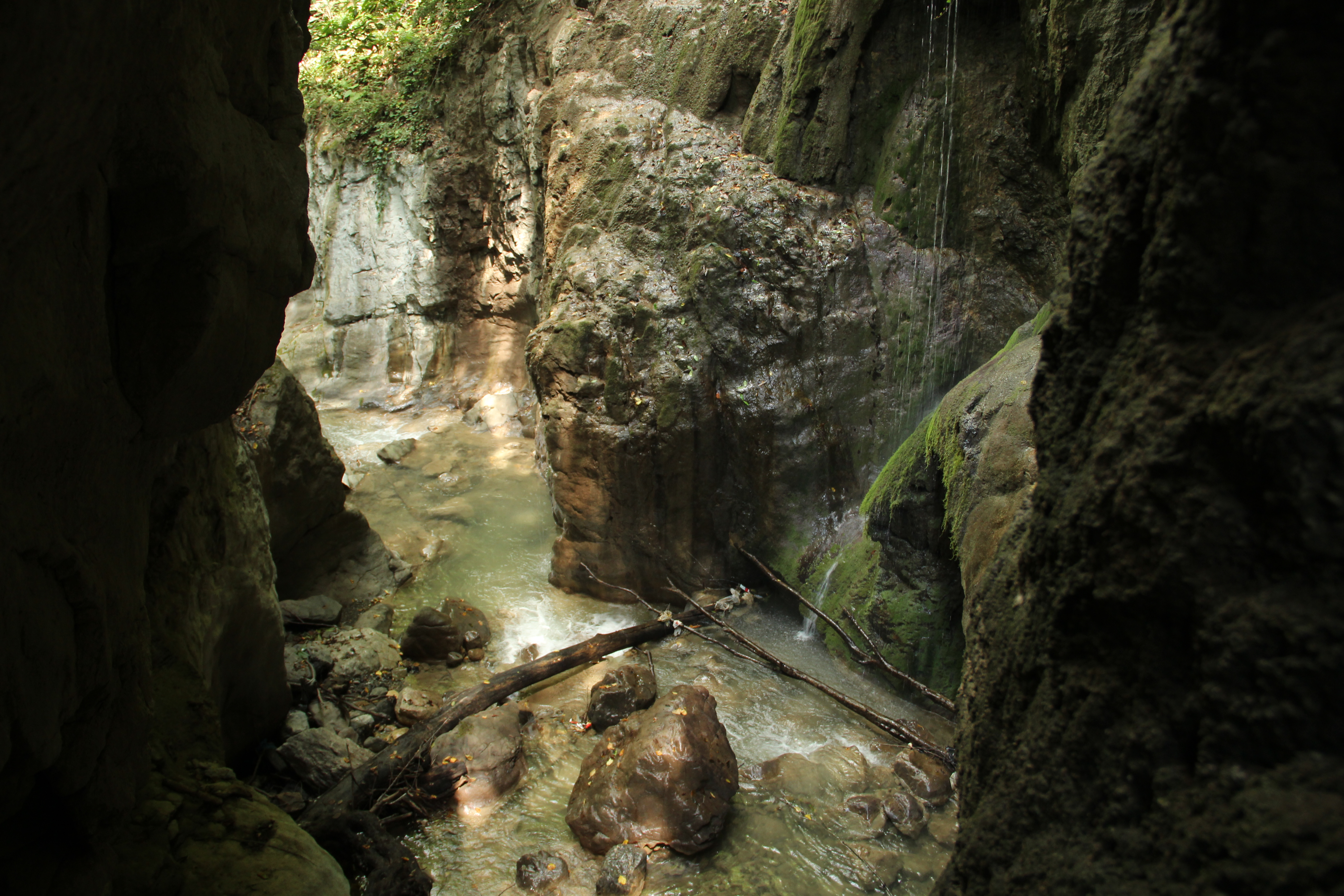
View of Samandere Waterfall in 2013

Samandere Waterfall (Turkish: Samandere Şelalesi) is a waterfall in Düzce Province, northwestern Turkey. It is the first ever registered natural monument of the country.

== Location and access ==
The waterfall is located in Samandere village of Beyköy district, 24 km (15 mi) southeast of Düzce. It is 15 km (9.3 mi) far from Beyköy, 26 km (16 mi) from the state highway D.100 and 20 km (12 mi) from the motorway O.4. The road to the waterfall on a length of 15 km (9.3 mi) was widened and asphalted for easy access in 2015.

In 2016, the municipality of Düzce launched free-of-charge transportation by bus to the waterfall from the city center on daily basis during the summer months.

== Waterfall ==
The waterfall is on a tributary of Uğur Creek, which flows into Lake Efteni. There is a cave in upstream of the waters forming the waterfall, which submerge and outcrop there. The area consists of monumental trees along the 500 m (1,600 ft)-long stream, three waterfalls and a deep canyon called "Cadı Kazanı" (literally: Witches Cauldron). The site is a popular visitor attraction, which offers campsites, picnicking areas and hiking trails for outdoor recreation. The waterfall site features a footbridge and observation decks with railing.

On December 10, 1988, the waterfall and its surroundings covering an area of 109.96 da (11,836 sq ft), was registered by the Nature Reserve and Nature Parks Administration of the Ministry of Forest and Water Management as the first ever natural monument of the country. The natural monument is run by the Municipality of Düzce according to a protocol signed later by the parts.

The waterfall sustained great damage following a flood disaster occurred on July 16–17, 2009. It was restored after maintenance works in 2009 and 2010.

== See also ==
- List of waterfalls
- List of waterfalls in Turkey
