= Kızılcık =

Kızılcık can refer to:

== People ==
- Enes Kızılcık (born 2001), Turkish triathlete

== Places ==
- Kızılcık, Ardanuç
- Kızılcık, Düzce
