= Dokuzdeğirmen =

Dokuzdeğirmen can refer to:

- Dokuzdeğirmen, Cumayeri
- Dokuzdeğirmen, Oltu
