= İshaklar =

İshaklar can refer to:

- İshaklar, Çilimli
- İshaklar, Gülnar
