= Kaledibi =

Kaledibi can refer to:

- Kaledibi, Düzce
- Kaledibi, Hani
- Kaledibi, Olur
