= Hızardere =

Hızardere can refer to:

- Hızardere, Çilimli
- Hızardere, Horasan
