= Esenli, Çilimli =

Village in Turkey

Esenli
- Village
- Country: Turkey
- Province: Düzce
- District: Çilimli
- Population (2022): 649
- Time zone: UTC+3 (TRT)

Esenli is a village in the Çilimli District of Düzce Province in Turkey. Its population is 649 (2022).
