= Bahçeköy, Düzce =

Village in Turkey

Bahçeköy
- Village
- Location in Turkey
- Coordinates: 40.8252°N 31.0813°E
- Country: Turkey
- Province: Düzce
- District: Düzce
- Population (2022): 788
- Time zone: UTC+3 (TRT)

Bahçeköy is a village in the Düzce District of Düzce Province in Turkey. Its population is 788 (2022). Mostly populated by Kurds, the village is located near the Small Melen River and has a lot of grassland, where most of the cattles are brought to in the summer period. Most villagers and people from the nearby Paşakonağı and Yenitaşköprü have cattle farms. The village has a primary school.
