= Akbıyıklar, Düzce =

Village in Turkey

Akbıyıklar
- Village
- Location in Turkey
- Coordinates: 40°52′11″N 31°15′00″E
- Country: Turkey
- Province: Düzce
- District: Düzce
- Population (2022): 299
- Time zone: UTC+3 (TRT)

Akbıyıklar is a village in the Düzce District of Düzce Province in Turkey. Its population is 299 (2022).
