= Selamlar, Gümüşova =

Village in Turkey

Selamlar
- Village
- Location in Turkey
- Coordinates: 40°51′N 30°58′E
- Country: Turkey
- Province: Düzce
- District: Gümüşova
- Population (2022): 781
- Time zone: UTC+3 (TRT)

Selamlar is a village in the Gümüşova District of Düzce Province in Turkey. Its population is 781 (2022).
