= Çamlısu, Düzce =

Village in Turkey

Çamlısu
- Village
- Location in Turkey
- Coordinates: 40°56′N 31°15′E
- Country: Turkey
- Province: Düzce
- District: Düzce
- Population (2022): 179
- Time zone: UTC+3 (TRT)

Çamlısu is a village in the Düzce District of Düzce Province in Turkey. Its population is 179 (2022).
