= Eski Mengencik =

Village in Turkey

- Village
- Location in Turkey
- Coordinates: 40°46′45″N 31°13′40″E
- Country: Turkey
- Province: Düzce
- District: Düzce
- Population (2022): 440
- Time zone: UTC+3 (TRT)

Eski Mengencik is a village in the Düzce District of Düzce Province in Turkey. Its population is 440 (2022).
