= Duraklar, Düzce =

Village in Turkey

Duraklar
- Village
- Location in Turkey
- Coordinates: 40°47′N 31°07′E
- Country: Turkey
- Province: Düzce
- District: Düzce
- Population (2022): 614
- Time zone: UTC+3 (TRT)

Duraklar is a village in the Düzce District of Düzce Province in Turkey. Its population is 614 (2022).
