= Yukarıkaraköy, Çilimli =

Village in Turkey

Yukarıkaraköy
- Village
- Location in Turkey
- Coordinates: 40°53′N 31°00′E
- Country: Turkey
- Province: Düzce
- District: Çilimli
- Population (2022): 424
- Time zone: UTC+3 (TRT)

Yukarıkaraköy is a village in the Çilimli District of Düzce Province in Turkey. Its population is 424 (2022).
