= Çamlıpınar, Cumayeri =

Village in Turkey

Çamlıpınar
- Village
- Location in Turkey
- Coordinates: 40.8987°N 30.9208°E
- Country: Turkey
- Province: Düzce
- District: Cumayeri
- Population (2022): 108
- Time zone: UTC+3 (TRT)

Çamlıpınar is a village in the Cumayeri District of Düzce Province in Turkey. Its population is 108 (2022).
