= Boğaziçi, Düzce =

Boğaziçi
- Municipality
- Location in Turkey
- Coordinates: 40°56′46″N 31°09′58″E
- Country: Turkey
- Province: Düzce
- District: Düzce
- Population (2022): 2,825
- Time zone: UTC+3 (TRT)

Boğaziçi is a town (belde) in the Düzce District, Düzce Province, Turkey. Its population is 2,825 (2022).
