= Yayakbaşı, Düzce =

Village in Turkey

Yayakbaşı
- Village
- Location in Turkey
- Coordinates: 40°50′N 31°01′E
- Country: Turkey
- Province: Düzce
- District: Düzce
- Population (2022): 350
- Time zone: UTC+3 (TRT)

Yayakbaşı is a village in the Düzce District of Düzce Province in Turkey. Its population is 350 (2022).
