= Hacıaliler, Düzce =

Village in Turkey

Hacıaliler
- Village
- Country: Turkey
- Province: Düzce
- District: Düzce
- Population (2022): 635
- Time zone: UTC+3 (TRT)

Hacıaliler is a village in the Düzce District of Düzce Province in Turkey. Its population was 635 in 2022.
