= Çilimli =

- Municipality
- Location within Turkey
- Coordinates: 40°54′N 31°3′E
- Country: Turkey
- Province: Düzce
- District: Çilimli

Government
  - Mayor: Muhsin Yavuz (AKP)
- Population (2022): 9,936
- Time zone: UTC+3 (TRT)
- Area code: 0380
- Climate: Cfb
- Website: www.cilimli.bel.tr

Çilimli is a town in Düzce Province in the Black Sea region of Turkey. It is the seat of Çilimli District. Its population is 9,936 (2022). Çilimli is known for its natural beauties. Çilimli has a similar climate as Düzce: cold in winter and hot in summer. It takes 15–20 minutes to go to Çilimli from Düzce city center.
