= Kemerkasım, Düzce =

Village in Turkey

Kemerkasım
- Village
- Location in Turkey
- Coordinates: 40°55′N 31°12′E
- Country: Turkey
- Province: Düzce
- District: Düzce
- Population (2022): 575
- Time zone: UTC+3 (TRT)

Kemerkasım is a village in the Düzce District of Düzce Province in Turkey. Its population is 575 (2022).
