= Cumayeri =

- Municipality
- Location within Turkey
- Coordinates: 40°52′25″N 30°57′3″E
- Country: Turkey
- Province: Düzce
- District: Cumayeri

Government
  - Mayor: Mustafa Koloğlu (MHP)
- Population (2022): 10,908
- Time zone: UTC+3 (TRT)
- Area code: 0380
- Climate: Cfb
- Website: www.cumayeri.bel.tr

Cumayeri is a town in Düzce Province in the Black Sea region of Turkey. It is the seat of Cumayeri District. Its population is 10,908 (2022). The mayor is Mustafa Koloğlu (MHP), elected in 2019.
