= Darıyeri Hasanbey, Kaynaşlı =

Village in Turkey

Darıyeri Hasanbey
- Village
- Location in Turkey
- Coordinates: 40°46′33″N 31°20′33″E
- Country: Turkey
- Province: Düzce
- District: Kaynaşlı
- Population (2022): 1,833
- Time zone: UTC+3 (TRT)

Darıyeri Hasanbey is a village in the Kaynaşlı District of Düzce Province in Turkey. Its population is 1,833 (2022).
