= Gündolaması, Düzce =

Village in Turkey

Gündolaması
- Village
- Location in Turkey
- Coordinates: 40°50′N 31°13′E
- Country: Turkey
- Province: Düzce
- District: Düzce
- Population (2022): 442
- Time zone: UTC+3 (TRT)

Gündolaması is a village in the Düzce District of Düzce Province in Turkey. Its population is 442 (2022).
