= Pırpır, Çilimli =

Village in Turkey

Pırpır
- Village
- Location in Turkey
- Coordinates: 40°52′2″N 31°1′36″E
- Country: Turkey
- Province: Düzce
- District: Çilimli
- Population (2022): 1,384
- Time zone: UTC+3 (TRT)

Pırpır is a village in the Çilimli District of Düzce Province in Turkey. Its population is 1,384 (2022).
