= Kaynaşlı District =

District of Düzce Province, Turkey

- District
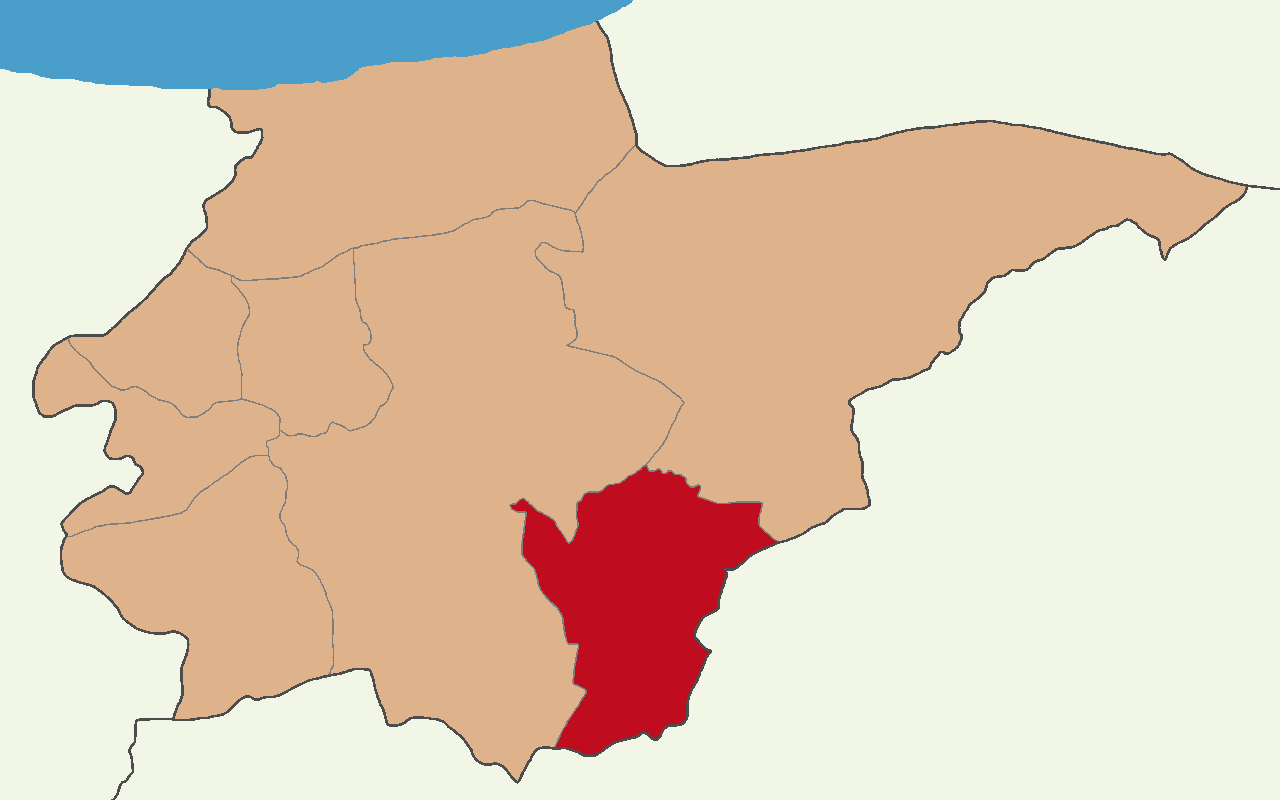
- Map showing Kaynaşlı District in Düzce Province

- Location in Turkey
- Coordinates: 40°46′N 31°19′E
- Country: Turkey
- Province: Düzce
- Seat: Kaynaşlı

Government
  - Kaymakam: Mustafa İkbal Eşki
- Area: 237 km^{2} (92 sq mi)
- Population (2022): 20,449
  - Density: 86/km^{2} (220/sq mi)
- Time zone: UTC+3 (TRT)
- Website: www.kaynasli.gov.tr

Kaynaşlı District is a district of the Düzce Province of Turkey. Its seat is the town of Kaynaşlı. Its area is 237 km^{2}, and its population is 20,449 (2022).

== Composition ==
There is one municipality in Kaynaşlı District:

- Kaynaşlı

There are 20 villages in Kaynaşlı District:

- Altunköy
- Bıçkıyanı
- Çakırsayvan
- Çamlıca
- Çamoluk
- Çatalçam
- Darıyeri Bakacak
- Darıyeri Hasanbey
- Darıyeri Mengencik
- Darıyeri Yörükler
- Dipsizgöl
- Fındıklı
- Hacıazizler
- Muratbey
- Sarıçökek
- Sazköy
- Tavak
- Üçköprü
- Yeniyurt
- Yeşiltepe
