= Hamascık, Cumayeri =

Village in Turkey

Hamascık
- Village
- Location in Turkey
- Coordinates: 40°56′04″N 30°57′02″E
- Country: Turkey
- Province: Düzce
- District: Cumayeri
- Population (2022): 247
- Time zone: UTC+3 (TRT)

Hamascık is a village in the Cumayeri District of Düzce Province in Turkey. Its population is 247 (2022).
