= Soğuksu, Gümüşova =

Village in Turkey

Soğuksu
- Village
- Location in Turkey
- Coordinates: 40.851°N 30.883°E
- Country: Turkey
- Province: Düzce
- District: Gümüşova
- Population (2022): 113
- Time zone: UTC+3 (TRT)

Soğuksu is a village in the Gümüşova District of Düzce Province in Turkey. Its population is 113 (2022).
