= Halilbey, Gümüşova =

Village in Turkey

Halilbey
- Village
- Location in Turkey
- Coordinates: 40.8362°N 30.8868°E
- Country: Turkey
- Province: Düzce
- District: Gümüşova
- Population (2022): 177
- Time zone: UTC+3 (TRT)

Halilbey is a village in the Gümüşova District of Düzce Province in Turkey. Its population is 177 (2022).
