= Köprübaşı, Düzce =

Village in Turkey

Köprübaşı
- Village
- Location in Turkey
- Coordinates: 40°49′N 31°02′E
- Country: Turkey
- Province: Düzce
- District: Düzce
- Population (2022): 395
- Time zone: UTC+3 (TRT)

Köprübaşı is a village in the Düzce District of Düzce Province in Turkey. Its population is 395 (2022).
