= Ordulukaradere, Cumayeri =

Village in Turkey

Ordulukaradere
- Village
- Location in Turkey
- Coordinates: 40°54′N 30°53′E
- Country: Turkey
- Province: Düzce
- District: Cumayeri
- Population (2022): 242
- Time zone: UTC+3 (TRT)

Ordulukaradere is a village in the Cumayeri District of Düzce Province in Turkey. Its population is 242 (2022).
