= Sazköy, Kaynaşlı =

Village in Turkey

Sazköy
- Village
- Location in Turkey
- Coordinates: 40.755°N 31.2677°E
- Country: Turkey
- Province: Düzce
- District: Kaynaşlı
- Population (2022): 139
- Time zone: UTC+3 (TRT)

Sazköy is a village in the Kaynaşlı District of Düzce Province in Turkey. Its population is 139 (2022).
