= Adaköy, Gümüşova =

Village in Turkey

Adaköy
- Village
- Location within Turkey
- Coordinates: 40.8610°N 30.9897°E
- Country: Turkey
- Province: Düzce
- District: Gümüşova
- Population (2022): 334
- Time zone: UTC+3 (TRT)

Adaköy is a village in the Gümüşova District of Düzce Province in Turkey. Its population was 334 in 2022.
