= Cumayeri District =

District of Düzce Province, Turkey

- District
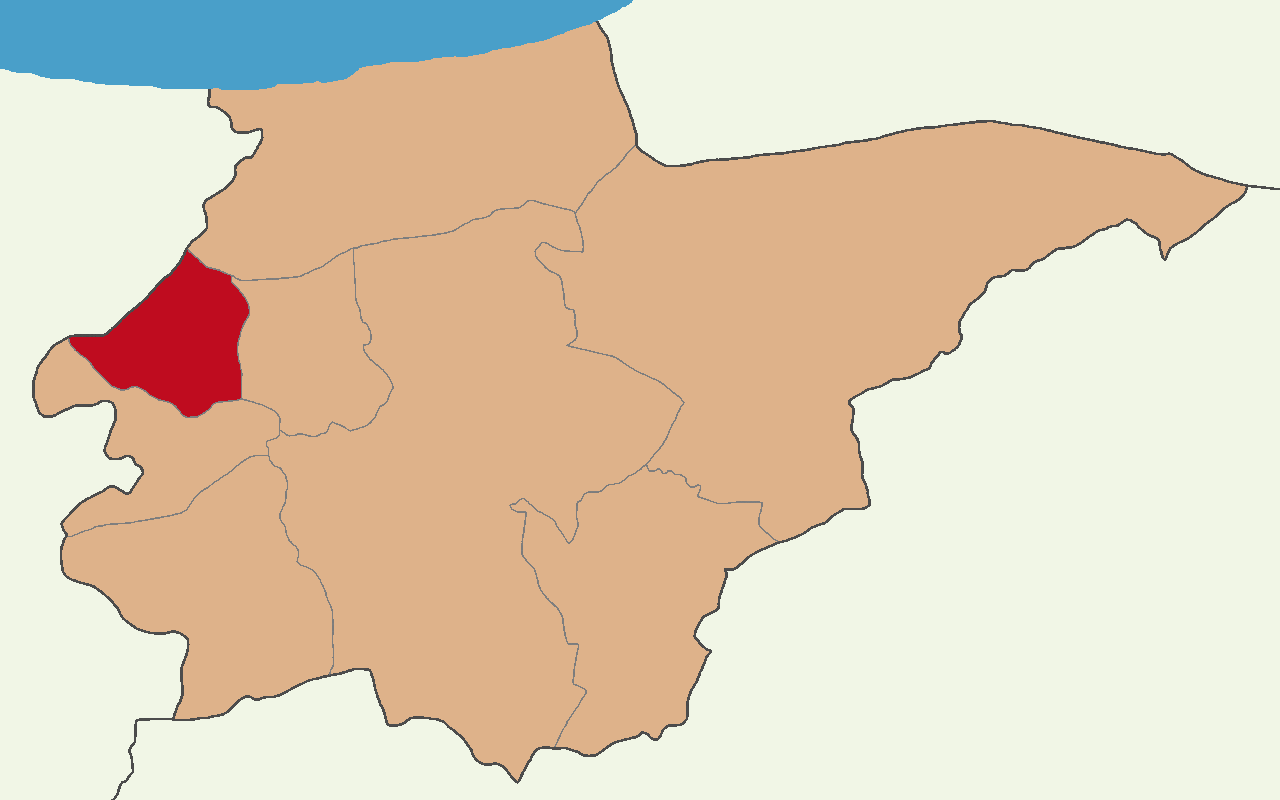
- Map showing Cumayeri District in Düzce Province

- Location in Turkey
- Coordinates: 40°52′N 30°57′E
- Country: Turkey
- Province: Düzce
- Seat: Cumayeri

Government
  - Kaymakam: Bilal Doğan
- Area: 113 km^{2} (44 sq mi)
- Population (2022): 15,214
  - Density: 130/km^{2} (350/sq mi)
- Time zone: UTC+3 (TRT)
- Website: www.cumayeri.gov.tr

Cumayeri District is a district of the Düzce Province of Turkey. Its seat is the town of Cumayeri. Its area is 113 km^{2}, and its population is 15,214 (2022).

== Composition ==
There is one municipality in Cumayeri District:

- Cumayeri

There are 21 villages in Cumayeri District:

- Akpınar
- Avlayan
- Büyükmelen
- Çamlıpınar
- Çelikdere
- Dokuzdeğirmen
- Esentepe
- Hamascık
- Harmankaya
- Iğdır
- Kızılüzüm
- Mısırlık
- Ordulukaradere
- Ören
- Sırtpınar
- Subaşı
- Taşlık
- Üvezbeli
- Yenitepe
- Yeşiltepe
- Yukarıavlayan
