= Bataklıçiftlik, Düzce =

Village in Turkey

Bataklıçiftlik
- Village
- Location in Turkey
- Coordinates: 40°48′N 31°07′E
- Country: Turkey
- Province: Düzce
- District: Düzce
- Population (2022): 191
- Time zone: UTC+3 (TRT)

Bataklıçiftlik is a village in the Düzce District of Düzce Province in Turkey. Its population is 191 (2022).
