= Çaybükü, Gümüşova =

Village in Turkey

Çaybükü
- Village
- Country: Turkey
- Province: Düzce
- District: Gümüşova
- Population (2022): 547
- Time zone: UTC+3 (TRT)

Çaybükü is a village in the Gümüşova District of Düzce Province in Turkey. Its population is 547 (2022).
