= Akyazı, Düzce =

Village in Turkey

Akyazı
- Village
- Location in Turkey
- Coordinates: 40.8999°N 31.2061°E
- Country: Turkey
- Province: Düzce
- District: Düzce
- Population (2022): 403
- Time zone: UTC+3 (TRT)

Akyazı is a village in the Düzce District of Düzce Province in Turkey. Its population is 403 (2022). The Düzce Fault, a part of the North Anatolian Fault that stretches 70 kilometers on which the 1999 Düzce earthquake happened, goes below the village.
