= Bıçkıbaşı, Çilimli =

Village in Turkey

Bıçkıbaşı
- Village
- Location in Turkey
- Coordinates: 40°56′N 31°04′E
- Country: Turkey
- Province: Düzce
- District: Çilimli
- Population (2022): 252
- Time zone: UTC+3 (TRT)

Bıçkıbaşı is a village in the Çilimli District of Düzce Province in Turkey. Its population is 252 (2022).
