= Yeşiltepe, Kaynaşlı =

Village in Turkey

Yeşiltepe
- Village
- Location within Turkey
- Country: Turkey
- Province: Düzce
- District: Kaynaşlı
- Population (2022): 493
- Time zone: UTC+3 (TRT)

Yeşiltepe is a village in the Kaynaşlı District of Düzce Province in Turkey. Its population is 493 (2022).
