= Shazia =

Shazia (Urdu: شازیہ) is a feminine given name of Arabic origin. Notable people with the name include:

== Given name ==
- Shazia Khalid (born 1973), Pakistani medical doctor and advocate of women's human rights
- Shazia Manzoor, singer from Rawalpindi
- Shazia Marri (born 1972), Pakistani politician and provincial Minister for Information of Sindh
- Shazia Mirza (born 1972), British comedian and columnist
- Shazia Tariq (born 1983), Pakistani politician
- Shazia, character from the UK TV show, Citizen Khan
- Shazia Khan, character from the 2019 film Blinded by the Light

== See also ==
Şaziye, Turkish spelling of the name
