= Yörük, Düzce =

Village in Turkey

Yörük
- Village
- Location in Turkey
- Coordinates: 40°54′7″N 31°11′30″E
- Country: Turkey
- Province: Düzce
- District: Düzce
- Population (2022): 2,387
- Time zone: UTC+3 (TRT)

Yörük is a village in the Düzce District of Düzce Province in Turkey. Its population is 2,387 (2022).
