= Çatalçam, Kaynaşlı =

Village in Turkey

Çatalçam
- Village
- Location in Turkey
- Coordinates: 40°42′24″N 31°17′0″E
- Country: Turkey
- Province: Düzce
- District: Kaynaşlı
- Population (2022): 208
- Time zone: UTC+3 (TRT)

Çatalçam is a village in the Kaynaşlı District of Düzce Province in Turkey. Its population is 208 (2022).
