= Sancakdere, Düzce =

Village in Turkey

Sancakdere
- Village
- Country: Turkey
- Province: Düzce
- District: Düzce
- Population (2022): 128
- Time zone: UTC+3 (TRT)

Sancakdere is a village in the Düzce District of Düzce Province in Turkey. Its population is 128 (2022).
