= Derdin, Düzce =

Village in Turkey

Derdin
- Village
- Location in Turkey
- Coordinates: 40°42′N 31°13′E
- Country: Turkey
- Province: Düzce
- District: Düzce
- Population (2022): 341
- Time zone: UTC+3 (TRT)

Derdin is a village in the Düzce District of Düzce Province in Turkey. Its population is 341 (2022).
