= Alacamescit, Çilimli =

Village in Turkey

Alacamescit
- Village
- Location in Turkey
- Coordinates: 40.8620°N 31.0896°E
- Country: Turkey
- Province: Düzce
- District: Çilimli
- Population (2022): 598
- Time zone: UTC+3 (TRT)

Alacamescit is a village in the Çilimli District of Düzce Province in Turkey. Its population is 598 (2022).
