= Karadere, Düzce =

Village in Turkey

Karadere
- Village
- Location in Turkey
- Coordinates: 40°50′26″N 31°3′57″E
- Country: Turkey
- Province: Düzce
- District: Düzce
- Population (2022): 539
- Time zone: UTC+3 (TRT)

Karadere (also: Karadere Hasanağa) is a village in the Düzce District of Düzce Province in Turkey. Its population is 539 (2022).
