= Yeni Taşköprü =

Village in Turkey

- Village
- Location within Turkey
- Coordinates: 40°50′N 31°06′E
- Country: Turkey
- Province: Düzce
- District: Düzce
- Population (2022): 2,011
- Time zone: UTC+3 (TRT)

Yeni Taşköprü or Muhacir Taşköprü is a village in the Düzce District of Düzce Province in Turkey. Its population is 2,011 (2022). It has three neighborhoods(Tınaz, Merkez, Kapancık). Populated by mostly Bulgarian Turks from Karinobat and Razgrad. The village has also Greece Immigrant, Kurdish and Ordulu minorities. The village is near the Small Melen River and has a lot of grassland, where most of the cattles are brought to in the summer period.

Yeni Taşköprü has a middle school, which was renovated during the summerbreak of 2020. The village also has a cosmetics factory that employs 58 women. Tobacco farming used to be done in the Yeni Taşköprü and nearby Muhacir villages until 2000s. Some villagers and people from the nearby Bahçeköy and Paşakonağı have cattle farms.
