= Ardıçdibi, Gümüşova =

Village in Turkey

Ardıçdibi
- Village
- Location in Turkey
- Coordinates: 40.8073°N 30.9380°E
- Country: Turkey
- Province: Düzce
- District: Gümüşova
- Population (2022): 218
- Time zone: UTC+3 (TRT)

Ardıçdibi is a village in the Gümüşova District of Düzce Province in Turkey.

== Population ==
As of 2022, its population is 218.
