= Aynalı, Düzce =

Village in Turkey

Aynalı
- Village
- Location in Turkey
- Coordinates: 40.9093°N 31.1224°E
- Country: Turkey
- Province: Düzce
- District: Düzce
- Population (2022): 410
- Time zone: UTC+3 (TRT)

Aynalı is a village in the Düzce District of Düzce Province in Turkey. Its population is 410 (2022). Located 3 kilometers from Prusias ad Hypium, a floor mosaic part of an ancient villa was excavated near the village in 2016. As of December 2020, a team still continues to work in the area to find more pieces.
