= Yenivakıf, Çilimli =

Village in Turkey

Yenivakıf
- Village
- Location in Turkey
- Coordinates: 40°54′N 31°05′E
- Country: Turkey
- Province: Düzce
- District: Çilimli
- Population (2022): 1,069
- Time zone: UTC+3 (TRT)

Yenivakıf is a village in the Çilimli District of Düzce Province in Turkey. Its population is 1,069 (2022).
