= Yakabaşı, Gümüşova =

Village in Turkey

Yakabaşı
- Village
- Country: Turkey
- Province: Düzce
- District: Gümüşova
- Population (2022): 689
- Time zone: UTC+3 (TRT)

Yakabaşı is a village in the Gümüşova District of Düzce Province in Turkey. Its population is 689 (2022).
