= Paşaormanı, Düzce =

Village in Turkey

Paşaormanı
- Village
- Location in Turkey
- Coordinates: 40°48′N 31°12′E
- Country: Turkey
- Province: Düzce
- District: Düzce
- Population (2022): 570
- Time zone: UTC+3 (TRT)

Paşaormanı is a village in the Düzce District of Düzce Province in Turkey. Its population is 570 (2022).
