= Dipsizgöl, Kaynaşlı =

Village in Turkey

Dipsizgöl
- Village
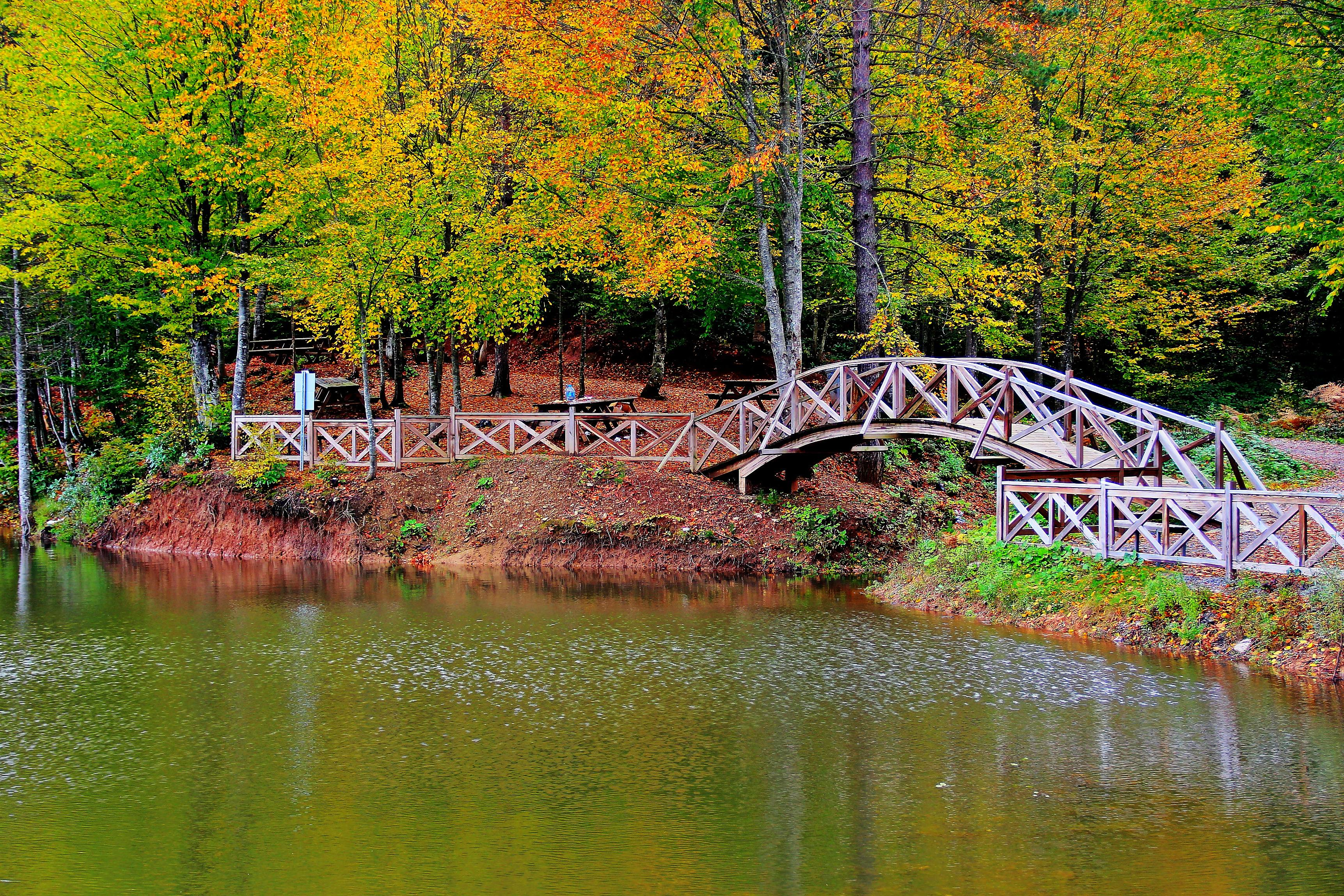

- Location within Turkey
- Country: Turkey
- Province: Düzce
- District: Kaynaşlı
- Population (2022): 554
- Time zone: UTC+3 (TRT)

Dipsizgöl is a village in the Kaynaşlı District of Düzce Province in Turkey. Its population is 554 (2022).
