= Yenitepe, Cumayeri =

Village in Turkey

Yenitepe
- Village
- Country: Turkey
- Province: Düzce
- District: Cumayeri
- Population (2022): 173
- Time zone: UTC+3 (TRT)

Yenitepe is a village in the Cumayeri District of Düzce Province in Turkey. Its population is 173 (2022).
