= Avlayan, Cumayeri =

Village in Turkey

Avlayan
- Village
- Location in Turkey
- Coordinates: 40°53′N 30°59′E
- Country: Turkey
- Province: Düzce
- District: Cumayeri
- Population (2022): 598
- Time zone: UTC+3 (TRT)

Avlayan is a village in the Cumayeri District of Düzce Province in Turkey. Its population is 598 (2022).
