= Sinirci, Düzce =

Village in Turkey

Sinirci
- Village
- Location in Turkey
- Coordinates: 40°49′N 31°09′E
- Country: Turkey
- Province: Düzce
- District: Düzce
- Population (2022): 556
- Time zone: UTC+3 (TRT)

Sinirci is a village in the Düzce District of Düzce Province in Turkey. Its population is 556 (2022).
