= Gökçe, Düzce =

Village in Turkey

Gökçe
- Village
- Location in Turkey
- Coordinates: 40.8151°N 31.2025°E
- Country: Turkey
- Province: Düzce
- District: Düzce
- Population (2022): 676
- Time zone: UTC+3 (TRT)

Gökçe is a village in the Düzce District of Düzce Province in Turkey. Its population is 676 (2022).
