= Düzce District =

District of Düzce Province, Turkey

- District
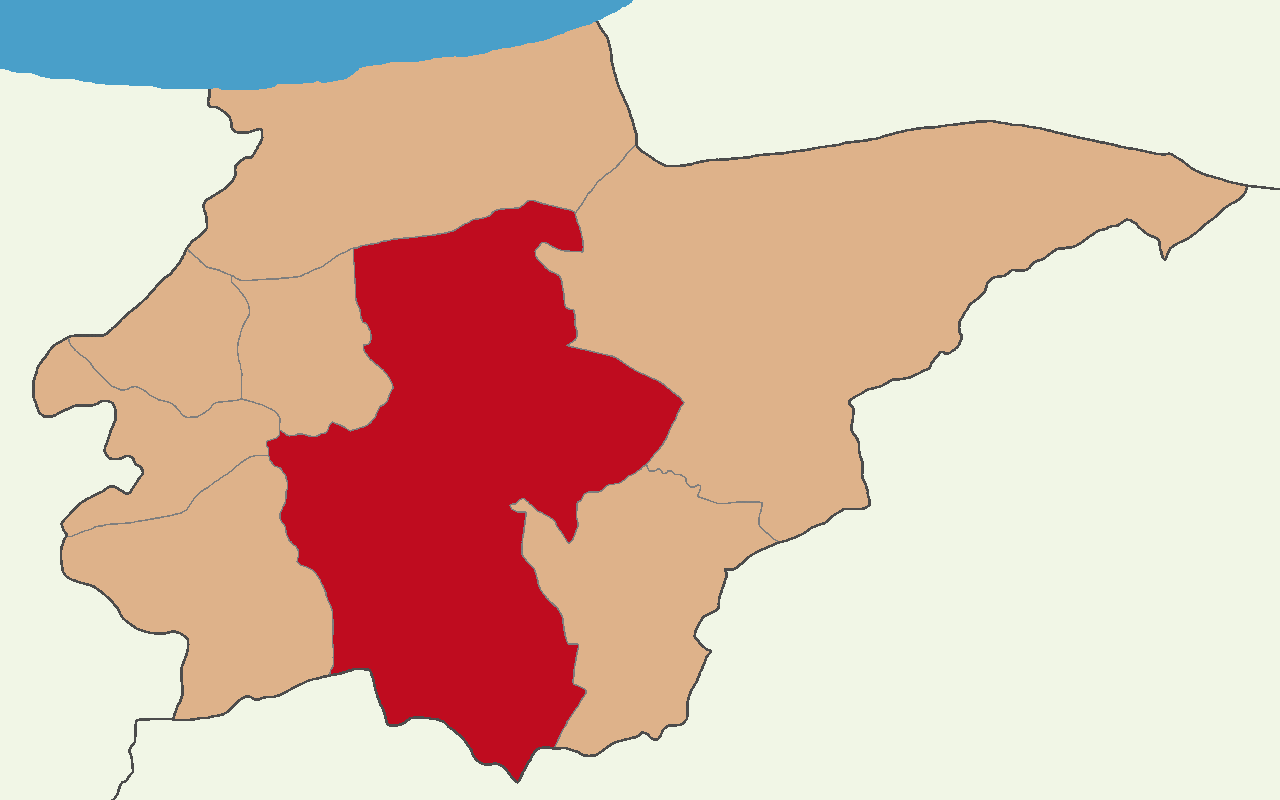
- Map showing Düzce District in Düzce Province

- Location in Turkey
- Coordinates: 40°50′N 31°10′E
- Country: Turkey
- Province: Düzce
- Seat: Düzce
- Area: 710 km^{2} (270 sq mi)
- Population (2022): 258,484
  - Density: 360/km^{2} (940/sq mi)
- Time zone: UTC+3 (TRT)

Düzce District (also: Merkez, meaning "central") is a district of the Düzce Province of Turkey. Its seat is the city of Düzce. Its area is 710 km^{2}, and its population is 258,484 (2022).

== Composition ==
There are three municipalities in Düzce District:

- Beyköy
- Boğaziçi
- Düzce

There are 96 villages in Düzce District:

- Akbıyıklar
- Aktarla
- Akyazı
- Altınpınar
- Asar
- Aybaşı
- Aydınpınar
- Aynalı
- Bahçeköy
- Ballıca
- Bataklıçiftlik
- Bostanlık
- Büyükaçma
- Çakırhacıibrahim
- Çalıcuma
- Çamlısu
- Çınardüzü
- Çınarlı
- Çiftlikköy
- Dağdibi
- Derdin
- Develi Besni
- Doğanlı
- Duraklar
- Düverdüzü
- Düzköy
- Eminaçma
- Erdemli
- Esençam
- Esentepe
- Eski Mengencik
- Fındıklıaksu
- Gökçe
- Gölormanı
- Güldere
- Gümüşpınar
- Günbaşı
- Gündolaması
- Güven
- Hacıahmetler
- Hacıaliler
- Hasanlar
- Hatipliketenciler
- Hocaoğlu
- İhsaniye
- İslahiye
- İstilli
- Kabalak
- Kadıoğlu
- Kaledibi
- Karadere
- Kavakbıçkı
- Kaymakçı
- Kemerkasım
- Kirazlı
- Kızılcık
- Konaklı
- Köprübaşı
- Kozluk
- Küçükahmet
- Küçükmehmet
- Kurtsuyu
- Kuşaçması
- Kutlu
- Mamure
- Muncurlu
- Muradiyemengencik
- Musababa
- Nasırlı
- Nuhlar
- Osmanca
- Otluoğlu
- Ovapınar
- Ozanlar
- Özyanık
- Paşakonağı
- Paşaormanı
- Pınarlar
- Samandere
- Sancakdere
- Şaziye
- Sinirci
- Suncuk
- Taşköprü
- Turaplar
- Üçyol
- Uğur
- Yaka
- Yayakbaşı
- Yayla
- Yeni Aynalı
- Yeni Karaköy
- Yeni Taşköprü
- Yeşilçam
- Yeşilçimen
- Yörük
