= Fındıklıaksu, Düzce =

Village in Turkey

Fındıklıaksu
- Village
- Location in Turkey
- Coordinates: 40°51′N 31°20′E
- Country: Turkey
- Province: Düzce
- District: Düzce
- Population (2022): 147
- Time zone: UTC+3 (TRT)

Fındıklıaksu is a village in the Düzce District of Düzce Province in Turkey. Its population is 147 (2022).
