= Otluoğlu, Düzce =

Village in Turkey

Otluoğlu
- Village
- Location in Turkey
- Coordinates: 40°49′19″N 31°07′57″E
- Country: Turkey
- Province: Düzce
- District: Düzce
- Population (2022): 1,975
- Time zone: UTC+3 (TRT)

Otluoğlu is a village in the Düzce District of Düzce Province in Turkey. Its population is 1,975 (2022).
