= Hacıazizler, Kaynaşlı =

Village in Turkey

Coordinates: 40.70274°N 31.33423°E

Hacıazizler
- Village
- Location in Turkey
- Coordinates
- Country: Turkey
- Province: Düzce
- District: Kaynaşlı
- Population (2022): 41
- Time zone: UTC+3 (TRT)

Hacıazizler is a village in the Kaynaşlı District of Düzce Province in Turkey. Its population is 41 (2022).
