= Kadıoğlu, Düzce =

Village in Turkey

Kadıoğlu
- Village
- Location within Turkey
- Coordinates: 40.876°N 31.123°E
- Country: Turkey
- Province: Düzce
- District: Düzce
- Population (2022): 378
- Time zone: UTC+3 (TRT)

Kadıoğlu is a village in the Düzce District, Düzce Province, Turkey. Its population is 378 (2022).
