= Çakırhacıibrahim, Düzce =

Village in Turkey

Çakırhacıibrahim
- Village
- Location in Turkey
- Coordinates: 40°46′N 31°08′E
- Country: Turkey
- Province: Düzce
- District: Düzce
- Population (2022): 498
- Time zone: UTC+3 (TRT)

Çakırhacıibrahim is a village in the Düzce District of Düzce Province in Turkey. Its population is 498 (2022).
