= Darıyeri Bakacak, Kaynaşlı =

Village in Turkey

Darıyeri Bakacak
- Village
- Country: Turkey
- Province: Düzce
- District: Kaynaşlı
- Population (2022): 292
- Time zone: UTC+3 (TRT)

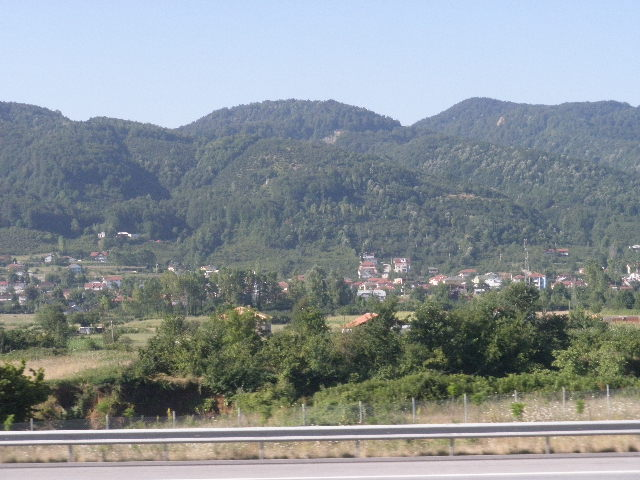
Photo of Darıyeri Bakacak Village, Kaynaşlı, Düzce

Darıyeri Bakacak is a village in the Kaynaşlı District of Düzce Province in Turkey. Its population is 292 (2022).
