= Eminaçma, Düzce =

Village in Turkey

Eminaçma
- Village
- Country: Turkey
- Province: Düzce
- District: Düzce
- Population (2022): 243
- Time zone: UTC+3 (TRT)

Eminaçma is a village in the Düzce District of Düzce Province in Turkey. Its population is 243 (2022).
