= Hocaoğlu, Düzce =

Village in Turkey

Hocaoğlu
- Village
- Location in Turkey
- Coordinates: 40°48′06″N 31°06′18″E
- Country: Turkey
- Province: Düzce
- District: Düzce
- Population (2022): 284
- Time zone: UTC+3 (TRT)

Hocaoğlu is a village in the Düzce District of Düzce Province in Turkey. Its population is 284 (2022).
