= Suncuk, Düzce =

Village in Turkey

Suncuk
- Village
- Location in Turkey
- Coordinates: 40°57′N 31°09′E
- Country: Turkey
- Province: Düzce
- District: Düzce
- Population (2022): 366
- Time zone: UTC+3 (TRT)

Suncuk is a village in the Düzce District of Düzce Province in Turkey. Its population is 366 (2022). Most villagers are ethnically Laz.
