= Altunköy, Kaynaşlı =

Village in Turkey

Altunköy
- Village
- Location in Turkey
- Coordinates: 40°43′N 31°19′E
- Country: Turkey
- Province: Düzce
- District: Kaynaşlı
- Population (2022): 115
- Time zone: UTC+3 (TRT)

Altunköy is a village in the Kaynaşlı District of Düzce Province in Turkey. Its population is 115 (2022).
