= İhsaniye, Düzce =

Village in Turkey

İhsaniye
- Village
- Country: Turkey
- Province: Düzce
- District: Düzce
- Population (2022): 826
- Time zone: UTC+3 (TRT)

İhsaniye is a village in the Düzce District of Düzce Province in Turkey. Its population is 826 (2022).
