= Fındıklı, Kaynaşlı =

Village in Turkey

Fındıklı
- Village
- Location in Turkey
- Coordinates: 40°46′34″N 31°15′22″E
- Country: Turkey
- Province: Düzce
- District: Kaynaşlı
- Population (2022): 296
- Time zone: UTC+3 (TRT)

Fındıklı is a village in the Kaynaşlı District of Düzce Province in Turkey. Its population is 296 (2022).
