= Darıyeri Yörükler, Kaynaşlı =

Village in Turkey

Darıyeri Yörükler
- Village
- Country: Turkey
- Province: Düzce
- District: Kaynaşlı
- Population (2022): 593
- Time zone: UTC+3 (TRT)

Darıyeri Yörükler is a village in the Kaynaşlı District of Düzce Province in Turkey. Its population is 593 (2022).
