= Dededüzü, Gümüşova =

Village in Turkey

Dededüzü
- Village
- Location in Turkey
- Coordinates: 40°53′N 30°51′E
- Country: Turkey
- Province: Düzce
- District: Gümüşova
- Population (2022): 369
- Time zone: UTC+3 (TRT)

Dededüzü is a village in the Gümüşova District of Düzce Province in Turkey. Its population is 369 (2022).
