= Düverdüzü, Düzce =

Village in Turkey

Düverdüzü
- Village
- Location in Turkey
- Coordinates: 40°56′N 31°06′E
- Country: Turkey
- Province: Düzce
- District: Düzce
- Population (2022): 424
- Time zone: UTC+3 (TRT)

Düverdüzü is a village in the Düzce District of Düzce Province in Turkey. Its population is 424 (2022).
