= Düzköy, Düzce =

Village in Turkey

Düzköy
- Village
- Location in Turkey
- Coordinates: 40°55′30″N 31°9′18″E
- Country: Turkey
- Province: Düzce
- District: Düzce
- Population (2022): 834
- Time zone: UTC+3 (TRT)

Düzköy is a village in the Düzce District of Düzce Province in Turkey. Its population is 834 (2022).
