= Çamlıca, Kaynaşlı =

Village in Turkey

Çamlıca
- Village
- Location in Turkey
- Coordinates: 40.7252°N 31.3413°E
- Country: Turkey
- Province: Düzce
- District: Kaynaşlı
- Population (2022): 95
- Time zone: UTC+3 (TRT)

Çamlıca is a village in the Kaynaşlı District of Düzce Province in Turkey. Its population is 95 (2022).
