= Doğanlı, Düzce =

Village in Turkey

Doğanlı
- Village
- Location in Turkey
- Coordinates: 40°48′3″N 31°14′12″E
- Country: Turkey
- Province: Düzce
- District: Düzce
- Population (2022): 2,102
- Time zone: UTC+3 (TRT)

Doğanlı is a village in the Düzce District of Düzce Province in Turkey. Its population is 2,102 (2022).
