= Esentepe, Düzce =

Village in Turkey

Esentepe
- Village
- Location in Turkey
- Coordinates: 40.8889°N 31.2444°E
- Country: Turkey
- Province: Düzce
- District: Düzce
- Population (2022): 401
- Time zone: UTC+3 (TRT)

Esentepe is a village in the Düzce District of Düzce Province in Turkey. Its population is 401 (2022).
