= Kuşoğlu, Çilimli =

Village in Turkey

Kuşoğlu
- Village
- Location in Turkey
- Coordinates: 40°52′40″N 31°04′50″E
- Country: Turkey
- Province: Düzce
- District: Çilimli
- Population (2022): 288
- Time zone: UTC+3 (TRT)

Kuşoğlu is a village in the Çilimli District of Düzce Province in Turkey. Its population is 288 (2022).
