= Kızılüzüm, Cumayeri =

Village in Turkey

Kızılüzüm
- Village
- Country: Turkey
- Province: Düzce
- District: Cumayeri
- Population (2022): 152
- Time zone: UTC+3 (TRT)

Kızılüzüm is a village in the Cumayeri District of Düzce Province in Turkey. Its population is 152 (2022).
