= Yongalık, Gümüşova =

Village in Turkey

Yongalık
- Village
- Country: Turkey
- Province: Düzce
- District: Gümüşova
- Population (2022): 252
- Time zone: UTC+3 (TRT)

Yongalık is a village in the Gümüşova District of Düzce Province in Turkey. Its population is 252 (2022).
