= Uğur, Düzce =

Village in Turkey

Uğur
- Village
- Country: Turkey
- Province: Düzce
- District: Düzce
- Population (2022): 535
- Time zone: UTC+3 (TRT)

Uğur (also: Uğurköy) is a village in the Düzce District of Düzce Province in Turkey. Its population is 535 (2022).
