= Çilimli District =

District of Düzce Province, Turkey

- District
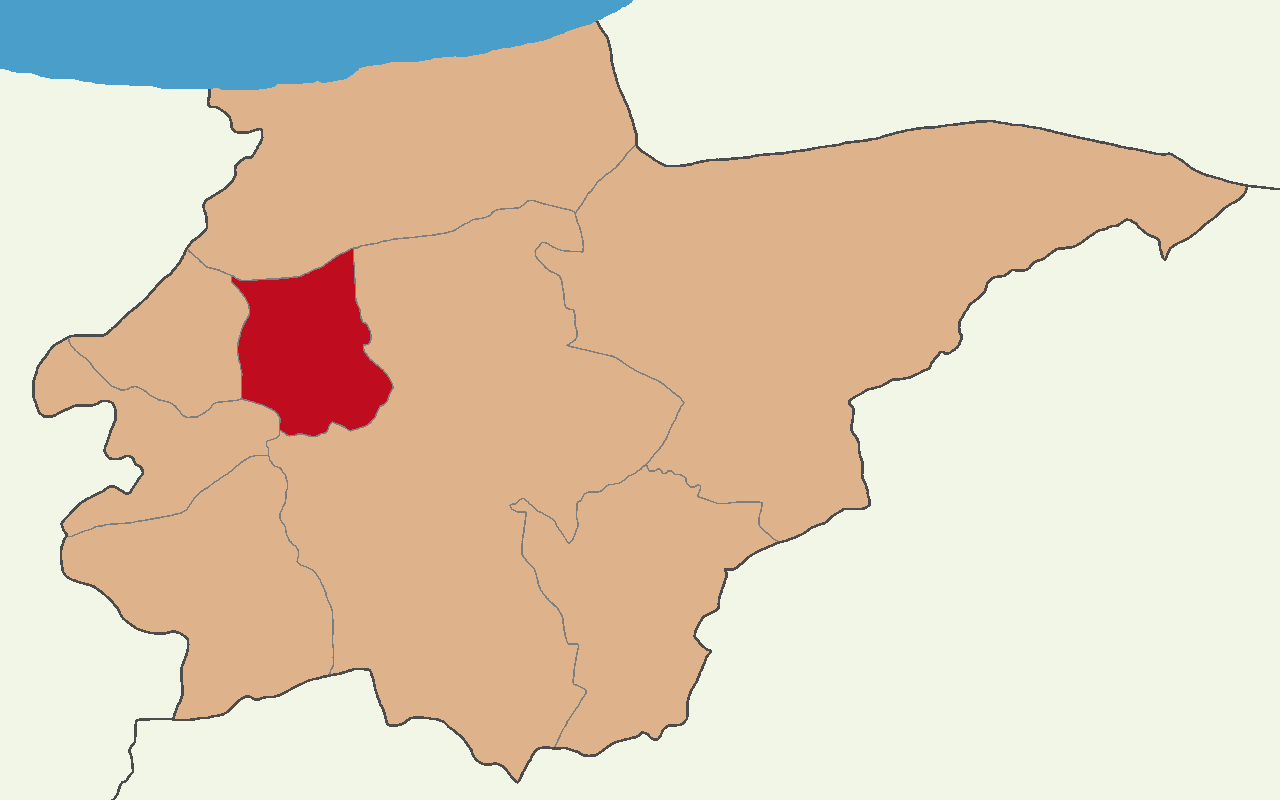
- Map showing Çilimli District in Düzce Province

- Location within Turkey
- Coordinates: 40°54′N 31°3′E
- Country: Turkey
- Province: Düzce
- Seat: Çilimli

Government
  - Kaymakam: Gizem Bayguş
- Area: 85 km^{2} (33 sq mi)
- Population (2022): 19,648
  - Density: 230/km^{2} (600/sq mi)
- Time zone: UTC+3 (TRT)
- Website: www.cilimli.gov.tr

Çilimli District is a district of the Düzce Province of Turkey. Its seat is the town of Çilimli. Its area is 85 km^{2}, and its population is 19,648 (2022).

== Composition ==
There is one municipality in Çilimli District:

- Çilimli

There are 20 villages in Çilimli District:

- Alacamescit
- Bıçkıbaşı
- Çalılık
- Dikmeli
- Döngelli
- Esenli
- Hızardere
- İshaklar
- Kafyayla
- Karaçörtlen
- Kırkharman
- Kiraztarla
- Kuşoğlu
- Pırpır
- Sarımeşe
- Söğütlü
- Tepeköy
- Yeniköy
- Yenivakıf
- Yukarıkaraköy
