= Gölormanı, Düzce =

Village in Turkey

Gölormanı
- Village
- Location in Turkey
- Coordinates: 40°45′20″N 31°04′57″E
- Country: Turkey
- Province: Düzce
- District: Düzce
- Population (2022): 1,977
- Time zone: UTC+3 (TRT)

Gölormanı is a village in the Düzce District of Düzce Province in Turkey. Its population is 1,977 (2022).
