= Esençam, Düzce =

Village in Turkey

Esençam
- Village
- Location in Turkey
- Coordinates: 40°53′51″N 31°15′49″E
- Country: Turkey
- Province: Düzce
- District: Düzce
- Population (2022): 461
- Time zone: UTC+3 (TRT)

Esençam is a village in the Düzce District of Düzce Province in Turkey. Its population is 461 as of the 2022 census.
