= Karaçörtlen, Çilimli =

Village in Turkey

Karaçörtlen
- Village
- Location in Turkey
- Coordinates: 40°55′N 31°00′E
- Country: Turkey
- Province: Düzce
- District: Çilimli
- Population (2022): 366
- Time zone: UTC+3 (TRT)

Karaçörtlen is a village in the Çilimli District of Düzce Province in Turkey. Its population is 366 (2022).
