= Tavak, Kaynaşlı =

Village in Turkey

Tavak
- Village
- Country: Turkey
- Province: Düzce
- District: Kaynaşlı
- Population (2022): 374
- Time zone: UTC+3 (TRT)

Tavak is a village in the Kaynaşlı District of Düzce Province in Turkey. Its population is 374 (2022).
