= Hacıkadirler, Gümüşova =

Village in Turkey

Hacıkadirler
- Village
- Location in Turkey
- Coordinates: 40.85419°N 31.01245°E
- Country: Turkey
- Province: Düzce
- District: Gümüşova
- Population (2022): 702
- Time zone: UTC+3 (TRT)

Hacıkadirler is a village in the Gümüşova District of Düzce Province in Turkey. Its population is 702 (2022).
