= Çiftlikköy, Düzce =

Village in Turkey

Çiftlikköy
- Village
- Country: Turkey
- Province: Düzce
- District: Düzce
- Population (2022): 792
- Time zone: UTC+3 (TRT)

Çiftlikköy is a village in the Düzce District of Düzce Province in Turkey. Its population is 792 (2022).
