= Mamure, Düzce =

Village in Turkey

Mamure
- Village
- Country: Turkey
- Province: Düzce
- District: Düzce
- Population (2022): 344
- Time zone: UTC+3 (TRT)

Mamure is a village in the Düzce District of Düzce Province in Turkey. Its population is 344 (2022). The village is populated by Kurds.
