= Elmacık, Gümüşova =

Village in Turkey

Elmacık
- Village
- Country: Turkey
- Province: Düzce
- District: Gümüşova
- Population (2022): 718
- Time zone: UTC+3 (TRT)

Elmacık is a village in the Gümüşova District of Düzce Province in Turkey. Its population is 718 (2022).
