= İslahiye, Düzce =

Village in Turkey

İslahiye
- Village
- Country: Turkey
- Province: Düzce
- District: Düzce
- Population (2022): 622
- Time zone: UTC+3 (TRT)

İslahiye is a village in the Düzce District of Düzce Province in Turkey. Its population is 622 (2022).
