= Muradiyemengencik, Düzce =

Village in Turkey

Muradiyemengencik
- Village
- Location in Turkey
- Coordinates: 40°47′10″N 31°13′15″E
- Country: Turkey
- Province: Düzce
- District: Düzce
- Population (2022): 518
- Time zone: UTC+3 (TRT)

Muradiyemengencik is a village in the Düzce District of Düzce Province in Turkey. Its population is 518 (2022).
