= İstilli, Düzce =

Village in Turkey

İstilli
- Village
- Location in Turkey
- Coordinates: 40°50′N 31°05′E
- Country: Turkey
- Province: Düzce
- District: Düzce
- Population (2022): 620
- Time zone: UTC+3 (TRT)

İstilli is a village in the Düzce District of Düzce Province in Turkey. Its population is 620 (2022).
