= Kiraztarla, Çilimli =

Village in Turkey

Kiraztarla
- Village
- Location in Turkey
- Coordinates: 40°53′10″N 31°05′25″E
- Country: Turkey
- Province: Düzce
- District: Çilimli
- Population (2022): 269
- Time zone: UTC+3 (TRT)

Kiraztarla is a village in the Çilimli District of Düzce Province in Turkey. Its population is 269 (2022).
