= Sırtpınar, Cumayeri =

Village in Turkey

Sırtpınar
- Village
- Location in Turkey
- Coordinates: 40°53′N 30°56′E
- Country: Turkey
- Province: Düzce
- District: Cumayeri
- Population (2022): 126
- Time zone: UTC+3 (TRT)

Sırtpınar is a village in the Cumayeri District of Düzce Province in Turkey. Its population is 126 (2022).
