= Muratbey, Kaynaşlı =

Village in Turkey

Muratbey
- Village
- Country: Turkey
- Province: Düzce
- District: Kaynaşlı
- Population (2022): 166
- Time zone: UTC+3 (TRT)

Muratbey is a village in the Kaynaşlı District of Düzce Province in Turkey. Its population is 166 (2022).
