= Küçükahmet, Düzce =

Village in Turkey

Küçükahmet
- Village
- Location in Turkey
- Coordinates: 40°47′45″N 31°07′52″E
- Country: Turkey
- Province: Düzce
- District: Düzce
- Population (2022): 402
- Time zone: UTC+3 (TRT)

Küçükahmet is a village in the Düzce District of Düzce Province in Turkey. Its population is 402 (2022).
