= Paşakonağı, Düzce =

Village in Turkey

Paşakonağı
- Village
- Country: Turkey
- Province: Düzce
- District: Düzce
- Population (2022): 153
- Time zone: UTC+3 (TRT)

Paşakonağı is a village in the Düzce District of Düzce Province in Turkey. Its population is 153 (2022). Mostly populated by Kurds, the village is located near the Small Melen River and has a lot of grassland, where most of the water buffalo are brought to in the summer period. Most villagers and people from the nearby Bahçeköy and Yenitaşköprü have water buffalo farms.

On 17 November 2021, an earthquake happened near the village, 9.3 kilometres (5.8 mi) below the surface.
