= Gümüşpınar, Düzce =

Village in Turkey

Gümüşpınar
- Village
- Country: Turkey
- Province: Düzce
- District: Düzce
- Population (2022): 892
- Time zone: UTC+3 (TRT)

Gümüşpınar is a village in the Düzce District of Düzce Province in Turkey. Its population is 892 (2022). The Gümüşpınar Mehmetçik primary school, which has a total of 240 students, opened in 2014 and was renovated in 2018. Some students are coming from neighbouring villages as it is the only school in the region. The bus line from Muncurlu to the Düzce city operated by the municipality passes through Gümüşpınar since 2016.
