= Gümüşova District =

District of Düzce Province, Turkey

- District
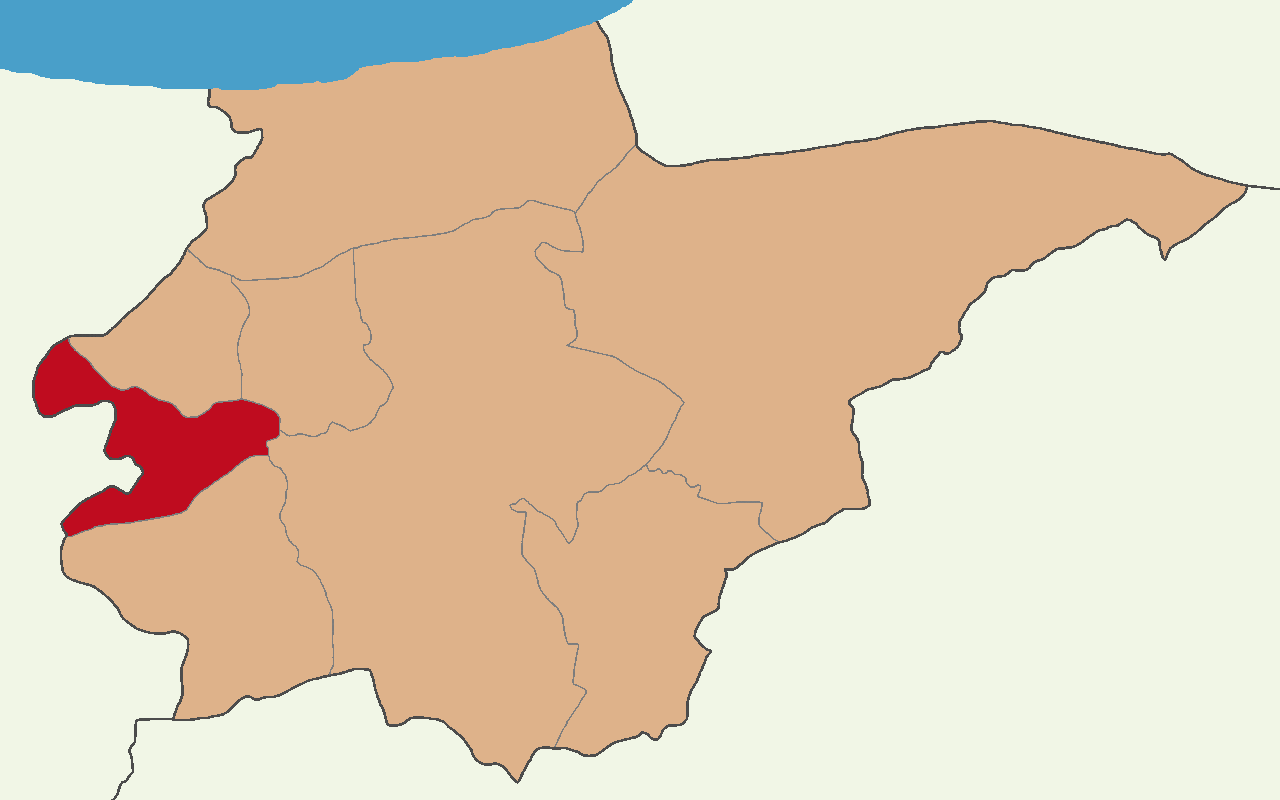
- Map showing Gümüşova District in Düzce Province

- Location in Turkey
- Coordinates: 40°51′N 30°56′E
- Country: Turkey
- Province: Düzce
- Seat: Gümüşova

Government
  - Kaymakam: Selçuk Yosunkaya
- Area: 103 km^{2} (40 sq mi)
- Population (2022): 16,844
  - Density: 160/km^{2} (420/sq mi)
- Time zone: UTC+3 (TRT)
- Website: www.gumusova.gov.tr

Gümüşova District is a district of the Düzce Province of Turkey. Its seat is the town of Gümüşova. Its area is 103 km^{2}, and its population is 16,844 (2022).

== Composition ==
There is one municipality in Gümüşova District:

- Gümüşova

There are 21 villages in Gümüşova District:

- Adaköy
- Ardıçdibi
- Çaybükü
- Dededüzü
- Dereköy
- Elmacık
- Hacıkadirler
- Halilbey
- Kahveleryanı
- Kıyıköy
- Pazarcık
- Selamlar
- Soğuksu
- Sultaniye
- Yakabaşı
- Yeşilyayla
- Yıldıztepe
- Yongalık
