= Büyükaçma, Düzce =

Village in Turkey

Büyükaçma
- Village
- Location in Turkey
- Coordinates: 40°47′N 31°10′E
- Country: Turkey
- Province: Düzce
- District: Düzce
- Population (2022): 676
- Time zone: UTC+3 (TRT)

Büyükaçma is a village in the Düzce District of Düzce Province in Turkey. Its population is 676 (2022).
