= Taşköprü, Düzce =

Village in Turkey

Taşköprü
- Neighbourhood
- Country: Turkey
- Province: Düzce
- District: Düzce
- Population (2022): 740
- Time zone: UTC+3 (TRT)

Taşköprü is a neighbourhood (Turkish: mahalle) in the Düzce District of Düzce Province in Turkey. Its population is 740 (2022). The village has a significant Circassian population, and was officially called Çerkez Taşköprü until 2023 when it was demoted from village (Turkish: köy) status, during which the ethnonym Çerkez was removed. This caused controversy among the Circassian community who are currently campaigning to reverse these changes.
