= Çınardüzü, Düzce =

Village in Turkey

Çınardüzü
- Village
- Location in Turkey
- Coordinates: 40°45′N 31°10′E
- Country: Turkey
- Province: Düzce
- District: Düzce
- Population (2022): 511
- Time zone: UTC+3 (TRT)

Çınardüzü is a village in the Düzce District of Düzce Province in Turkey. Its population is 511 (2022).
