= Turaplar, Düzce =

Village in Turkey

Turaplar
- Village
- Location in Turkey
- Coordinates: 40°49′N 31°07′E
- Country: Turkey
- Province: Düzce
- District: Düzce
- Population (2022): 394
- Time zone: UTC+3 (TRT)

Turaplar is a village in the Düzce District of Düzce Province in Turkey. Its population is 394 (2022).
