= Üçyol, Düzce =

Village in Turkey

Üçyol
- Village
- Location in Turkey
- Coordinates: 40°50′02″N 31°02′48″E
- Country: Turkey
- Province: Düzce
- District: Düzce
- Population (2022): 900
- Time zone: UTC+3 (TRT)

Üçyol is a village in the Düzce District of Düzce Province in Turkey. Its population is 900 (2022).
