= Kaynaşlı =

- Municipality
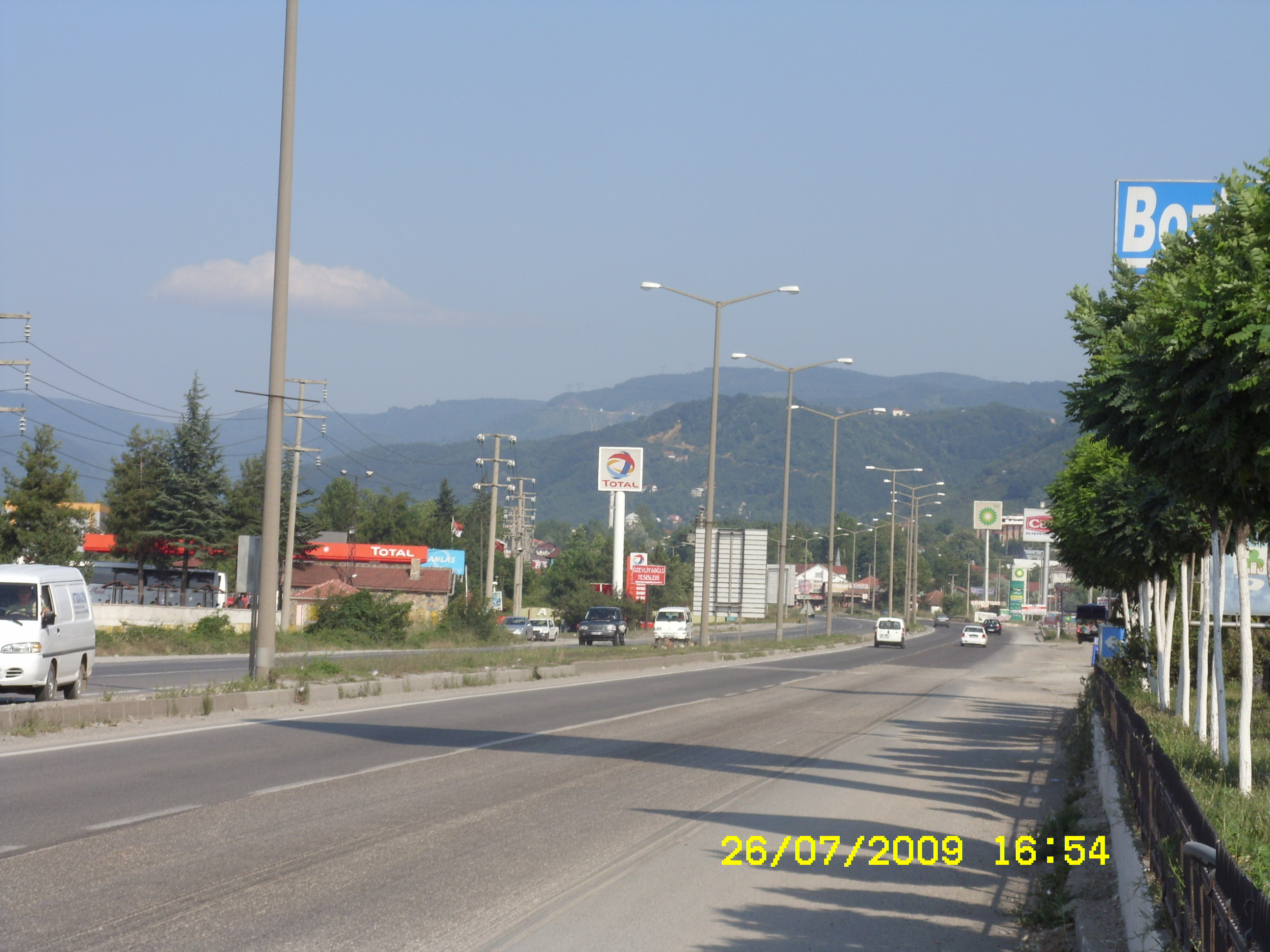

- Location within Turkey
- Coordinates: 40°46′N 31°19′E
- Country: Turkey
- Province: Düzce
- District: Kaynaşlı

Government
  - Mayor: Efdal Altundal (MIlliyetci Hareket Partisi)
- Population (2022): 10,176
- Time zone: UTC+3 (TRT)
- Area code: 0380
- Climate: Cfb
- Website: www.kaynasli.bel.tr

Kaynaşlı is a town in Düzce Province in the Black Sea region of Turkey. It is the seat of Kaynaşlı District. Its population is 10,176 (2022). The mayor is Efdal Altundal.
