= Bıçkıyanı, Kaynaşlı =

Village in Turkey

Bıçkıyanı
- Village
- Location in Turkey
- Coordinates: 40.7154°N 31.3598°E
- Country: Turkey
- Province: Düzce
- District: Kaynaşlı
- Population (2022): 371
- Time zone: UTC+3 (TRT)

Bıçkıyanı is a village in the Kaynaşlı District of Düzce Province in Turkey. Its population is 371 (2022).
