= Dikmeli, Çilimli =

Village in Turkey

Dikmeli
- Village
- Country: Turkey
- Province: Düzce
- District: Çilimli
- Population (2022): 685
- Time zone: UTC+3 (TRT)

Dikmeli is a village in the Çilimli District of Düzce Province in Turkey. Its population is 685 (2022).
