= Sarıçökek, Kaynaşlı =

Village in Turkey

Sarıçökek
- Village
- Location in Turkey
- Coordinates: 40°47′N 31°19′E
- Country: Turkey
- Province: Düzce
- District: Kaynaşlı
- Population (2022): 827
- Time zone: UTC+3 (TRT)

Sarıçökek is a village in the Kaynaşlı District of Düzce Province in Turkey. Its population is 827 (2022).
