= Akpınar, Cumayeri =

Village in Turkey

Akpınar
- Village
- Location in Turkey
- Coordinates: 40.9294°N 30.9650°E
- Country: Turkey
- Province: Düzce
- District: Cumayeri
- Population (2022): 131
- Time zone: UTC+3 (TRT)

Akpınar is a village in the Cumayeri District of Düzce Province in Turkey. Its population is 131 (2022).
