= Erdemli, Düzce =

Village in Turkey

Erdemli
- Village
- Country: Turkey
- Province: Düzce
- District: Düzce
- Population (2022): 92
- Time zone: UTC+3 (TRT)

Erdemli is a village in the Düzce District of Düzce Province in Turkey. Its population is 92 (2022).
