= Özyanık, Düzce =

Village in Turkey

Özyanık
- Village
- Location in Turkey
- Coordinates: 40°41′N 31°15′E
- Country: Turkey
- Province: Düzce
- District: Düzce
- Population (2022): 285
- Time zone: UTC+3 (TRT)

Özyanık is a village in the Düzce District of Düzce Province in Turkey. Its population is 285 (2022).
