= Çalıcuma, Düzce =

Village in Turkey

Çalıcuma
- Village
- Location in Turkey
- Coordinates: 40°47′47″N 31°10′19″E
- Country: Turkey
- Province: Düzce
- District: Düzce
- Population (2022): 527
- Time zone: UTC+3 (TRT)

Çalıcuma is a village in the Düzce District of Düzce Province in Turkey. Its population is 527 (2022).
