= Yukarıavlayan, Cumayeri =

Village in Turkey

Yukarıavlayan
- Village
- Location in Turkey
- Coordinates: 40°53′N 30°58′E
- Country: Turkey
- Province: Düzce
- District: Cumayeri
- Population (2022): 447
- Time zone: UTC+3 (TRT)

Yukarıavlayan is a village in the Cumayeri District of Düzce Province in Turkey. Its population is 447 (2022).
