= Kabalak, Düzce =

Village in Turkey

Kabalak
- Village
- Location in Turkey
- Coordinates: 40°57′40″N 31°10′37″E
- Country: Turkey
- Province: Düzce
- District: Düzce
- Population (2022): 970
- Time zone: UTC+3 (TRT)

Kabalak is a village in the Düzce District of Düzce Province in Turkey. Its population was 970 as of 2022.
