= Kahveleryanı, Gümüşova =

Village in Turkey

Kahveleryanı
- Village
- Location in Turkey
- Coordinates: 40°51′41″N 31°00′26″E
- Country: Turkey
- Province: Düzce
- District: Gümüşova
- Population (2022): 303
- Time zone: UTC+3 (TRT)

Kahveleryanı is a village in the Gümüşova District of Düzce Province in Turkey. Its population is 303 (2022).
