= Darıyeri Mengencik, Kaynaşlı =

Village in Turkey

Darıyeri Mengencik
- Village
- Country: Turkey
- Province: Düzce
- District: Kaynaşlı
- Population (2022): 832
- Time zone: UTC+3 (TRT)

Darıyeri Mengencik is a village in the Kaynaşlı District of Düzce Province in Turkey. Its population is 832 (2022).
