= Yeni Karaköy =

Village in Turkey

- Village
- Location in Turkey
- Coordinates: 40°47′N 31°06′E
- Country: Turkey
- Province: Düzce
- District: Düzce
- Population (2022): 437
- Time zone: UTC+3 (TRT)

Yeni Karaköy is a village in the Düzce District of Düzce Province in Turkey. Its population is 437 (2022).
