= Gümüşova =

- Municipality
- Location within Turkey
- Coordinates: 40°51′N 30°56′E
- Country: Turkey
- Province: Düzce
- District: Gümüşova

Government
  - Mayor: Muharrem Tozan (MHP)
- Population (2022): 9,408
- Time zone: UTC+3 (TRT)
- Area code: 0380
- Climate: Cfb
- Website: www.gumusova.bel.tr

Gümüşova is a town in Düzce Province in the Black Sea region of Turkey. It is the seat of Gümüşova District. Its population is 9,408 (2022). The mayor is Muharrem Tozan (MHP), elected in 2019.
