= Taşlık, Cumayeri =

Village in Turkey

Taşlık
- Village
- Country: Turkey
- Province: Düzce
- District: Cumayeri
- Population (2022): 120
- Time zone: UTC+3 (TRT)

Taşlık is a village in the Cumayeri District of Düzce Province in Turkey. Its population is 120 (2022).
