= Şaziye, Düzce =

Village in Turkey

Şaziye
- Village
- Location in Turkey
- Coordinates: 40°51′N 31°03′E
- Country: Turkey
- Province: Düzce
- District: Düzce
- Population (2022): 796
- Time zone: UTC+3 (TRT)

Şaziye is a village in the Düzce District of Düzce Province in Turkey. Its population is 796 (2022).
