= Muncurlu, Düzce =

Village in Turkey

Muncurlu
- Village
- Location in Turkey
- Coordinates: 40°49′N 31°15′E
- Country: Turkey
- Province: Düzce
- District: Düzce
- Population (2022): 1,387
- Time zone: UTC+3 (TRT)

Muncurlu is a village that is located in the Düzce District of Düzce Province in Turkey. Its population as of 2022 was 1,387. The Physical Therapy and Rehabilitation Center of the Düzce Atatürk State Hospital is located in the village.

The village has a pond owned by the Düzce municipality, who are planning to build a restaurant, wedding venue, zipline and a playground. A bus line from Muncurlu to the Düzce city has been operated by the municipality since 2016.
