= Kızılcık, Düzce =

Village in Turkey

Kızılcık
- Village
- Country: Turkey
- Province: Düzce
- District: Düzce
- Population (2022): 214
- Time zone: UTC+3 (TRT)

Kızılcık is a village in the Düzce District of Düzce Province in Turkey. Its population is 214 (2022).
