= Ballıca, Düzce =

Village in Turkey

Ballıca
- Village
- Location in Turkey
- Coordinates: 40.7808°N 31.1036°E
- Country: Turkey
- Province: Düzce
- District: Düzce
- Population (2022): 919
- Time zone: UTC+3 (TRT)

Ballıca is a village in the Düzce District of Düzce Province in Turkey. Its population is 919 (2022). The village is populated by Kurds.
