= Aktarla, Düzce =

Village in Turkey

Aktarla
- Village
- Location in Turkey
- Coordinates: 40.7446°N 31.1504°E
- Country: Turkey
- Province: Düzce
- District: Düzce
- Population (2022): 164
- Time zone: UTC+3 (TRT)

Aktarla is a village in the Düzce District of Düzce Province in Turkey. Its population is 164 (2022).
