= Asar, Yığılca =

Village in Turkey

Asar
- Village
- Location in Turkey
- Coordinates: 40.9582°N 31.3320°E
- Country: Turkey
- Province: Düzce
- District: Yığılca
- Population (2022): 161
- Time zone: UTC+3 (TRT)

Asar is a village in the Yığılca District of Düzce Province in Turkey. Its population is 161 (2022).
