= Günbaşı, Düzce =

Village in Turkey

Günbaşı
- Village
- Country: Turkey
- Province: Düzce
- District: Düzce
- Population (2022): 947
- Time zone: UTC+3 (TRT)

Günbaşı is a village in the Düzce District of Düzce Province in Turkey. Its population is 947 (2022).
