= Samandere, Düzce =

Village in Turkey

Samandere
- Village
- Location in Turkey
- Coordinates: 40°42′N 31°16′E
- Country: Turkey
- Province: Düzce
- District: Düzce
- Population (2022): 391
- Time zone: UTC+3 (TRT)

Samandere is a village in the Düzce District of Düzce Province in Turkey. Its population is 391 (2022).
