= Yeniyurt, Kaynaşlı =

Village in Turkey

Yeniyurt
- Village
- Country: Turkey
- Province: Düzce
- District: Kaynaşlı
- Population (2022): 305
- Time zone: UTC+3 (TRT)

Yeniyurt is a village in the Kaynaşlı District of Düzce Province in Turkey. Its population is 305 (2022).
