= Dokuzdeğirmen, Cumayeri =

Village in Turkey

Dokuzdeğirmen
- Village
- Location in Turkey
- Coordinates: 40.9105°N 30.9510°E
- Country: Turkey
- Province: Düzce
- District: Cumayeri
- Population (2022): 267
- Time zone: UTC+3 (TRT)

Dokuzdeğirmen is a village in the Cumayeri District of Düzce Province in Turkey. Its population is 267 (2022).
