= Hızardere, Çilimli =

Village in Turkey

Hızardere
- Village
- Location in Turkey
- Coordinates: 40°55′24″N 31°03′38″E
- Country: Turkey
- Province: Düzce
- District: Çilimli
- Population (2022): 216
- Time zone: UTC+3 (TRT)

Hızardere is a village in the Çilimli District of Düzce Province in Turkey. Its population is 216 (2022).
