= Altınpınar, Düzce =

Village in Turkey

Altınpınar
- Village
- Location in Turkey
- Coordinates: 40.8166°N 31.2459°E
- Country: Turkey
- Province: Düzce
- District: Düzce
- Population (2022): 522
- Time zone: UTC+3 (TRT)

Altınpınar is a village in the Düzce District of Düzce Province in Turkey. Its population is 522 (2022).
