= Kaledibi, Düzce =

Village in Turkey

Kaledibi
- Village
- Location within Turkey
- Coordinates: 40.769444°N 31.165556°E
- Country: Turkey
- Province: Düzce
- District: Düzce
- Population (2022): 119
- Time zone: UTC+3 (TRT)

Kaledibi is a village in the Düzce District of Düzce Province in Turkey. Its population is 119 (2022).
