= Döngelli, Çilimli =

Village in Turkey

Döngelli
- Village
- Country: Turkey
- Province: Düzce
- District: Çilimli
- Population (2022): 578
- Time zone: UTC+3 (TRT)

Döngelli is a village in the Çilimli District of Düzce Province in Turkey. Its population is 578 (2022).
