= Aydınpınar, Düzce =

Village in Turkey

Aydınpınar
- Village
- Location in Turkey
- Coordinates: 40.7589°N 31.1077°E
- Country: Turkey
- Province: Düzce
- District: Düzce
- Population (2022): 2,712
- Time zone: UTC+3 (TRT)

Aydınpınar is a village in the Düzce District of Düzce Province in Turkey. Its population is 2,712 (2022). The village has a primary- and a middle school.

The Aydınpınar National park with a waterfall is located near the village. A second waterfall was discovered in early 2021 and a walkpath to it was finished later that year.
