= Çamoluk, Kaynaşlı =

Village in Turkey

Çamoluk
- Village
- Location in Turkey
- Coordinates: 40.7452°N 31.2888°E
- Country: Turkey
- Province: Düzce
- District: Kaynaşlı
- Population (2022): 235
- Time zone: UTC+3 (TRT)

Çamoluk is a village in the Kaynaşlı District of Düzce Province in Turkey. Its population is 235 (2022).
