= Beyköy, Düzce =

Beyköy
- Municipality
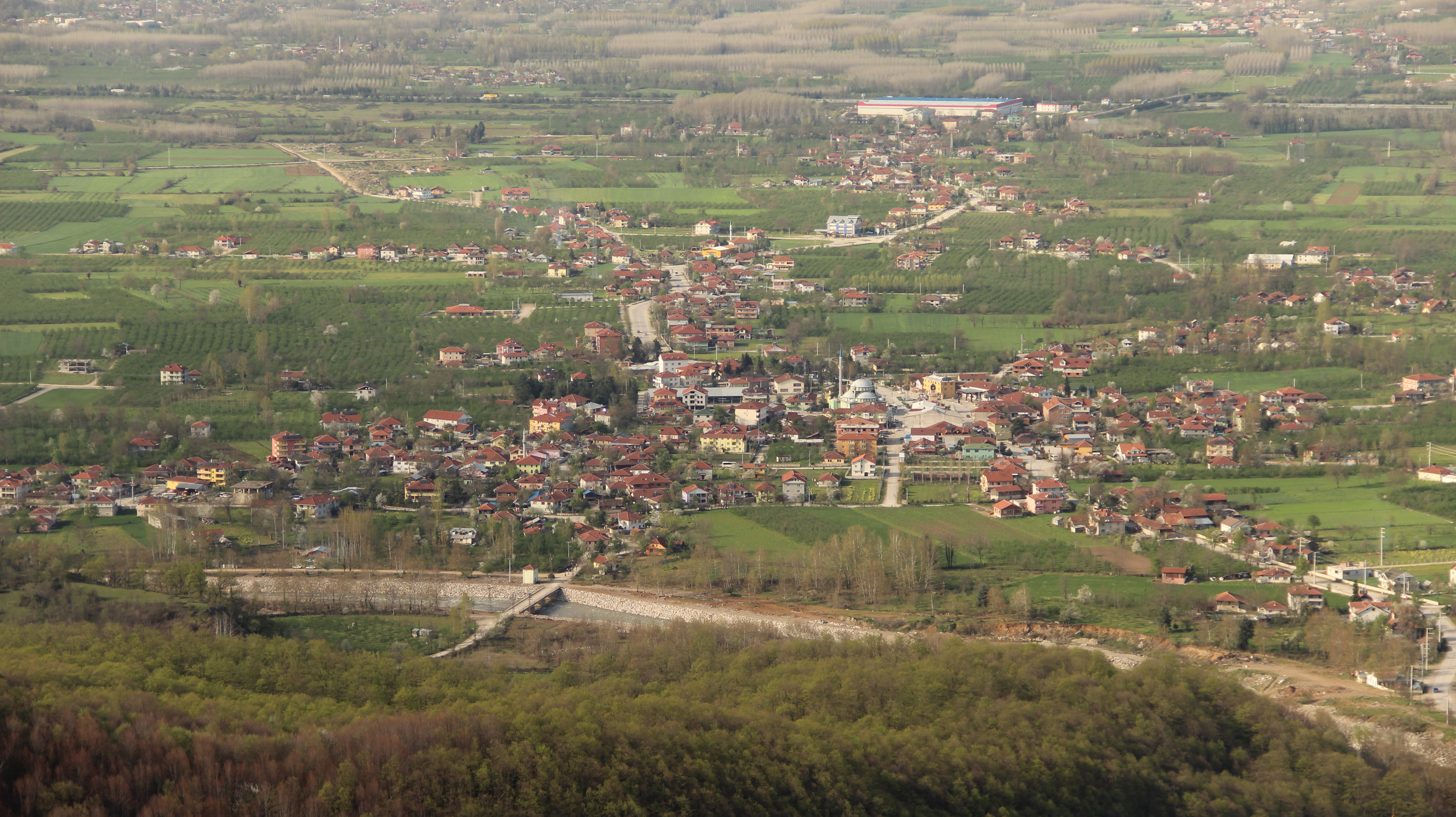

- Location within Turkey
- Coordinates: 40°46′N 31°10′E
- Country: Turkey
- Province: Düzce
- District: Düzce
- Elevation: 200 m (660 ft)
- Population (2022): 5,938
- Time zone: UTC+3 (TRT)
- Postal code: 81600
- Area code: 0380

Beyköy is a town (belde) in the Düzce District, Düzce Province, Turkey. Its population is 5,938 (2022). It is 7 kilometres (4.3 mi) South of Düzce. According to mayor's page the population of the town is mostly composed of refugees from Balkan countries and Caucasus as well as people from East Black Sea provinces of Turkey. In 1991 The settlement was declared a seat of township.
