= Düzce Province =

Coordinates: 40°56′49″N 31°14′17″E

Düzce Province Düzce ili
- Province
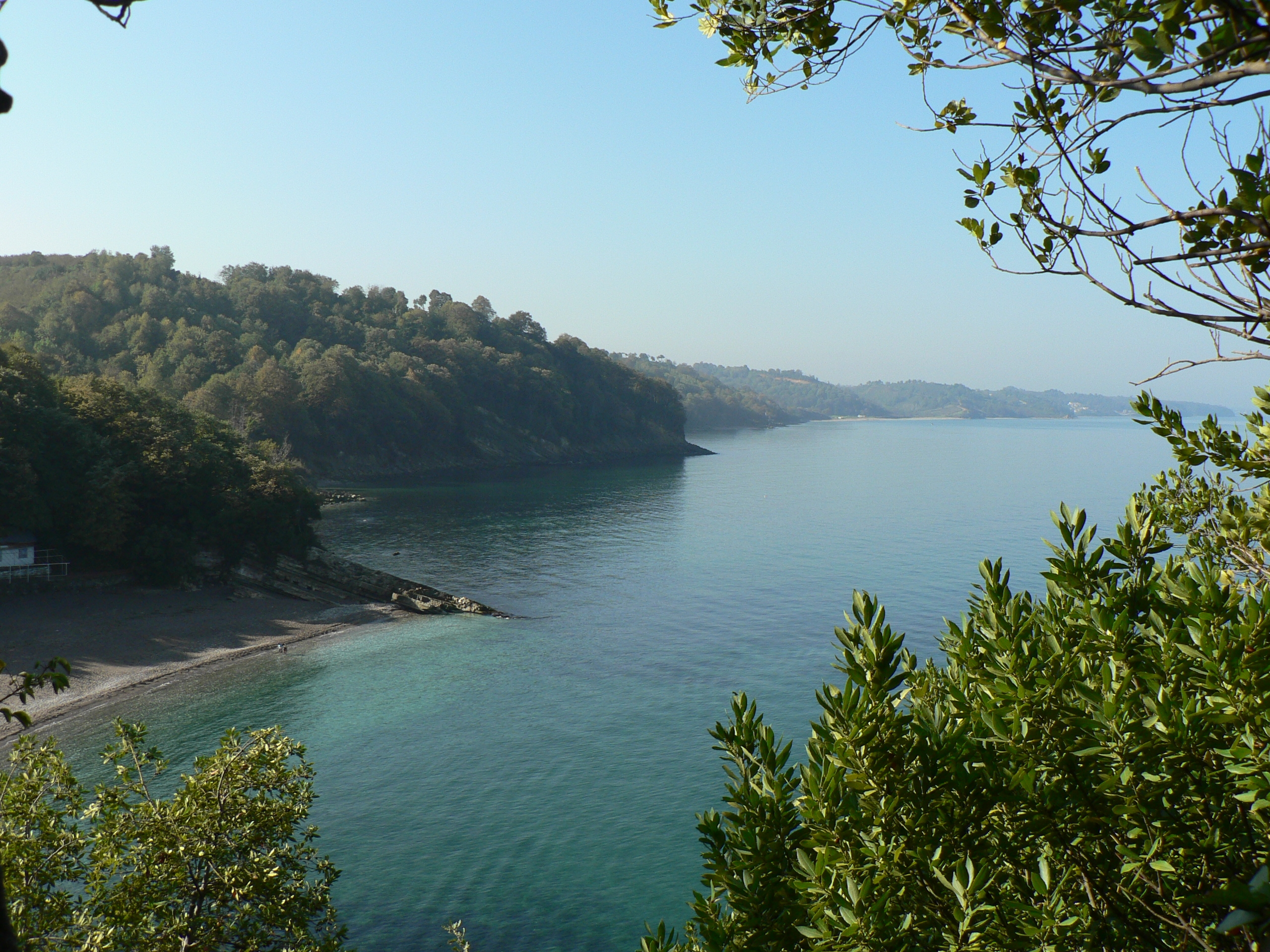
- Akçakoca Beach

- Location of the province within Turkey
- Country: Turkey
- Seat: Düzce

Government
  - Governor: Mehmet Makas
- Area: 2,492 km^{2} (962 sq mi)
- Population (2026): 415,622
  - Density: 166.8/km^{2} (432.0/sq mi)
- Time zone: UTC+3 (TRT)
- Area code: 0380
- Website: www.duzce.gov.tr

Düzce Province (Turkish: Düzce ili) is a province in northwestern Turkey. The province is on the coastline of the Black Sea and is traversed by the main highway between Istanbul and Ankara. The primary town is Düzce, located in the center of the province. Düzce separated from the Bolu province and became a province in its own right after a devastating earthquake in the city in November 1999. Its area is 2,492 km^{2}, and its population is 415.622 (2026).

== Districts ==
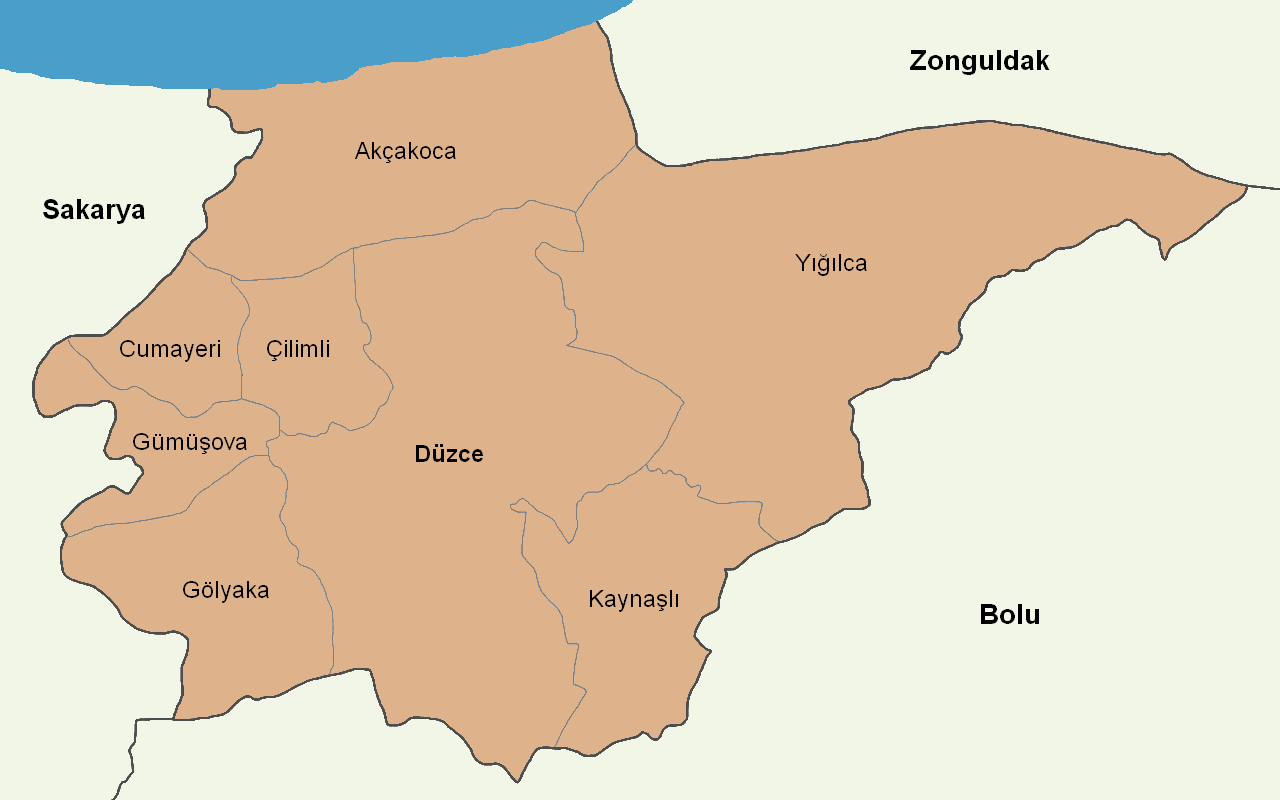

Düzce province is divided into 8 districts (capital district in bold):

- Akçakoca
- Çilimli
- Cumayeri
- **Düzce**
- Gölyaka
- Gümüşova
- Kaynaşlı
- Yığılca

== Health ==
Air pollution is a chronic problem in the province.

== Gallery ==
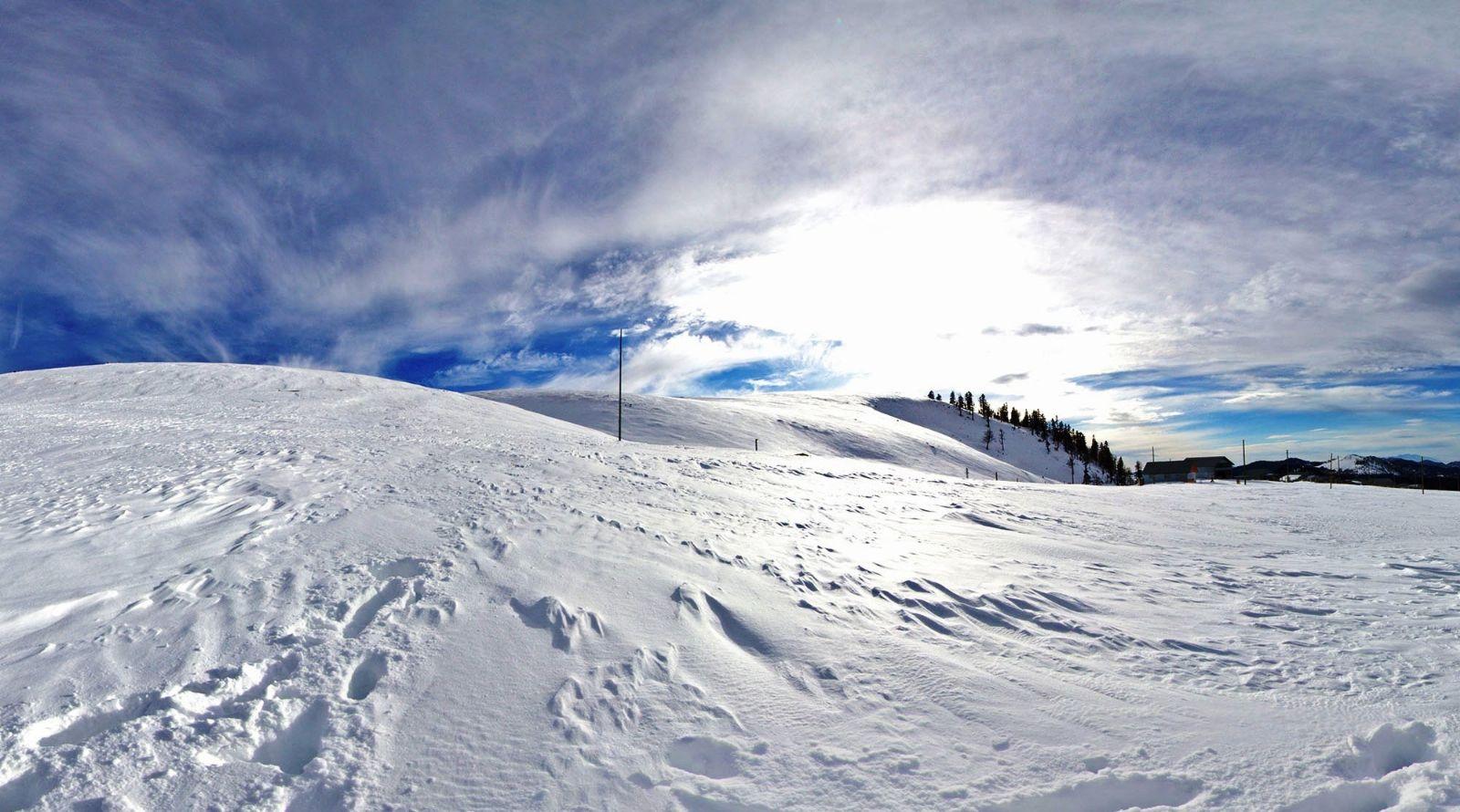
Kardüz Yaylası

== See also ==
- List of populated places in Düzce Province
