= Subaşı =

Subaşı may refer to:

- Subaşı, Akçakoca
- Subaşı, Cumayeri
- Subaşı, Edirne, a town in Meriç district of Edirne Province, Turkey
- Subaşı, Karacabey
- Subaşı, Kemaliye
- Subaşı, Lapseki
- Subaşı, Yalova, a town in Altınova district of Yalova Province, Turkey
- Subaşı, Sincik, a village in Sincik district of Adıyaman Provin, Turkey
- Subaşı, Gölbaşı, a village in Gölbaşı district of Ankara Province, Turkey
- Subaşı, Yapraklı
- Subaşı, Yenişehir, a village in Yenişehir district of Bursa Province, Turkey
- Subaşı (title), an Ottoman gubernatorial title
- Subaşı (surname), a Turkish-language surname
