= Paşalar =

Paşalar can refer to:

- Paşalar, Akçakoca
- Paşalar, Mustafakemalpaşa, Turkey
- Paşalar, Shusha, Azerbaijan
