= Kozdere =

Kozdere can refer to:

- Kozdere, Yenişehir
- Qozdərə
