= Koçar, Akçakoca =

Village in Turkey

Koçar
- Village
- Location in Turkey
- Coordinates: 41°01′50″N 31°06′11″E
- Country: Turkey
- Province: Düzce
- District: Akçakoca
- Population (2022): 171
- Time zone: UTC+3 (TRT)

Koçar is a village in the Akçakoca District of Düzce Province in Turkey. Its population is 171 (2022).

== History ==
The village has had the same name since 1831. While it was previously a neighborhood of Koçullu village, it gained village status by merging with the Belen neighborhood of the same village on September 12, 1958. The majority of the households that make up the population of the village are Yörükhan-Taifes (Yörüks) and immigrants from the East Black Sea region.
