= Kurukavak =

Kurukavak may refer to:

- Kurukavak, Akçakoca, in Düzce Province, Turkey
- Kurukavak, Beşiri, in Batman Province, Turkey
