= Beyören =

Beyören can refer to:

- Beyören, Akçakoca
- Beyören, Emirdağ
