= Akçakoca =

- Municipality
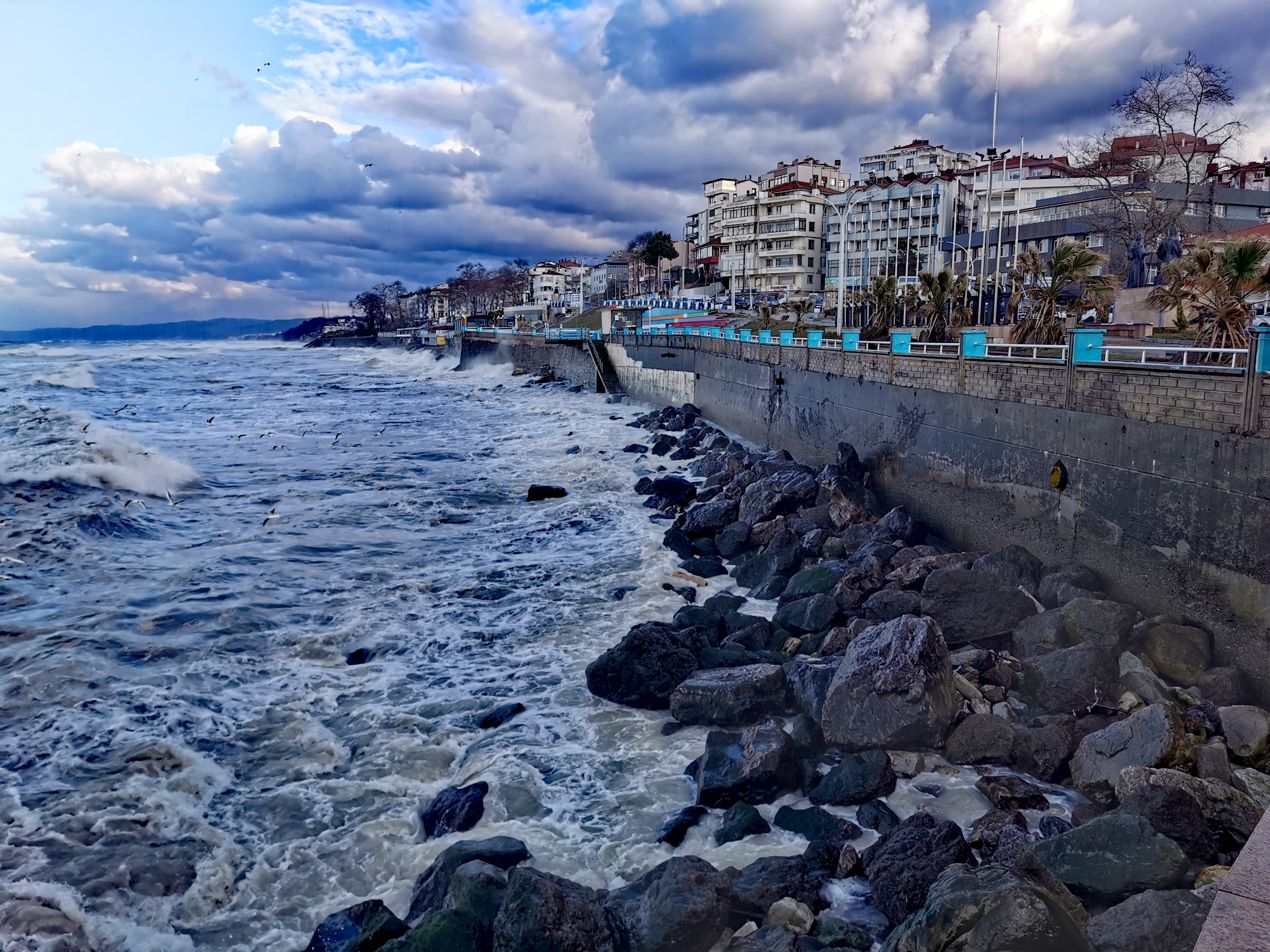
- Akçakoca beach

- Location within Turkey
- Coordinates: 41°05′16″N 31°07′28″E
- Country: Turkey
- Province: Düzce
- District: Akçakoca

Government
  - Mayor: Alev Ünal (AKP)
- Population (2022): 27,878
- Time zone: UTC+3 (TRT)
- Area code: 0380
- Climate: Cfa
- Website: www.akcakoca.bel.tr

Akçakoca is a town in Düzce Province, in the West Black Sea Region of Turkey, located about 200 km east of Istanbul. It is the seat of Akçakoca District. Its population is 27,878 (2022). The town was named after a Turkish chieftain of the 14th century CE who captured the area for the Ottoman Empire, and sports a statue in his honor. The town features a modern mosque of unusual design. Tourist attractions include beaches and a small ruined Genoese castle. It is the regional center of hazelnut cultivation.

== Name ==
In the classical period the town Dia or Diospolis was located at the site of present Akçakoca. After the Turkish conquest, the town was named Akçaşehir, which was changed to Akçakoca in 1934.

== Population ==
Akçakoca's estimated population of about 30,000 increases during the summer months, due to tourism activities and cottage owners. Due to war, specifically the one between the Ottomans and Russia in 1877–1878, a wide range of people, most of whom had roots in the Pontic region (Lazes, Georgians, and Abkhazians, Hamshenis, etc.) and from the Balkans (Albanians, Bosniaks, etc.), emigrated from their native lands to settle in Akçakoca.

Historical population
Year	Pop.	±% p.a.
2007	22,416	—
2012	23,359	+0.83%
2017	25,573	+1.83%
2022	27,878	+1.74%
Source: TÜIK (2007-2022)

== History ==
=== Latin-Nicea Empires Period and Genoese ===
During the Fourth Crusade, European armies conquered Constantinople in 1204, founding the Latin Empire for a short period. Because of this situation, the Genoese established commercial bases on the Western Black Sea coasts for their interests, which included a Genoese castle in Akçakoca. This castle helped to protect trade routes in the area and was used for commercial activities itself. When the Nicea Empire reconquered Constaninople in 1261, Akçakoca, which was under the auspices of the Nicea Empire, came under Byzantine rule again.

=== The Seljuks and Ottoman ===
Before the crusades, The Seljuk Sultanate of Rum controlled the region around Akçakoca.

There is no evidence that a military action was taken by the Ottomans to conquer Akçakoca from the Byzantines. According to some historians, the Turk population submitted to Ottoman rule without military action.

In the late 19th and early 20th century, Akçakoca was part of the Kastamonu Vilayet of the Ottoman Empire.

=== Republic ===
After the foundation of Turkish Republic, it was renamed Akçakoca. The first governor was Ali Zarifi (Okay). Due to the 1999 Düzce and Marmara earthquakes, Düzce had been declared a province by the government, and the town was included in the new province as a district.

== Climate ==
Akçakoca has a humid subtropical climate (Köppen: Cfa).

Climate data for Akçakoca (1991–2020)
Month	Jan	Feb	Mar	Apr	May	Jun	Jul	Aug	Sep	Oct	Nov	Dec	Year
Mean daily maximum °C (°F)	9.6 (49.3)	10.0 (50.0)	11.9 (53.4)	15.2 (59.4)	19.7 (67.5)	24.4 (75.9)	27.0 (80.6)	27.4 (81.3)	24.2 (75.6)	20.1 (68.2)	15.6 (60.1)	11.8 (53.2)	18.1 (64.6)
Daily mean °C (°F)	5.5 (41.9)	5.8 (42.4)	7.5 (45.5)	10.7 (51.3)	15.2 (59.4)	19.7 (67.5)	22.2 (72.0)	22.6 (72.7)	19.1 (66.4)	15.1 (59.2)	10.6 (51.1)	7.4 (45.3)	13.5 (56.3)
Mean daily minimum °C (°F)	2.0 (35.6)	2.1 (35.8)	3.6 (38.5)	6.5 (43.7)	10.7 (51.3)	14.6 (58.3)	17.0 (62.6)	17.6 (63.7)	14.3 (57.7)	10.9 (51.6)	6.4 (43.5)	3.7 (38.7)	9.1 (48.4)
Average precipitation mm (inches)	125.32 (4.93)	89.24 (3.51)	90.34 (3.56)	57.98 (2.28)	55.9 (2.20)	80.96 (3.19)	66.41 (2.61)	81.28 (3.20)	107.43 (4.23)	140.34 (5.53)	112.01 (4.41)	151.13 (5.95)	1,158.34 (45.60)
Average precipitation days (≥ 1.0 mm)	13.2	11.1	10.8	8.5	7.3	6.5	4.8	5.0	6.6	9.7	9.6	13.4	106.5
Average relative humidity (%)	82.3	82.1	82.3	83.9	85.1	83.6	83.3	83.6	83.4	85.5	83.8	81.8	83.3
Mean monthly sunshine hours	67.2	82.1	116.0	157.1	200.5	264.4	305.1	293.1	219.8	146.2	102.4	69.4	1,929.8
Source: NOAA

== Economy ==
=== Tourism ===
After the 1950s, touristic activities in summer seasons attained an important place in Akçakoca's economy. The construction of tourism facilities and new transportation improvements further influenced tourism in the late-1970's.

==== Water sports ====
Numerous water sports such as sailing, swimming, water skiing, sunbathing, fishing, scuba diving, are performed in Akçakoca. Sailing and diving have become more prominent in the last few years. In 2010, sailing races have been held as part of the 14th Akçakoca Festival. Furthermore, the first Marine and Sailing Club in the town was opened in town in 2012.

=== Heavy industry ===
Akçakoca has one large factory, which produces large pipes for a variety of purposes. It has great importance both Akçakoca and Ereğli. Akçakoca also has only natural gas platform over the Black Sea. There are four platforms which three of them are small and one is big.

=== Fishing ===
Fishing is traditional job in Akçakoca. Anchovies, nonita, bluefish, whiting, red mullet, clams, jack mackerel, sea bass, salmon, trout, and turbot are some of fish that can be found.

=== Government ===
One governor's office and one municipality building can be found in Akçakoca. It has one state hospital, one rest home and a small tourism office for tourists.

=== Construction ===
There is an attractive mosque what built in 2004. Akçakoca Central Mosque was built in a similar fashion to Faisal Mosque in Pakistan. The mosque was designed by Ergün Subaşı. This highly irregular mosque was placed above 160 concrete poles driven into the ground. The dome height is 31 meters and covered by 32 tons of copper plates. And the chandelier that resembles the dome in reverse weigh around 1300 kg. The rocket like minarets are at 58 meters in height.

== Culture ==
=== Festivals ===
There is a traditional hazelnut festival every July which celebrates the town's most prevalent product grown, harvested and sold by the locals. During the festival, scheduled buses from neighbour towns and cities, such as Ereğli, Düzce, Zonguldak, Bolu and Adapazarı carry visitors to Akçakoca.

=== Languages ===
Georgian, Laz, Armenian (Homshetsi dialect), Bosnian, Albanian and Circassian, Abkhazian are spoken by its Akçakoca people as well as Turkish. Native Turks of Akçakoca are Manavs.

=== Dances and Music ===
Because of the presence of many residents originally from the eastern Black Sea littoral, 'Horon', played with the Pontic lyra/kemençe are popular here.

== Damage to Historical and Natural Heritage ==
Tourism activities in Akçakoca rely on short summer tourism, also depending on beach tourism, also referred to as sea-sand-sun tourism. Prior to 1945, Akçakoca had a wider and longer coastline. The beach extended from Cuhallı to the rocks on the western side (today there is a five-star hotel called Skytower) and continued until the castle beach below Geonavise Castle. However, road construction, cafes, restaurants, hotels, and residential buildings have made the beach narrower and shorter on the Cuhallı side. In the center of Akçakoca, there used to be a large and beautiful beach, which was part of Cuhallı Beach, but now there is a harbor for fishermen. Many locals attribute the construction of the harbor, formed by piling concrete and rocks, to the discomfort felt by conservative elements towards people swimming and walking in swimsuits and shorts.

In Akçakoca, there are many wooden houses in neighborhoods such as Yukarı Mahalle, Cumhuriyet Mahallesi, and Orhangazi. The government has declared these areas as protected sites. As a result, no one can claim ownership of these houses, not even their owners can intervene for repairs and use. Most of these houses are collapsing, and some are damaged by fire because it is illegal to make any changes in the area. However, the government has yet to take action regarding these houses and areas. Consequently, they are quietly awaiting their fate.

== Gallery ==
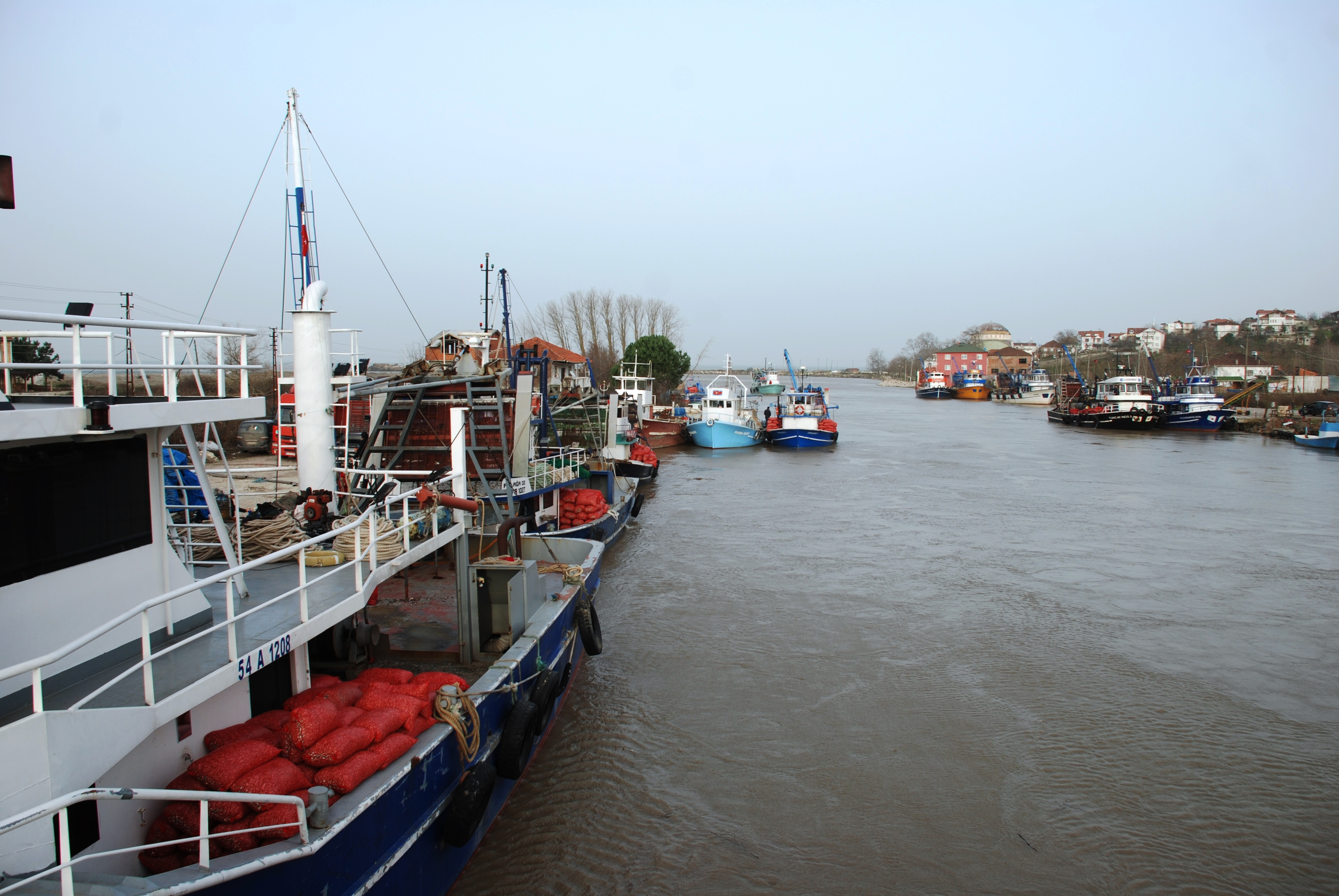
Melen Creek

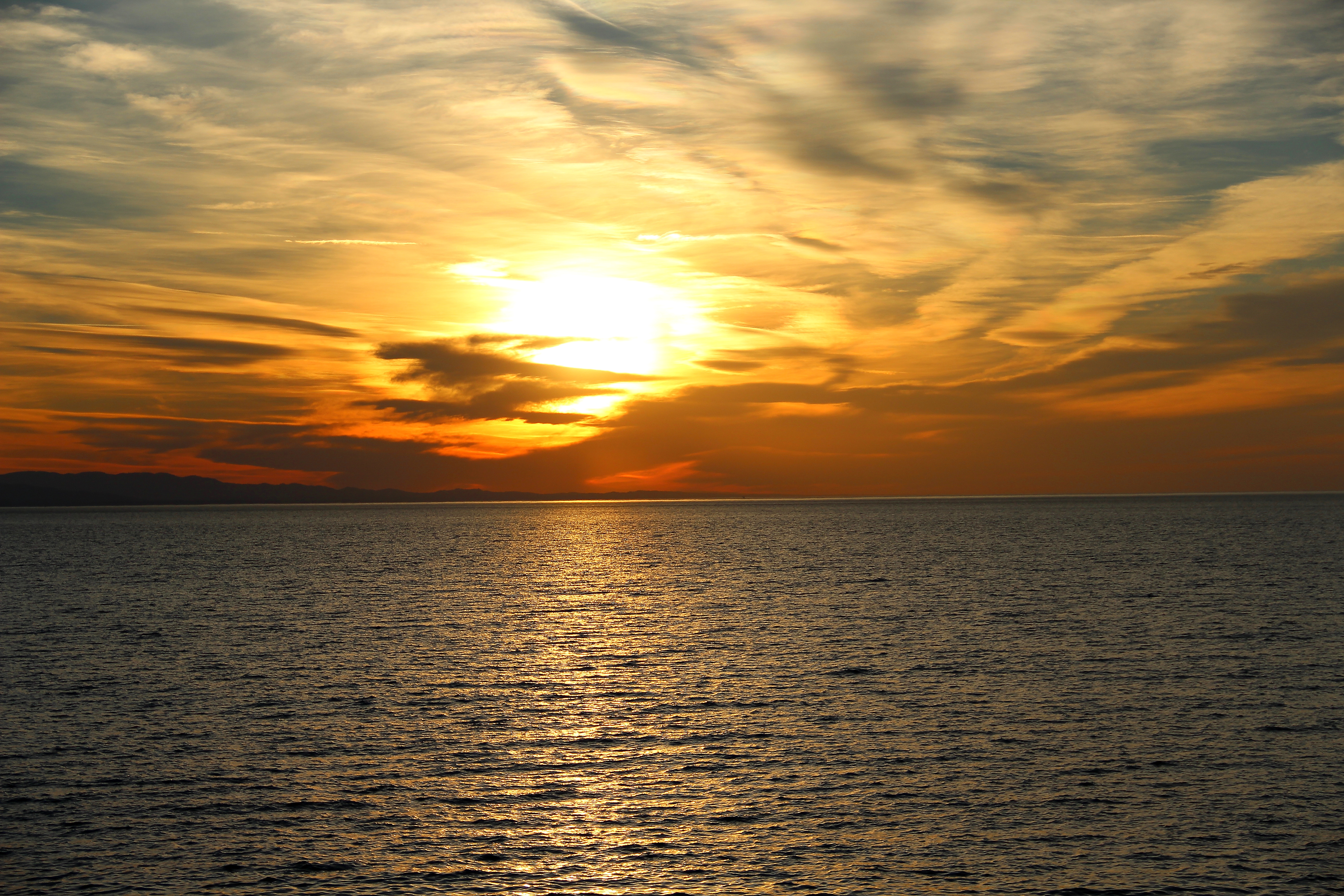

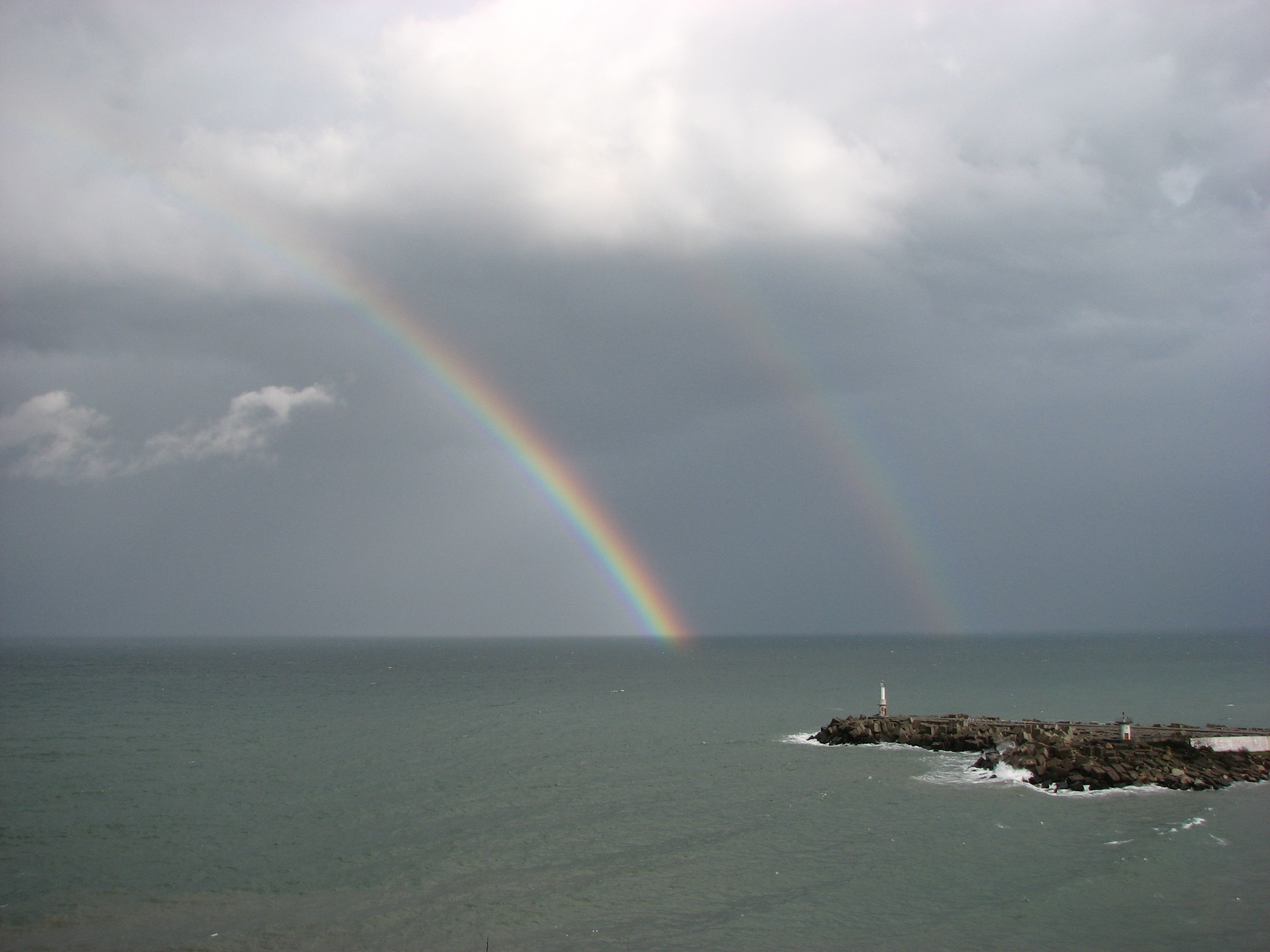

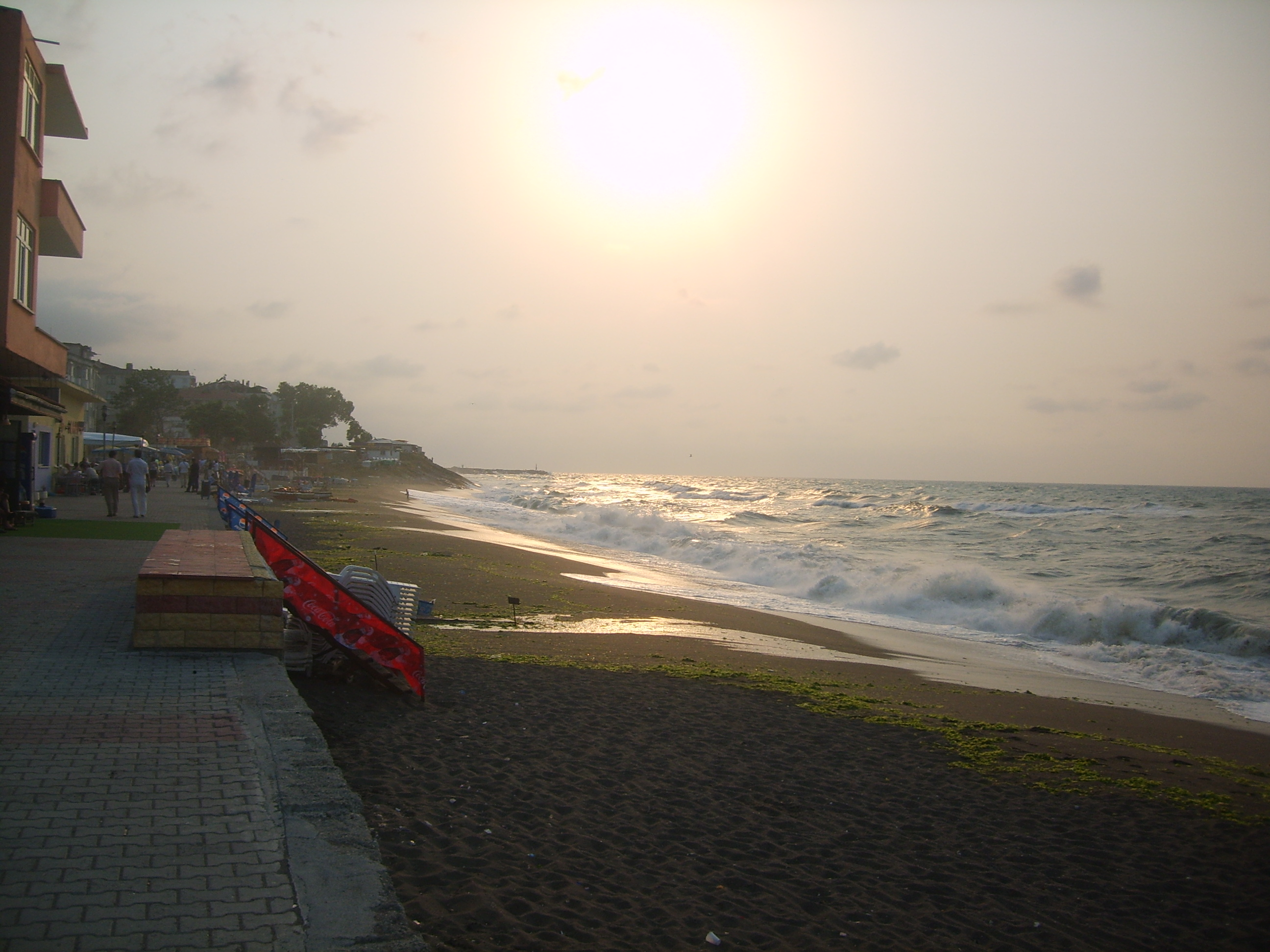
Autumn in Akçakoca

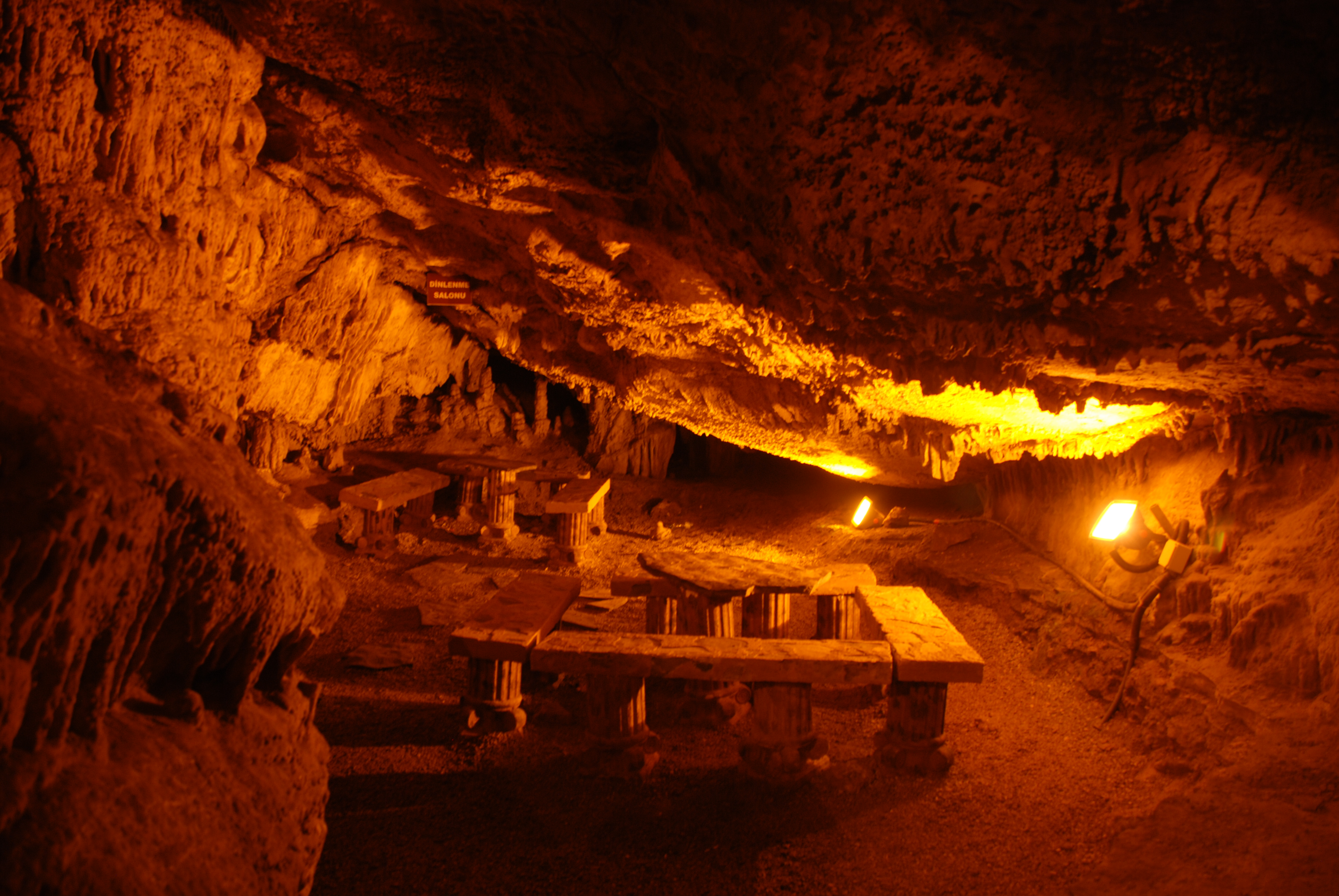
Fakıllı Cave

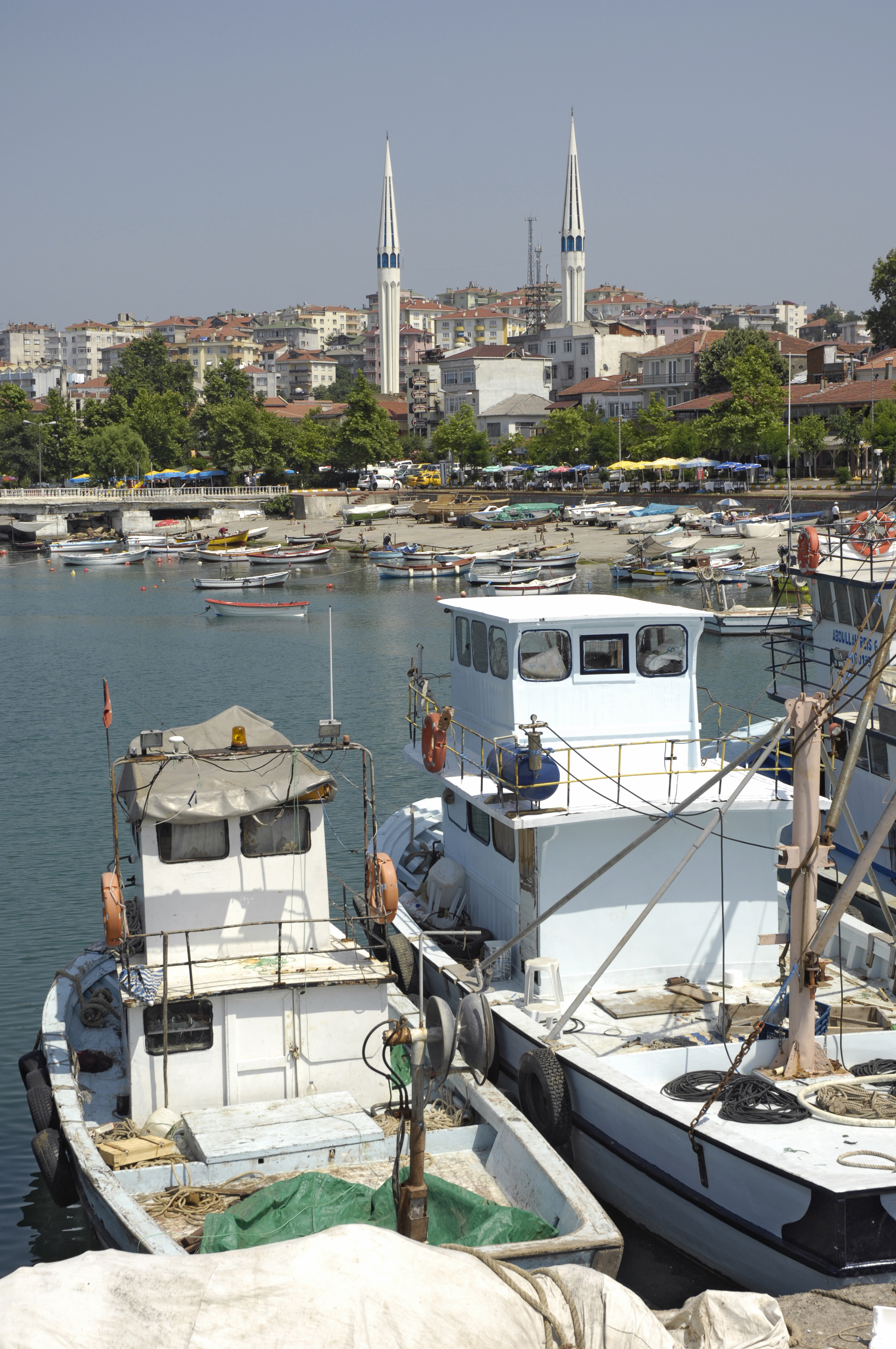

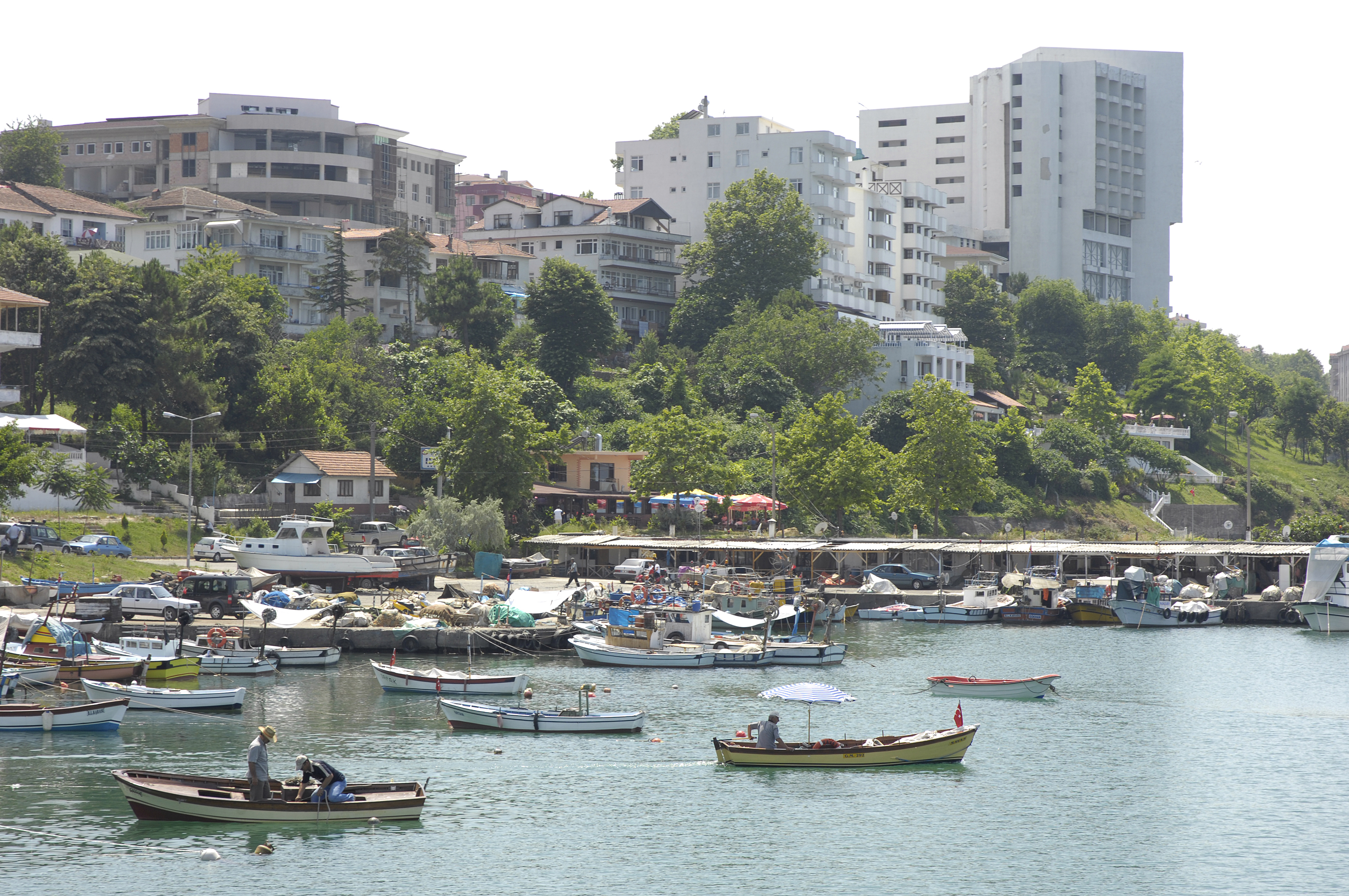

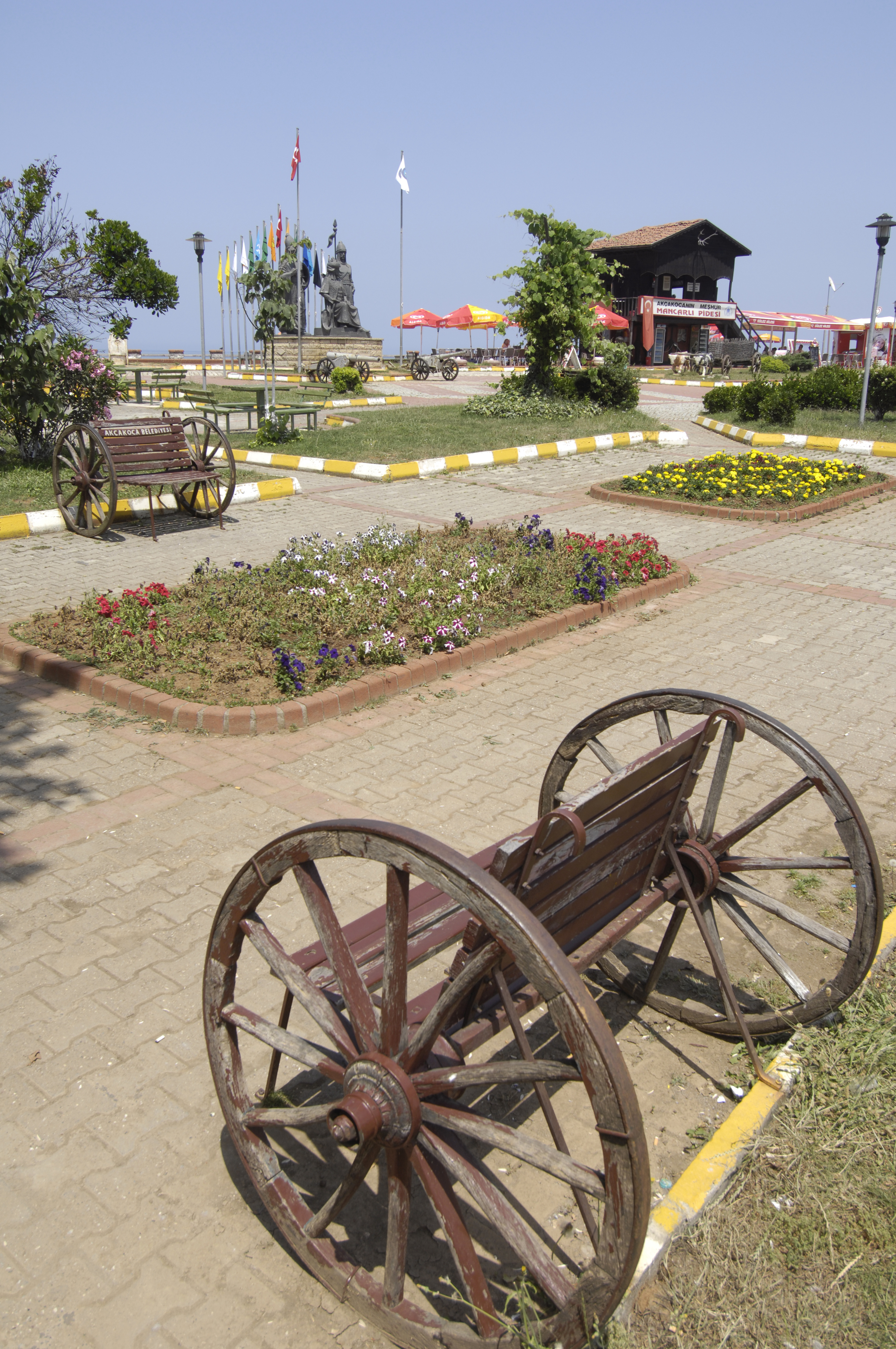

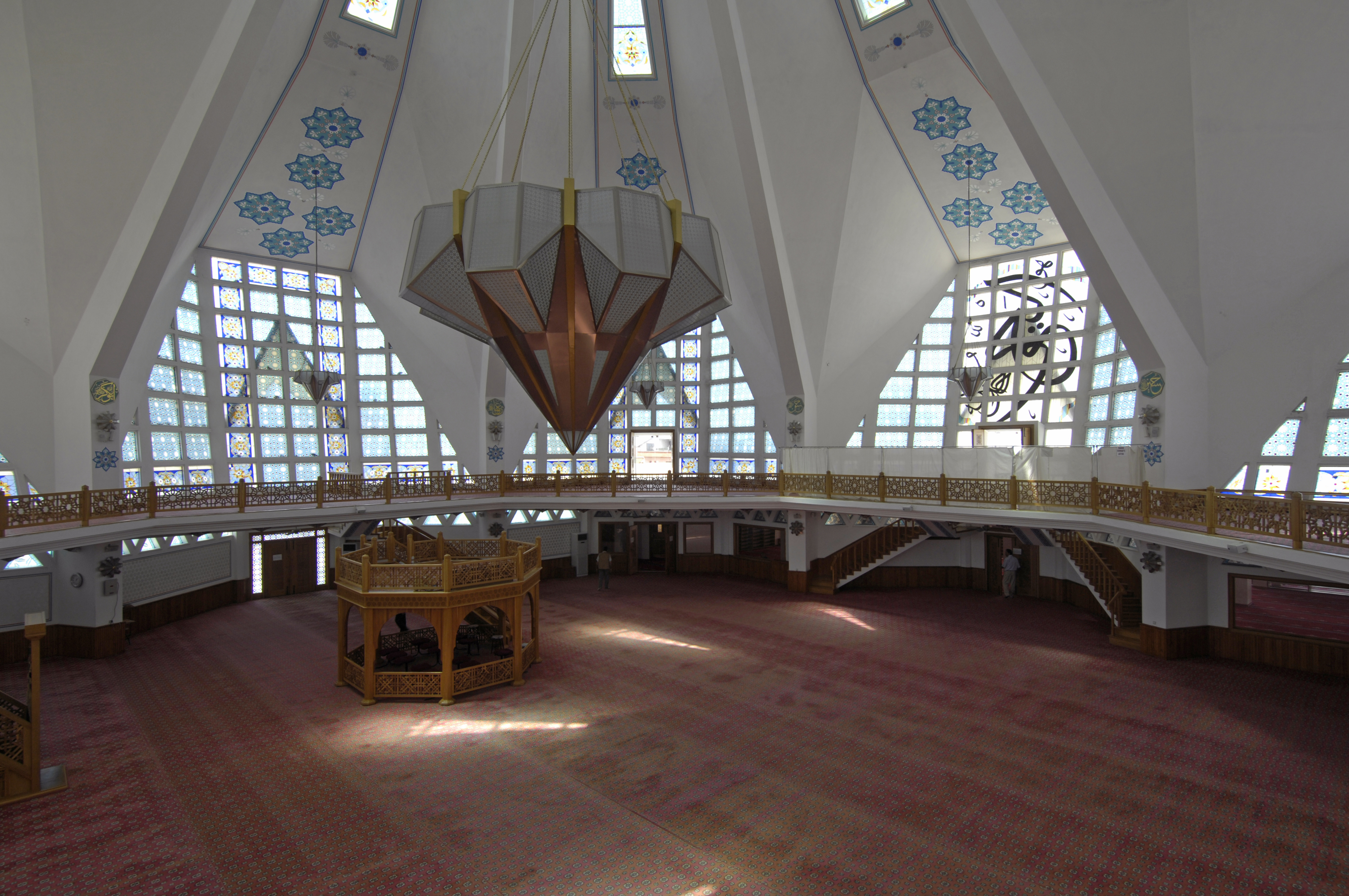

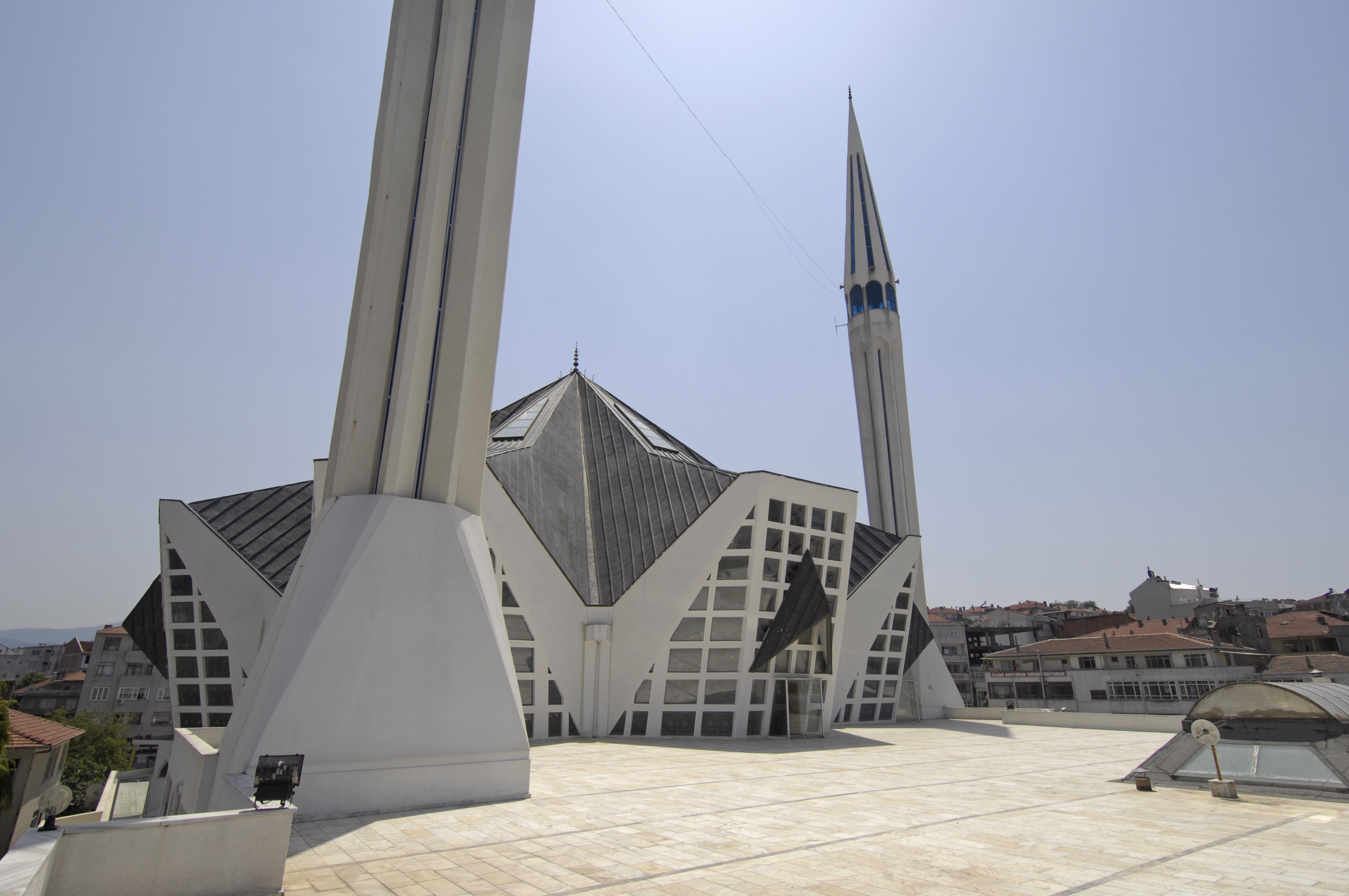
Akcakoca Merkez Camii
