= Ortanca =

Ortanca can refer to:

- Ortanca, Akçakoca
- Ortanca, Kahta
