= Dilaver =

Dilaver is a given name. Notable people with the name include:

== Given name ==
- Dilaver Pasha (died 1622), Ottoman statesman
- Dilaver Satılmış (born 1979), Swiss football player
- Dilaver Zrnanović (born 1984), Bosnian footballer currently playing for Sloboda Tuzla
- Dilaver "Dilly" Duka (born 1989), American footballer currently playing for Montreal Impact

== Surname ==
- Anıl Dilaver (born 1990), Turkish footballer
- Emir Dilaver (born 1991), Bosnian footballer
- Haris Dilaver (born 1990), Bosnian footballer

== Places ==
- Dilaver, Akçakoca

== See also ==
- Dilawar (disambiguation), further information
