= Kelesa =

Ancient town

Coordinates: 41°06′00″N 31°12′54″E

Kelesa was a coastal town of ancient Bithynia on the Black Sea inhabited during Roman times. Its name does not occur in ancient authors, but is inferred from epigraphic and other evidence.

Its site is located near Akkaya in Asiatic Turkey.
