= Aktaş, Akçakoca =

Village in Turkey

Aktaş
- Village
- Location within Turkey
- Coordinates: 41.0327°N 31.0645°E
- Country: Turkey
- Province: Düzce
- District: Akçakoca
- Population (2022): 163
- Time zone: UTC+3 (TRT)

Aktaş is a village in the Akçakoca District of Düzce Province in Turkey. Its population is 163 (2022).

== History ==
The name of the village is mentioned as Gebekilise in the records of 1568 and 1928. The old name of Aktaş village, known as an old Manav village, is Gebekilise. After the Russo-Ottoman 1877-1878 War, a significant Laz population came to the village from Hopa and Kemalpaşa districts. It is known that the community living in the village and called Manav are the descendants of the Cuman-Kipchaks, who were settled in a planned manner by the Nicea Emperor İoannes (John) Vatatzes, as mentioned.
