= Sarıyayla =

Sarıyayla can refer to:

- Sarıyayla, Akçakoca
- Sarıyayla, Sason
