= Nazımbey, Akçakoca =

Village in Turkey

Nazımbey
- Village
- Country: Turkey
- Province: Düzce
- District: Akçakoca
- Population (2022): 121
- Time zone: UTC+3 (TRT)

Nazımbey is a village in the Akçakoca District of Düzce Province in Turkey. Its population is 121 (2022).
