= Demirboğa, Yenişehir =

Village in Turkey

Demirboğa
- Neighbourhood
- Country: Turkey
- Province: Bursa
- District: Yenişehir
- Population (2022): 220
- Time zone: UTC+3 (TRT)

Demirboğa is a neighbourhood in the municipality and district of Yenişehir, Bursa Province in Turkey. Its population is 220 (2022).
