= Kurugöl, Akçakoca =

Village in Turkey

Kurugöl
- Village
- Location in Turkey
- Coordinates: 41°0′53″N 31°5′22″E
- Country: Turkey
- Province: Düzce
- District: Akçakoca
- Population (2022): 433
- Time zone: UTC+3 (TRT)

Kurugöl is a village in the Akçakoca District of Düzce Province in Turkey. Its population is 433 (2022).
