= Alaylı, Yenişehir =

Village in Turkey

Alaylı
- Neighbourhood
- Location in Turkey Alaylı (Marmara)
- Coordinates: 40.3051°N 29.6806°E
- Country: Turkey
- Province: Bursa
- District: Yenişehir
- Population (2022): 182
- Time zone: UTC+3 (TRT)

Alaylı is a neighbourhood in the municipality and district of Yenişehir, Bursa Province in Turkey. Its population is 182 (2022).
