= Göktepe, Akçakoca =

Village in Turkey

Göktepe
- Village
- Location in Turkey
- Coordinates: 41.0573°N 31.1100°E
- Country: Turkey
- Province: Düzce
- District: Akçakoca
- Population (2022): 141
- Time zone: UTC+3 (TRT)

Göktepe is a village in the Akçakoca District of Düzce Province in Turkey. Its population is 141 (2022).
