= Çayağzı, Akçakoca =

Village in Turkey

Çayağzı
- Village
- Country: Turkey
- Province: Düzce
- District: Akçakoca
- Population (2022): 582
- Time zone: UTC+3 (TRT)

Çayağzı is a village in the Akçakoca District of Düzce Province in Turkey. Its population is 582 (2022).
