= Burcun, Yenişehir =

Village in Turkey

Burcun
- Neighbourhood
- Location in Turkey Burcun (Marmara)
- Coordinates: 40°20′N 29°25′E
- Country: Turkey
- Province: Bursa
- District: Yenişehir
- Population (2022): 195
- Time zone: UTC+3 (TRT)

Burcun is a neighbourhood in the municipality and district of Yenişehir, Bursa Province in Turkey. Its population is 195 (2022).
