= Altunçay, Akçakoca =

Village in Turkey

Altunçay
- Village
- Location in Turkey
- Coordinates: 41.0145°N 31.2497°E
- Country: Turkey
- Province: Düzce
- District: Akçakoca
- Population (2022): 475
- Time zone: UTC+3 (TRT)

Altunçay (also: Altınçay) is a village in the Akçakoca District of Düzce Province in Turkey. Its population is 475 (2022).
