= Kıblepınar, Yenişehir =

Village in Turkey

Kıblepınar
- Neighbourhood
- Location in Turkey Kıblepınar (Marmara)
- Coordinates: 40°21′N 29°28′E
- Country: Turkey
- Province: Bursa
- District: Yenişehir
- Population (2022): 50
- Time zone: UTC+3 (TRT)

Kıblepınar is a neighbourhood in the municipality and district of Yenişehir, Bursa Province, Turkey. Its population is 50 (2022).
