= Yıldırım, Yenişehir =

Village in Turkey

Yıldırım
- Neighbourhood
- Country: Turkey
- Province: Bursa
- District: Yenişehir
- Population (2022): 115
- Time zone: UTC+3 (TRT)

Yıldırım is a neighbourhood in the municipality and district of Yenişehir, Bursa Province in Turkey. Its population is 115 as of 2022.
