= Kızılhisar, Yenişehir =

Village in Turkey

Kızılhisar
- Neighbourhood
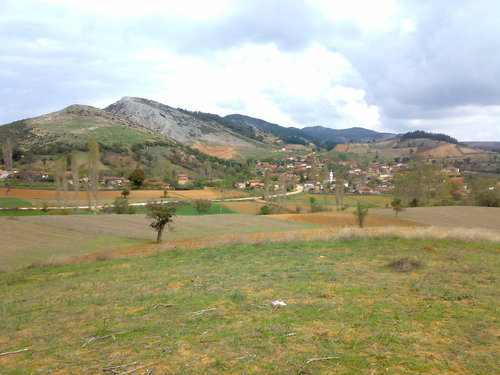

- Location within Turkey Location within Marmara
- Country: Turkey
- Province: Bursa
- District: Yenişehir
- Population (2022): 235
- Time zone: UTC+3 (TRT)

Kızılhisar, is a neighbourhood in the municipality and district of Yenişehir, Bursa Province in Turkey. Its population is 235 (2022).

== History ==
The village was named after the color of the earth, and the ruined castle of the village. The village's history dates back to approximately 15th century.

== Culture ==
On religious or public holidays, young girls in the village gather around the old oak tree, whose age is estimated to be around 500, and celebrate by singing songs. Furthermore, every year on the first Sunday of June, a fair is being held. Tarhana, fried meat and popara can be considered as the noted foods of the village.

== Geography ==
The village is about 72 km away from Bursa city center, and 17 km away from Yenişehir city center. In the high hills of the village, a glimpse of Lake Iznik can be caught.

== Climate ==
The climate of the village can be defined as typical Mediterranean climate.

== Economy ==
The economy of the village depends greatly on agriculture. Mainly, onion, beans, tomato, pepper, wheat, barley, plum, peach, melon, watermelon and grapes are cultivated in the village.

== Muhtars of the village ==
The muhtars of the village are shown below.

2014	Osman Ak
2009	Salih Çolak
1999	Mehmet Dasal
1994	Bekir Köse
