= Barcın, Yenişehir =

Village in Turkey

Barcın
- Neighbourhood
- Location in Turkey Barcın (Marmara)
- Coordinates: 40.3013°N 29.6088°E
- Country: Turkey
- Province: Bursa
- District: Yenişehir
- Population (2022): 413
- Time zone: UTC+3 (TRT)

Barcın is a neighbourhood in the municipality and district of Yenişehir, Bursa Province in Turkey. Its population is 413 (2022).
