= Deredibi, Akçakoca =

Village in Turkey

Deredibi
- Village
- Location in Turkey
- Coordinates: 41°01′17″N 31°11′20″E
- Country: Turkey
- Province: Düzce
- District: Akçakoca
- Population (2022): 256
- Time zone: UTC+3 (TRT)

Deredibi is a village in the Akçakoca District of Düzce Province in Turkey. Its population is 256 (2022).
