= Çamönü, Yenişehir =

Village in Turkey

Çamönü
- Neighbourhood
- Location in Turkey Çamönü (Marmara)
- Coordinates: 40°15′18″N 29°46′12″E
- Country: Turkey
- Province: Bursa
- District: Yenişehir
- Population (2022): 216
- Time zone: UTC+3 (TRT)

Çamönü is a neighbourhood in the municipality and district of Yenişehir, Bursa Province in Turkey. Its population is 216 (2022).
