= Balatlı, Akçakoca =

Village in Turkey

Balatlı
- Village
- Location in Turkey
- Coordinates: 41.0346°N 31.1596°E
- Country: Turkey
- Province: Düzce
- District: Akçakoca
- Population (2022): 479
- Time zone: UTC+3 (TRT)

Balatlı is a village in the Akçakoca District of Düzce Province in Turkey. Its population is 479 (2022).
