= Toprakocak, Yenişehir =

Village in Turkey

Toprakocak
- Neighbourhood
- Location in Turkey Toprakocak (Marmara)
- Coordinates: 40°17′N 29°30′E
- Country: Turkey
- Province: Bursa
- District: Yenişehir
- Population (2022): 178
- Time zone: UTC+3 (TRT)

Toprakocak is a neighbourhood in the municipality and district of Yenişehir, Bursa Province in Turkey. Its population is 178 (2022).
