= Arabacı, Akçakoca =

Village in Turkey

Arabacı
- Village
- Location in Turkey
- Coordinates: 41.0447°N 31.0870°E
- Country: Turkey
- Province: Düzce
- District: Akçakoca
- Population (2022): 280
- Time zone: UTC+3 (TRT)

Arabacı is a village in the Akçakoca District of Düzce Province in Turkey. Its population is 280 (2022).
