= Ayaz, Yenişehir =

Village in Turkey

Ayaz
- Neighbourhood
- Location in Turkey Ayaz (Marmara)
- Coordinates: 40.2044°N 29.5741°E
- Country: Turkey
- Province: Bursa
- District: Yenişehir
- Population (2022): 192
- Time zone: UTC+3 (TRT)

Ayaz is a neighbourhood in the municipality and district of Yenişehir, Bursa Province in Turkey. Its population is 192 (2022).
