= Tepeköy, Akçakoca =

Village in Turkey

Tepeköy
- Village
- Country: Turkey
- Province: Düzce
- District: Akçakoca
- Population (2022): 696
- Time zone: UTC+3 (TRT)

Tepeköy is a village in the Akçakoca District of Düzce Province in Turkey. Its population is 696 (2022).
