= Akçakoca Castle =

Castle in Akçakoca, Düzce, Turkey

Coordinates: 41.0861°N 31.0928°E

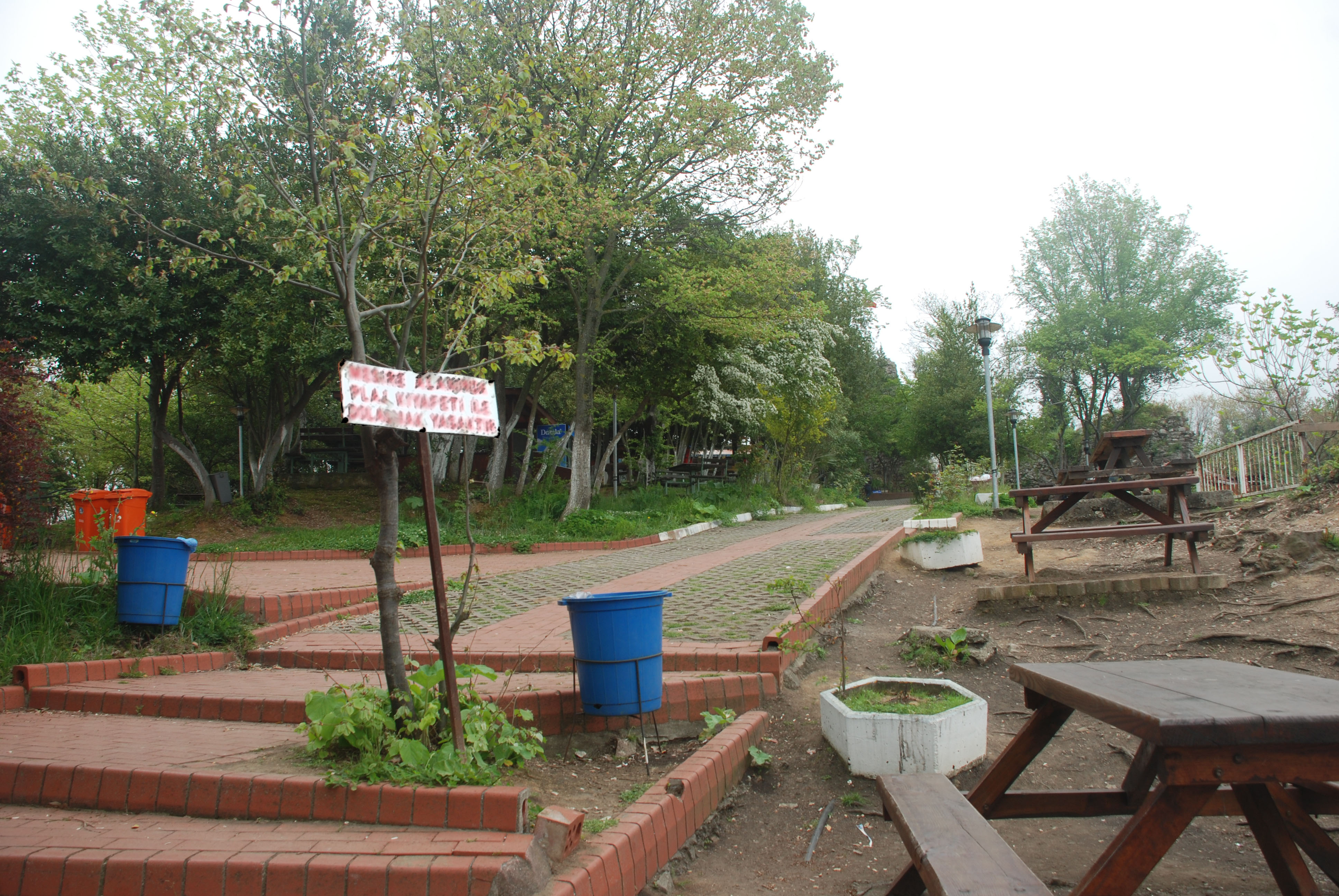
- Interactive map of Akçakoca Castle

Akçakoca Castle, also known as the Genoese Castle, is a castle built on a cliff located between two bays, 2.5 kilometers west of Akçakoca, Düzce, Turkey. To the south of the castle, in the east and west directions, a high tower rises in the middle of the walls and a water cistern exists in the inner courtyard. The bricks and mortar used in the castle show similarities with the bricks and mortar used in other Genoese castles.

The Genoese Castle and its surroundings have survived from the Hellenistic, Roman and Eastern Roman periods. It has been registered as an archaeological and natural site with the decision of the Ankara Cultural and Natural Heritage Preservation Board, and is listed in the UNESCO World Heritage Tentative List with the theme "Castles and Walled Settlements on the Genoese Trade Route from the Mediterranean to the Black Sea".

As a result of the Fourth Crusade, Istanbul was captured by the Crusaders and the Latin Empire was established. The castle was built between 1204 and 1261 by the Latins, who also dominated the Black Sea coast, or by the Nicea Empire, which ruled in the region in the same period. The historical castle is popularly called the Genoese Castle. It is thought that the castle was built or repaired for commercial purposes. At that time, the city of Diapolis (Akçakoca) was an important coastal town and a commercially and strategically important town. It is thought that after the construction of the castle, some Christian refugees of Turkic origin in the Balkans were settled in the town of Diapolis (Akçakoca) for security purposes.

Akçakoca Castle is surrounded by two separate Blue Flag beaches to the east and west. One of the beaches, called Yalıyarlar, is known as seal reefs because it contains caves along the coast and attracts attention. The Castle is the most preferred picnic and recreation area of Akçakoca.
