= Çardak, Yenişehir =

Village in Turkey

Çardak
- Neighbourhood
- Location in Turkey Çardak (Marmara)
- Coordinates: 40.2547°N 29.5280°E
- Country: Turkey
- Province: Bursa
- District: Yenişehir
- Population (2022): 254
- Time zone: UTC+3 (TRT)

Çardak is a neighbourhood in the municipality and district of Yenişehir, Bursa Province in Turkey. Its population is 254 (2022).
