= Akçapınar, Yenişehir =

Village in Turkey

Akçapınar
- Neighbourhood
- Location in Turkey Akçapınar (Marmara)
- Coordinates: 40.1685°N 29.5777°E
- Country: Turkey
- Province: Bursa
- District: Yenişehir
- Population (2022): 431
- Time zone: UTC+3 (TRT)

Akçapınar is a neighbourhood in the municipality and district of Yenişehir, Bursa Province in Turkey. Its population is 431 (2022).
