= Akdere, Yenişehir =

Village in Turkey

Akdere
- Neighbourhood
- Location in Turkey Akdere (Marmara)
- Coordinates: 40.2490°N 29.6960°E
- Country: Turkey
- Province: Bursa
- District: Yenişehir
- Population (2022): 138
- Time zone: UTC+3 (TRT)

Akdere is a neighbourhood in the municipality and district of Yenişehir, Bursa Province in Turkey. Its population is 138 (2022).
