= Hemşin, Akçakoca =

Village in Turkey

Hemşin
- Village
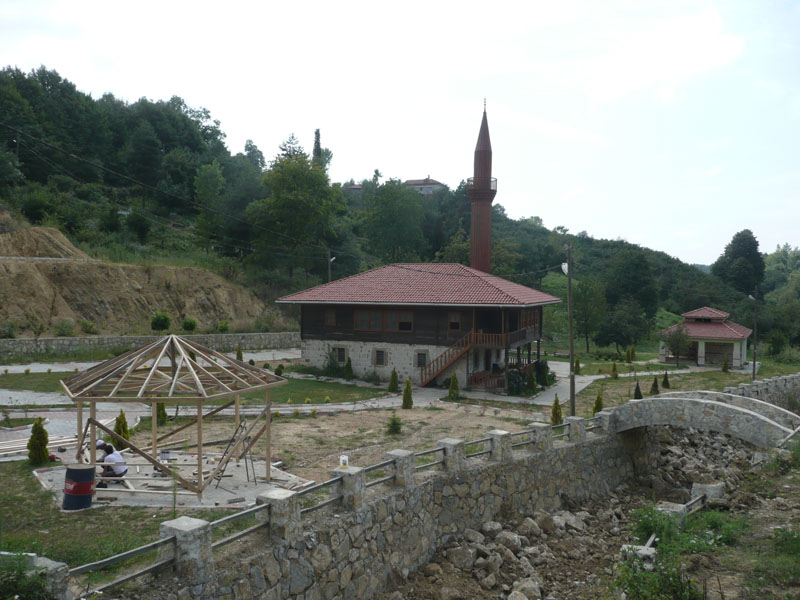

- Location within Turkey
- Country: Turkey
- Province: Düzce
- District: Akçakoca
- Population (2022): 186
- Time zone: UTC+3 (TRT)

Hemşin is a village in the Akçakoca District of Düzce Province in Turkey. Its population is 186 (2022).
