= Tahirli, Akçakoca =

Village in Turkey

Tahirli
- Village
- Location in Turkey
- Coordinates: 41°03′29″N 31°04′05″E
- Country: Turkey
- Province: Düzce
- District: Akçakoca
- Population (2022): 137
- Time zone: UTC+3 (TRT)

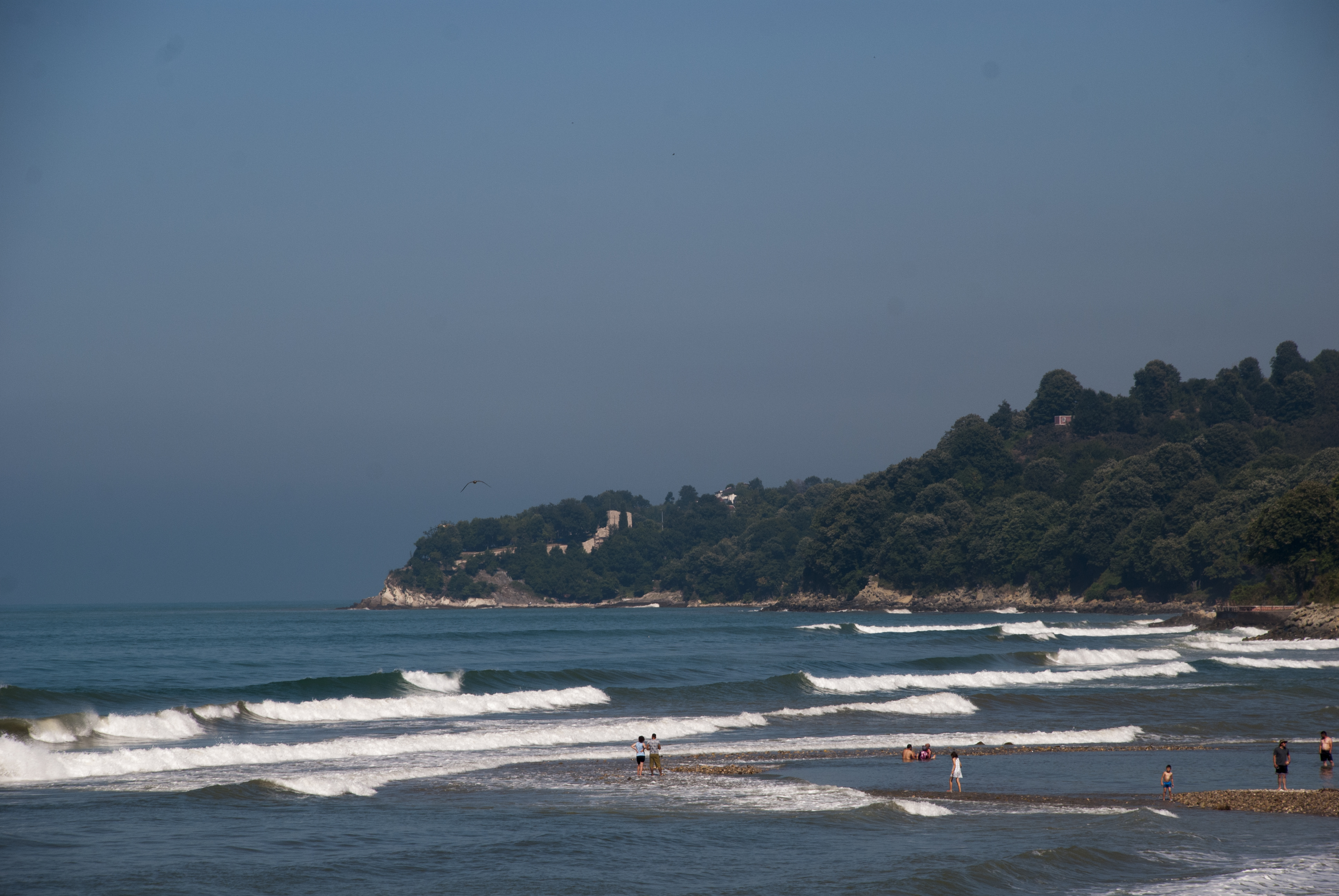
View from Tahirli beach

Tahirli is a village in the Akçakoca District of Düzce Province in Turkey. Its population is 137 (2022).
