= Melenağzı, Akçakoca =

Village in Turkey

Melenağzı
- Village
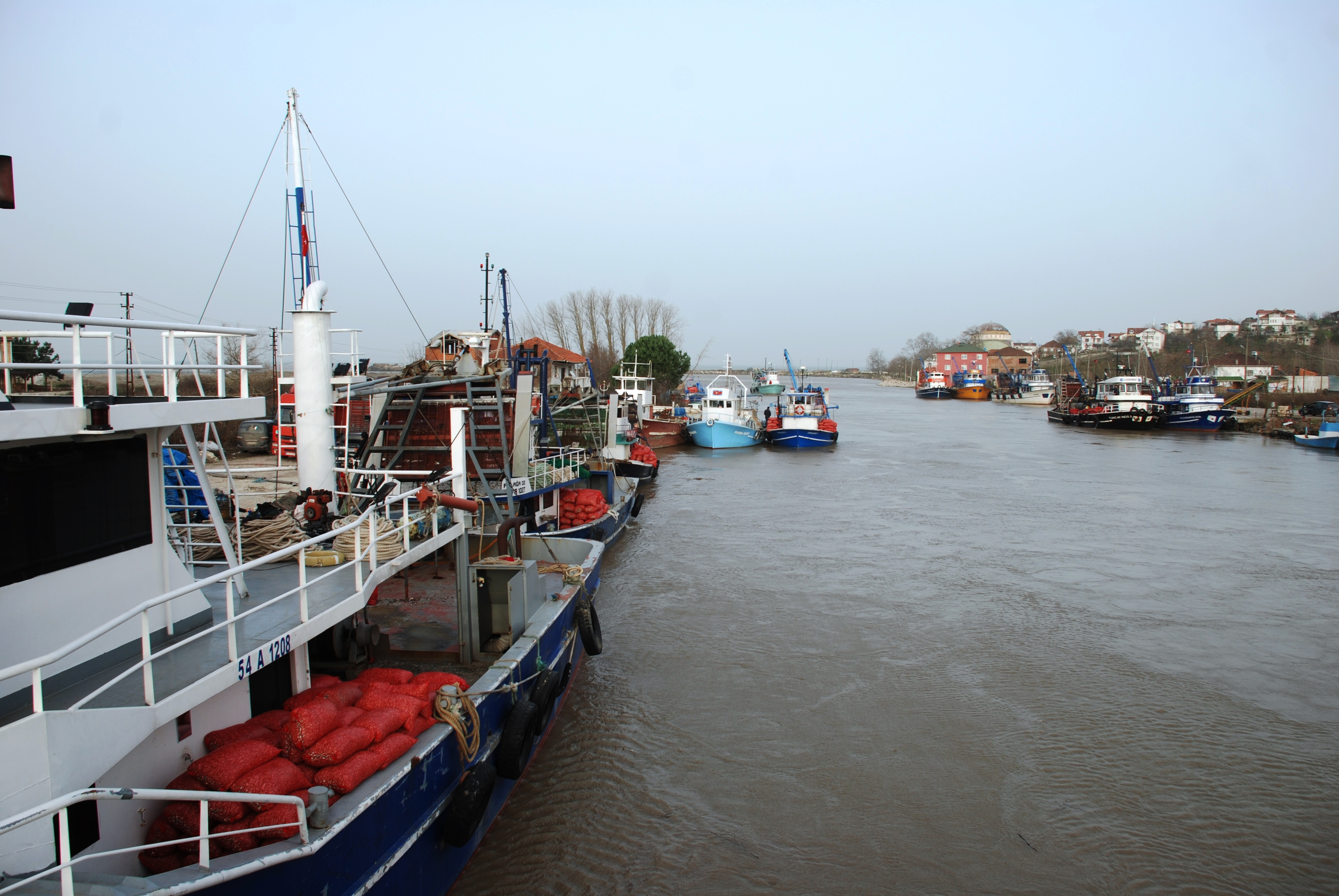
- A harbor

- Location within Turkey
- Coordinates: 41°04′N 30°58′E
- Country: Turkey
- Province: Düzce
- District: Akçakoca
- Population (2022): 483
- Time zone: UTC+3 (TRT)

Melenağzı is a village in the Akçakoca District of Düzce Province in Turkey. Its population is 483 (2022).
