= Akçakoca District =

District of Düzce Province, Turkey

- District
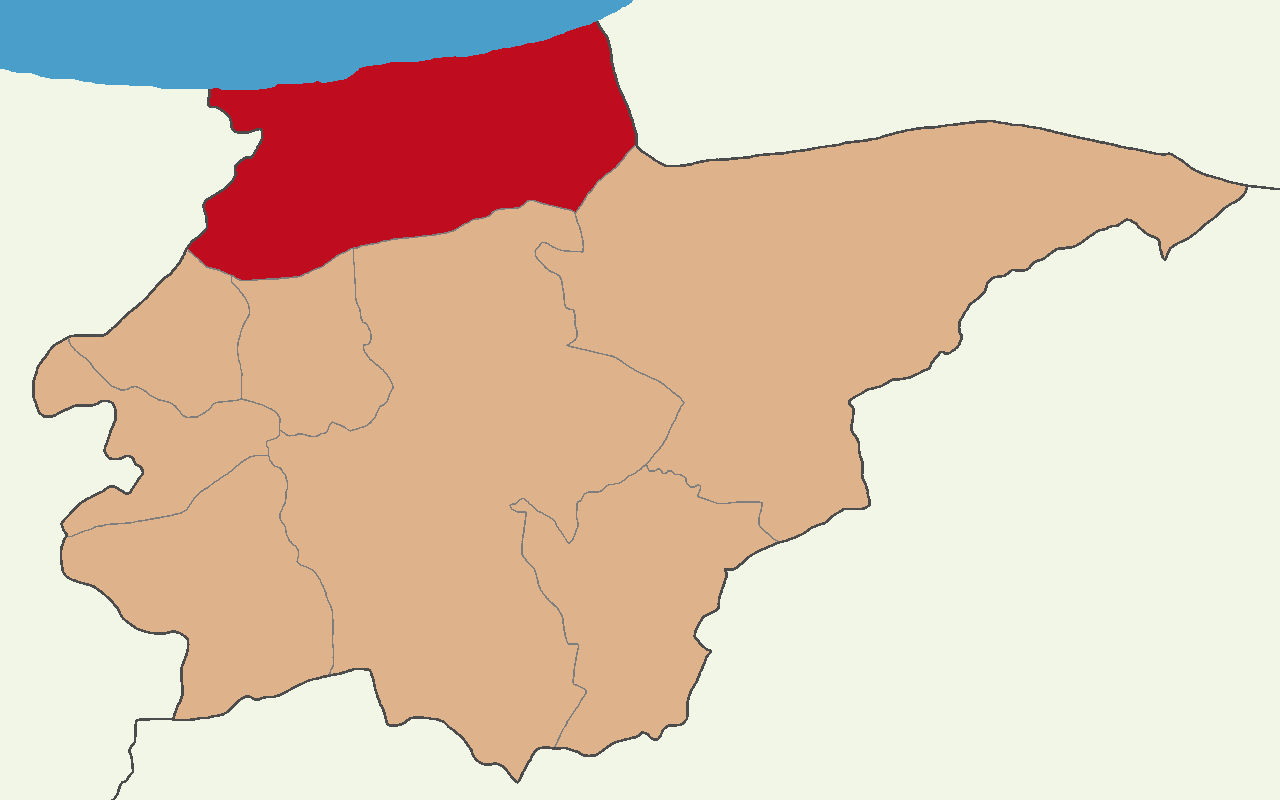
- Map showing Akçakoca District in Düzce Province

- Location within Turkey
- Coordinates: 41°2′N 31°7′E
- Country: Turkey
- Province: Düzce
- Seat: Akçakoca

Government
  - Kaymakam: Fikret Albayrak (CHP)
- Area: 380 km^{2} (150 sq mi)
- Population (2022): 40,025
  - Density: 110/km^{2} (270/sq mi)
- Time zone: UTC+3 (TRT)
- Website: www.akcakoca.gov.tr

Akçakoca District is a district of the Düzce Province of Turkey. Its seat is the town of Akçakoca. Its area is 380 km^{2}, and its population is 40,025 (2022).

== Composition ==
There is one municipality in Akçakoca District:

- Akçakoca

There are 43 villages in Akçakoca District:

- Akkaya
- Aktaş
- Altunçay
- Arabacı
- Balatlı
- Beyhanlı
- Beyören
- Çayağzı
- Çiçekpınar
- Dadalı
- Davutağa
- Deredibi
- Dereköy
- Dilaver
- Doğancılar
- Döngelli
- Edilli
- Esmahanım
- Fakıllı
- Göktepe
- Hasançavuş
- Hemşin
- Kalkın
- Karatavuk
- Kepenç
- Kınık
- Kirazlı
- Koçar
- Koçullu
- Küpler
- Kurugöl
- Kurukavak
- Melenağzı
- Nazımbey
- Ortanca
- Paşalar
- Sarıyayla
- Subaşı
- Tahirli
- Tepeköy
- Uğurlu
- Yenice
- Yeşilköy

== Population ==
Population
Year	Total	Town	Villages
1997	37,644	20,398	17,246
2007	36,944	22,416	14,528
2012	37,216	23,359	13,857
2017	37,924	25,573	12,351
2022	40,025	27,878	12,147
Sources: 1997 census and TÜIK (2007-2022)
