= Uğurlu, Akçakoca =

Village in Turkey

Uğurlu
- Village
- Location in Turkey
- Coordinates: 41°01′29″N 30°59′33″E
- Country: Turkey
- Province: Düzce
- District: Akçakoca
- Population (2022): 499
- Time zone: UTC+3 (TRT)

Uğurlu is a village in the Akçakoca District of Düzce Province in Turkey. Its population is 499 (2022).
