= Reşadiye, Yenişehir =

Village in Turkey

Reşadiye
- Neighbourhood
- Country: Turkey
- Province: Bursa
- District: Yenişehir
- Population (2022): 89
- Time zone: UTC+3 (TRT)

Reşadiye is a neighbourhood in the municipality and district of Yenişehir, Bursa Province in Turkey. Its population is 89 (2022).
