= Fethiye, Yenişehir =

Village in Turkey

Fethiye
- Neighbourhood
- Location in Turkey Fethiye (Marmara)
- Coordinates: 40°17′20″N 29°26′46″E
- Country: Turkey
- Province: Bursa
- District: Yenişehir
- Population (2022): 230
- Time zone: UTC+3 (TRT)

Fethiye is a neighbourhood in the municipality and district of Yenişehir, Bursa Province in Turkey. Its population is 230 (2022).
