= Çelebi, Yenişehir =

Village in Bursa Province, Turkey

Çelebi
- Neighbourhood
- Country: Turkey
- Province: Bursa
- District: Yenişehir
- Population (2022): 659
- Time zone: UTC+3 (TRT)

Çelebi is a neighbourhood in the municipality and district of Yenişehir, Bursa Province in Turkey. Its population is 659 (2022).
