= Kalkın, Akçakoca =

Village in Turkey

Kalkın
- Village
- Location in Turkey
- Coordinates: 41.055556°N 31.048333°E
- Country: Turkey
- Province: Düzce
- District: Akçakoca
- Population (2022): 257
- Time zone: UTC+3 (TRT)

Kalkın is a village in the Akçakoca District of Düzce Province in Turkey. Its population is 257 (2022).
