= Akbıyık, Yenişehir =

Village in Turkey

Akbıyık
- Neighbourhood
- Location in Turkey Akbıyık (Marmara)
- Coordinates: 40.1419°N 29.6632°E
- Country: Turkey
- Province: Bursa
- District: Yenişehir
- Population (2022): 248
- Time zone: UTC+3 (TRT)

Akbıyık is a neighbourhood in the municipality and district of Yenişehir, Bursa Province in Turkey. Its population is 248 (2022).
