= Koçullu, Akçakoca =

Village in Turkey

Koçullu
- Village
- Country: Turkey
- Province: Düzce
- District: Akçakoca
- Population (2022): 149
- Time zone: UTC+3 (TRT)

Koçullu is a village in the Akçakoca District of Düzce Province in Turkey. Its population is 149 (2022).

== History ==
It is known that the community living in the village and called Manav are the descendants of the Cuman-Kipchaks, who were settled in a planned manner by the Nicea Emperor İoannes (John) Vatatzes, as mentioned.
