= Fakıllı, Akçakoca =

Village in Turkey

Fakıllı
- Village
- Country: Turkey
- Province: Düzce
- District: Akçakoca
- Population (2022): 293
- Time zone: UTC+3 (TRT)

Fakıllı is a village in the Akçakoca District of Düzce Province in Turkey. Its population is 293 (2022).
