= Beyhanlı, Akçakoca =

Village in Turkey

Beyhanlı
- Village
- Location in Turkey
- Coordinates: 41.0935°N 31.2388°E
- Country: Turkey
- Province: Düzce
- District: Akçakoca
- Population (2022): 201
- Time zone: UTC+3 (TRT)

Beyhanlı (also: Bayhanlı) is a village in the Akçakoca District of Düzce Province in Turkey. Its population is 201 (2022).
