= Yenişehir, Bursa =

Yenişehir
- District and municipality
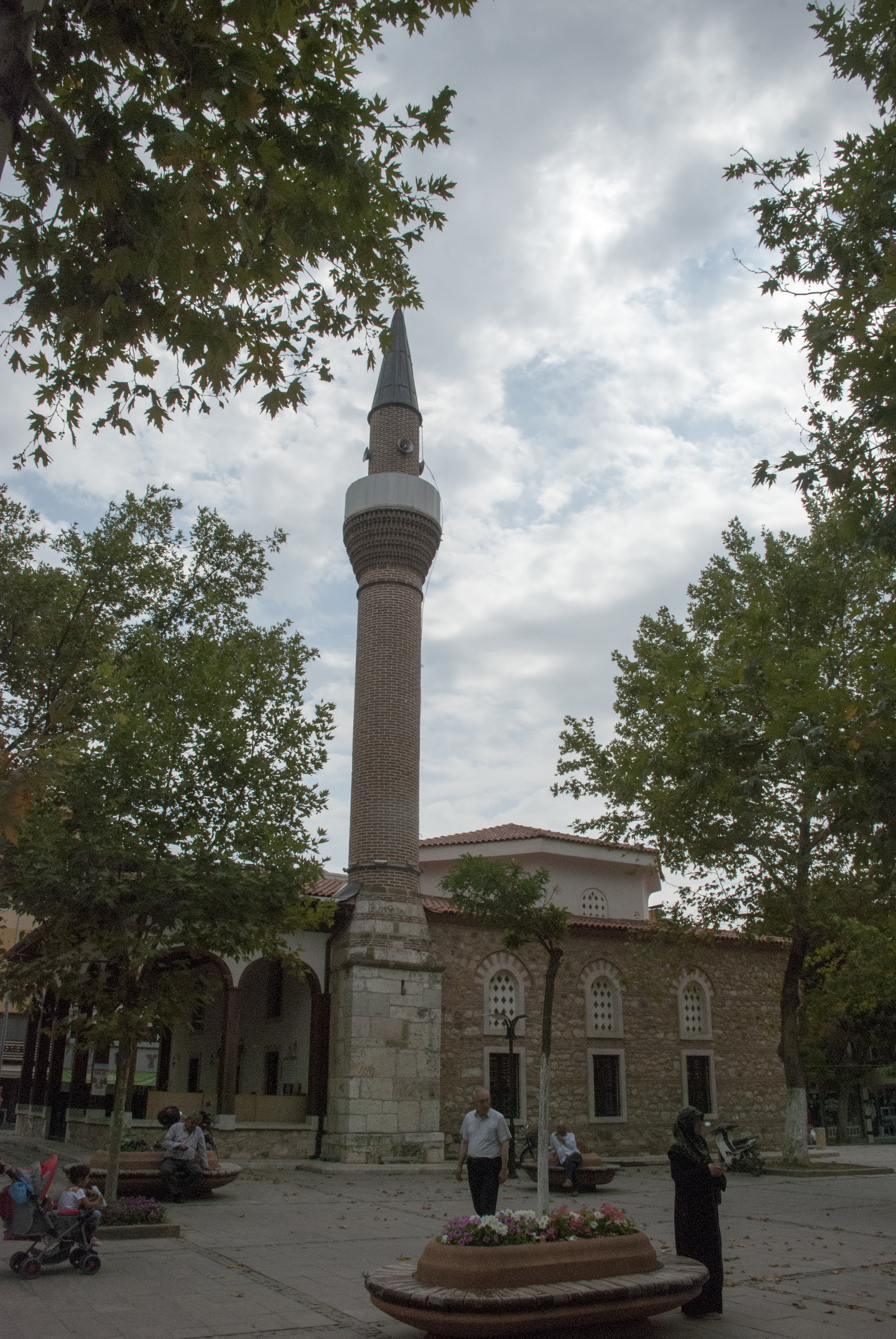

- Map showing Yenişehir District in Bursa Province

- Location within Turkey Location within Marmara
- Coordinates: 40°15′52″N 29°39′11″E
- Country: Turkey
- Province: Bursa

Government
  - Mayor: Ercan Özel (AK Party)
- Area: 720 km^{2} (280 sq mi)
- Population (2022): 54,844
  - Density: 76/km^{2} (200/sq mi)
- Time zone: UTC+3 (TRT)
- Area code: 0224
- Website: www.bursa-yenisehir.bel.tr

Yenişehir (Turkish pronunciation: ['jeniʃehiɾ]) is a municipality and district of Bursa Province, Turkey. Its area is 720 km^{2}, and its population is 54,844 (2022). It is 52 km far from the east of Bursa and Bursa city center. Bursa's international airport is within the borders of Yenişehir. For this reason, the airport is called 'Yenişehir Airport'.

The district economics is agriculture- and livestock-based. Although founded by the municipality in 2004, the Yenişehir Organized Industrial Zone began the industrialization boom. It is the number one district of Bursa, especially in the export of agricultural products. Tomato and capsicum cultivation is world famous.

The region has a mild Marmara climate.

It is located close to İnegöl and İznik. Some of the people of Yenişehir go to Bursa and İnegöl to work. Yenişehir is neighbor to Kestel in the west, İnegöl in the south, İznik in the north, Orhangazi in the north-west and Bilecik in the east. The total population of the district is around 52,200.

== History ==
Yenişehir, which was established by building permanent houses for the first time from the tent life in the Beylik period of the Ottoman Empire, was used by the Ottoman Army in Anatolia and Middle East expeditions due to its wetland and wide plain. The claim that the city was founded by Osman Gazi is among the opinions put forward. Where for the first time, a sermon was read, coins were printed, taxes were collected, a regular army was started to be established, and the first law (edict) was commanded here. According to one view, it is claimed that Yenişehir was known as Melangeia/Malágina in 1308 or that Yenişehir was formerly known as Neapolis. Before the population exchange, it was the center of a sub-administration with the same name with a population of approximately 5,000; 2,500 of its population were Greeks, who had excellent schools. Greeks emigrated after the forced population exchange in 1923. It was the residence of Sultan Osman I, the founder of the dynasty, in the early years of the Ottoman conquest. Traces of his palace and other buildings (hammams) have been preserved until today. Although it is claimed that Yenişehir was called Neapolis before the Turkish conquest, the name of the city, Neapolis, may have been translated into Turkish. It is also claimed that it was conquered from the Byzantine Empire in the early periods of the Ottoman Empire or that the city spontaneously joined the Ottoman Empire from the Byzantine Empire. Then the city was the capital for a short time (29 years) (although Söğüt is also claimed to be the capital) and the city handed over the duty as capital with the acquisition of Bursa. The district is one of the developing districts of Bursa province.

The known history of Yenişehir dates back to the beginning of the 14th century. It was connected to the Ertuğrul sanjak, where Bilecik was the center at that time, and continued this position until 1926. İznik was the subdistrict of the city between 1926 and 1930.

After the capture of Köprühisar and Yarhisar in the years when the Ottoman Empire became a state, Osman Bey gave this region to his veterans as a sword right. Yenişehir became known with this name for the first time since it was opened for construction. In the book "Ottoman History", written by İsmail Hakkı Uzunçarşılı, the phrase "A Turkish city was established in the plain and a headquarters was built because it was close to the battlefield".

In the light of this information, it is understood that Yenişehir was established as a Turkish city and opened to residence. From 1867 until 1921, Yenişehir was part of Hüdavendigâr vilayet. Yenişehir, a 680-year-old Turkish city, was temporarily retaken by the Greeks during the 1919–1922 Greco-Turkish War between 27 October 1920 and 6 September 1922. On 6 September 1922, Mustafa Kemal's Turkish nationalist forces retook the city. The establishment of the villages goes back to old times, for example, the Yarhisar neighborhood is known to have Tekfur barracks during the Byzantine period. Likewise, Akbıyık and Süleymaniye villages have remained from the Byzantine period (castle). The Ottomans built many historical monuments in the city. 10 of the 17 mosques in the district center belong to the Ottoman period. Some of the mosques and baths built in villages were built during the Ottoman period. Other historical monuments in the district are Babasultan Lodge, Sinanpaşa Mosque and Caravansary, Çiftehamamlar, Süleymanpaşa Mosque and Mausoleum, Palace Bath, Shemaki House.

While describing the history of Yenişehir, it made it easier to tell that Osman Ghazi, the founder of the Ottoman Empire, spent his childhood in the Yarhisar neighborhood, and won great victories against the Byzantines in the Koyunhisar plain. The Ottomans also went to the west in several wars. In these wars, Osman Bey's nephew Aydoğdu Bey was martyred. His grave is still in Koyunhisar neighborhood.

== Composition ==
There are 71 neighbourhoods in Yenişehir District:

- Afşar
- Akbıyık
- Akçapınar
- Akdere
- Alaylı
- Ayaz
- Aydoğdu
- Barcın
- Beypınarı
- Burcun
- Çamönü
- Çardak
- Çayır
- Çayırlı
- Çelebi
- Çeltikçi
- Çiçeközü
- Cihadiye
- Demirboğa
- Dereköy
- Ebeköy
- Eğerce
- Fethiye
- Gökçesu
- Gündoğan
- Günece
- Hayriye
- Hıdırbali
- İncirli
- Karaamca
- Karabahadır
- Karacaahmet
- Karacaali
- Karaköy
- Karasıl
- Kavaklı
- Kıblepınar
- Kirazlıyayla
- Kızılhisar
- Kızılköy
- Köprühisar
- Koyunhisar
- Kozdere
- Kurtuluş
- Mahmudiye
- Marmaracık
- Mecidiye
- Menteşe
- Orhaniye
- Osmaniye
- Papatya
- Paşayayla
- Reşadiye
- Selimiye
- Söylemiş
- Subaşı
- Süleymaniye
- Tabakhane
- Terziler
- Toprakdere
- Toprakocak
- Ulucami
- Yarhisar
- Yazılı
- Yenigün
- Yeniköy
- Yenimahalle
- Yıldırım
- Yılmaz
- Yolören
- Yüzüncüyıl

== Culture and tourism ==
The district, which is located 52 km east of Bursa and joined the Ottoman territory in the period of Osman Gazi, was granted to the veterans by Osman Gazi under the name of sword right. The city, which was established at the location opened to living, was named Yenişehir.

It has rich historical artifacts from the Ottoman period. The Palace Bath, which was left behind from the palace built by Osman Gazi in Yenişehir, is the Postinpuş Baba Lodge from the period of Murad I. Voyvoda Mosque (Çınarlı Mosque), built in the 14th century, Koca Sinan Pasha Complex, Bali Bey Mosque, built in the 16th century. Ulu Mosque, Süleyman Pasha Complex, built by Orhan Bey, Double Bath, built by Hüseyin Pasha of Yenişehir in 1645, Yarhisar Village Orhan Mosque and Clock Tower are historical buildings worth seeing. In addition, there are historical tumuluses in Barcın Neighborhood of Yenişehir.

== Yenişehir Shemaki House Museum ==
It was built in the 18th century by the Shemaki family who came to Anatolia from Shemakh town of Iran and settled in Yenişehir. On the ground floor of the two-story house there is a stony kitchen and a cellar to the right and two winter rooms to the left.

You can go upstairs with wooden stairs adjacent to the kitchen wall. Facing the garden, the front facade opens to the outside with arched sections in the form of porticoes. There is a big room opening to the sofa with iwan on the left and two rooms, one on the right and one on the small. Pen works with ornamental motifs and landscape decorations adorning the house from the 19th century.

There is no bathhouse part that is said to be located in the garden today.

Yenişehir Shemaki House Museum is open to visitors every day except Monday.

== Transportation ==
=== Road transport ===
Yenişehir is 25 km from İznik district in the north, 27 km from İnegöl district in the south, 45 km from Bilecik province in the east and 52 km from Bursa province in the west. There are scheduled bus services to Yenişehir from all four cities.

=== Airline transportation ===
At Bursa Yenişehir Airport, scheduled civil flight services and cargo transportation can be made.

== Media ==
Visual media service was provided for a period under the name of Yenişehir TV (Yörem TV). There was also a radio publishing house broadcasting on the FM band called Radio Sırdaş locally. Today, there is no active radio and television channel in the district. Representations of national and regional news agencies and media organizations are located in the district.

Local newspapers

- Detay Newspaper (Weekly)
- Gündem Newspaper (6 days a week)
- Harman Newspaper (2 days a week)
- Yörem Newspaper (7 days a week)
- Alternatif Newspaper (7 days a week)

== Civil society organizations ==
Some non-governmental organizations operating in the district are:

- YECSN – Yenişehir Civil Society Network
- YEENV – Yenişehir Environmental Movement
- YENALI – Yenişehir Natural Life and Animal Protection Association
- ATA – Atatürkçü Thought Association Yenişehir Branch
- YOUTH-UNI – Contemporary Thought Club and Youth Union
