= Aydoğdu, Yenişehir =

Village in Turkey

Aydoğdu
- Neighbourhood
- Location in Turkey Aydoğdu (Marmara)
- Coordinates: 40.3405°N 29.7439°E
- Country: Turkey
- Province: Bursa
- District: Yenişehir
- Population (2022): 174
- Time zone: UTC+3 (TRT)

Aydoğdu is a neighbourhood in the municipality and district of Yenişehir, Bursa Province in Turkey. Its population is 174 (2022).
