= Dadalı, Akçakoca =

Village in Turkey

Dadalı
- Village
- Location in Turkey
- Coordinates: 41.0611°N 31.1845°E
- Country: Turkey
- Province: Düzce
- District: Akçakoca
- Population (2022): 556
- Time zone: UTC+3 (TRT)

Dadalı is a village in the Akçakoca District of Düzce Province in Turkey. Its population is 556 (2022).
