= Paşalar, Shusha =

Village in Azerbaijan

Coordinates: 39°46′N 46°36′E

Paşalar is a village in the Shusha District of Azerbaijan.
