= Paşalar, Akçakoca =

Village in Turkey

Paşalar
- Village
- Country: Turkey
- Province: Düzce
- District: Akçakoca
- Population (2022): 195
- Time zone: UTC+3 (TRT)

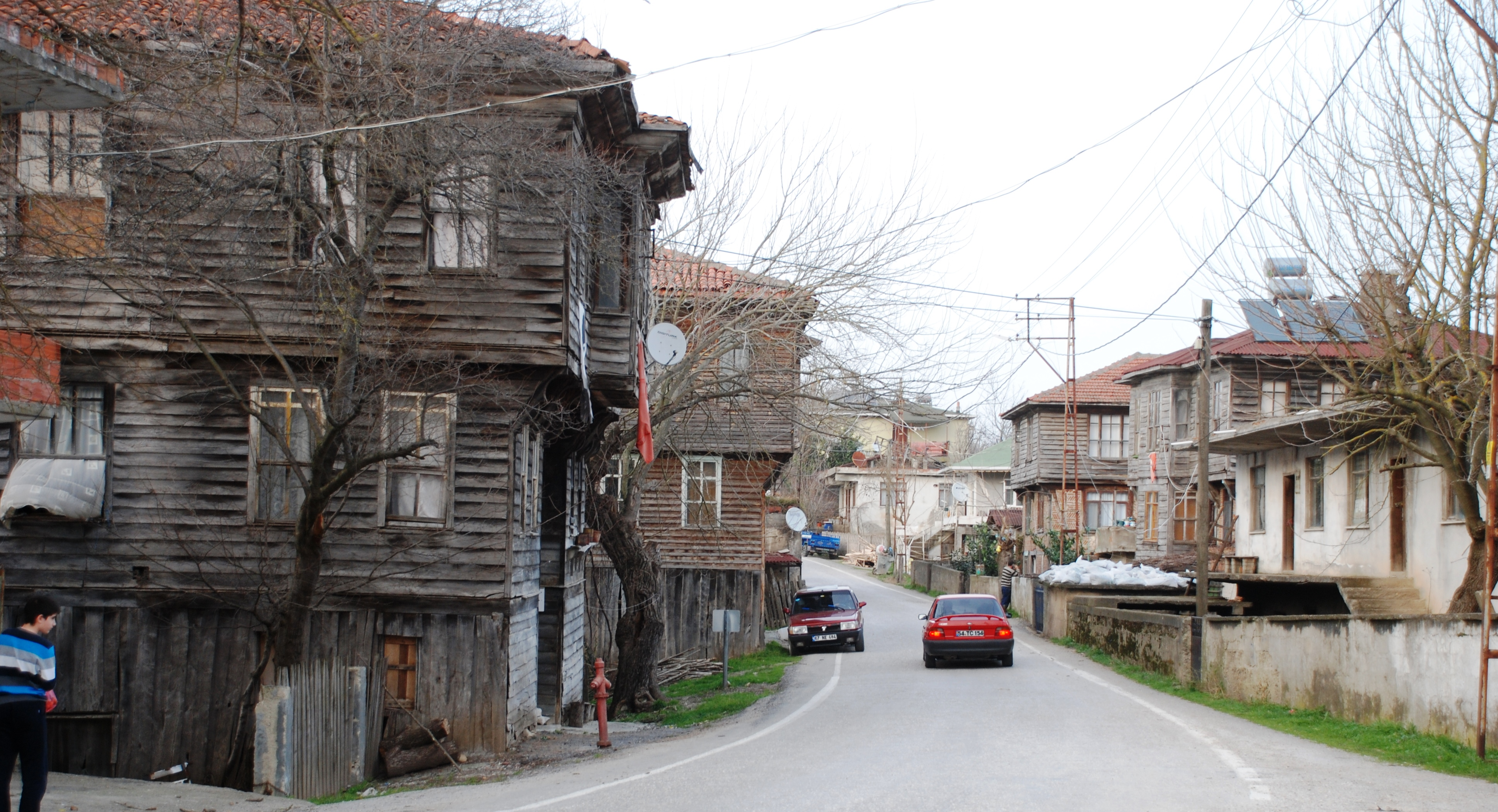
The Akçakoca-Kocaali road passes through Paşalar village.

Paşalar is a village in the Akçakoca District of Düzce Province in Turkey. Its population is 195 (2022).
