= Akkaya, Akçakoca =

Village in Turkey

Akkaya
- Village
- Location in Turkey
- Coordinates: 41.0964°N 31.2591°E
- Country: Turkey
- Province: Düzce
- District: Akçakoca
- Population (2022): 490
- Time zone: UTC+3 (TRT)

Akkaya is a village in the Akçakoca District of Düzce Province in Turkey. Its population is 490 (2022).
