= Dilaver, Akçakoca =

Village in Turkey

Dilaver
- Village
- Location in Turkey
- Coordinates: 40°58′N 30°59′E
- Country: Turkey
- Province: Düzce
- District: Akçakoca
- Population (2022): 108
- Time zone: UTC+3 (TRT)

Dilaver is a village in the Akçakoca District of Düzce Province in Turkey. Its population is 108 (2022).
