= Subaşı, Yenişehir =

Village in Turkey

Subaşı
- Neighbourhood
- Country: Turkey
- Province: Bursa
- District: Yenişehir
- Population (2022): 528
- Time zone: UTC+3 (TRT)

Subaşı is a neighbourhood in the municipality and district of Yenişehir, Bursa Province in Turkey. Its population is 528 (2022).

The name of the village is driven from various sayings. According to one of these sayings the village was situated near a river; however, to escape from the potential threat of flood and to settle in a more agriculturally productive landscape the villagers settled by an underwater source called "Kayaaltı" and took the place as their new home.
