= Subaşı (surname) =

Subaşı (IPA: [subaˈʃɯ], literally "head (baş) of the army/military (sü)" or "chief (baş) soldier (sü)") is a Turkish surname derived from the synonymous Ottoman title and may refer to:

- Burutay Subaşı (born 1990), Turkish volleyball player
- Edibe Subaşı (1920–2011), Turkish aviator
- Hande Subaşı (born 1984), Turkish actress
- Yakup Şevki Subaşı (1876–1939), general of the Ottoman Army
- Yasir Subaşı (born 1996), Turkish footballer
