= Qozdərə =

Gozdere
- Azerbaijani: Qozdərə
- Location within Azerbaijan
- Coordinates: 40°50′N 45°41′E
- Country: Azerbaijan
- District: Tovuz
- Municipality: Məşədilər
- Time zone: UTC+4 (AZT)
  - Summer (DST): UTC+5 (AZT)

Qozdərə (also, Gozdere) is a village in the Tovuz District of Azerbaijan. The village forms part of the municipality of Məşədilər.
