= Beyören, Akçakoca =

Village in Turkey

Beyören
- Village
- Location in Turkey
- Coordinates: 41.0431°N 31.1587°E
- Country: Turkey
- Province: Düzce
- District: Akçakoca
- Population (2022): 496
- Time zone: UTC+3 (TRT)

Beyören is a village in the Akçakoca District of Düzce Province in Turkey. Its population is 496 (2022).
