= Manavs =

Turkic people

Manavlar
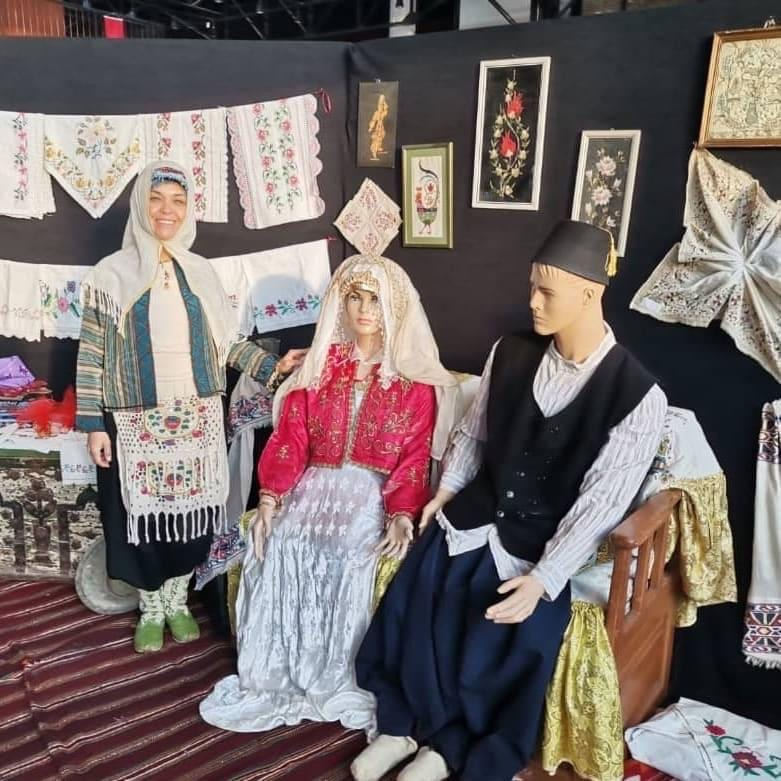
- Traditional Manav clothes from Kandıra, Kocaeli

Total population
- Turkey; East Marmara Region, Marmara region, Aegean Region

Languages
- Turkish; Old Anatolian Turkish (historical)

Religion
- Sunni Islam (Hanafism)

Related ethnic groups
- Turkic peoples

Manavs (Turkish: Manavlar) or Manav Turks (Manav Türkleri) are a subgroup of Turkish people living in northwest Anatolia, especially in Sakarya, Bilecik, Balıkesir, Bursa, Çanakkale, Kocaeli, Eskişehir, Bolu and Düzce provinces. It is proposed that Manavs descend from Cumans and Kipchaks who settled in the Byzantine Empire.

== Origin ==
It's commonly believed that a group of Cuman-Kipchaks who headed to the Balkans as a result of the Mongol incursions into the Desht-i Qipchaq lands; it is known that they entered the service of the Latin and Nicaea Empires. The Empire of Nicea used this Cuman group as Turcopoles against the Seljuk and Mongol threats from the East and settled it in their lands. This Cuman-Kipchak group interbred with the local Byzantines who had been mixed with Slavs and later with Oghuz Turks, forming the people called Manav.

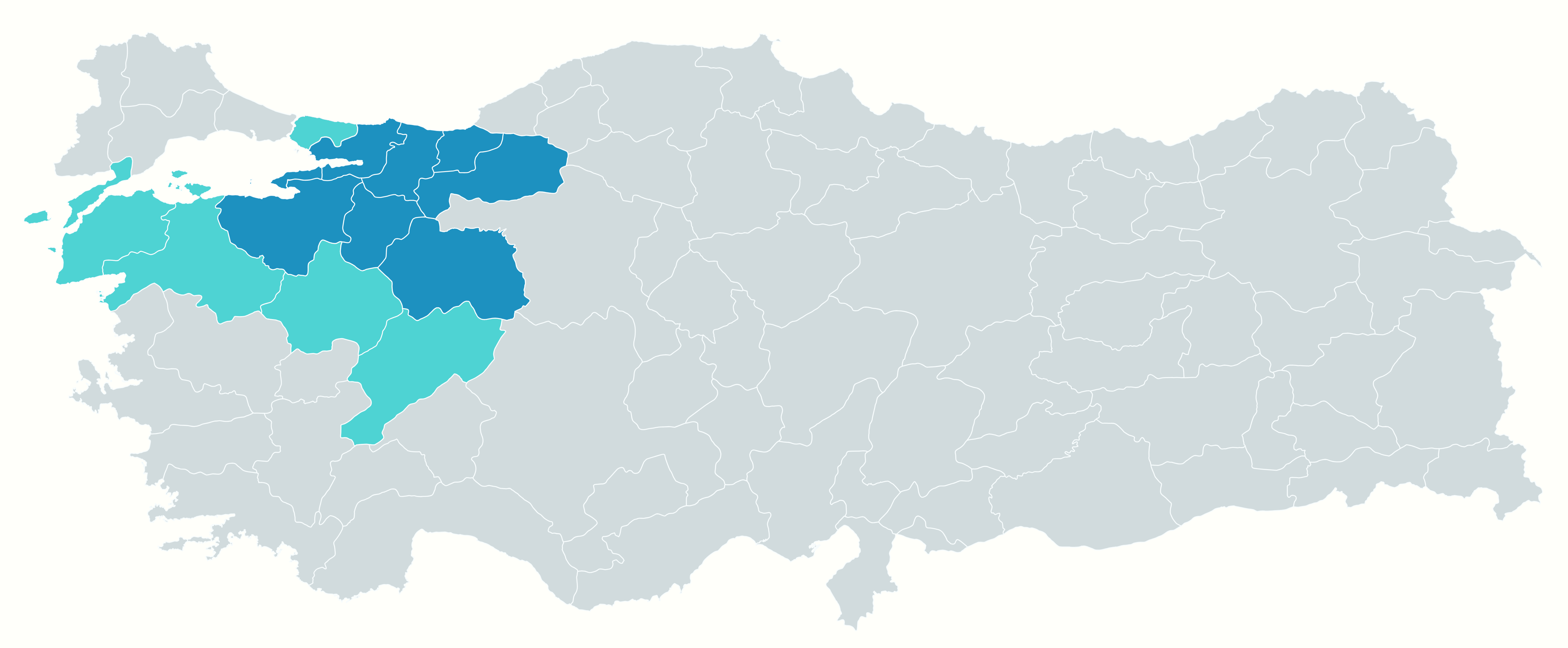
Distribution of Manavs in Turkey

== Language ==
Manavs speak Turkish with a dialects bear traces of Kipchak and Oghuric to varying degrees, in relation to their origins.
